= Pyotr Chavus =

Soviet-Belarusian former lieutenant general and politician

- Пётр Чавус; Пётр Чаус

Minister of Defence of Belarus
- In office December 1991 – April 1992
- Prime Minister: Vyacheslav Kebich
- Leader: Stanislav Shushkevich
- Preceded by: Position established
- Succeeded by: Pavel Pavlovich Kozlovsky

Personal details
- Born: 7 January 1939 (age 87) Staryna, Byelorussian SSR, Soviet Union (now Belarus)
- Education: Minsk Suvorov Military School; Tashkent Higher All-Arms Command School

Military service
- Allegiance: Soviet Union (until 1991); Belarus (1991–1995)
- Branch/service: Soviet Army (until 1992); Belarusian Ground Forces (1992–1995)
- Rank: Lieutenant general
- Commands: Baltic Military District
- Battles/wars: Operation Danube; Soviet–Afghan War

Pyotr Ryhoravič Chavus (Note: Belarusian: Пётр Рыгоравіч Чавус Russian: Пётр Григорьевич Чаус, romanized: Pyotr Grigoryevich Chaus) (born 7 January 1939) is a Soviet-Belarusian retired lieutenant general and politician the first Defence Minister of Belarus, serving from December 1991 to April 1992. He was succeeded by Pavel Pavlovich Kozlovsky.

He graduated from Minsk Suvorov Military School and later Tashkent Higher Military Command School. He began his service as commander of a tank platoon in the North Caucasus Military District. He then served as the deputy commander of a tank battalion in the Belorussian Military District. In 1968, he participated in Warsaw Pact invasion of Czechoslovakia. He graduated from the Military Political Academy named after Lenin. In 1978, he attended the Military Academy of the General Staff of the Armed Forces. He served in the Central Asian Military District in 1980. In 1987, he became an adviser to the Chief of the General Staff of the Democratic Republic of Afghanistan. From 1988 to 1991 he was the chief of staff of the Baltic Military District. In 1991, he served as head of the Institute of Military History of the USSR, the chief of staff, and first deputy head of the Civil Defence of the USSR.

At the end of 1991, during a business trip in Minsk he accepted the offer to lead the newly created Ministry of Defence of Belarus. From May 1992, he served as the Deputy Minister of Defence. From 1994 to 1995, he was an adviser to the Belarusian government.
