= Alexander Volfovich =

Belarusian general

Lieutenant General Alexander Volfovich
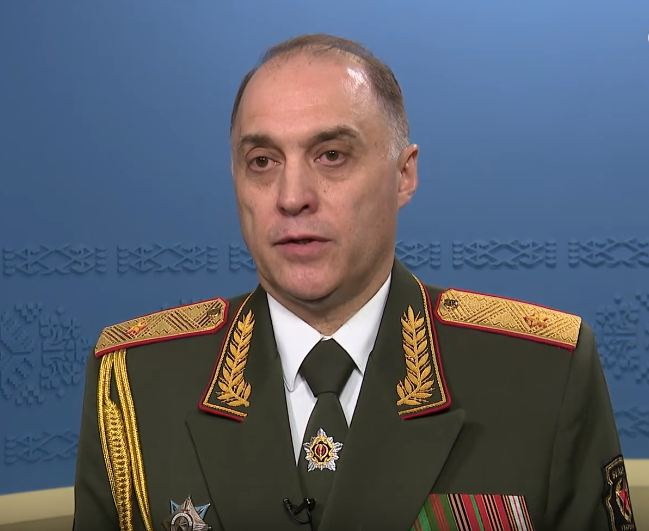

State Secretary of Security Council of Belarus
- Incumbent
- Assumed office 26 January 2021
- President: Alexander Lukashenko
- Preceded by: Valery Vakulchik

Chief of the General Staff
- In office 20 January 2020 – 26 January 2021
- President: Alexander Lukashenko
- Preceded by: Oleg Belokonev
- Succeeded by: Viktor Gulevich

Personal details
- Born: 28 June 1967 (age 58) Kazan, Russian SFSR, Soviet Union

Military service
- Allegiance: Soviet Union (1984–1991); Belarus (1992–present)
- Branch/service: Soviet Army; Belarusian Ground Forces
- Years of service: 1984–present
- Rank: Lieutenant General

Alexander Grigoryevich Volfovich (transcribed from Belarusian: Aliaksandr Ryhoravich Valfovich) (Belarusian: Аляксандр Рыгоравіч Вальфовіч) is a Belarusian general who is the current Secretary of the State Security Council of the Republic of Belarus. He is also a former Chief of the General Staff of the Armed Forces of Belarus.

== Early life ==
Alexander Grigorievich Volfovich was born on June 28, 1967, in Kazan into the family of Tatyana Yakovlevna and Grigory Aleksandrovich Volfovich, a retired Soviet Army lieutenant colonel, who hailed from Balta (Odesa Oblast of Ukraine) but lived for a long time in Slutsk. The family lived at Soviet bases in Lankaran (Azerbaijan) and in East Germany, before settling in the Byelorussian Soviet Socialist Republic in the early 1980s. In 1984, he graduated from secondary school No.7 in the city of Borisov.

== Early career ==
In 1988, he graduated from the Moscow Higher Military Command School. It was here where he studied with the former Minister of Defense Andrei Ravkov. Over the next 5 years, he served in battalion and regimental level positions in the Soviet Army and the newly formed Armed Forces of Belarus. In 1993, he became the chief of staff of a motorised rifle battalion at the 72nd Guards Joint Training Centre. After graduating from the Command and Staff Department of the Military Academy of Belarus in 1998, he resumed his work in the training centre.

In 2002, Alexander Volfovich took up the post of chief of staff at the 361th Security and Maintenance Base. Between 2005 and 2008, he served in the Main Operational Directorate of the General Staff. He studied in Russia for a year in 2008 at their General Staff Military Academy. Upon his return, he became the commander of the 120th Guards Mechanised Brigade of the North Western Operational Command, and later the commander of this command.

== High positions within the army ==
While in his position, he was promoted to his current rank in June 2012. In 2018, by decree of President Alexander Lukashenko, he was appointed to the post of the First Deputy Chief of the General Staff of the Belarusian Armed Forces. He served in this position for just two years before being appointed by presidential decree in January 2020 as Chief of the General Staff, First Deputy Minister of Defence of Belarus. He became the Secretary of the Security Council on 26 January 2021. He was promoted to the rank of Lieutenant general a month later.

=== Sanctions ===
He was put under sanctions by Lithuania over his role in suppressing the 2020 Belarusian protests. In 2022, Volfovich was included in the Specially Designated Nationals and Blocked Persons List of the US and in the sanctions lists of the European Union, the United Kingdom, New Zealand, Japan, Switzerland, Canada, Australia and Ukraine.

== Personal life ==
His son Maxim (born 1990) is an officer in the Belarusian Armed Forces. Until recently, Maxim commanded a mechanized battalion at the 6th Guards Kiev-Berlin Mechanised Brigade, which is stationed in Grodno. His brother Dmitry Volfovich is a military commissar in Vitebsk, being a veteran of the First Chechen War as part of the Russian Federal Counterintelligence Service. During the war he was captured by forces of the Chechen Republic of Ichkeria, being released in December 1994.
