= Sterkh-BM =

Type of aircraft

The Sterkh-BM is an unmanned aerial vehicle that was designed and produced by Minsk Aircraft Overhaul Plant in Belarus. There were plans to start batch production of the unmanned aerial vehicle Sterkh-BM in 2013. Several Sterkh-BMs are said to have been assembled so far. The plant intends to make up to ten every year.

The Belarusian UAV is expected to be sold on the home market primarily to the Defense Ministry of Belarus, the Interior Ministry, and the Emergencies Ministry. Minsk Aircraft Overhaul Plant has already sent the relevant proposals to the ministries. There are also plans to promote the UAV onto the CIS and CSTO markets. Minsk Aircraft Overhaul Plant CEO Evgeni Vajtsekhovich, has said that Cuba is interested not only in acquiring the Sterkh-BM but also in establishing a joint assembly manufacturing of the aircraft in Cuba.

== Design ==
The Sterkh-BM weighs 65 kg (143 lbs) and boasts a cruise speed of 120 kmph (74.5 mph). The top speed is 200 kmph (124 mph), the max range is 240 kilometers (149 miles) The wing span of the UAV is 3.8 meters (12 feet 5 inches), and the Service ceiling is 3000 meters (9842 feet). The aircraft is powered by a gasoline piston engine. It acquires data via GPS. If necessary, it can use GLONASS. If GPS encounters problems, a ground-based module can mimic the signal.

The Sterkh-BM can take off, follow a route and land without operator’s assistance. The aircraft can take off from virtually any surface. It has cost about US$500,000 to design the unmanned aerial vehicle.
