= Alyaksandr Naumenka =

Belarusian army officer (born 1970)

- Аляксандр Віктаравіч Навуменка
- Born: Alyaksandr Viktaravich Naumenka; 26 November 1970 (age 55); Belarusian SSR, Soviet Union
- Military career
- Allegiance: Belarus
- Branch: Belarusian Ground Forces
- Rank: Major General
- Commands: Northwestern Operational Command (since 21 March 2021)

Major General Alyaksandr Viktaravich Naumenka (Belarusian: Аляксандр Віктаравіч Навуменка; Russian: Александр Викторович Науменко; born 26 November 1970) is a Belarusian army officer. He has been serving as the Deputy Minister of Defense since 17 June 2024.

He previously served as commander of the Northwestern Operational Command from 2021 to 2024. Naumenka faces sanctions from several governments for his presumed participation in the Russian invasion of Ukraine.

== Biography ==
Alyaksandr Naumenka was born in Belarus on 26 November 1970. He graduated from the Minsk Suvorov Military School in 1988 and from the Kharkov Higher Military Command Tank School in 1992.

Naumenka served in the 30th Guards Irkutsk-Pinsk Division; after its reduction, he transferred to the 5th Separate Special Purpose Brigade in 2010. During his tenure with the brigade, he held several positions, including group commander, company commander, deputy detachment commander, detachment commander, and brigade chief of staff.

He also served in the Main Intelligence and Main Operations Directorates of the General Staff of the Armed Forces. Later, Naumenka graduated from the Military Academy of Belarus.

Prior to his appointment as head of the Minsk SVU in 2016, he served as chief of staff and first deputy commander of the special operations forces of the Armed Forces of the Republic of Belarus.

On 11 March 2021, Naumenka was appointed commander of the Northwestern Operational Command. In 2022, he was sanctioned by the United Kingdom, European Union, Switzerland, Australia, and New Zealand for his presumed participation in Belarus's support for the Russian invasion of Ukraine.

On 17 June 2024, Naumenka became the Deputy Minister of Defense of Belarus.
