= Alyaksandr Bas =

Belarusian army officer

- Аляксандр Iванавiч Бас
- Born: Alyaksandr Ivanavich Bas; 17 January 1971 (age 55); Hotomel, Belarusian SSR, Soviet Union
- Military career
- Allegiance: Belarus
- Branch: Belarusian Ground Forces
- Rank: Major General
- Commands: Northwestern Operational Command (since 17 July 2024)

Alyaksandr Ivanavich Bas (Belarusian: Аляксандр Iванавiч Бас; Russian: Александр Иванович Бас; born on 17 August 1971) is a Belarusian army officer who is currently serving as the commander of the Northwestern Operational Command since 17 July 2024.

== Biography ==
Alyaksandr Bas was born in Hotomel, Brest Region on 17 August 1971.

In 1992, he graduated from the Chelyabinsk Higher Tank Command School named after the 50th anniversary of the great October.

After graduating from the Faculty of Military Academy of the Republic of Belarus in 2002, he served as an assistant chief of the operational department and chief of intelligence, chief of intelligence department of the headquarters of 38 separate guards mobile brigade of special operations forces.

He was then promoted as the chief of intelligence, chief of intelligence department of the Main Staff of the Ground Forces, and was the Deputy Head of the Center-Head of the Operational and Mobilization Department of the 72 Guards United Training Center for the training of warrant officers and junior specialists.

He was the chief of staff-First Deputy Commander of the 11th Separate Guards Mechanized Brigade, commander of 6 separate guards mechanized brigade.

Upon completion of training at the faculty of the General Staff of the Education Institution "Military Academy of Belarus", he was the deputy chief - head of the inspection department of the Main Military Inspectorate of the Armed Forces of Belarus.

On 7 June 2020, Bas was appointed as deputy commander the Western Operational Command.

On 22 February 2022, Bas was promoted to Major General.

On 12 January 2023, Bas was appointed head of the Main Directorate of Combat Training of the Armed Forces of Belarus.

On 17 July 2024, by decree of the President of Belarus, Major General Bas was appointed commander of the North-Western Operational Command.
