= Military Academy of Belarus =

Military academy in Minsk, Belarus

Military Academy of the Republic of Belarus
- Ваенная акадэмія Рэспублікі Беларусь
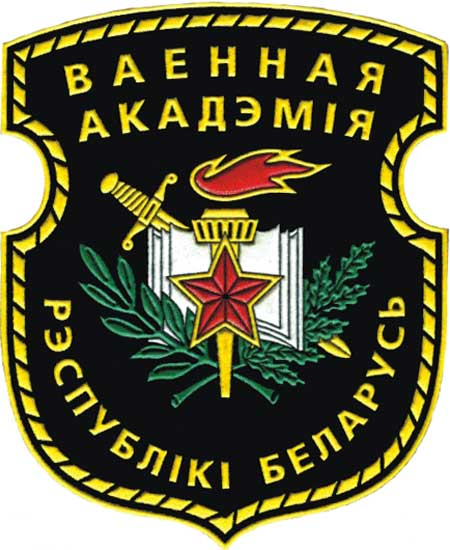
- Academy coat of arms
- Type: military academy
- Established: May 17, 1995
- Affiliations: Armed Forces of Belarus
- Academic affiliations: Belarusian University System
- Officer in charge: Major General Andrei Gorbatenko
- Academic staff: 700
- Students: 2,500
- Doctoral students: 250
- Location: Minsk, Belarus; 53.957714°N 27.736080°E
- Website: varb.mil.by

Military Academy of the Republic of Belarus (Belarusian: Ваенная акадэмія Рэспублікі Беларусь, romanized: Vajennaja akademija Respubliki Bielaruś, Russian: Военная академия Республики Беларусь, ВАРБ) is higher military educational institution in the national education system of the Republic of Belarus and the leading institution in the education system of training, retraining and advanced training of military personnel. It is located on Independence Avenue in the Belarusian capital of Minsk. It has 10 departments that train officers of 38 specialties for all arms of service.

== Brief history and description ==
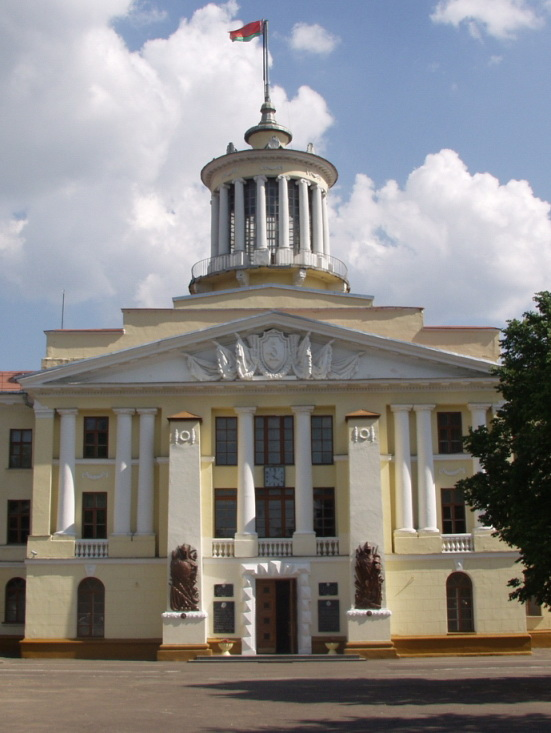
Academy headquarters

Military Academy of the Republic of Belarus was established in accordance with the Presidential Decree No.192 on 17 May 1995 on the basis of two schools: the Minsk Higher Military Engineering School and the Minsk Higher Military Command School. The latter is the successor of the Minsk Higher Military-Political School, which was established on 10 May 1980, carrying out the training of more than 1,900 officers during its existence. From 1980 to 1991, the school gave military training to 900 people from 21 foreign countries. In May 1953, Gomel Higher Military Technical School was established, being the precursor to the Minsk engineering school. After Belarus gained its independence following the Dissolution of the Soviet Union in 1991, the political school was transformed into the command school which later be merged. On 8 September 1992, they were the first to take the military oath of allegiance, with their ceremony being held on Independence Square in the presence of defense minister Pavel Kozlovskii. In 1995, it was also given the status of a government institution of secondary military education.

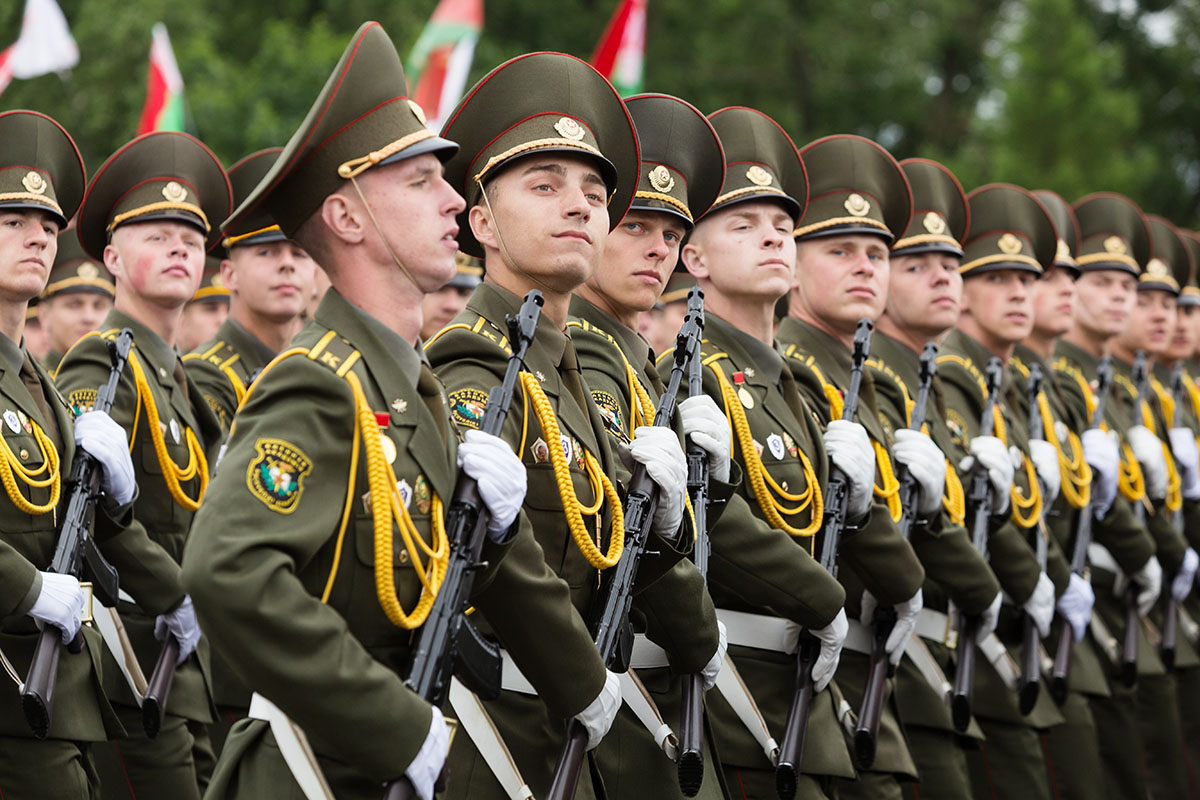
A contingent of the academy during the 2017 Minsk Independence Day Parade.

The academy has lecture halls, classrooms, specialized classrooms, laboratories equipped with computers and automation. The teaching staff includes about 700 teachers, including 20 doctors and 250 candidates of science, 25 professors and 200 associate professors. A lot of its cadets come from the Minsk Suvorov Military School, which is a boarding school that trains students from the age of twelve for future civil/military service. Since the Military Academy was established in 1995, it has trained over 1,500 people, mostly coming from Venezuela, Kazakhstan, Vietnam, and China.

== Areas of study and faculties ==
The following are areas of study at the academy:

- Sensors and Signal Processing
- Information and Communications (Signals)
- Medicine
- Air Pollution and Environmental Control
- Monitoring and Instrumentation
- Fluid Mechanics and Gas Dynamics
- Optics
- Physics
- Avionics
- Leadership skills

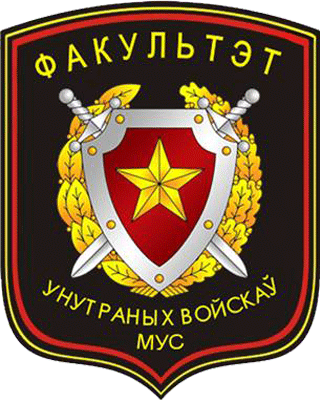
The patch of the academy's Internal Troops faculty.

The academy also operates the following faculties (departments):

- Aviation College
- General Faculty
- College of Internal Troops
- Faculty of Military Intelligence
- College of Air Defense
- Faculty of Missile Forces, Artillery and Missile-Artillery Armament
- Faculty of Communications and Automated Control Systems

== Support Units ==
=== Educational Support Battalion ===
The Educational Support Battalion of the Educational Support Center of the Military Academy (Батальён забеспячэння вучэбнага працэсу Ваеннай акадэміі, BZVP) is a unit of the academy located at the Belaya Luzha training ground near Borisov. The BZVP's task is to provide practical training for cadets of the Military Academy.

== Chiefs ==
- Major General Viktor Lisovsky (-15 July 2021)
- Major General Gennady Lepeshko (15 July 2021 – 29 March 2024)
- Major General Andrei Gorbatenko (since 29 April 2024)

== Notable alumni ==
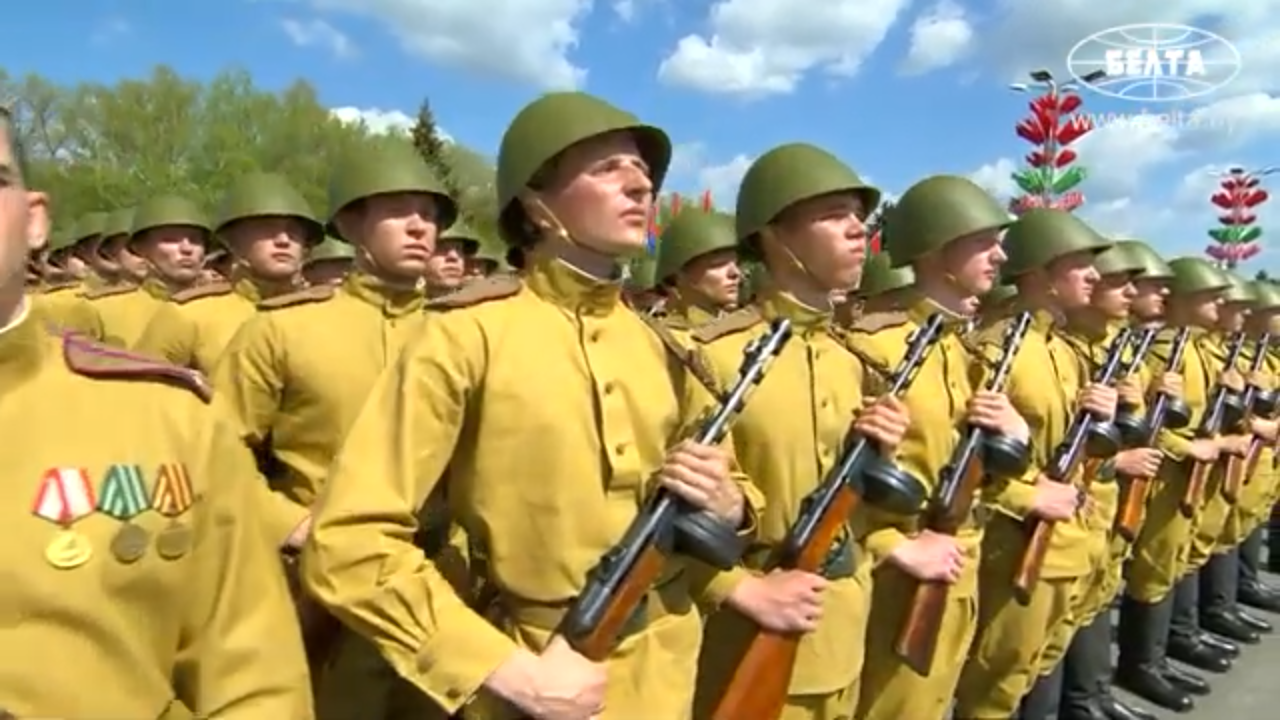
Cadets dressed in historical uniforms during the 2020 Minsk Victory Day Parade.

- Andrei Ravkov – Class of 1999, Minister of Defence of Belarus
- Oleg Belokonev – Class of 1999, Chief of the General Staff of the Armed Forces of Belarus
- Murat Maikeyev – Class of 2014, Chief of the General Staff of the Armed Forces of the Republic of Kazakhstan (2016–2019)
- Alexander Fetisov – Class of 1988, Head of the City Orkrug of Samara
- Begench Gundogdyev – Class of 2012, Minister of Defense of Turkmenistan (since 2018)
