= Yuri Zhadobin =

Lieutenant General Yuri Zhadobin
- Юрый Віктаравіч Жадобін
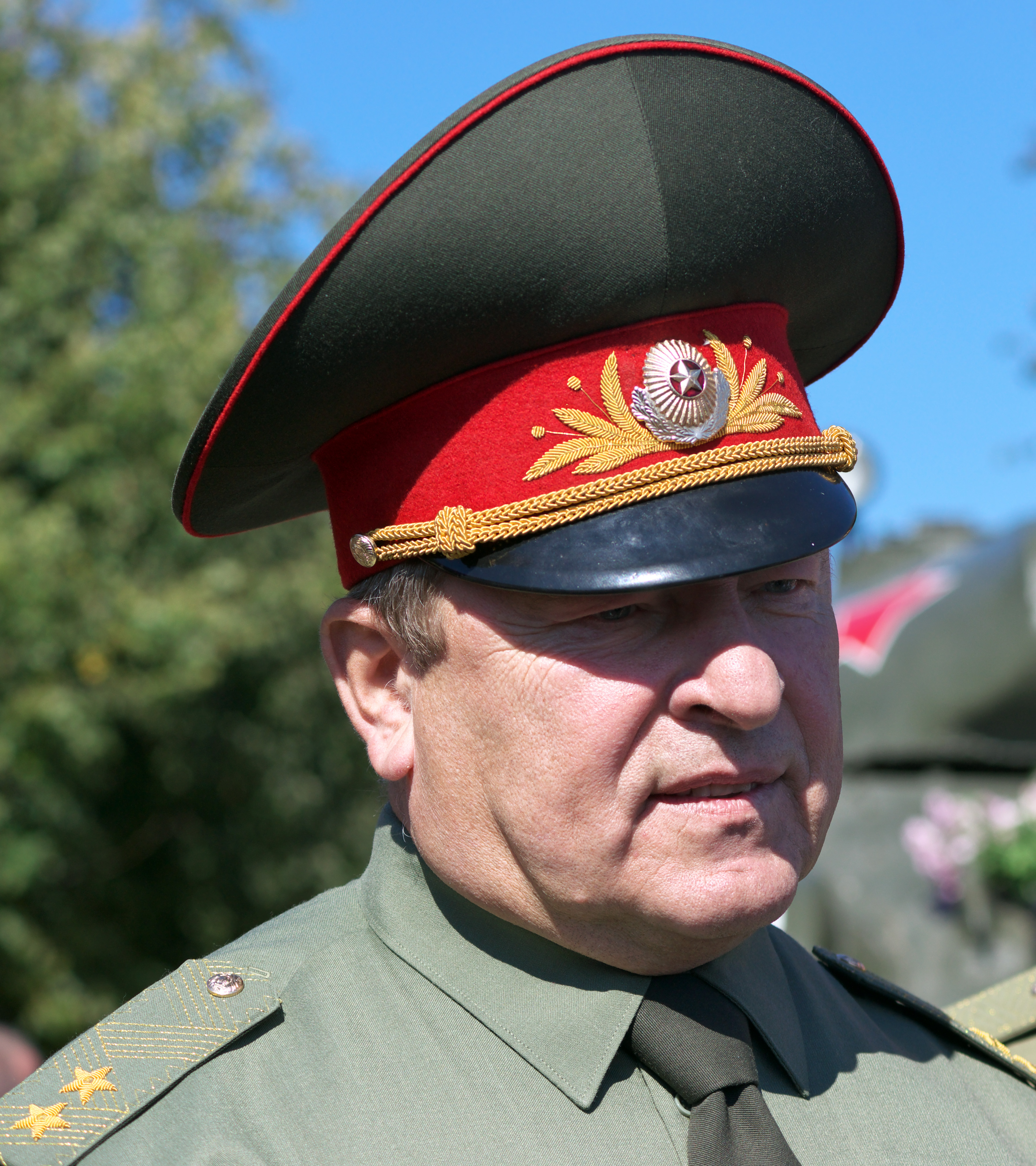
- Zhadobin in Vitebsk

Minister of Defence of Belarus
- In office 4 December 2009 – 27 November 2014
- President: Alexander Lukashenko
- Preceded by: Leonid Maltsev
- Succeeded by: Andrei Ravkov

State Secretary of Security Council of Belarus
- In office July 15, 2008 – December 4, 2009
- President: Alexander Lukashenko
- Preceded by: Gennady Nevyglas
- Succeeded by: Leonid Maltsev

Personal details
- Born: 14 November 1954 (age 71) Dnipropetrovsk, Ukrainian SSR, Soviet Union (now Dnipro, Ukraine)

Military service
- Allegiance: Soviet Union; Belarus
- Branch/service: Soviet Army; Belarusian Internal Troops
- Years of service: 1976–2014
- Rank: Lieutenant general

Lieutenant-General Yuri Viktorovich Zhadobin (Belarusian: Юрый Віктаравіч Жадобін) was the Chairman of the KGB of the Republic of Belarus from 2007 to 2008 and the Minister of Defence of Belarus from 4 December 2009 to 27 November 2014. He replaced Leonid Maltsev and was succeeded by Andrei Ravkov. Zhadobin was subject to international sanctions as a person responsible for political repressions and human rights violations in Belarus.

== Biography ==
Yuri Viktorovich Zhadobin was born on 14 November 1954 in Dnipropetrovsk, Ukrainian SSR.

In 1976, he was admitted to the Kazan Higher Tank Command School. In 1985, he joined the command department of the Malinovsky Military Armored Forces Academy. In 1999, he was appointed Deputy Minister of Internal Affairs. In September 2003, he became the head of the Presidential Security Service. He was appointed chairman of the KGB on 17 July 2007. He served as the State Secretary of the Security Council from 2008 to 2009 when he became Minister of Defence.

=== Accusations, international sanctions ===
As part of the international sanctions against the regime in Belarus following a crackdown of the opposition following the 2010 Belarusian presidential election, Zhadobin became subject to travel ban and asset freeze by the European Union as part of a list of Belarusian officials responsible for political repressions, vote rigging and propaganda.

In its 2012 decision, the EU Council stated regarding Zhadobin:

"As a member of the Security Council, he approves the repressive decisions agreed at ministerial level, including the decision to repress the peaceful demonstrations on 19 December 2010. After December 2010, he praised the 'total defeat of destructive forces', when referring to the democratic opposition."

== Personal life ==
He is married to Larisa Alexandrovna, a doctor who teaches at the Faculty of Humanities of the Belarusian State University where she is currently a senior lecturer. He has one daughter named Aliaksandra, who is a captain of the internal services and a senior legal advisor to the department of the Ministry of Emergency Situations where he husband works. He also has one son named Viktor, who commanded unit 7434, the security unit for Astravets Nuclear Power Plant.
