= Anatoly Kostenko =

Belarusian lieutenant general

Lieutenant-General Anatoly Kostenko
- Анатоль Іванавіч Касценка

Minister of Defence of Belarus
- In office 28 July 1994 – 6 June 1995
- President: Alexander Lukashenko
- Preceded by: Paul Kozlowski
- Succeeded by: Leonid Maltsev

Personal details
- Born: 27 January 1940 (age 86) Krasnodar Krai, RSFSR, Soviet Union
- Education: Kiev Suvorov Military School

Military service
- Allegiance: USSR; Belarus
- Years of service: 1982-present
- Rank: Lieutenant General

Lieutenant-General Anatoly Ivanovich Kostenko (Belarusian: Анатоль Іванавіч Касценка; born on 27 January 1940) was the Minister of Defence of Belarus from 28 July 1994 to 6 June 1995. He was preceded by Paul Kozlowski and succeeded by Leonid Maltsev.

== Biography ==
He graduated from the Kiev Suvorov Military School in 1959, the Odessa Higher Combined Arms Command School in 1962, the M. V. Frunze Military Academy in 1970 and the Military Academy of the General Staff of the Armed Forces in 1981.

He served in the Group of Soviet Forces in Germany (1962–1967), commander of the 122nd separate motorized rifle battalion (1970–1971), chief of staff of the 296th guards motorized rifle of the Minsk-Gdansk Regiment (1971–1973), commander of the 307th guards training motorized rifle regiment, chief of staff of the 45th guards training tank Rivne division (1973–1979) of the Belarusian military district, commander of the 18th machine gun and artillery division on Iturup, Sakhalin (07.1981-04.1985), commander of the 5th combined arms army (04.1985 -10.1987) Far Eastern Military District, first deputy commander (10.1987-10.1989) and commander (10.1989-04.1992) troops of the Belorussian Military District.

On 28 July 1994 he was appointed Minister of Defense of Belarus. He was in office until 6 June 1995. After his resignation, he worked as a military attache at the Embassy of Belarus in Benelux and as a military representative to NATO.

On his 80th birthday in 2020, Kostenko was congratulated by the Minister of Defense Viktor Khrenin and members of the collegium of the military department.
