= Ministry of Defence (Belarus) =

Government ministry of Belarus

Ministry of Defence of the Republic of Belarus
- Мiнiстэрства абароны Рэспублікі Беларусь (Belarusian); Министерство обороны Республики Беларусь (Russian)
- Emblem of the Ministry of Defence of Belarus

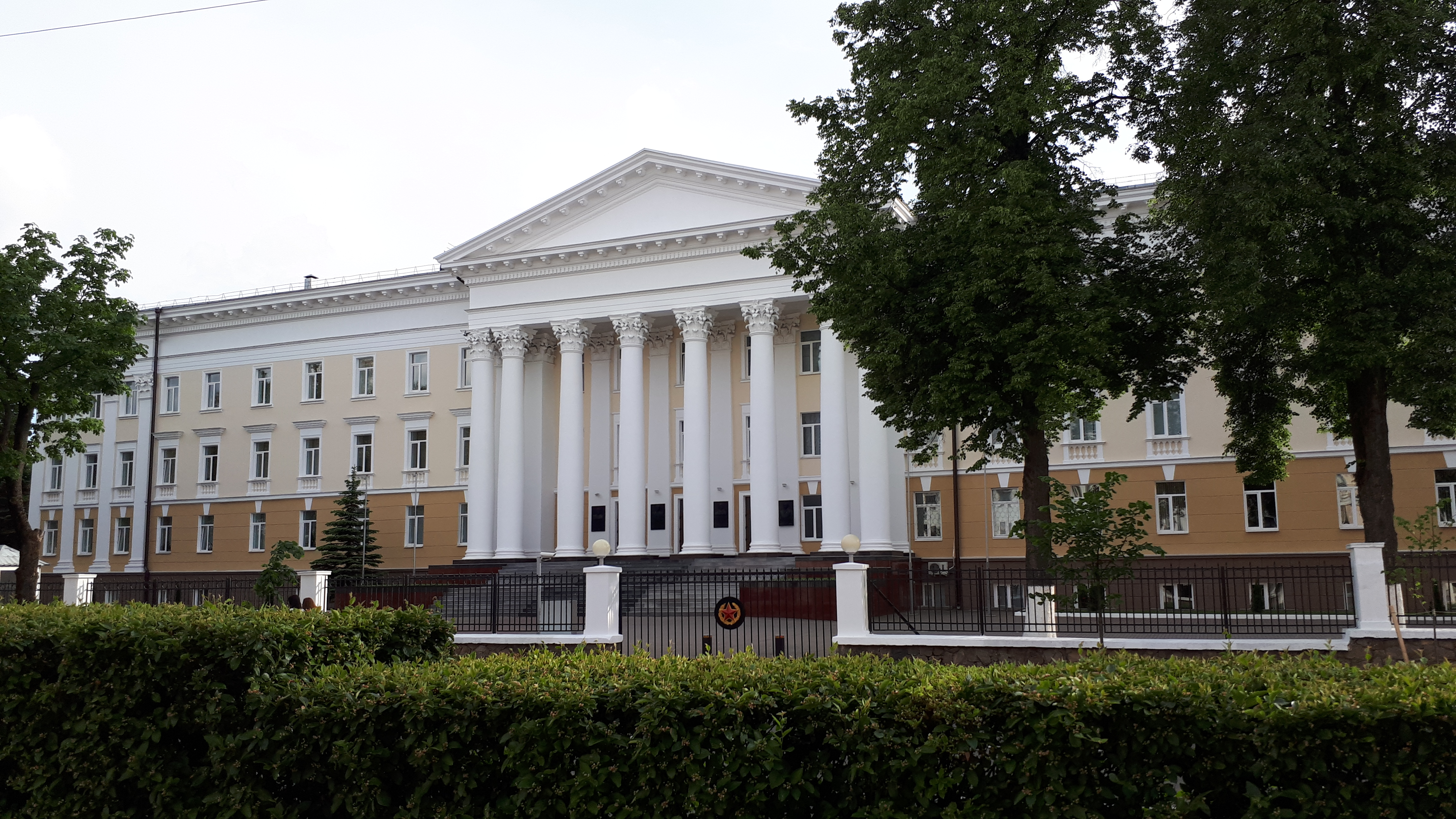
- The ministry building

Agency overview
- Formed: 20 March 1992; 34 years ago
- Preceding agency: Ministry of Defense of the Soviet Union; Headquarters of the Belorussian Military District
- Jurisdiction: Government of Belarus; Council of Ministers of the Republic of Belarus; Security Council of Belarus
- Headquarters: Building 1 Kommunisticheskya Street Minsk, Belarus
- Minister responsible: Lieutenant General Viktor Khrenin, Minister of Defence
- Agency executive: Major General Pavel Muraveiko, Chief of the General Staff
- Website: www.mil.by

The Ministry of Defence of the Republic of Belarus (Belarusian: Мiнiстэрства абароны Рэспублікі Беларусь, romanized: Ministerstva abarony Respubliki Bielaruś; Russian: Министерство обороны Республики Беларусь) is the government organisation that is charged with the duties of raising and maintaining the Armed Forces of Belarus.

The formation of the ministry began in March 1992, after the events of 1991 in which the Soviet Union had effectively dissolved. The ministry was formed on the basis of the former Headquarters of the Soviet Army's Belorussian Military District.

The ministry is part of the Security Council of Belarus, interdepartmental meeting with a mandate to ensure the security of the state. The president, currently Alexander Lukashenko, appoints the minister of defence, who heads the ministry, as well as the heads of the armed services. These four appointees meet with the Secretary of the Security Council every two months. Security Council decisions are approved by a qualified majority of those present. Since 2020, the position of minister of defence has been filled by Lieutenant General Viktor Khrenin.

The budget of the defence ministry in May 2018 was €560 million. Another source said the military budget was pegged at around 1% GDP.

== Structure ==
=== Military Authorities ===
The following departments are under the control of the defence ministry:

- Central Support Elements
  - Office of the Minister of Defence
  - Deputy Ministers
- General Staff of the Armed Forces
  - Main Operations Directorate
  - Main Intelligence Directorate
  - Main Organizational Mobilization Directorate
  - Main Ideology Directorate
  - Main Policy Directorate
  - Department of Information-Analytics
  - Department of Communications
  - Department of Territorial Defence
  - Department of Missile Forces and Artillery
  - Department of Finance
- Logistics
  - Food Management
  - Clothing Management
  - Military Medical Administration
    - 432nd Main Military Clinical Medical Centre
    - 592nd Military Clinical Medical Centre
    - 1134th Military Clinical Medical Centre
    - 23rd Sanitary and Epidemiological Centre
    - 222nd Medical Centre of the Air Force and Air Defence Forces
    - 223rd Aviation Medicine Centre of the Air Force and Air Defence Forces
    - 2335th Storage Base for Medical Equipment and Property
  - Housing Management
- Other elements
  - Sports Committee of the Armed Forces
  - General Financial and Economic Department
  - Legal Department
  - Central Archives
  - Dog Training Centre (Kolodishchi)

=== Military educational institutions ===
- Military Academy of Belarus
- Minsk Suvorov Military School
- Border Guard Service Institute of Belarus
- Belarusian State University
- Belarusian State University of Informatics and Radioelectronics
- Belarusian National Technical University
- Belarusian State Medical University
- Grodno State University
- Belarusian State University of Transport
- Belarusian State Academy of Aviation

== Leaders ==
=== Ministers of Defence ===
- Pyotr Chaus (1992)
- Pavel Kozlovski (1992–1994)
- Anatoly Kostenko (1994–1995)
- Leonid Maltsev (first term, 1996)
- Aleksandr Chumakov (1996–2001)
- Leonid Maltsev (second term, 2001–2009)
- Yury Zhadobin (2009–2014)
- Andrei Ravkov (2014–2020)
- Viktor Khrenin (2020–present)

=== First Deputy Minister of Defence — Chief of the General Staff ===
- Nikolay Churkin (1992–1994)
- Leonid Maltsev (1994–1995)
- Aleksandr Chumakov (1995–1997)
- Mikhail Kozlov (1997–2001)
- Sergey Gurulev (2001–2009)
- Petr Tikhonovsky (2009–2013)
- Oleg Belokonev (2014–2019)
- Alexander Volfovich (2020–2021)
- Viktor Gulevich (2021–2024)
- Pavel Muraveiko (2024–present)

=== Deputy Ministers of Defence ===
- Vladimir Uskhopchik (2000–2004)
- Yuri Merentsov (2004–2009)
- Mikhail Puzikov (2009–2015)
- Sergei Potapenko (2016–2021)
- Andrey Zhuk (2021–2024)
- Alyaksandr Naumenka (2024-)

== Defence ministry building ==
In the late 1940s, a hill above Svislach, Pukhavichy District, was used to lay the foundation for the HQ of the Byelorussian Military District. The project was entrusted to the architect Valentin Gusev, who risked not demolishing the ancient buildings surrounding it. It later became the defence ministry in 1992.

== Symbols ==
=== Emblem ===
The heraldic sign - the emblem of the Ministry of Defence of the Republic of Belarus was approved in April 2003. The heraldic sign is a stylized golden image of the emblem of the Armed Forces, located in the center of a red figured shield (baroque type). The border of the shield is silvery.

=== Banner ===
The banner of the Ministry of Defence of the Republic of Belarus was approved by the decree of the President on November 17, 2000. The banner consists of a double panel, a staff with a pommel and an inflow, a cord with tassels and a banner ribbon.

== Media ==
- Military News Agency "Vayar" (includes the newspaper "To the Glory of the Motherland", the magazine "Army", and the TV show "Arsenal")
- Ministry of Defence website
- Microblog
