= Security Council of Belarus =

Security Council of the Republic of Belarus
- Савет бяспекі Рэспублікі Беларусь
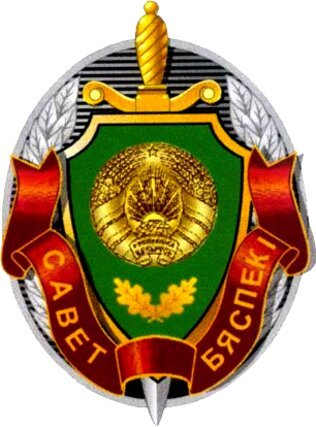
- Emblem of the Belarusian Security Council

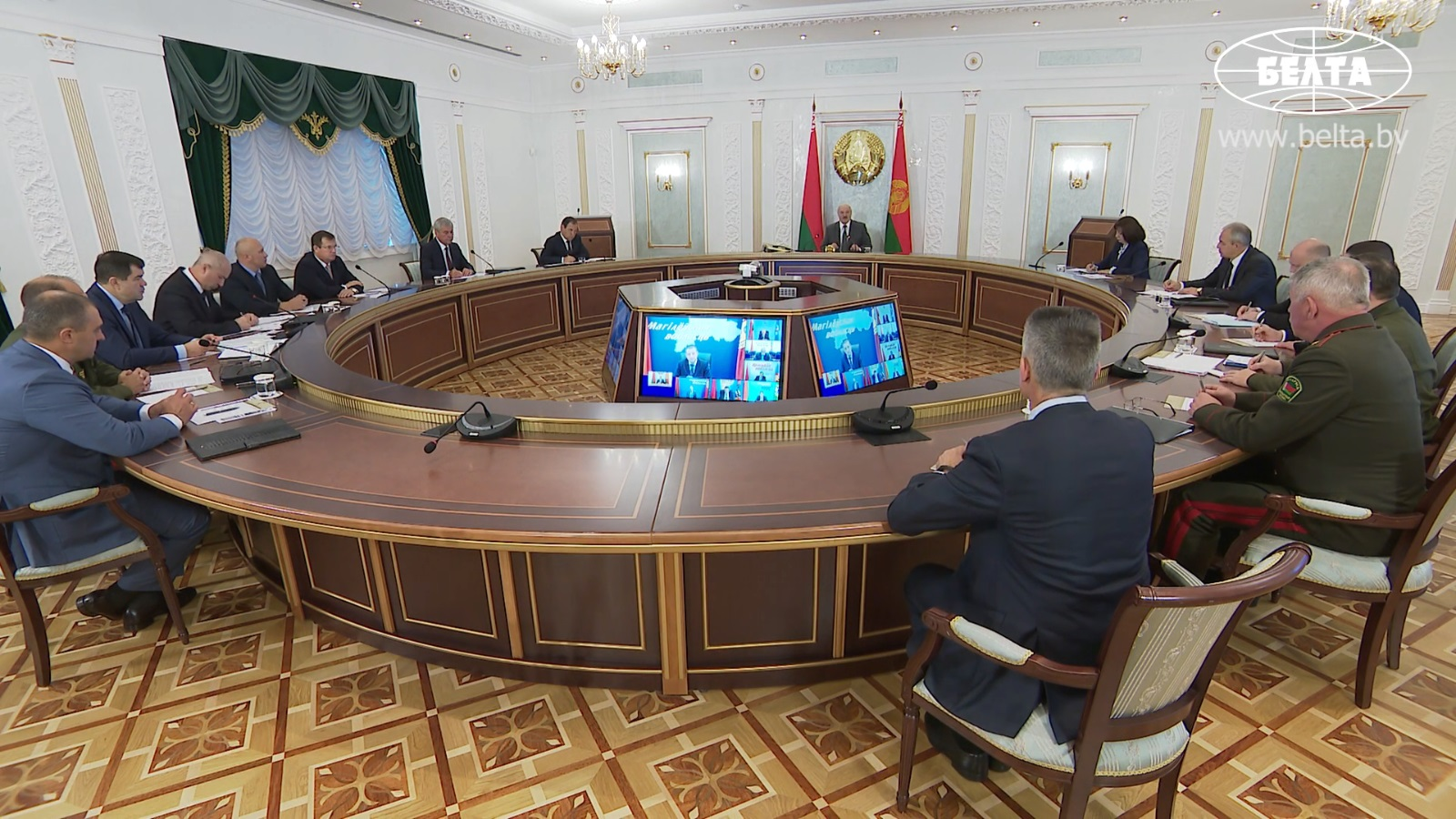
- A council meeting at the Independence Palace

Agency overview
- Formed: 15 November 1991; 35 years ago
- Preceding agency: Security Council of the Soviet Union
- Jurisdiction: Belarus
- Headquarters: Minsk, Belarus
- Agency executives: Chairman, President Alexander Lukashenko; State Secretary, Alexander Volfovich
- Website: president.gov.by/ru/president/glavnokomanduyushchiy/sovet-bezopasnosti

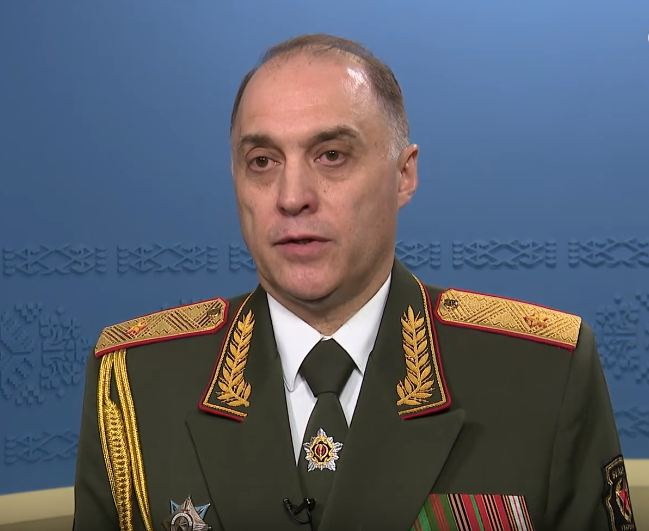
Alexander Volfovich

The Security Council of the Republic of Belarus (Belarusian: Савет бяспекі Рэспублікі Беларусь, Saviet biaśpieki Respubliki Bielaruś; Russian: Совет безопасности Республики Беларусь) is an interdepartmental body with a mandate to ensure the security of the Republic of Belarus. It considers internal and external affairs of the state with regard to the interest of maintaining security and defense. The Council was established upon the adoption of Resolution +1249 on 15 November 1991. The current Secretary of the Council is Alexander Volfovich.

== History ==
It was established on November 15, 1991, when the Supreme Soviet of Belarus approved decision No. 1249, which established a 14 member Security Council, which included the then Commander of the Belarusian Military District, the Chairman of the Supreme Council, his First Deputy and the Chairman of the Supreme Council Commission on National Security, the Chairman of the Council of Ministers, the Prosecutor General, the Chairman of the KGB, the Ministers of Defense, Foreign and Internal Affairs, Communications and Transport, the heads of the Belarusian Railways and the Civil Aviation Directorate. The Chairman of the Supreme Council was the Chairman of the Security Council and appointed an assistant to himself as the head of the Security Council apparatus, which consisted of 4 employees. Meetings were convened twice a year. In 1992-1994, the Security Council was headed by Stanislav Shushkevich, then Myechyslaw Hryb.

In accordance with the 1994 Belarusian Constitution, the chairman of the council was the President of Belarus, in their position as head of state and Commander-in-chief. On August 5, 1994, A. Lukashenko introduced the head of the Presidential Administration and the state secretary of the Security Council into the Security Council by Decree No. 24 instead of the chairman of the Supreme Council and the chairman of the Supreme Council commission on national security. Meetings began to be held every three months.

In 1997, the Security Council apparatus, headed by the State Secretary, was renamed to the secretariat.

== Powers ==
The Security Council's powers include:

- Submitting proposals to the President regarding domestic and foreign policies
- Coordinate activities of government authorities
- Put forward early solutions to prevent emergency situations

=== Increased powers ===
In April 2021, President Lukashenko announced intentions to amend existing statutes for the emergency transfer of presidential power, making the Security Council the collective head of state should the President be killed. The Prime Minister would head the security council in place of the president. He signed the decree on 9 May, after the Victory Day celebrations. Justifying the decision, he noted that two-thirds of the council are civilians.

== Composition of members ==
It is currently composed of 20 people:

- President of Belarus
- Prime Minister of Belarus
- Chairman of the House of Representatives
- Chairman of the Council of the Republic
- Chairman of the Supreme Court
- Head of the Presidential Administration of Belarus
- State Secretary
- Prosecutor General
- Chairman of the National Bank
- Chairman of the State Security Committee of the Republic of Belarus
- Minister of Defense
- Minister of Foreign Affairs
- Minister of Internal Affairs
- Minister of Emergency Situations
- Chairman of the Investigation
- Chief of the General Staff

Viktor Lukashenko, the senior son of President Alexander Lukashenko, is also a member of the council (since January 2007), being the National Security Advisor.

== State Secretaries ==
- Viktor Sheiman (August 5, 1994—November 27, 2000)
- Ural Latypov (November 27, 2000—September 12, 2001)
- Gennady Nevyglas (September 12, 2001—July 15, 2008)

March 20, 2006 – July 8, 2008

- Yuri Zhadobin (July 15, 2008—December 4, 2009)
- Leonid Maltsev (December 4, 2009—December 5, 2013)
- Alexander Mezhuyev (December 5, 2013—November 4, 2015)
- Stanislav Zas (November 4, 2015—January 20, 2020)
- Andrei Ravkov (January 20-September 3, 2020)
- Valery Vakulchik (September 3, 2020—October 29, 2020)
- Alexander Volfovich (since January 26, 2021)
