= United Belarusian Military School =

United Belarusian Military School Объединённая белорусская военная школа

Location
- Minsk, Byelorussian SSR; Soviet Union

Information
- School type: Military school
- Opened: 1921
- Closed: 1941
- Headmaster: Jānis Fabriciuss (1922–1923)

The United Belarusian Military School named after Central Executive Committee of the Byelorussian SSR (Russian: Объединённая белорусская военная школа; OBVSH) was the normal military school of the Red Army in Minsk between 1921 and 1941. It was used for the training of command staff. During its existence, the school trained 3,500 Army officers.

== History ==
On 5 February 1921, the Revolutionary Military Council of the Byelorussian SSR in Minsk organized short-term 81st Infantry commanders courses in a former seminary. The school was renamed as the courses of the Peoples' Commissars of the Byelorussian SSR in the same year. In 1921, it was again renamed "Minsk Infantry Training of the Red Army", managed by the People's Commissariat of Defence. On 9 October 1924, the 7th United Belarusian Military School was organized from these organizations, with a three-year training period. The school focused on preparing staff commanders for the cavalry, infantry, and the artillery of the Red Army. Almost a third of the curriculum was devoted to general education subjects. Students received training in squad tactics during the second year and platoon tactics in the last year of study. The school initially trained officers for the 2nd Rifle Division.

In February 1931, in honor of Kliment Voroshilov's 50th birthday, eight students from the school skied from Minsk to Moscow. On its 10th anniversary in the same year, the school was awarded the Order of the Red Banner of Labour. On 8 September 1933, Mikhail Kalinin visited the school, which was soon renamed after Kalinin, becoming the Minsk Military Infantry School named after Mikhail Kalinin. The school was closed after Operation Barbarossa.

After the war, the Minsk Suvorov Military School was established in the same building on 21 May 1952.

== Notable alumni ==
- Vasily Margelov, commander of the Soviet Airborne Troops
- Ivan Yakubovsky, Marshal of the Soviet Union
