= Vladimir Uskhopchik =

Belarusian general

Colonel General Vladimir Uskhopchik
- Уладзімір Мікітавіч Усхопчык
- Born: 7 January 1946 (age 80); Rivne Oblast, Belarusian SSR Soviet Union
- Military career
- Allegiance: USSR (to 1991); Belarus
- Branch: Soviet Army; Belarusian Ground Forces
- Service years: 1967–2004
- Rank: Colonel General

Vladimir Nikitovich Uskhopchik (Belarusian: Уладзі́мір Мікі́тавіч Усхо́пчык, Russian: Влади́мир Ники́тич Усхо́пчик, born January 7, 1946) is a Belarusian general. In 1991, Uskhopchik was commander of the Vilnius garrison during the January Events in Lithuania. He was later sentenced in absentia to 14 years in prison for his role in the killings.

== Early life and career ==
In 1967, he graduated from the Kiev Higher Combined Arms Command School (now the Odesa Military Academy). In 1980, he graduated from the Frunze Military Academy in Moscow. After graduating from officer training school, he served in the Group of Soviet Forces in Germany as a platoon commander, company commander, and chief of staff/deputy commander of a mechanized battalion. From 1974, he served in the Far Eastern Military District as chief of staff/deputy commander of a mechanized battalion, commander of a mechanized battalion, and chief of staff/deputy commander of a mechanized regiment.

In 1980, he was posted to the Baltic Military District as commander of a mechanized regiment. From 1984 to 1986, he served as chief of staff and deputy division commander. He spent the next two years as a military advisor to the Armed Forces of the Democratic Republic of Afghanistan. In January 1989, he assumed command of a mechanized division in the Baltic Military District.

== Service in Lithuania ==
He served as commander of the Vilnius Garrison. His service coincided with the escalation of Lithuanian independence aspirations, which ultimately led to the Lithuanian Republic's secession from the USSR. On January 13, 1991, he commanded a military operation in Vilnius, during which, among other things, a demonstration at the TV Tower was pacified (resulting in the deaths of 14 civilians). Under pressure from international opinion, the Soviet authorities decided to end the assault, and Lithuania achieved full and undisputed independence in the following months. Uskhopchik himself never officially denied his support for the operation.

== In Belarus ==
In July 1991, he was transferred to Brest in the Byelorussian SSR as a division commander. After the collapse of the Soviet Union, he entered the Belarusian Army, rising to the position of corps commander. On May 22, 2000, he became Deputy Minister of Defense of Belarus. He retired on February 19, 2004. In February 2004 he was awarded the Order for Service to the Homeland of the First Class.

The Lithuanian prosecutor's office charged Uskhopchik with complicity in murder and attempted military coup. However, Belarus consistently refused to extradite Uskhopchik. In 2009, during a visit to Lithuania, Belarusian President Alexander Lukashenko suggested that this might change, but at the end of the year, the Prosecutor General's Office in Minsk definitively refused extradition, explaining that in January 1991, the general had acted in accordance with the Soviet constitution.
