= Aleksandr Chumakov (general) =

Belarusian retired colonel general

Colonel-General Aleksandr Petrovich Chumakov
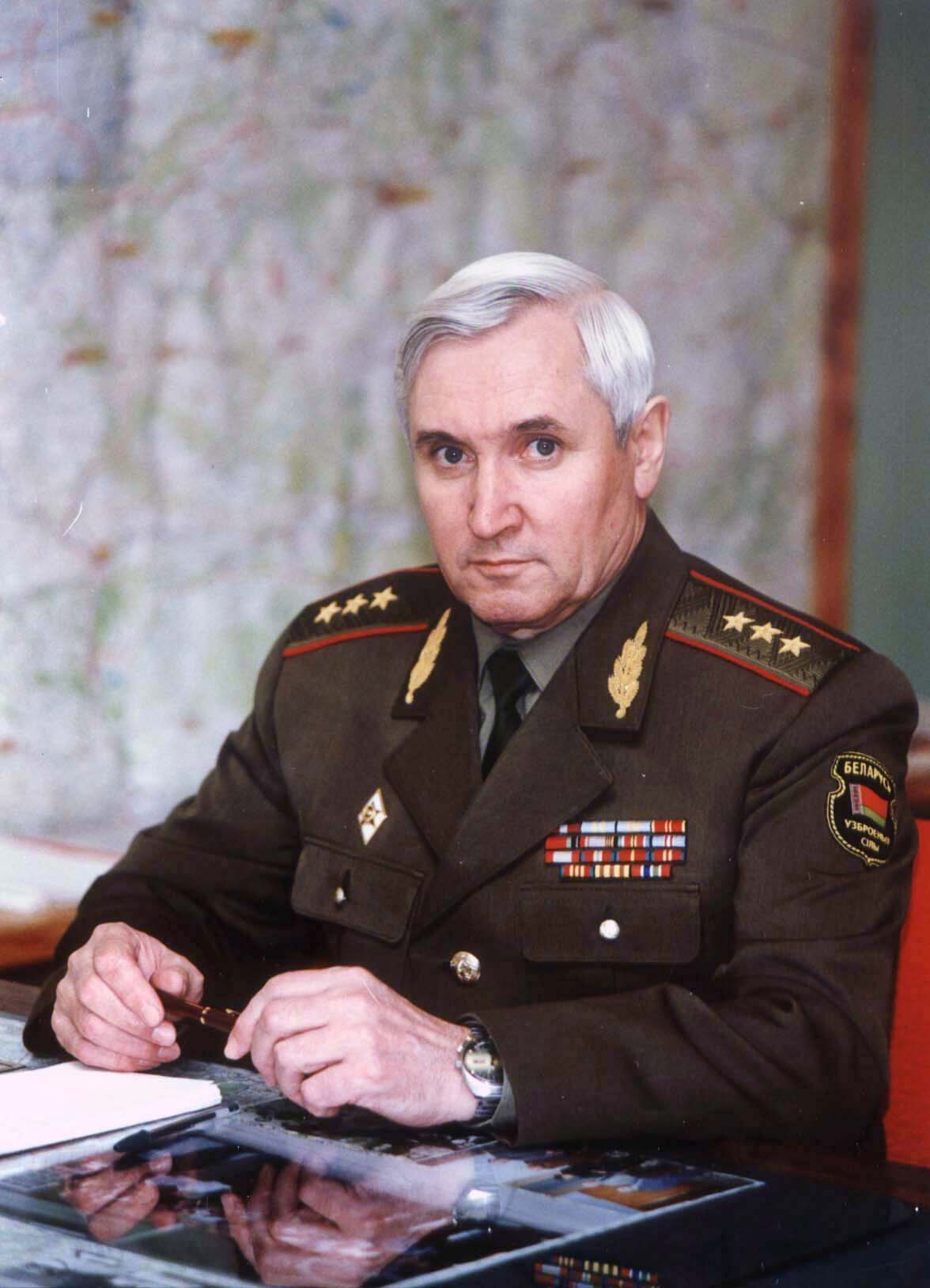

Minister of Defence of Belarus
- In office 1 November 1996 – 28 March 2001
- President: Alexander Lukashenko
- Preceded by: Leonid Maltsev
- Succeeded by: Leonid Maltsev

Personal details
- Born: 26 November 1941 (age 84) Ilyinka, Dubovsky District, Rostov Oblast, Soviet Union
- Education: Odessa Higher Combined Arms Command School; Frunze Military Academy
- Awards: Order for Service to the Homeland 1st class; Order of the Red Star; Order for Service to the Homeland in the Armed Forces of the USSR 2nd and 3rd class

Military service
- Allegiance: Soviet Union; Russia; Belarus
- Branch/service: Soviet Army; Russian Ground Forces; Armed Forces of Belarus
- Years of service: 1958–2001
- Rank: Colonel General
- Commands: 120th Guards Motor Rifle Division (later 5th Guards Separate Army Corps); 20th Guards Army; General Staff of the Armed Forces of Belarus; Ministry of Defence of Belarus

Aleksandr Petrovich Chumakov (Belarusian: Аляксандр Пятровіч Чумакоў; Russian: Александр Петрович Чумаков; born on 26 November 1941) is a retired Belarusian Army colonel general and former Minister of Defence of Belarus.

Chumakov commanded the 120th Guards Motor Rifle Division from 1980. In June 1986, he became commander of the 20th Guards Army. In August 1988, he became chief of staff of the Belorussian Military District. After serving as a Soviet adviser in North Korea, Chumakov was a member of the Russian military contingent in Transnistria. Between December 1995 and October 1996, he was chief of the General Staff of the Armed Forces of Belarus.

He was the Minister of Defence of Belarus from 1 November 1996 to 28 March 2001. Chumakov's term took place between Leonid Maltsev's two non-consecutive terms as Minister of Defence.

== Early life ==
Chumakov was born on 26 November 1941 during World War II to Pyotr Grigoryevich Chumakov and Marya Grigoryevna Chumakova in the village of Ilyinka, Dubovsky District in Rostov Oblast. His father, a Gosbank inspector, served with the Red Army and survived the war, reaching the rank of Senior Lieutenant. Chumakov spent the war in Ilyinka, living with his mother and grandparents. After German troops occupied the village, the family was evicted from their home and had to live in a shed. He entered the ten-year Dubovsky Secondary School No. 1 in 1948, graduating in 1958. Chumakov then went to Odessa, where his uncle was the local military commissar, hoping to enter a nautical school, but was rejected because he was too young. His uncle recommended that he instead attend the Odessa Higher Combined Arms Command School, and arranged a birth certificate increasing Chumakov's age by one year. He was thus accepted to the four-year school.

== Military service ==
Graduating from the school in 1962, Chumakov became a motor rifle platoon commander in the 333rd Motor Rifle Regiment of the 118th Motor Rifle Division in September, stationed in Cahul. In 1963 he married local woman Aksenia Rufa, and in 1965 his daughter Irina was born. Chumakov successively served as a training platoon commander, deputy training company commander, and motor rifle company commander in the Odessa Military District. In August 1967 he entered the Frunze Military Academy, graduating in June 1970. From then until July 1978 Chumakov served in the Transcaucasian Military District as a motor rifle battalion commander, chief of staff and deputy commander of a motor rifle regiment, commander of a motor rifle regiment, and chief of staff and deputy commander of a motor rifle division. His son Viktor was born in 1971.

Chumakov entered the Military Academy of the General Staff in July 1978, graduating in 1980. In August of that year he took command of the Belorussian Military District's 120th Guards Motor Rifle Division at Uruchche, leading the division during the Zapad-81 exercises. Chumakov continued to command the division when it was expanded into the 5th Guards Separate Army Corps in June 1982. In June 1986, he was transferred to command the 20th Guards Army of the Group of Soviet Forces in Germany. On 16 February 1988, he was promoted to lieutenant general. Chumakov returned to Belarus in August of that year to become the Belorussian Military District's chief of staff and first deputy commander. In June 1991 he was sent as an advisor to North Korea, and served with the Russian military contingent in Transnistria until July 1995. In December of that year, Chumakov became Chief of the General Staff of the Armed Forces of Belarus and First Deputy Minister of Defence.

In October 1996, Chumakov became acting Minister of Defense. The position was made permanent in January 1997. On 18 March, he was promoted to Colonel General. Along with then-Prime Minister Vladimir Yermoshin and the Speaker of the Chamber of Representatives, Chumakov made up a group of ethnic Russians in key Belarusian government positions. In February 2000, he discussed a plan for cooperation between Armenia and Belarus with his Armenian counterpart, Vagharshak Harutiunyan during the latter's visit to Belarus focused around Armenian use of Belarusian military plants for upgrading Armenian military equipment. On 28 March 2001 he was replaced by Leonid Maltsev. Chumakov retired due to his age in December of that year. Chumakov was elected a deputy of the Supreme Soviet of the Byelorussian Soviet Socialist Republic for its tenth convocation. Between 1982 and 1984, he was a deputy of the Minsk City Soviet. During his military career, he was awarded the Order for Service to the Homeland 1st class, the Order of the Red Star, and the Order for Service to the Homeland in the Armed Forces of the USSR 2nd and 3rd class.
