= Leonid Maltsev =

Belarusian colonel general

- Леанід Мальцаў; Леонид Мальцев
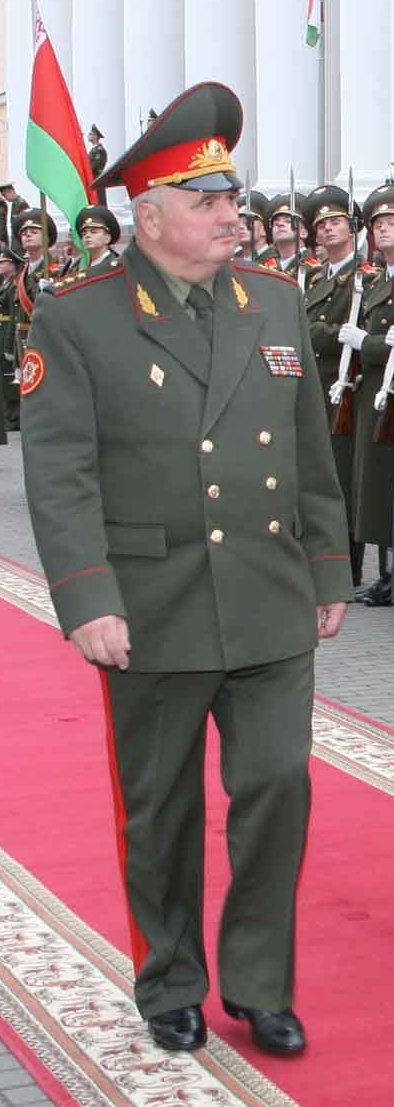

State Secretary of Security Council of Belarus
- In office 4 December 2009 – 5 December 2013
- President: Alexander Lukashenko
- Preceded by: Yuri Zhadobin
- Succeeded by: Alexander Mezhuyev

Minister of Defence of Belarus
- In office 15 October 1995 – 1 November 1996
- President: Alexander Lukashenko
- Preceded by: Anatoly Kostenko
- Succeeded by: Aleksandr Chumakov
- In office 24 September 2001 – 4 December 2009
- Preceded by: Aleksandr Chumakov
- Succeeded by: Yuri Zhadobin

Chairman of the State Border Committee
- In office 2 November 2013 – 27 December 2016
- Preceded by: Alexander Boechko
- Succeeded by: Anatoly Lappo

Personal details
- Born: 29 August 1949 (age 76) Grodno Region, Belarusian SSR, Soviet Union

Military service
- Allegiance: Soviet Union; Belarus
- Branch/service: Soviet Army; Belarusian Ground Forces
- Years of service: 1967–2009
- Rank: Colonel general

Colonel General Leonid Semyonovich Maltsev (Russian: Леонид Семёнович Мальцев, Belarusian: Леанід Сямёнавіч Мальцаў; born August 29, 1949) is a retired Belarusian Ground Forces officer. He served as the Minister of Defence of Belarus twice (1995–1996 and 2001–2009) and the Chief of the General Staff of the Armed Forces of Belarus (1994–1995).

== Early life and education ==
He served in the Soviet Army from 1967 after graduation from Minsk Suvorov Military School. In 1971, Maltsev graduated from Kiev Higher Military Command School (cum laude).

== Military career ==
He served in the Group of Soviet Forces in Germany as an infantry platoon commander. In this function, he was involved in the downfall of Walter Ulbricht and the rise to power of Erich Honecker, the latter of whom had struck a deal with the Soviet leadership under Brezhnev to replace Ulbricht. In late April 1971, Maltsev and Yuri Bassistov secretly escorted Central Committee member Werner Lamberz to Moscow for a discussion with Brezhnev (aside from Maltsev and Bassistov, only Soviet ambassador Pyotr Abrasimov knew of the operation). This led to Ulbricht stepping down a few days later.

In 1972 he became a mechanized infantry company commander. In 1974 he was the commander of a motorized rifle battalion. In 1979 he graduated from Frunze Military Academy.

In 1979 Maltsev served in the Far East Military District as a deputy commander of the infantry regiment and in 1980 as the commander of a motorized rifle regiment of the school, in 1982 as a Chief of Staff Motorized Rifle Division, and in 1986 as a Commander Infantry Division. From 1987 to 1990 he was a head of the district training center for junior professionals in Far Eastern Military District (Chita). In 1992 Maltsev graduated from the General Staff Academy in Moscow (with honors). After graduation from the Academy in 1992 he started serving in Armed Forces of Belarus.

On July 10, 1992 he became first deputy commander of the 28th Combined Arms Army, after the reduction and on 7 April 1993 he was appointed commander of the 28th Army Corps.

In August 1994 Maltsev became Chief of Staff - First Deputy Minister of Defense of the Republic of Belarus.

On October 10, 1995 he was appointed Belarus Minister of Defense.

On November 1, 1996 he was fired from the post of Minister of Defence of the Republic of Belarus "for misconduct discrediting the rank of officer (appearance in a public place while intoxicated)».

In March 1997 on the decision of the Council of Defense Ministers of the CIS, he was appointed First Deputy Chief of Staff for Coordinating Military Cooperation of the CIS.

On November 29, 2000 he was appointed Deputy State Secretary of the Security Council.

From September 24, 2001 to December 4, 2009 he again served as the Minister of Defense. He succeeded Aleksandr Petrovich Chumakov.

From December 4, 2009 to November 2, 2013 Leonid Maltsev served as State Secretary of Security Council. From 2014 to 2016, he served as the head of State Border Committee of the Republic of Belarus.
