= Northwestern Operational Command =

Northwestern Operational Command (2001–present) 65th Army Corps (1994–2001) 7th Army Corps (1993–1994) 7th Tank Army (1957–1993) 7th Mechanized Army (1949–1957) 7th Separate Tank Division (1947–1949) 7th Mechanized Army (1946–1947) 65th Army (1942–1946)
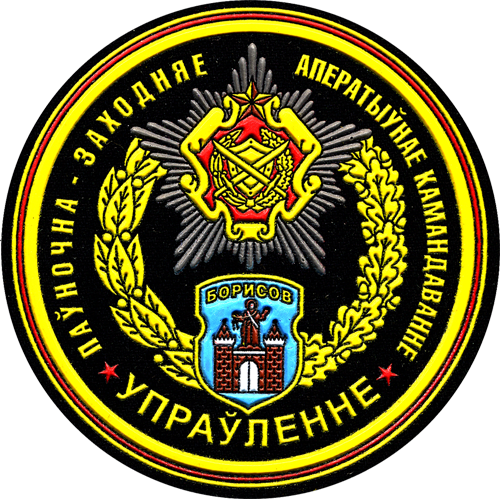
- Active: 2001- (current form)
- Country: Belarus
- Branch: Belarus Ground Forces
- Type: Command
- Garrison/HQ: Barysaw
- Engagements: World War II: Operation Uranus; Operation Ring; Battle of Kursk; Lower Dnieper Offensive; Operation Bagration; Lublin-Brest Offensive; East Pomeranian Offensive; Berlin Strategic Offensive

Commanders
- Commander: Alyaksandr Bas
- Chief of Staff: Vadzim Shadura
- Notable commanders: Colonel General Pavel Batov; Major General Alexander Volfovich

The Northwestern Operational Command (SZOK) is a command of the Belarus Ground Forces. It is headquartered at Borisov and is commanded by Major General Alyaksandr Bas. The command includes a mechanized brigade and a mixed artillery brigade. It was formed in 2001 from the 65th Army Corps.

The command traces its lineage to the 65th Army of the Red Army, a field army of the Soviet Union during World War II. It was formed in October 1942 from rebuilding elements of the first formation of the 4th Tank Army on the Don Front. The army was commanded by Pavel Batov until after the fall of Berlin, and served in various Fronts commanded by Konstantin Rokossovsky for the duration of the war.

Postwar, the 65th Army was moved to the Belorussian Military District, where it became the 7th Mechanized Army. In 1957 it became the 7th Tank Army. With the dissolution of the Soviet Union the army became part of the Belarus Ground Forces and was downsized into the 7th Army Corps in 1993. A year later it was renamed the 65th Army Corps.

== History ==
=== Creation and Initial Operations of the 65th Army ===
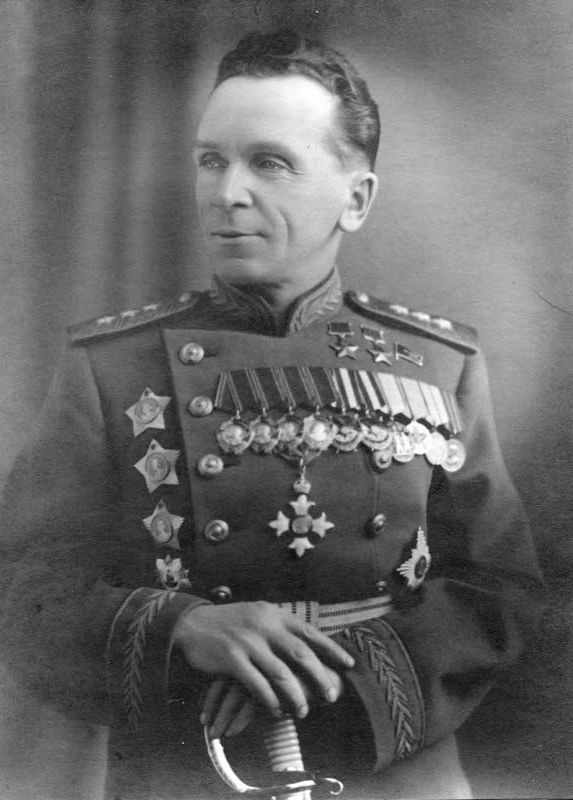
Postwar photo of Colonel-General Pavel Batov

4th Tank Army, under command of Maj. Gen. Vasily Kryuchenkin, launched numerous counterattacks against the German corridor to Stalingrad from August to October, 1942, until it was severely depleted in strength. (It was derisively known for a time as the "four-tank army" due to the few vehicles still operational.)

Pavel Batov, who had previously commanded the 51st Army and the 3rd Army, assumed command on October 22, 1942, a command he would hold until the end of the War. He had orders to rebuild these forces as a combined-arms army, the 65th Army, as part of Rokossovsky's new Don Front. This was accomplished by mid-November, and at this time the army consisted of:

- 3 Guards Rifle Divisions (4th, 27th, 40th)
- 6 Rifle Divisions (23rd, 24th, 252nd, 258th, 304th, 321st)
- 2 Separate Tank Brigades (91st, 121st)
- 3 Army Artillery Regiments, 1 Howitzer Regiment, 5 Guards Mortar Regiments, and supporting units.

65th Army played a leading role in Operation Uranus, the encirclement of the German forces at Stalingrad. Attacking out of the Kremenskaya bridgehead on the south bank of the Don. Rokossovsky later wrote in reference to Batov and his army:

"[He] displayed fine initiative with an improvised mobile task force... By striking at the enemy's flank and rear, the task force ensured the swift advance of the other units."

In the lead up to Operation Ring the 65th mounted an attack by two rifle divisions against the positions of the German 44th Infantry Division on January 7, 1943. This attack penetrated the German defensive line and inflicted severe casualties. A counterattack by German armor contained the Soviet advance, but did not regain the original line, consumed scarce fuel and ammunition, and exposed the vehicles to concentrated artillery fire, leading to losses.

When Ring kicked off at 0805 hours on January 10, 65th Army was backed by a 55-minute artillery barrage from over 500 guns and howitzers and 450 rocket launchers on an attack front of 12 km, the highest density of Soviet artillery achieved to that point of the war. This was followed by air attacks from the 16th Air Army against positions to the rear of the main German line. About 0900 hours, shock groups of five rifle divisions of the Army, supported by the 91st Tank Brigade and six Guards heavy tank regiments (60-70 KV tanks and 21 Churchill Mark IV tanks). The front of the 44th Division was smashed quite quickly and four depleted battalions were overrun.

=== Redeployment to Central Front ===
Following the German surrender at Stalingrad, Rokossovsky's forces were redeployed northwest to become the new Central Front in the region around Kursk. 65th Army exploited a gap between the weak Second German Army and the Second Panzer Army, but was brought to a halt by the spring rasputitsa, German reserves released by their evacuation of the Rzhev Salient, and the German counter-offensive to the south of Kursk. 65th Army then dug in during the three-month lull in operations, towards the northwestern sector of the Kursk salient.

At this time the order of battle of the 65th Army was as follows:

- 18th Rifle Corps (69th, 149th and 246th Rifle Divisions)
- 27th Rifle Corps (60th and 193rd Rifle Divisions and 115th Rifle Brigade)
- 37th Guards, 181st, 194th and 354th Rifle Divisions
- 4 Separate Tank Regiments, 2 Antitank Regiments, 2 Mortar Regiments, 2 Guards Mortar Regiments, and other support units

Army strength: 100,000, 1,837 guns and mortars, 124 tanks and self-propelled guns.

Due to its position in the western sector of the salient, the 65th emerged mostly unscathed from the Battle of Kursk, and was well equipped to exploit the German defeat. In late July and August the Army joined in the pursuit of German forces to the Dnepr River. On 15 Oct., with divisional and army artillery firing 1,000 shells per minute in support, the 193rd Rifle Division forced a crossing of the Dnepr. From this point on, the 65th Army began earning a well-deserved reputation for its abilities in river-crossing and bridgehead operations.

=== Operation Bagration ===
Rokossovsky's command was renamed 1st Belorussian Front, and in June, 1944, 65th Army took part in major strategic operations in Belorussia. The Army's order of battle at this time was as follows:

- 18th Rifle Corps (37th Guards, 44th Guards and 69th Rifle Divisions)
- 105th Rifle Corps (75th Guards, 193rd and 354th Rifle Divisions)
- 15th and 356th Rifle Divisions, and 115th Rifle Brigade
- 1st Guards Tank Corps (15th, 16th, 17th Guards Tank Brigades, and 1st Guards Motorized Rifle Brigade)
- 1 Separate Tank Regiment and 4 Separate Self-propelled Artillery Regiments, and other support units.

In a well-known confrontation at the planning stage, Rokossovski convinced Stalin that, given the terrain, it was better to strike two strong blows against the German forces than just one. He was counting on Batov's ability to lead his Army across swampy regions south of Bobruisk, using corduroy roads, swamp shoes, and other means. 65th Army did not disappoint, and within a few days the German Ninth Army was encircled and mostly destroyed. For his performance, Batov was promoted to Colonel General.

65th Army crossed the Bug River on July 22, and pushed on to cross the Narev River, north of Warsaw, by Sept. 4. Operation Bagration had run out of steam, but Batov's army held off strong German counterattacks against the Narev bridgehead for more than two months. Following this, Rokossovski was reassigned to command of 2nd Belorussian Front. A shift in Front boundaries accompanied this, and 65th and 70th Armies became part of his new command. In the following months forces were built up in the Narev bridgehead for an offensive to be launched in January.

=== Into Germany ===
During the new offensive, 65th Army forced a crossing of the Vistula River in early February. Rokossovski later noted:

"I had been with 65th Army since Stalingrad and had had ample opportunity to observe the splendid combat qualities of its men, commanders, and, of course, Pavel Batov, a brave and talented soldier."

In March, 1945, the order of battle of 65th Army was as follows:

- 18th Rifle Corps (16th and 69th Rifle Divisions)
- 46th Rifle Corps (108th, 186th and 413th Rifle Divisions)
- 105th Rifle Corps (44th Guards, 193rd, and 354th Rifle Divisions)
- 1 Separate Tank Regiment and 1 Separate Self-propelled Artillery Regiment, and other support units.

For the Danzig operation the army also had the 66th Guards SU Brigade attached, the Red Army's only heavy SU brigade, a potent force of 60 ISU-122 self-propelled guns.

The offensive propelled 65th Army into eastern Germany, finally to the Oder River, near Stettin-an-Oder, where it once again forced a difficult river crossing in April 1945. Officials of the city surrendered to Colonel A. G. Frolenkov's 193rd Rifle Division on April 26.

In Demmin on and around May 1, 1945, members of the 65th Army of the 2nd Belorussian Front first broke into a distillery and then rampaged through the town, committing mass rapes, arbitrarily executing civilians, and setting fire to buildings. Many Demmin civilians committed suicide.

=== Cold War ===
In April 1946, the 65th Army was reorganised as the 7th Mechanised Army at Łódź. On 20 December, it became the 7th Tank Division (Mobilization), with its divisions becoming regiments. It was headquartered in Borisov from May 1948. On 21 March 1950, it was increased in strength to an army with its old designation. In 1955 the 7th Mechanized Army was equipped with the IS-3, T-54, T-34 and PT-76 tanks, as well as the ISU-122 self-propelled gun.

In 1957, the 7th Mechanized Army was transformed into 7th Tank Army.

- The 10th Tank Division was reformed in the 34th Tank Division
- 15th Guards Mechanized Division was reformed in the 47th Guards Tank Division
- 27th Guards Mechanized Division – the 39th Guards Tank Division.

In 1960, the 47th Guards Tank Division was renamed the 45th Guards Tank Division.

In 1965, the 45th Guards Rivne Tank Division became a training tank formation subordinated to the Belorussian Military District, and the 39th Guards Tank Division was reorganized into the 37th Guards Rechitsa Tank Division.

From 1960 to 1980, the basis of the 7th Tank Army was formed by the 3rd Guards Kotelnikovo, the 34th Dnieper, and the 37th Guards Rechitsa Tank Divisions. The formation actively participated in well-known large-scale exercises and maneuvers such as "Dnepr", "Neman", "Dvina", Exercise Zapad-81 and "Fall 88". By a Decree of the Presidium of the Supreme Soviet on 15 January 1974, for good results in combat training, the 7th Tank Army was awarded the Order of the Red Banner. A USSR Ministry of Defense directive dated 25 January 1989 ordered the disbandment of the 3rd Guards Tank Division, effective from 1 June 1989. Instead, the 19th Guards Nikolaevsk-Budapest Tank Division was moved from the Southern Group of Forces in Hungary to Zaslonovo. On 7 November 1990 Tank Army had 764 T-62 and T-72 tanks, 208 infantry fighting vehicles and armored personnel carriers, as well as 212 guns, mortars and multiple rocket launchers. It also included the Scud-equipped 76th Rocket Brigade.

=== Service in the Belarus Ground Forces ===
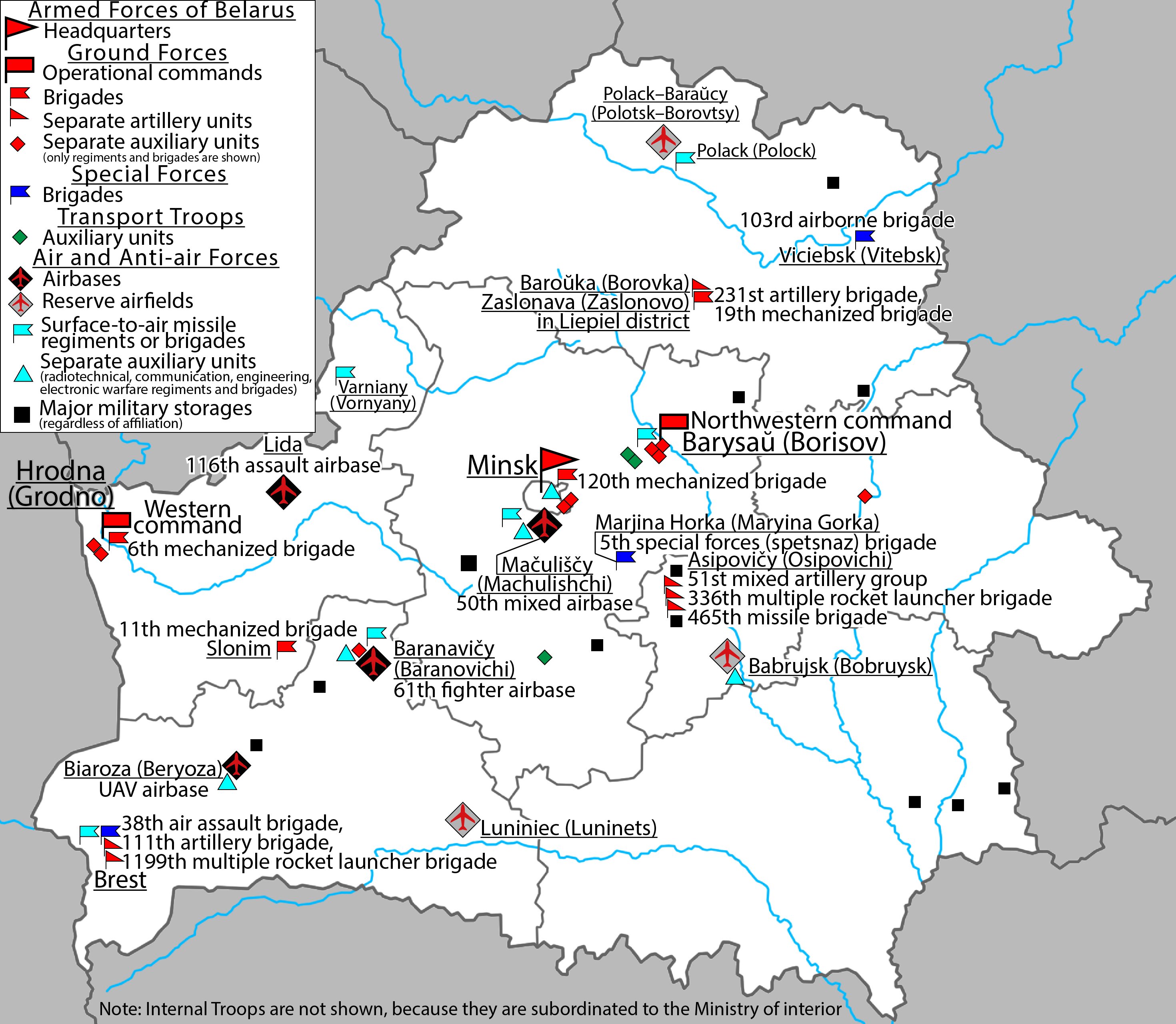
Map showing main military units of the Belarusian Armed Forces

After the collapse of the Soviet Union, the Armed Forces of the Republic of Belarus were created on the basis of the Belorussian Military District, including the 7th Tank Army. In 1993, the 7th Tank Army was renamed the 7th Army Corps, and in 1994 the 65th Army Corps. In December 2001, as a result of the reform of the Armed Forces of Belarus, the corps was transformed into the North-Western Operational Command (NWOC). Since then the troops and staff of the NWOC have participated in the exercises "Neman-2001", "Berezina-2002", "The Shield of the Fatherland – 2004", "Shield of the Union – 2006", "West-2009" and others. A joint operational exercise of the armed forces of the Republic of Belarus and the Russian Federation, "Shield of the Union", was held in 2011. The exercise was held at the Ashuluk range in Astrakhan Oblast in the Russian Federation. The command participated in exercise "West-2011".

== Units ==
The following units are part of the Northwestern Operational Command.

- 120th Guards Rogachevskaya Mechanised Brigade (339th Guards Mechanized Group of tank and motorized infantry battalions, 334th and 355th Tank Battalions, 356th Motorized Rifle Battalion, 310th Artillery Group, 149th Separate Communications Battalion, 126th Separate Engineer Battalion, 82nd Repair and Refurbishment Battalion, Minsk)
- 231st Mixed Artillery Brigade (Borovka)
- 427th Multiple Rocket Launcher Regiment
- 502nd Anti-Tank Artillery Regiment (Osipovichi)
- 740th Minsk Anti-Aircraft Rocket Brigade (with SAM "Osa"; Borisov)
- 42nd Separate Signal (Radio) Battalion
- 60th Communications Regiment
- 258th Security and Service Battalion
- 121st Scientific Topographical Unit

Electronic warfare troops:

- 244th Signals Intelligence Center
- 10th Electronic Warfare Battalion

Corps of Engineers:

- 7th Torun Order of Alexander Nevsky and the Red Star Engineering Regiment (Borisov)

Storage Bases:

- 814th Service Center (includes 2 repair battalions, Borisov)
- 19th Nikolaevsk-Budapest Red Banner Order of Suvorov 2nd class Base for Storage of Weapons and Equipment (former 19th Guards Mechanized Brigade, Zaslonovo, Lyepyel District)
- 34th Dneprovskaya Base for Storage of Weapons Technology – possibly disbanded (former 34th Tank Division, Borisov)
- 37th Rechitkaya Base for Storage of Weapons and Equipment (former 37th Guards Tank Division; Polotsk)

== Leadership ==
=== Commanders ===
- Major General Andrei Ravkov (2012 - 2014)
- Major General Alexander Volfovich (15 January 2015-2018)
- Major General Andrei Zhuk (2018 - March 2021)
- Major General Alyaksandr Naumenka (11 March 2021 - 17 July 2024)
- Major General Alyaksandr Bas (17 July 2024 - present)

=== Chiefs of Staff - First Deputy Commanders ===
- Major General Valery Gnilozub (15 January 2015 - ?)
- Major General Vadzim Shadura (20 May 2021 - present)

=== Deputy Commanders ===
- Major General Ihar Kazloy

== See also ==
- List of Soviet armies
