= 120th Guards Mechanised Brigade =

Belarusian Ground Forces formation

Coordinates: 53°56′54″N 27°43′26″E

308th Rifle Division (II) (1942–1943) 120th Guards Rifle Division (1943–1957) 120th Guards Motor Rifle Division (1957–2002) 120th Guards Mechanised Brigade (2002–present)
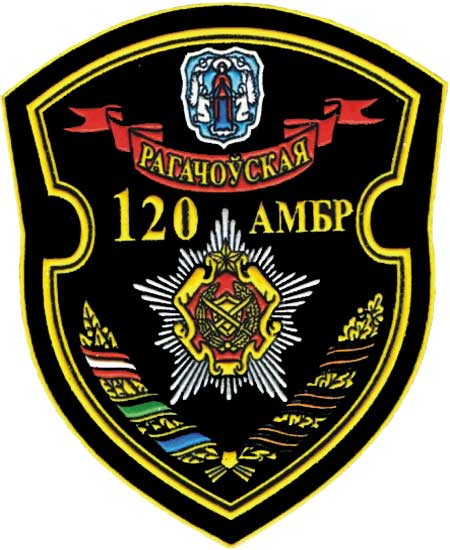
- Active: 1942–present
- Country: Soviet Union (1942–1992); Belarus (1992–present)
- Branch: Soviet Army (1942–1992); Belarusian Ground Forces (1992–present)
- Type: Motorized infantry
- Part of: North Western Operational Command
- Garrison/HQ: Uručča, Minsk
- Engagements: World War II: Battle of Stalingrad; Operation Kutuzov; Berlin Offensive
- Decorations: Order of the Red Banner; Order of Kutuzov; Order of Suvorov
- Battle honours: Rogachev

Commanders
- Current commander: Colonel Vladimir Kulazhin
- Notable commanders: Leonty Gurtyev Aleksandr Petrovich Chumakov

The 120th Guards Mechanised Brigade is a mechanised infantry brigade of the Belarus Ground Forces. It is the heir to the traditions of the Red Army 120th Guards Rifle Division which became the 120th Guards Motor Rifle Division in 1957.

== History ==
=== World War II ===
==== 308th Rifle Division ====
The 120th Guards Rifle Division was formed by redesignation of the Red Army's 308th Rifle Division (Second Formation). The 308th Rifle Division was formed in accordance with Order Number 0044 of the Siberian Military District dated 21 March 1942. It was formed at Omsk in the Siberian Military District, using 20% Red Army men (active duty), 25% returning wounded veterans, 25% reservists from industry, and 30% new recruits from the classes of 1922-23. Most of the recruits and reservists came from Omsk Oblast and Krasnoyarsk Krai. When the division left for the west it had 12,133 officers and men assigned.

The division remained in the Siberian Military District until May 1942 until it was moved to the west. In late May, the division was assigned to the 8th Reserve Army in the Reserve of the Supreme High Command. On 1 June 1942, the division, still with the 8th Reserve Army, was at Saratov. From August 29 to September 6, 1942, the division covered at least 300 kilometers on foot. On 1 August 1942 the 308th Rifle Division was part of the 24th Army in the area of Kotluban. The division joined the active army on 29 August 1942 when it was assigned to the 24th Army on the Stalingrad Front. The first fight in the division took the 24th Army on the territory of the state farm "Kotluban." The division had to seize the hamlet of Borodkin and Heights 133.4, 143.8 and 154.2. Division troops backed 217th Tank Brigade, 136 mortars, heavy artillery regiment in 1936. The enemy forces unleashed on the division powerful artillery fire, mortars, aircraft and tanks.

By the end of September 1942 the division was assigned to the 62nd Army inside Stalingrad. In the fighting at Stalingrad the division arrived came on the night of October 2, 1942, under Colonel Leontii Gurtev. As part of General V.I. Chuikov's 62nd Army, the division seized positions in the area of the "Barricades" plant. The division was finally pulled out of the city and the 62nd Army in December with only 500 men still assigned to the division. For its actions at Stalingrad September to December 1942 it was awarded the Order of the Red Banner by an order dated 19 June 1943.

Reassigned to the Volga Military District to be rebuilt, the division spent the next several months reconstituting its strength. By 1 March 1943, the division was shipped back to the front and assigned to the Kalinin Front reserves and then to the 11th Army in the STAVKA reserves.

The division went back to the front in the 3rd Army of the Bryansk Front in Operation Kutuzov. Distinguishing itself in combat, the division was awarded Guards status and redesignated the 120th Guards Rifle Division. During the remainder of 1943 the division participated in the Orel, Bryansk, and Gomel - Rechitsa operations.

As the 308th Rifle Division, the unit had two commanders. Colonel Leontii Nikolaevich Gurt'ev took over the division on 1 March 1942, was promoted to Major General on 7 December 1942, and was killed in action at Pamanlovo on 3 August 1943. For his actions in taking that town, he became a Hero of the Soviet Union posthumously on 27 August 1943. His successor as division commander was Colonel Nikolai Kuz'mich Maslennikov, who took over officially on 4 August 1943 and was promoted to Major General on 22 September 1943. Maslennikov was commander until the 308th became the 120th Guards Rifle Division in September 1943 in accordance with NKO Order Number 285.

===== Subordinate units =====
- 339th Rifle Regiment
- 347th Rifle Regiment
- 351st Rifle Regiment
- 1011th Artillery Regiment
- 430th Antitank Battalion
- 699th Sapper Battalion
- 899th Signal Battalion
- Training Battalion

==== 120th Guards Rifle Division ====
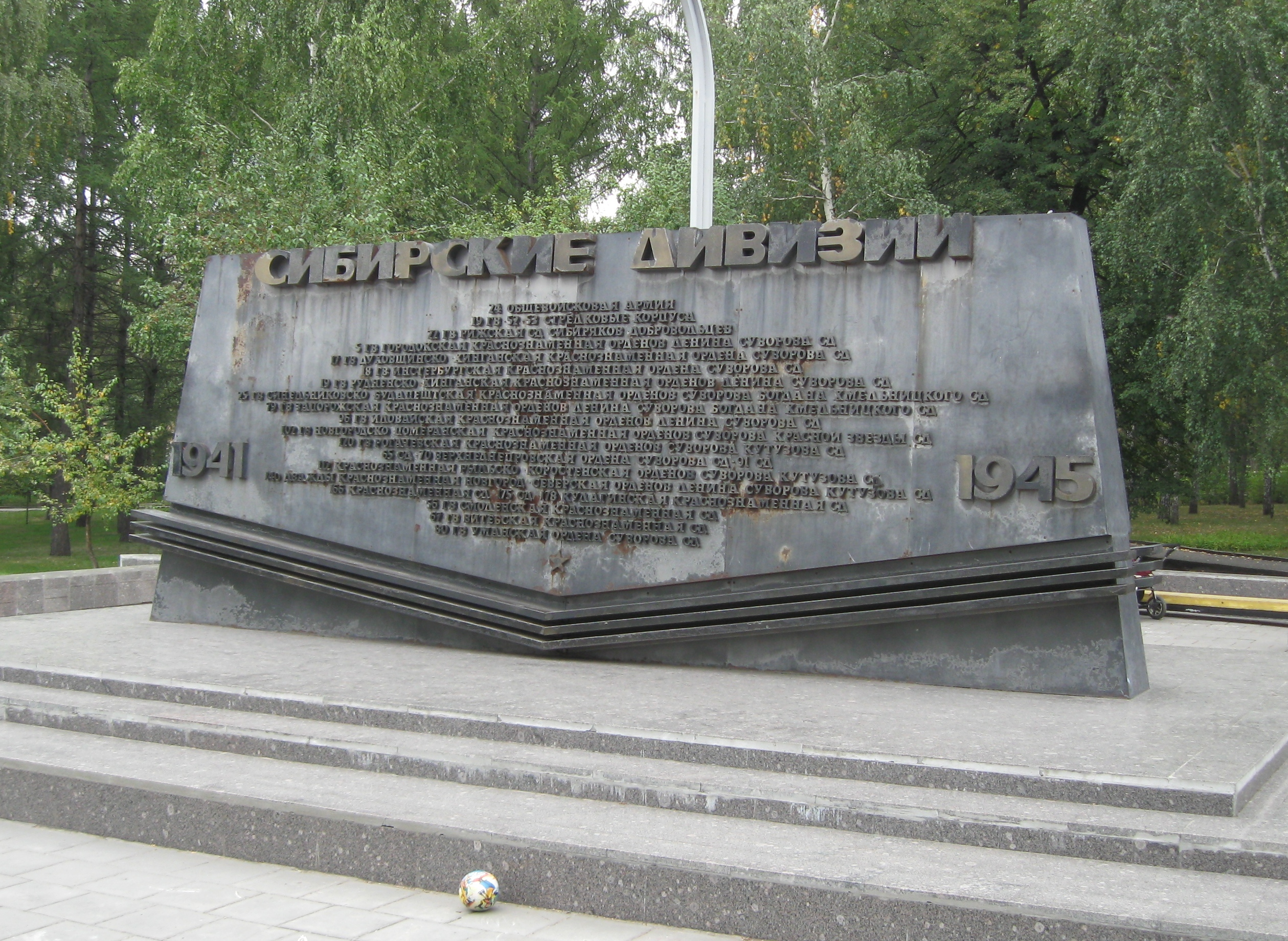
Monument of Glory in Novosibirsk to the Siberian Divisions, including 120th Guards Rogachev Rifle Division

In mid-July 1944 the divisional commander, Major General Ia. Ia. Fogel, was killed in action. The 120th Guards was frequently assigned to the 41st Rifle Corps, 3rd Army, during the war.

In 1944 and 1945 the division participated in the Rogachev-Zhlobin, Belarusian, East Prussian and the Berlin offensive operations. For services in battle the division was awarded the honorary title "Rogachev" (February 1944), was awarded the Order of the Red Banner, Suvorov 2nd Class and Kutuzov 2nd class, over 18 thousand of its soldiers awarded orders and medals, eight were awarded the title Hero of the Soviet Union.

== After the war ==
Postwar, the 120th Guards Rifle Division was relocated to Uruchcha in Minsk, and was converted into the 120th Guards Motor Rifle Division on 20 May 1957.

In 1963 the 336th Guards Motorized Rifle Regiment of the division was reorganized as the 336th Separate Guards Bialystok Naval Infantry Regiment in the Baltic Fleet, and relocated to the city Baltiysk, becoming the first regiment of Naval Infantry in the resurgent Soviet Navy. It is now in Baltiysk, the 336th Guards Naval Infantry Brigade.

The division was the first formation in the Soviet Union to test prototypes of the new BMP-1 ("objekt 765") infantry fighting vehicle in January–November 1965, under the command of Guards Major Vasiliy Samodelov.

On 31 October 1967, the division received the honorific "named for the Supreme Soviet of the Byelorussian SSR".

On 1 June 1982 the division was reorganised as the 5th Guards Independent Army Corps with a 2:2 mix of tank and motor rifle brigades and regiments. Major General Alexsandr Chumakov took command. On 1 June 1989 the corps was disbanded and the division reformed, with three motor rifle regiments and one tank regiment.

The division had its headquarters at Uruchche, and included the 335th Guards Tank Regiment, the 334th Guards and 339th Guards MRRs, the 356th MRR, the 310th Guards Self-Propelled Artillery Regiment, and the 1045th Guards Anti-Aircraft Rocket Regiment. After the fall of the Soviet Union, it became part of the Belarus Ground Forces. It is now stationed at Uruchcha, one of the microraions of Minsk. The 334th Regiment was reassigned to the Internal Troops of Belarus.

On 1 February 2002, at the end of the reform of the Belarusian Ground Forces, the division was reorganized into the 120th Guards Mechanised Brigade.

== Commanders ==
- Major General Nikolay Kuzmich Maslennikov (29 September–15 November 1943)
- Colonel Yan Yanovich Fogel (16 November 1943–died of wounds 14 July 1944; major general from 3 June 1944)
- Colonel Pyotr Sergeyevich Telkov (15 July–21 September 1944)
- Major General Nikolay Aleksandrovich Nikitin (22 September–25 December 1944)
- Colonel Pyotr Sergeyevich Telkov (26 December 1944–October 1947; major general 20 April 1945)
- Major General Pavel Grigoryevich Arabey (October 1947–January 1951)
- Colonel Lev Illarionovich Puzanov (12 October 1954–5 November 1956)
- Major General Mikhail Zaitsev (January 1967–12 November 1968)
- Major General Aleksandr Petrovich Chumakov (August 1980–June 1986)
