= Andrei Ravkov =

Belarusian general

Lieutenant General Andrei Ravkov
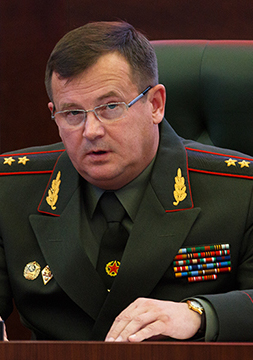
- Ravkov in 2015

Ambassador of Belarus to Azerbaijan
- In office 16 February 2021 – 14 January 2025
- President: Alexander Lukashenko
- Prime Minister: Roman Golovchenko; Alexander Turchin
- Preceded by: Sergei Aleinik
- Succeeded by: Dmitry Pinevich

State Secretary of the Security Council of Belarus
- In office 20 January 2020 – 3 September 2020
- President: Alexander Lukashenko
- Prime Minister: Syarhey Rumas
- Preceded by: Stanislav Zas
- Succeeded by: Valery Vakulchik

Minister of Defence of Belarus
- In office 27 November 2014 – 20 January 2020
- President: Alexander Lukashenko
- Prime Minister: Andrei Kobyakov; Syarhey Rumas
- Preceded by: Yury Zhadobin
- Succeeded by: Viktor Khrenin

Personal details
- Born: 25 June 1967 (age 59) Revyaki, Vitebsk Region, Byelorussian Soviet Socialist Republic, Soviet Union
- Spouse: Natalia Ravkova
- Education: Minsk Suvorov Military School; Moscow Higher Military Command School; Military Academy of Belarus; Military Academy of the General Staff of the Armed Forces of Russia

Military service
- Branch/service: Armed Forces of Belarus
- Years of service: 1984–Present
- Rank: Lieutenant General

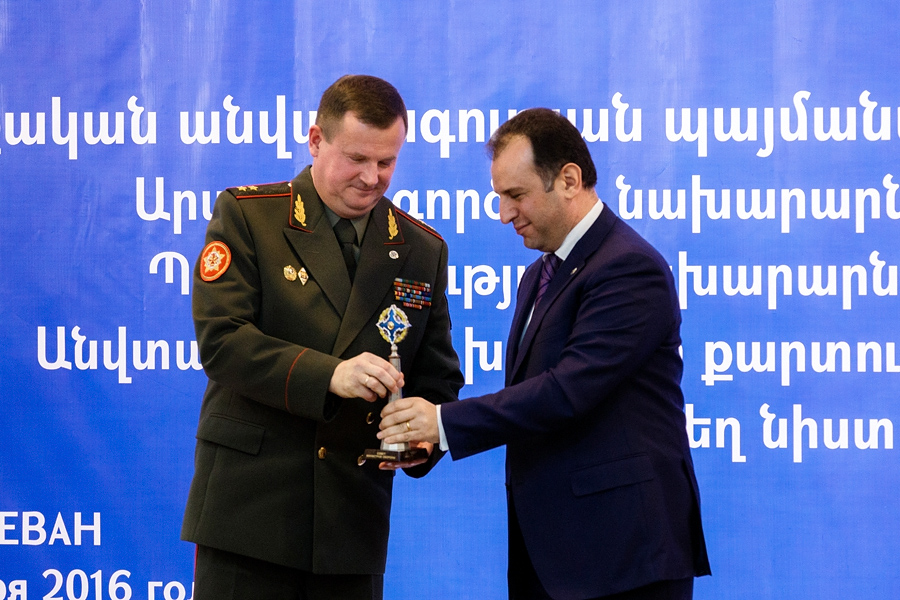
Ravkov with Armenian Defense Minister Vigen Sargsyan.

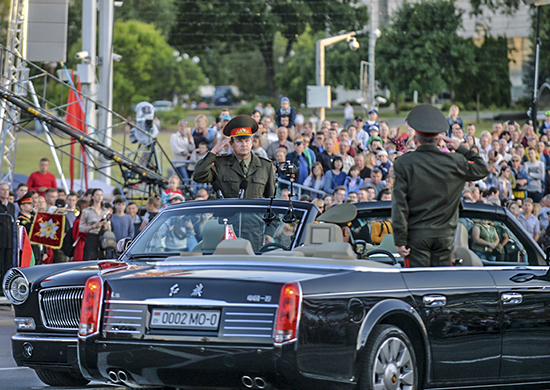
Ravkov (left) in the Hongqi L5 during the 2019 Minsk Independence Day Parade.

Lieutenant General Andrei Alyakseyevich Ravkov (Belarusian: Андрэй Аляксеевіч Раўкоў, born on 25 June 1967 in Revyaki, Vitebsk Region) is a Belarusian General and military leader who served as Minister of Defence from 2014 to 2020 and as the State Secretary of the Security Council of Belarus in 2020. He was also the Ambassador to Azerbaijan.

== Early life and career ==
In 1984, he graduated from Minsk Suvorov Military School. In 1988, he graduated with honors from the Moscow Higher Military Command School. He worked his way from the commander of the platoon to commander of the battalion. In 1999, he graduated with a gold medal from the Command and Staff Department of the Military Academy of Belarus. In 2005, he graduated with honours from the Military Academy of the General Staff of the Armed Forces of the Russian Federation and was appointed commander of the 103rd Separate Guards Mobile Brigade. From 2006 to 2012 he served as Chief of the Operations Department and concurrently as Deputy Chief of Staff of the Western Operational Command. On 16 November 2012, he became Commander of the North Western Operational Command. That year, he was elected to the Minsk Regional Council of Deputies from Borisov. By order of President Alexander Lukashenko on 24 November 2014, he was appointed to the post of Minister of Defence.

== Minister of Defense (2014-2020) ==
In the run-up to the 2015 Minsk Victory Day Parade, Ravkov ordered the changing of the open top inspection vehicle used on Victors Avenue from the traditional ZIL-41044 to the Hongqi L5, which is an official state car in China. In 2017, after the death of a conscript soldier Alexander Korzhich due to repeated hazing, he reaffirmed his support in the conscription system while conceding that it needed changes due to the lack of recruits. In late September 2017, Ravkov presided over the Zapad 2017 exercise with Russia. He announced in November 2018 that the national defence plan for 2019 will be adjusted to come in line with the most recent military doctrine.

In June 2019, he announced the entry of a bill in the House of Representatives, the largest of its provisions being a mechanism that institutes mandatory military service. In the substantiation of the law's draft, authored by Ravkov, the need to for this is justified by the fact that the chairmen of local executive authorities and their deputies head their own territorial defense zones. On 28 June 2019, the House of Representatives passed this bill in second reading. After the law enters into force, eligible graduates of higher educational institutions such as Belarusian State University are required to engage in military service immediately and will not be able to continue their postgraduate studies.

== Security Council Secretary (2020) ==
He was dismissed in January 2020, succeeding Stanislav Zas as Secretary of the Security Council of Belarus. He was dismissed on 3 September 2020, being succeeded by the Chairman of the KGB, Valery Vakulchik.

=== International sanctions ===
In August 2020, Ravkov was put under sanctions by Estonia, Latvia and Lithuania over his role in suppressing the 2020 Belarusian protests. On 6 November 2020, he was sanctioned by the European Union, the United Kingdom, and Canada. On 24 November, Iceland, Liechtenstein, Norway, North Macedonia, Montenegro and Albania aligned themselves with the November EU sanctions against 15 Belarusian individuals, while Switzerland did the same on 11 December.

== Post-military (2020-present) ==
On 19 November 2020, he was appointed as the Ambassador to Azerbaijan. On 16 February 2021, he presented his credentials to President Ilham Aliyev. He was succeeded by Dmitry Pinevich on 14 January 2025, after almost four years in the position.

== Dates of rank ==
Promotions
Insignia	Rank	Date
	Colonel	2004
	Major General	2011
	Lieutenant General	2015

== See also ==
- Security Council of Belarus
