= Leonty Gurtyev =

Soviet military officer

Leontii Gurtev
- Gurtyev at the Military Academy
- Born: Leonty Nikolayevich Gurtyev; 1 July 1891; Shamakhi, Russian Empire
- Died: 8 August 1943 (aged 52); Kalinovka, Oryol Oblast, USSR
- Burial place: Kalinovka, Khomutovsky District, Kursk Oblast, Russia
- Military career
- Allegiance: Russian Empire (1915–1918); Soviet Union (1919–1943)
- Branch: Army
- Service years: 1915–1943
- Rank: Major General
- Commands: 308th Rifle Division
- Conflicts: World War I Russian Civil War; World War II †
- Awards: Gold Star; Order of Lenin; Order of the Red Banner (2)

Leonty Nikolayevich Gurtyev (Russian: Леонтий Николаевич Гуртьев; 1 July 1891 – 3 August 1943) was a Soviet military officer, known for his participation in the Second World War's Eastern front and most notably in the battle of Stalingrad.

== Early life ==
Leonty Nikolayevich Gurtyev was born in the town of Shamakhi (now in Azerbaijan) in the family of a forester. In 1900, the family moved to the city of Panevėžys, in the Kovno area of modern-day Lithuania. After graduating from high school with honors, Gurtyev enrolled at the Kharkov Institute of Technology. In 1914 he was transferred to the St. Petersburg Polytechnic Institute, where he was arrested for participating in a workers' demonstration and spent three months imprisoned in the Peter and Paul Fortress.

After his release from prison he was drafted and sent to the reserve artillery division in the city of Luga, and then to the front near Warsaw, where Czarist Russia was fighting against Germany in World War I. In the fall of 1915, in a battle in the Volyn area, he was captured by Austro-Hungarian troops and remained a prisoner until November 1918. Held in captivity in Hungary, Gurtyev was liberated, along with the other prisoners, by revolutionaries during the 1919 uprising. On returning home he volunteered in the Red Army.

== Military officer ==
Gurtev fought in the Russian Civil War, taking part in the battle of Tsaritsyn, and rose through the Red Army officers' ranks. (Note: Antony Beevor quotes a description of Gurtyev as a "silent and reserved Siberian." Grossman (2005)) In 1929, he graduated from the Shot course. In 1939, he was appointed Assistant Head of the Infantry School of Omsk. In March 1942, Colonel Gurtyev was assigned the formation of a new military unit that was to become the 308th Rifle Division and in May assumed its command.

== Stalingrad ==
Gurtyev's Division crossed the Volga river during the night of the 30th of September 1942 and immediately engaged the enemy. They were ordered to defend the silicate plant just north of the Barikady factory. On 23 October fighting began inside the factory, with German tanks brought in and Luftwaffe aircraft bombing Soviet defences, while the attackers also used Nebelwerfer mortars for close-quarter bombing. The factory's workshops changed hands several times.

As was customary during the battle of Stalingrad, and during the Eastern Front fighting generally, the word "retreat" and its derivatives were not used in military communications from and to Gurtyev's division during its engagement with the enemy. (Note: "For the first time during the entire period of combat in the city, I had to order a part of the troops to retreat 200 to 300 meters toward the Volga. By this time the [Stalingrad] front was straightened out and the battle deployment made denser. In the order there was no mention of retreat but rather this was said: 'The divisions of Gurtyev will at 4:00 on October 19 occupy and defend the sectors of the streets Sormovskaya, Tupikovskaya'." Chuikov (1962))

Gurtyev's division dug in and held on in defense of the factory, while also conducting continuous counter-attacks.

Following the liberation of the city of Stalingrad, Gurtyev's division fought in the attacking operation that led to the encirclement of the German Sixth Army, the Third and Fourth Romanian armies, and portions of the German Fourth Panzer Army. On 7 December 1942, Gurtyev was promoted to the rank of Major General. On 4 May 1943, Gurtyev was awarded the Order of the Red Banner.

== Death ==
Gurtyev's division fought in the extended operations around Kursk, which lasted from July through August 1943. On the 8th of August, during the battle for the recapture of Orel, a shell exploded at the officers' observation post and Gurtyev, protecting with his body General Alexander Gorbatov, died immediately from the shrapnel.

== Honors ==
Gurtyev was honored post-humously with the Order of Lenin, as well as with the Order of the Red Banner for a second time. On 27 August 1943, the Soviet Presidium, citing the Major General's "exemplary performance in command assignments in battle with the German invaders and the heroism and courage displayed," awarded Gurtyev posthumously the medal of the Hero of the Soviet Union.

== Sources ==
=== Books ===
- Beevor, Antony (1999) [1998]. Stalingrad. London, UK: Penguin Books. ISBN 0-375-42407-5.
- Chuikov, Vasily (1965) [1962]. Battle for Stalingrad. New York, NY, USA: Ballantine Books.
- Grossmman, Vasily (2005) [1941-45]. Beevor, Antony; Vinogradova, Luba (eds.). A Writer At War. New York, NY, USA: Pantheon Books. ISBN 0-375-42407-5.

=== Papers ===
- Leites, Nathan (1986). Soviet Style in War (PDF). Crane Russak. ISBN 9780844814155.

=== Websites ===
- "Гуртьев Леонтий Николаевич" [Gurtiev Leonty Nikolaevich]. Victory 1945 (in Russian). 2012.
- "Улицы Волгограда, названные в честь боевых соединений, военначальников и героев Сталинградской битвы" [Streets of Volgograd named after military formations, military commanders and heroes of the Battle of Stalingrad]. Volgograd Information Center (in Russian).
- "Гуртьев Леонтий Николаевич" [Gurtev Leonty Nikolaevich]. War Heroes (in Russian).
