= Minsk Suvorov Military School =

Military academy in Minsk, Belarus

Coordinates: 53.9114°N 27.5586°E

- Мінскае Сувораўскае ваеннае вучылішча
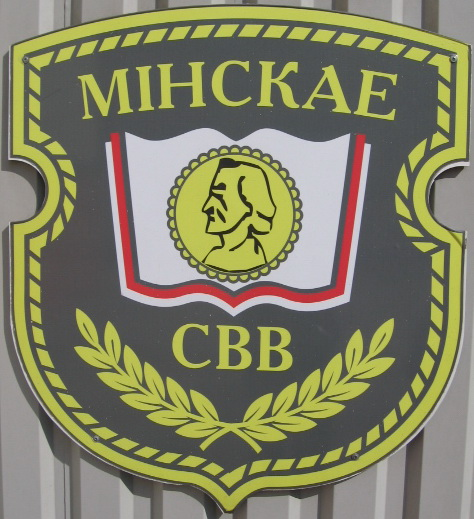
- The official emblem of the school.
- Other name: MnSVU
- Former name: United Belarusian Military School
- Type: military academy
- Established: 1953
- Affiliations: Armed Forces of Belarus
- Academic affiliations: Suvorov Military School
- Director: Major General Alexander Naumenko
- Location: Minsk, Minsk Region, Belarus
- Language: Russian, Belarusian

The Minsk Suvorov Military School (MnSVU) (Note: Belarusian: Мінскае Сувораўскае ваеннае вучылішча, romanized: Minskaye Suvorawskaye vayennaye vuchylishcha; Russian: Минское суворовское военное училище, romanized: Minskoye suvorovskoye voyennoye uchilishche) is one of the Suvorov Military Schools in Belarus and in other former Soviet Republics for military cadets. The MnSVU is a state specialised educational institution that focuses on military subjects and trains students for universities and further military or civil service. According to President Lukashenko, the school has made a "significant contribution to the patriotic education of the younger generation and the training of future Belarusian officer."

== History ==
In accordance with a resolution of the Council of Ministers of the USSR on 21 May 1952, the Suvorov Military School was opened in Minsk in 1953. In 1921, the Suvorov Military School building housed infantry courses for the United Belarusian Military School. The first set of cadets were assembled in September 1953. Most of the original pupils were orphaned children whose parents died in the Second World War. The day of the school is considered 6 November, which represents the day in 1953 when the school was presented with its first colours. During this ceremony, the school colour was presented by Colonel General Nikandr Chibisov on behalf of Defence Minister Bulganin. On its 60th anniversary in 2013, a film called "the Honor of anyone" as released for the school.

== Building Architecture ==
The current school building was built in 1953 by Zaborsky on the basis of the building of the former Minsk Theological Seminary. Sculptures at the building included an infantryman and a pilot, a worker and a collective farmer. These sculptures are the works of Andrei Zaspitsky together with Viktor Popov. The main entrance is decorated where the pediment stands out with a decorated relief, in the corners of which sculptural groups are placed decorated with white ornaments.

== Activities ==
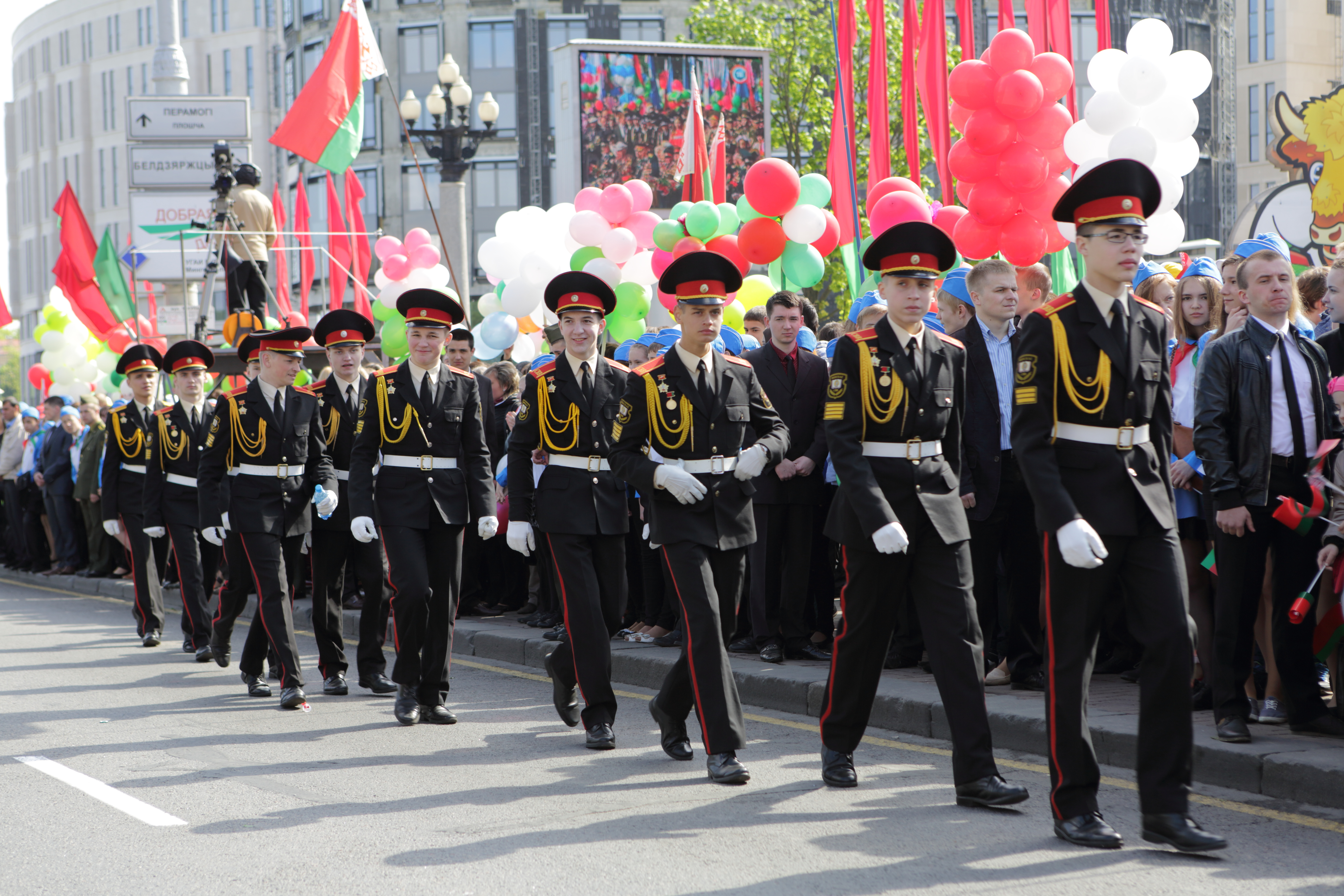
A cadets from the school during a Victory Day celebration in 2014.

Today, the school grants admission to students as young as 12 years old (from the sixth grade). In the 2007–2008 academic year, the entire course was made of 105 cadets, which is larger to its usual limit of 100 cadets. Around 12,000 graduates attended a training course in this elite institution. More than 50 alumni became generals, among them three Ministers of Defense. The training of the cadets includes not only the school curriculum and military training, but also etiquette and dance training. In connection with the transition to the eleven-year education system in 2009, two companies (two courses) were graduated at once. Now the term of study in school is five years. Like its counterpart at the Moscow Military Music College in Russia, the corps of drums of the school opens annual parades on a national scale (e.g. Minsk Independence Day Parade, Victory Day Parades). In 2018, the school took part in the planting of the Alley of Cosmonauts in the Botanical Garden of the National Academy of Sciences of Belarus.

=== Visitors ===
The Suvorov School has been visited by many state and prior to 1991, party leaders, as well as foreign and domestic military delegations. On 19 January 1958, Soviet Premier and First Secretary Nikita Khrushchev accompanied by Second Secretary Tikhon Kiselev visited the school. That December, General Andrei Grechko visited the school. In recent years, President Alexander Lukashenko has visited the school.

== Commandants of the School ==
The following is a list of commandants of the school since 1953:

- Major General Dmitry Malkov (1953–1954)
- Major General Andrei Kryuchkov (1954–1956)
- Major General Peter Saenko (1956–1969)
- Major General Fyodor Rudskoy (1969–1982)
- Lieutenant General Lev Zaytsev (1982–1989)
- Major General Vitaly Stepanov (1989–2002)
- Major General Sergey Bagdasarov (2002–2005)
- Major General Nikolai Skobelev (2005–2010)
- Major General Viktor Lisowski (2010–2016)
- Major General Alexander Naumenko (2016–present)

== Notable alumni ==
- Colonel General Sergey Kizyun – Chief of Staff/1st Deputy Commander of the Leningrad Military District
- Lieutenant General Andrei Ravkov – Former State Secretary of the Security Council of Belarus
- Major General Viktor Khrenin – Incumbent Minister of Defense
- Colonel General Peter Chaus – First Minister of Defense of Belarus
- Major General Vladimir Shapovalov – Honored Doctor of Russia
- Colonel General Leonid Maltsev – Former Defense Minister and State Secretary of the Security Council of Belarus
- Siarhei Levin – Businessman and Managing Director of Lebortovo Capital Partners
- Dmitry Mazepin – Chairman of Uralchem Integrated Chemicals Company
- Vadim Prokopiev – Commander of the Pahonia Regiment

== Photos ==
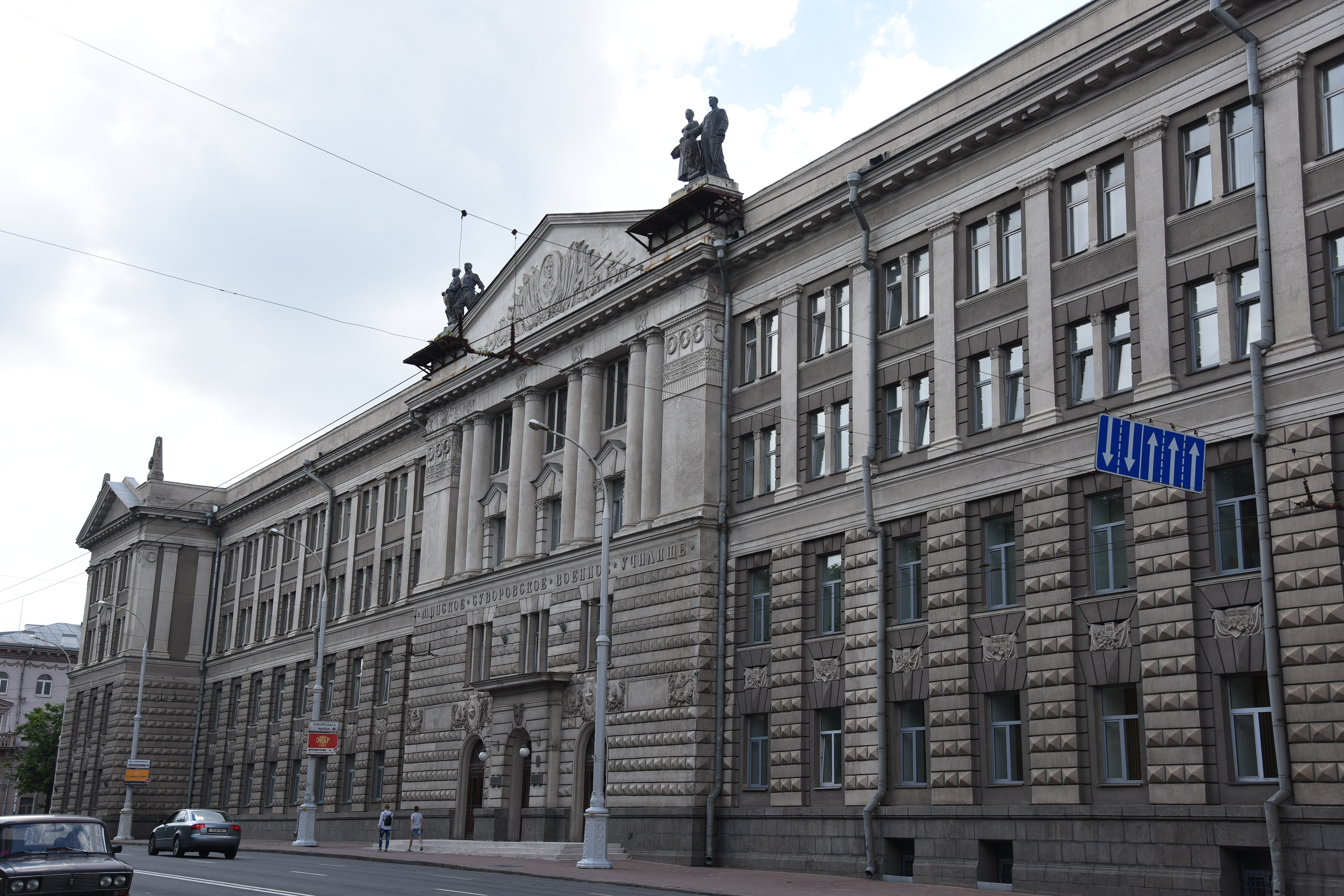
School Building

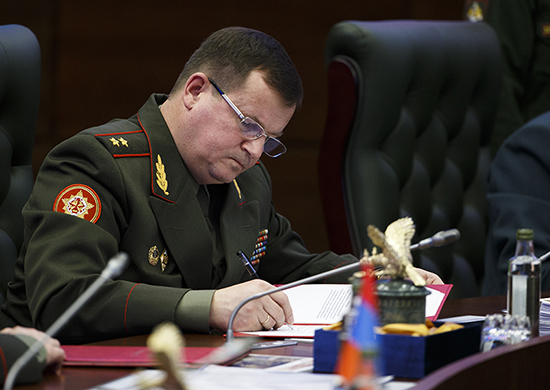
Andrei Ravkov graduated the suvorov Military School in 1984.

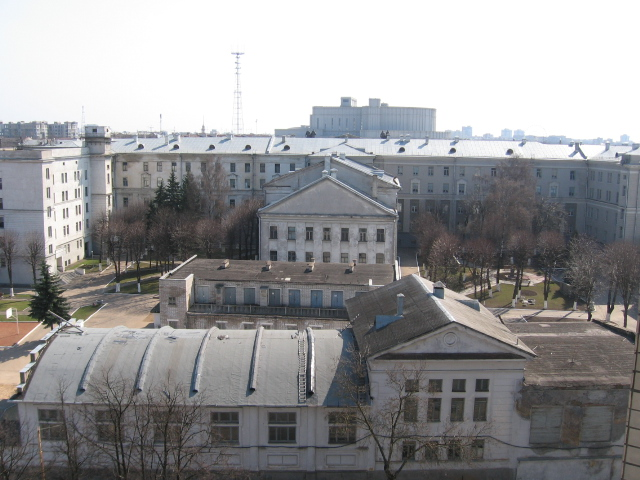

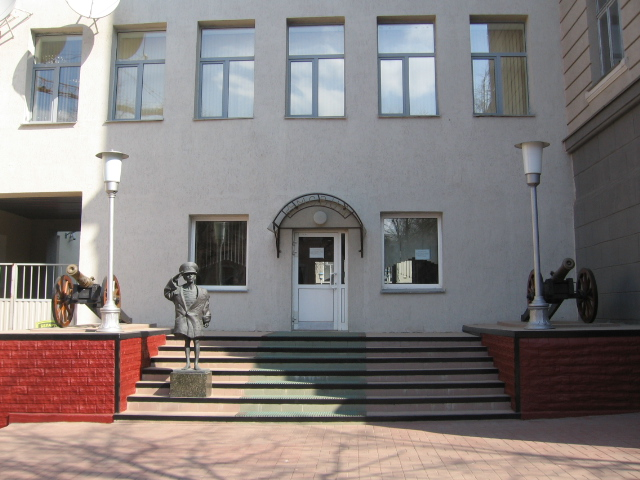

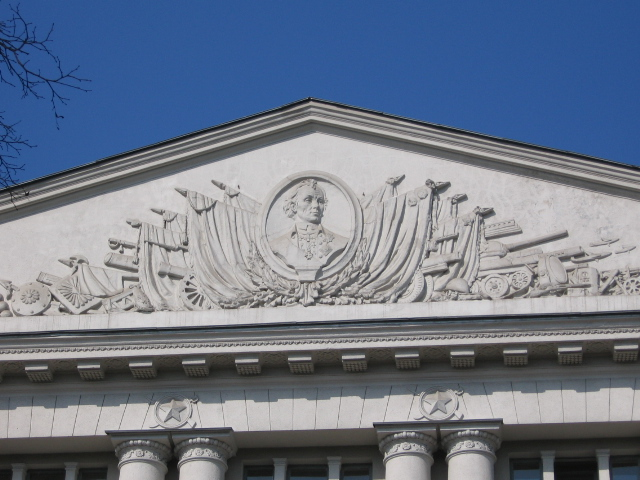

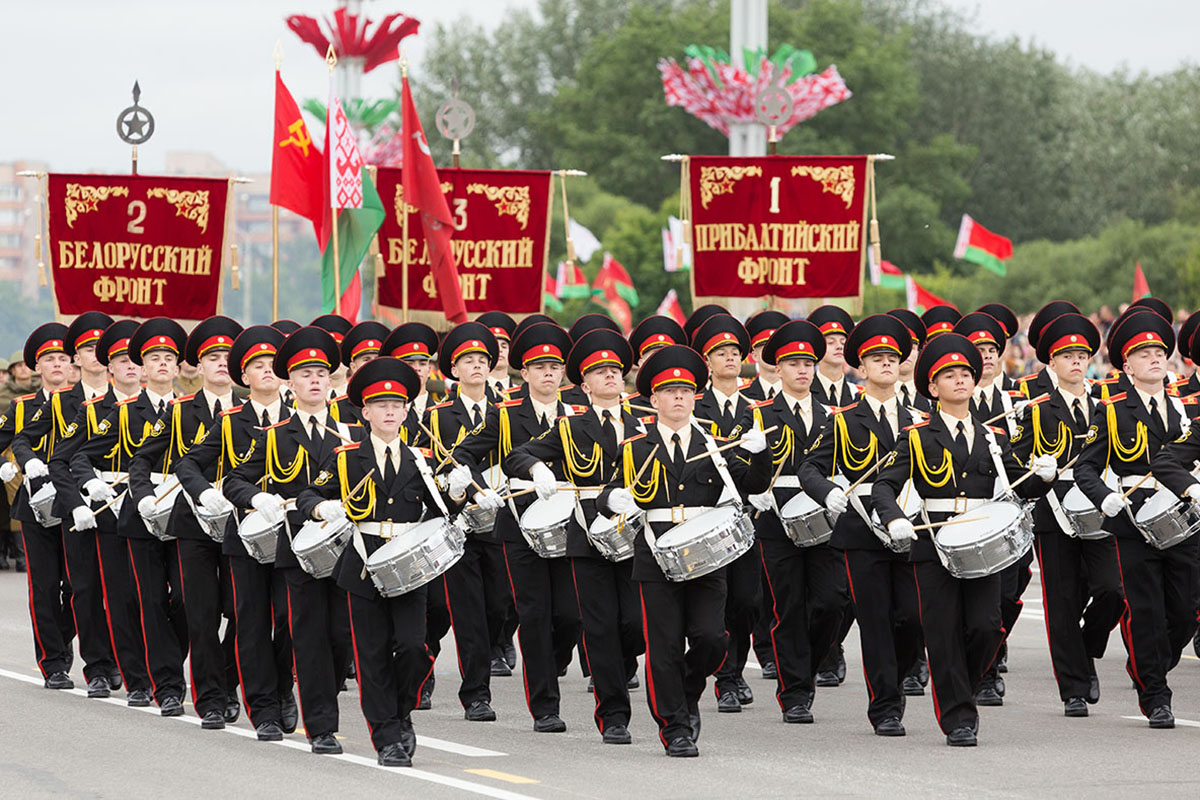
The drummers of the school during the 2017 Minsk Independence Day Parade.
