= Pavel Pavlovich Kozlovsky =

Pavel Kozlovsky
- Павел Козловский
- Born: Pavel Pavlovich Kozlovsky; 9 March 1942 (age 84); Volkovnya, Brest Oblast, Byelorussian SSR, (now Belarus)
- Military career
- Allegiance: Soviet Union (1961–1991); Belarus (1991–1994)
- Branch: Soviet Army; Belarusian Army
- Service years: 1961–1991; 1991–1994
- Rank: Lieutenant General
- Other work: Minister of Defence of Belarus (1992–1994)

Pavel Pavlovich Kozlovsky (Belarusian: Павел Паўлавіч Казлоўскі, Russian: Павел Павлович Козловский), also translated as Paul Kozlowski, is a retired Soviet and Belarusian military leader and independent politician. A colonel-general in the Army of Belarus following the dissolution of the Soviet Union in December 1991, he was appointed the second Minister of Defence after the dissolution of the Soviet Union, serving from 1992 to 1994. In this role he was succeeded by Anatoly Kostenko. He unsuccessfully sought to challenge the incumbent President of Belarus Alexander Lukashenko in a campaign for the presidency in 2001, but failed to gather the sufficient number of signatures to stand in the election.

== Early career ==
He was born on 9 March 1942 in the village of Volkovnya into a peasant family. His father was a Red Army soldier who was killed in 1945 during the Second World War. After graduating high school in 1961, Kozlovsky entered the Tashkent Higher All-Arms Command School, which he graduated in 1965. He served in the following positions: company commander, regimental chief of staff, regimental commander, an divisional commander. During his Soviet Army service, he was stationed in the Transcaucasian Military District, specifically serving in the Georgian SSR and the Armenian SSR. He later graduated from the Frunze Military Academy and the General Staff Academy. In 1987, he was sent to the Belarusian Military District, holding the position of deputy commander. In March 1989, he was appointed commander of the 28th Combined Arms Army, before returning in July 1991 to Minsk to serve as Chief of Staff of the Belarusian Military District. At this point, he received the ranks of Major and Lieutenant colonel ahead of schedule. His last military rank in the Soviet Armed Forces was Lieutenant general.

== Post-independence military service ==
On April 22, 1992, he was approved as the Minister of Defense of Belarus. During his tenure, he distinguished himself by firing officers from the army who were members of the Belarusian Military Association. Many consider him to be the founder of the modern Belarusian army, which previously inherited Soviet era technologies and traditions. On 8 September 1992, he presided over the first oath taking ceremony that held on Independence Square, held on the 478th anniversary of the Lithuanian-Polish victory at the Battle of Orsha, which was established as a Day of Belarusian Military Glory. Under his control, disarmament of the army, causing Belarus to become the first nuclear-free state in the post-Soviet space. At the end of July 1994, after Alexander Lukashenko came to power, Kozlovsky resigned along with the entire government of Vyacheslav Kebich. On September 5 of the same year, by presidential decree, he was demoted to lieutenant general for abuse of office (which was not established by the investigation).

== Later life ==
Later, Kozlovsky began to focus on social and political activities, creating the International Fund for the Rehabilitation of the Health of Former Servicemen. From 1995–2001, he was a member of the United Civil Party, now he is non-partisan. He often criticizes the military policy of the Belarusian government, often saying that the "prestige of the army within our society has dropped". He tried to register his candidacy for the 2001 presidential election, but only collected 85,000 signatures out of 100,000 required. He then supported the candidacy of Vladimir Goncharik. In the 2010 elections, he was a confidant of presidential candidate Andrei Sannikov. In 2020, he criticized the government for holding the 2020 Minsk Victory Day Parade on Victors Avenue in the middle of the COVID-19 pandemic in Belarus, saying in an interview to Radio Svaboda that "There would have been no coronavirus parade during my time as minister" as well as "This action (parade) can be easily postponed to July 3 - to unite independence and victory".

== Family ==
His wife Natalya Grigorievna is an economist. They have three children: Elena, Andrey, and Pavel. He also has four grandchildren. He was the youngest of five children, with his brothers and sisters currently working in Belarus. His mother died in 1977.
