= Byelorussian Military District =

Byelorussian Military District (BVO)
- Russian: Белорусский военный округ (БВО)
- The territory of the Byelorussian Military District in 1991.
- Active: 28 November 1918 – 6 May 1992
- Country: Russian SFSR (1918–1920); Byelorussian SSR (1920–1991); Soviet Union (1922–1991); Belarus (1991–1992)
- Type: Military district
- Headquarters: Minsk
- Engagements: World War II
- Decorations: Order of the Red Banner

Commanders
- Notable commanders: Aleksandr Petrovich Chumakov; Anatoly Kostenko; Semyon Timoshenko

The Byelorussian Military District (Russian: Белорусский военный округ, romanized: Belorusskiy Voyenyi Okrug; alternatively Belarusian; Belarusian: Беларуская ваенная акруга, romanized: Belaruskaya vayennaya akruha) was a military district of the Soviet Armed Forces. Originally formed just before World War I as the Minsk Military District out of the remnants of the Vilno Military District and the Warsaw Military District, it was headed by the Russian General Eugen Alexander Ernst Rausch von Traubenberg.

With the outbreak of the Russian Civil War it was reorganized into the Western Front and in April 1924 it was renamed to the Western Military District. In October 1926 it was redesignated the Belorussian Military District, with its staff in Smolensk. And in July 1940 it was renamed the Western Special Military District. It covered the territory of the Byelorussian SSR and the western part of the RSFSR (including Smolensk area, Bryansk area, and parts of Kaluga area).

== History ==
In 1928, the first maneuvers of troops of the district were held, which was attended by 6th Cavalry Division and 7th Cavalry Division, 5th, 8th and 27th Rifle Divisions, 33rd territorial division, a tank brigade of the Moscow Military District, artillery, aviation, communication, and engineering units. The People's Commissar for Military and Naval Affairs, Kliment Voroshilov, attended the exercises. The exercises showed growth in the combat skills of troops.

In 1932 it deployed from within the country the 4th Leningrad Cavalry Order of the Red Banner Voroshilov Division commanded by Georgy Zhukov. In 1932–1933, in connection with the development of armored vehicles, it formed seven separate tank brigades, armed with Soviet-made tanks: light T-24, T-26, medium T-28, fast BT-2, BT-5, floating T-37, heavy T-35, T-27 tankettes. In 1937 the district deployed 15 infantry divisions, grouped into five infantry corps and five cavalry divisions.

On 26 July 1938, the district was renamed the Belorussian Special Military District (abbreviated as BOVO). After the Soviet/German invasion of Poland in September 1939, it took in most of the former Polish area and was redesignated the Belorussian Special Military District. In July 1940, it was redesignated the Western Special Military District. When the German invasion, Operation Barbarossa, began on 22 June 1941 the district was again redesignated the Western Front.

The district was reformed in October 1943 from the staff of the Moscow Zone of Defence (at Smolensk, which moved to Minsk in August 1944). From December 1944 until July 1945, the district was designated Byelorussian-Lithuanian Military District (covering the territory of Belarus and Lithuania), and from 9 July until 26 January 1946 it was divided in two districts – Minsk Military District (from the staff of the 3rd Army), and Baranovichi Military District (from the staff of 3rd Belorussian Front with its headquarters staff at Bobruisk). The district covered the territory of the Byelorussian SSR. On 4 February 1946, the Baranovichi and Minsk military districts are merged again into one district : the Belorussian Military District.

From mid February 1949, in accordance with a directive issued 10 January 1949, the 1st Air Army, present within the district, was redesignated the 26th Air Army. The 26th Air Army was subordinate to the BVO. In 1962 the 26th Air Army comprised the 95th Fighter Aviation Division (Shchuchin, Grodno Oblast), the 1st Guards Fighter-Bomber Aviation Division (Lida, Grodno Oblast), and three separate smaller units: the 10th independent Reconnaissance Aviation Regiment (Shchuchin, Grodno Oblast), the 248th independent Mixed Aviation Squadron (Minsk-Lipki, Minsk Oblast), and the 95th independent Mixed Aviation Squadron (Grodno, Grodno Oblast). In April 1980 the 26th Air Army was renamed the VVS Belorussian Military District. In May 1988 it was renamed again as the 26th Air Army. The 95th Fighter Aviation Division was disbanded in 1988.

The 26th Air Army included in 1990:

- 1st Guards Bomber Aviation Division (Lida, Grodno Oblast)
- 50th independent Mixed Aviation Regiment (Minsk, Minsk Oblast)
- 151st independent Aviation Regiment for Electronic Warfare (Shchuchin, Grodno Oblast)
- 927th Fighter Aviation Regiment (Bereza, Brest Oblast)
- 206th independent Assault Aviation Regiment (Pruzhany, Brest Oblast)
- 378th independent Assault Aviation Regiment (Postavy, Vitebsk Oblast)
- 397th independent Assault Aviation Regiment (Kobrin, Brest Oblast)
- 10th independent Reconnaissance Aviation Regiment (Shchuchin, Grodno Oblast)
- 302nd independent Helicopter Squadron for Electronic Warfare (Kobrin, Brest Oblast)
- 56th independent Communications Regiment (Minsk, Minsk Oblast)

From the beginning of the 1950s three armies were subordinated to the district: 28th Army, 5th Guards Tank Army and 7th Tank Army, totaling nine tank and two motor-rifle divisions, including training formations. 70th Guards Mechanised Division at Postavy became 45th Guards Tank Division in May 1957, but was disbanded in November 1959.

5th Guards Tank Army in 1988 had 8th Guards, 29th, and 193rd Tank Divisions while 7th 'Red Star' Tank Army had 3rd Guards, 34th, and 37th Guards Tank Divisions. From the late 1970s the district was subordinate to the Commander-in-Chief of the Western Strategic Direction. On the dissolution of the Soviet Union the 28th Army, headquartered at Grodno, included the 6th Guards Tank Division (Grodno), 28th Tank Division (Slonim), 50th Guards Motor Rifle Division (Brest), and the 76th Tank Division (a cadre formation which became a territorial training centre and then a weapons and equipment storage base), also at Brest. The 120th 'Rogachev' Guards Motorised Rifle Division, subordinated directly to district control, was the district's most prestigious division. Also present was the 51st Guards Artillery Division, two cadre artillery divisions, the 147th Anti-Aircraft Rocket Brigade at Bobruisk, intended for direct Front control, two surface-to-surface missile brigades, an independent SSM battalion, and a high-power artillery brigade.

The forces of the district became the basis of the Armed Forces of Belarus after the district was disbanded in May 1992 following the dissolution of the Soviet Union.

"The Byelorussian Military District is no more. Under a resolution of the Council of Ministers of Belarus all its units, as well as non-strategic formations, have been placed under the Defence Ministry of Belarus."

- Moscow RIA in English 1653 GMT 7 May 92

== Air Defence Forces in the District ==
2nd Air Defence Army traced its history back to 5 November 1941, when the 5th Air Defence Division was formed by the directive of Deputy People's Commissar of Defence of the USSR No. 3024 in Kuybyshev. The basis for the formation of the division were components of the Moscow Air Defence Corps, relocated to Kuybyshev. In September 1944, during the completion of Operation Bagration, the division, reorganized into the 14th Air Defence Corps, moved forward to Minsk to organize air defence of the territory liberated by the 3rd Belorussian Front. The corps defended airfields, railway junctions and the cities of Minsk, Borisov, Lida, Molodechno. In July 1944 the corps units, in cooperation with fighter aviation, shot down 19 enemy aircraft. The 907th Fighter Aviation Regiment (907 IAP), located at Loshitsa airfield particularly distinguished itself. The regiment was commanded by Hero of the Soviet Union, Lieutenant-Colonel N. Kozlov (later major-general of aviation, deputy commander of the 2nd independent Air Defence Army).

After the end of the Second World War, the corps was reorganized into the Belorussian Air Defence District (1951), then to the Minsk Air Defence Corps (1954). In 1960 the 2nd Independent Air Defence Army (Russian: 2-я отдельная армия ПВО) of the Soviet Air Defence Forces was established. In 1988 the Army comprised the 11th and 28th Air Defence Corps.

The 11th Air Defence Corps was formed on 15 March 1960 in Baranovichi, Minsk Oblast, from the PVO's 39th Fighter Aviation Division. 3rd Air Defence Division came under 2nd independent Army of the PVO from March 1960 to November 1977.

In 1988 it comprised:

- Headquarters, Baranovichi
- 61st Fighter Aviation Regiment PVO (Baranovichi, Minsk Oblast) (MiG-25/Su-27)
- 201st Fighter Aviation Regiment PVO (Machulischi, Minsk Oblast) (MiG-23)(taken over by Belarus in 1992, and disbanded in 1994)
- 15th Anti-Aircraft Missile Brigade (Fanipol)
- 115th Anti-Aircraft Missile Brigade (Brest)
- 127th Anti-Aircraft Missile Regiment (Lida)
- 377th Guards Anti-Aircraft Missile Regiment (Polotsk)
- 1146th Anti-Aircraft Missile Regiment (Orscha)
- 8th Radio-Technical Brigade (Baranovichi, Minsk Oblast)
- 49th Radio-Technical Regiment (Polotsk)
- an independent Electronic Warfare Battalion

It was taken over by Belarus in early 1992, and survived to at least 1994.

Over the border in the Ukrainian SSR, the 28th Air Defence Corps was also part of the 2nd Air Defence Army until 1992. In 1988 it comprised:

- Headquarters, Lvov
- 179th Fighter Aviation Regiment PVO (Stryy, Lvov Oblast) Converted to Mikoyan-Gurevich MiG-23M 1978; taken over by Ukrainian Air Defence Forces 1992; became 10th Aviation Base October 1994; disbanded December 1996.
- 894th Fighter Aviation Regiment PVO (Ozerne) (MiG-23ML/MLD) (Formed 9 June 1942; taken over by Ukraine 3.1.92.)
- 254th Anti-Aircraft Missile Regiment (Mukachevo, Zakarpatskaya Oblast)
- 540th Anti-Aircraft Missile Regiment (Kamenka-Bugskaya, Lvov Oblast)
- 270th Anti-Aircraft Missile Regiment (Lvov, Lvov Oblast)
- 312th Anti-Aircraft Missile Regiment (Nadvornaya, Ivan-Frankovsk Oblast)
- 438th Anti-Aircraft Missile Regiment (Kovel, Volynskaya Oblast)
- 521st Anti-Aircraft Missile Regiment (Borshschev, Ternopol Oblast)
- 1st Radio-Technical Brigade (Lipniki, Lvov Oblast)
- 10th Radio-Technical Regiment (Stryy, Lvov Oblast)
- 17th independent Electronic Warfare Battalion (Kolomyya, Ivan-Frankovsk Oblast)
- 38th Communications Center (Lvov, Lvov Oblast)

== Commanders (1924–91) ==
Members of the BVO military band performing the Anthem of the Byelorussian Soviet Socialist Republic in 1989.

- August Kork (April 1924 – February 1925)
- Mikhail Tukhachevsky (February 1925 – November 1925)
- August Kork (November 1925 – May 1927)
- Alexander Yegorov (May 1927 – April 1931)
- Ieronim Uborevich (April 1931 – June b1937)
- Ivan Belov (June 1937 – December 1937)
- Mikhail Kovalyov (April 1938 – July 1940)
- Colonel General Dmitry Pavlov (July 1940 – June 1941)
- Lieutenant General Vladimir Kurdyumov (June 1941 – August 1941)
- German occupation
- Lieutenant General Vsevolod Yakovlev (October 1943 – February 1945)
- Lieutenant General Trifon Shevaldin (February 1945 – July 1945)
- Lieutenant General Vladimir N. Razuvaev (July 1945 – February 1946)
- Marshal of the Soviet Union Semyon Timoshenko (February – March 1946)
- Colonel General Sergei Trofimenko (04.1946 – 03.1949) (former commander of the 7th Army)
- Marshal of the Soviet Union Semyon Timoshenko (03.1949 – 04.1960),
- Colonel General Vladimir Nikolayevich Komarov (04.1960 – 07.1961)
- Army General V. A. Penkovsky (07.1961 – 07.1964)
- Colonel General S. S. Maryakhin (07.1964 – 09.1967)
- Colonel General Ivan Tretyak (September 1967 – June 1976)
- Colonel General Mikhail Zaitsev (June 1976 – November 1980)
- Army General Yevgeni Ivanovski (December 1980 – February 1985)
- Colonel General Vladimir Shuralyov (February 1985 – January 1989)
- Colonel General Anatoly Kostenko (January 1989 – dissolution)

== Chiefs of Staff (1945–91) ==
- Alexander Barmin (July – September 1945)
- Alexander Pokrovsky (September 1945 – February 1946)
- Semyon Ivanov (March 1946 – November 1948)
- Pyotr Malyshev (November 1948 – March 1950)
- Nikanor Zakhvatayev (March 1950 – December 1951)
- Anatoly Gryzlov (April – July 1952)
- Alexander Pulk-Dmitriev (July 1952 – October 1954)
- Grigory Arico (October 1954 – March 1961)
- Alexander Shevchenko (March – December 1961)
- Nikolai Ogarkov (December 1961 – December 1965)
- Grigory Arico (2nd time) (December 1965 – March 1974)
- Vladimir Konchits (March 1974 – November 1977)
- Mikhail Tereshchenko (December 1977 – July 1979)
- Ivan Gashkov (July 1979 – December 1983)
- Vasily Sokolov (December 1983 – August 1988)
- Alexander Chumakov (August 1988 – ?)
