= Military history of Belarus =

The military history of Belarus encompasses an immense panorama of conflicts and struggles extending hundreds of years. This stage of military development is characterized by the emergence of new branches of the armed forces, updating the military doctrine, streamlining the military-industrial complex and ideological work, improving the system of command and staffing of troops, reforming most associations, formations, military units and institutions, as well as overcoming the crisis phenomena of the 1990s.

== Kievan Rus' ==
According to Western historiography, two Scandinavian dynasties ruled Rus': the Rurikids and the Rogvolodovichs. The former were based in Novgorod and Kyiv, while the latter reigned in the modern Belarusian city of Polotsk. Both dynasties competed with each other and waged armed struggle. The following military campaigns stand out during their conflict:

- 872 — Askold's campaign against the Polotsk people.
- 977 — Vladimir Svyatoslavich's campaign against Polotsk.
- 1021 — Bryachislav's attack on Novgorod, Bryachislav's defeat at Sudom.
- 1065 — Vseslav's attack on Pskov.
- 1066 — Vseslav's attack on Novgorod, capture and destruction of Novgorod.
- 1067 — Battle on the Nemiga.
- 1069 — Vseslav's attack on Novgorod.
- 1071 — Vseslav's defeat at Golotichsk.
- 1077, spring — Vseslav's campaign against Novgorod.
- 1077, summer — Vsevolod's campaign against Polotsk.
- 1077/78, winter — Svyatopolk Izyaslavich, Vladimir Monomakh, and the Polovtsians' campaign against Polotsk.
- 1078 and 1084 — Vseslav's campaign against Smolensk, Vladimir Monomakh's campaigns to Lukoml and Logoisk and to Drutsk.
- 1084 and 1086 — Vladimir Monomakh's campaign with the Polovtsians against Minsk.
- 1104 — Vladimir Monomakh's campaigns against Gleb Vseslavich of Minsk.
- 1116 — Gleb Vseslavich of Minsk's campaign against Slutsk.
- 1117 — Vladimir Monomakh's campaign against Gleb Vseslavich of Minsk.
- 1127 — Mstislav the Great's Polotsk campaign.

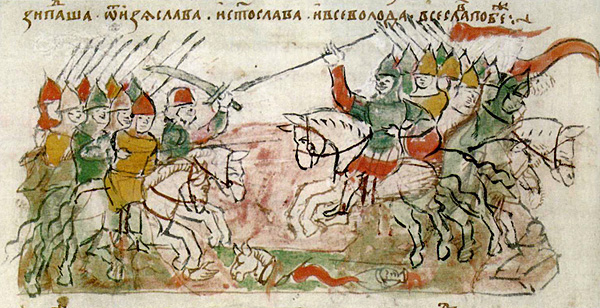
Battle on the Nemiga. Miniature from the Radziwill Chronicle

At the end of the 12th and beginning of the 13th centuries, against the backdrop of feudal fragmentation, the Belarusian lands became the object of aggression by the crusaders. During this period, the German knights from the Order of the Sword began to conquer the Baltics. Local tribes asked Polotsk for help. At that time, the power of the Principality of Polotsk extended to the lower reaches of the Western Dvina, and the Baltic tribes of the Livonians and Latgalians paid him tribute. There were also two fortresses here — Gertsike and Kukeynos, which belonged to Polotsk. The appearance of the German crusaders in the region began to threaten the loss of these lands. Therefore, in the summer of 1203, Prince Vladimir's troops besieged the German fortresses of Uexküll and Golm. That same year, Prince Vsevolod of Gercike marched on Riga. But these campaigns did not bring success to Polotsk. Vladimir's campaign against the crusaders together with the Livs was also unsuccessful in 1206, when the Polotsk people unsuccessfully besieged Golm for 11 days and were forced to retreat.

In 1208, the crusaders captured Kukeinos, and in 1209 they burned Eriska. The following year, an agreement was concluded between the Bishop Albert of Riga and Prince Vladimir, according to which Polotsk retained its right to receive tribute from the Livs. But the bishop was obliged to pay it. Two years later, new negotiations began. Vladimir demanded that the crusaders renounce the baptism of the Livs, threatening to burn all their castles. But he was unable to achieve his goal. In addition, the Lithuanians began to raid the Polotsk land, which significantly weakened the military forces of the Polotsk people. The negotiations ended with Vladimir being forced to give up the Lower Dvina, having only achieved free trade along the Western Dvina. But the struggle of the Polotsk people against the crusaders did not stop after this. In 1214, the Germans, having violated the agreement, again attacked Gertsike, but were defeated by the Lithuanians, called by Polotsk. The city with part of the principality still belonged to Polotsk for some time. In 1216, the Polotsk people, together with the Estonians and Lithuanians, prepared a new campaign against the crusaders. But on the eve of it, the Polotsk prince Vladimir suddenly died. There is an assumption that he was poisoned by German spies.

In addition to the crusaders, a threat also appeared from the Mongol-Tatars. In 1240-1242, Batu Khan's troops, led by Guyunk and Keidan, passed through the southern part of Belarus, plundering Mozyr, Turov, Pinsk, and Brest. In the middle and second half of the 13th century, they repeatedly carried out campaigns against Belarusian and Lithuanian lands. Invasions were repeated in 1275, 1277, 1287, 1315, 1325, and 1338.

== Late 15th — late 18th centuries ==
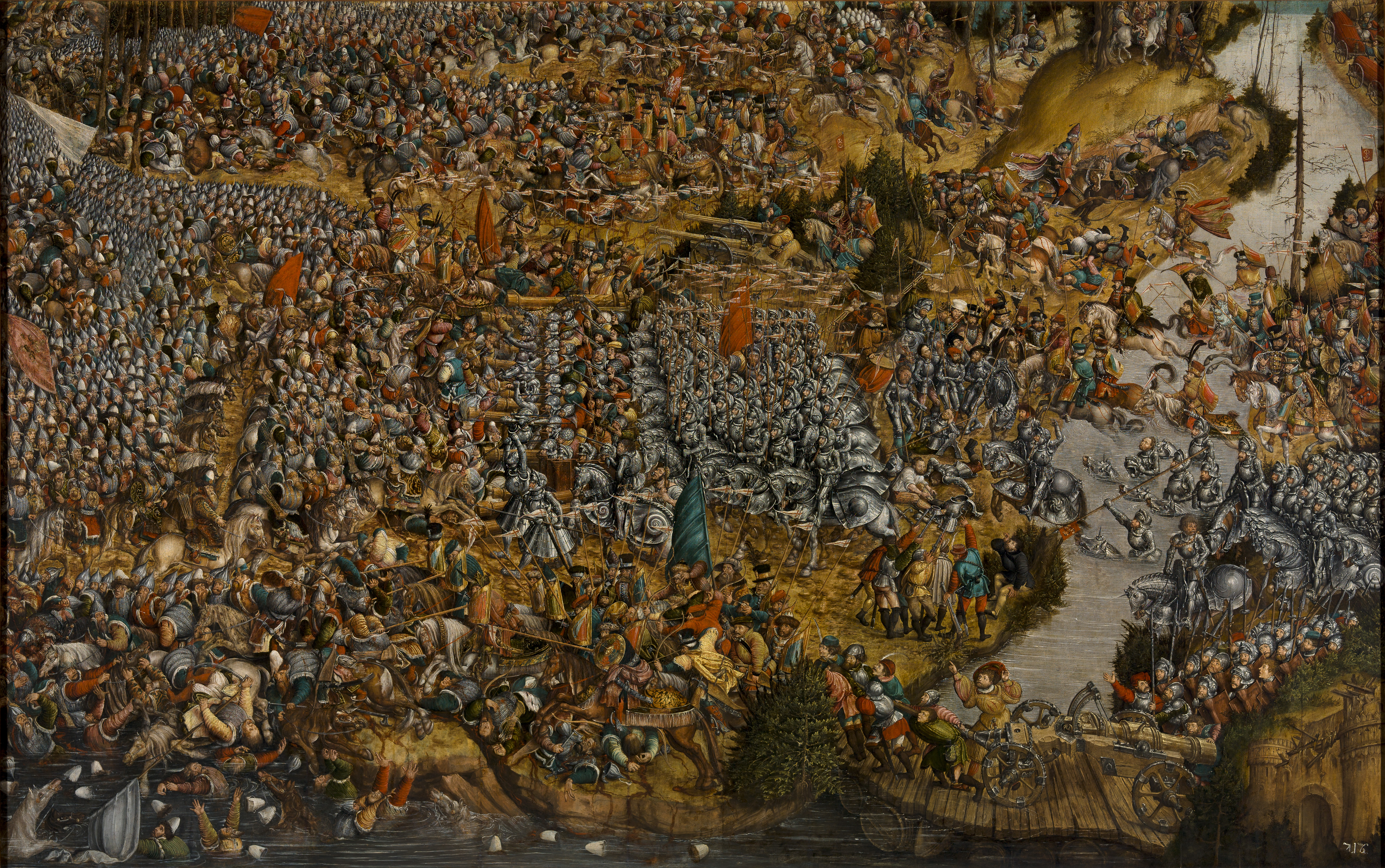
"Battle of Orsha", painting by an unknown author around 1524-1530

At the end of the 15th and beginning of the 16th centuries, wars with the Muscovite state resumed. Military clashes were provoked by Orthodox princes of the border lands of the Grand Duchy of Lithuania. The confrontation led to an undeclared border war of 1487-1494, as a result of which the entire Lithuanian border strip was broken. In 1500-1503, hostilities moved to eastern Belarus. The next major conflict began in 1512, during which the Lithuanians won a major victory near Orsha in 1514, although it did not lead to victory in the entire war.

Tatar raids on the Grand Duchy of Lithuania continued, but they were stopped. However, in the second half of the 15th century, the threat from the Crimean Khanate grew. From 1500 to 1569 alone, it carried out 45 raids on Belarusian lands. To protect against attacks on the southern borders of the Grand Duchy of Lithuania, Cossack barriers were created. Michael Glinski, who defeated the raiders near Klyetsk, distinguished himself in the fight against the Crimean raids. He would later raise an uprising that engulfed Mozyr, Drutsk, Turov, Krichev, Gomel and other Belarusian cities.

In the middle of the 16th century, the country entered the Livonian War. During the conflict, the most fierce struggle was for Polotsk. The difficult military situation forced the Grand Duchy of Lithuania to conclude the Union of Lublin with Poland, forming the Polish-Lithuanian Commonwealth. The struggle with Russia continued during the Time of Troubles and the Smolensk War. The most destructive events for the Belarusian lands were the events of 1654-1667, during which the Russians occupied almost all of Belarus. This was preceded by the Khmelnytsky Uprising, which engulfed Ukraine, central and southern Belarus. Both conflicts had devastating consequences, seriously affecting the economic development of the Belarusian lands. The war of 1654-1667 is called the most tragic in the history of the country by some Belarusian historians.

At the beginning of the 18th century, Belarus was affected by the Northern Wars. Russian and Swedish troops fought on the territory of the country. It was here, near the village of Lesnaya, that the Swedes suffered their first major defeat. Peter the Great would later call the battle at Lesnaya "the mother of the Poltava victory". This war exacerbated social contradictions in the Belarusian lands. The number of peasant and urban uprisings increased. The war and the accompanying plague reduced the population from 2,200 thousand people in 1700 to 1,500 thousand people in 1717.

In the second half of the century, the Belarusian lands were drawn into the struggle of noble confederations. One of these, Slutsk, arose in Belarus itself. In 1768, the War of the Bar Confederation began. On September 2 (13), 1769, the Battle of Orekhov took place in the Belarusian territories, in which the Russian detachment under the command of Brigadier Alexander Suvorov defeated the detachment under the command of Casimir Pulaski. As a result of the defeat of the confederates in 1772, the First Partition of the Polish-Lithuanian Commonwealth occurred.

In 1792, as a result of the Targowica Confederation, the Polish–Russian War of 1792 began, which also affected the Belarusian territories. In June of the same year, King Stanisław August Poniatowski joined the confederation and ordered an end to military action against the Russian troops. This war led to the Second Partition of the Polish-Lithuanian Commonwealth.

In 1794, the region was affected by the Kościuszko Uprising, which was suppressed by the Russian Empire and Prussia. The events led to the Third Partition of the Polish-Lithuanian Commonwealth and the disappearance of the state.

== Russian Empire ==
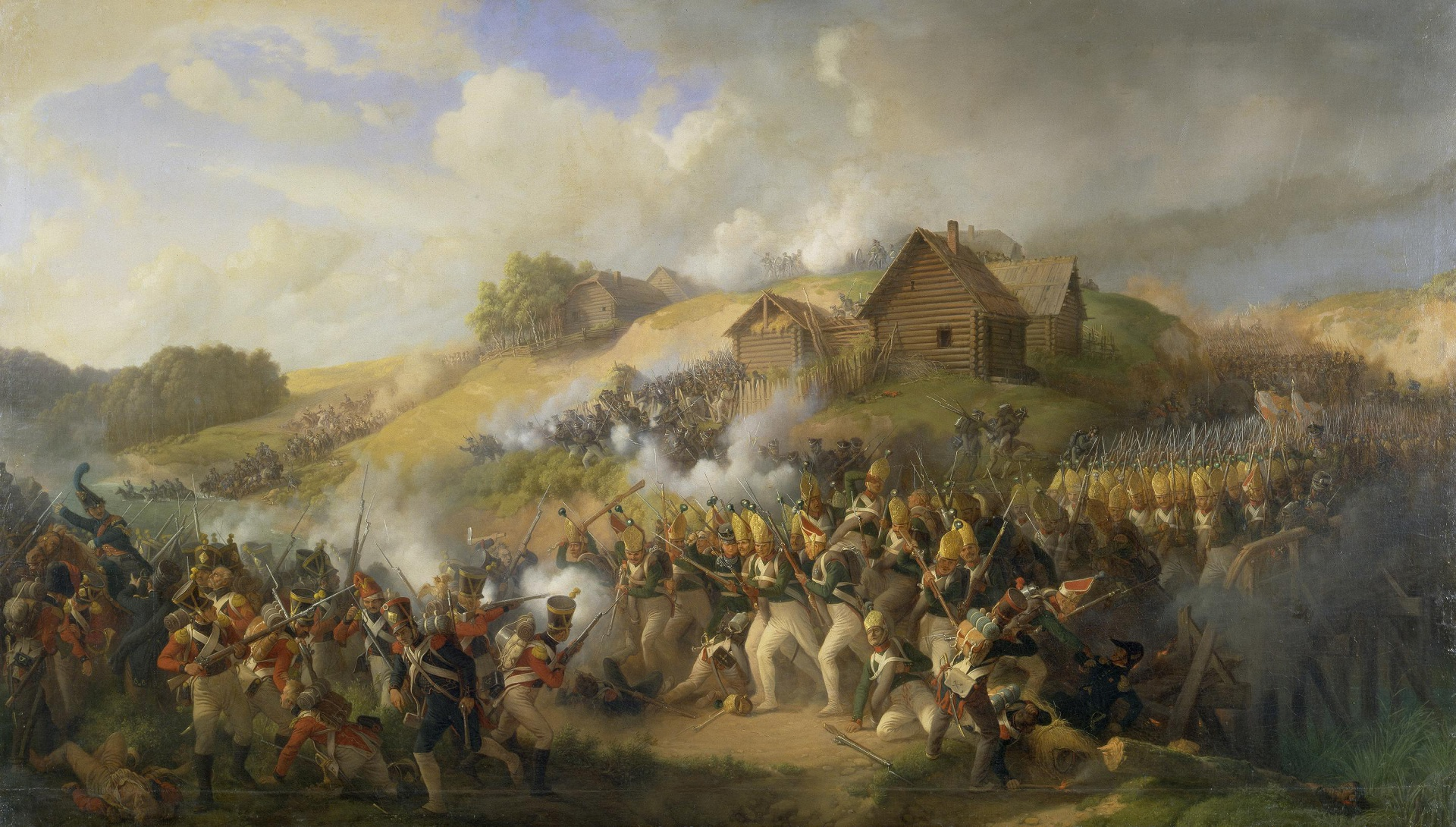
Peter von Hess. "The Battle of Klyastitsy".

In June 1812, Napoleon's army invaded the territory of modern Belarus. Russian troops managed to defeat the Grande Armée at Vitebsk, Mir, Kobrin, and Klyastsitsy. However, Napoleon continued to advance deep into the country. In July, his troops reached the Dnieper. The local Polish Catholic gentry, who sought to revive the Polish-Lithuanian Commonwealth and the Grand Duchy of Lithuania, went over to the French side. In October, the French army began to retreat from Russia. On October 7, the French left Polotsk, on October 26, Vitebsk, on November 4, Minsk, on November 9, Borisov, and on November 12, Mogilev. In November, near the village of Studenka, not far from Borisov, Napoleon's army was dealt a crushing blow by Russian troops. The Grand Army effectively ceased to exist.

In early April 1831, Lithuania and northwestern Belarus were engulfed in the events of the November Uprising. The rebels operated in the Ashmyany, Braslaw, Dzisna and Vileyka districts. Somewhat later, the uprising spread to the southern part of Belarus, namely the Rechitsa, Mozyr and Pinsk counties. The Vilnius Central Insurgent Committee was in charge of overseeing the uprisings in the Belarusian-Lithuanian lands. However, by the beginning of August, the tsarist army restored order in the region.

In 1863, Belarus was engulfed in the January Uprising. The rebellion was overseen by the Lithuanian Provincial Committee headed by Konstanty Kalinowski, subordinate to the Central National Committee in Warsaw. In January and February, the rebels were active only in the western regions. In the spring, their units appeared in the rest of Belarus. In May, the Imperial Russian Army restored order in the Minsk, Mogilev and Vitebsk provinces. Thus, the Grodno region became the main center of the uprising. However, even there the rebel activity gradually petered out, especially after the repressions of Mikhail Muravyov-Vilensky. The last rebel detachment was liquidated in the summer of 1864 in Novogrudok.

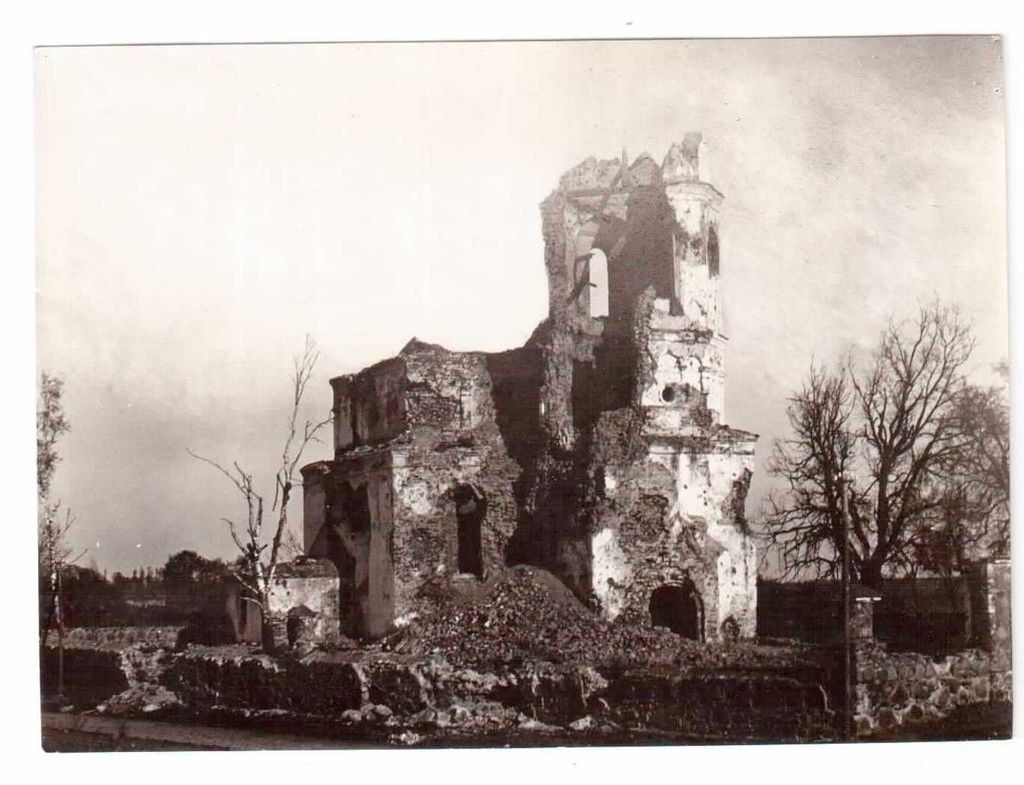
Ruins in Smorgon

In 1915, during the Great Retreat of the Imperial Russian Army, the Eastern Front of the World War I moved to the territory of Belarus. In August, the German offensive began in the direction of Kovno-Vilno-Minsk. After an unsuccessful attempt to take Vilnius, German troops launched a new offensive and on September 9 broke through the front in the vicinity of Sventsyany, penetrated the Russian rear, captured Vileika and approached Molodechno. Separate German units reached Smalyavichy and Borisov. The headquarters of the Russian Supreme Commander-in-Chief was transferred from Baranavichy to Mogilev. In mid-September, the Kaiser's forces were stopped. The Germans retreated to the area of the Naroch-Svir lakes. At the same time, stubborn battles for the city of Smorgon were fought for 810 days, which was completely destroyed and went down in history as a "dead city". Chemical weapons were used here repeatedly. In October 1915, the front stabilized on the line Dvinsk - Smorgon - Baranovichi - Pinsk.

== Interwar period ==
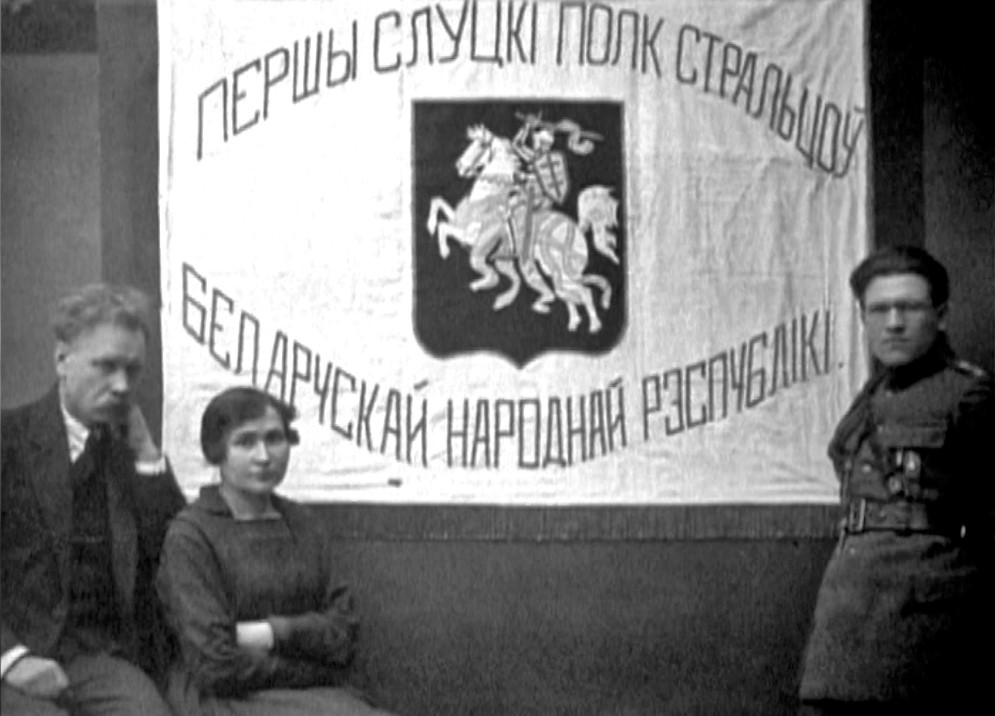
Banner of the 1st Slutsk Regiment, which organized the 1920 uprising.

After the October Revolution of 1917, a struggle between the Bolsheviks and the Belarusian national movement began in Belarus. In 1918, the Belarusian lands were drawn into the Russian Civil War. The key participants in the conflict in the region were supporters of the Belarusian Democratic Republic and supporters of Soviet power represented by the Obliskomzap (later - SSRB, Litbel, BSSR). Eventually, at the beginning of 1919, Bolshevik power was established here.

In January 1918, the Polish Corps of Dovnor-Musnitsky revolted in Belarus. The rebels took Rogachev, Zhlobin and Babruisk, but were quickly defeated by the Soviet government. In February, hostilities against the Germans intensified. At this time, the Kaiser's army went on the offensive on the Eastern Front. The Bolsheviks were unable to contain the enemy, so they agreed to conclude the Treaty of Brest-Litovsk. By that time, most of the country was occupied.

In the fall of 1918, the Red Army launched an offensive in the Belarusian direction. Its advance did not meet any resistance. Since the troops of the Rada of the Belarusian Democratic Republic were not fully formed. By December 10, Soviet troops reached the Dvinsk-Minsk-Slutsk-Shatilki line, occupying almost half of the territory of Belarus. and continuing the offensive in the western regions.

In February 1919, Poland invaded Belarus. By mid-March, the Poles captured the western regions of the country. In the summer, they continued their successful offensive and took Minsk on August 8. In March 1920, an offensive operation began in southeastern Belarus, as a result of which Polish troops captured Rechytsa, Mozyr and Kalinkavichy. In May–July, the initiative passed to the Red Army. Already at the end of July, hostilities moved from Belarus to Poland. However, the Red Army suffered a defeat near Warsaw, after which they began to retreat. With the end of the active phase of the Polish-Soviet war, the green armies of the Belarusian national groups (BPS-R, BS-DP, PBS-F) began to operate against the Bolsheviks in the region. Stanisław Bułak-Bałachowicz's troops fought in Polesia. At the same time, the Slutsk uprising began. All these uprisings were suppressed by the Red Army.

In March 1921, the Treaty of Riga was signed, dividing Belarus between the Second Polish Republic and the Bolsheviks. However, the confrontation was not over yet. In Western Belarus, which had gone to Poland, Soviet saboteurs and local pro-Soviet rebels waged an armed struggle until the summer of 1925. Among the leaders of the resistance, Stanislav Vaupshasov, Kirill Orlovsky, Vasily Korzh and Aleksandr Rabtsevich distinguished themselves most. During the interwar period, ethnic Belarusians and natives of the country of various nationalities took part in conflicts in the Far East, China, and Spain as Red Army servicemen and Soviet military specialists. In the latter case, people from Western Belarus also distinguished themselves by fighting in the Dombrovsky International Brigade.

== World War II ==
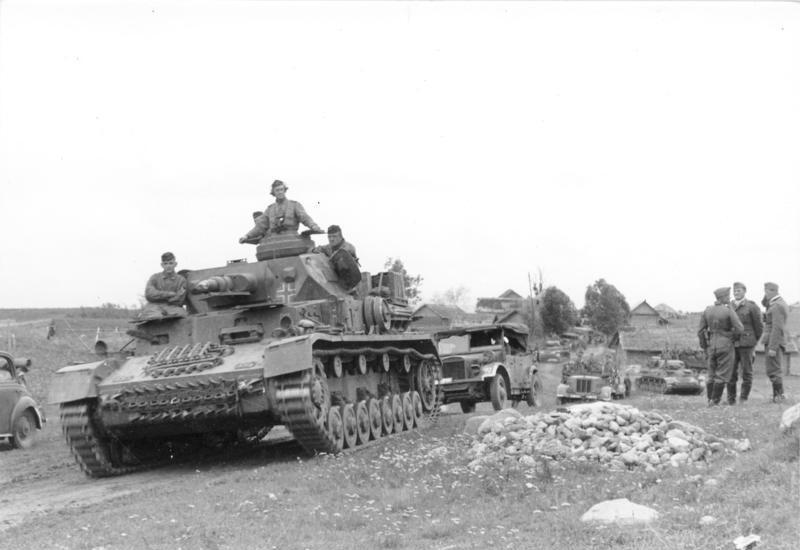
German Pzanzer tanks and vehicles near Vitebsk in July 1941

On September 1, 1939, World War II began with the German invasion of Poland. The Germans quickly routed the Polish Armed Forces, captured Warsaw, and approached Western Belarus. On September 17, in accordance with the Molotov-Ribbentrop Pact, units of the Red Army were brought into the region. By September 25, the Soviet Union had established full control over the region. Western Belorussia was annexed into the BSSR and passed through sovietization process.

From November 1939 to March 1940, about 100,000 representatives of Belarus participated in the Soviet-Finnish War. Belarusians and residents of the BSSR were present at almost all sections of the front and at all levels of command.

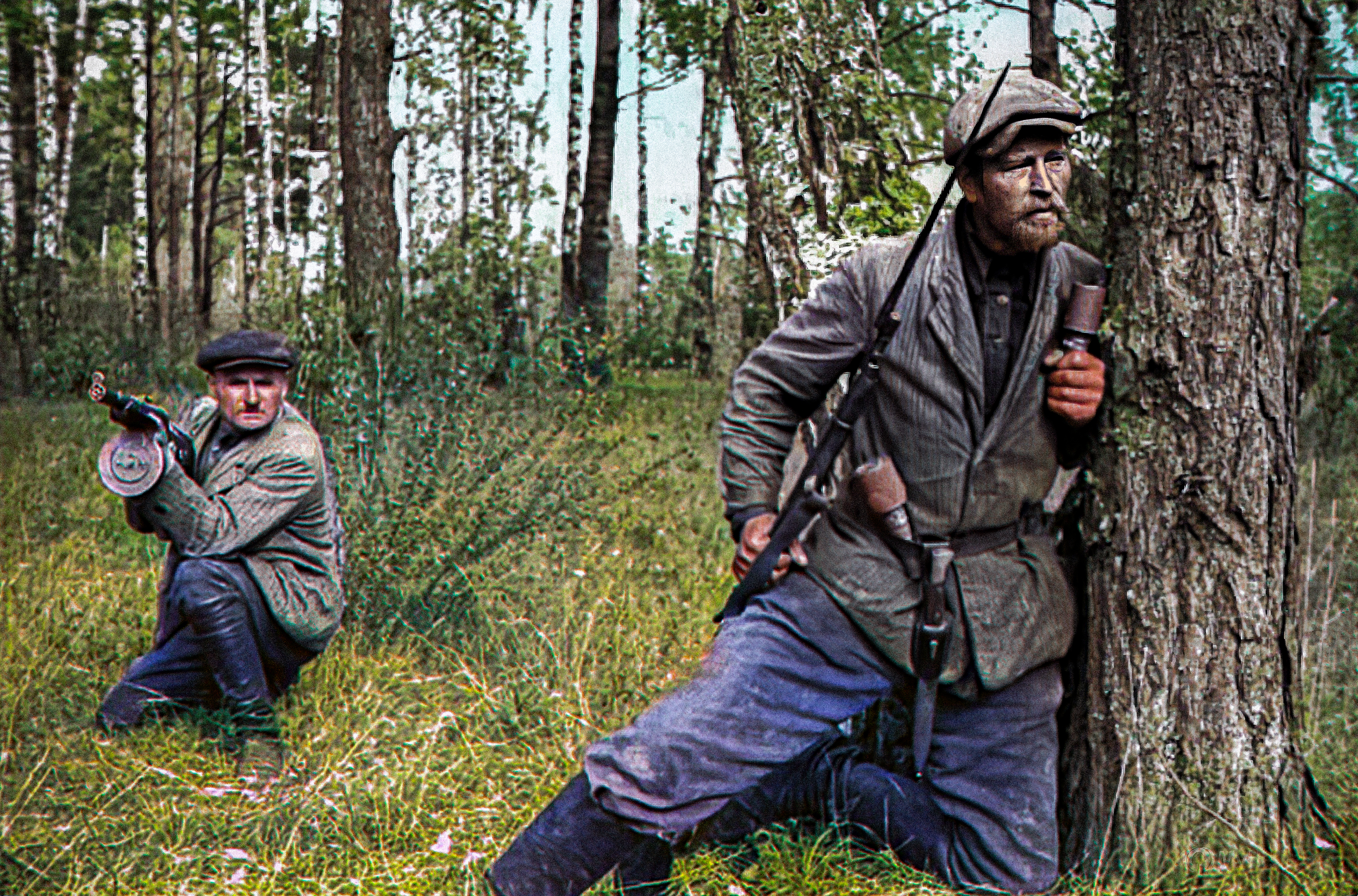
Soviet partisans in Belarus 1943. The partisan on the left is carrying what appears to be a Soviet PPD-40 submachine gun. His companion is equipped with a Mosin rifle (with factory bayonet), plus German bayonet/dagger (on waistband) and two RGD-33 grenade.

On June 22, 1941, the Soviet Union was subjected to German aggression, which began the Great Patriotic War. Border guards and Red Army soldiers serving in the west of the BSSR were among the first to encounter the enemy. The battles took place on two defensive complexes - the Molotov Line (along the new border after 1939) and the Stalin Line (along the old border before 1939). In the initial period of the war, the defense of Brest Fortress stands out among all other episodes. Individual groups of its defenders fought until July 20. Another important event of the first months of the war for Belarus was the Senno-Lepel counterattack, which saw one of the largest tank battles of World War II. In addition, counterattacks were also carried out in the southeast of the BSSR, where Rogachev and Zhlobin were liberated during a successful operation by the Red Army. Among the defensive battles, the most important was the battle for Mogilev, whose defenders held out for three weeks. However, the Red Army was retreating. By the end of August, Belarus was completely occupied.

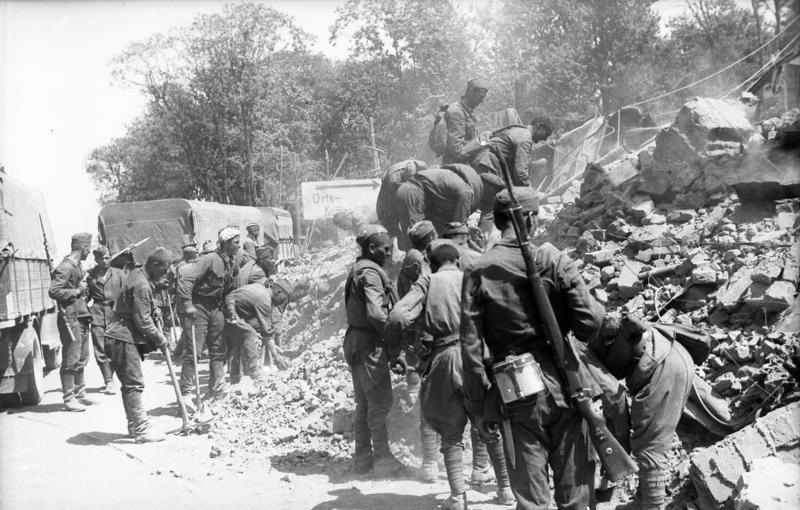
Soviet prisoners of war clearing rubble on the roads of Minsk, summer 1941

A large partisan and underground movement developed in the republic. From the first days of the war, partisan detachments were created in the BSSR. Their activities were supervised by the Belarusian headquarters of the partisan movement. The very first combat operation behind enemy lines was carried out on June 28, 1941 in the village of Posenichi, Pinsk district. The total number of underground fighters and partisans during this time was 440,000 people. Another 400,000 passed through partisan reserves. The existence of the so-called Surazh (Vitebsk) "gates" was of great importance for the development of the partisan movement. An important component was sabotage on the railways. Particularly noted is the explosion at the Osipovichi station, carried out on the night of July 29–30, 1943. This incident became the largest ground-transport sabotage during the entire war. In 1943-1944, explosions on the railways increased as part of the Rail War began.

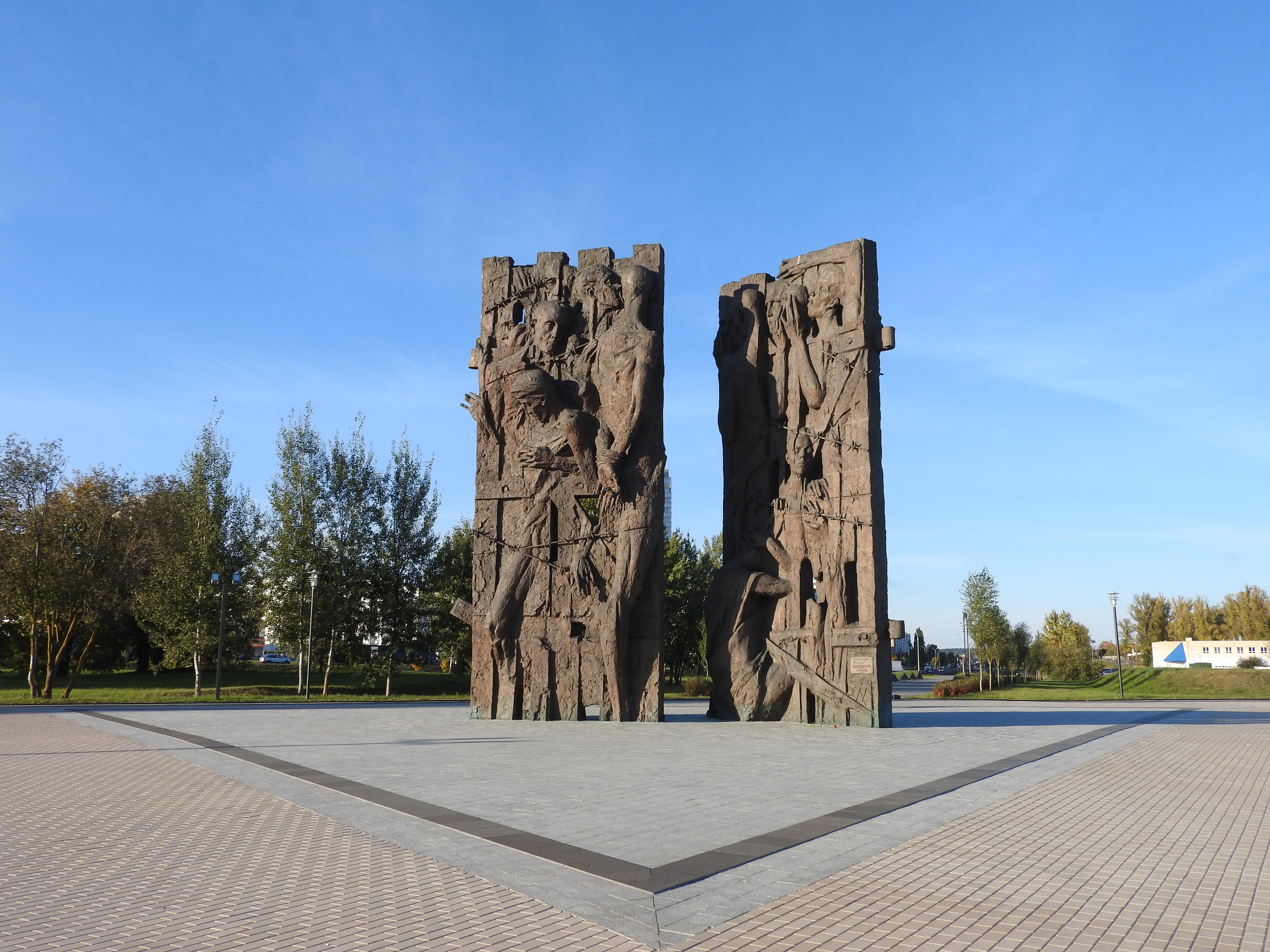
Memorial complex at Maly Trostenets

Over time, the partisans expanded their cooperation with the regular army, which increased the effectiveness of their activities. Gradually, they even liberated some territories. By the end of the war, about 60% of Belarus was under the control of the partisans. A feature of the anti-fascist struggle in the western regions of Belarus was the presence here, simultaneously with the Soviet partisans, of military formations of the Polish Home Army and the Organisation of Ukrainian Nationalists.

In response to armed resistance, German troops carried out more than 140 punitive operations. "Defensive villages" were created on the territory of the BSSR, the armed inhabitants of which were supposed to resist the partisans and underground fighters. Collaborators were involved in countering the Soviet forces: the Belarusian Self-Defense, the Belarusian Home Defence, and police battalions. Russian, Ukrainian, Lithuanian and Turkestan collaborators were also active in the republic.

On September 23, 1943, the first settlement in Belarus, Kamaryn, was liberated. As a result of the successful operation, Soviet troops occupied Gomel on November 26. On February 21, 1944, during the Rogachev–Zhlobin offensive, they reached the Dnieper. On June 23, Operation Bagration began, within the framework of which Red Army units entered Minsk on July 3. Already on July 28, the Red Army took Brest, completing the liberation of Belarus.

In August 1945, after the defeat of Germany, Belarusians in the ranks of the Red Army took part in the Soviet–Japanese War.

== Post-war period ==
After the end of World War II, clashes continued in Belarus, especially in the western regions. The Polish anti-Soviet underground of the Home Army and other formations waged a partisan struggle in the country. The participants in the movement sought to return the lost region to Poland. The period of 1944-1950 marks the peak of their actions. The last detachments of Polish nationalists remained in the Belarusian forests until 1954. In addition, the fight against Soviet power was also waged by Belarusian groups themselves - the Belarusian People's Partisan Movement and the Belarusian Liberation Army (better known as the "Black Cat"). Organized activity continued until 1955, but some small groups carried out actions until the end of the decade. At the same time, the underground of Ukrainian nationalists was active in Western Polesie until 1953.[95] See also: Post-war anti-Soviet movement in the BSSR.

During the Cold War, ethnic Belarusians, natives of the republic of different nationalities, servicemen of the BVO and future citizens of independent Belarus participated in local conflicts of that period: the Korean War, Vietnam War and Angolan war. 28,000 soldiers part of the Limited contingent of Soviet troops in Afghanistan fought in the Soviet–Afghan War. Servicemen of the Byelorussian Military District took an active part in the conflict. The experience of the war showed the directions of development of forms and methods of confrontation, in many ways predetermined the development of military affairs in the future, changing previous views on the essence of conflicts and armed struggle. Subsequently, it turned out to be extremely important and was actively used in the construction and development of the army of independent Belarus. Even in the late 2010s, officers who fought in the Democratic Republic of Afghanistan were still serving in a number of military units, especially in the Air Force and Air Defense Forces.

== Modern period ==
=== Formation of the Armed Forces of Belarus ===
According to the Declaration of State Sovereignty of the BSSR in 1990, Belarus received the right to its own security forces, controlled by the Byelorussian Supreme Soviet. After gaining independence in 1991, the issue of creating a Belarusian armed forces became acute. On March 20, 1992, the Council of Ministers formed the Armed Forces of the Republic of Belarus from units of the Byelorussian Military District of the Soviet Armed Forces.

The country inherited an impressive legacy from the Soviet Union: 1,410 military formations of the BVO, a group of strategic nuclear forces (about 180 formations, units and institutions numbering about 40 thousand people). The concentration of troops in the republic was the highest in Europe. For example, there was one serviceman for every 43 civilians. Belarus received all ground and air defense units, approximately 90% of fighter and bomber aviation, a transport aviation regiment, a strategic bomber regiment, and an airborne division. There was a group of 240,000 people on the territory of the young state. Of these, 125,000 people directly formed the Belarusian army in the spring of 1992.

In 1990, the military district had 3,457 tanks, 3,824 armored vehicles, 1,562 artillery units (over 100 mm), and 79 helicopters.

When Belarus gained independence in 1991 following the dissolution of the Soviet Union, it inherited the personnel and structure of the Byelorussian Military District of the Soviet Armed Forces. These forces, which became part of the newly established Armed Forces of Belarus, significantly exceeded the military-political needs and socio-economic capabilities of the state. In addition, the contingent of troops in terms of combat strength, structure and operational-strategic construction did not correspond to the international and domestic situation. In 1992-1996, the country was demilitarized: 250 military units were disbanded or reformed, the size of the army was reduced, excess weapons were eliminated, and nuclear warheads were removed.

In 1992-1996, 250 military units were reduced or reformed. In 1992 alone, almost 30,000 people were reduced, 7,500 officers and warrant officers were dismissed. In 1993, the Armed Forces had to be reduced by another 24%, 10,000 officers had to be dismissed, which required large financial costs.

Some units were disbanded completely (such as the 50th Donetsk weapons and equipment storage base), more often there was a reduction in level - primarily by converting divisions into brigades. In particular, the 51st Guards Artillery Division became the 51st Brigade, the 6th Guards Tank Division became the 6th Mechanized Division, the 11th Guards Tank Corps became the 11th Guards Tank Brigade, the 103rd Guards Airborne Division became the 103rd Mobile Brigade, and the 50th Guards Rifle Division became the 50th Guards Separate Mechanized Brigade. In turn, the air regiments were transformed into air bases (initially there were 8 of them). Thus, the 61st Fighter Air Base began to be based at the Baranovichi airbase, the 50th Mixed Air Base in Machulishchi airbase, the 116th Guards Assault Air Base in Lida airbase, and the 927th Fighter Air Base in Bereza. In 1993, the 28th Combined Arms Red Banner Army was transformed into the 28th Army Corps. At the same time, the 7th Tank Army was renamed the 7th Army Corps as part of the Armed Forces of the Republic of Belarus, and in 1994, the 65th Army Corps.

After disbandment, the units of some units were divided between other formations. Something similar happened with the 127th Anti-Aircraft Missile Brigade, where one group of divisions formed the 127th Anti-Aircraft Missile Regiment, and the other became part of the 115th Anti-Aircraft Missile Regiment.

In addition, in 1992-1994, some aviation units of Long-Range Aviation, Frontline Aviation, Air Defense Aviation, and Military Transport Aviation were withdrawn from the country to Russia or disbanded on the spot. Among them is the 22nd Guards Heavy Bomber Aviation Division.

=== Armament and Equipment ===
The processes of liquidation of weapons and equipment were in full swing. In total, in the early 90s, Belarus at its own expense reduced weapons and military equipment by 2.8 times more than Great Britain, France and the United States (in Europe) combined. The country liquidated 1,773 battle tanks, 1,341 combat armored vehicles and 130 combat aircraft, which is about 10% of the weapons and military equipment liquidated by all thirty states parties to the Treaty on Conventional Armed Forces in Europe. In the period 1992-1996, the Yakovlev Yak-28 supersonic jet military aircraft and the 3rd generation MiG-25 interceptor fighter were completely removed from service.

One of the key measures was the missile and nuclear demilitarization of Belarus. 1,120 warheads were withdrawn from the country's territory to Russia. 584 missiles were subject to liquidation under the 1987 Intermediate-Range Nuclear Forces Treaty. The rest were taken by the Russian Strategic Rocket Forces.

The costs of reducing combat aircraft and armoured vehicles alone amounted to almost half a billion rubles (in 1992 prices). For these purposes, the 140th Tank Repair Plant in Borisov (dismantling and re-equipping tanks and infantry fighting vehicles for use in the national economy), the 558th Aircraft Repair Plant in Baranavichy (disassembling aircraft), a special base in Stankovo (disassembling armored personnel carriers and MT-LBs), and the Zhlobin Metallurgical Plant (remelting armored vehicle hulls) were used. The leadership believed that the liquidation of military equipment would provide the republic with about 50 thousand tons of high-quality metal. In addition, some of the units, assemblies and mechanisms can be used for civilian purposes.

In April 1992, the country signed the Lisbon Protocol, which obliged it to reduce strategic offensive weapons. Belarus also joined the Treaty on the Non-Proliferation of Nuclear Weapons.

On July 10, 1992, in Helsinki, Finland, the Belarusian delegation signed the final act of the negotiations on the number of personnel of conventional armed forces in Europe. The document obliged the country to reduce its army to 100 thousand people.

At the same time, the Republic of Belarus, as an equal member of the United Nations, assumed a number of international obligations in the field of disarmament and arms control, taken back in the Soviet Union. In particular, the country began to implement the terms of the 1990 Treaty on Conventional Armed Forces in Europe. The agreement obliged the republic to adhere to the course of establishing a safe and stable balance of armies, as well as to combat inequality and military potential that could be used to carry out a surprise attack and begin large-scale offensive operations in Europe.

=== Lukashenko period ===
Following the 1994 presidential election Alexander Lukashenko came to power. Defense Minister Leonid Maltsev (1995-1996 and 2001-2009) and the head of the EsooM analytical center Sergei Musienko determined the launch of real reform of the army at the beginning of his presidency and there was anticipation among military officers to see what steps the president would take with regard to the armed forces.

The new leader had reasons to begin modernizing the armed forces. Firstly, Lukashenko was unsatisfied with the destruction of the equipment of the Byelorussian Military District. Secondly, the head of state was wary of NATO expansion. In the first weeks of his rule, he decisively stopped the disposal of armoured vehicles and aircraft. Against this background, in early 1995, official Minsk suspended the implementation of the Treaty on Conventional Armed Forces in Europe. At that time, Lukashenko intended to stop the removal of strategic weapons, which he proposed that Russia leave in the republic. At that time, there were still 72 nuclear warheads on its territory.

By this time, the prestige of military service had fallen sharply. Thousands of officers and warrant officers were dismissed, and the number of those wishing to be transferred to the Russian Armed Forces was increasing. The best flight personnel, paratroopers, and doctors were leaving. The total number of paratroopers decreased by 40%. The dynamics of officers' pay is indicative in this regard. Since 1991, the pay of military personnel has decreased several times. In 1994, the pay was: platoon commander - $22, regiment commander - $35.

In the early 1990s, a problem with conscription also arose, which led to a decrease in manning by almost 25%. The number of draft dodgers increased. All this naturally affected the state of the army, especially military discipline. Morale was also at risk. In 1993-1994, crimes and incidents in the army increased several times. By 1994, the number of suicides per 1,000 military personnel increased more than fourfold compared to 1990-1991. In the same year, the Armed Forces recorded the highest crime rate (10.9) in the entire history of the Byelorussian Military District and the modern Belarusian army.

==== Maltsev's activities ====
From 1994 to 2005 a comprehensive set of reform was executed aiming at transforming the armed forces of Belarus. In the second half of the 1990s, Lukashenko was looking for a person capable of carrying out serious reforms for the post of Minister of Defense. At first, Anatoly Kostenko held this post. Then Leonid Maltsev came, who was later replaced by Alexander Chumakov. In March 2001 Maltsev was again appointed defense minister. For the second time, Lukashenko gave the minister complete carte blanche in carrying out reforms in the troops.

First of all, in the early 2000s, the National Security Concept and the Military Doctrine of the Republic of Belarus were updated, as well as a number of other important documents. Soon, the Maltsev organized and conducted the largest operational-tactical exercise in the post-Soviet space at that time, "Neman-2001". It involved about 9-10 thousand military personnel, more than one and a half thousand units of equipment, including new types of weapons, over 130 air defense systems. The training and combat operations took place simultaneously at several training grounds - Gozhsky, Domanovsky, Obuz-Lesnovsky, Ruzhansky and others. As an experiment, new military command bodies were deployed and actually operated at "Neman-2001" - the General Staff, the General Staff of the Ground Forces, the Joint Staff of the Air Force and Air Defense, the command of the Territorial Defense Troops. The experiment with these structures showed good results.

An important feature of the exercise was the participation of border and internal forces, as well as paramilitary units of the Ministry of Emergency Situations. All security agencies acted under the leadership of the Minister of Defense and the General Staff. In developing the concept and plan for the exercise, the experience of combat operations in recent years in various "hot spots" was used to the maximum extent possible. Particular attention was paid to the Yugoslav conflict. Based on it, the organization of information confrontation was worked out using electronic warfare and operational camouflage.

Lukashenko was personally interested in the progress of the tasks and actively communicated with the military. It was then that he first appeared among the officers and soldiers in the field uniform of the commander-in-chief - with a large coat of arms of the country on his shoulder straps and a wide "marshal's" cockade on his headdress. These exercises convinced the president that it was right to count on Maltsev. A new management system was created during the reforms. For example, in 2001-2002, the functions of management bodies were specified, duplicate structures were abolished, and work efficiency was increased. A number of divisions of the military department were reorganized. At the same time, the General Staff was reformed.

==== Structure ====
On November 1, 1994, the Ministry of Defense of Belarus was transferred to a new staff. The transition to a two-service structure of the Armed Forces took place: ground forces and air forces.

In December 2001, the Western Operational Command was created on the basis of the 28th Army Corps (former 28th Army). At the same time, the 65th Army Corps (formed in 1994 from the 7th Army Corps, which was created in 1993 on the basis of the 7th Tank Army) was transformed into the Northwestern Operational Command.

In the same year, the Air Force and Air Defense Forces were united into a single structure. The results obtained during in-depth theoretical research in the field of conducting armed combat in modern conditions served as the basis. In practice and as an experiment, the work of the joint headquarters of the Air Force and Air Defense Forces was tested for the first time during the Neman-2001 exercise. Realistically assessing the importance of operational control of forces and means of detecting and destroying enemy aircraft, in 2002 two operational-tactical commands of the Air Force and Air Defense Forces were formed - the Western and Northwestern.

==== Mobile forces ====
In June 1995, president Alexander Lukashenko issued a decree on the creation of mobile forces, which included the 103rd Guards Airborne Division, reformatted into a brigade, and the 38th Separate Guards Airborne Assault Brigade. In September, the airborne units began operating in the new format.

The 38th, 317th, and 350th Separate Guards Mobile Brigades, as well as the 357th Separate Guards Training Battalion, were created on the bases of the 103rd Division and 38th Brigade. In 2002, the 317th, 350th Brigades, and the 357th Battalion were merged into the 103rd Airborne Brigade, whose separate battalions received the numbers 317, 350, and 357. The 33rd separate special forces detachment was formed under the brigade, which received the unofficial name "SDO" (special sabotage detachment). In 2005, a peacekeeping company was also formed there.

The mobile units became part of the Ground Forces. The general management of the units was carried out by the mobile forces department.

In the early 2000s, the mobile brigades were subordinated to the General Staff, and a department of special operations forces was created as part of the operational department, which increased the level of organized management of mobile units and special forces units. In 2004, the department was reorganized into a department.

When the mobile forces were created, it was assumed that their tasks would be combined arms. During exercises, the units were tasked with both offensive and defensive actions, as well as covering individual directions. Mobility, which was their main advantage, was not actually used by the command. However, later, mobile force units began to work on individual special operations tasks, mainly related to countering illegal armed formations and airborne sabotage forces of the enemy.

==== Territorial Defense ====
In the early 2000s, in the context of a reduction in the number of the soldiers and a decrease in the level of weapons, one of the most cost-effective ways to compensate for forces and resources, maintaining the defense capability of the state at the proper level was the organization of territorial defense. Based on foreign experience, the military command came to the conclusion that a serious threat to the country could come not only from a foreign state, but also from extremist and terrorist groups. Based on the wars in Afghanistan and Chechnya, where the scale of damage from sabotage work significantly expanded and increased, it became necessary to create rear security units. Historical experience, especially the Great Patriotic War, has shown that in the event of a full-scale war, guerrilla operations are capable of significantly constraining and weakening the enemy's forces. All these factors contributed to the creation of territorial troops.

In 2002, at the Borisov military training ground, during the operational-tactical exercise "Berezina-2002", practical actions of territorial troops were worked out for the first time.

==== Military-industrial complex ====
On December 30, 2003, the president Lukashenko issued decree No. 599. Based on the document, control and coordinating functions in the activities of all organizations of the country's military-industrial complex were transferred to the newly formed State Military-Industrial Committee, which made it possible to increase the efficiency and effectiveness of work in the military-technical sphere, giving it the necessary systematics, orderliness and planned nature.

From this moment on, the modernization of previously developed models and weapons long available to Belarus began. The country has established the production of domestic means and systems of fire destruction, military radio electronics, optics, optoelectronics, software packages for military information systems and weapons control systems. The products were presented at specialized international exhibitions and salons. The developments of the Belarusian military-industrial complex interested foreign buyers, who actively purchased its products. Previously, the defense sector of the Belarusian economy was disunited due to departmental affiliation with various industries.

==== Educational complex ====
In the late 1990s and early 2000s, qualitative changes were made to the military education system. The restructuring of the training system for junior commanders and military specialists was completed. A system for training specialists similar to a military educational institution was created. Schools for training junior specialists were created on the basis of the training regiments of the 72nd Joint Training Center. At the same time, support functions were assigned to the centers of logistic and technical support. As a result, the quality of training of cadets was improved, and their separation from combat training was eliminated. A school for ensigns was also created on the basis of the center. From 2001 to 2005, more than 2,100 people were trained there, including more than a hundred women.

Military disciplines began to be taught in state universities. In 2004, a military faculty was created at Grodno State University. Training in civilian universities is several times cheaper than training the same specialists in military educational institutions of other countries, so it was possible to save some money. At the same time, given that the number of reserve officers significantly exceeded the needs of the Armed Forces, and there was a certain deficit in a number of specialties of junior military specialists, since 2003 it was decided to switch to training students in military faculties and departments under the program of junior specialists.

An important step was taken on May 17, 1995, when the Military Academy of Belarus was founded by presidential decree. It became the leading educational institution in the system of training, retraining and advanced training of military personnel. The university received seven faculties - combined arms, communications and automated control systems, the faculty of missile forces and artillery and missile and artillery weapons, air defense, military intelligence, aviation, internal troops. The training of specialists in 19 specialties, 6 areas and 31 specializations was launched. The teaching staff consisted of about 700 teachers, including 20 doctors and 250 candidates of science, 25 professors and 200 associate professors. The Academy was created on the basis of two institutions - the Minsk Higher Military Engineering and the Minsk Higher Military Command.

==== Ideological work ====
Ideological work in the Armed Forces of Belarus was in crisis in the first half of the 1990s. Only enthusiasts from among the officers saved the situation. In 1995-2003, various experiments and studies were conducted in the direction of ideological work, which later led to the emergence of effective and sustainable management models, strengthening order in the army. During the reforms of 2004-2005 and the creation of the Main Directorate of Ideological Work, educational activities were streamlined.

In the first half of the 2000s, a new legal framework for ideological work was developed, and some of its aspects were changed. If previously educational activities were carried out exclusively with military personnel, now it also includes civilian employees of the Armed Forces. In 1994-2004, political work was carried out in the system of state and legal training. In 2005, instead of classes in state and legal training, classes in ideological training were introduced.

It is based on the official state ideology, the so-called "ideology of the Belarusian state", a legally formalized system of ideas, ideals and values, which reflects the goals and characteristics of the Belarusian path of social development. The basic principles and goals of the development of the Belarusian state are enshrined in the constitution. The foundation is security, territorial integrity, independence, sovereignty and welfare of citizens. Ensuring this is directly related to the functions and tasks of the armed forces.

==== Combating Crime ====
In 2001-2009, Leonid Maltsev achieved significant success in restoring order in the army. In particular, cases of hazing, crime and suicide in military units were significantly reduced.

Belarus had the lowest crime rate among the armies of the world. The crime rate (the number of offenses per 1,000 servicemen) in 2005 was 3.4%, while in 1994 it was 10.9%. In 2008, the index of criminal activity in the Belarusian Armed Forces was 3.6. In turn, in 1994, the number of suicides in the armed forces was 42 cases per 100,000 servicemen, while in 2008 it decreased almost 4 times, and all of them are associated exclusively with medical conditions, and not with hazing. According to the Belarusian Ministry of Defense, if in 2008 in the country as a whole approximately 3 people out of 10 thousand took their own lives, then in the army this figure was about 1 out of 10 thousand people – three times less.

==== 2000s ====
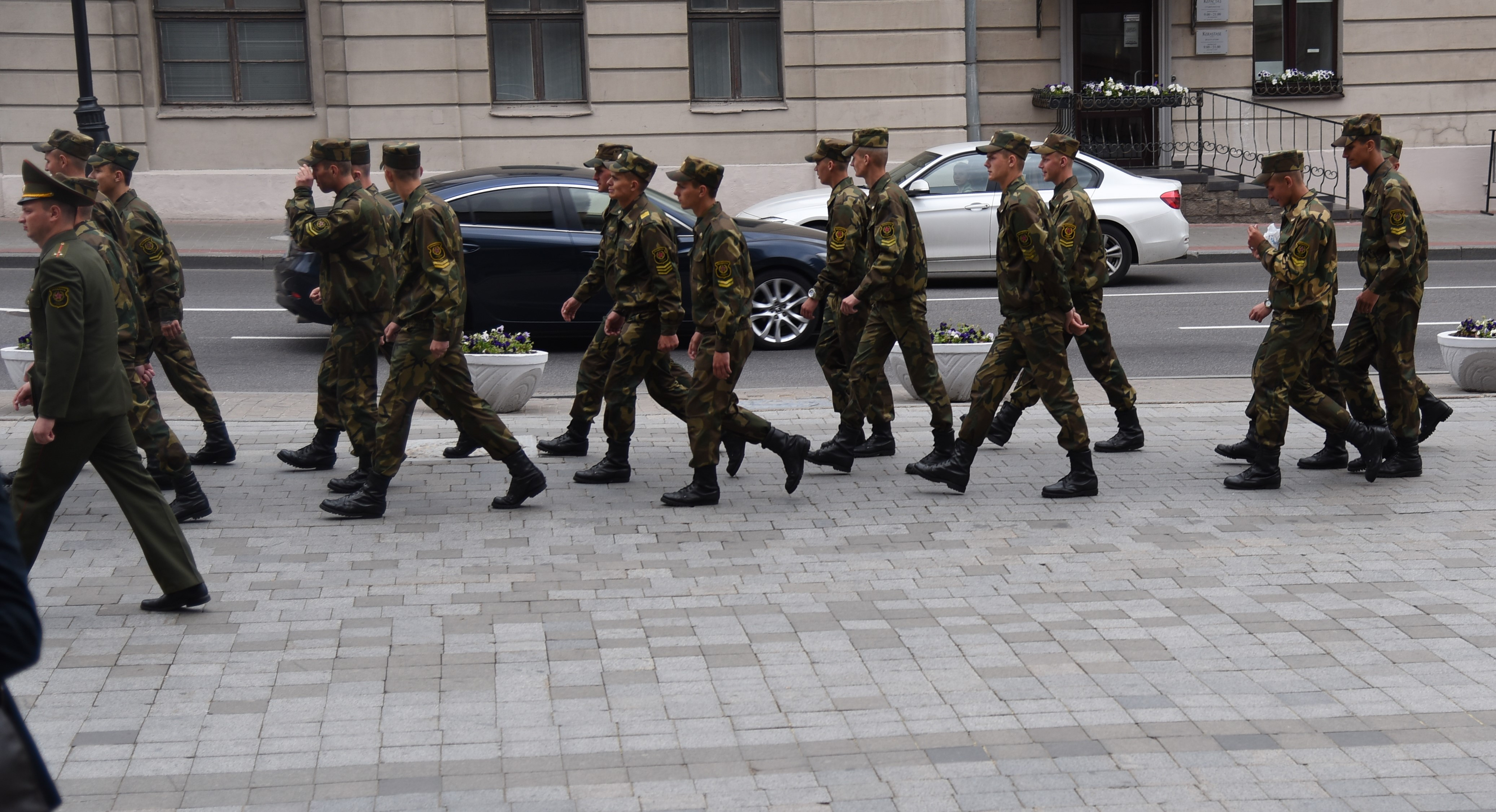
Belarusian soldiers marching in Minsk, May 2019

In the second half of the 1990s, many problems related to the creation of military command and control bodies and personnel training were resolved. Most associations, formations, military units and institutions were reformed, the principle of territorial manning of troops with conscripts was introduced, and the system of troop training was optimized.

A new type of military service, contract military service, was actively developed.

By 2005, the reform was completed, and all systems necessary for the functioning of the army in the new conditions were created. Positive results were achieved in all main areas of reform: in improving the command and control system, strengthening the mobilization deployment base and optimizing the organizational structure, improving the system of manning troops and training junior military specialists, as well as the military education system. Subsequently, the construction and development of the armed forces were carried out in a dynamic, rapidly changing environment. Based on a deep analysis of the military-political situation, the results of scientific research, as well as a summary of the experience of military conflicts, the results of operational training, including large-scale exercises, plans for the construction and development of the army for each five-year period were developed.

Following the dissolution of the Soviet Union not everyone was able to adapt to civilian work, and some of those fired became mercenaries. Thus, retired Belarusian military personnel, and in some cases state military specialists, took part in conflicts in Ivory Coast, Libya, Sierra Leone, Democratic Republic of Congo and Yemen. The Tajik case is noteworthy, when in the early 1990s, Belarusians from former Soviet formations were unable to return to their homeland in a timely manner, and were forced to participate in the Tajikistani Civil War. The largest-scale participation of Belarusians in military operations abroad in the 21st century occurred within the framework of the Ukrainian conflict.

In January 2022, the Armed Forces of Belarus took part in the CSTO operation in Kazakhstan. Belarusian peacekeepers were responsible for protecting the Zhetygen airfield and the artillery ammunition arsenal in the city of Qonayev. Following the Russian invasion of Ukraine in February 2022, units such as Busly liaciać began partisan operation to harm and destroy Russian rear supplies while other units such as the Kastuś Kalinoŭski Regiment participated in direct combat.
