= Territorial Defense Troops of Belarus =

- Войскі Терытарыяльнай абарёны Белярус
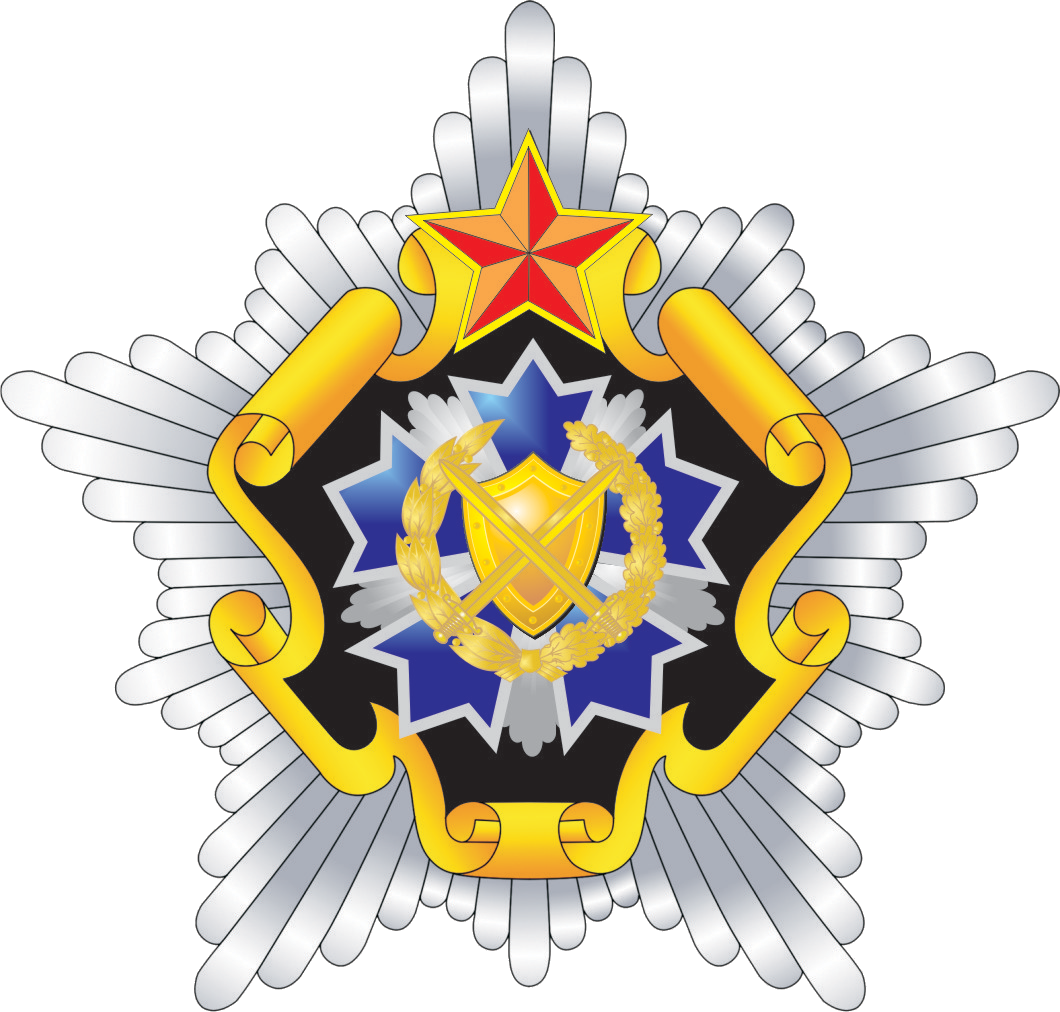
- Founded: 1 September 2011
- Country: Belarus
- Type: Command
- Part of: Defence Ministry of Belarus; Armed Forces of Belarus
- Garrison/HQ: Minsk

Commanders
- Commander-in-chief: Alexander Lukashenko
- Chief of the General Staff: Major General Pavel Muraveiko
- Commander of the Territorial Defense Troops: Andriy Paseko

The Territorial Defense Troops of Belarus (Belarusian: Войскі Терытарыяльнай абарёны Респубіліки Белярус) are a branch of the Armed Forces of the Republic of Belarus that is convened only during wartime or during periods of tense military-political situations. The Territorial Defense Troops are of auxiliary importance and consist of individuals who have served their term of service and are in reserve. September 1 is the Day of the Territorial Defense.

== History ==
In the early 2000s, in the context of a reduction in the size of the armed forces and a decrease in the level of armaments, one of the most cost-effective ways to compensate for forces and means, maintaining the state's defense capability at the proper level was the organization of territorial defense. Based on foreign experience, the military command came to the conclusion that a serious threat to the country could come not only from a foreign state, but also from extremist and terrorist groups. Based on the Soviet–Afghan War and First and Second Chechen wars, where the scale of damage from sabotage work significantly expanded and increased, there was a need to create rear security units. Historical experience, especially the Great Patriotic War, has shown that in the event of a full-scale war, guerrilla operations can significantly tie down and weaken the enemy's forces. All these factors contributed to the creation of territorial troops. In 2002, at the Borisov military training ground, during the operational-tactical exercise “Berezina-2002”, practical actions of territorial troops were worked out for the first time. The Territorial Defense Directorate of the General Staff of the Armed Forces of Belarus was formed on September 1, 2011. The basis of the Directorate was the officer corps of the command and the Main Staff of the Belarusian Ground Forces, who had experience in practical work on organizing territorial defense. In the period from 2011 to 2012, the Territorial Defense Directorate developed new organizational and staff structures of military units of the territorial troops, and their combat capabilities were increased. On February 20, 2023, during the 2022 Russian invasion of Ukraine, a meeting of the Belarusian Security Council, convened by President Alexander Lukashenko, announced the formation of a "people's militia", which could involve 100-150 thousand people.

== Objectives and tasks ==
The Territorial Troops are intended to perform the following tasks:

- Security and protection of facilities;
- Ensuring the mobilization of assigned personnel in case of war;
- Performing individual combat missions jointly with units and formations of the Armed Forces in repelling an act of armed aggression;
- Fighting sabotage and reconnaissance forces and illegal armed formations;
- Conducting guerrilla warfare in enemy-occupied territory;
- Participation in strengthening the protection of sections of the state border;
- Participation in eliminating the consequences of the use of weapons of mass destruction by the enemy, the results of massive strikes, conducting rescue and emergency recovery operations;
- Participation in implementing measures to ensure the maintenance of martial law and other measures to protect the country.

== Composition ==
To solve territorial defense tasks, territorial troops are created, which are a reserve component of the Armed Forces and are deployed in a period of threat or at the beginning of a war.

The number of territorial defense troops of the Republic of Belarus is 120 thousand people, which is twice as many as serve in the regular army. The formations are staffed from residents of the corresponding administrative-territorial units capable of military service. Territorial defense troops include military formations in the form of separate rifle battalions and separate rifle companies.

Today, seven territorial defense zones have been created, corresponding to the regions of Belarus and the city of Minsk. The management of territorial defense zones is carried out by local authorities headed by the chairmen of regional executive committees and the Minsk City Executive Committee and the heads of district executive committees. Operational management of the units of the Territorial Defense Zones in wartime is carried out by the General Staff of the Armed Forces.

Typically, territorial battalions have the following structure:

- Headquarters
- Rifle companies
- Fire support companies and support units (engineer-sapper company, reconnaissance platoon, communications platoon, logistics platoon, automobile platoon, security platoon).

== Commanders ==
- Major General Igor Matrashilo (2011-2017)
- Major General Sergey Grigorovich Dudko (2017-2018)
- Colonel Andriy Oleksandrovych Paseko (2018-incumbent)
