= 231st Mixed Artillery Brigade =

Bularusian military unit

231st Artillery Brigade
- 231-я артылерыйская брыгада 231-я артиллерийская бригада
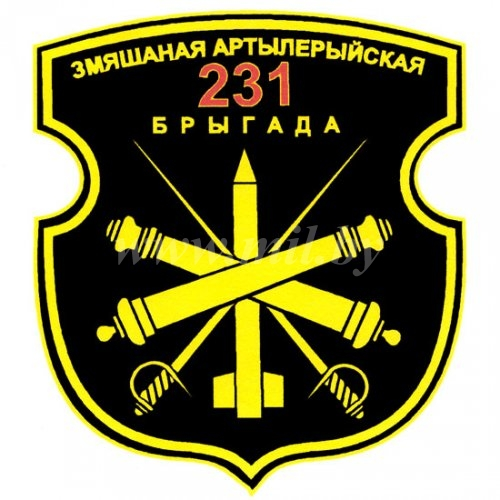
- Founded: 1982
- Country: Belarus
- Type: Artillery brigade
- Role: Land warfare
- Part of: Belarusian Ground Forces
- Headquarters: Borovka
- Equipment: 2S5 Giatsint-S

Commanders
- Commander-in-chief: Alexander Lukashenko
- Chief of the General Staff: Major General Pavel Muraveiko

The 231st Artillery Brigade (Belarusian: 231st Artillery Brigade) is a tactical unit of the Belarusian Ground Forces.

The brigade's headquarters is in the village of Borovka, Vitebsk Region, and it forms part of the Northwestern Operational Command of the ground forces.

== History ==
In 1982, based on the order of the Minister of Defense of the Soviet Union No. 314/1 of December 28, 1982, the 231st Cannon Artillery Brigade was created in the village of Borovka, Byelorussian Soviet Socialist Republic. After that, it was included in the 7th Tank Army of the Byelorussian Military District. Later, during the period of independence, December 28 was established as a holiday for the military unit.

In 1990 the brigade was holding 2S5 self-propelled and 152 mm howitzer 2A65 Msta-B towed guns.

After the republic gained independence, it was reformed into the 231st Artillery Regiment in accordance with the directive of the Minister of Defense of Belarus of Belarus No. 5 of January 4, 1993.

On July 30, 2003, based on the directive of the Minister of Defense of Belarus No. D-53 of November 29, 2002, the 231st Artillery Regiment was reformed into the 231st Artillery Brigade of the Northwestern Operational Command of the Ground Forces of Belarus.

In 2004, the 231st Artillery Brigade was merged with the 427th Rocket Artillery Regiment and the 502nd Anti-Tank Artillery Regiment and renamed the 231st Mixed Artillery Brigade by order of the Minister of Defense of Belarus No. D-6 of 20 February 2004.

In accordance with the directive of the Minister of Defense of Belarus No. D-5 of 12 February 2009, the 231st Mixed Artillery Brigade was renamed the 231st Artillery Brigade as of 1 December 2009.

On 19 February 2005, the brigade was awarded a new-style banner following the issuance of the corresponding decree of the President of Belarus No. 600 of 17 November 2000.
