= 231st Brigade =

231st Brigade may refer to:

- 231st Mixed Artillery Brigade, Belarus
- 231st Brigade (United Kingdom)
- 231st Brigade, Royal Field Artillery, United Kingdom

== See also ==
- 231st (disambiguation)
