= Viktor Gulevich =

Belarusian general

Major General Viktor Gulevich
- Виктор Гулевич; Віктар Гулевіч
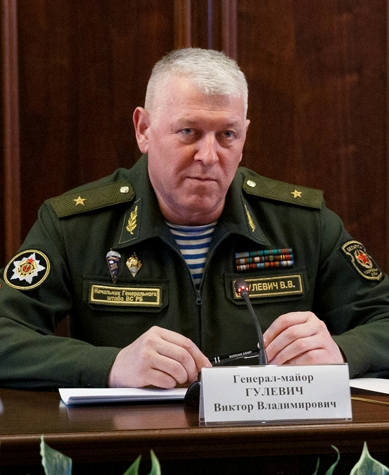
- Gulevich in 2021

Chief of the General Staff
- In office 11 March 2021 – 10 May 2024
- President: Alexander Lukashenko
- Preceded by: Alexander Volfovich
- Succeeded by: Pavel Muraveiko

Personal details
- Born: 14 May 1969 (age 56) Minsk Oblast, Byelorussian SSR, Soviet Union

Military service
- Allegiance: Soviet Union (to 1991); Belarus
- Branch/service: Soviet Army; Belarusian Special Operations Forces
- Years of service: 1987–present
- Rank: Major General

Viktor Vladimirovich Gulevich (Russian: Виктор Владимирович Гулевич; Belarusian: Віктар Уладзіміравіч Гулевіч, romanized: Viktar Uladzimiravich Hulevich, born 14 May 1969) is a Belarusian general who was the Chief of the General Staff of the Armed Forces of Belarus from 2021-2024.

== Biography ==
He was born in 1969 in the village of Bolshaya Pader in the Slutsk District, of the Byelorussian SSR. After graduating from high school, he entered the Moscow Higher Military Command School, which he graduated with honors in 1990. He began his service as a platoon commander in the Group of Soviet Forces in Germany. Then he served in the Transcaucasian Military District. After the collapse of the USSR, he returned to a newly independent Belarus, where he again commanded a platoon and rose to the rank of regimental commander in the 103rd Guards Airborne Division. In 2002, he graduated with a gold medal from the Command and Staff Faculty of the Military Academy of Belarus. He then served in various command positions. On 14 February 2011, Colonel Gulevich led the Combat Training Department of the 38th Guards Air Assault Brigade.

In 2017 he graduated from the Faculty of the General Staff of the Armed Forces of the Republic of Belarus, and in 2018 he defended his PhD thesis.

In February 2020, he was appointed commander of the Western Operational Command. That June, he was promoted to major general. On 11 March 2021, he was appointed Chief of the General Staff, succeeding Alexander Volfovich.

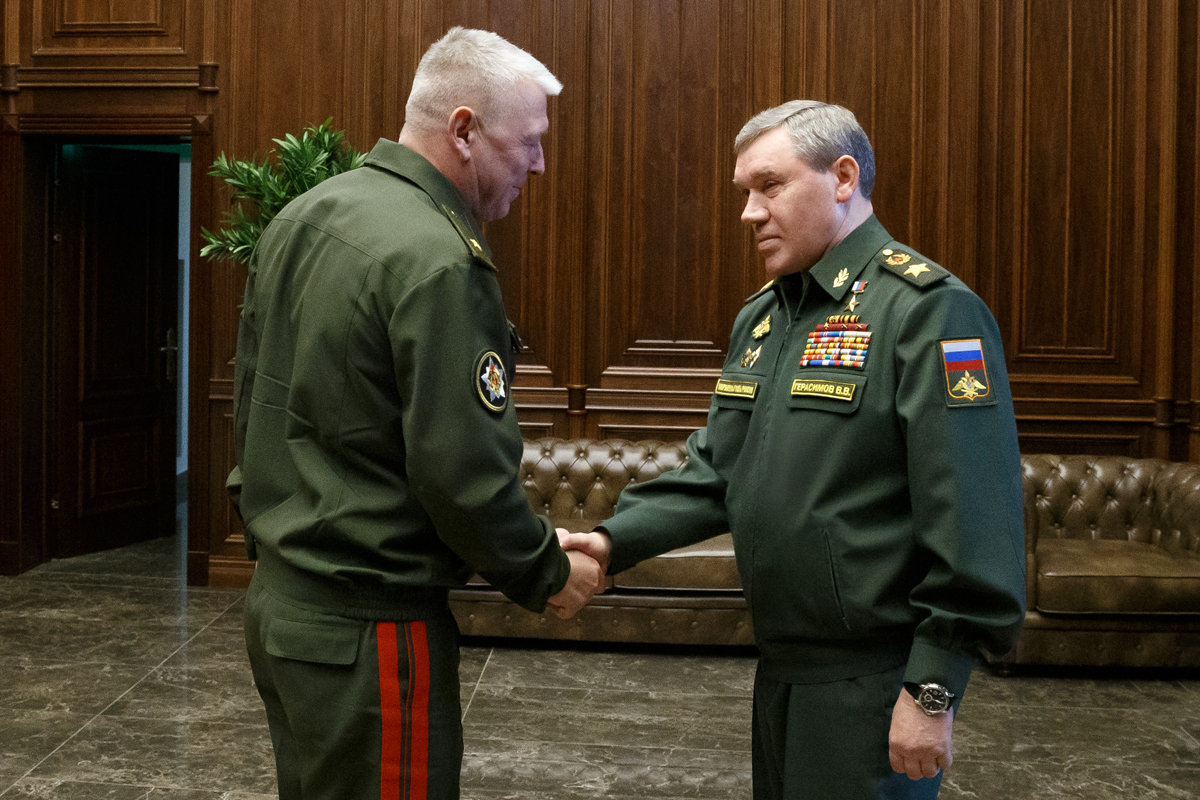
Gulevich with Valery Gerasimov in Moscow.

In March 2022, Ukrainian sources reported his resignation, and posted what is claimed to be his resignation letter. The Belarusian Defence Ministry stated that it was not possible for Gulevich to resign, because the right to dismiss him was held by the Commander-in-chief. The Ministry stated that Belarusian soldiers were fully performing their duties, on Belarusian territory.

=== Sanctions ===
He was sanctioned by the UK government in 2022 in relation to the Russo-Ukrainian War.

In 2022, Gulevich was included in the black list of the EU and in the sanctions lists of the United Kingdom, New Zealand, Japan, Switzerland, Canada, Ukraine and Australia.

== Awards ==
- Honored Specialist Armed Forces of Belarus (March 5, 2019)
- Order "For Service to the Motherland" III degree (June 24, 2012)
- Medal "For Flawless Service" I (August 16, 2018), II, and III degrees

== Personal life ==
He is married, with his wife Victoria Lvovna Gulevich serving as a medical instructor and a signalman in the 38th Guards Air Assault Brigade. Together they have two children: Sergei and Anya.
