= 231st Division =

231st Division may refer to:

- 231st Infantry Division (Wehrmacht), Germany
- 231st Division (Imperial Japanese Army)
- 231st Rifle Division, Soviet Union

== See also ==
- List of military divisions by number
- 231st (disambiguation)
