= Viktor Khrenin =

Belarusian general

Lieutenant General Viktor Khrenin
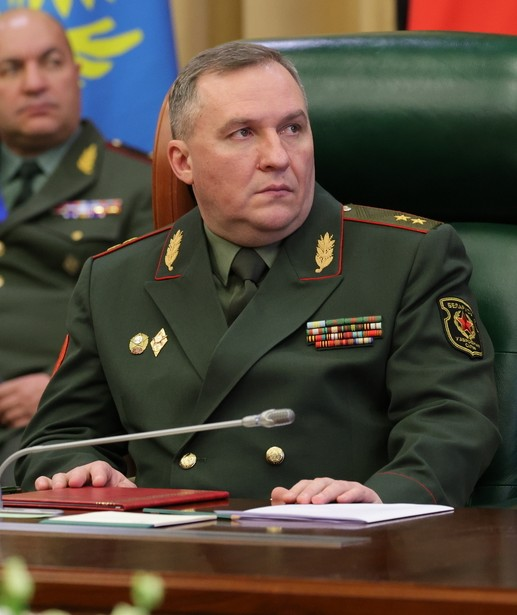
- Khrenin in 2022

Minister of Defence
- Incumbent
- Assumed office 20 January 2020
- President: Alexander Lukashenko
- Prime Minister: Syarhey Rumas; Roman Golovchenko
- Preceded by: Andrei Ravkov

Personal details
- Born: 1 August 1971 (age 55) Navahrudak, Byelorussian SSR, Soviet Union
- Spouse: Natalia
- Children: 1
- Education: Frunze Higher Military Command School; Military Academy of Belarus

Military service
- Allegiance: Belarus
- Branch: Belarusian Ground Forces
- Years of service: 1992–present
- Rank: Lieutenant General
- Commands: Western Operational Command; 11th Guards Berlin-Carpathian Mechanized Brigade

Lieutenant General Viktor Gennadievich Khrenin (Note: Belarusian: Віктар Генадзевіч Хрэнін, romanized: Viktar Hienadzievič Chrenin; Russian: Виктор Геннадьевич Хренин, romanized: Viktor Gennad'yevich Khrenin) (born 1 August 1971) is a Belarusian senior military officer and the minister of defence since 2020. He previously commanded the Western Operational Command from 2015 to 2020.

== Life and career ==
He was born on 1 August 1971 in Navahrudak, a town in the Grodno Region. His father, Gennady Khrenin, was a Soviet Army Colonel in Reserve from the Penza Oblast in Russia. He graduated in 1988 from the Minsk Suvorov Military School. After graduating from the Omsk-based Frunze Higher Combined Arms Command School in 1992, he served as a platoon commander and later a battalion commander in the 6th Guards Kiev-Berlin Mechanised Brigade. After graduating from the Military Academy of Belarus in 2005, Khrenin served as a senior officer in the operational department of the headquarters of the Western Operational Command. After leaving this post, he took a number of leadership positions that climaxed when he became the commander of the 11th Guards Berlin-Carpathian Mechanized Brigade. In 2014, he graduated from the faculty of the General Staff of the Belarusian Military Academy with honours and a gold medal. On 23 June 2015, by decree of President Alexander Lukashenko he was appointed to the post of commander of the troops of the Western Operational Command.

=== Defence minister ===
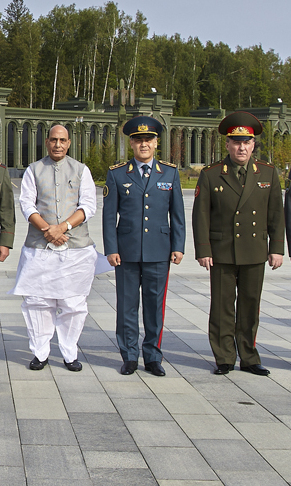
Khrenin (far right) with Rajnath Singh and Nurlan Yermekbayev.

After 5 years in this role, he was appointed in January 2020, by President Lukashenko, to the post of the Defence Minister of Belarus, succeeding Lieutenant General Andrei Ravkov, who himself was made the State Secretary of the Security Council of Belarus. Upon his appointment, he underlined his consistency with military priorities while admitting that he "will have to study and learn a lot".

On the 80th birthday of Anatoly Kostenko, Khrenin personally congratulated the former defence minister in the building of the military department.

During the 2020 Belarusian protests, he compared those marching and protesting under the historical tricolor of the short-lived Belarusian People's Republic to Nazi collaborators during World War II, saying in a statement that "We cannot calmly watch how, under the flags under which the fascists organized the massacres of Belarusians, Russians, Jews, [and] representatives of other nationalities, actions are being organized today in these sacred places". His statement was considered to be unusually politicized and emotionally charged even for an agency like the defence ministry. Khrenin also declared to the military leadership that a military conflict may be unfolding that will require their assistance.

== Sanctions ==
In June 2021, the EU put sanctions on Khrenin. He was also sanctioned by the United Kingdom, Switzerland, Canada, and the United States.

On 25 March 2022, Khrenin was sanctioned by Australia due to having "played a role of significant strategic importance to Russia by allowing Russia to launch attacks from Belarus" in the 2022 Russian invasion of Ukraine. Also in 2022, he was blacklisted by Japan, New Zealand and Ukraine on similar grounds.

== Personal life ==
His wife, Natalya Mikhailovna Khrenina, is the head of the physiotherapy department of the 1134th Military Clinical Medical Center of the Armed Forces.

== Awards ==
- Order "For Service to the Motherland" III degree
- Medal "For impeccable service" I degree (2018)
- Medal "For impeccable service" II degree
- Medal "For impeccable service" III degree
- Jubilee Medal "50 years of Victory in the Great Patriotic War 1941-1945"
- Jubilee Medal "60 years of the liberation of the Republic of Belarus from the Nazi invaders"
- Jubilee Medal "60 years of Victory in the Great Patriotic War 1941-1945"
- Medal "65 years of the liberation of the Republic of Belarus from the Nazi invaders"
- Jubilee Medal "65 years of Victory in the Great Patriotic War 1941-1945"
- Jubilee Medal "70 years of the liberation of the Republic of Belarus from the Nazi invaders"
