= Minsk Higher Military-Political School =

Defunct Russian military academy

Minsk Higher Military-Political Combined Arms School
- Минское высшее военно-политическое общевойсковое училище
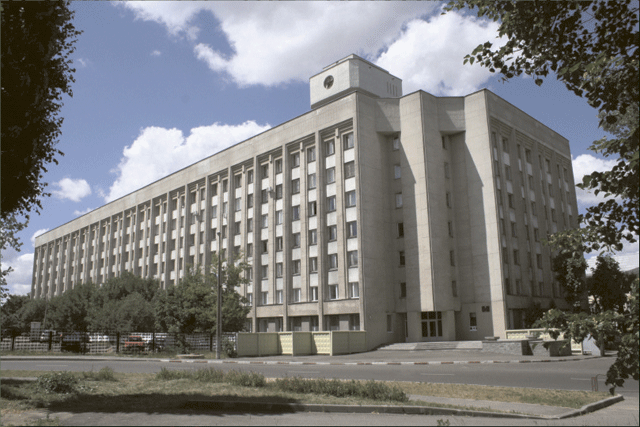
- Type: Military academy
- Active: May 10, 1980–January 1992
- Affiliations: Soviet Army; Belarusian Ground Forces
- Location: Minsk, Belarus

The Minsk Higher Military-Political Combined Arms School (MVVPOU) (Russian: Минское высшее военно-политическое общевойсковое училище; МВВПОУ) was a specialized military higher educational institution of the Soviet Army based in the Byelorussian Soviet Socialist Republic. Located on Kalinovsky Street in Minsk, it served as part of the educational systems for both the Soviet Ministry of Defense and briefly the Ministry of Defence of Belarus.

== History ==
The Minsk Higher Military-Political Combined Arms School was founded on May 10, 1980. Its curriculum was based on the 11 Central Courses for the Improvement of Political Staff (CCPS).

In July 1984, the school graduated its first class of political officers. In 1985, the school granted its first master's degrees in pedagogical sciences to army officers from foreign countries. In late November 1986, CCPS training was given to the senior staff of all military-political schools, including the MVVPOU. On April 26, 1990, the first gathering of honored students of military-political schools took place at the Minsk Upper School of Higher Professional Education.

After the dissolution of the Soviet Union and Belarusian independence, the MVVPOU was transformed into the Minsk Higher Military Command School in January 1992, which became one of the foundations for the newly-created Military Academy of Belarus in 1995. The school was integrated into the military academy as its combined-arms facility.

== Personnel ==
During its existence, the Minsk Higher Military-Political Combined Arms School held 11 graduation ceremonies and trained more than 1,900 officers, 35 of whom were awarded gold medals. The school also had many international students, training 900 people from 21 foreign countries.

More than 150 cadets served in the Soviet-Afghan War, while other graduates participated in the aftermath of the Chernobyl disaster, and in armed conflicts in former Soviet republics, including the Insurgency in the North Caucasus.

=== Heads of the school ===
- Ivan Vasiliev (1980–1987)
- Vladimir Bamburov (1987–1992)
- Michael Shalev (1992–1994)
- V.A. Davidulin (1994–1995)
