= Main Directorate of Ideology of the Ministry of Defence of Belarus =

Cultural ministry of Belarus

- Галоўнае ўпраўленне ідэалагічнай работы Міністэрства абароны Рэспублікі Беларусь; Главное управление идеологической работы

Agency overview
- Formed: 20 February 2004
- Jurisdiction: Ministry of Defence of Belarus
- Headquarters: Minsk
- Employees: Classified
- Agency executives: Colonel Leonid Kasinski, Commander; Colonel Yuri Gerasimovich, Deputy Commander; Colonel Vladimir Makarov, Press Secretary
- Parent agency: Ministry of Defence of Belarus
- Website: Ministry of Defense of Belarus

The Main Directorate of Ideology of the Ministry of Defence of Belarus (Belarusian: Галоўнае ўпраўленне ідэалагічнай работы Міністэрства абароны Рэспублікі Беларусь, Russian: Главное управление идеологической работы Министерство обороны Республики Беларусь) is the military cultural and psychological service of the Republic of Belarus. It is a subdivision of the Ministry of Defence of Belarus and is operated by the General Staff of the Armed Forces of Belarus. The current head of the directorate is Colonel Leonid Kasinski. Since 2005, the official professional holiday of the directorate is celebrated on 15 December.

== Activities ==
Belarus was the first country among the Post-Soviet states where positions of military psychologists were introduced into the structural bodies of ideological work. Established on 20 February 2004, the Main Directorate of Ideology of the Ministry of Defence of Belarus conducts the following duties:

- Participates in the organization of all cultural events in the armed forces, including the Minsk Independence Day Parade and the Victory Day Parades in the capital.
- Hosts musical festivals and military tattoos in the country.
- Provide moral and psychological support for the military
- Implementation of the state military policy of Belarus in the field of ideology.
- Participate in the development and implementation of measures aimed at the development and strengthening in society of a sense of patriotism.
- Directing the education of the military for the devotion and unconditional implementation of the Constitution of Belarus.
- Oversees the management of military rallying
- Ideological training of military/civilian personnel
- Organization of subscriptions to newspapers and magazines in the Armed Forces
- Informing the citizens of the country and the international community on the activities of the Armed Forces such as its participation in military exercises or meetings of military alliances (Council of Ministers of Defense of the CIS).
- Organizes meetings and official visits of Defence Ministers and Chiefs of Staff to Minsk.

These duties have been regulated by the May 2006 order No. 344 “On Approval of the Provision on the Organization of Ideological Work in State Bodies of the Security System and the Prosecution Authorities” and order No. 134 from Minister of Defense Andrei Ravkov on 6 February 2015 "On approval of the Regulations on the main department of ideological work of the Ministry of Defense".

=== Subordinate agencies ===
In work with personnel, forces and means are used that are directly subordinate to the head department of ideological work:

- Military Band Service of the Armed Forces of the Republic of Belarus
- Center for Psychological and Sociological Research
- Belarusian Armed Forces Academic Song and Dance Ensemble
- Dramatic Theater of the Belarusian Army
- Central House of Officers
- Center for Ideological Work
- Studio of Military Writers
- Studio of Military Artists
- Museum of Military History of Belarus

For the implementation of its information needs, the department controls the following subordinate agencies:

- Military Information Agency of the Armed Forces "Vayar"
- Television Company "VoyenTV" of the Ministry of Defense

The Directorate for Perpetuating the Memory of Defenders of the Fatherland and Victims of Wars of the Armed Forces is directly subordinate to the head department of ideological work. As part of the patriotic education of citizens of the Republic of Belarus, the department often interacts with:

- Belarusian Union of Officers
- Belarusian Public Association of Veterans
- Charity Fund "Memory of Afghanistan
- Belarusian Republican Youth Union
