= Pavel Muraveiko =

Belarusian Chief of the General Staff (born 1971)

- Born: 26 September 1971 (age 55); Maryina Horka, Minsk Region, Byelorussian SSR, Soviet Union
- Alma mater: Minsk Higher Military-Political School; Military Academy of Belarus; General Staff Academy of Russia
- Military career
- Allegiance: Belarus
- Branch: Belarusian Ground Forces
- Service years: 1992–2026
- Rank: Major General
- Commands: Chief of the General Staff; Chief of the Main Operations Directorate
- Awards: Order "For Service to the Motherland"

Pavel Nikolayevich Muraveiko (Note: Russian: Павел Николаевич Муравейко, Belarusian: Павел Мікалаевіч Муравейка, romanized: Pavel Mikalayevich Muravyeyka) (born 26 September 1971) is a Belarusian major general who was the Chief of the General Staff of the Armed Forces of Belarus and First Deputy Minister of Defense from 2024-2026. Prior to that he was Chief of the Main Operations Directorate of the General Staff from 2013 to 2022 and First Deputy Secretary of the Security Council of Belarus from 2022 to 2024.

== Early life and education ==
Muraveiko was born on 26 September 1971 in Maryina Horka, in the Minsk Region of the Byelorussian Soviet Socialist Republic, Soviet Union. He graduated from the Minsk Higher Military-Political School in 1992.

== Military career ==
He served in the motorized rifle forces of the Belarusian Ground Forces, holding commands at the platoon, company, and battalion level before attending the Military Academy of Belarus. After graduating in 2001 with a gold medal, Muraveiko held staff positions at the Main Operations Directorate of the General Staff of the Armed Forces of Belarus. He then attended the General Staff Academy of Russia and graduated in 2008 with a gold medal, continuing to work at the Main Operations Directorate and eventually becoming the First Deputy Chief of that organization.

President Alexander Lukashenko appointed Muraveiko as Deputy Chief of the General Staff and Chief of the Main Operations Directorate on 20 June 2013. In that position he oversaw joint Belarusian-Russian military war games, including Zapad 2021. In January 2020 he and Major General Vadim Denisenko, the head of the country's Special Operations Forces, were commended by President Lukashenko for their contributions to improving the defenses of Belarus.

Muraveiko was the head of the Main Operations Directorate from 2013 until 10 February 2022, when he became First Deputy State Secretary of the Security Council of Belarus. In September 2023 he said that Belarus is open to conducting joint military exercises with Poland, and that Belarus will continue doing so with Russia within the context of the Union State, with other partners of the Collective Security Treaty Organization. He also stated that Belarusian personnel have gone to training courses in Russia for the management of nuclear weapons.

=== Chief of General Staff ===
Major General Pavel Muraveiko was appointed as Chief of the General Staff of the Armed Forces of Belarus and First Deputy Minister of Defense by President Alexander Lukashenko on 23 May 2024.

In July 2024 he said that Belarus is willing and capable of using nuclear weapons in its defense. Earlier that year Russia stationed its own nuclear weapons in Belarusian territory.

In December 2024 Muraveiko unveiled the military's plan for developing the defenses of Belarus from 2026 to 2030 at a session of the Security Council, which was approved by President Lukashenko. At the same meeting, Lukashenko told Muraveiko to prepare the military for the deployment of Russian Oreshnik missiles in Belarus.

== Post-military ==
On September 28, 2026, he was dismissed from the post of Chief of the General Staff and was appointed to the post of Deputy Head of the Presidential Administration of Belarus under chief of staff Dmitry Krutoi.

From November 16, 2026, he was appointed Chairman of the Vitebsk Regional Executive Committee.

== Notes ==
Political offices
Preceded by ??	First Deputy State Secretary of the Security Council of Belarus; 2022–2024	Succeeded by ??
Military offices
Preceded by Vladimir Sulimov	Deputy Chief of the General Staff of the Armed Forces and Chief of the Main Operations Directorate; 2013–2022	Succeeded by Sergey Lagodyuk
Preceded by Viktor Gulevich	Chief of the General Staff of the Armed Forces of Belarus and First Deputy Minister of Defense; 2024–2026	Succeeded by Uladzimir Bely
