= Nikolai Churkin =

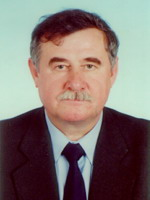
Official portrait.

Nikolai Pavlovich Churkin (Belarusian: Мікалай Паўлавіч Чуркін; Russian: Николай Павлович Чуркин; born February 1, 1949, Krasnoyarsk Krai, RSFSR, USSR) is a Russian-born Belarusian military leader who was the first Chief of the General Staff of the Armed Forces of Belarus.

== Early life and Soviet Army ==
He was born on February 1, 1949, in Krasnoyarsk Krai, RSFSR. In 1972, at the age of 23, he graduated from the Chelyabinsk Higher Tank Command School. In 1980, he graduated from the Malinovsky Military Armored Forces Academy. From 1986 to 1988, he was part of the Limited Contingent of Soviet Forces in Afghanistan, serving as Deputy Chief of Staff to Sergey Akhromeyev and Head of the Operations Department of the 40th Army under by Boris Gromov. In 1990, he graduated from the Military Academy of the General Staff.

== Belarusian Army ==
From 1992 to 1994, he was the Chief of the General Staff of the Armed Forces of Belarus and the First Deputy Minister of Defense of Belarus. In June–July 1994, presidential elections were held, which were won by Alexander Lukashenko, an ember of the Supreme Council of Belarus since 1991. In August 1994, by decree of the new President of Belarus, Churkin was dismissed from all posts and placed at the disposal of the Minister of Defense of Belarus. In 1995, he went into the reserve with the rank of lieutenant general and returned to Russia.

== Return to Russia and political career ==
Churkin at the 19th Baltic Sea Parliamentary Conference in Mariehamn, Finland in 2010.

In 1995, he became the general director of Agroimpex CJSC, established in the city of Odintsovo, Moscow Oblast. He owned 50% of the shares, the other 50% was owned by Yuri Stenin, who worked as the general director of the company until 2001. In December 1995, Boris Gromov was elected a deputy of the State Duma for the Saratov Oblast, after which he appointed Churkin as his assistant. A deputy of the Council of Deputies of the Odintsovo District, he was elected a deputy of the Odintsovo District Council of the Moscow Region. After Gromov was made Governor of Moscow Oblast, Churkin became his advisor on a voluntary basis.

In the elections of January 21, 2001, he was elected a deputy of the Odintsovo District Council of Deputies of the second convocation in single-mandate Electoral District No. 15. Almost a year later, on January 1, 2002, he became a representative of the Moscow Region Government in the Federation Council of Russia, as well as First Deputy Chairman of the Federation Council Committee on Agrarian and Food Policy and Environmental Management. Four days later, he resigned as a deputy of the Odintsovo District Council of Deputies. In early May 2012, his mandate was transferred to Gromov. On October 3, 2008, at the founding conference of the Moscow Region public organization "For a United Moscow Region" he was elected Chairman of its Supreme Council.

== Awards ==
- Order of the Red Star (1987)
- Medal "For Military Merit" (1982)
- Medal of Zhukov (1996)
- Order of Holy Prince Daniel of Moscow
