= Western Operational Command (Belarus) =

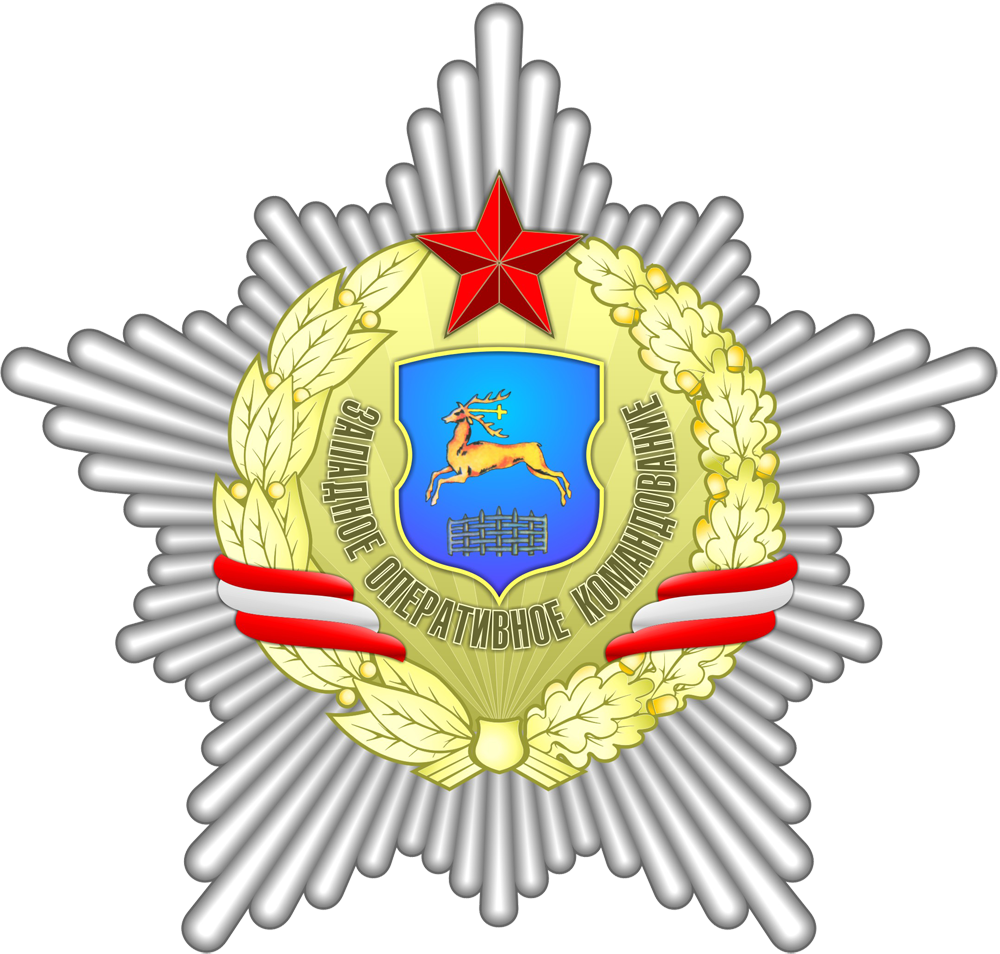
- Active: 2001–present
- Country: Belarus
- Branch: Belarus Ground Forces
- Type: Command
- Garrison/HQ: Grodno

Commanders
- Current commander: Vadzim Suray
- Chief of staff: Colonel Alyaksandr Laurenov
- Notable commanders: Colonel Viktor Khrenin

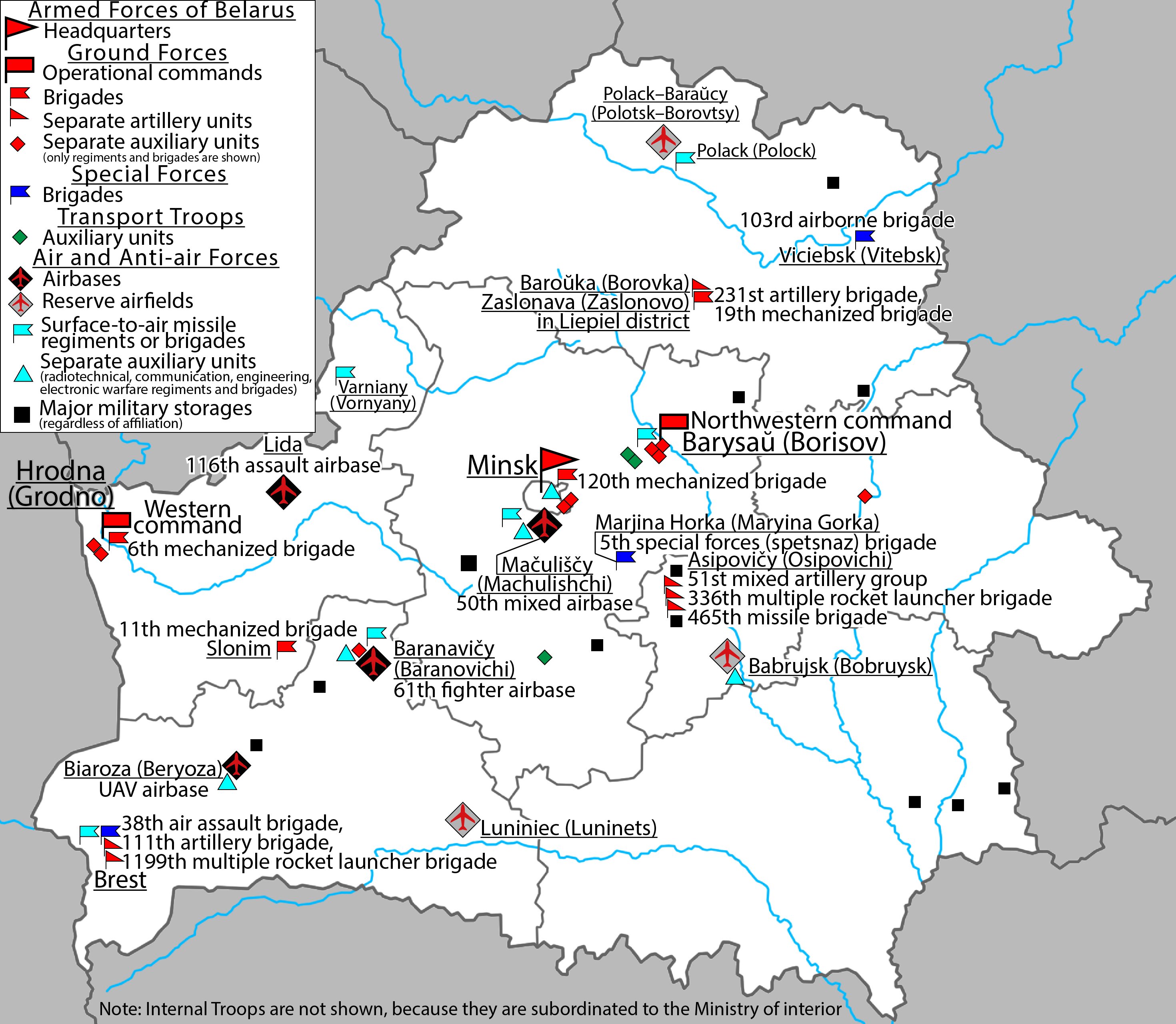
Map showing main military units of the Belarusian Armed Forces

The Western Operational Command (ZOK) is a command of the Belarus Ground Forces. It is headquartered in Grodno. It is composed of two Mechanized Brigades and an artillery brigade. The command was created in 2001 from the 28th Army Corps, the former 28th Army.

== History ==
The Western Operational Command traces its lineage back to the Soviet 28th Army. In July 1945, the 28th Army headquarters was relocated to Grodno. By 1988, the army was composed of the 6th Guards Tank Division, 28th Tank Division, 50th Guards Motor Rifle Division and the 514th Territorial Training Center. On 20 March 1992, the army was taken over by Belarus. In 1993, the 28th Army was downsized to become the 28th Army Corps. In 1994, the 50th Division became a separate mechanized brigade, and was further reduced to a storage base in 2001, then finally disbanded in 2006. The Western Operational Command was created in December 2001 from the 28th Army Corps. It participated in the exercises "Neman-2001", "Berezina-2002", "Chistoye Nebo-2003", "Shchit Otechestva-2004", "Shchit Soyuza-2006", "Zapad-2009", "Shchit Soyuza-2011" and the joint strategic exercises with Russian military units "Zapad-2013". In 2015, Colonel Viktor Hrenin (former deputy commander of the command) became the command's head and Colonel Oleg Melnikov was appointed chief of staff of the command.

== Formations and units ==
The command is composed of the following units.

- 6th Guards Kiev-Berlin Mechanized Brigade (Grodno; former 6th Guards Tank Division)
- 11th Guards Berlin-Carpathian Mechanized Brigade (Slonim)
- 111th Artillery Brigade (Brest)
- 62nd Antiaircraft Missile Brigade – equipped with 9K33 Osa SAM
- 215th Separate Radio Engineering Regiment
- 36th Separate Radio Battalion
- 255th Separate Radio Engineering Regiment of Special Purpose (Novogrudok; ELINT)
- 557th Engineer Regiment (Grodno)
- 74th Berlin Separate Communications Regiment (Grodno)
- 815th Logistics Center (Baranovichi)
- 28th Weapons and Equipment Storage Base (Baranovichi; former 28th Tank Division)
- 50th Donetsk Weapons and Equipment Storage Base (Brest; former 50th Guards Motor Rifle Division, disbanded 2006)
- 108th Separate Material Security Regiment

== Leadership ==
=== Commanders ===
- Major General Anatoly Nikitin (2001 - 2003)
- Major General Aleksandr Pashukevich (?-4 October 2012)
- Major General Igor Demidenko (4 October 2012-?)
- Colonel Andrey Gurtsevich (?-15 January 2015)
- Major General Viktor Khrenin (2015 - 2020)
- Major General Viktar Gulevich (2020 - 11 March 2021)
- Major General Igor Demidenko (11 March 2021 - 30 March 2023)
- Colonel Uladzimir Bely (30 March 2023 - 11 September 2024)
- Major General Vadzim Suray (11 September 2024 - 14 October 2026)

=== Chiefs of Staff - First Deputy Commanders ===
- Colonel Alexei Evstigneev (26 July 2007 - 20??)
- Colonel Alyaksandr Laurenov (28 July 2023 - present)

=== Deputy Commanders ===
- Colonel Vadim Denisenko (?-11 January 2014)
- Igor Demidenko (?-7 June 2020)
- Alyaksandr Bas (7 June 2020- 12 January 2023)
- Colonel Dzimitriy Bitny (12 January 2023-present)
