= 11th Guards Berlin-Carpathian Mechanized Brigade =

6th Tank Corps (1942–1943) 11th Guards Tank Corps (1943–1945) 11th Guards Tank Division (1945–1992) 11th Guards Mechanized Brigade (1990s–present)
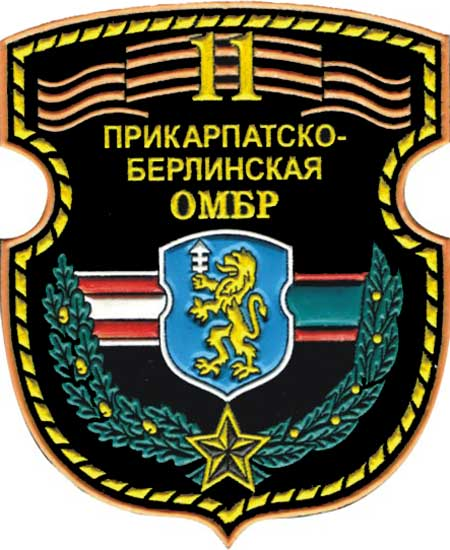
- Active: 1942–present
- Country: Soviet Union (1942–1992); Belarus (1992–present)
- Branch: Soviet Army (1942–1992); Belarusian Ground Forces (1992–present)
- Type: Tank and Mechanized Infantry
- Role: Armored warfare
- Size: Division, Tank Corps, Brigade
- Garrison/HQ: Slonim
- Engagements: World War II; Cold War
- Decorations: Order of the Red Banner; Order of Suvorov 2nd class
- Battle honours: Carpathian-Berlin

Commanders
- Notable commanders: Hamazasp Babadzhanian; Andrei Getman

Key unit locations

The 11th Guards Mechanized Brigade is a unit of the Armed Forces of Belarus based in Slonim. The 11th Guards Brigade traces its history back to the 1942 formation of the 6th Tank Corps of the Soviet Army during World War II.

== World War II ==
Formed in the Kalinin area on 19 April 1942, the 6th Tank Corps was under the command of Major General A. L. Getman and subordinated to the Western Front until March 1943, at which time the corps was subordinated to the 1st Tank Army, remaining under the command of this formation until 1992. The corps fought at Rzhev in 1942 and Kursk in 1943. The 6th Tank Corps commanded the 22nd, 100th, and 200th Tank Brigades, as well as the 6th Motor Rifle Brigade. Also attached at some periods was the 112th Tank Brigade, later to become the 44th Guards Tank Brigade.

On 23 October 1943, the 6th Tank Corps was officially recognized as a skilled combat formation and 'ranged among the Guards' as the 11th Guards Tank Corps. The 11th Guards Tank Corps was in combat near Kharkov in 1943, the offensive to drive the Germans from Belorussia in 1944 (Operation Bagration), and the offensive across central Poland in January 1945.

In April 1945 during the Battle of Berlin, the 11th Guards Tank Corps was part of the 1st Guards Tank Army. It commanded the 40th, 44th, and 45th Guards Tank Brigades, as well as the 27th Guards Motor Rifle Brigade.

== Cold War ==
The 11th Guards Tank Corps, like all Soviet tank corps, was reorganized as a division on 5 July 1945, and was renamed the 11th Guards Tank Division at Dresden. The 11th Guards Tank Division was part of the Group of Soviet Forces in Germany, subordinated to 1st Guards Tank Army (known as the 1st Guards Mechanized Army from 1946 to 1957).

On 6 May 1954, the division was reorganized. The 27th Guards Motor Rifle Regiment became the 27th Guards Mechanized Regiment. The 270th Guards Mortar Regiment and the howitzer artillery battalion became the 841st Guards Artillery Regiment. The 9th Separate Guards Motorcycle Battalion became a reconnaissance battalion. The Chemical Defence Company was created. In June 1957, the division was reorganized again. The 45th Guards Tank Regiment was transferred to the 27th Guards Tank Division. The 7th Guards Heavy Tank Self-Propelled Regiment became a heavy tank unit. The 27th Guards Mechanized Regiment became the 249th Guards Motor Rifle Regiment. In 1960, the 58th Separate Tank Training Battalion was disbanded.

The 638th Separate Missile Battalion was activated in 1961. In 1962, the 7th Guards Heavy Tank Regiment became a regular tank regiment. On 19 February 1962, the 61st Separate Equipment Maintenance and Recovery Battalion was activated. In 1968, the 134th Separate Guards Sapper Battalion became an engineer-sapper battalion. The chemical defence company became the 128th Separate Chemical Defence Battalion in 1972. The motor transport battalion became the 1073rd Separate Material Supply Battalion in 1980. In June 1983, the 638th Separate Missile Battalion transferred to the 432nd Missile Brigade.

=== Composition ===
In 1988, the 11th Guards Tank Division was composed of the following units.

- 11th Guards Tank Division Headquarters, Dresden
- 153rd Independent Guards Carpathian Communications Battalion, Klotzsche
- 9th Independent Guards Brandenburg Order of the Red Star Reconnaissance and Electronic Warfare Battalion, Klotzsche (BMP-1)
- 7th Guards Novgorod-Berlin Red Banner Orders of Suvorov, Bogdan Khmelnitsky and Red Star Tank Regiment, Meissen (T-80)
- 40th Guards Chertkovsky Order of Lenin Red Banner Orders of Suvorov, Bogdan Khmelnitsky and Red Star Tank Regiment Königsbrück (T-80)
- 44th Guards Berdichevsky orders of: Lenin, Krasnoznamenny orders Suvorov, Kutuzov, Bogdan Khmel'nyts'kyi, Red Star Sukhbaatar and the Red Banner Tank Regiment Königsbrück (T-80)
- 249th Guards Chernivtsi Red Banner Orders of the Suvorov and Bogdan Khmelnitsky Motorised Rifle Regiment, Klotzsche (BMP-2)
- 841st Guards Chernivtsi Red Banner Orders of Bogdan Khmelnitsky and Red Star Artillery Regiment, Karl-Marx Stadt (2S3 Akatsiya)
- 1018th Yaroslavl Red Banner Order of Bogdan Khmelnytsky Anti-Aircraft Missile Regiment, Meissen
- 134th Independent Guards Wislen Red Banner Engineer-Sapper Battalion, Königsbrück
- 1073rd Independent Material Supply Battalion, Königsbrück
- 61st Independent Equipment Maintenance and Recovery Battalion, Klotzsche
- 189th Independent Medical Battalion, Hellerau
- 128th Independent Chemical Defence Battalion, Königsbrück

== Post Cold War ==
The 11th Guards Tank Division remained in the German Democratic Republic until 1992, when, with the end of the Cold War, the division was relocated to Slonim and became part of the Armed Forces of Belarus. The division's 44th Guards Tank Regiment went to Vladimir in the Russian Federation, joining the 467th Guards District Training Centre (ex 26th Guards Tank Training Division) in the Moscow Military District. On its arrival it absorbed the 9th Tank Training Regiment.

On 11 August 1992, the division was reorganized and renamed the 11th Guards Mechanized Brigade. The brigade is currently part of the Belarusian Western Operational Command.

An 11th Tank Corps also existed but was a different unit.

== Commanders of the 6th Tank Corps and the 11th Guards Tank Corps ==
- Apr 1942 - Aug 1944: Andrei Getman
- Aug 1944 - May 1945: Hamazasp Babadzhanian
- Colonel Viktor Khrenin (2010 - 2014)
- Colonel Aljaksandr Pahuliajla (2014 - December 2017)
- Colonel Maksim Stročylaŭ (December 2017 - 201?)
- Colonel Siarhiej Šylin (September 2022 - August 2025)
- Colonel Vadzim Iĺnicki (August 2025 - in office)
