= Uladzimir Bely =

Belarusian army officer (born 1977)

- Уладзімір Уладзіміравіч Белы
- Born: Uladzimir Uladzimravich Bely; 17 February 1977 (age 49); Mikolaevshchyna, Belarusian SSR, Soviet Union
- Military career
- Allegiance: Belarus
- Branch: Belarusian Ground Forces
- Service years: 1991-
- Rank: Major General
- Commands: Western Operational Command

Uladzimir Uladzimravich Bely (Belarusian: Уладзімір Уладзіміравіч Белы; Russian: Владимир Владимирович Белый; born on 17 February 1977) is a Belarusian army officer who is currently the Deputy Minister of Defense since 8 June 2026.

He served as the commander of the Western Operational Command from 2023 to 2024.

== Biography ==
Uladzimir Bely was born in Mikolaevshchyna, Minsk Region on 17 February 1977. He graduated with honors from the Military Academy of Belarus in 1991.

He later continued his professional military education at the command and staff faculty of the Military Academy of the Republic of Belarus, completing the program with honors and receiving a gold medal in 2011.

His early military service included command roles in the 120th Guards Motorized Rifle Division, where he served as a platoon and company commander. He later held a series of senior positions within the same formation and its successor units, including deputy commander of a separate motorized rifle battalion, deputy chief of staff, chief of an operational group, commander of a mechanized battalion, and commander of a separate guards mechanized battalion.

Bely subsequently served in senior leadership roles at the army level, including Deputy Commander, Chief of Staff, and First Deputy Commander of the 19th Army. He later held the post of Chief of Staff and First Deputy Commander of the 103rd Military Intelligence Division and served within the General Staff of the Armed Forces.

In 2018, Bely was appointed head of the Faculty of the General Staff at the Military Academy of the Republic of Belarus, where he oversaw advanced officer training. In subsequent years, he served as Deputy Commander and Chief of Staff–First Deputy Commander of the Special Operations Forces.

On 30 March 2023, Bely was appointed commander of the Western Operational Command by President Alexander Lukashenko, succeeding Igor Demidenko. He formally assumed office on 3 April 2023.

On 27 August 2024, Bely was appointed head of the main combat training department of the Armed Forces of Belarus, and thus been replaced by his successor Vadzim Suray.

On 8 June 2026, he was appointed as the Deputy Minister of Defense. On September 28, 2026, by decree of the President of the Republic of Belarus, Major General Bely was appointed Chief of the General Staff of the Armed Forces – First Deputy Minister of Defense.
