= Land warfare =

Military combat on land

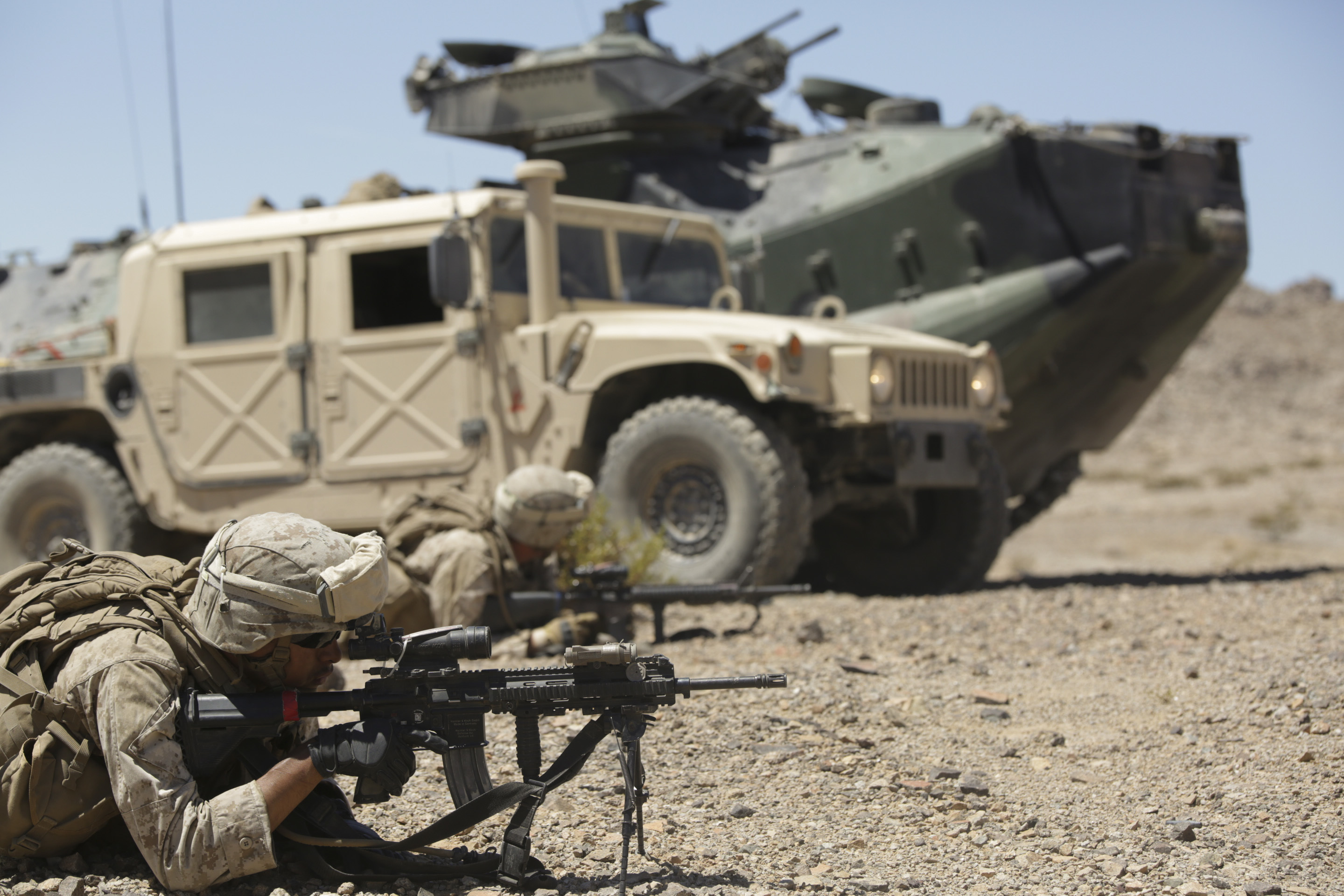
United States Marine Corps infantry supported by armored fighting vehicles during a mechanized operations exercise in 2015

Land warfare or ground warfare is the process of military operations eventuating in combat that takes place predominantly on the battlespace land surface of the planet.

Land warfare is categorized by the use of large numbers of combat personnel employing a diverse set of combat skills, methods, and a wide variety of weapon systems and equipment, conducted in diverse terrains and weather environments. Land warfare, by virtue of being conducted in defence of urban and rural population areas, dominates the study of war, and is a focus for most national defence policy planning and financial considerations.

Land warfare in history has undergone several distinct transitions in conduct from a large concentration of largely untrained and irregularly armed populace used in frontal assaults to current employment of combined arms concepts with highly trained regular troops using a wide variety of organisational, weapon and information systems, and employing a variety of strategic, operational and tactical doctrines.

Although land combat in the past was conducted by the combat arms of the armed forces, since World War II it has largely involved three distinct types of combat units: infantry, armour, and artillery. These arms, since the Age of Sail, have used amphibious warfare concepts and methods to project power from the seas and oceans, and since the wide introduction of military transport aircraft and helicopters have used airborne forces and vertical envelopment to the variety of doctrines used to prosecute warfare on land.

== Land forces ==
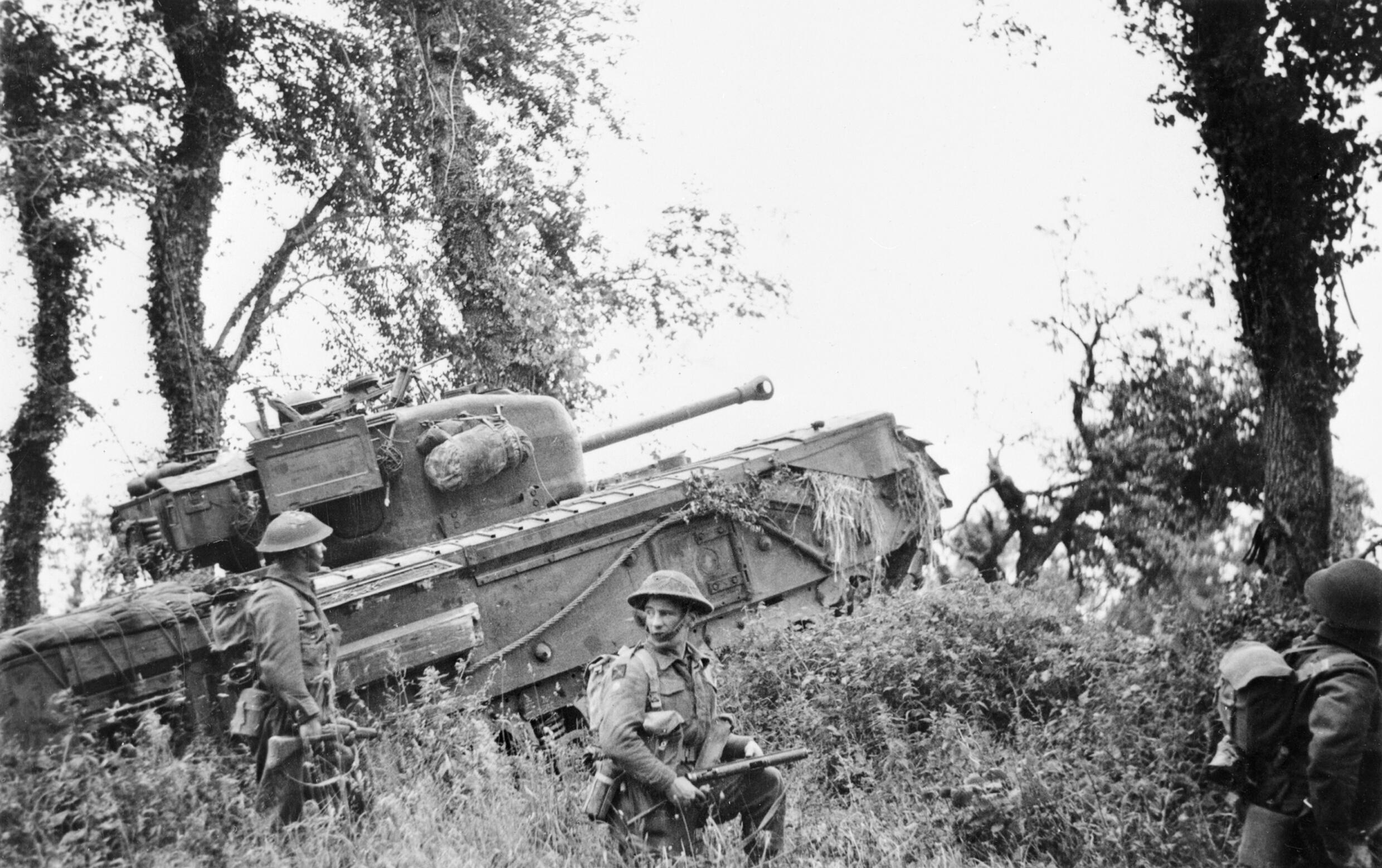
A Churchill tank with British Army soldiers during Operation Epsom of World War II in 1944

Land forces include personnel, weapons platforms, vehicles, and support elements operating on land to accomplish assigned missions and tasks.

=== Infantry ===
Infantry are soldiers who fight primarily on foot with small arms in organized military units. However, they may be transported to the battlefield by ships, automobiles, skis, cargo planes, or other means.

=== Combat vehicles ===
Combat vehicles provide the means to mobilize heavy firepower to engage opposing forces including other combat vehicles. Combat vehicles are usually equipped to drive in rugged terrain. They are usually protected against other common threats with armor and other countermeasures.

Examples of combat vehicles include main battle tanks, infantry fighting vehicles, and self-propelled artillery.

=== Artillery ===
Historically, artillery (from French artillerie) refers to any engine used for the discharge of projectiles during the war. The term also describes ground-based troops, who primarily operated such weapons. The word is derived from the Old French verb attilier, meaning "to equip".

This term includes coastal artillery which traditionally defended coastal areas against seaborne attack and controlled the passage of ships using their ability to deny access through the threat of coastal fire. It also includes land-based field artillery. With the advent of powered flight at the start of the 20th century, artillery also included ground-based anti-aircraft batteries.

== Combined arms ==
Combined arms is an approach to warfare which seeks to integrate different arms of a military to achieve mutually complementary effects, such as, self-propelled artillery, mechanized infantry, aircraft and so forth.

== By landscape and climate ==
- Arctic warfare
- Desert warfare
- Jungle warfare
- Mountain warfare
- Urban warfare
