= Chief of the General Staff (Belarus) =

Head of the Armed Forces of Belarus

- Начальнік Генеральнага штаба Узброеных Сіл Рэспублікі Беларусь (Belarusian)
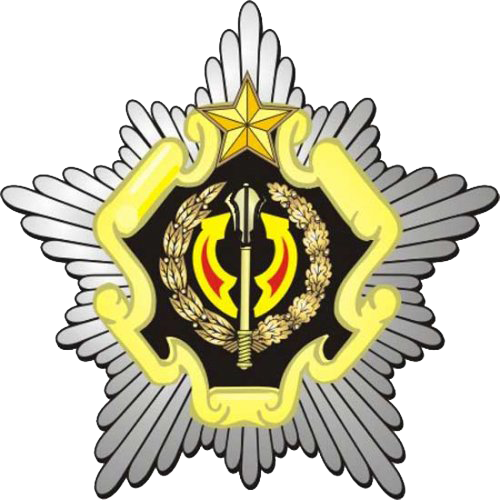
- Emblem of the General Staff

- Flag of the General Staff
- Incumbent; Uladzimir Bely since 28 September 2026
- General Staff of the Armed Forces of Belarus
- Member of: Ministry of Defence
- Reports to: Minister of Defence
- Seat: Minsk, Belarus
- Appointer: President of Belarus
- Formation: 1992; 34 years ago
- First holder: Nikolai Churkin
- Website: Official website

The Chief of the General Staff of the Armed Forces of the Republic of Belarus (Belarusian: Начальнік Генеральнага штаба Узброеных Сіл Рэспублікі Беларусь, romanized: Načaĺnik Hienieraĺnaha štaba Uzbrojenych Sil Respubliki Bielaruś) is the head of the Armed Forces of Belarus and the Belarusian Ground Forces. The office is also dual-hatted as the First Deputy Minister of Defense.

Between 1992 and 2001 the position was the Chief of the Main Staff (Начальнік Галоўнага штаба, Načaĺnik Haloŭnaha štaba).

== List of chiefs ==
No.	Portrait	Chief of the General Staff	Took office	Left office	Time in office	Defence branch	Ref.
1	Nikolai Churkin	Lieutenant General; Nikolai Churkin (born 1949)	1992	1994	1–2 years	Belarusian Ground Forces	-
2	Leonid Maltsev	Lieutenant General; Leonid Maltsev (born 1949)	1994	1995	0–1 years	Belarusian Ground Forces	-
3	Aleksandr Chumakov	Lieutenant General; Aleksandr Chumakov (born 1941)	1995	1996	0–1 years	Belarusian Ground Forces	-
4	Mikhail Kozlov [be]	Lieutenant General; Mikhail Kozlov (born 1949)	1997	2001	3–4 years	Belarusian Ground Forces	-
5	Sergey Gurulyov [be]	Lieutenant General; Sergey Gurulyov (born 1953)	2001	2009	7–8 years	Belarusian Ground Forces	-
6	Pyotr Tihonovsky [be]	Major General; Pyotr Tihonovsky (born 1958)	2009	11 January 2014	4–5 years	Belarusian Ground Forces	-
7	Oleg Belokonev	Major General; Oleg Belokonev (born 1965)	11 January 2014	20 January 2020	6 years, 9 days	Belarusian Ground Forces	
8	Alexander Volfovich	Major General; Alexander Volfovich (born 1967)	20 January 2020	11 March 2021	1 year, 50 days	Belarusian Ground Forces	
9	Viktor Gulevich	Major General; Viktor Gulevich (born 1969)	11 March 2021	10 May 2024	3 years, 60 days	Belarusian Ground Forces	
10	Pavel Muraveiko	Major General; Pavel Muraveiko (born 1971)	23 May 2024	28 September 2026	5 years, 201 days	Belarusian Ground Forces	
11	Uladzimir Bely	Major General; Uladzimir Bely (born 1977)	28 September 2026	Incumbent	54 days	Belarusian Ground Forces	
