= 231st =

231st may refer to:

- 231st Battalion (Seaforth Highlanders of Canada), CEF, a unit in the Canadian Expeditionary Force during the First World War
- 231st Combat Communications Squadron, a tenant unit of the 113th Wing based at Andrews Air Force Base, Maryland, USA
- 231st Infantry Brigade, the Allied codename for the centre invasion beach during the World War II Allied invasion of Normandy, 6 June 1944

== See also ==
- 231 (number)
- 231st Street (IRT Broadway – Seventh Avenue Line), a local station on the IRT Broadway – Seventh Avenue Line of the New York City Subway
- 231, the year 231 (CCXXXI) of the Julian calendar
