= General Staff of the Armed Forces of Belarus =

Military staff of the Armed Forces of Belarus

General Staff of the Armed Forces
- Генеральны штаб Узброеных Сіл Рэспублікі Беларусь; Генеральный штаб Вооружённых сил Республики Беларусь
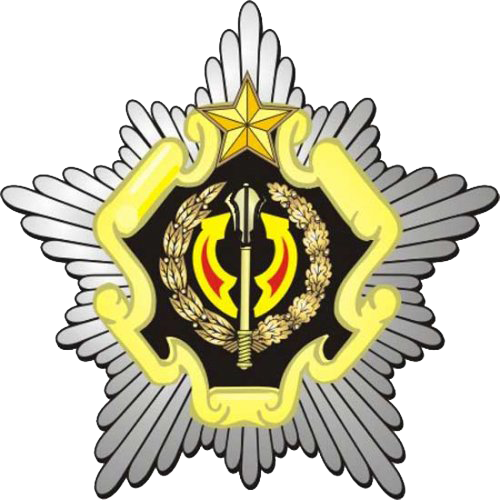
- General Staff emblem

- Official flag

Agency overview
- Formed: May 1992
- Preceding agency: General Staff of the Armed Forces of the Soviet Union (1946–1991)
- Headquarters: Minsk, Belarus
- Minister responsible: Lt. Gen. Viktor Khrenin, Minister of Defense
- Agency executive: Maj. Gen. Pavel Muraveiko, Chief of the General Staff
- Parent agency: Ministry of Defense
- Website: www.mil.by

The General Staff of the Armed Forces of the Republic of Belarus is the central body of military management and operational control of the Armed Forces of Belarus. The Chief of the General Staff is appointed by the President of Belarus, who is the Supreme Commander-in-Chief of the Armed Forces. The General Staff is part of the Ministry of Defence of Belarus.

The General Staff was established originally as the Main Staff in May 1992, when the Byelorussian Military District of the Soviet Union was dissolved.

The current Chief of the General Staff is Pavel Muraveiko, who also serves as First Deputy Minister of Defence.

== Structure ==
The following departments are under the control of the general staff:

- Main Operations Directorate
- Main Intelligence Directorate
- Main Organizational Mobilization Directorate
- Main Ideology Directorate
- Main Policy Directorate
- Information-Analytical Department
- Department of Communications
- Department of Territorial Defense
- Department of Missile Forces and Artillery
- Department of the Engineering Troops
- Financial Department
- Department of Electronic Warfare
- Department of Radiation, Chemical and Biological Protection
- Navigational and Topographical Department
