= 6th Guards Kiev-Berlin Mechanised Brigade =

Belarusian military formation

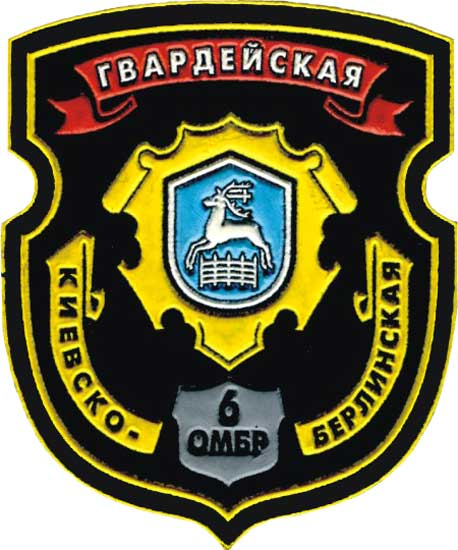
- Active: 1992–present
- Country: Belarus (1992–present)
- Branch: Belarusian Ground Forces (1992–present)
- Type: Mechanized brigade
- Role: Armored warfare
- Size: Brigade
- Garrison/HQ: Grodno
- Engagements: World War II; Cold War
- Decorations: Order of the Red Banner; Order of Suvorov 2nd class
- Battle honours: Kiev-Berlin

The 6th Separate Guards Mechanised Kiev-Berlin Order of Lenin, Red Banner, Orders of Suvorov and Bogdan Khmelnitsky Brigade (6 omechbr) is a formation of the Armed Forces of the Republic of Belarus. Its Military Unit Number is 05733.

== History ==
The brigade traces its history to the formation of the 12th Tank Corps, formed in May 1942. By NKO Prikaz No. 0404s of 26 July 1943, the corps was "ranged among the Guards" as the 6th Guards Tank Corps. It fought in the Lvov–Sandomierz Offensive of 1944.

After the Second World War ended, on July 10, 1945, in accordance with directive of the Supreme Command Headquarters (Stavka VGK) No. 11096 of May 29, 1945, the 6th Guards Tank Corps became part of the Central Group of Forces. On the basis of the order of the NKO USSR No. 0013 of June 10, 1945 the famous 6th Guards Tank Corps was reorganised as the 6th Guards Tank Kiev-Berlin Order of Lenin, Red Banner, Orders of Suvorov and Bogdan Khmelnitsky Division (Military Unit 36231) of the 3rd Guards Tank Army. It arrived in Wittenberg in the German Democratic Republic in 1949.

On December 5, 1989, within the framework of Gorbachev's "unilateral withdrawal of Soviet troops", the 6th Guards Tank Division of the Soviet Ground Forces was withdrawn from Wittenberg. Since 1992, the 6th Guards Tank Division, formed on the basis of the 6th Guards Tank Corps has been a part of the Armed Forces of the Republic of Belarus. On August 1, 1992, the formation was renamed the 6th Separate Guards Mechanized Brigade with the preservation of its honorary titles and military orders.

A new headquarters building for the brigade was opened in Grodno in 2015.

The brigade participated in the "Neman-2001", "Berezina-2002", "Clear Sky - 2003", "Shield of the Fatherland - 2004", "Autumn-2008" exercises, integrated operational exercises in 2005 and 2007, complex operational and tactical exercise "Union Shield - 2006", operational and strategic exercise "West-2009", joint operational exercise of the armed forces of the Republic of Belarus and the Russian Federation "Union Shield - 2011", joint strategic exercise Armed Forces of the Republic of Belarus and the Russian Federation "West-2013".
