= Belarusian Ground Forces =

Land forces of Belarus

- Сухапутныя войскі Рэспублікі Беларусь; Сухопутные войска Республики Беларусь
- Emblem of the Belarusian Ground Forces
- Founded: 20 March 1992
- Country: Belarus
- Role: Land warfare
- Size: 18,000 (2024)
- Part of: Defence Ministry of Belarus; Armed Forces of Belarus
- Headquarters: Minsk
- Nicknames: Belarusian Land Forces; Belarusian Army
- Colors: Red
- Anniversaries: February 23

Commanders
- Commander-in-chief: Alexander Lukashenko
- Chief of the General Staff: Major General Pavel Muraveiko

Insignia
- Flag

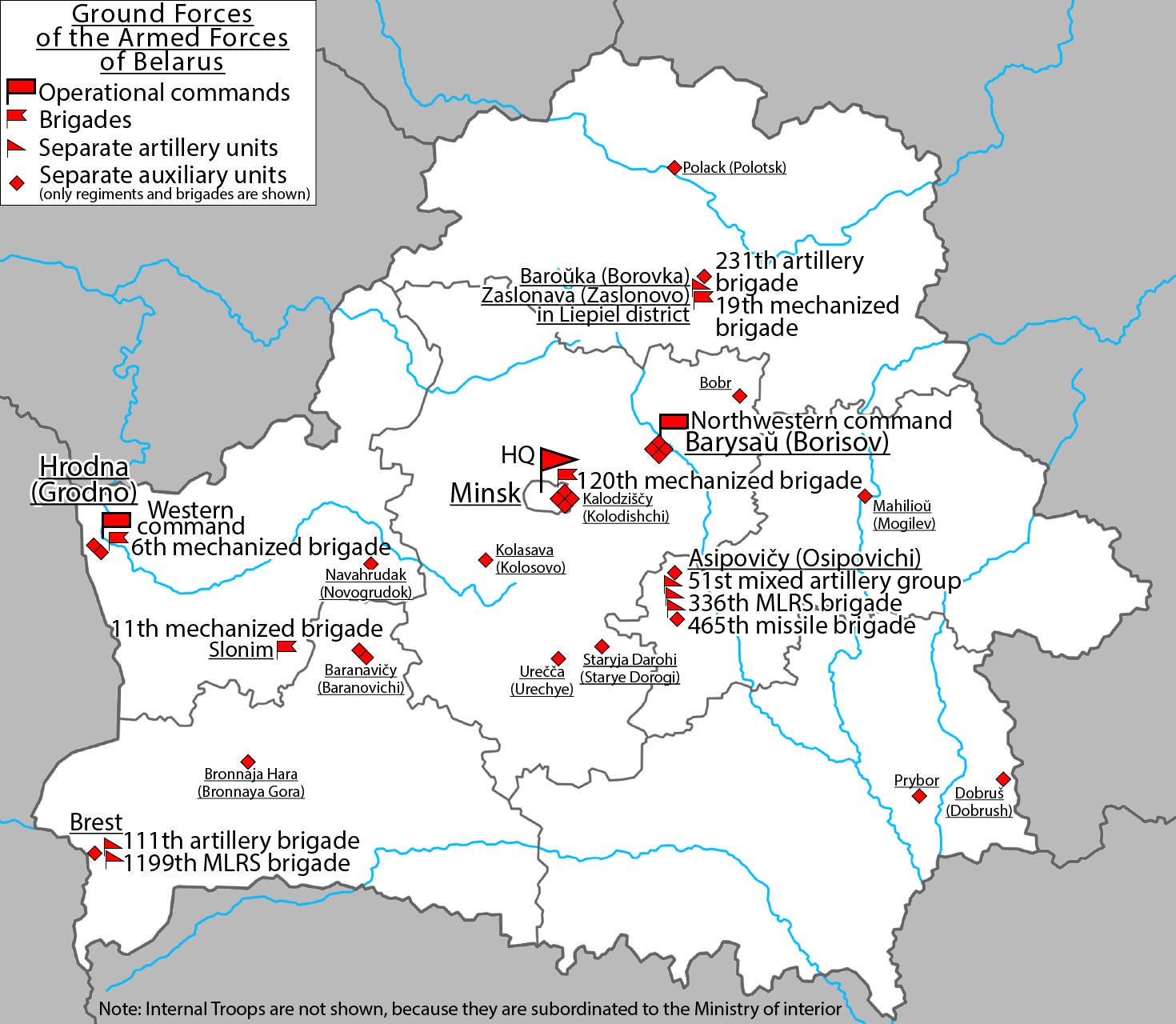
A map showing the main military units of the Belarusian Ground Forces

The Belarusian Ground Forces, (Note: Belarusian: Сухапутныя войскі Рэспублікі Беларусь, Russian: Сухопутные войска Республики Беларусь, lit. 'Ground Forces of the Republic of Belarus') also called the Belarusian army, is the land warfare service branch of the Armed Forces of Belarus.

Since the abolition of the Main Staff of the Ground Forces in 2012, the three regional operational commands of the Ground Forces have been directly subordinated to the General Staff of the Armed Forces of Belarus, and all ground maneuver units are part of the operational commands. In peacetime the units are maintained at half-strength, and Belarus conducts regular training of its reservists in both infantry roles and with advanced equipment, with a significant part of the military budget being used for maintaining the capability for the mobilization of reserves.

The Ground Forces do not carry out operational or strategic level exercises without participation from the Russian Armed Forces. Together with the Belarusian Special Operations Forces, the Ground Forces of Belarus form a Regional Group of Forces with the Russian 1st Guards Tank Army. The Special Operations Forces Command, just as the operational commands of the Ground Forces, is subordinated to the General Staff.

== History ==
The ground forces were founded on March 20, 1992, on the same day the Defence Ministry of Belarus was established. By 1994, the ground forces had over 50,000 troops, most being former soldiers of the Soviet Army's Belorussian Military District. The army equipment which was used at the time included 79 T-54s, 639 T-55s, 291 T-62s, 299 T-64s, 8 T-80s, and 1,800 T-72s.

In December 2001, the Ground Forces underwent a major reorganization which produced two operational-territorial commands which are similar to Russia's military districts. The two commands that were formed from this reorganization were the Western Operational Command at Grodno, and the North Western Operational Command, at Barysaw. At around the same time, the headquarters of the Ground Forces was established on the basis of the former 5th Guards Tank Army. The ground forces headquarters was abolished during reorganization in 2011 and replaced by combat training and territorial defense directorates. The change further confirmed the Belarusian Ground Forces integration into the Russian military command structure as Belarus thus does not independently plan or conduct large-scale exercises and operates under Russian command during joint exercises. As of mid-2021 the units of the operational commanders were manned at half strength, making them unready for rapid response combat operations.

== Structure ==
=== Headquarters (Minsk) ===
- Headquarters of the Armed Forces
- Exemplary Military Band
- Honor Guard of the Armed Forces of Belarus
- 465th Missile Brigade
- 336th Rocket Artillery Brigade
- 51st Guards Mixed Artillery Group
- 188th Engineer Brigade
- 52nd Specialized Search Battalion
- Cynological Center of the Armed Forces

=== Western Operational Command ===
- 6th Guards Kiev-Berlin Mechanised Brigade
- 11th Guards Berlin-Carpathian Mechanised Brigade
- 111th Artillery Brigade
- 1199th Mixed Artillery Regiment
- 557th Engineering Brigade
- 74th Separate Communications Regiment
- 815th Maintenance Center
- 28th Storage Base
- 48th Separate Electronic Warfare Battalion
- 230th Combined-Arms Training Ground
- 117th Navigation and Topographic Unit
- 250th Separate Guard and Service Battalion
- 108th Material Support Brigade

=== North Western Operational Command ===
- 120th Guards Mechanised Brigade
- 19th Guards Mechanized Brigade
- 231st Artillery Brigade
- 86th Communications Brigade
- 42nd Separate Radio Engineering Battalion
- 244th Center for Electronic Intelligence
- 7th Engineer Regiment
- 60th Separate Communications Regiment
- 814th Maintenance Center
- 34th Storage Base
- 37th Guards Weapons and Equipment Storage Base
- 110th Separate Logistics Regiment
- 10th Separate Electronic Warfare Battalion
- 227th Combined-Arms Training Ground
- 22nd Missile Brigade.
- 51st Guards Artillery Brigade
- 72nd Guards Joint Training Centre

== Specialized forces ==
The specialized forces are designed to support the combat activities of the Ground Forces and solve their inherent tasks. They include formations and military units of intelligence, communications, engineering, radiation, chemical and biological defense, electronic warfare, navigation and topographic.

- Electronic Warfare Troops
- Signal Troops
- Engineer Troops
- NBC Protection Troops
- Topographic Navigation Service

=== Signals Troops ===
The Signal Troops are separate special forces that act as the communications system between troops in the Armed Forces and territorial troops. It is grounded in communications and command and control equipment, radio intelligence and special radio equipment communication. The official holiday of the Signal Troops is 20 October, which was the day in 1919 when the Department of Communications of the Red Army was formed. Over the course of post-war years, with the transition of the troops to a peaceful situation, the communications troops of the Belarusian Military District, and later the Armed Forces of the Republic of Belarus, took measures to restore and develop the stationary communications system, deploy communication systems of garrisons and military camps, and conditions. In 2019, the Ministry of Communications and Informatization commemorated its centennial with a holiday stamp.

=== NBC Protection Troops ===
The Nuclear, Biological and Chemical Protection Troops (Russian: Войска радиационной, химической и биологической защиты; Войска РХБ защиты)) are the forces designed to endure their combat tasks in conditions of radioactive, chemical and biological contamination, For about ten years, as part of a limited contingent of Soviet Army, chemical troops fought in Afghanistan, where such chemical support tasks as the use of flamethrowing incendiary agents and aerosols were effective in combating rebels. Many representatives of the chemical troops participating in the war were awarded military orders and medals.

In the course of eliminating the consequences of the Chernobyl disaster, given the training and technical equipment of the chemical forces, they were assigned some of the most difficult work. The Department of Chemical Forces was created on 1 June 1992 on the basis of the disbanded Directorate of the Belarusian Military District and was included in the General Staff of the Armed Forces. On 21 December 2001, in connection with the creation of the General Staff of the Armed Forces of the Republic of Belarus, the department of chemical forces of the Main Headquarters of the Armed Forces was reorganized and included in it as a department of the Republican Chemical Chemistry for Protection and Ecology of the General Staff of the Armed Forces.

== Commanders of the Ground Forces ==
- Major General Alexander Nikitin (6 July 2006 – 17 April 2012)

The post of commander of the Ground Forces was abolished in 2012 when the Ground Forces Command was disbanded.
