= LI Corps =

LI Corps or 51st Corps may refer to:

- 51st Corps (German Empire)
- LI Army Corps, Wehrmacht, Germany
- LI Mountain Corps, Wehrmacht, Germany
- 51st Air Defence Corps, Russia
- 51st Rifle Corps, Soviet Union

== See also ==
- List of military corps by number
- 51st Army (disambiguation)
- 51st Brigade (disambiguation)
- 51st Division (disambiguation)
- 51st Regiment (disambiguation)
- 51st Squadron (disambiguation)
- 51st (disambiguation)
