= Svislach, Mogilev region =

Agrotown in Mogilev Region, Belarus

Svislach Сьвіслач (Belarusian)
- Agrotown
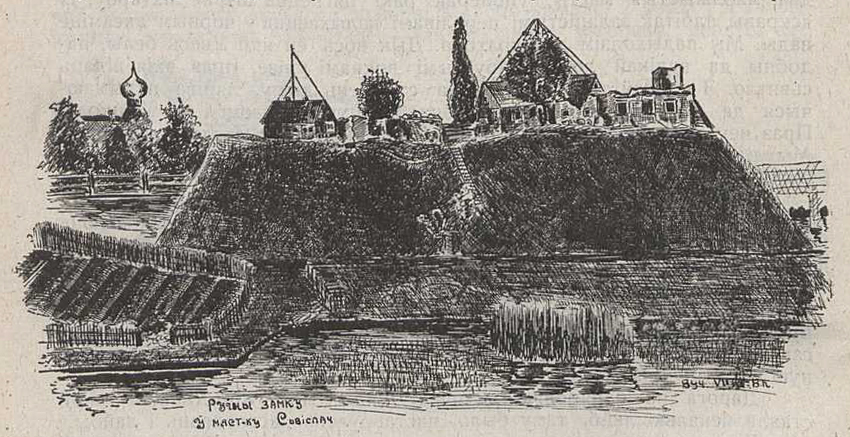
- Svislach castle, 1928

- Location within Belarus
- Coordinates: 53°26′10″N 28°58′21″E
- Country: Belarus
- Region: Mogilev Region
- District: Asipovichy District

Population (2010)
  - Total: 678
- Time zone: UTC+3 (MSK)
- Postal code: 213714
- Area code: +375 2235

Svislach (Belarusian: Сьвіслач; Russian: Свислочь, romanized: Svisloch; Yiddish: סוויסלאָוויטש, romanized: Svislovitsh) is an agrotown in Asipovichy District, Mogilev Region, Belarus. It serves as the administrative center of Svislach selsoviet. It is located on the confluence of the Svislach River, which is also its namesake. Svislach is located near the cities of Asipovichy and Babruysk. In 2010, its population was 678.

Prior to the destruction of the Jewish community during the Holocaust, it was home to a plurality Jewish population.

== History ==
Svislach has been inhabited since at least the 12th century, and was formerly part of the Polotsk Principality of the Early East Slav cultures.

=== Under the Grand Duchy of Lithuania ===
Svislach was the former capital of the Svislach principality of the Polish-Lithuanian Commonwealth. It was the sight of the Svislach Castle, a wooden baroque monument with a moat and rampart, which was originally built in the 12th century, was destroyed and rebuilt, until it was demolished by Soviet authorities. In the 14th century work, List of Russian Cities, Near and Far, Svislach is listed among the castles of Lithuania. In 1506, the town was destroyed by Tatars, and again in 1535 by invaders from Moscow.

In the mid-16th century, Svislach became the property of Lithuanian nobleman Lukas Garaburdov. In the 1565 territorial reform, it became a part of the Minsk Voivodeship. In the Russo-Polish War of 1654, it captured various Cossack territory. In 1705, a Franciscan Monastery was founded in the town. Throughout the 17th century, Svislach was under control of the Radziwill family.

=== Under Russian sovereignty ===
Following the Second Partition of Poland in 1793, Svislach fell under Russian jurisdiction. It became part of the Bobruisk Uezd in the Minsk Governorate. In 1886, there were 47 households, 2 churches, and 2 schools in the village.

During WWI, the village was occupied by German troops in February of 1918.

Under the Third Constituent Charter, Svislach was declared part of the Belarusian People's Republic following the collapse of the Russian Empire. In 1919, it became part of the Belarusian SSR.

== Jewish community ==
The first evidence showing Jews living in Svisloch was back in 1717, when documents showed that the Jews of the town paid taxes to the government. By 1766, about 100 Jews lived in the town.

By 1897, the town reached its maximum Jewish population, with 1,120 Jews accounting for 62% of the population. In 1923, there were 831 Jews, and in 1926, there were 742 Jews, 41% of the town's population.

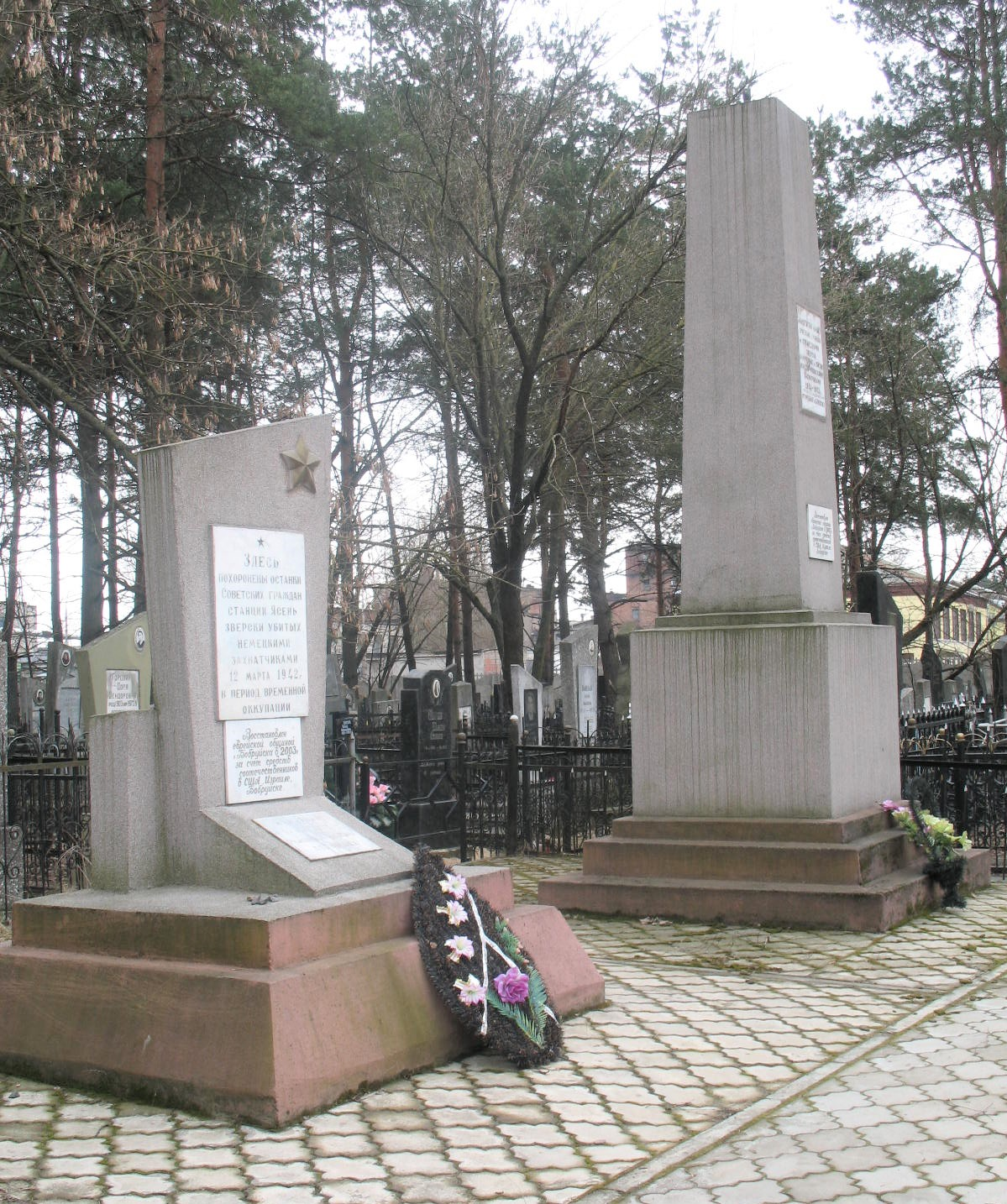
Svislach and Yasen Ghetto Memorial in Babruysk

=== The Holocaust ===
In 1941, the village fell under Nazi control during Operation Barbarossa, and the Jews were ordered to wear the yellow Jude patch, but the town did not have a ghetto for Jews at the time. In the summer, the Germans took a dozen Jews outside of the town's borders, and murdered them in the Berezina riverbank.

On October 8, a group of Jews from Svislach and neighboring Yalizava^{[be]} were taken to the Virkau forest between the villages of Virkau and Lianiuka, and were murdered in a killing pit. On October 14, the remaining Jews in the town were rounded up and were brought to the same forest, and also murdered in the killing pit. The total number of victims among the Jews of Svisloch is unknown, but about 200 are accounted for in various records. In 2018, the diary of a gentile resident of the town was found from WWII, in which it was stated that over 1,000 Jews were murdered, but this figure contradicts evidence about the size of the Jewish community at the time.

A few Jews from the community managed to survive the Holocaust in different ways, and some returned to the village following the end of WWII, but did not maintain a Jewish community. After the war, a monument was erected in the city of Bobruisk in memory of the massacred Jews.

== Modern times ==
Svislach is the site of local pediatric medical tourism, with one of the largest children's sanitoriums in the region.

In the 2000s, Swislach received the official status of agrotown. In 2001, there were 277 households, and that number expanded to 314 by 2007.

== Demography ==
Historical population
Year	1886	1890	1999	2001	2007	2010
Pop.	420	1,000	852	820	760	678
±%	—	+138.1%	−14.8%	−3.8%	−7.3%	−10.8%

== Gallery ==
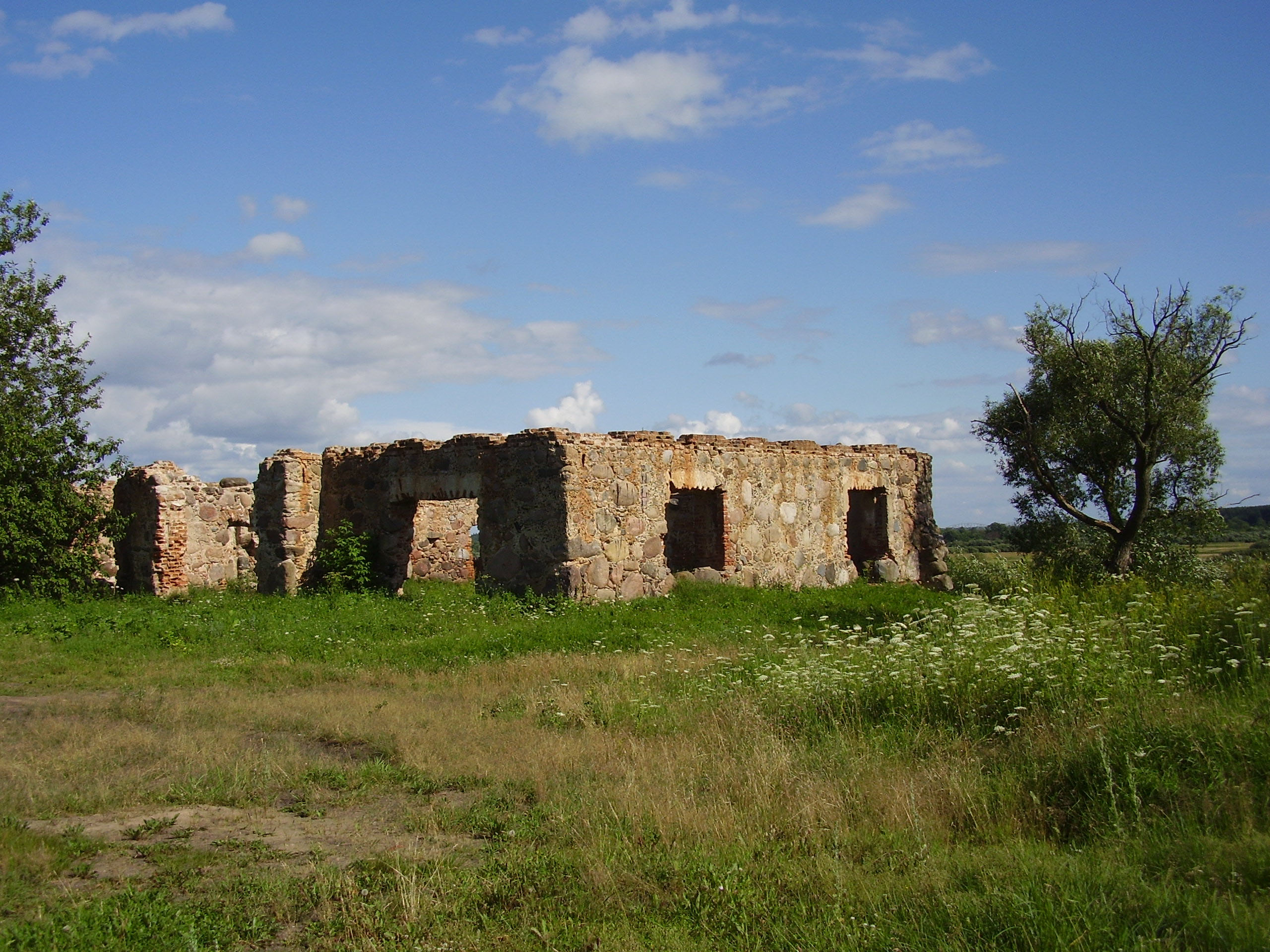

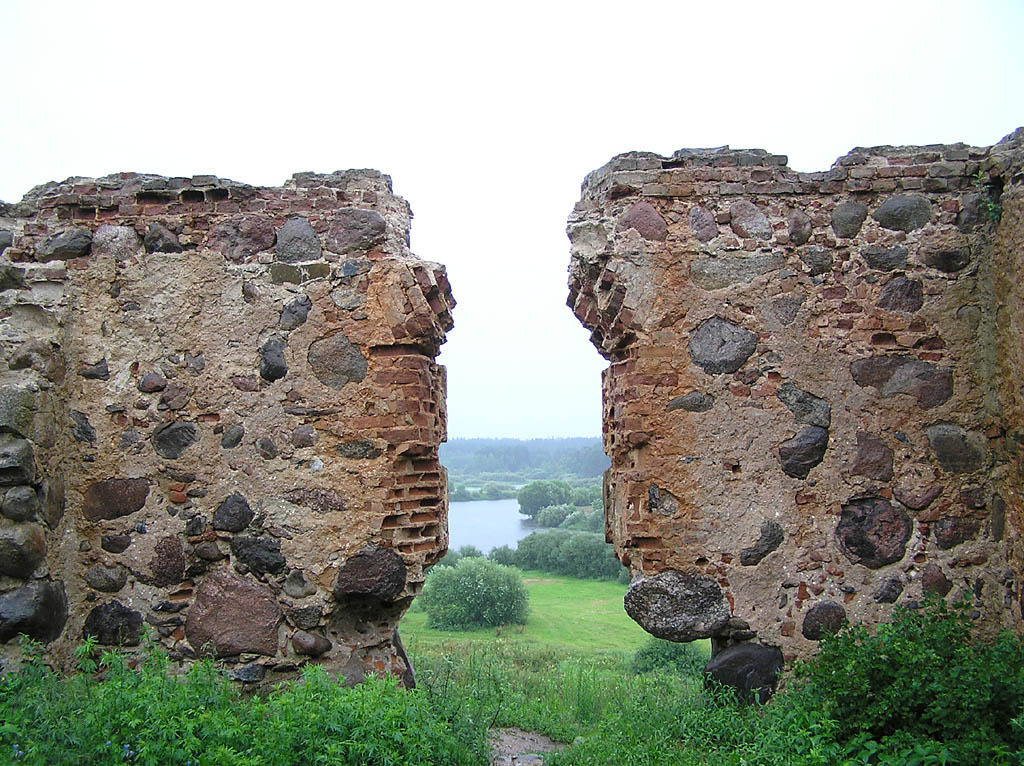

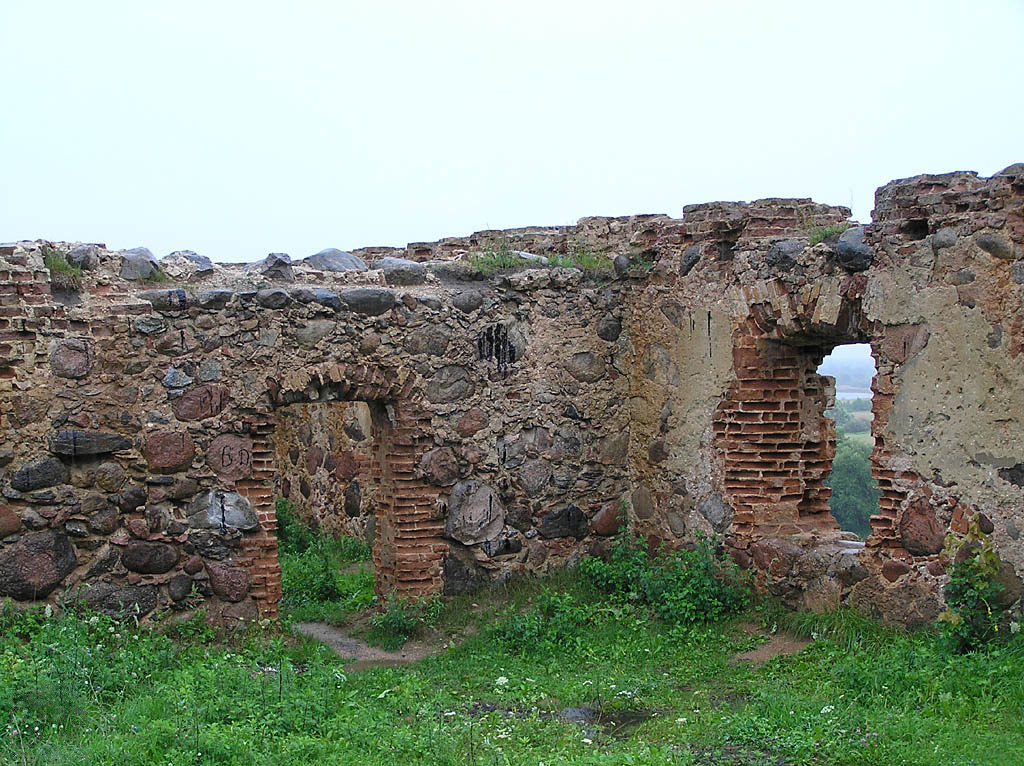

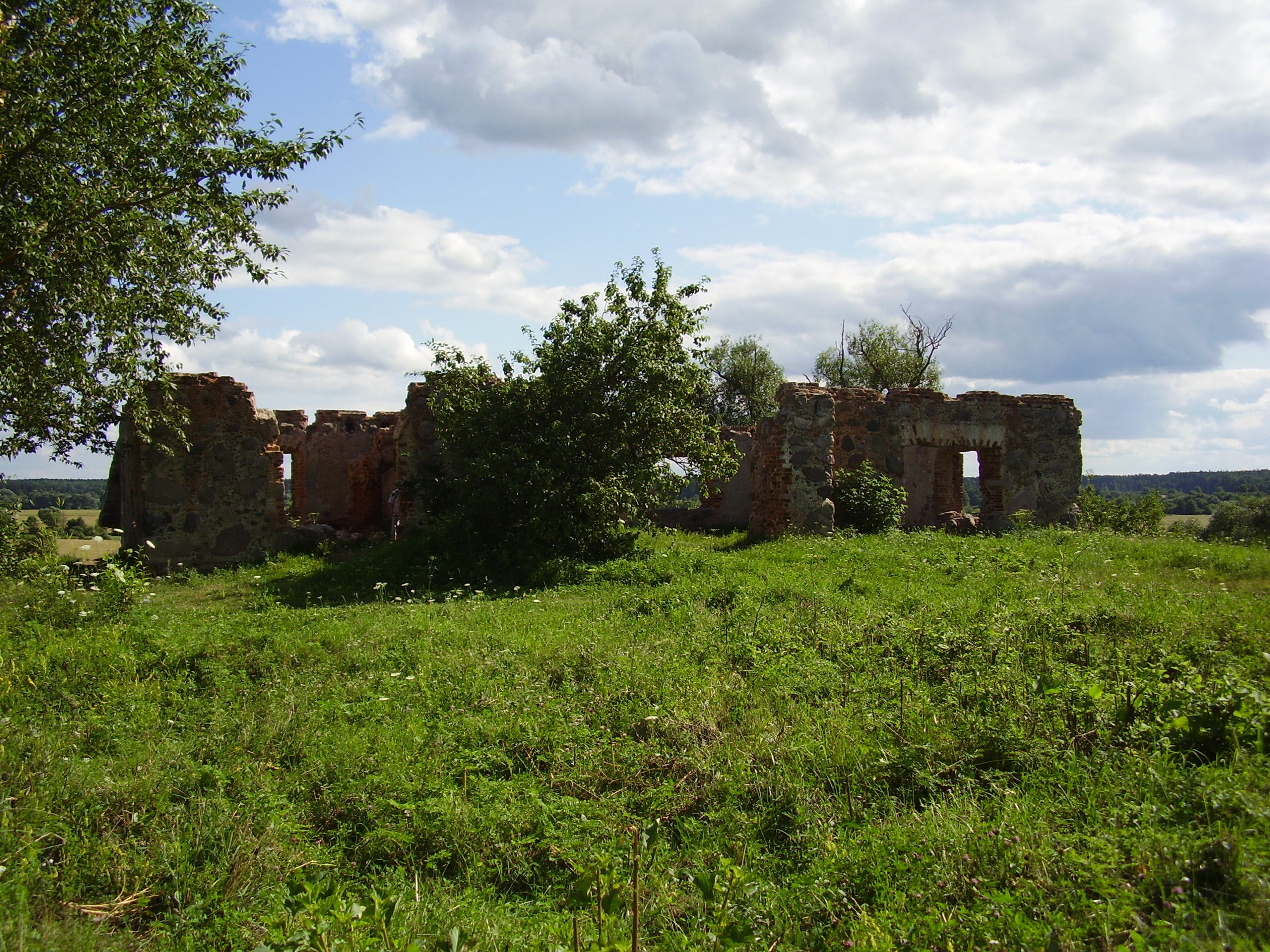
