= Tsel, Asipovichy district =

Village in Mogilev Region, Belarus

Tsel Цэль (Belarusian) Цель (Russian)
- Village
- Location within Belarus
- Coordinates: 53°23′41″N 28°27′25″E
- Country: Belarus
- Region: Mogilev Region
- District: Asipovichy District
- Time zone: UTC+3 (MSK)

Tsel (Belarusian: Цэль, romanized: Ceĺ; Russian: Цель) is a village in Asipovichy District, Mogilev Region, Belarus. It is administratively part of Pratasevichy selsoviet. It is situated on the Svislach River, roughly 20 km (12 miles) northwest of Asipovichy and 90 km (56 miles) southeast of Minsk.

The village includes a primary and secondary school and is the location of dachas of Minsk and Asipovichy residents.

== History ==
Tsel, whose name literally means "target", was founded as a military base of the Red Army in 1936. A missile battalion from Klintsy was based in Tsel during the Soviet period. When the 22nd Missile Brigade relocated from Hungary to Belarus, it took over the base at Tsel. A village was built to house the families of the servicemen; servicemen and their families together numbered 1,500. The 465th Missile Brigade took over the base when the 22nd Brigade was disbanded in 2005. The base was abandoned in 2018 after the 465th relocated to the Yuzhny military base on the outskirts of Asipovichy. In early June 2023 refurbishment efforts began at the base, identified by analysts as efforts to house Russian troops.
