= 51st =

51st is the ordinal form of the number 51. 51st or Fifty-first may also refer to:

- A fraction, 1/51, equal to one of 51 equal parts
- The 51st, nonprofit local news website registered in the District of Columbia

== Geography ==
- 51st meridian east, a line of longitude
- 51st meridian west, a line of longitude
- 51st parallel north, a circle of latitude
- 51st parallel south, a circle of latitude
- 51st station, on the Chicago Transit Authority's "L" system
- 51st state

== Military ==
- 51st Army (disambiguation)
- 51st Brigade (disambiguation)
- 51st Division (disambiguation)
- 51st Regiment (disambiguation)
- 51st Squadron (disambiguation)

== Other ==
- 51st century
- 51st century BC

== See also ==
- 51 (disambiguation)
