= Anatoly Rubin =

Israeli holocaust survivor from Belarus (1927–2017)

- Hebrew: אנטולי רובין
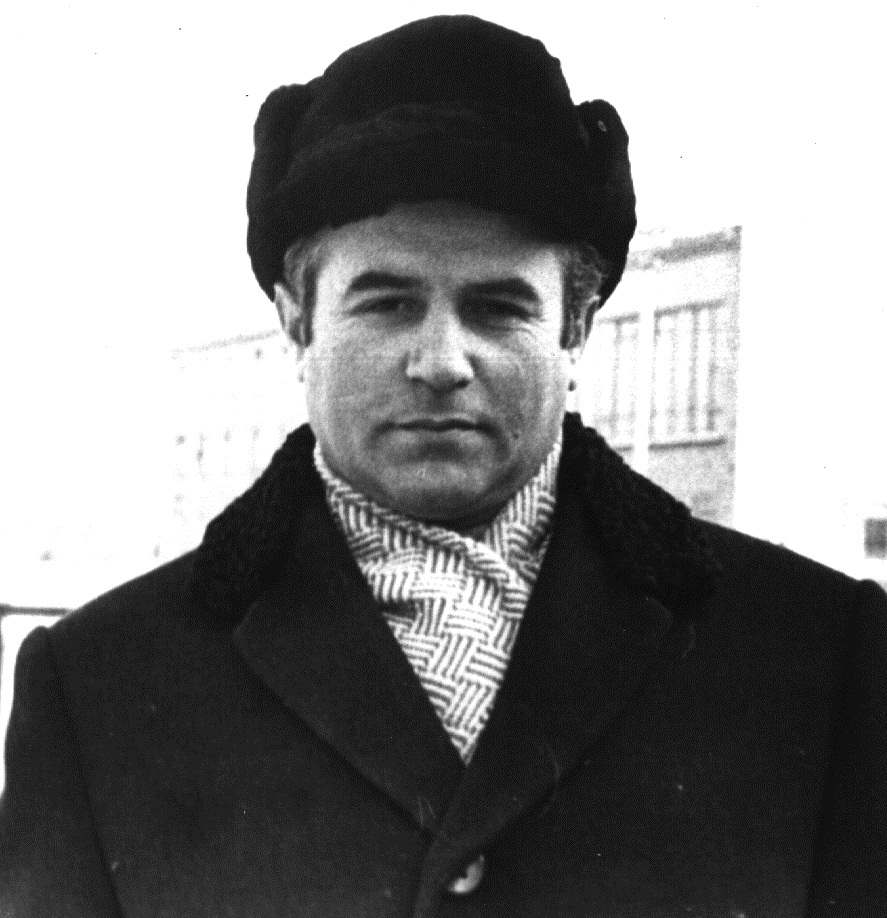
- Born: Anatoly Pinkhusovich Rubin; 29 January 1927; Minsk, Byelorussia, USSR
- Died: 16 January 2017 (aged 89); Jerusalem

Anatoly Pinkhusovich Rubin (Russian: Анатолий Пинхусович Рубин; 1927–2017) was an Israeli activist and Prisoner of Zion who survived the Holocaust and later the Gulags. Born in Minsk, he survived the German invasion of the USSR, narrowly escaping the liquidation of the Minsk Ghetto. After the war, he spent six years imprisoned in Siberian Gulag forced labor camps for distributing books sympathetic to Zionism. After being under investigation by the KGB for spreading Zionist ideas, he immigrated to Israel in 1969. Once there, he campaigned for the Israeli government to assist others who wished to emigrate from the USSR to Israel. He also published memoirs of his earlier experiences.

== Biography ==
Rubin was born in Minsk, Byelorussia (later Belarus). His father was religiously observant, and his mother maintained some traditions out of respect for him. Rubin was more attracted to Russian role models than Jewish ones. In the summer of 1941, when the Wehrmacht invaded the Soviet Union by way of Minsk, Rubin was forced to join the stream of refugees fleeing deeper into Russia, and was strafed by the Luftwaffe. After two days, he reached the town of Smilovichi, some 35 km (22 mi) from Minsk. There he was reunited with his aunt and her young son. The three of them remained with a Jewish blacksmith, until the Germans occupied the town, preventing their plans to move further east. They were forced to return to occupied Minsk, where they found a second aunt along with his mother and two sisters. Rubin's father was at work away from home when the invasion occurred. Upon his return to Minsk, he was told his family had fled towards Moscow. He was later murdered by bandits while searching for his family.

In Minsk, as part of the German invasion, Nazi legislation caused displacement of Jews into the Minsk Ghetto. Rubin's family lived with two other families in two small rooms. They obtained their daily necessities at great risk from German sentries by bartering their aunt's belongings through the ghetto fence. Their situation was alleviated by his sister Tamara, whose Aryan looks allowed her to pass as a non-Jew.

In November 1941, the Germans began the liquidation of the ghetto. The residents, his family among them, were marched off to the killing pit. However, Rubin and his older sister Tamara managed to escape. Tamara joined the partisans and he fled to the 'Aryan' part of the town where, beset by the hatred and physical abuse by the locals, he tried to survive. In the end, he returned to the ghetto, where he lived at first with aunts and worked on forced labor crews.

In March 1942, as his labor crew was filing back into the ghetto they were halted by SS men who were implementing a round of selektion. He was narrowly able to escape back to the ghetto where some of the remaining residents provided a cellar for him to hide in. The next day, he returned to his own house. By day, he continued to work on the forced labor crews, since laborers were fed 30 grams of bread and a ladle of soup for their efforts. By July 1942, the majority of the ghetto's Jews had been murdered.

Before the ghetto was finally liquidated on 21 October 1943, a German woman who had worked as a maid at his school smuggled Rubin out to relatives of her husband in an outlying village. He succeeded by using Aryan papers that he had received from another friend, also a local ethnic German. Rubin was now able to live and work in the village as a non-Jew, doing farm work and cow-herding. Partisans, suspecting he was a German spy, almost killed him. (Note: Later he learned that the partisans had betrayed his sister to the Germans, who tortured and then killed her.)

In the spring of 1944, the Red Army liberated his village. He destroyed his Russian papers and returned to Minsk, where he discovered that not a single member of his family remained alive. His attempts to enlist in the Red Army were refused on the grounds of him being underage. Instead he enrolled in a trade school, which provided bed, board and employment.

=== First incarceration ===
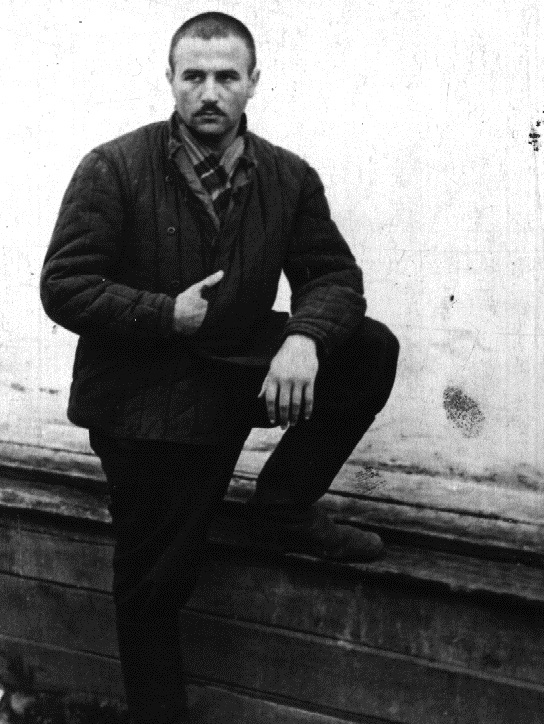
Anatoly Rubin in a forced labor camp in Mordovia, 1962

Rubin was sent by the local boxing federation to take part in a national exhibition of physical culture in Red Square in Moscow. On his return (14 November 1946), he was arrested and jailed for abandoning a military facility. A military court sentenced him to five years of 're-education' in a labor camp for his 'nationalist' (i.e. Zionist) views, his unhealthy opinions about the Soviet regime, and his destructive influence on local youth.

Life in prison was oppressive. There was a significant class gap between the 'regular' and the criminal prisoners. The latter carried on their own terror regime, and effectively ruled prison life. Rubin instigated an uprising against them. He was transferred to a labor camp. The regime at these camps was a combination of hunger, physical abuse and hard forced labor. A niece heard of his imprisonment and sought his release. She eventually reached a top-ranking general who ordered a review of his case. His sentence was changed to a twelve-month probation. Back in Minsk, he entered The Institute of Physical Culture, which provided generous stipends, larger food rations and even an array of sportswear. His boxing studies were successful. He won fight after fight and steadily built up his physical strength, further motivated by the fact that he could now effectively defend himself against anti-Semitic attacks, which came from many directions.

=== Awakening of national identity ===
The ongoing anti-Semitism Rubin encountered from local Russians steadily fashioned his Jewishness. He came to understand that he was unwelcome in Russia, and if he was ever to have a home it could only be in the State of Israel. He now devoted all of his energy and resources toward that goal.

In 1955, while in Riga for a boxing tournament, he first encountered Jews who observed Jewish customs, holidays and traditions. As Soviet rule in Latvia only dated from the Second World War, Jewish activists, especially in Beitar, were still open and active. Well-stocked Jewish libraries were also available. Determined to expand his Jewish knowledge upon his return, he discovered written material of Jewish interest in the central library. He studied and began to openly refer to material in his conversations concerning the ubiquitous Russian hatred of Jews. Young Minsk Jews were also interested in Gromyko's and Cherepakhin's speeches about the establishment of the new state of Israel, with which Russia then enjoyed warm relations. Rubin would push to awaken their interest in Jewish life and in the State of Israel. In 1956 he first encountered foreign tourists. He also described to them what it was like to be a Jew in the USSR, with its constant waves of anti-Semitism. He asked them to relay this to the United States and Israel. All of these conversations were recorded by the KGB.

In 1957, a World Festival of Youth and Students was held in Moscow. Rubin, along with Jews from throughout Russia, approached the Israeli delegation. These Soviet Jews surrounded the Israelis and could not stop asking them questions. He photographed the delegation and the Israeli flag. Rubin met the delegation head to obtain material for the Jewish youth in Minsk. Since the delegation was being monitored by the KGB, the exchange of material could not take place. He still managed to accumulate a significant quantity of literature, which he used extensively in Minsk. His enthusiasm for Jewish things led him to ignore the rules of caution.

=== Interrogation, investigation and trial ===
The KGB was closing in, and he was arrested. He refused to incriminate those who shared in his Jewish activities, and he managed to dispose of secret information that was on his person. At interrogation it became apparent that the KGB had amassed detailed and accurate information on him and on his friends and relatives. After his trial, one of his relatives told him that a listening device had been hidden in the attic above his apartment. Evidence obtained by bugging and photographing was not admissible in a court of law, and he believed that this legality would be observed. Yet, the greater part of the charges brought against him were based precisely on this "inadmissible evidence". Despite the various 'methods' of interrogation employed against him, Rubin did not reveal information.

The official list of the charges was treason, attempted assassination of a senior party leader and government minister (in this case, the Soviet premier, Nikita Khrushchev), anti-Soviet propaganda, dissemination of Zionist literature, ties with the Israeli embassy and the inflaming of nationalist passions. Two weeks into his interrogation a new investigator arrived whose assignment was to persuade Rubin to denounce Israeli embassy staff for conducting subversive activities under the guise of diplomatic activity. Rubin refused and no further attempt was ever made to recruit him.

Two others had been arrested along with Rubin. One was the wrestling champion of the Minsk republic, to whom Jewish refugees from Minsk had given Israeli literature, along with a sealed package to take back to Rubin. The wrestler did as he was asked, without checking to see what he was carrying. Both Rubin and the wrestler told this to the interrogators, even though they had not coordinated their testimony. Rubin's second co-accused was a doctor, the son of a veteran communist with long years of underground activity to his credit, including interest in Zionism. Rubin had viewed him as a potential ally and gave him material which the doctor distributed. Once arrested, he broke immediately, writing a letter of confession and penitence, and placed all the blame on Rubin. Rubin accepted all responsibility for acts which had been proved against the doctor. He explained that he adopted this course of action, because in his eyes the issue was not his own actions but his conviction that all three of the accused were perceived to be representatives of Zionist Jewry. For this reason, he declared it was important to him that he retain his dignity, proving once and for all that Jews were people of steadfast principle, and neither cowards nor traitors.

The most dangerous of the charges against him was that of attempted assassination of Premier Khrushchev, since that carried the death penalty. He was endlessly questioned on this point, and had persisted in his absolute denials. He refused to accept the court-appointed defense lawyer to defend him, preferring to defend himself. Nevertheless, the court appointed a defense attorney, the chairman of the Byelorussian bar. The trial lasted for more than five months (from 8 December 1958 to 29 April 1959), four of which he was held in solitary confinement. The treason charge was dropped during the interrogation. The KGB's file No.19121-s about the trial and the sentence is stored in Minsk.

The proceedings were carried out behind closed doors to prevent them from being used by Rubin for advancement of his ideas. He pleaded not guilty to all the charges in contrast with his co-defendants, who immediately pleaded guilty. He admitted that the literature found in his possession was his, however, he asserted that he did not regard the materials as being anti-Soviet. His court appointed lawyer admitted that he was guilty of grave crimes, although he endeavored to mitigate the verdict by recounting his life history: that during the war he had been held in a ghetto and orphaned at the age of 13; that the anti-Semitic Nazis had slaughtered his whole family, which accounted for his adult sensitivity to anti-Semitism; that brushes with a few anti-Semitic hooligans since then had left him over-sensitive, which Zionist propaganda had then exploited. Twenty witnesses testified at the trial. In his closing remarks, the prosecutor asked that Rubin be sentenced to five years re-education in a labor camp as the organizer of a criminal cell. The doctor was sentenced to two years and expulsion from the Communist Party and the wrestler to six months.

In his closing remarks, Rubin defended his actions, highlighted state-sanctioned anti-Semitism and the suppression of the Jews' national life. He declared his goal to leave for his homeland, Israel. His defense lawyer had assumed that he would not get more than three years. However, after Rubin's speech, the judges reconsidered and sentenced him to six years.

=== Return to the gulag ===
The KGB had spread the word that Rubin had planned to blow up the Minsk hotel; that he had been caught in the company of an agent who had given him information to take to the West; and that a half million roubles in foreign currency were found in his possession. Everything about the gulags was familiar there from his ten years before, except the majority of prisoners were now political internees. He was first sent to Lagpunkt 11, next to the Yaya train station. The inmate population was mostly Nazi war criminals ( e.g. Gestapo investigators). When asked what they were in for, their inevitable answer was, "Because of the Yids". During the last three years of his sentence (1962–1965), he was interned at Lagpunkt 10 where all prisoners wore striped overalls, were held in cells after work, and denied the 'privilege' of walking around the camp grounds. The rations were also several grades severer than in other camps.

Ten percent of the camp was composed of Jews, some of whom had been convicted of Zionist activism. They came from every corner of the Soviet Union. Rubin had thought that he was alone but, under his leadership, all the Jews in the camp were united and of one mind on Israel. They met to exchange information. Veteran Zionists shared history, culture and traditions. Some knew Hebrew and began giving lessons. They compiled their own small dictionaries by taking Russian primers and writing the Hebrew for each Russian word above it. They composed and learned by heart frequently used sentences. They celebrated every Jewish holiday. For this activity, which was forbidden both within the camp and in the USSR generally, they would gather in one of the clothing storerooms to hear one of the older inmates recite the prayers. As far as was possible they observed the commandments, and on Yom Kippur every one fasted, religious and secular alike. For them this was not only a religious observance, but a demonstration of national unity. They fashioned old silver coins into Magen David pendants, which they wore under their shirts. Collaboration was not tolerated. Among the Jewish political inmates there was an unwritten, iron-clad law that no one was to join any officially organized structure in any way. Anyone who did so was immediately totally ostracized.

Circumstances offered a prospect for his early release. The camp commandant informed him that as commandant, he had to draw up a prisoner assessment and he was included in a list of inmates who were willing to undertake "public activity". Upon hearing this, Rubin angrily demanded that his name be removed from this "blacklist". Two weeks later, the Prosecutor General informed him that he would never be eligible for commutation of his sentence. The KGB's file about those six years is in Moscow.

==== Leon Uris' Exodus ====
Prisoners made great efforts to obtain reading materials. One of the prisoners was a well-known writer who was allowed to receive books. He was friendly with many Jewish inmates and defended them against anti-Semitic assaults. He told Rubin that he had received a book in English called Exodus that he might find interesting. Other Jewish inmates immediately organized a group reading. Rubin had the book disguised as a Soviet textbook. The book was passed from hand to hand, and smuggled by Rubin in the transfers to other camps. In one of these camps, a Jew undertook its translation into Russian. Immediately upon its completion, Rubin had it smuggled out to the world beyond the camps. There, in samizdat form, it fulfilled a critical and formative role in the awakening the national consciousness of Soviet Jewry.

==== Release from the Gulag and return to Minsk ====
As the prospect of his release came closer, his health began to fail as a result of the endless stress of hunger rations, physical strain, and inhuman conditions. Throughout the spring of 1964, the inmates worked standing in pools of freezing melt-water, as a result, pain in his feet and legs built up until he could hardly sleep at night. His release date had been set for Tuesday, 8 December 1964. The camp authorities offered him an early release on condition that he sign an application for a pardon, which was effectively an admission of guilt, which he declined. Upon his release, he later said, "I was stepping out into the biggest prison camp of them all—the Soviet Union itself".

Rubin had friends in Moscow, Leningrad, Kiev, Riga and elsewhere. Friends introduced him into their circles. After four days in Moscow, he traveled to Minsk and then to Riga. He met with youth, attended the synagogue and visited Rumbula ravine where the Jews of Riga had been massacred during the Holocaust. When he left for the station, it was clear that the KGB was shadowing him. He boarded one coach and moved to another, certain that the KGB would be waiting for him in Minsk. The agent did not find him and decided that Rubin had eluded him. When he arrived at his Minsk apartment, a police agent appeared to record his address.

=== Zionist activity in Minsk and departure from Russia ===
Upon returning to Minsk, Rubin found himself unemployable. A month later, he was informed that the charges against him had been unfounded and he was fully rehabilitated. This was apparently a result of the fall of Khrushchev in October 1964. He was soon employed by the Minsk City Hospital as a senior physical exercise teacher. At the same time, he set up activities to teach the city's Jews about Judaism and the State of Israel. Soon he had created a cadre committed to Jewish national revival. Knowing that he was a KGB target, he was careful not to endanger them. He compartmentalized all those involved, and the lines of distribution of material. Several times it happened that someone would approach him and suggest, in absolute secrecy, that he give him a booklet to read that he himself had put into circulation. Ze'ev Jabotinsky's writings were especially popular. Rubin himself translated them into Russian and ensured there was a wide circulation.

To obtain material, Rubin traveled to other towns, where he had friends from the camps. To justify these visits, he took advantage of Soviet regulations that allowed anyone who donated blood to receive two days vacation. Rubin combined these with his regular, weekly day of rest, resulting in three-day trips away from Minsk. On a trip to Riga, he learned that the KGB was investigating him. He warned his contacts to dispose of anything incriminating. Almost every friend and contact of Rubin's was detained and questioned by the KGB. Finally, his own turn came. He decided to deny everything, because in Russia a 'no' always remained a 'no'. He was interrogated for five days, from morning to evening. On the sixth day, the agents confronted him with a friend, who it emerged had revealed everything he knew. Rubin violated the rules of interrogation by jumping up and declaring that everything was a lie. Faced with his refusal to admit anything, the chief interrogator closed the investigation against him.

Soon after, the authorities in Riga started issuing exit permits for Israel to selected Jews. He traveled to Riga and asked friends who had received permits to try to obtain an official invitation for him to emigrate once they reached Israel. Such an invitation did arrive and the OBIR registered the invitation. Rubin was summoned to OBIR and informed by its director: "You have been granted a travel permit. It's better you go to this Israel of yours than stay here poisoning the minds of Soviet youth." Rubin was the first Jew from Minsk to receive an emigration permit after the Six Day War. He was given twelve days to leave, during which time he traveled to bid farewell to friends. A large crowd came to the train station to see him off in person. There were speeches, and Israeli songs and dances. Many Jews sent him their names and addresses, asking that they too be sent an official invitation to make aliyah. They sent the message that Israel do all in its power to help them leave the Soviet Union.

=== Immigration to Israel ===
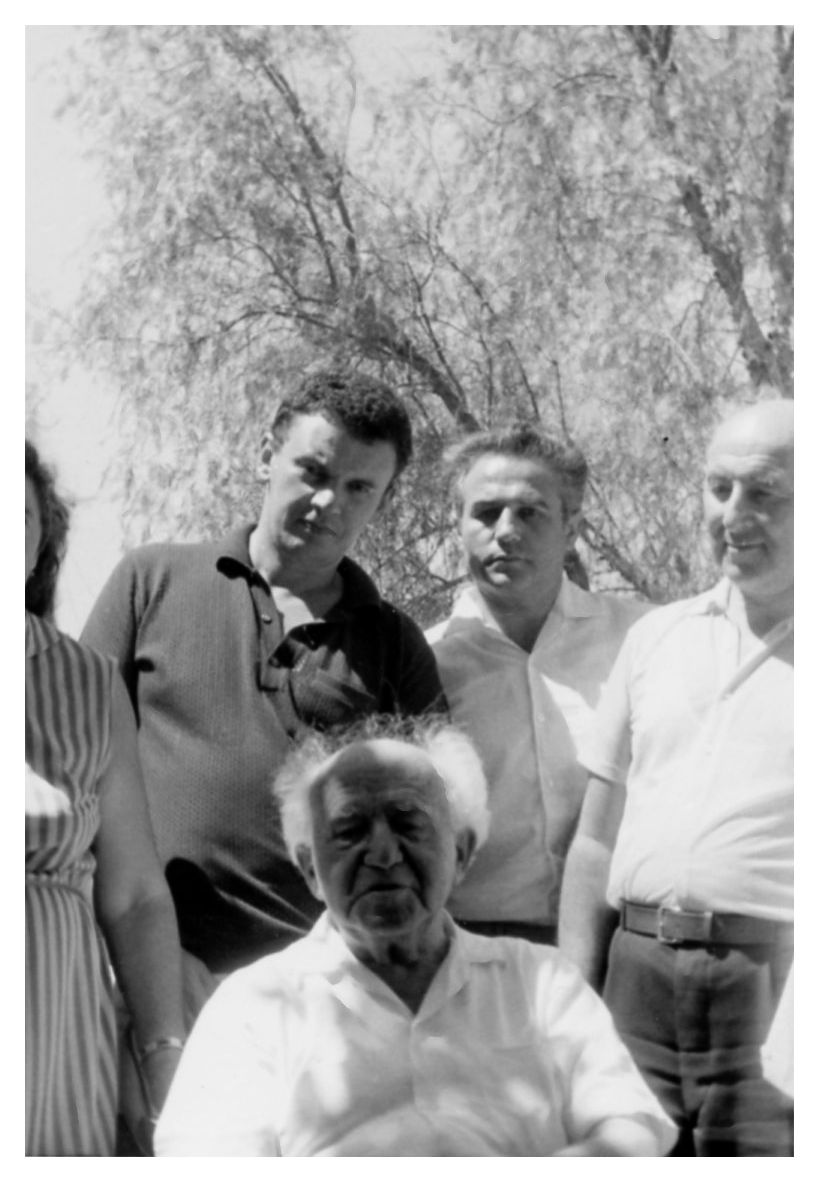
Anatoly Rubin and his comrades with David Ben-Gurion in Sde Boker, 1969

Rubin landed in Israel on 1 May 1969, and was sent to an absorption center in the northern town of Carmiel. There he found a large group of Russian Zionist activists who felt the time had come for open and public action against attempts to halt emigration from the USSR. He and his friends, Joseph Khrul and Joseph Schneider, wrote to the prime minister, Golda Meir, who invited them to her office.

An 18-member group from Georgia had also been invited, along with attorney Lidia Slovina and her husband, Zionist activists from Riga. The attendees all wanted to know why more was not being done to get Russian Jews out of the USSR. The Prime Minister explained that Israeli policy was to maintain public silence. Upon emerging from the meeting, the attendees concluded that they would have to take action themselves. Two of them flew to the United States to arouse public opinion there. At the same time, Nativ (a department of Israel's Foreign Ministry that was tasked with fostering Jewish education and awareness behind the Iron Curtain, and in facilitating emigration to Israel) sent two representatives to America to do the same, Joseph Khrul and then Rubin. At the time, the media was prohibited from publishing the names of those who had left the USSR. One American journalist had not heard of the prohibition and published Rubin's name and everything he told them.

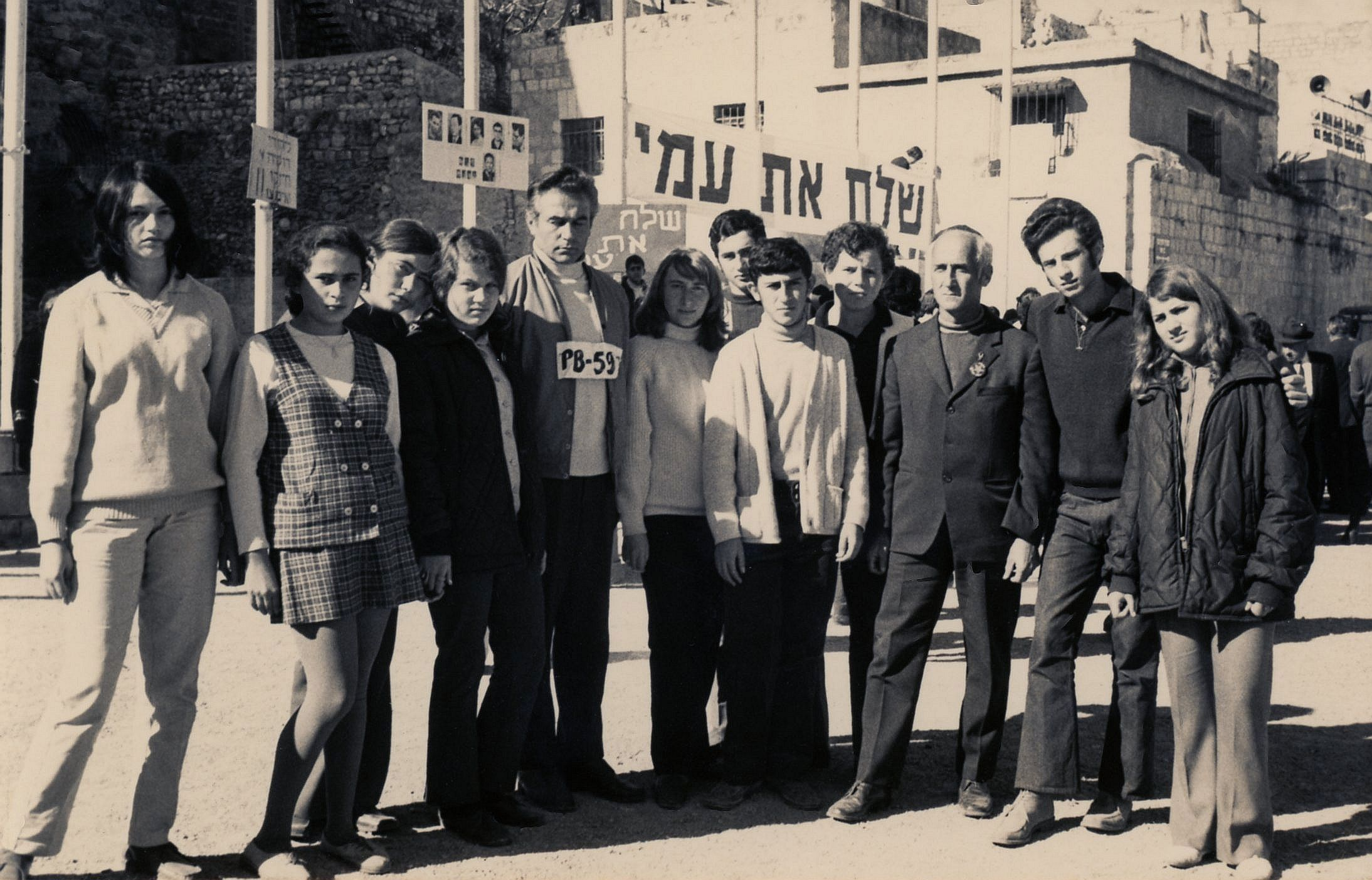
Anatoly and his comrades at the end of the hunger strike at the Kottel, 1970

When Russian Aliyah activists failed to persuade either Nativ or the Israeli Government to do more, they declared a hunger strike in front of the Wailing Wall. Nativ strongly opposed this move but it became the crucial push that set the movement to 'Let my People Go' in motion. Rubin, Khrul, Joseph Schneider and Asher Blank were enlisted by Nativ as advisers. In the camps, Rubin had felt a painful sense of aloneness and despair at the lack of outside support. He never forgot the activists' plea to him that Israel not remain silent, but rather do all in its power to help them get out.

In 1972, Rubin married Karny Jabotinsky Rubin (daughter of Eri Jabotinsky and granddaughter of Ze’ev Jabotinsky), psychiatrist and former ombudsman to the National Health Law (1996–2006). They had two children, Eri and Tamar, and later three grandchildren, Yoav, Maya-Shai and Itamar. Previously, in 1969, after he immigrated to Israel his daughter Ilona was born in the USSR and later had 2 grandchildren. The family lives in Atlanta, USA.

In Israel, Rubin began teaching physical education, at first in schools and then at the Hebrew University of Jerusalem. The link between physical fitness and national pride continued to drive him. To ensure that his experiences in the Holocaust and the gulags were not forgotten, he wrote his memoirs, first in Russian, a work My Path to the Land of Israel for which he shared first prize in a nationwide competition, which he was awarded in 1975, by Israeli President Ephraim Katzir. The book was then translated into Hebrew and published in 1977 by Dvir Publishing, under the name Brown Boots, Red Boots: From the Minsk Ghetto to the Siberian Labor Camps. After his death, Israeli author Galila Ron-Feder Amit reworked the translation. In 2004, she had written about Rubin in her book Prisoner of Zion, a Journey to the USSR of the Early Sixties and Prisoner of Zion Anatoly Rubin, the 26th volume of the Time Tunnel series.

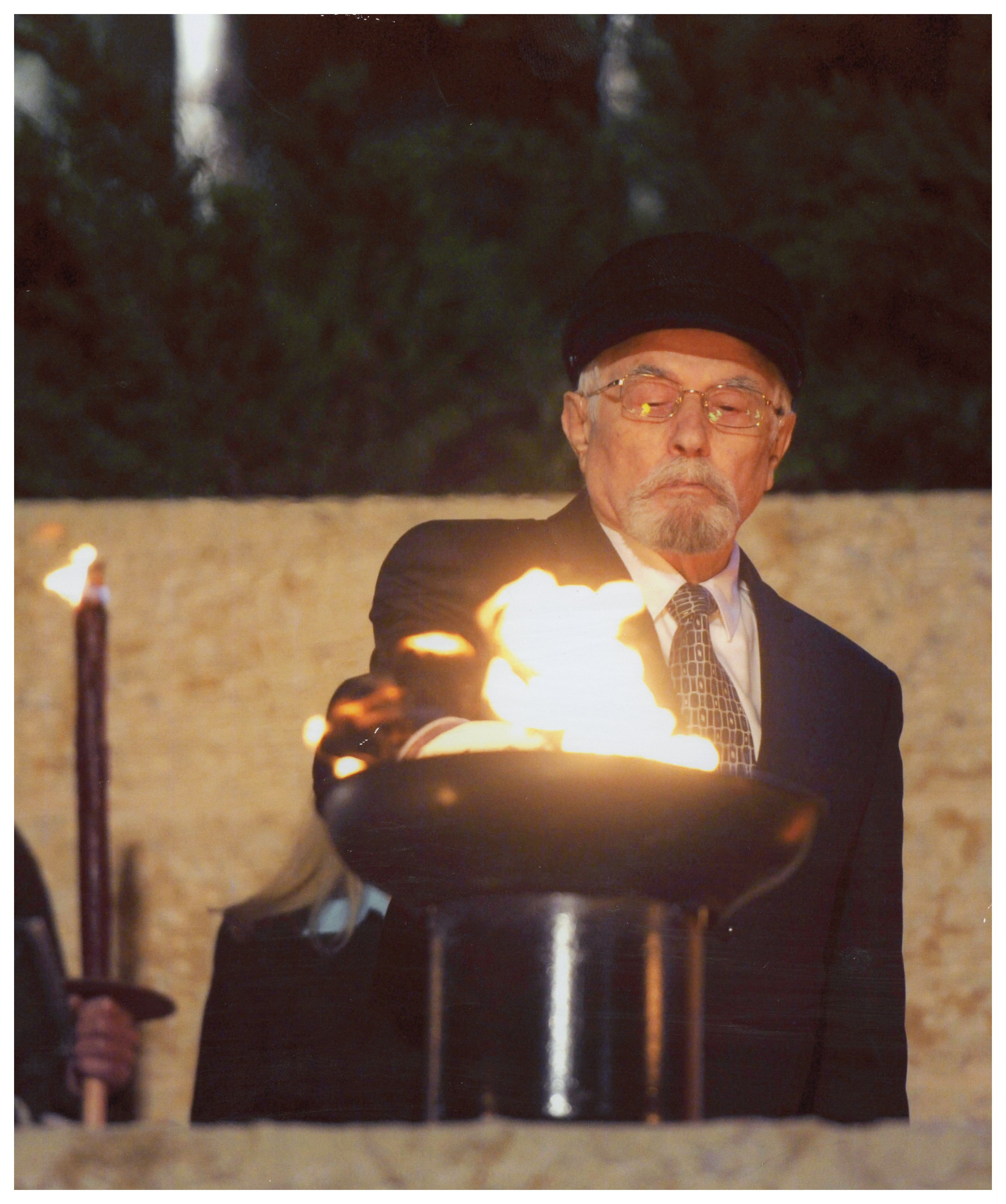
Anatoly Rubin lights one of the six memorial torches at the National Observance of Holocaust Memorial Day at Yad VaShem in Jerusalem, 2012

In 1989, Rubin was sent by Nativ to the USSR to encourage Aliyah. Over the next two years many Minsk and Leningrad Jews followed him to Israel.

Rubin died on 16 January 2017, and was buried in the Kiryat Anavim cemetery, near Jerusalem.

== Honors ==
In 2012, he was honored to light one of the six memorial torches at the National Observance of Holocaust Memorial Day at Yad VaShem in Jerusalem.

== Published works ==
- Rubin, Anatoly (1977), My way to Eretz Israel [A page from an endured life, chapter No.2] (in Russian), Jerusalem, pp. 84–250
- Rubin, Anatoly (1977), Brown Boots Red Boots [From the Ghetto of Minsk to the Camps of Siberia] (in Hebrew), Tel-Aviv, pp. 9–185 – via Dvir Co. Ltd
- Rubin, Anatoly; Re-written by Galila, Ron Fedder Amit (2019), An impossible Victory [From the Hell of Ghetto Minsk to the Atrocities in the Siberian Camps] (in Hebrew), Tel-Aviv, pp. 9–185 – via Niv Co. LTD
- Rubin, Anatoly (2019), ) A page of suffering and hardship [From the Hell of Ghetto Minsk to the Atrocities in the Siberian Camps] (in Russian), Tel-Aviv, pp. 9–185 – via Niv Co. LTD
