= List of castles in Belarus =

This is a list of castles in Belarus.

== B ==
- Belaya Vezha, a common misnomer for the Tower of Kamyenyets
- Babruysk fortress
- Brest Fortress, also known as Brest-Litovsk fortress

== H ==
- Hajciunishki
- Halshany Castle
- Hieraniony Castle
- Hrodna Old Castle
- Hrodna New Castle

== K ==
- Tower of Kamyanyets
- Kletsk Castle
- Kobryn castles
- Kopys
- Kosava castle
- Kreva Castle

== L ==
- Liahavichy
- Lida Castle
- Lubcha Castle

== M ==
- Mir Castle Complex
- Muravanka Church
- Minsk Castle

== N ==
- Navahrudak Castle
- Niasvizh Castle

== P ==
- Pischalauski

== R ==
- Ruzhany Palace

== S ==
- Smalyany Castle
- Slutsk Castle
- Shklow Castle
- Synkavichy Church
- Svislach Castle

== Z ==
- Zaslawye
