= Svislach Selsoviet, Mogilev region =

Rural council in Mogilev Region

Svislach Selsoviet (Belarusian: Свіслацкі сельсавет; Russian: Свислочский сельсовет) is a lower-level subdivision (selsoviet) of Asipovichy District, Mogilev Region, Belarus. Its administrative center is the agrotown of Svislach.

It includes the following populated places:

- Buda (village)
- Vyazychin (village)
- Golynka (village)
- Kopcha (village)
- Krasnoye (agrotown)
- Novosyolki (village)
- Palitskoye (village)
- Svislach (agrotown)
- Sloboda (village)
- Stolyary (village)
- Uglata (village)
- Chuchye (village)
- Sheypichi (village)
