= 465th Missile Brigade =

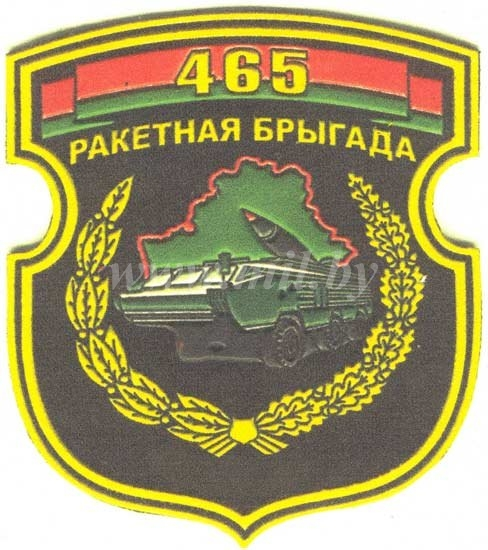
- Sleeve insignia of the 465th Missile Brigade
- Active: 1988 – Present
- Country: Soviet Union (1988–1991); Belarus (1992–Present)
- Branch: Soviet Army (1988–1991); Belarusian Ground Forces (1992–Present)
- Type: Tactical ballistic missile
- Size: 36 launchers in three battalions (2022 estimate)
- Part of: General Staff of the Armed Forces of Belarus
- Garrison/HQ: Yuzhny, Osipovichi
- Equipment: Tochka-U, Iskander

The 465th Missile Brigade (465 rbr) (Russian: 465-я ракетная бригада (465 рбр); Belarusian: 465-я ракетная брыгада); Military Unit Number 61732) is a tactical ballistic missile brigade of the Belarusian Ground Forces. The sole active ballistic missile brigade of the Armed Forces of Belarus, the brigade is armed with Tochka-U tactical ballistic missiles inherited from the Soviet Union and the Russian-supplied Iskander system. Based at the Yuzhny military base near Osipovichi, the brigade reports directly to the General Staff of the Armed Forces of Belarus.

Formed in 1988 at Baranovichi as part of the Soviet Army, the brigade came under Belarusian control following the dissolution of the Soviet Union. The brigade relocated to Tsel near Osipovichi in 2005, replacing the disbanded 22nd Missile Brigade, and by 2016 was based at Yuzhny together with the General Staff-reporting artillery brigades.

== History ==
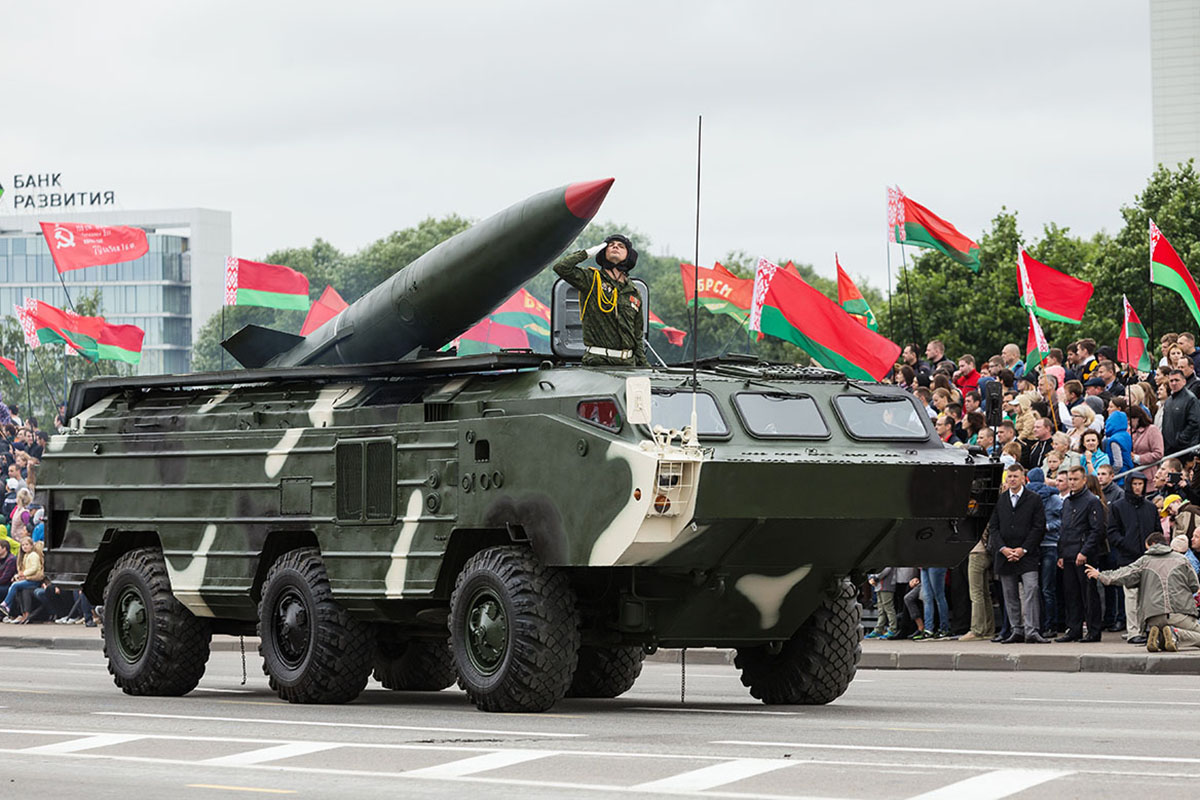
A Tochka-U of the brigade during the 2017 Independence Day Parade

The 465th Missile Brigade completed its formation on 1 September 1988 as part of the 28th Combined Arms Army at Baranovichi in the Belorussian Military District, a date celebrated as the brigade anniversary. The brigade was one of fifteen missile brigades formed that year equipped with the OTR-21 Tochka-U. The new missile brigades consolidated control at the army level of previously separated divisional Tochka missile battalions created when the system was introduced to service during the 1980s. As such, the brigade incorporated the 308th and 490th Separate Missile Battalions from the 28th Army's 6th Guards and 28th Tank Divisions, respectively. Under the command of Lieutenant Colonel Valery Chvey, the brigade conducted its first Tochka launches at Kapustin Yar in November 1989 and received a satisfactory rating. The 465th participated in a tactical exercise in August 1991 and was expanded by the formation of the 587th Separate Missile Battalion, since disbanded, on 1 December of that year.

The brigade became part of the Armed Forces of Belarus in 1992 following the dissolution of the Soviet Union. As designed, the Tochka missile can be fired with nuclear or chemical payloads, but only conventional payloads remain since the Belarusian renunciation of nuclear weapons. Servicemen of the brigade participated in firefighting efforts in Baranovichi District in 1994 and in disaster relief efforts for a 1997 windstorm in the Brest Region. The brigade performed the first Belarusian Tochka launch during tactical exercises at the Dretun weapons testing site in September 1996, and since then has been a frequent participant in Belarusian military exercises. As a reward for its performance in the Chistoye Nebo-2003 (clear sky) exercise, the 465th received the award pennant of the Belarusian Ministry of Defense, and the next year was awarded the pennant again for the Shchit Otechestva-2004 (Shield of the Fatherland) exercise. The brigade also participates in the annual Victory Day and Independence Day parades.

The brigade was relocated to the settlement of Tsel near Osipovichi in April 2005, replacing the disbanded 22nd Missile Brigade and incorporating the 383rd Missile Battalion of the latter to bring its strength to three battalions. With the disbandment of the 22nd, the 465th was left as the sole tactical ballistic missile brigade of Belarus. In keeping with the close military integration between Belarus and Russia, the brigade is a frequent participant in joint exercises with Russia, such as Zapad-2013. For budgetary reasons, the brigade was relocated in 2018 to the Yuzhny military base near Osipovichi, where the 51st Guards Artillery and 336th Rocket Artillery Brigades are also based. All three brigades are under the direct control of the General Staff of the Armed Forces of Belarus. According to International Institute for Strategic Studies Military Balance 2022 estimates, Belarus had 36 launchers remaining in its inventory, all operated by the 465th. Between 2016 and 2021, the brigade conducted four Tochka-U launches, as well as the one during the Soyuznaya reshimost (Allied Resolve) joint exercise with Russia days before the 2022 Russian invasion of Ukraine began partially from Belarusian territory. After the invasion, Belarusian President Alexander Lukashenko announced in May 2022 that Russia had agreed to allow Belarus to produce a domestic copy of the Iskander tactical ballistic missile system, the replacement for the Tochka, in order to modernize the Belarusian Armed Forces. The Belarusian Ministry of Defense announced on 1 February 2023 that a battalion of Iskander systems had entered full autonomous operation with the 465th Brigade.
