= 51st Army =

51st Army may refer to:

- Fifty-First Army (Japan)
- 51st Army (Russia)
- 51st Guards Combined Arms Army, Russia

== See also ==
- List of armies by number
- 51st Division (disambiguation)
- 51st Brigade (disambiguation)
- 51st Regiment (disambiguation)
- 51st Squadron (disambiguation)
- 51st (disambiguation)
