= Asipovichy =

Town in Mogilev Region, Belarus

Asipovichy Асіповічы (Belarusian) Осиповичи (Russian) Osipovichi
- Town
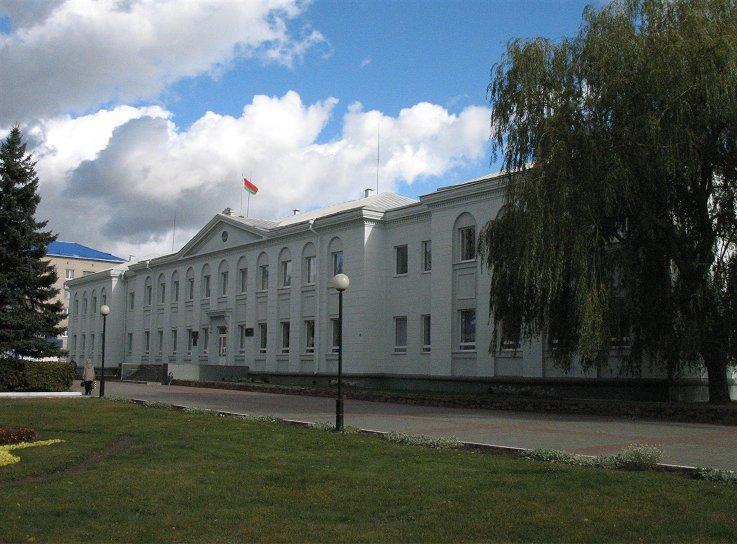

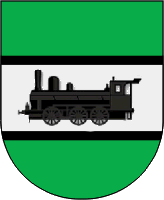
- Flag Coat of arms

- Location within Belarus
- Coordinates: 53°17′36″N 28°28′32″E
- Country: Belarus
- Region: Mogilev Region
- District: Asipovichy District
- Founded: 1872
- Elevation: 136 m (446 ft)

Population (2025)
  - Total: 28,745
- Time zone: UTC+3 (MSK)
- Postal code: 213759-213761, 213763-213765
- Area code: +375 2235
- License plate: 6
- Website: Official website (in English)

Asipovichy (Belarusian: Асіпо́вічы; Russian: Осипо́вичи, romanized: Osipovichi; Polish: Osipowicze; Yiddish: אַסיפּאָוויטש) is a town in Mogilev Region, Belarus. It serves as the administrative center of Asipovichy District. It is located 136 kilometres (85 mi) southwest of Mogilev, 3 kilometres (1.9 mi) south of the Minsk-Gomel expressway. It is located at the junction of railway lines between Minsk, Gomel, Mogilev, and Baranavichy. In 2020, its population was 29,900. As of 2025, it has a population of 28,745.

The active industries of Asipovichy include machine building, building materials, food production, and light and wood processing. It is home to the hydro-electric power plant on the Svislach River.

== History ==
A village existed on the site of the modern town during the 18th century, which in 1787 had seventeen dwellings as part of the Protasevichi folwark owned by Dominik Hieronim Radzivil in the Minsk Voivodeship of the Grand Duchy of Lithuania. In 1793, as a result of the Second Partition of Poland the village became a part of the Russian Empire. According to an inventory in 1805, there were 22 dwellings and 146 inhabitants in the village, and then 26 dwellings in 1834. In addition to agriculture and animal husbandry, the villagers were engaged in weaving, fishing, and woodworking. A sawmill and flour mill were founded in 1885. Meanwhile, a railway station on the Libau–Romny Railway was founded in forest two kilometers from the village in 1872. The railway contributed to the expansion of the forestry industry and the development of crafts in the area. During the late 1880s and first half of the 1890s, two sawmills, a mill, several houses, a post office, and an inn were built. The narrow-gauge Asapovichy-Darahanava railway was laid down in 1896. The Russian Empire 1897 census recorded 449 inhabitants in the village and 99 in the settlement that developed around the station; the region was part of the Bobruysky Uyezd.

A railway sleeper plant was founded in 1900 and in the early 20th century the village turned into an urban settlement with a bakery, workshops for the manufacture and repair of sled wheels and agricultural implements. There were more than 1,000 inhabitants in 1904, and in the 1905 Russian Revolution there was a worker's demonstration on 17 September 1905. The Asapovichy-Darahanava railway was extended to Uručča between 1905 and 1907, and the town turned into a rail junction from which more than a million poods of forestry products were shipped annually. There were two schools, a steam mill was built in 1908, a tar factory founded in 1909, and communication was established with Minsk and Mogilev. A locomotive depot opened in 1913 and the railway was extended to Slutsk in 1915 during World War I and converted to broad gauge. Soldiers of the town garrison rioted during August and September 1915. By 1917 there were 601 inhabitants in the village and 4,178 at the station, which became a town. After the October Revolution, a Red Guard detachment of 1,000 men was formed, which in January and February 1918 took part in the defeat of Józef Dowbor-Muśnicki's Polish troops. The town was occupied by German troops between 19 February and November 1918, and by Polish troops between August 1919 and July 1920. Red partisan detachments occupied in the vicinity during 1919 and 1920.

A pharmacy was opened in 1921 and telegraph restored, two schools, a railway club were opened, and a library followed the next year. Asipovichy became the volost center in January 1922. A power plant was put into operation in 1922 and the Red Chemist tar factory the next year. The People's House and Hospital was opened in 1924, and two clinics in 1925. The locomotive depot, sawmills, mill, and crafts workshops were restored, and a beekeeping cooperative was founded in 1925. A weather station was founded in 1926, and radio came to the town in 1925. By 1926 there were 3,504 inhabitants in the urban settlement, 616 in the village, and 141 at the station. During collectivization a machine tractor station was established in 1931 and an agricultural machinery repair workshop followed in 1932. From Asapovichy, a district newspaper began publishing and the Red Lumberjack newspaper targeted at loggers was published in 1934. Asapovichy received city status on 15 July 1935, and a secondary school, maternity hospital, and public bathhouse were built. In 1940 the town had grown to 14,000 inhabitants.

The town came under German occupation during World War II on 30 June 1941. Soviet partisans were active in the region during the war, undertaking sabotage against the railway junction and burning down the creamery. The town was liberated by the Red Army and local partisans on 30 June 1944.

In early 1944, the town was transferred to the administration of Bobruysk Region, reverting to the Mogilev Region in 1954. Soon after liberation, the town was rebuilt – the forestry enterprise, mill, creamery and the artels Red Chemist, Progress, and Social Work were restored, telephone and telegraph services resumed. The radio station began broadcasting and the depot and railway station were rebuilt. During the postwar years, enterprises were reconstructed and expanded and new ones established. A reservoir and associated hydroelectric power station were built near the town in 1953. Its population had grown to 15,777 by 1959. Industry in the town expanded significantly by 1990 with a roofing plant, reinforced concrete, industrial plant, forest products, automobile assembly, bread products, household services, creamery, stationery, and concentrates factories.

In 2006, there were enterprises of mechanical engineering and metalworking, construction materials, and the food industry. There was a professional lyceum, a Belarusian gymnasium school, four secondary schools, a special boarding school, a children's and youth sports and music school, an art school, 12 children's preschools, and a center for correctional and developmental training and rehabilitation. There was a district Cultural Center, 5 libraries, a center for children and youth, a club for children and youth tourism and local lore, a district center of folk crafts, 2 hospitals, a clinic and pharmacies, and district service centers. The city has 2 hotels, 2 public houses, a factory of consumer services, 2 points of collective use, a computer club, driving schools and DTSAAF clubs, stadiums, gyms and sports complex grounds, restaurants, cafes, the city market, 5 post offices and others. Attractions include the Asipovichy Museum of History and Local Lore, Mass graves of Soviet soldiers and guerrillas who died in the Great Patriotic War, graves of victims of fascism. Liberation Monument, and the Church of the Exaltation of the Holy Cross.

== Military ==
The Yuzhny (South) military base is located on the southeastern outskirts of the town on ulitsa Rabochye-Krestyanskaya (street). The base is home to the 51st Guards Artillery Brigade, 336th Rocket Artillery Brigade, and the 465th Missile Brigade. In 2017 the 51st Guards Artillery Brigade marked 25 years located in the town. A now-closed military base known as Severny (North) was also located on the northern outskirts.

== Notable natives ==
Nina Kamenskaya – Belarusian historian, teacher, and public figure. She has researched the history of the October Revolution and the Civil War in Belarus, the formation of the Byelorussian SSR, and the Communist Party and Komsomol of Belarus.

Vladimir Krukovsky – Belarusian poster artist. His posters primarily focus on history, culture, ecology, anti-war and anniversary themes, and playbills. He co-designed the Pahonia coat of arms, as well as the flag and small emblem of the Belarusian Popular Front.

Vladimir Komkov – Belarusian ballet dancer and teacher. He was a soloist with the State Opera and Ballet Theater of Belarus. His roles include Spartacus (Alexander Khachaturian's "Spartacus"), Tybalt (Sergei Prokofiev's "Romeo and Juliet"), and others. He has performed leading roles in one-act ballets.

Yuri Doroshkevich – Belarusian painter. The artist behind the murals and stained glass windows at the Radio Engineering College and Suvorov Military School in Minsk.

Anton Astapovich – Belarusian historian, ethnologist, and cultural scholar.

== Demographics ==
Historical population
Year	Pop.	±%
1897	500	—
1939	13,723	+2644.6%
1959	15,777	+15.0%
1970	19,705	+24.9%
1979	27,409	+39.1%
1989	33,808	+23.3%
1995	35,200	+4.1%
2001	35,466	+0.8%
2006	33,550	−5.4%
2018	31,129	−7.2%
2020	29,900	−3.9%
2023	29,329	−1.9%
2024	29,103	−0.8%

== Bibliography ==
- Lakotka, A. I., ed. (2008). "Асiповiчы". Гарады і вёскі Беларусі: энцыклапедыя (in Belarusian). Vol. 5. Магілёўская вобласць. Кн. 1. Minsk: BelEn. pp. 78–82.
