= Asipovichy Reservoir =

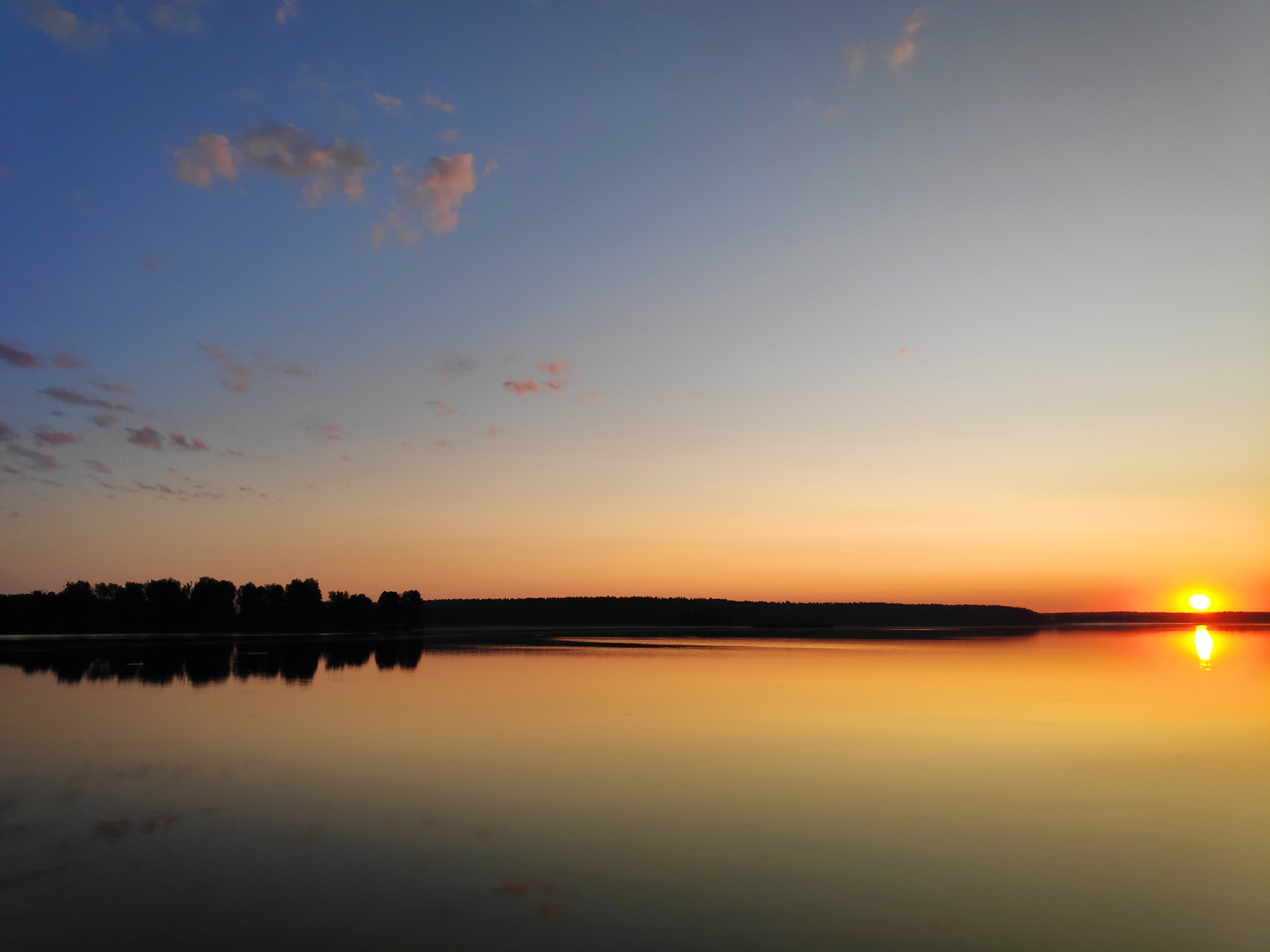
- Asipovichy Reservoir

- Location within Belarus
- Location: Asipovichy District, Mogilev Region, Belarus
- Coordinates: 53°23′42″N 28°34′24″E
- Type: reservoir
- Surface area: 12 square kilometres (4.6 sq mi)
- Max. depth: 8.5 metres (28 ft)

The Asipovichy Reservoir is situated by Svislach River in the Asipovichy District of Mogilev Region, Belarus.

The reservoir is created in 1953. Its area is about 12 square kilometres (4.6 sq mi), maximal depth: 8.5 metres (28 ft). Its primary usages are powering the Asipovichy Hydroelectric Station and watering the ponds of the Svisloch Fishery.
