= 51 =

51 may refer to:

- 51 (number), the natural number following 50 and preceding 52
- The year
  - 51 BC
  - AD 51
  - 1951
  - 2051
- 51 (film), a 2011 American horror film directed by Jason Connery
- "Fifty-One", an episode of the American television drama series Breaking Bad
- 51 (album), a 2012 mixtape by rapper Kool A.D.
- "Fifty One", a song by Karma to Burn from the album V, 2011
- 51 Nemausa, a main-belt asteroid
- The international calling code for Peru

== See also ==
- 51st (disambiguation)
- Area 51
