= 51st Division =

In military terms, 51st Division or 51st Infantry Division may refer to:

== Infantry divisions ==
- 51st Division (1st Formation) (People's Republic of China), 1949–1952
- 51st Reserve Division, German Empire
- 51st Infantry Division "Siena", Kingdom of Italy
- 51st Division (Imperial Japanese Army)
- 51st Division (Philippines)
- 51st Infantry Division (Russian Empire)
- 51st Infantry Division (South Korea)
- 51st Guards Motor Rifle Division, Soviet Union
- 51st Guards Rifle Division, Soviet Union
- 51st Rifle Division, Soviet Union
- 51st (Highland) Division, United Kingdom
- 51st Infantry Division (United States)

== Other divisions ==
- 51st Air Defence Division, Soviet Union
- 51st Guards Artillery Division, Soviet Union
- 51st Tank Division, Soviet Union

== See also ==
- 51st (Highland) Division War Memorial (disambiguation)
- Reel of the 51st Highlanders
- List of military divisions by number
- 51st Army (disambiguation)
- 51st Brigade (disambiguation)
- 51st Regiment (disambiguation)
- 51st Squadron (disambiguation)
