= 22nd Missile Brigade =

- Active: 1961–2005
- Country: Soviet Union (1961–1991); Belarus (1992–2005)
- Branch: Soviet Army (1961–1991); Belarusian Ground Forces (1992–2005)
- Garrison/HQ: Tsel

The 22nd Missile Brigade was a Tactical ballistic missile brigade of the Soviet Army from 1961 to 1992 and of the Armed Forces of Belarus from 1992 to 2005. For most of its history, the brigade was stationed in Dombóvár with the Southern Group of Forces. It moved to Tsel in the Belorussian Military District after the Soviet withdrawal from Hungary and was taken over by Belarus in 1992. The brigade was disbanded in 2005.

== History ==
On 23 August 1961, the formation of the 22nd Missile Brigade was ordered at Kremenchug in the Kiev Military District. The formation of the brigade was completed on 12 December 1961. It included the 381st and 454th Separate Missile Battalions, as well as a technical battery. The brigade was equipped with R-11 Zemlya (SS-1B Scud A) tactical ballistic missiles and later would receive updated R-17 Elbrus (SS-1C Scud B) missiles. The brigade's first commander was Colonel Vladimir Kramarenko. The brigade participated in the Exercise "Elektron" in July 1962. In May 1963, the newly activated 383rd and 397th Separate Missile Battalions became part of the brigade. On 22 September 1963, the 454th Separate Missile Battalion was transferred to the 175th Guards Missile Brigade in East Germany. The brigade moved to Dombóvár in Hungary, part of the Southern Group of Forces, in September 1967. On 26 December 1983, the brigade was awarded the pennant of the Minister of Defence for its performance in training exercises. In July 1990, the brigade withdrew from Hungary and was sent to Tsel in Mogilev Oblast, part of the Belorussian Military District.

In January 1992, the brigade was taken over by Belarus. In 1996, two battalions of the brigade were reequipped with the OTR-21 Tochka missile. The brigade participated in tactical exercises in 1998. In 2002, it participated in the exercise "Berezina-2002". Later, the brigade participated in the exercises "Clear Sky 2003" and "Shield of the Fatherland 2004". It was disbanded between 10 March and 22 May 2005. The 383rd Separate Missile Battalion was transferred to the 465th Missile Brigade. 60 of the brigade's Scud missiles were at a storage complex in the North Western Operational Command as of 2011.
