= 51st Brigade =

51st Brigade or 51st Infantry Brigade may refer to:

== Belarus ==
- 51st Guards Artillery Brigade

== India ==
- 51st Indian Brigade of the British Indian Army in the First World War
- 51st Indian Infantry Brigade of the British Indian Army in the Second World War

== Soviet Union ==
- 51st Guards Artillery Brigade

== Ukraine ==
- 51st Guards Mechanized Brigade (Ukraine)

== United Kingdom ==
- 51st (Ulster) Anti-Aircraft Brigade
- 51st Infantry Brigade (United Kingdom)

=== Artillery units ===
- 51st (Lancashire and Cumberland) Brigade, Royal Field Artillery
- 51st (Westmorland and Cumberland) Brigade, Royal Field Artillery
- 51st (London) Anti-Aircraft Brigade, Royal Garrison Artillery
- 51st (Cornwall and Warwickshire) Medium Brigade, Royal Garrison Artillery
- 51st (Midland) Medium Brigade, Royal Garrison Artillery

== See also ==
- 51st Army (disambiguation)
- 51st Division (disambiguation)
- 51st Regiment (disambiguation)
