= 51st Regiment of Foot (disambiguation) =

51st Regiment of Foot may refer to:

- 51st (2nd Yorkshire West Riding) Regiment of Foot, former British Army regiment, 1755-1881
- 51st Regiment Massachusetts Volunteer Infantry, American Civil War regiment
- 51st Indiana Infantry Regiment, American Civil War regiment
- 51st King's Own Yorkshire Light Infantry, British Army regiment, 1881-1968
