= Svislach Castle =

Former castle in Svislach, Belarus

Coordinates: 53°25′55″N 28°58′42″E

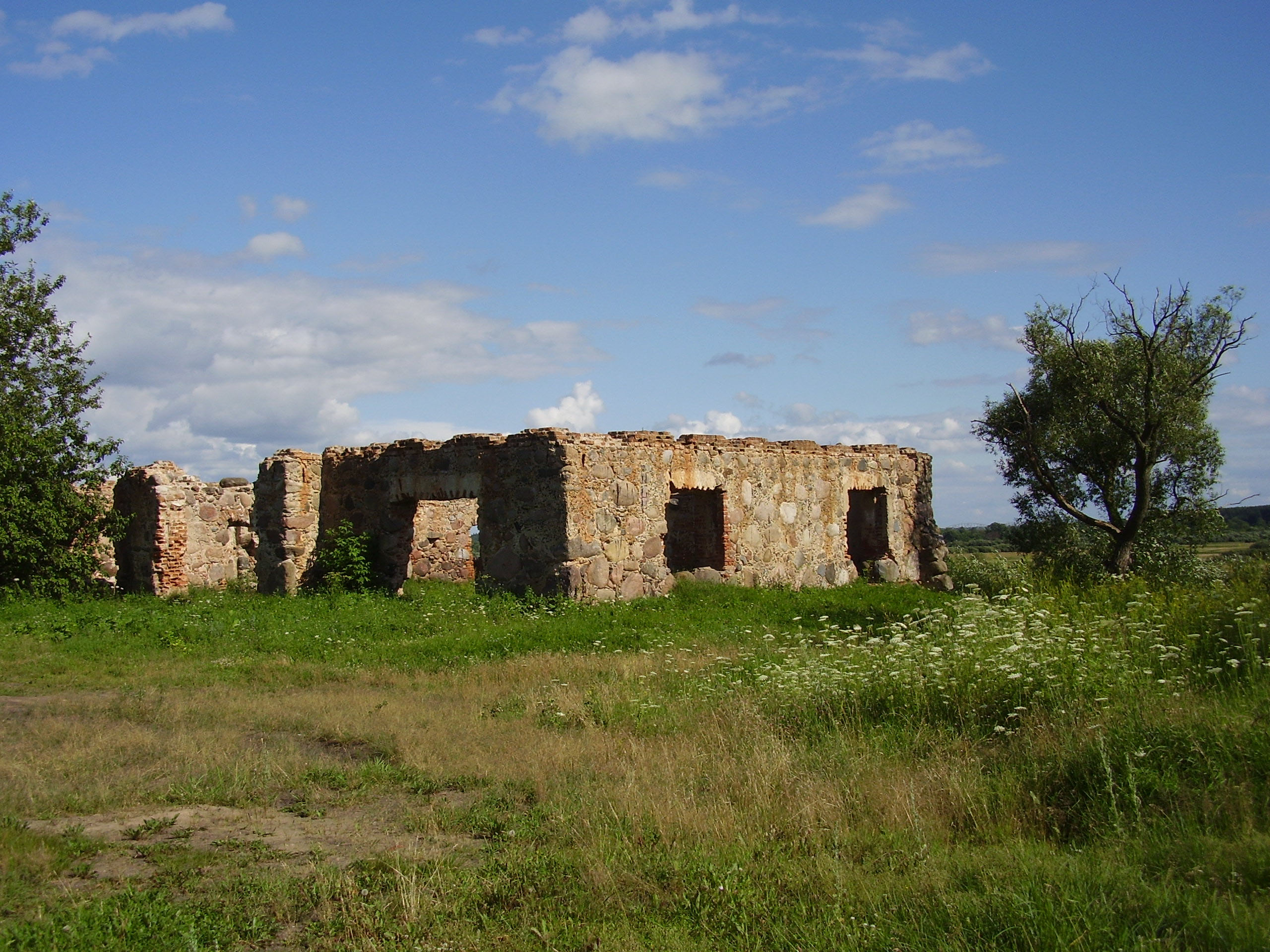
The remains of the Svislach Castle

Svislach Castle (Belarusian: Свіслацкі замак) was a castle that stood in the lands in present-day Belarus on the right bank of the Byarezina River where it meets the Svislach River. Initially, the castle was established as the center of the Duchy of Svislach; it later belonged to the Duchy of Minsk, and from the 14th century to the Grand Duchy of Lithuania. The castle came into the possession of the Radziwill family and one of its prominent owners was Bogusław Radziwiłł.

== Online references ==
- Svislach Castle at globustut.by
- History of Svislach Castle
