= Haytsyunishki =

Village in Grodno Region, Belarus

Haytsyunishki Гайцюнішкі
- Village
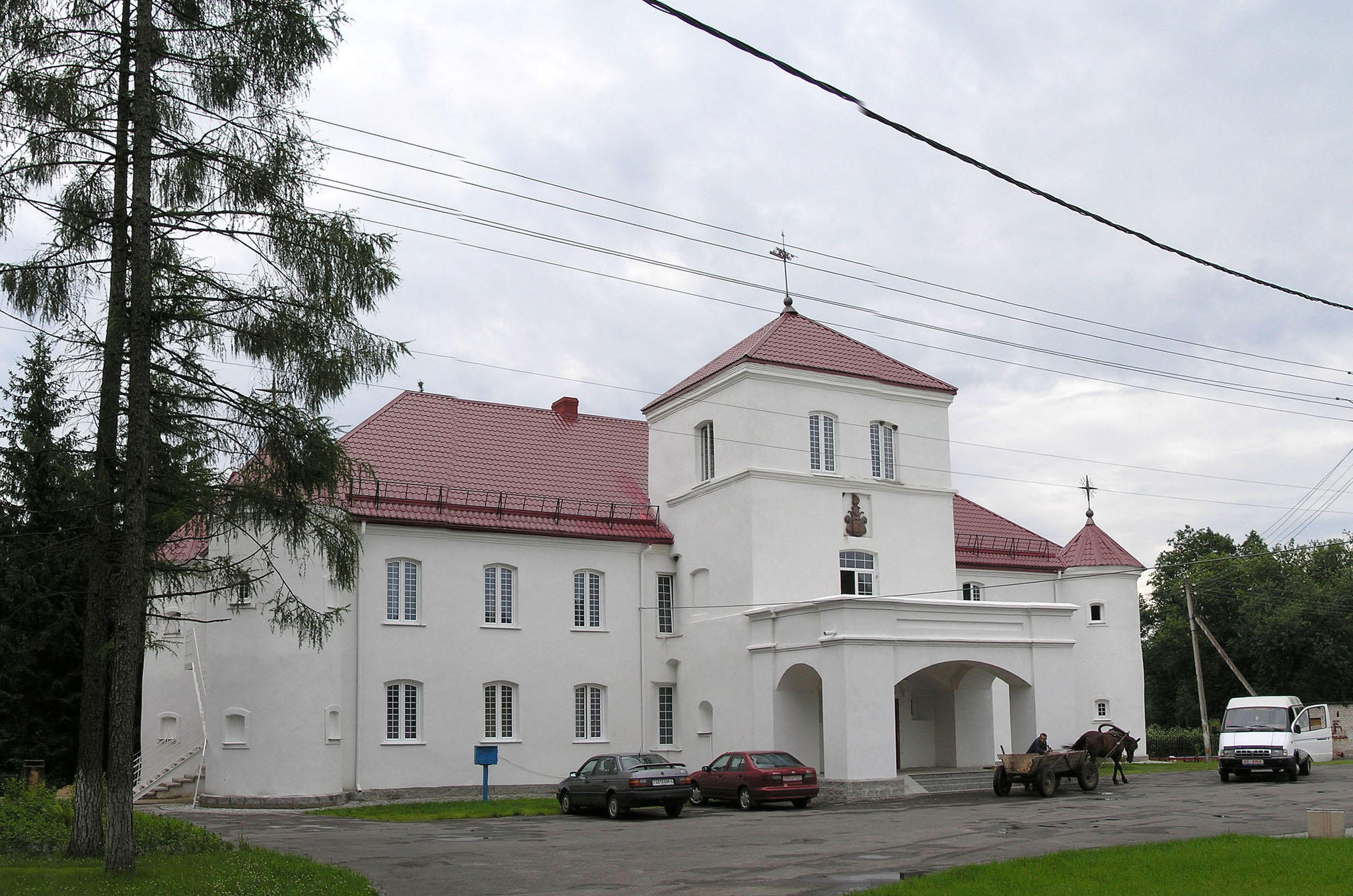

- Location within Belarus
- Coordinates: 54°15′12″N 25°26′02″E
- Country: Belarus
- Region: Grodno Region
- District: Voranava District
- Time zone: UTC+3 (MSK)

Haytsyunishki (Belarusian: Гайцюнішкі, romanized: Hajciuniški; Russian: Гайтюнишки, romanized: Gaytyunishki) is a village in Voranava District, Grodno Region, Belarus. It is known for a castellated house of Nonhart family, erected in the early 17th century.
