= 51st Air Squadron =

- Skadron Udara 51 "Reaper"
- 51st Air Squadron Badge
- Founded: 13 July 2015
- Country: Indonesia
- Branch: Indonesian Air Force
- Type: UCAV MALE
- Part of: 41st Air Wing
- Garrison/HQ: Supadio Air Base
- Nickname: Reapers
- Motto: "Jaya Aksi Angkasa"
- Website: https://www.instagram.com/skadronudara_51/

Commanders
- Current commander: Lt. Col. Agus Triyanto

Aircraft flown
- TAI Anka-S

The 51st Air Squadron (Indonesian: Skadron Udara 51) is a squadron of the Indonesian Air Force within the 7th Air Wing based in Supadio Air Base, Pontianak. Established on 13 July 2015, it is a dedicated unmanned aerial vehicle squadron primarily tasked with border reconnaissance. It is the first UAV squadron in the Indonesian Air Force.

It operates Israeli-made Aerostar TUAVs, and in 2025 it received Turkish-made Anka-S UAVs along with trialling the domestically produced Elang Hitam UAVs.
