= Joseph Schneider =

Australian architect

Joseph Schneider was an Australian architect active during the 1850s through 1870s.

Among his works is the Stevedore Street Uniting Church in Williamstown, Victoria. It is a Gothic Revival style bluestone church designed built ca. 1870. The proportions of the lantern and spire to its base and the detailing of the enframed storey are unusual. Another work was St. Kilian's Catholic Church (1857) in Bendigo, credited to the firm of George and Schneider of Melbourne. The firm also designed the St Vincent De Pauls Girls Orphanage (1858–1859) and Our Lady of the Rosary Church both in Melbourne.

Schneider was a member of the Philosophical Institute of Victoria, Melbourne, in the mid-1850s. It was later merged to form the Royal Society of Victoria.
