= Killing pit =

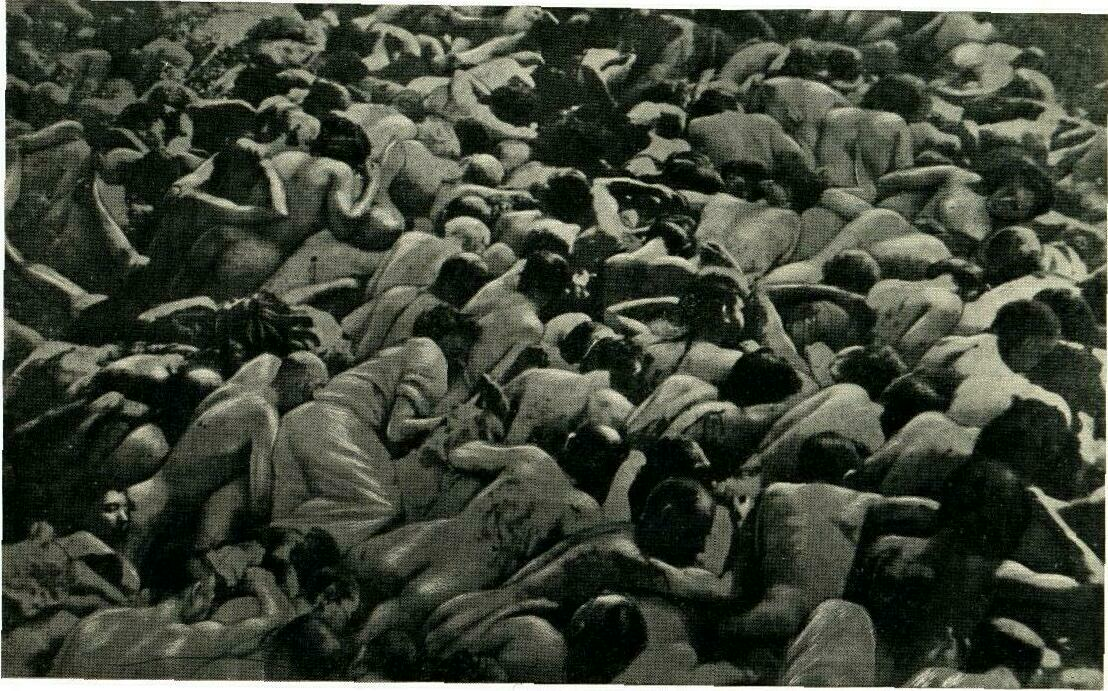
bodies in a killing pit in Zlotsov, Ukraine, around 1941.

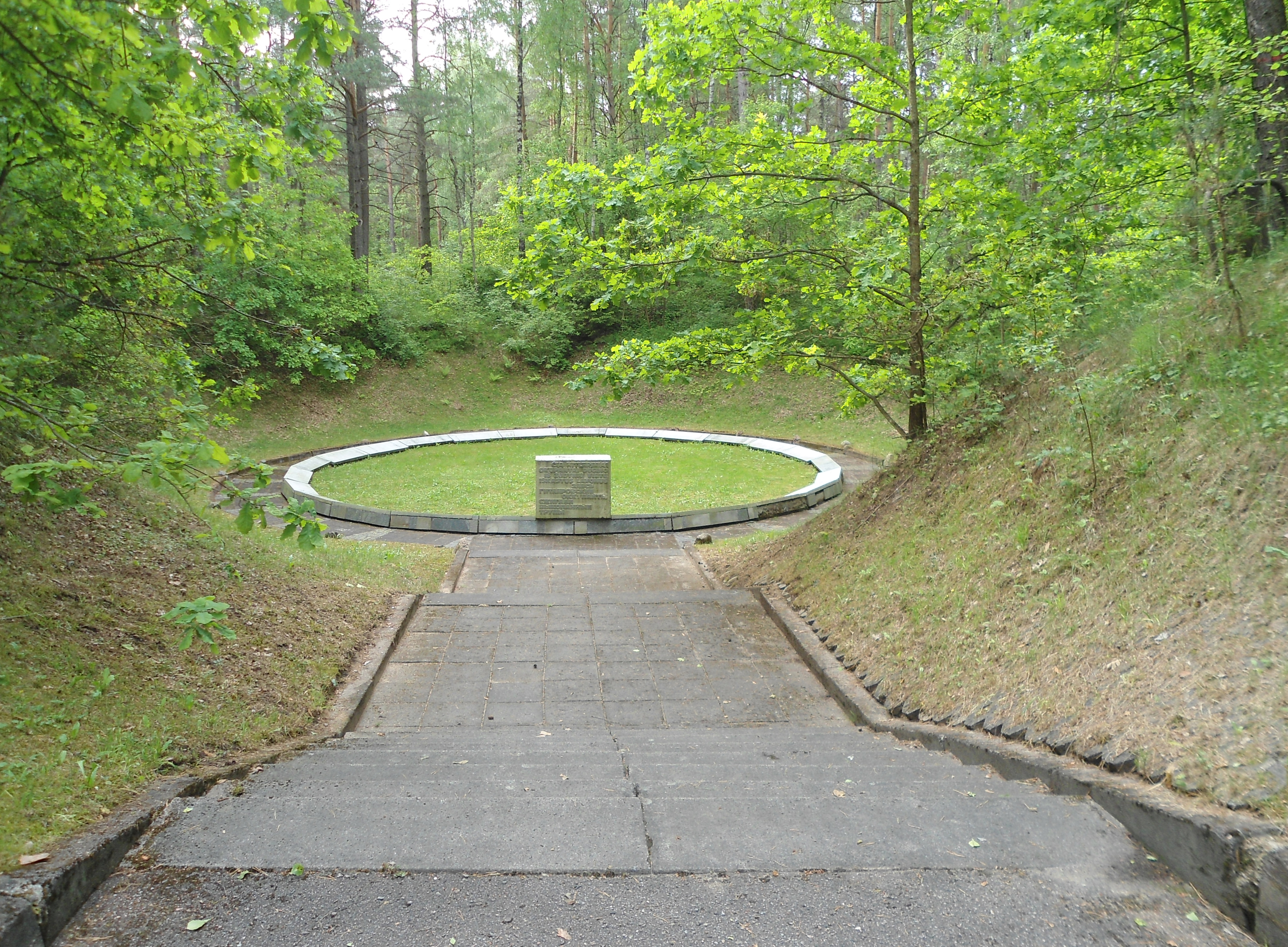
Killing pit at Ponary.

Killing pit (in German: Tötungsgrube) is a method of mass murder carried out by the Nazi forces of Germany, predominantly used during the initial phase of World War II in Eastern Europe, particularly in areas occupied by the Nazis in the Soviet territories (including eastern Poland, the Baltic states and eastern Romania). Among the notable sites of such mass shootings are Babi Yar, where the Jews of Kiev and surrounding areas were killed; Ponary, where the Jews of Vilnius were murdered; and the Ninth Fort in Kaunas. During the Holocaust, about one and a half million Jews were killed using this method.

== See also ==
- Mass grave
