= Asipovichy district =

District of Mogilev region, Belarus

Coordinates: 53°18′N 28°39′E

Asipovichy district Асіповіцкі раён (Belarusian)
- District
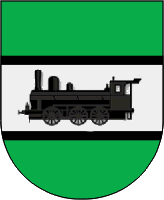
- Flag Seal

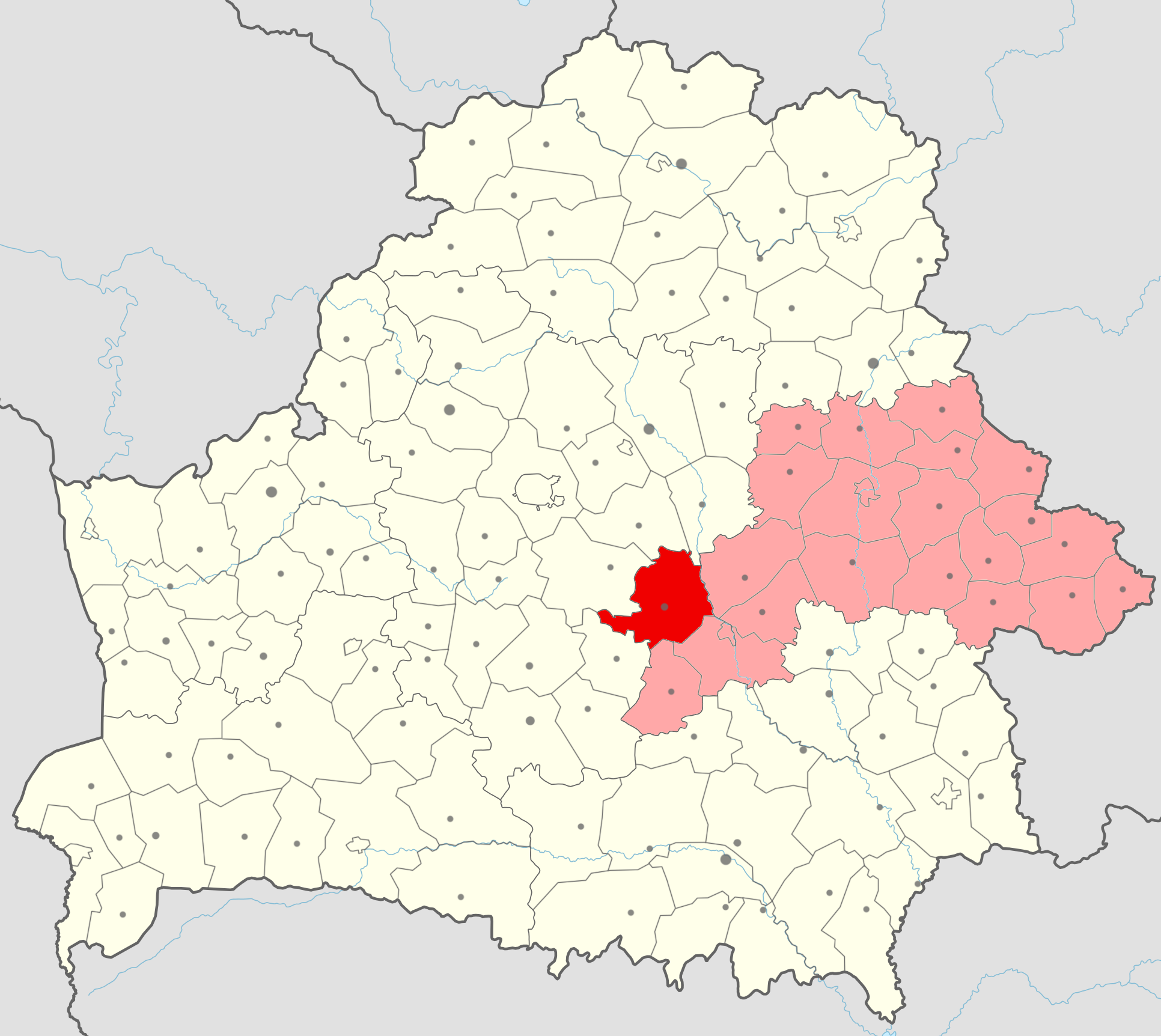
- Country: Belarus
- Region: Mogilev region
- Administrative center: Asipovichy

Area
  - District: 1,947.21 km^{2} (751.82 sq mi)
- Highest elevation: 207 m (679 ft)
- Lowest elevation: 136 m (446 ft)

Population (2024)
  - District: 43,365
  - Density: 22.270/km^{2} (57.680/sq mi)
  - Urban: 31,549
  - Rural: 11,816
- Time zone: UTC+3 (MSK)

Asipovichy district or Asipovičy district (Belarusian: Асіповіцкі раён; Russian: Осиповичский район, romanized: Osipovichsky rayon) is a district (raion) of Mogilev region in Belarus. Its administrative center is the town of Asipovichy. In 2009, its population was 52,447; the population accounted for 62.0% of the district's population. As of 2024, it has a population of 43,365.

== Geography ==
Major rivers in the district include the Berezina River and its tributaries, the Svislach and Ptsich. The Asipovichy Reservoir is on the Svislach. The largerst lake is Lake Lochinskoye.

== Transport ==
The railroad branches Minsk-Babruysk and Mogilev-Baranavichy and the automobile road Minsk-Gomel run through the district.
