= 51st Regiment =

51st Regiment or 51st Infantry Regiment may refer to:

- 51st Regiment of Foot (disambiguation), several units of the British Army
- 51st Highland Volunteers, a unit of the British Army
- 51st Infantry Regiment (United States)
- 51st Armoured Regiment (India)
- 51st Coast Artillery Regiment, a unit of the United States Army
- 51st (Leeds Rifles) Royal Tank Regiment
- 51st (Highland) Searchlight Regiment, Royal Artillery
- 51st (London) Heavy Anti-Aircraft Regiment, Royal Artillery
- 51st (Westmoreland and Cumberland Yeomanry) Field Regiment, Royal Artillery
- 51st Sikhs (Frontier Force), a unit of the British Indian Army

Union Army (American Civil War):

- 51st Illinois Infantry Regiment
- 51st Indiana Infantry Regiment
- 51st Regiment Massachusetts Volunteer Infantry
- 51st New York Volunteer Infantry
- 51st Ohio Infantry
- 51st Pennsylvania Infantry Regiment
- 51st Wisconsin Volunteer Infantry Regiment
- 51st United States Colored Infantry Regiment

== See also ==
- 51st Division (disambiguation)
