= 51st Guards Artillery Brigade =

- 51-я гвардейская артиллерийская бригада
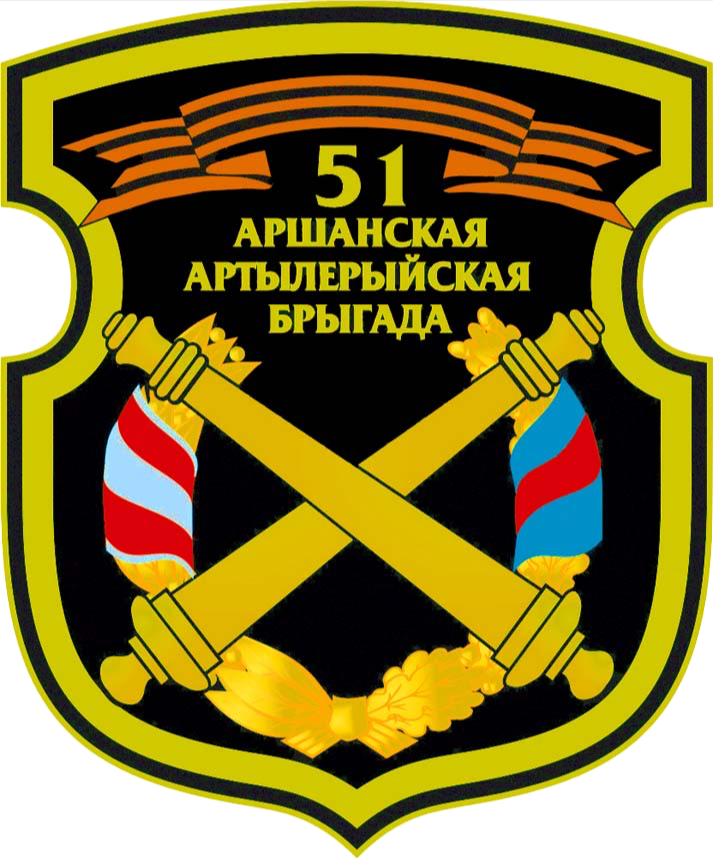
- Active: 1942–present
- Country: Soviet Union (1942–1991); Belarus (1992–present)
- Branch: Soviet Army (1942–1991); Belarusian Ground Forces (1992–present)
- Type: Artillery
- Garrison/HQ: Osipovichi
- Engagements: World War II: Battles of Rzhev; Operation Suvorov; Operation Bagration; Baltic Offensive; Battle of Königsberg
- Decorations: Order of the Red Banner; Order of Alexander Nevsky
- Battle honours: Orsha

Commanders
- Current commander: Colonel Aleksey Ratushny

Insignia
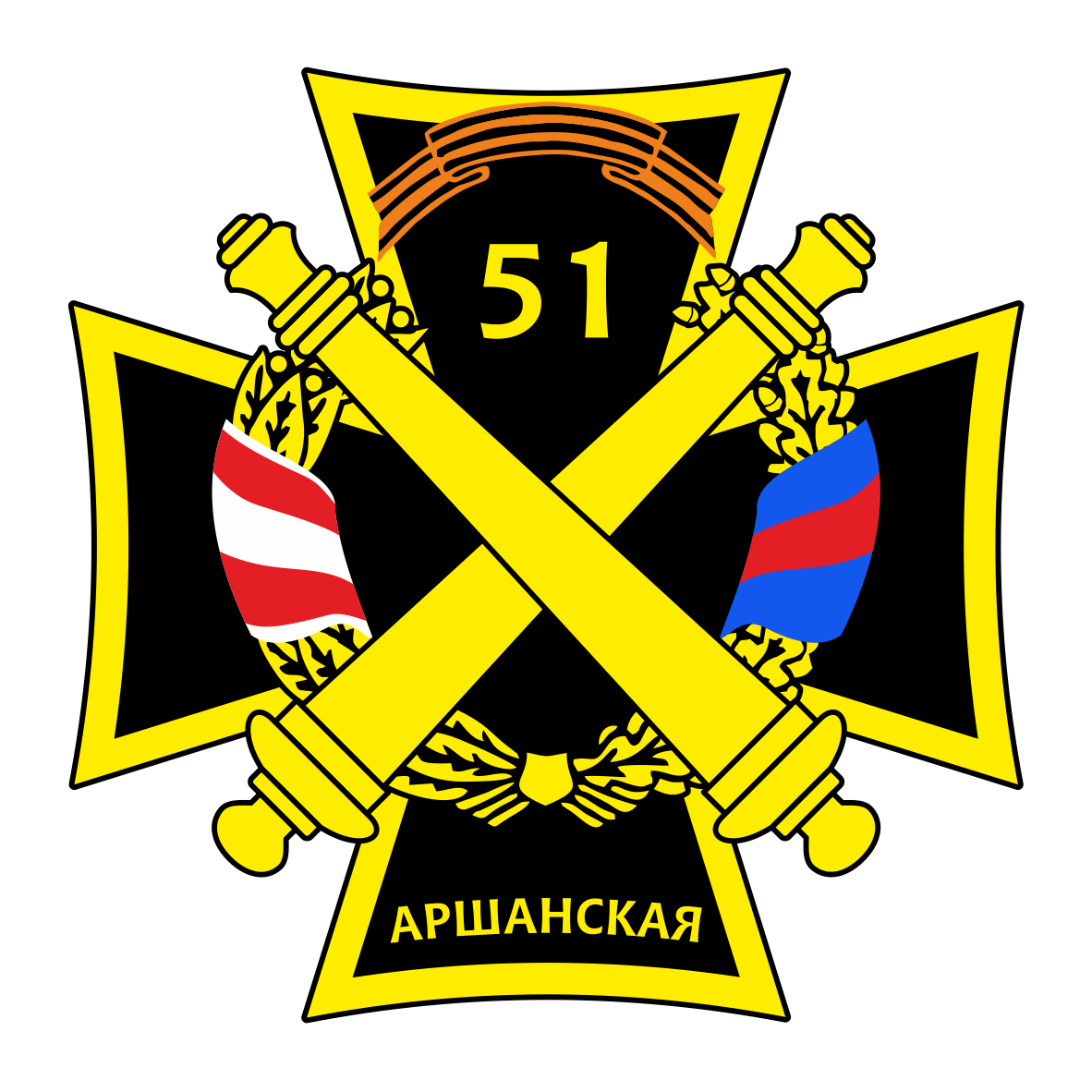
- Insignia

The 51st Guards Artillery Brigade (Military Unit Number 12147) is an artillery brigade of the Belarusian Ground Forces, based at Osipovichi.

Formed in 1942 during World War II as the 83rd Corps Artillery Regiment, the unit was made an elite Guards military unit, the 83rd Guards Howitzer Artillery Regiment in mid-1943 for its actions in the Battles of Rzhev. The regiment fought in the Battle of Smolensk and Operation Bagration before advancing into the Baltic states, ending the war in the Battle of Königsberg. Postwar, it went through several reorganizations and was relocated to Osipovichi in 1960, when it became the 121st Guards Artillery Brigade. In 1972, the brigade was expanded into the 51st Guards Artillery Division.

After the dissolution of the Soviet Union, the unit became part of the Belarus Ground Forces, and in 1996 became the 51st Guards Central Artillery Reinforcement Group. In 2004 it was redesignated as the 51st Guards Mixed Artillery Group, before becoming the 51st Guards Artillery Brigade, its current title, in 2014.

== World War II ==
On 7 August 1942, by an order of the People's Commissariat of Defense, the 83rd Corps Artillery Regiment was formed in Kolomna. It was listed as part of the Moscow Military District by the Combat Composition of the Soviet Army on 1 September, and then with 22nd Army of Kalinin Front two months later. On 10 August 1943, for its courage and heroism in the capture of Vyazma during the Third Rzhev–Sychyovka Offensive, the regiment was converted into the 83rd Guards Howitzer (Corps) Artillery Regiment. It then fought in the Battle of Smolensk. For assisting in the capture of Orsha on 28 June 1944 in the Vitebsk–Orsha Offensive, part of Operation Bagration, the regiment received the city's name as an honorific. It then fought in the Minsk Offensive. On 25 July, for its exemplary completion of command tasks in the capture of Grodno during the Belostock Offensive and for displaying courage and heroism, the regiment was awarded the Order of Alexander Nevsky.

On 12 August, it was awarded the Order of the Red Banner for its courage and heroism in the crossing of the Neman and the capture of a bridgehead on the opposite bank. The regiment helped capture Kaunas in the Kaunas Offensive. The regiment ended the war in April 1945 in the town of Gross Blumenau in East Prussia after fighting in the Battle of Königsberg.

== Cold War ==
On 12 September 1949, in accordance with a directive of the Chief of the General Staff of the Armed Forces of the USSR of 2 July of that year, the 83rd Guards Regiment was reorganized as the 347th Guards Corps Artillery Brigade. On 25 May 1955, in accordance with a directive of 4 March of that year, the brigade was renumbered as the 39th Guards Corps Artillery Brigade. On 1 December, in accordance with a directive of 1 September, the brigade was reorganized as the 1127th Guards Corps Artillery Regiment. It became the 121st Guards Gun Artillery Brigade on 1 July 1956 in accordance with a directive of 19 April of that year, and received the battle flag of the 83rd Guards Howitzer Artillery Regiment. The brigade was stationed in Baranovichi, but on 1 July 1960 was reorganized as the 121st Guards Artillery Brigade in accordance with a directive of 13 May and relocated to Osipovichi.

By a directive of the commander of the Belorussian Military District of 25 August 1972, the brigade became the 51st Guards Artillery Division (reduced strength). It initially carried the Military Unit Number 41603. In July 1984, the unit received its battle flag. It was directly subordinated to the district headquarters, and by the late 1980s included the 170th Howitzer Artillery Brigade, the 171st Heavy Howitzer Artillery Brigade, the 178th Gun Artillery Brigade, the 336th Rocket Artillery Brigade, the 197th High Power Artillery Brigade, and the 502nd Anti-Tank Artillery Brigade. Support units included the 353rd Separate Equipment Maintenance and Recovery and 586th Separate Material Supply Battalions and the 626th Separate Medical Company. The 170th and 171st Brigades had been formed from the 1335th and 1336th Regiments, respectively, in 1984.

The division participated in the exercises Vesna-75, Berezina, Zapad-81, and Osen-88. On 30 December 1988, for its skills shown in exercises, the division received the Ministry of Defence Pennant for courage and military valor.

In 1989, the 502nd Anti-Tank Artillery Brigade became a separate unit. On 19 November 1990, according to CFE Treaty data, the division's 170th Howitzer Artillery Brigade was equipped with 49 122 mm D-30 howitzers, two 2S1 Gvozdika self-propelled guns, two 2S3 Akatsiya self-propelled guns, and one 2A65 Msta-B 152 mm howitzer, while vehicles included 60 MT-LBT. The 171st Heavy Howitzer Artillery Brigade had 48 2A65 Msta-B, the 178th Gun Artillery Brigade 48 2S5 Giatsint-S self propelled guns, and the 336th Rocket Artillery Brigade 48 9A52 Smerch multiple rocket launchers.

== Belarusian Ground Forces service ==
In March 1992, the division was taken over by the Armed Forces of Belarus. On 1 August 1996, the 51st Guards Artillery Division was reformed as the 51st Guards Central Artillery Reinforcement Group in Osipovichi. It participated in Exercise Neman-2001, Exercise Berezina-2002, and Osen-2008. On 20 February 2004, it became the 51st Guards Mixed Artillery Group. The group was directly subordinated to the Chief of Missile Troops and Artillery of the Armed Forces of Belarus, and served as a testing unit for tactical changes. By 2013, it included two battalions: a self-propelled gun battalion with the 2S5 Giatsint-S and a howitzer battalion with the 152 mm 2A65 Msta-B. In September 2014, its chief of staff, Colonel Andrey Zhidovich, became commander of the group. The group was reorganized into the 51st Guards Artillery Brigade on 30 October of that year. At least one self-propelled gun battalion from the brigade participated in the joint Zapad 2017 exercise alongside Russian troops.

In November 2017, testing of Russian-made 2B23 Nona-M1 120mm mortars was conducted at the brigade's training range by artillerymen from the 38th Guards Air Assault Brigade and 103rd Guards Airborne Brigade.

Since December 2017, the brigade has been commanded by Colonel Alexey Ratushny.

== Sources ==
=== Bibliography ===
- Feskov, V.I.; Golikov, V.I.; Kalashnikov, K.A.; Slugin, S.A. (2013). Вооруженные силы СССР после Второй Мировой войны: от Красной Армии к Советской [The Armed Forces of the USSR after World War II: From the Red Army to the Soviet: Part 1 Land Forces] (in Russian). Tomsk: Scientific and Technical Literature Publishing. ISBN 9785895035306.
- Holm, Michael (22 March 2015). "51st Guards Orshanskaya Red Banner order of Aleksandr Nevskiy Artillery Division [51-я гвардейская артиллерийская Оршанская Краснознамённая ордена Александра Невского дивизия]". Soviet Armed Forces 1945-1991: Organisation and Order of Battle.
- Lenskii, A.G.; Tsybin, M.M. (2001). Советские сухопутные войска в последний год Союза ССР [The Soviet Ground Forces in the Last Years of the USSR]. St Petersburg: B&K Publishers. ISBN 5-93414-063-9.
- Pokrovsky, Alexander (1960). "Перечень № 13. I. Артиллерийские полки" [List (Perechen) No. 13 Part I. Artillery Regiments.] (in Russian). Moscow: Voenizdat.
