= 51 Squadron =

51 Squadron may refer to:

- No. 51 Squadron IAF, India
- No. 51 Squadron RAF, United Kingdom
- No. 51 Squadron RAF Regiment
- 51 Squadron, later 201 Squadron, Portugal
- 51st Air Squadron, Indonesian Air Force
- 51st Bombardment Squadron, United States Air Force
- 51st Fighter Squadron, United States Air Force
- 51st Troop Carrier Squadron, United States Air Force
- Air Development Squadron 51, Japan
- HSM-51 (Helicopter Maritime Strike Squadron 51), United States Navy
- VF-51 (Fighter Squadron 51), United States Navy
