= Svislach (Berezina) =

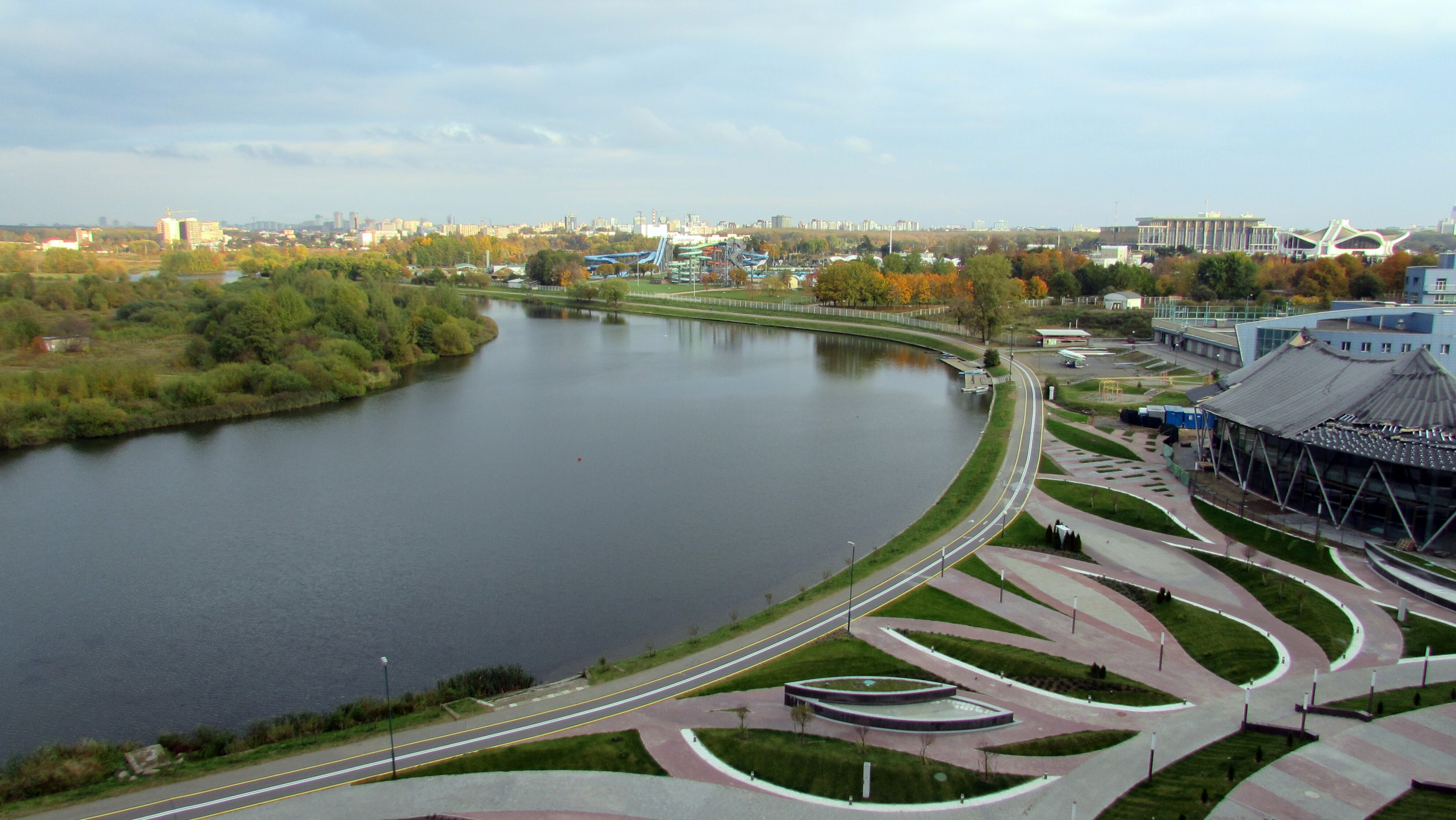
- The Svislach in Minsk
- Native name: Свіслач (Belarusian); Свислочь (Russian)

Location
- Country: Belarus

Physical characteristics
- Source
  - location: Grodno Region
- Mouth
  - location: Berezina
  - coordinates: 53°25′35″N 28°58′58″E
- Length: 327 km (203 mi)
- Basin size: 5,160 km^{2} (1,990 sq mi)
- Discharge
  - average: 30 m^{3}/s (1,100 cu ft/s)

Basin features
- Progression: Berezina→ Dnieper→ Dnieper–Bug estuary→ Black Sea

The Svislach (Belarusian: Свіслач, romanized: Śvislač, pronounced [ˈsʲvʲisɫatʂ]) or Svisloch (Russian: Свислочь) is a river in Belarus. A right-bank tributary of the river Berezina, the Svislach is 327 kilometres (203 mi) long, and has a drainage basin of 5,160 square kilometres (1,990 sq mi).

Its name is derived from the root -visl- 'flowing,' of Indo-European origin (compare Vistula).

The Svislach flows through Minsk, the capital of Belarus.

== Gallery ==
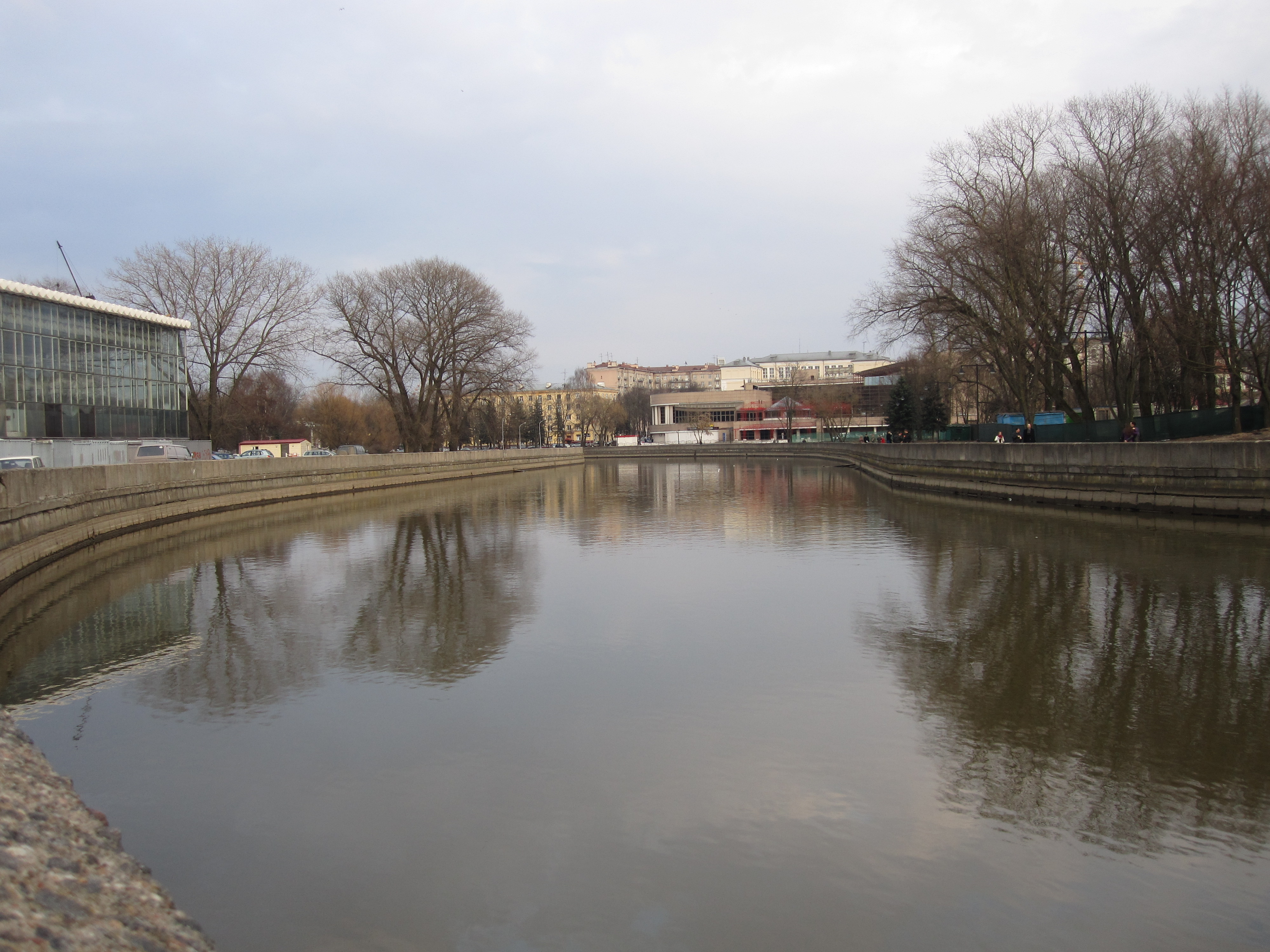
Svislach in Minsk

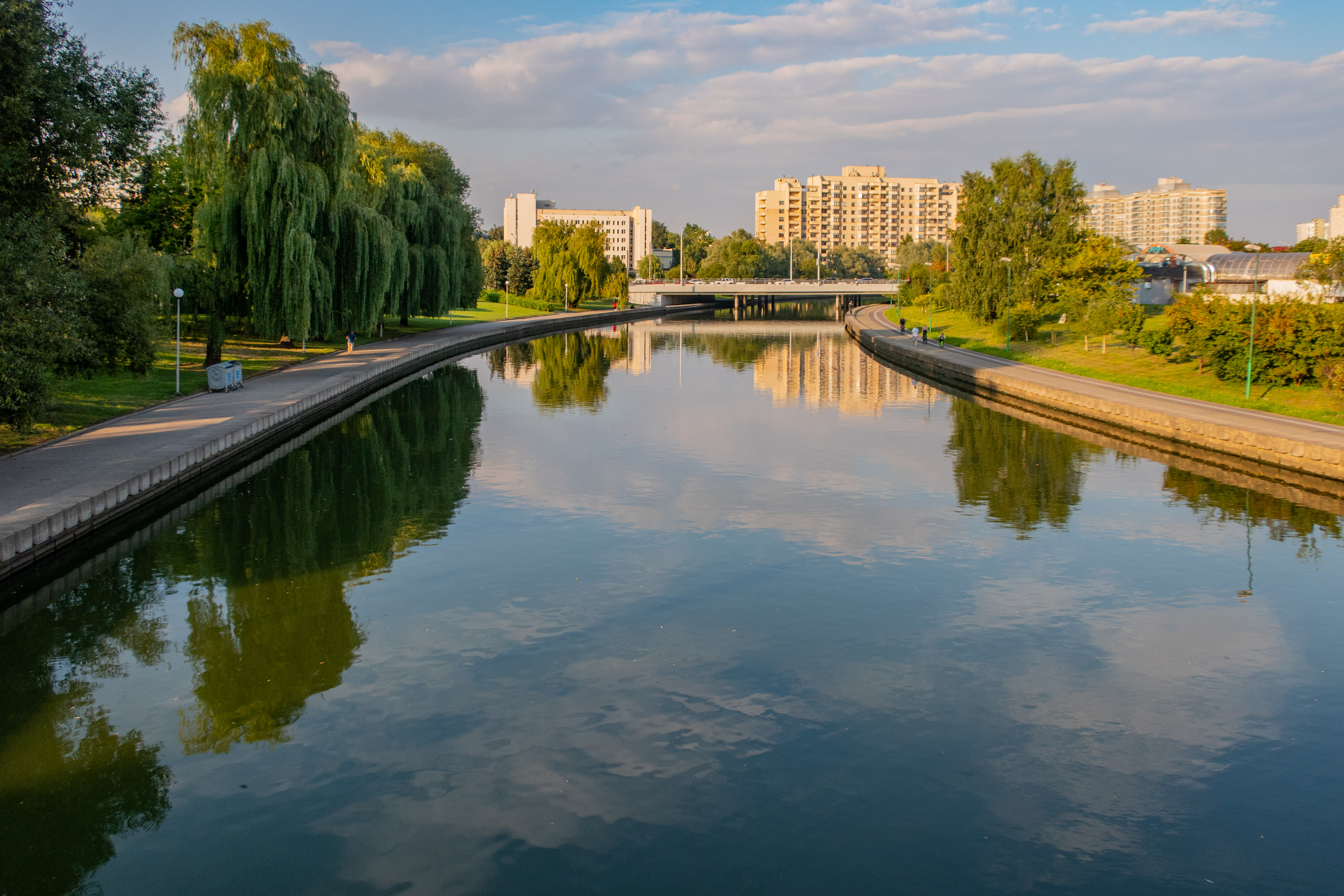
Svislach in Minsk

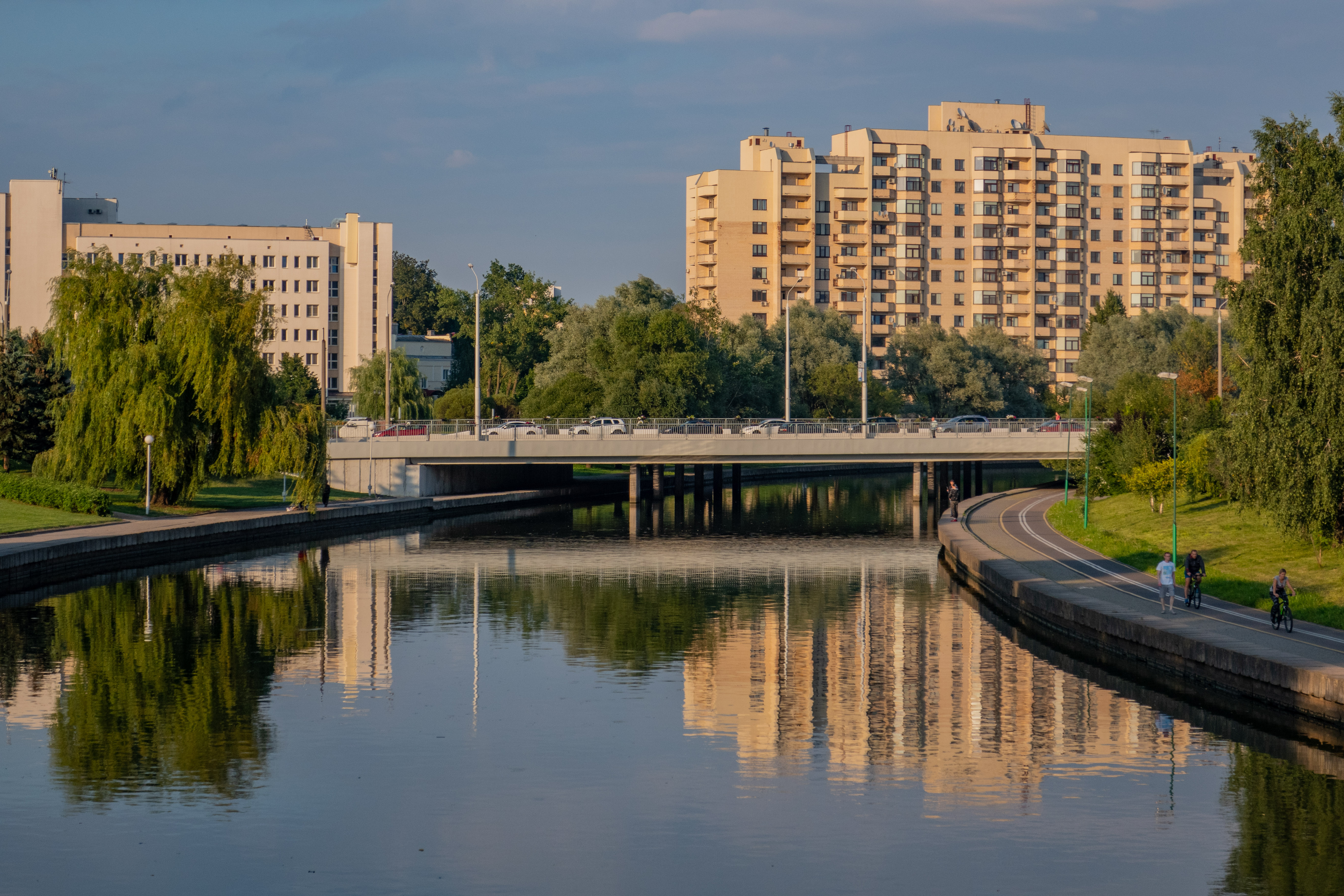
Svislach in Minsk

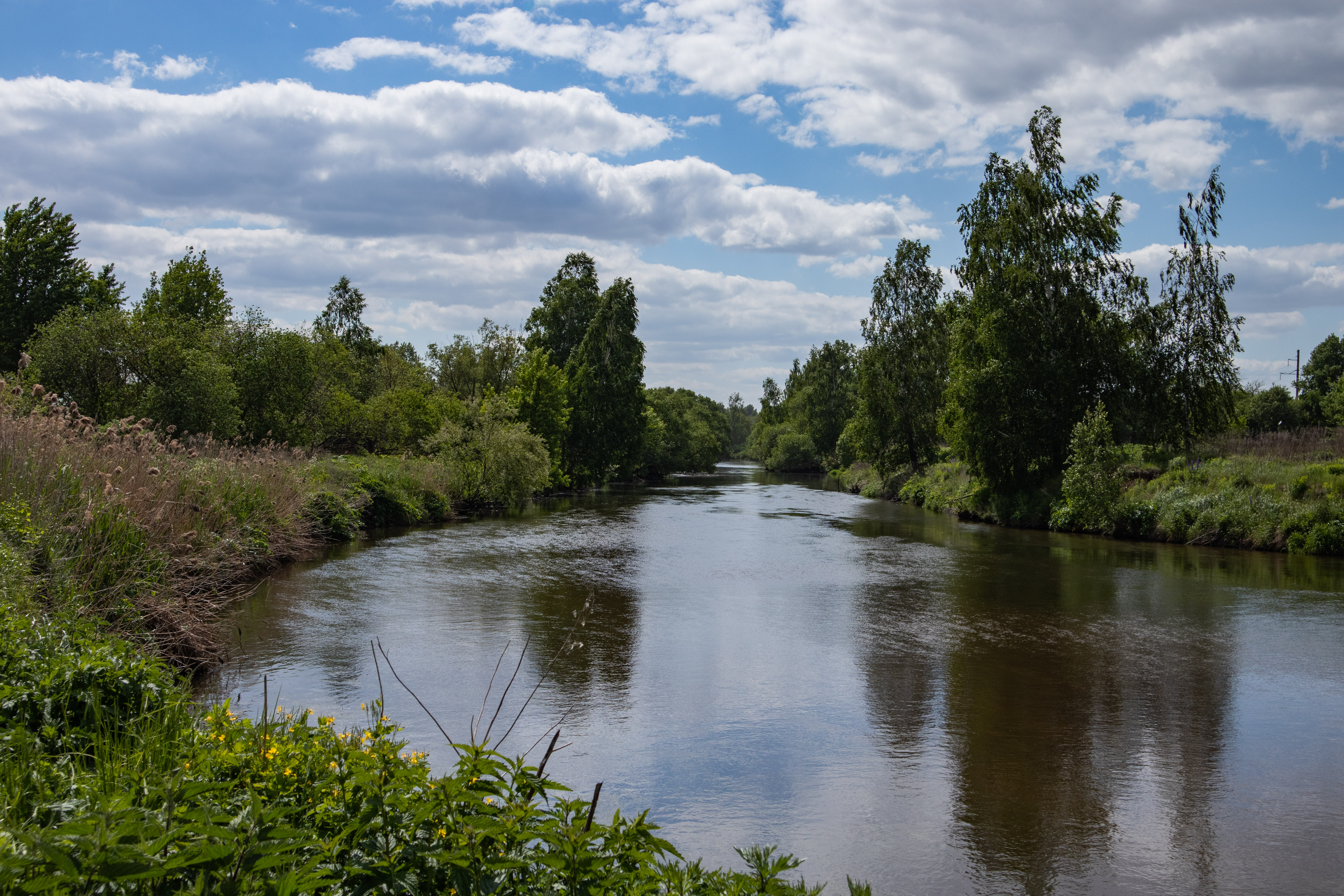
Svislach near Minsk

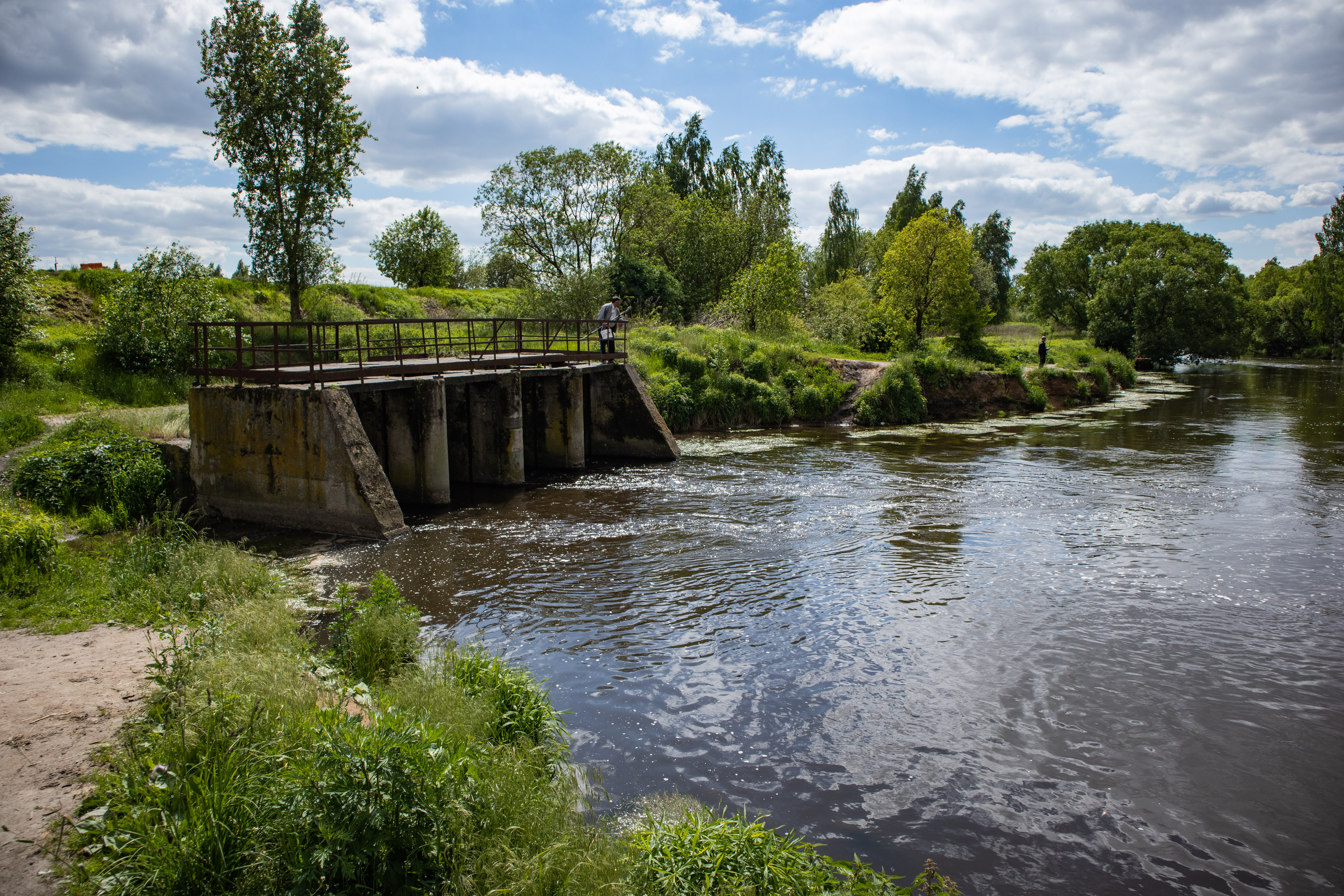
Svislach near Minsk
