= List of Sukhoi Su-25 operators =

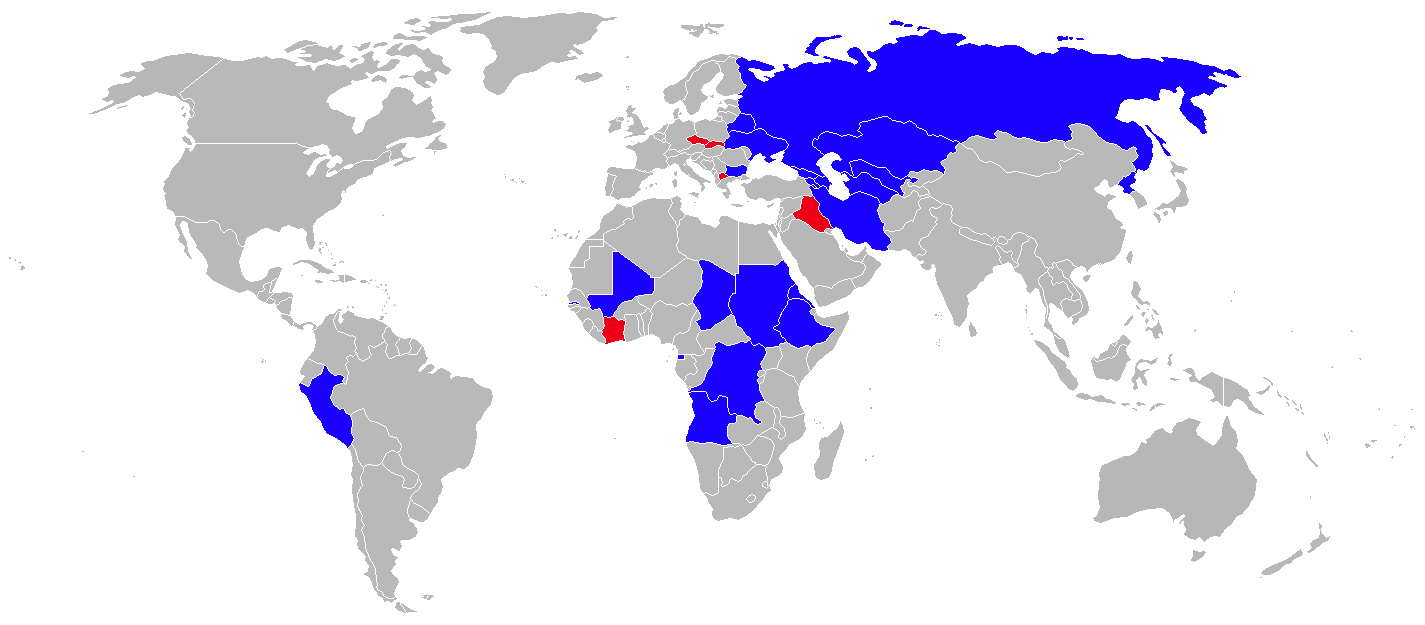
Military operators of the Su-25: Current Former

This list is of all operators of the Sukhoi Su-25.

== Current operators ==
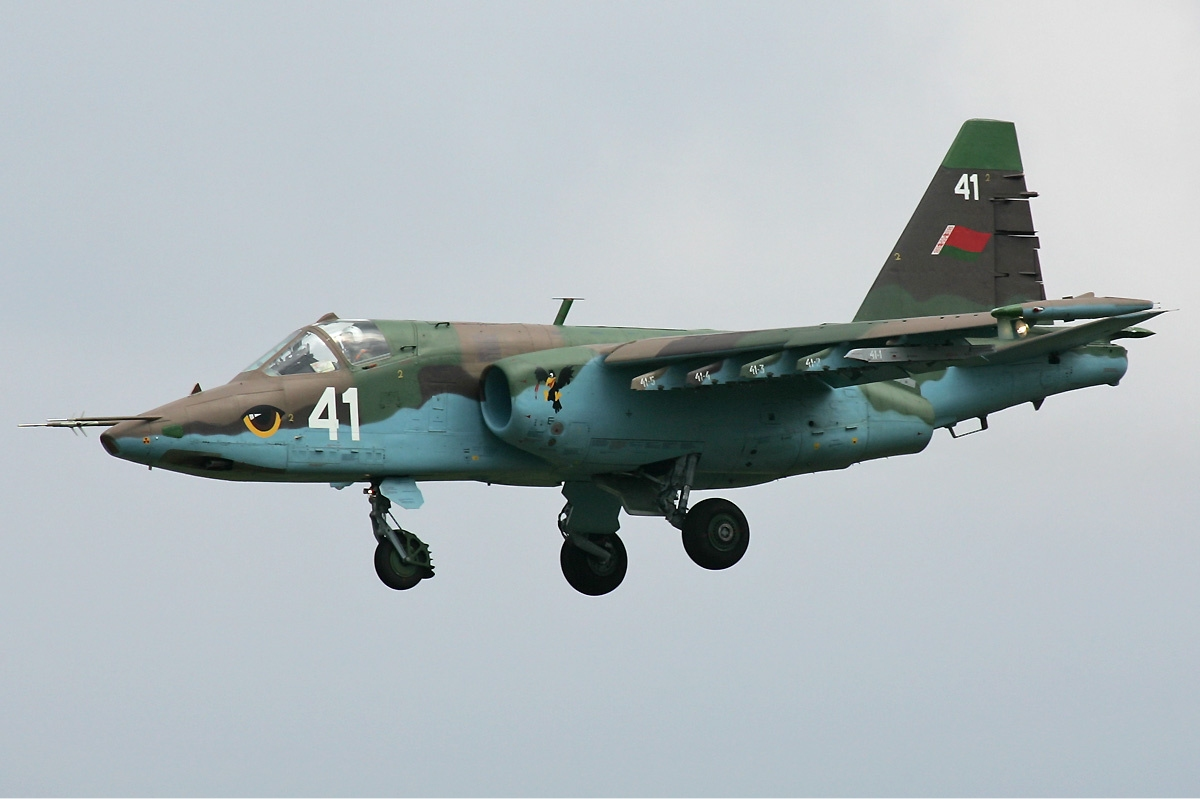
Belarusian Air Force Su-25

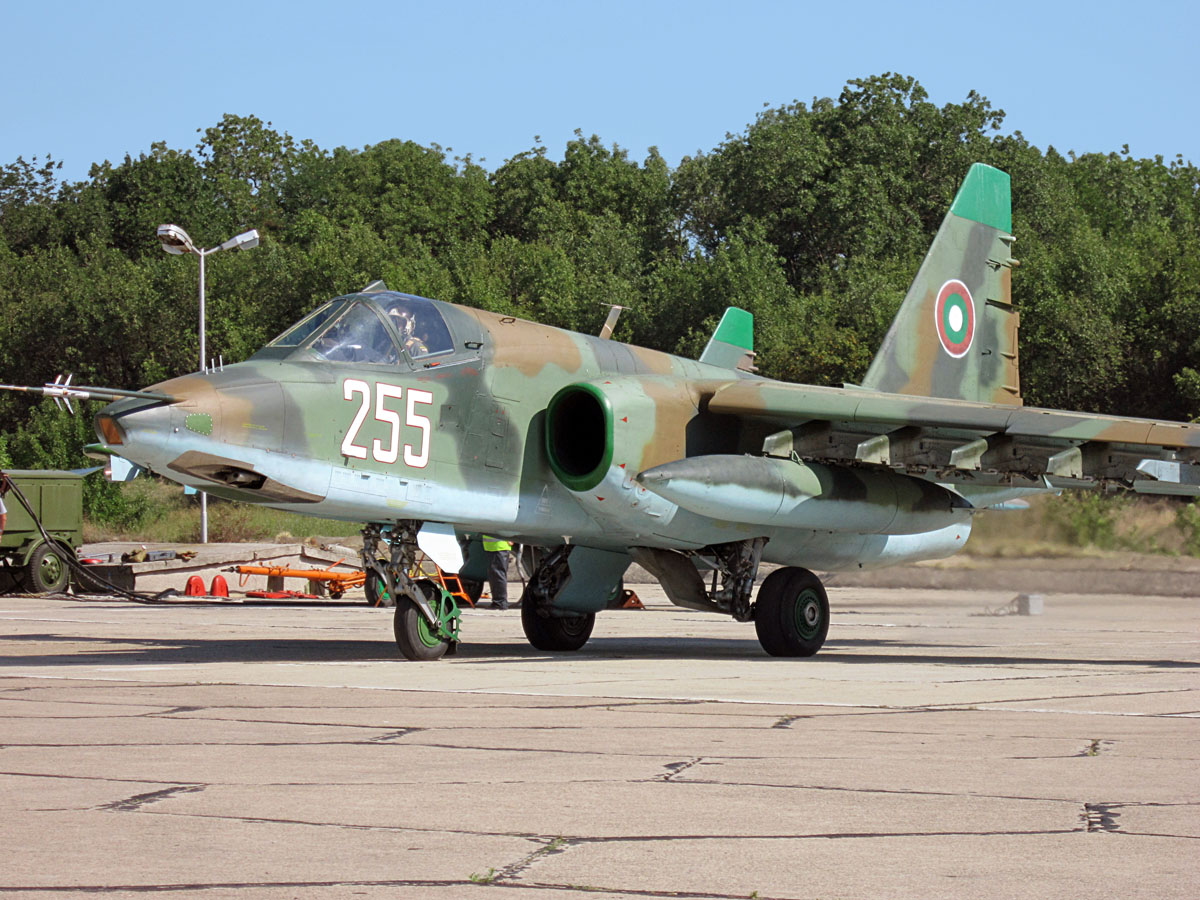
Bulgarian Air Force Su-25 at Bezmer Air Base in 2013

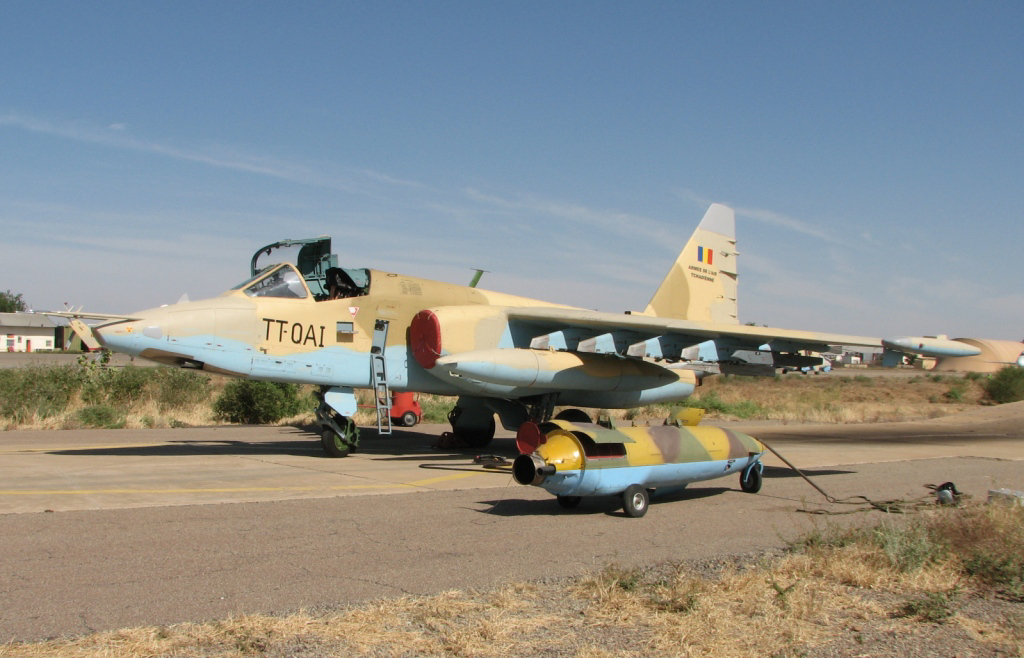
Chadian Air Force Su-25 at N'Djamena International Airport

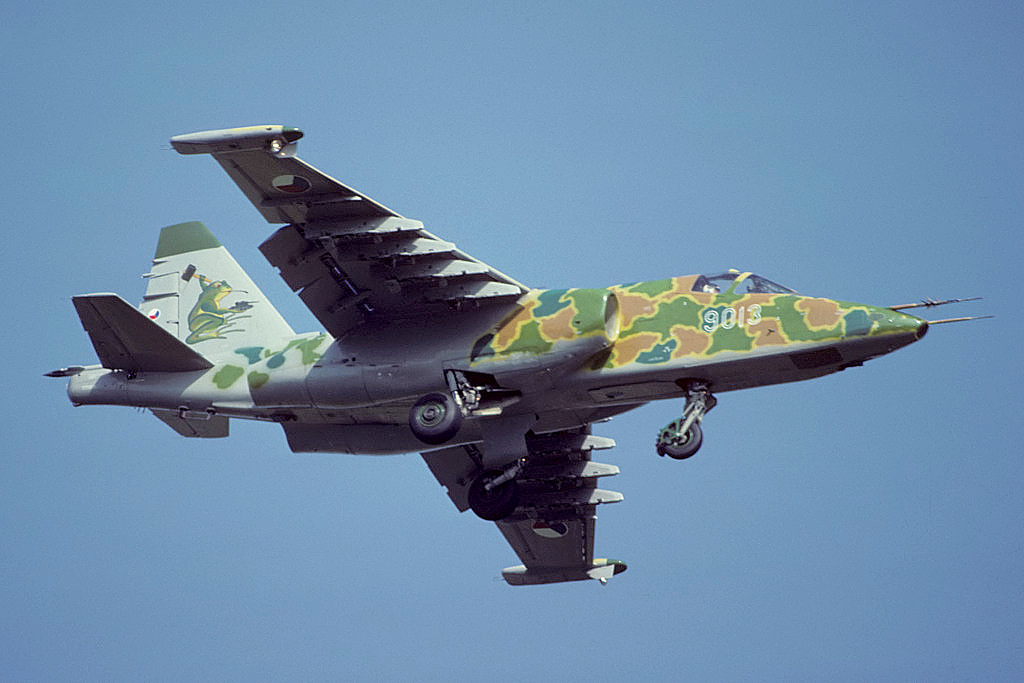
Czechoslovak Air Force Sukhoi Su-25K at Royal International Air Tattoo 1992

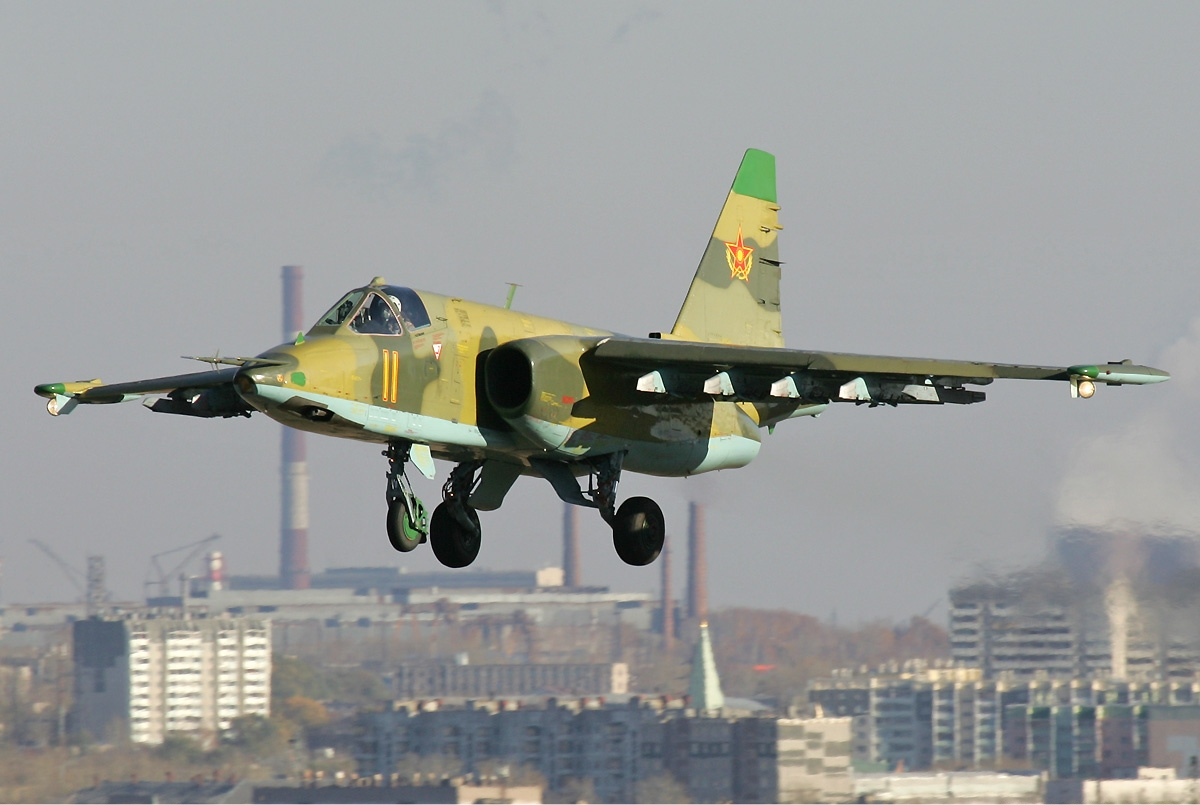
Kazakhstan Air Force Su-25

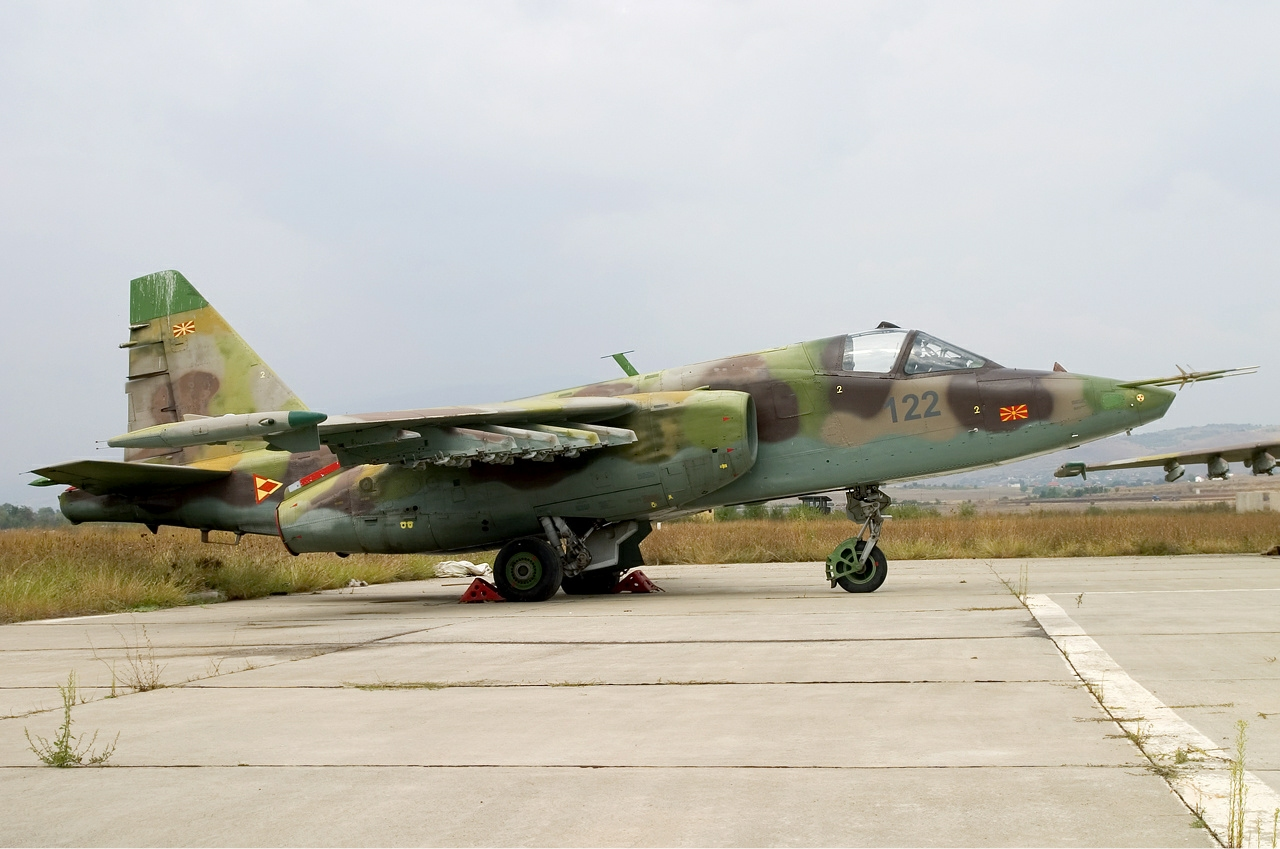
Macedonian Air Force Sukhoi Su-25

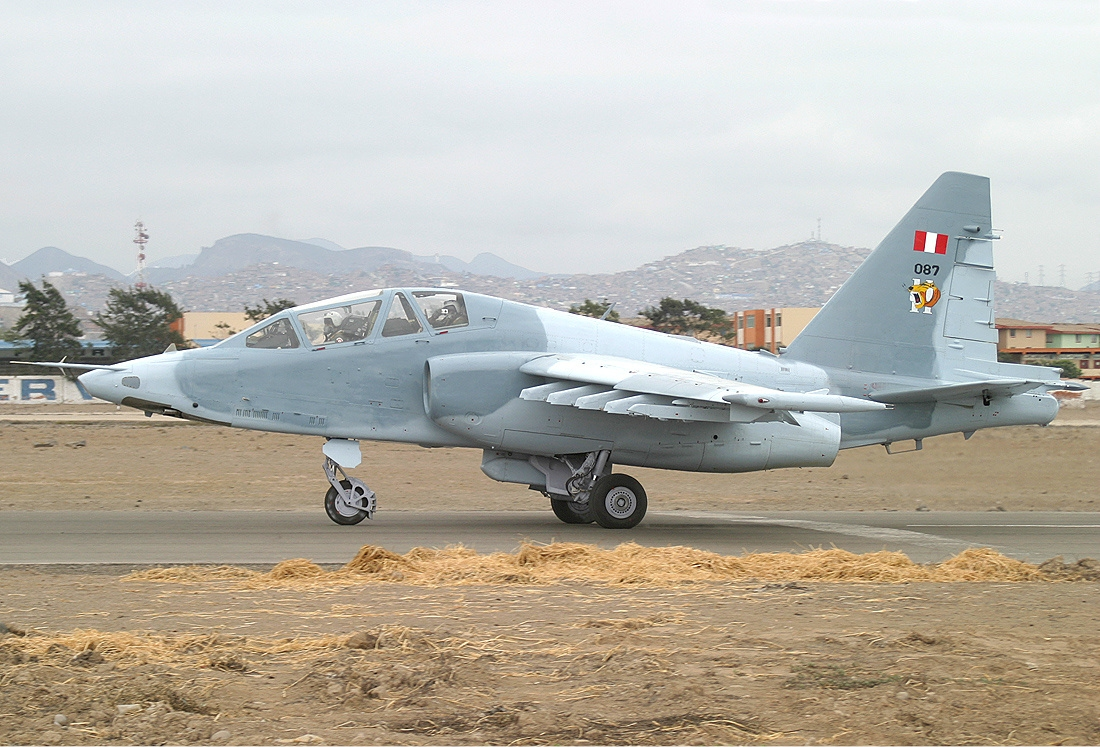
Peruvian Air Force Su-25

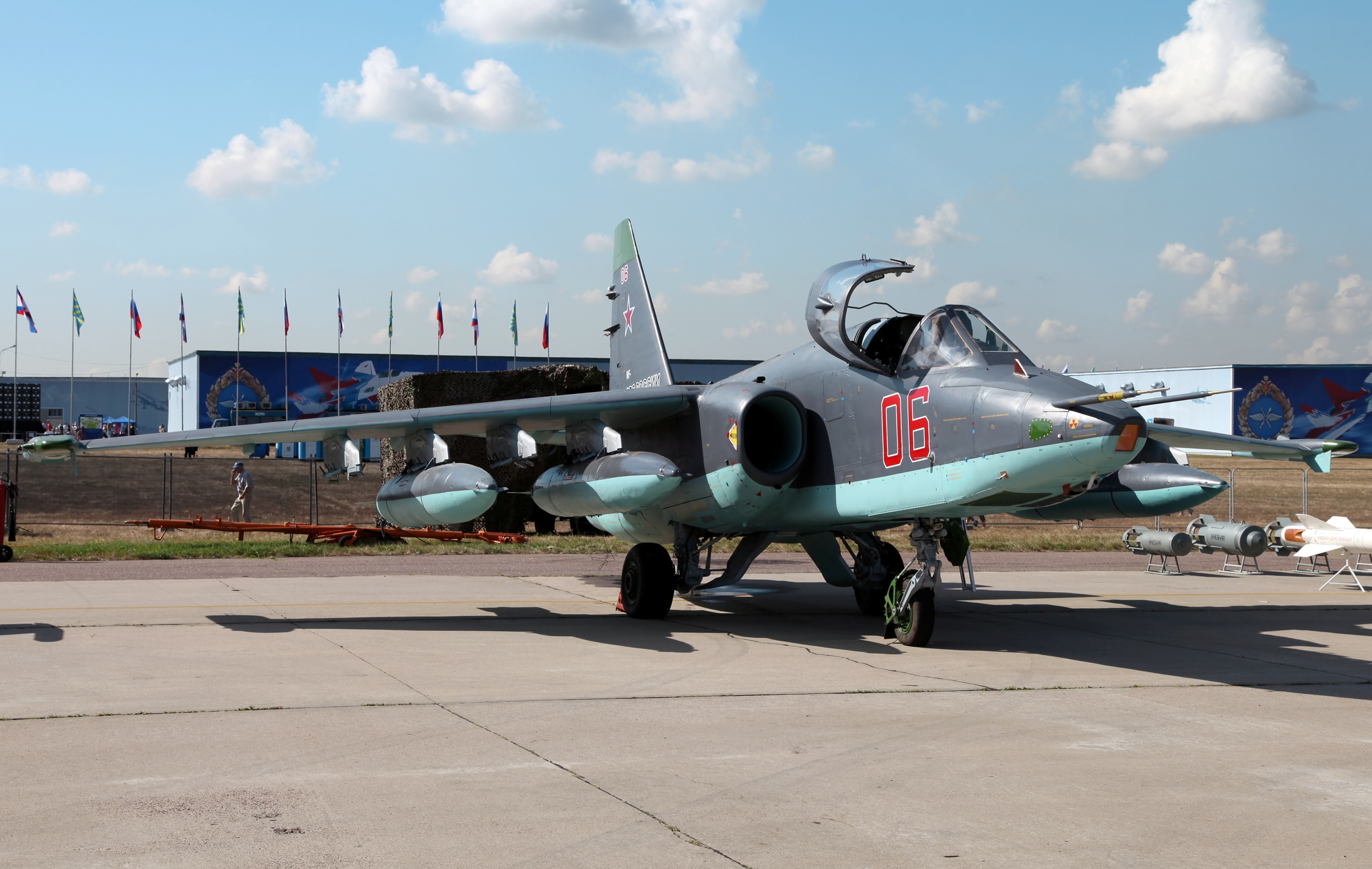
Russian Air Force Su-25SM

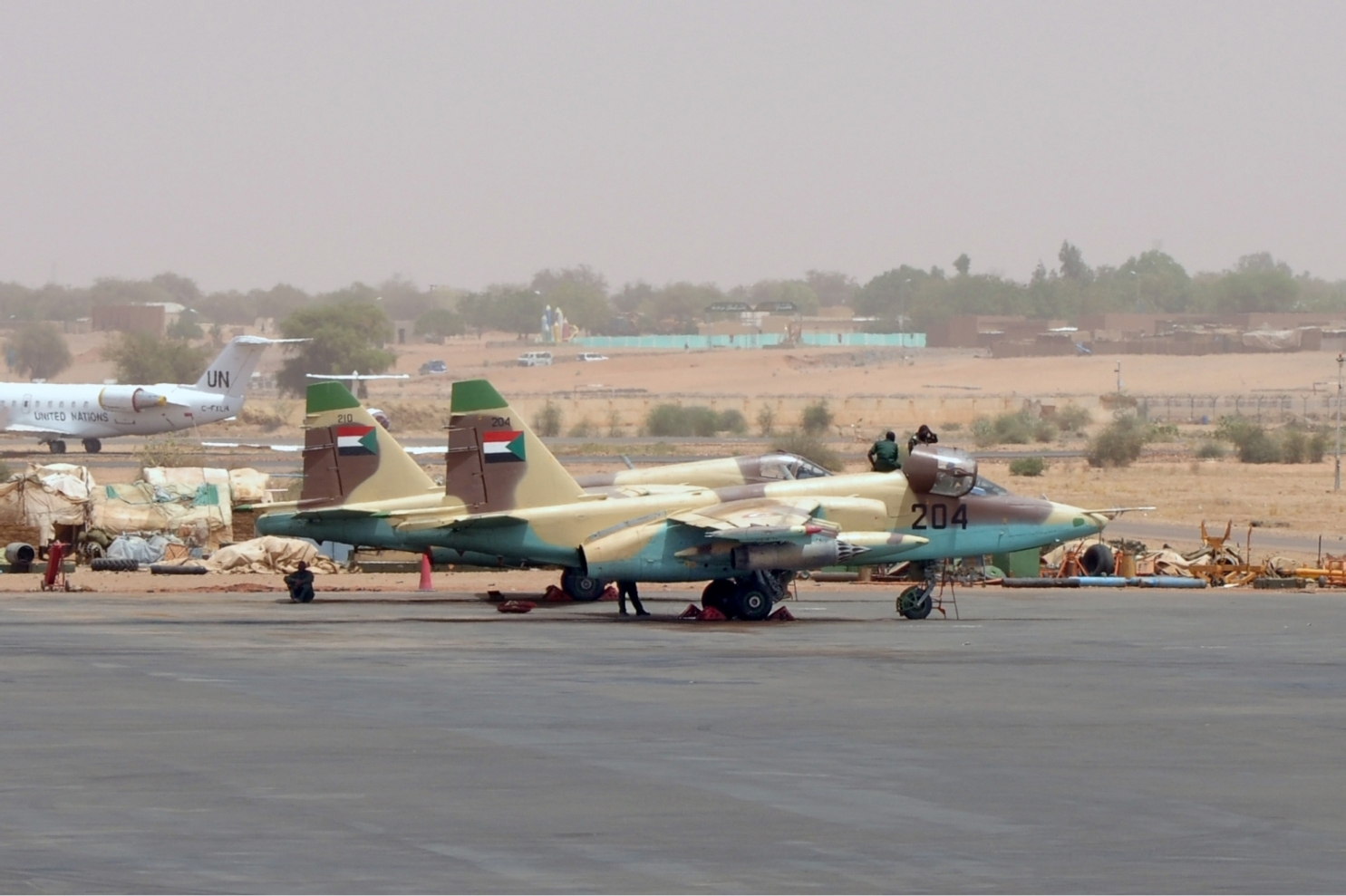
Sudanese Air Force Sukhoi Su-25s

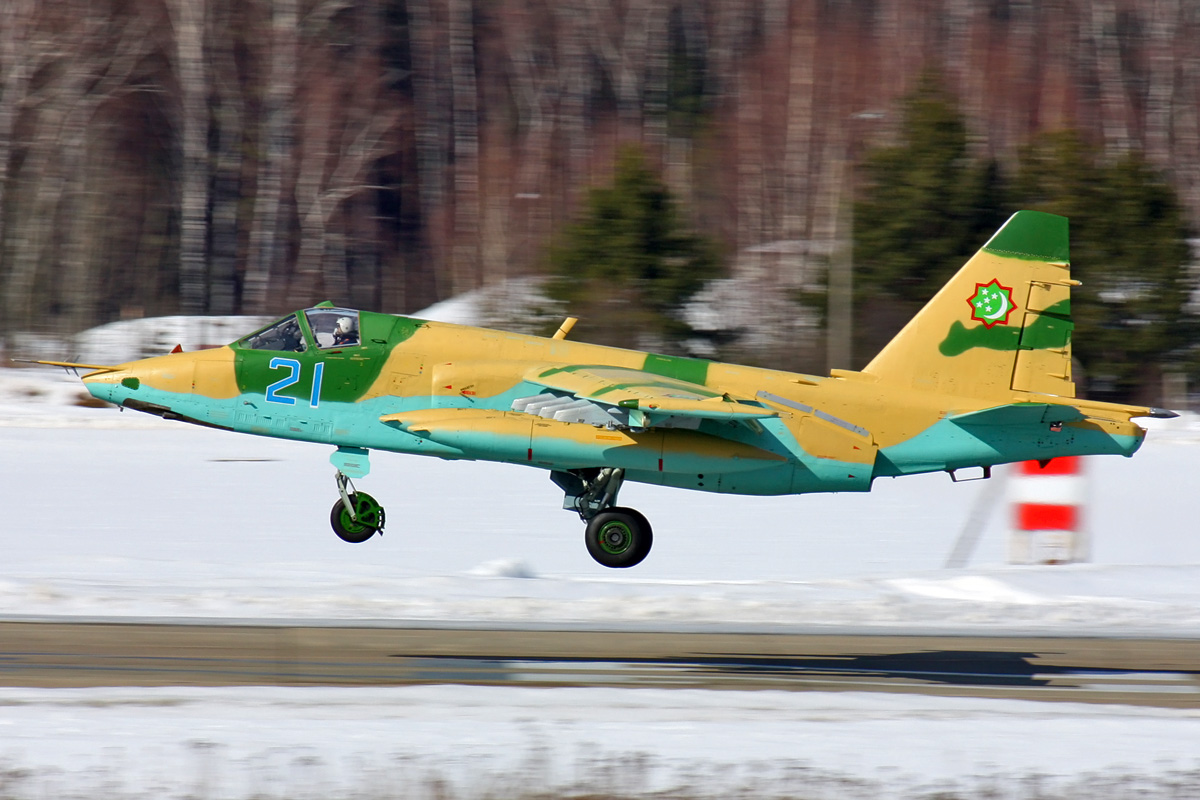
Turkmen Su-25

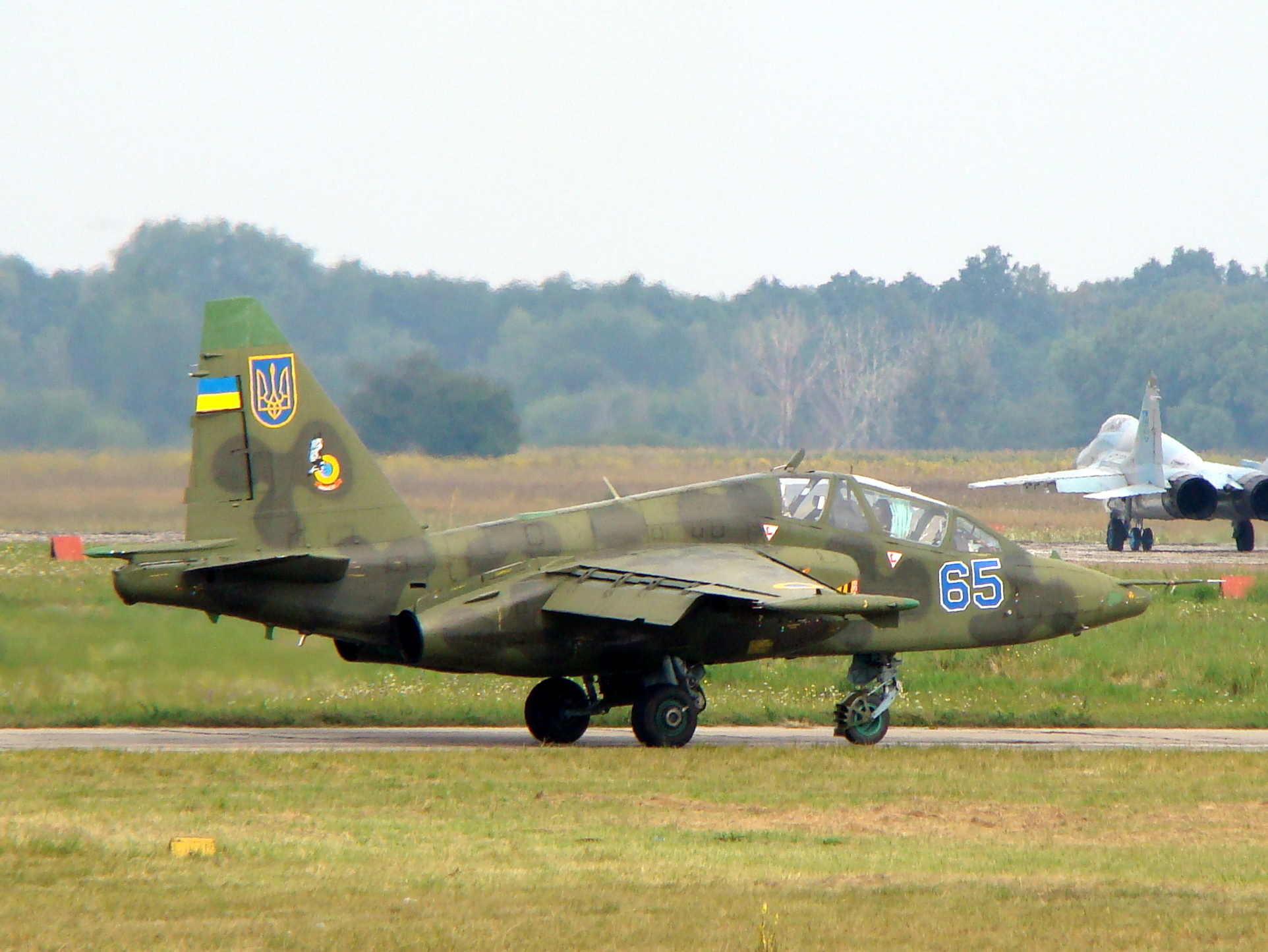
Ukrainian Su-25UB

Armenia
- Armenian Air Force. Following the break-up of the Soviet Union, Armenia had no Su-25s in its inventory. In 1992-1993, six Su-25Ks and two Su-25UBKs were delivered clandestinely from Russia as military aid. A new Su-25K was also stolen from the Georgian Air Force on 15 November 1993 by Georgian Captain Sergey Zhitnikov and flown to Armenia. Armenia operated five Su-25s, nine Su-25Ks and one Su-25UBK as of January 2009. According to a report by Russia-based think-tank, the Center for Analysis of Strategies and Technologies, Armenia shot down at least four of its own Su-25s during the 2020 Nagorno-Karabakh war. As of 2021, a total of 13 aircraft were reportedly still operational.

Azerbaijan
- Azerbaijan Air Force. Like Armenia, Azerbaijan did not inherit any Su-25s after the collapse of the USSR, but a single aircraft was obtained in April 1992 when a pilot defected from the Russian Air Force base at Sital-Chai. Following the incident, Azerbaijan acquired at least five Su-25s through unofficial channels, and one more aircraft has been obtained as the result of yet another defection, this time from the Georgian Air Force. Other aircraft are believed to have been acquired later, as a 2001 inventory of Azerbaijani aircraft revealed that the Azerbaijan Air Force had three Su-25s in its inventory, after the reported loss of four aircraft in combat operations relating to the disputed Nagorno-Karabakh region. As of 2021, 11 aircraft were reportedly operational.Starting in 2023, the Su-25s were modernized to the Su-25ML (Laçin) standard by Turkish Aerospace Industries.

Belarus
- Belarus Air Force. After the break-up of the Soviet Union, Belarus was the second member state of the CIS, after Russia, to have a significant number of Su-25s. Seventy Su-25s and six Su-25UBs were reported to be operational and were mostly concentrated at Lida air base by 2004. As of 2021, 67 Su-25s were reportedly in use. In 2022, Russian president Vladimir Putin announced a plan to make Belarusian jets nuclear capable.

Bulgaria
- Bulgarian Air Force. Bulgaria was the second Warsaw Pact country to obtain the Su-25, acquiring its first examples of both Su-25Ks and Su-25UBKs in 1985. The aircraft were intended to replace the obsolete Mikoyan-Gurevich MiG-17F which had been the backbone of the Bulgarian Air Force fighter-bomber fleet for many years. Twenty Su-25Ks and three Su-25UBKs were commissioned and were operational at Bezmer Air Base by 2004. As of 2021 only 14 are in active service. Eight of them were modernized in Belarus, and it is expected that all of them will be modernized at some point. In mid-2022 reports began appearing that some of Bulgaria's Su-25s had been purchased by other states that acted as intermediaries, and delivered to the Ukrainian Air Force. In a June 9, 2022, Facebook post, three aircraft were shown in Bulgarian markings, side numbers 002, 240, and 095. 5 Su-25K and 1 Su-25UBK in service as of 2025.

Chad
- The Chadian Air Force took delivery of six aircraft (four Su-25s and two Su-25UBs) from Ukraine between 2008 and 2010. Four additional aircraft were delivered from Ukraine in 2013.

Democratic Republic of the Congo
- Air Force of the Democratic Republic of the Congo. In 1999-2000, four factory-fresh Su-25s were delivered by Tbilisi Aircraft Manufacturing to the DR Congo. These aircraft were used in combat during the Second Congo War until 2003 and possibly afterwards. One aircraft crashed in December 2006 during a routine flight, while another crashed on 30 June 2007, during a Congolese independence day display. Two additional aircraft were delivered from Ukraine in 2013. As of 2021, four aircraft were operational. In 2023, one aircraft was damaged in a missile attack. In 2026, one aircraft was destroyed in a crash incident.

Equatorial Guinea
- In 2005, four Su-25s including two Su-25UB combat trainers were delivered to the Equatorial Guinea Air Corps. They were still operational as of 2021.

Ethiopia
- Ethiopian Air Force. A pair of Su-25Ts and two Su-25UB combat trainers were ordered by Ethiopia in 1999, and delivered in January 2000. All four were former Russian Air Force aircraft. They were overhauled before delivery, and received the designations Su-25TK and Su-25UBK respectively. These aircraft were used in combat during the Eritrean-Ethiopian War, and one was written off in an accident. After only one year in service, they were withdrawn and placed into storage. Around 2010, a decision was made to reactivate the three remaining aircraft, and they were shown in 2013 after being overhauled locally. As of 2026, one aircraft remains in service.

Georgia
- Georgian Air Force. Georgia, home to Tbilisi Aircraft Manufacturing which produced scores of single-seat Su-25s during the Soviet era, was left with virtually no aircraft following the break-up of the Soviet Union. Only a small number of single-seat Su-25s were actually brought into the inventory of the newly formed Georgian Air Force (now army air force), these aircraft having been left in the factory at the time of Georgian independence. Georgia had nine Su-25s of different variants, with eight of them being Su-25KM "Scorpion"s (an upgraded variant of the Su-25 designed in collaboration with Israel) as of 2004. The current Su-25 fleet is undergoing a refurbishment and modernisation process by Tbilisi Aircraft Manufacturing, and as of 2021 four Su-25s were completely restored and fitted with state-of-the-art electronics. That year, 10 aircraft were cited as operational.

Iraq
- Iraqi Air Force. During the course of the early phase of the Iran–Iraq War, Iraq approached the Soviet Union with a request to purchase a wide variety of military equipment. As a result, Iraq became the first non-Warsaw Pact country to obtain Su-25Ks and Su-25UBK combat trainers. It is believed that Iraq received a total of 73 examples, of which four were Su-25UBKs. In January 1998, the Iraqi Air Force still possessed 12 Su-25s, and at least three Su-25Ks were seen in a demonstration over Baghdad in December 2002. However, the remaining Su-25s were phased out immediately after the 2003 Invasion of Iraq. In 2014, the IQAF signed a deal with Russia and Belarus for the purchase of new examples, with the first five arriving on 28 June 2014. in 2014 Reports indicate that a further thirteen were delivered from Iran on 1 July 2014, seven of them were ex-Iraqi examples from the 1991 Gulf War.

Kazakhstan
- Kazakh Air Defense Forces – received 12 single-seat Su-25s and two Su-25UB trainers in December 1995 as compensatory payment for the return of the Tu-95MS strategic bombers which had been rapidly flown out of the republic at the time of the collapse of the USSR. The Kazakh Su-25s are located at Chimkent air base in the south of the country. 14 aircraft were reportedly still operational as of 2021.

Niger
- Niger Air Force – two Su-25s delivered from Ukraine in 2013, still operational as of 2021.

North Korea
- North Korean Air Force – In the 1950s, the North Korean Air Force had accumulated experience operating the Su-25's piston-engined predecessor, the Ilyushin Il-10. In the period from the end of 1987 until 1989, the DPRK acquired a total of 34 single-seat Su-25Ks. The aircraft are based at Sunchon Airport (20 km from Pyongyang), which features heavily fortified natural hangars equipped with blast-proof doors capable of protecting the aircraft from conventional and nuclear explosions.

Peru
- Peruvian Air Force. Peru received 18 Su-25s in late 1998 from Belarus, which refurbished them prior to delivery. Their acquisition came at a time of tensions with neighboring Ecuador, in the aftermath of the 1995 Cenepa War. The shipment comprised 10 single-seat and eight dual-seat Su-25UB aircraft. The aircraft were all built just before the collapse of the Soviet Union and thus represented the final versions of the Soviet Su-25. It is believed that between 1998 and December 2005, at least 25 light aircraft transporting cocaine have been shot down by the Peruvian Su-25s. As of February 2013, 18 Su-25s were in service, with only four aircraft operational. A project aiming to overhaul and return to service a total of six single-seat and four two-seat Su-25s is ongoing, with the first overhauled aircraft having been delivered in 2018. As of July 2022, the delivery of the fifth aircraft was expected in the near future.

Russia
- Russian Aerospace Forces – Russia's reduced fleet of Su-25s is operated by assault aviation (штурмовой авиационный, literally ground-attack aviation) regiments. The major variants used are the single-seat Su-25, the twin-seat Su-25UB, and the Su-25BM target-towing version. In addition, the Russian Air Force received a small number of the Su-25T anti-tank variant, which has been tested under combat conditions in Chechnya. Overall, 286 Su-25s were in service with the Russian Air Force as of 2008. A modernisation programme of single-seat Su-25s to the Su-25SM variant is underway. The first modernised Su-25SM was delivered in August 2001. The modernisation programme is to conclude in 2020 with over 80 examples upgraded. As of 2021, 192 Su-25s were operational with the Russian Aerospace Forces, and four with the Naval Aviation. As of 2026 Russian Aerospace Forces and Russian Naval Aviation operate 183 Su-25 of all variants.

- 18th Guards Assault Aviation Regiment, 11th Air and Air Defence Forces Army, Eastern Military District
- 368th Assault Aviation Regiment, 4th Air and Air Defence Forces Army, Southern Military District
- 899th Assault Aviation Regiment, 16th Air Army, Moscow Military District (disbanded 2009)
- 960th Assault Aviation Regiment, Primorsko-Akhtarsk, 4th Air and Air Defence Forces Army, Southern Military District
- 999th Aviation Base, Kant, Kyrgyzstan

- Russian Naval Aviation – the Russian Navy operates an adapted version of the Su-25UB two-seat trainer, the Su-25UTG. This is a carrier-capable version used to carry out deck-landing training aboard the Russian aircraft carrier Admiral Kuznetsov.
- Wagner PMC

Sudan
- Sudanese Air Force – 14 former Belarusian Air Force Su-25s delivered in 2008-2009, with 10 more acquired in 2013 from the same source.

Turkmenistan
- Turkmen Air Force – Following the downfall of the Soviet Union, the newly independent Turkmenistan was given 46 Su-25s which had been disassembled for storage in Turkmenistan at that time. In accordance with an agreement between Georgia and Turkmenistan in 1999, the Tbilisi Aircraft Manufacturing corporation refurbished 45 of these aircraft for use by the Turkmenistan Air Force as payment for the delivery of natural gas. The refurbished aircraft were relocated at Ak-Tepe air base, and a total of 18 operational Su-25s were known to be based there by 2004. 20 aircraft were operational as of 2021.

Ukraine
- Ukrainian Air Force. Ukraine obtained 92 Su-25s of different variants following the country's independence in the wake of the break-up of the USSR. As of 2004, the Ukrainian Air Force operated approximately 60 Su-25s, Su-25UBs and Su-25UTGs, with the 299th Independent Assault Regiment (299 OShAP) based at Kulbakino Air Base, Mykolaiv Oblast, and the 456th Assault Regiment (456 ShAP) at Chortkiv Air Base. Up to 30 Su-25s were reportedly stored at the 4070th Reserve Base. Evidently, the three Su-25s sold to Macedonia came from this reserve pool. Ukraine's two carrier-capable Su-25UTGs were retired in 2007: one was given to Russia in exchange for a standard Su-25UB, while the other was sold to China. Some of the Ukrainian Air Force's aircraft have been modernized: the modernized single-seaters are designated Su-25M1, and the two-seat trainers Su-25UBM1. The first three upgraded aircraft were delivered in 2010. At the outbreak of the war in Donbas, the Ukrainian Air Force had a fleet of around 70 Su-25s, but only about 15 were considered flyable. During the first two months of the conflict, between six and ten more Su-25s were made airworthy. In 2022,14 Su-25 have reportedly been received indirectly from a third party with the aircraft originating from the Bulgarian Air force. As of 2022, 31 aircraft were operational.

- 299th Tactical Aviation Brigade

- Ukrainian Naval Aviation - Former operator.

Uzbekistan
- Until 1990, a Soviet Air Force pilot training centre equipped with around 20 Su-25, Su-25UB, and Su-25BM variants was located at Chirchik air base in Uzbekistan. In 1991, a small number of Su-25s were also located at Dzhizak air base, but after 1991, all Su-25s in Uzbekistan were concentrated at Chirchik, operated by the 59th Fighter-Bomber Aviation Regiment (59 APIB) of the Soviet Air Force. After the collapse of the Soviet Union, all the Su-25s on the territory of the now-independent republic became the property of the new government. 20 aircraft were operational as of 2021.

== Former operators ==
Abkhazia

- Abkhazian Air Force

Angola
- National Air Force of Angola. An agreement was reached at the beginning of 1988 between the Soviet Union and Angola that arranged for the delivery of a squadron of Su-25s. The Angolan export agreement comprised 12 single-seat Su-25Ks and two Su-25UBK trainers. Later, these aircraft were augmented by further deliveries comprising at least three two-seater aircraft. As of 2021, 12 aircraft were reportedly still operational. In 2025, all Su-25 were withdrawn from service.

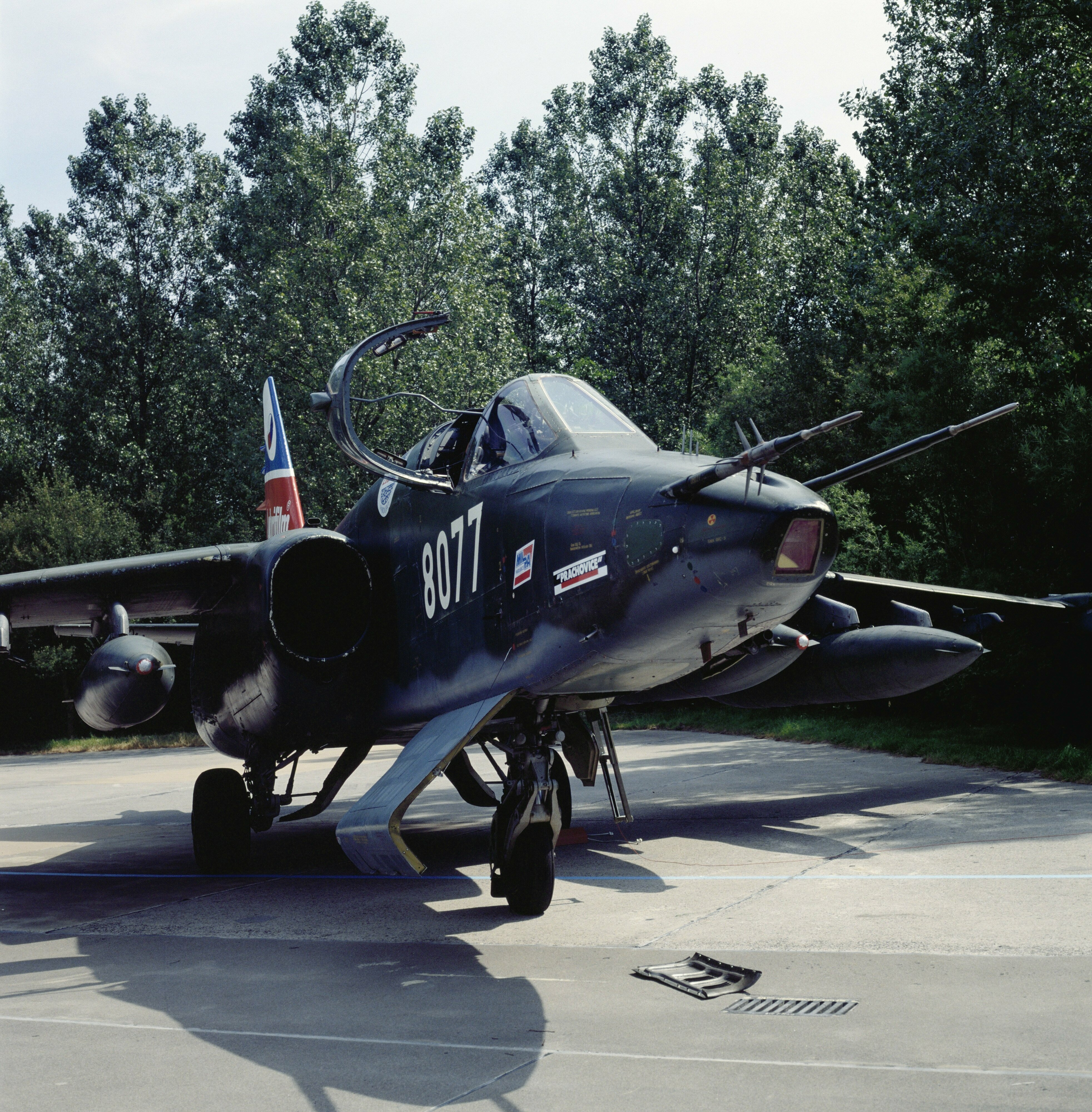
Czech Republic Su-25K in 1994.

Czechoslovakia
- Czechoslovak Air Force. Passed aircraft on to successor states, in the ratio of 2:1 in favour of the Czech Republic.
Czech Republic
- Czech Air Force. After the dissolution of Czechoslovakia, the Czech Republic inherited twenty-four Su-25Ks and one Su-25UBK. In December 2000, the Czech Su-25s were retired from service. 12 of the withdrawn Su-25s were sold to Georgia in the early 2000s.
Gambia
- Gambian Army – operated one Su-25 as of 2008. As of 2026 the Gambian Armed Forces possess no combat aircraft.
Iran
- Islamic Revolutionary Guards Corps Air Force. On 21 January 1991, seven Iraqi Su-25s were flown to Iran in an effort to find a temporary safe haven from Operation Desert Storm attacks on major Iraqi airfields. These aircraft were considered by Iran to be a gift from its former adversary, and were seized by the Iranian military. However, as a result of a lack of spare parts, documentation, and pilot training, these aircraft were not flown by the Islamic Republic of Iran Air Force. Iran has added at least six new examples to its inventory and has since likely restored ex-Iraqi Su-25s to flight status as well. Reports indicate that all of the IRGCAF aircraft have been sold to Iraq in July 2014, to increase the latter's for CAS and COIN for fighting against ISIS capabilities.

Ivory Coast
- Air Force of Ivory Coast. Four aircraft, including two trainers, were purchased from Belarus in 2004. In November, nine French soldiers were killed and 23 wounded when two Ivorian Su-25s bombed French positions in Bouaké. As a result, French soldiers destroyed the Su-25s on the ground at Yamoussoukro air base.

Mali
- Malian Air Force – at least one Su-25 delivered by Russia in August 2022. A Malian Su-25 crashed on 4 October 2022.

North Macedonia
- North Macedonia Air Brigade. The Republic of Macedonia purchased three single-seat Su-25s and one Su-25UB following incursions and attacks by Albanian insurgents. The aircraft were supplied by Ukraine after having been withdrawn from Ukrainian Air Force service. The aircraft were retired in 2004. In 2023 all four Su-25s returned to Ukraine after they were donated by North Macedonia.

Slovakia
- The Slovak Air Force received 12 Su-25Ks and one Su-25UBK following the dissolution of Czechoslovakia. The aircraft were based at the Slovak 33rd Air Base in Malacky-Kuchyna. 10 Su-25Ks and one Su-25UBK were sold to Armenia in 2004.

Soviet Union
- Soviet Air Force. Passed aircraft on to successor states.

== Evaluation-only operators ==
China
- Bought one carrier-capable Su-25UTG from Ukraine in 2007.
