= 14th Air Army =

14th Air Army (1988–1994) Air Forces of the Carpathian Military District (1980–1988) 14th Air Army (1968–1980) 57th Air Army (1949–1968) 14th Air Army (1942–1949)
- Active: 1942–1994
- Country: Soviet Union; Ukraine
- Branch: Soviet Air Forces; Ukrainian Air Force
- Part of: Carpathian Military District (from 1945)
- Garrison/HQ: Lvov (from 1945)
- Engagements: World War II
- Decorations: Order of the Red Banner

Commanders
- Notable commanders: Ivan Zhuravlyov; Vasily Ryazanov; Sergei Goryunov; Konstantin Vershinin

The 14th Air Army was an air army of the Soviet Air Forces during World War II and the Cold War and of the Ukrainian Air Force in the early Post-Soviet period.

== Soviet period ==
The Army was first formed from the Air Forces of the Volkhov Front in June 1942, and in 1943 participated in the Novgorod-Luga operation. In February 1944 it was dispersed, with the command staff assigned to the Reserve of the Supreme High Command (RVGK) and its units to other air armies. Reformed in April 1944, when it served with the 3rd Baltic Front, it was again dispersed in November 1944, with its staff again been allocated to the Stavka Reserve and its units to other formations. It was active on 1 May 1945 with the 107th Air Signals Regiment and the 30th Air Regiment of the Civil Air Fleet (Aeroflot), as part of the RVGK. However it became the 57th Air Army on 10 January 1949. 57th Air Army was included in 1964 Warsaw Pact war planning, being planned to be moved forward from the Carpathian Military District to become part of the Czechoslovak Front if war broke out between NATO and the Warsaw Pact. Reformed from the 57th Air Army in April 1968, and awarded the Order of the Red Banner, the 14th Air Army (which seems to have had the Military Unit Number 18466 from this point on at least) was serving in the Carpathian Military District when the Soviet Union fell. In 1988-91 it consisted of the 4th Fighter Aviation Division (two MiG-29 regiments, 92nd and 145th Fighter Aviation Regiments in 1990) (Ivano-Frankovsk), the 289th Bomber Aviation Division (two Su-24 regiments)(Lutsk), a regiment of Su-25s (Chortkov), a reconnaissance regiment of MiG-25s (48 GvORAP at Kolomyia (air base), Ivano-Frankivsk Oblast?), a mixed regiment of transport aircraft (Lvov), and a helicopter electronic squadron.

== Under the Ukrainian flag ==
Its units became part of the Ukrainian armed forces after the Dissolution of the Soviet Union on 25 December 1991. The formation was reorganized as the 14th Air Corps in accordance with an order of the Ministry of Defense dated 2 March 1994. In mid-1994 a regiment remained flying the Yak-28 Brewer-E at Chortkiv.

In 2001, it included the 6th Fighter Aviation Division at Ivano-Frankivsk with the 9th (Ozerne) and 114th (Ivano-Frankivsk) Fighter Aviation Regiments and the 289th Bomber Aviation Division at Lutsk with the 806th (Lutsk) and 947th (Dubno) Bomber Aviation Regiments. An additional regiment, the 69th Bomber Aviation Regiment at Ovruch South-West listed as part of the division by Air Forces Monthly in March 1994, had by that time disappeared. All three regiments had flown the Sukhoi Su-24 (ASCC "Fencers"). The 452nd Independent Assault Aviation Regiment at Chortkiv (Su-25), 48th Independent Reconnaissance Aviation Regiment at Kolomyia (in 1994 with the Su-24MR and MiG-25R), and 243rd Separate Mixed Aviation Regiment at Lvov (Mi-6, Mi-8) were directly subordinate to corps headquarters.

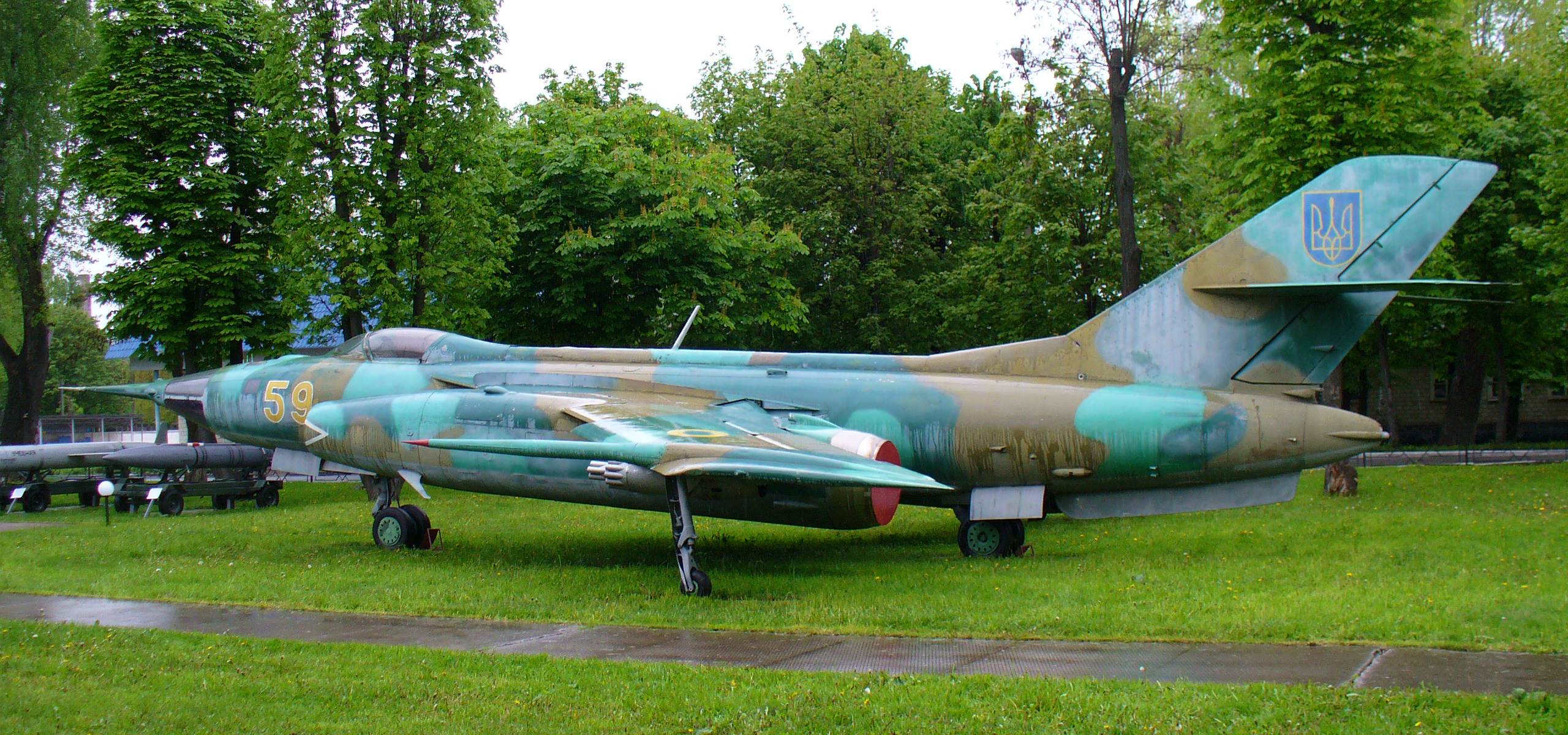
Electronic warfare version of the YAK-28 as flown by the 118th Independent Aviation Regiment Electronic Warfare at Chortkiv, since retired to the Air Force Museum.

On 27 July 2002, 77 people were killed and around 300 wounded when a Su-27 crashed in the Sknyliv airshow disaster, held to commemorate the 60th anniversary of the 14th Air Army. As a result of the accident, corps commander Lieutenant General Serhiy Onyshchenko was transferred and corps deputy commander Major General Anatoly Tretyakov was sentenced to six years in prison, but was released early in 2007. In accordance with an order of the Commander of the Ukrainian Air Force dated 2 December 2004, the corps was disbanded and its units transferred to the new Air Command West.

== Commanders ==
- Lieutenant-General Ivan Petrovich Zhuravlev, 27.7.42 - 2.47
- Lieutenant-General Vasiliy Georgievich Ryazanov, 2.47 - 4.49
- Colonel-General Sergey Kondratevich Goryunov, 4.49 - 2.50
- Chief Marshal of Aviation Konstantin Vershinin, 2.50 - 9.50
- Colonel-General Vasliliy Vasilevich Stepichev, 9.50 - 1.53
- Lieutenant-General David Yakovlevich Slobozhan, 1.53 - 9.53
- Colonel-General Vasliliy Vasilevich Stepichev, 9.53 - 2.56
- Colonel-General Fedor Petrovich Polynin, 2.56 - 8.59
