= 116th Guards Assault Air Base =

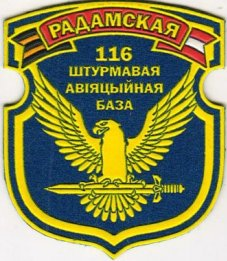
- Active: 2010
- Country: Belarus
- Branch: Belarusian Air Force
- Garrison/HQ: Lida

Commanders
- Current commander: Colonel Alexander Krivets

The 116th Guards Assault Aviation Radomskaya Red Banner Base (Belarusian: 116-я гвардзейская штурмавая авіяцыйная Радамская Чырвонасцяжная база; Russian: 116-я гвардейская штурмовая авиационная Радомская Краснознамённая база) is a compound of the Belarusian Air Force. The place of deployment is Lida.

== History ==
The unit was formed as the 563rd Fighter Aviation Regiment of a two-squadron composition near Moscow in the fall of 1941. On 3 September 1943, it was reorganized into the 116th Guards Fighter Aviation Regiment. On 8 October 1943, the unit was awarded the Order of the Red Banner. In February 1945, the 116th IAP was given the honorary name "Radomsky" for covering Red Army forces during combat missions to capture the Polish city of Radom. In 1982, the 116th Guards received brand new Su-24's of the Soviet Air Forces.

In connection with the signing of the Treaty on Conventional Armed Forces in Europe, the summer of 1989 the regiment was relocated from the Brand Airfield to Ross Airfield in the Grodno Region of the Byelorussian Soviet Socialist Republic as part of the Belarusian Military District, becoming part of the 1st Guards Bomber Division.

In July 1992, the regiment became part of the Belarusian Air Force, with personnel taking an oath of allegiance to the new republic.

During reforms of the Air Force, it was reorganized into the 116th Guards Bomber Aviation Base with the preservation of all its Soviet era awards and honorary titles.

== Equipment ==
- Sukhoi Su-25
- Aero L-39 Albatros
- Yakovlev Yak-130
