= Baranovichi (air base) =

Air base in Belarus

Baranovichi
- Baranavichy, Brest Region in Belarus
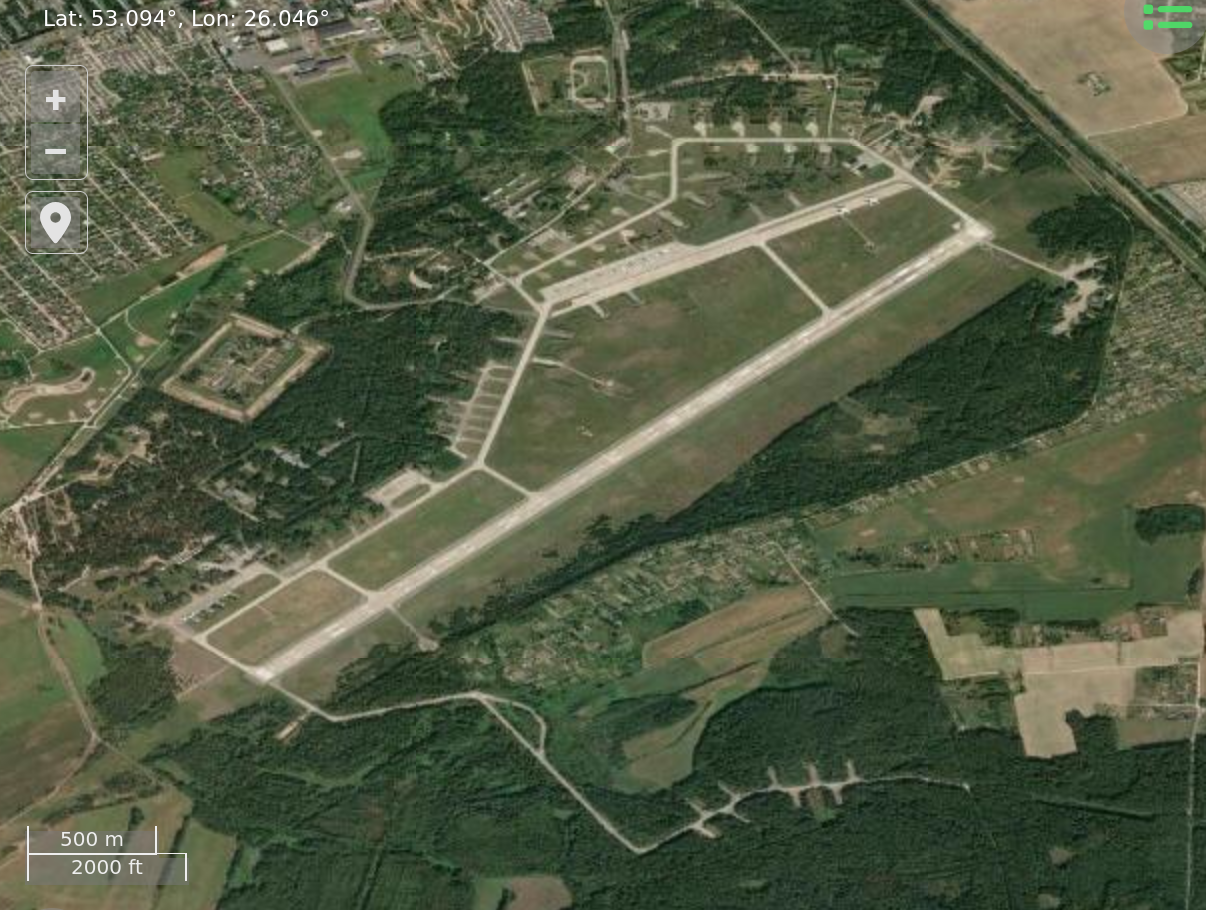
- Satellite imagery of Baranovichi air base

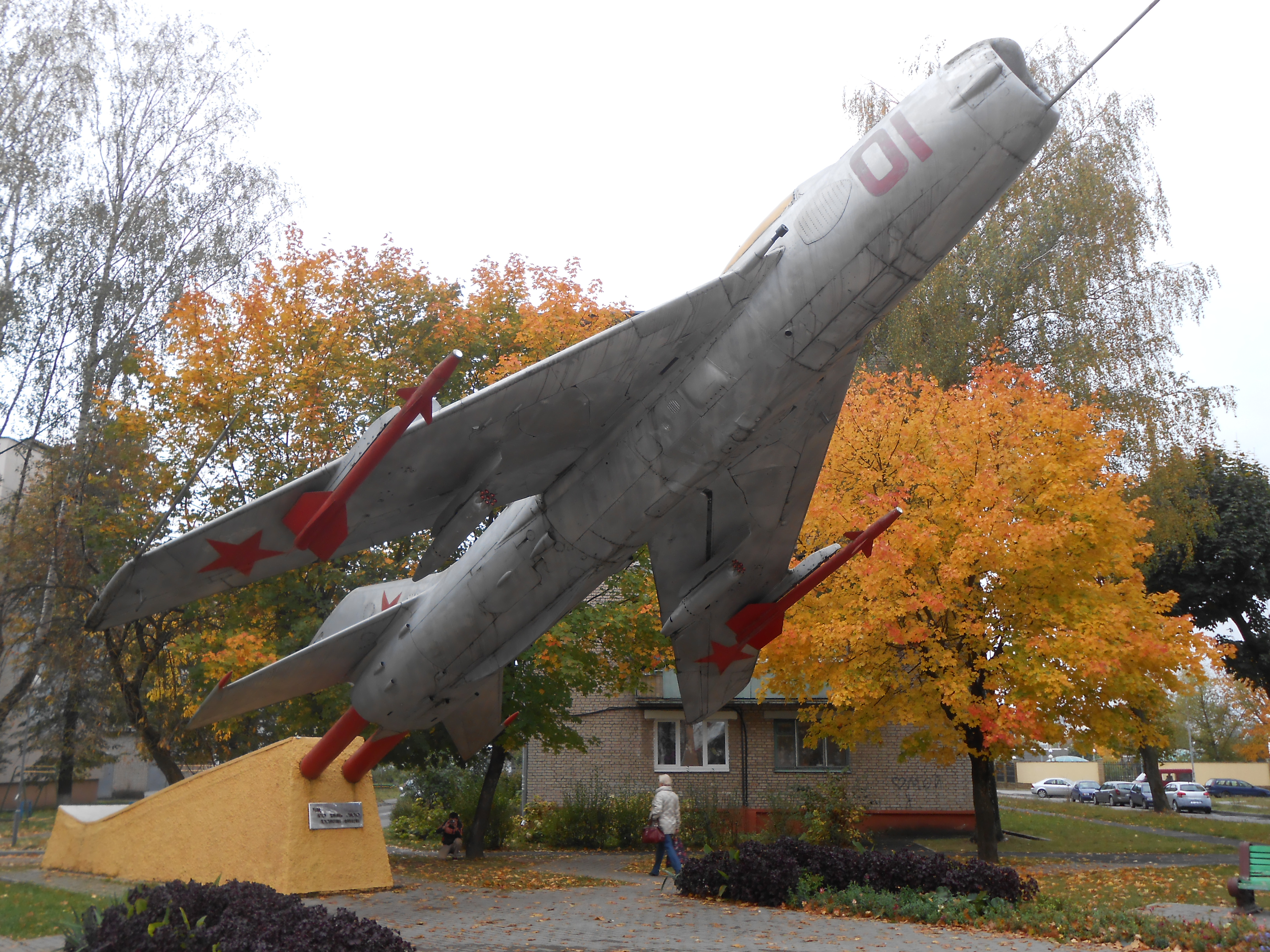

Site information
- Owner: Ministry of Defence of the Republic of Belarus
- Operator: Air Force and Air Defence Forces of the Republic of Belarus

Location
- Shown within Belarus
- Coordinates: 53°5′40″N 26°2′45″E

Site history
- Built: 1950
- In use: 1950 - present
- Battles/wars: 2022 Russian invasion of Ukraine

Airfield information
- Identifiers: ICAO: UMMA
- Elevation: 183 metres (600 ft) AMSL
Runways
Direction	Length and surface
04/22	3,000 metres (9,843 ft) Concrete

Baranovichi is an air base of the Air Force and Air Defence Forces of the Republic of Belarus and formerly of the Soviet Air Force. It has the ICAO airport code UMMA.

It is home to the 61st Fighter Air Base, flying Mikoyan-Gurevich MiG-29s, and Sukhoi Su-30s.

It is located to the south of the city of Baranovichi. In 1950 the 61st Fighter Aviation Regiment of the Soviet Air Defence Forces' 2nd Air Defence Army was established at the base. The base has been in major use since November 7, 1951 when it received the 45th Heavy Bomber Aviation Division and 203rd TBAP and became one of the prime strategic bomber base of the early 1950s. Holm confirms the 45th TBAD arrived in November 1951, but gives the receiving base's coordinates as 53 5 51N, 26 2 50E. The 45th TBAD was under the 79th Guards Bomber Aviation Corps, and later the 50th Air Army. It conducted numerous Tupolev Tu-16A sorties to the high arctic starting in the mid 1950s. It also deployed a Tu-16 to Tiksi and onward to ice station SP-6 for field trials in 1958.

Baronovichi was one of nine major operating locations for the Tupolev Tu-22 Blinder in the mid-1960s, which had an anti-surface warfare role in the Baltic Sea well into the 1980s. Baronovichi also hosted an interceptor regiment flying Mikoyan MiG-25 Foxbat aircraft in the 1980s.

Several Sukhoi Su-35S of the 23rd Fighter Aviation Regiment (23 IAP) from Dzyomgi Airport of the Russian Air Force were deployed to Baranovichi between February and April 2022. They flew sorties in the Russian invasion of Ukraine before withdrawing to Russia during the retreat from Kyiv.
