= 2nd Separate Air Defense Army =

- Active: 1960–1980; 1986–1992
- Country: Soviet Union
- Branch: Soviet Air Defence Forces
- Type: Air defense
- Headquarters: Minsk
- Decorations: Order of the Red Banner

Commanders
- Notable commanders: Vladimir Lavrinenkov

The 2nd Separate Air Defense Army (Russian: 2-я отдельная армия ПВО (2 ОА ПВО)) was an army of the Soviet Air Defense Forces based at Minsk from 1960, with six years' break in the early 1980s, until 1992. The army was responsible for the air defense of Belarus and the Baltics from 1960 to the elimination of the army headquarters in 1980. When the army headquarters was reformed in 1986 it became responsible for the air defense of Belarus and western Ukraine. Its units were divided between the two countries when the Soviet Union dissolved.

== History ==
The 2nd Separate Air Defense Army traced its history back to the formation in November 1941 of the headquarters of the 5th Air Defense Division, which became the Kuybyshev Air Defense Divisional Region (raion PVO) in January 1942. The region headquarters was responsible for the formations providing air defense for the government institutions evacuated from Moscow and industry in the cities of Kuybyshev, Penza, Ulyanovsk, and Chapayevsk, the rail bridges over the Volga and Samarka, and airfields within the district boundaries. The district was reorganized as the 83rd Air Defense Division by 1 May 1944. The division headquarters moved forward to Minsk in July, where it took over different units, providing air defense for Minsk and adjacent rear and communications lines of the 1st, 2nd, and 3rd Belorussian Fronts. In September, the 83rd Air Defense Division was reorganized into the 14th Air Defense Corps. In January 1945 the corps became part of the Western Air Defense Front and until the end of the war provided air defense for Minsk and other important settlements in the Belorussian-Lithuanian Military District, its units covering rear objectives, crossings and communications in the zone of the 1st Belorussian Front. Major General Vladimir Martynyuk-Maksimchuk commanded the unit from August 1943 to November 1948.

After the end of the war, the corps headquarters was reorganized as the 19th Air Defense Division in 1946, then the 19th Anti-Aircraft Artillery Division, and in late 1948 was reorganized as the Minsk Air Defense Region of the 2nd category (equivalent to an army headquarters) of the National Air Defense Forces. The region included the 83rd Anti-Aircraft Artillery Division, formed in May 1949, responsible for the air defense of Minsk itself. In mid-1953, as a result of the expansion of the district boundaries to cover the entire Belorussian SSR, the Minsk Air Defense Region was renamed the Belorussian Air Defense Region. Just before this reorganization, on 1 May 1953, the Minsk Air Defense Region included the 144th Fighter Aviation Division PVO based in eastern Belorussia with 71 aircraft, the 83rd Anti-Aircraft Artillery Division, a separate anti-aircraft artillery battalion, and 28 radar stations. The anti-aircraft units totalled 304 heavy guns and 78 light guns, with the district including a total of 8,203 personnel.

In mid-1954 the Belorussian Air Defense Region was reorganized as the Minsk Air Defense Corps. From early- to mid-1960 the headquarters of the 2nd Separate Air Defense Army was formed in Minsk from that of the Minsk Air Defense Corps during the reorganization of the Soviet Air Defense Force from independent corps into air defense armies. The army included the 11th (Baranovichi) and 27th (Riga) Air Defense Corps, and the 3rd (Baltiysk) Air Defense Division. The 11th Air Defense Corps headquarters was formed from that of the 39th Fighter Aviation Division PVO. At the same time, from the end of the 1950s to the early 1960s, anti-aircraft gun units were replaced by surface-to-air missile units within the air defense system. The headquarters of the 3rd Air Defense Division was disbanded in 1972–1973 and its units, providing air defense for Kaliningrad Oblast, transferred to the 27th Air Defense Corps. The army was awarded the Order of the Red Banner on 15 January 1974 for its "merits demonstrated in the battles for the defense of the Soviet homeland and successes in combat training."

The army headquarters was eliminated during restructuring of the Soviet Air Defense Forces in 1980 that eliminated air defense army headquarters in the border districts. As a result, control of air defense units in the Belorussian and Baltic Military Districts fell under the Air Defense Directorate of the district, while fighter units transferred to the control of the district air force. In early 1986 the 2nd Separate Air Defense Army was restored in a reversal of the 1980 reorganization. The army changed its boundaries from the 1960 organization as it included the 11th Air Defense Corps and the 28th (Lvov) Air Defense Corps responsible for western Ukraine. The 27th Air Defense Corps was transferred to the 6th Separate Air Defense Army. At this time, the army began introducing new air defense systems, with the 15th Anti-Aircraft Missile Brigade of the 11th Air Defense Corps becoming one of the first PVO units to re-equip with the S-300PS missile system, going on alert duty in February 1986.

When the Soviet Union dissolved at the end of 1991, the army headquarters and the 11th Air Defense Corps came under control of Belarus, while the 28th Air Defense Corps came under control of Ukraine. The 16 March 1992 decree of the Supreme Council of Belarus that created the Armed Forces of Belarus reorganized the headquarters of the 2nd Separate Air Defense Army as the command of the Air Defense Forces of the Armed Forces of Belarus.

== 1986 structure ==
The structure of the army in 1986 was as follows:

- 11th Air Defense Corps, Baranovichi, Belorussian SSR
  - 61st Fighter Aviation Regiment, Baranovichi, 13 MiG-25PD, 25 MiG-23MLD
  - 201st Fighter Aviation Regiment, Machulishchy, 38 MiG-23MLD
  - 15th Anti-Aircraft Missile Brigade, Fanipol, two S-200V battalions and nine S-300PS battalions
  - 105th Anti-Aircraft Missile Brigade, Beryoza, four S-75 battalions and four S-125 battalions, reorganized as cadre 360th Anti-Aircraft Missile Regiment December 1989
  - 115th Anti-Aircraft Missile Brigade, Brest, two S-200V battalions, two S-75 battalions, six S-125 battalions
  - 127th Anti-Aircraft Missile Brigade, Lida, two S-200V battalions, four S-75 battalions, six S-125 battalions
  - 377th Guards Anti-Aircraft Missile Regiment, Polotsk, two S-200V battalions, two S-75 battalions, two S-125 battalions
  - 1146th Anti-Aircraft Missile Regiment, Orsha, six S-75 and S-125 battalions
  - 8th Radio-Technical Brigade, Baranovichi
  - 49th Radio-Technical Regiment, Uruchye
- 28th Air Defense Corps, Lvov, Ukrainian SSR
  - 179th Fighter Aviation Regiment, Stryi, 43 MiG-23MLD (rejoined corps 1988)
  - 894th Fighter Aviation Regiment, Ozernoye, 38 MiG-23MLD (rejoined corps May 1986)
  - 254th Anti-Aircraft Missile Regiment, Mukachevo, three S-75 battalions
  - 270th Anti-Aircraft Missile Regiment, Stryi, four S-75 battalions
  - 312th Anti-Aircraft Missile Regiment, Nadvornaya, S-75, disbanded 1987–1988
  - 438th Anti-Aircraft Missile Regiment, Kovel, three S-75 battalions
  - 521st Anti-Aircraft Missile Regiment, Borshchev, three S-200 battalions, three S-75 battalions
  - 540th Anti-Aircraft Missile Regiment, Kamenka Bugskaya, three S-200 battalions, three S-75 battalions (re-equipping with S-300PS)
  - 1st Radio-Technical Brigade, headquarters Lipniki near Lvov, six radio-technical battalions

== Commanders ==
The following officers commanded the army:

- Colonel General Sergey Sardarov (6 May 1960–12 February 1966)
- Colonel General Vladimir Lavrinenkov (February 1966–August 1969)
- Colonel General Yevgeny Yurasov (August 1969–1973)
- Colonel General Boris Bochkov (1973–1974)
- Lieutenant General Aleksandr Kuzmenko (1974–1978)
- Lieutenant General Georgy Skornyakov (1978–1980)
- Colonel General Vladimir Litvinov (1986–1987)
- Lieutenant General Vyacheslav Osmolovsky (1987–1992)
