= 147th Anti-Aircraft Missile Regiment =

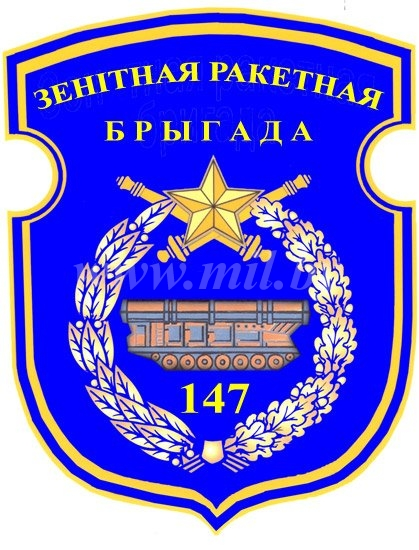
- Sleeve insignia of the 147th Anti-Aircraft Missile Brigade
- Active: 1949–present
- Country: Soviet Union (1949–1991); Belarus (1992–present)
- Branch: Soviet Army (1949–1991); Belarusian Air Defense Force (1992–2001); Belarusian Air and Air Defense Forces (2001–present)
- Type: Air defense
- Part of: Air and Air Defense Command
- Garrison/HQ: Babruysk
- Equipment: Osa-AKM

Commanders
- Current commander: Lieutenant Colonel Igor Kruglik

The 147th Anti-Aircraft Missile Regiment (147 zrp) (Russian: 147-й зенитный ракетный полк (147 зрп); Military Unit Number 96869) is a surface-to-air missile regiment of the Belarusian Air and Air Defense Forces. Stationed at Babruysk, the regiment is equipped with the Osa-AKM short-range, low altitude surface to air missile system to provide air defense for the local air base. Before being reduced to a regiment in 2017, it was the 147th Anti-Aircraft Missile Brigade.

== History ==
The history of the regiment began with the completion of the formation of the 110th Army Anti-Aircraft Artillery Brigade of the Soviet Army in Belorussian Military District on 1 April 1949, celebrated as the unit anniversary. The brigade was formed in five months from personnel of the 5th Guards Mechanized Army and officers of the Belorussian Military District, under the command of Colonel Ivan Dmitriyevich Zinoviev. It was based near the Babruysk fortress in the historical center of Babruysk, where it remains to this day. The unit was first equipped with medium caliber anti-aircraft guns and was the air defense brigade of the 5th Guards Mechanized Army, which became the 5th Guards Tank Army. It was reorganized as the 58th Anti-Aircraft Artillery Division on 11 November 1955. The unit received its battle flag on 11 April 1959 from the army commander, and on 1 August 1960 became the 160th Anti-Aircraft Artillery Regiment (Medium Caliber). Transitioning to the surface-to-air missile (SAM) era, the regiment received the S-75 Dvina system in 1962 and was accordingly redesignated the 160th Separate Anti-Aircraft Missile Regiment in 1963.

The regiment was declared an exemplary regiment in 1967 by the army commander for receiving high marks in the readiness check that fall, and regimental commander Colonel Suleyman Asadullayev was awarded the Order of the Red Banner. The 160th was reorganized as the 147th Anti-Aircraft Missile Brigade on 8 June 1972, transitioning to the Krug-M missile system. For distinguishing itself in combat training, the regiment was awarded the transferable Red Banner of the Belorussian Military District. The brigade was re-equipped with the S-300V SAM system between 1988 and 1990, the third Soviet unit to receive the new weaponry and the first to go on combat alert with it. By this point it was directly under district control as a frontal air defense brigade. The brigade participated in the Dvina, Vesna-75, Elektron-5, Berezina, Belarus, Zapad-81, Granit-82, and Boevoye sodruzhestvo-2000 (Combat Brotherhood) exercises.

After the collapse of the Soviet Union the brigade became part of the Belarusian Air Defense Force, which merged into the air force in 2001. The brigade became part of the Northwestern Operational Tactical Air Force Command on 31 January 2011. The brigade was rearmed with the Osa-AKM SAM system in 2016, and reorganized as the 147th Anti-Aircraft Missile Regiment on 1 December 2017. As of 2017 it was commanded by Colonel Aleksandr Galaktionov. The regiment frequently participates in tactical exercises to test its combat readiness held at the 174th Training Ground of the Air and Air Defense Forces. It is tasked with providing air defense for the Babruysk air base.

The regiment participated in the Zapad 2021 exercise under the command of Lieutenant Colonel Igor Kruglik, practicing target tracking with Russian aircraft at the 174th Training Ground. Just before the Russian invasion of Ukraine began, the brigade participated in the Soyuznaya reshimost (Allied Resolve) joint exercises with Russian troops in February 2022.
