= Kolomyia (air base) =

Military airfield located in Kolomyia, Ukraine

- IATA: none; ICAO: UKLO

Summary
- Operator: Ukrainian Air Force
- Coordinates: 48°31′43″N 25°07′35″E
- Interactive map of Kolomyia

Kolomyia ((ICAO: UKLO, FAA LID: ---)) was a military airfield located in Kolomyia, Ukraine. It housed a regiment of MiG-25s (48 GvORAP) and the 114th Tactical Aviation Brigade, equipped with MiG-29/UB aircraft, both part of the 14th Air Army.

Additionally, the base served as the home for the 668th Bomber Aviation Regiment between 1945 and May 1954.

In October 2007, plans were announced to commence civil use of the airport, with the construction of an air terminal complex.

== 48th Guard Nizhnednistrovsky Order of Suvorov Reconnaissance Aviation Regiment ==
The 48th Special Guard Nizhnednistrovsky Order of Suvorov Intelligence Aviation Regiment (48th GvORAP) was an aviation unit within the Air Forces of the Armed Forces of Ukraine that operated before 2004. It was stationed at the aerodrome in Kolomyia.

=== Part in the USSR Air Force ===
During the period from June 22, 1941, to July 14, 1941, and again from September 16, 1941, to February 8, 1943, they were part of the active army.

"On June 22, 1941, the 54th SS was stationed at Windaw airfield as part of the 6th Combined Air Aviation. Throughout the war, it functioned as the 40th high-speed bomber air regiment."

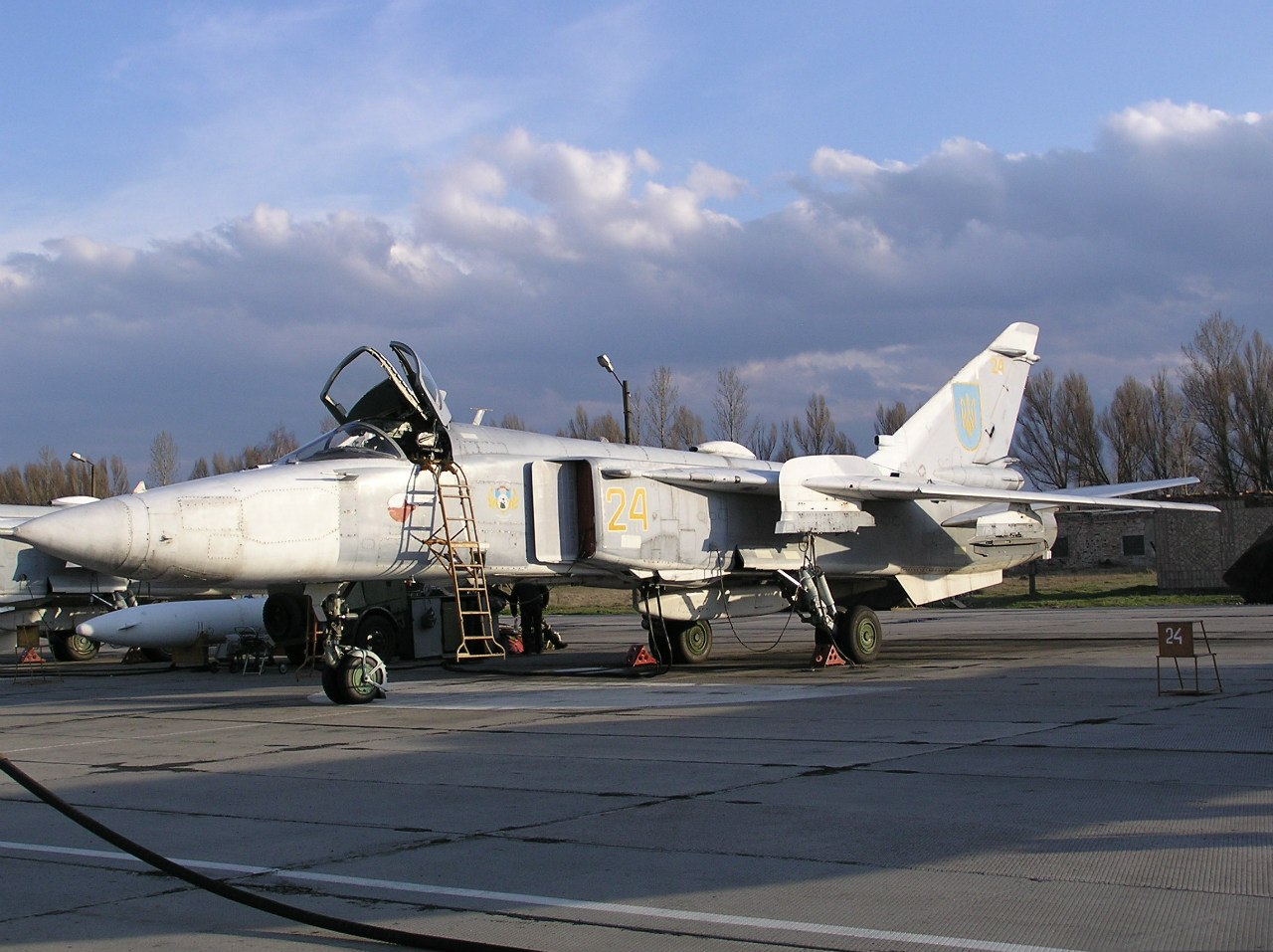
SU-24МP

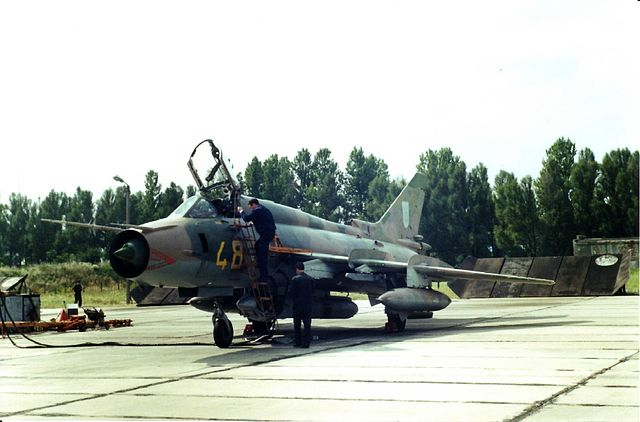
Su-17M4R 48th round

On June 22, 1941, the first combat flight took approximately 10 hours (excluding the reconnaissance aircraft's departure around 4 am in the Königsberg area), landing at Königsberg, Tauragė, and Memel. According to Soviet data, the raid was successful, with bombs precisely hitting targets and no losses incurred by the regiment. It marked the first Soviet bomber attack on military targets in the enemy's rear.

During the preparation of the Stalingrad offensive operation, the regiment participated in photographing the enemy troops' defensive positions, resulting in the creation of a comprehensive photo map of the entire district for senior military leadership.

As of December 20, 1942, the regiment possessed 10 Pe-2, 10 Pe-3, and 3 V-25s Mitchell aircraft.

As of January 1, 1943, the regiment possessed 11 Pe-3 aircraft, constituting 38% of its total combat fleet. Additionally, the regiment was equipped with A-20B "Boston" aircraft. Over time, the proportion of A-20B "Boston" aircraft in the regiment increased gradually while the number of Pe-3 aircraft decreased.

On February 8, 1943, it was reorganized into the 48th Guards Aviation Regiment of the Far Scouts under the Main Command of the Red Army.

In 1956, the regiment relocated to the Kolomyia airfield.

=== Commanders of the regiment in the period 1939-1992 ===
- Mogilevsky Ivan Evseevich 1939-1941
- Lavrentsov Ilarion Fedorovich 1941-1942
- Pavel Makarovich Sadov 1942-1944
- Lozenko Pavel Semenovich 1944-1946
- Artemyev Boris Petrovich 1946-1948
- Erkin Vasiliy Mikhailovich 1948-1953
- Romanov Alexander Ivanovich 1953-1956
- Delttsev Pavel Avdiyevich 1956-1957
- Chmakin Pavel Vasilyevich 1957-1962
- Matveev Gennady Pavlovich 1962-1966
- Zhigalkovich Nikolai Nikolayevich 1966-1972
- Theatrical Anatoly Petrovich 1972-1974
- Vedeneyev Valery Vasilievich 1974-1976
- Parshenin Yuri Ivanovich 1976-1979
- Lyashenko Viktor Yakovlevich 1979-1984
- Arbuzov Sergey Vasilievich 1984-1988
- Zinoviev Yuri Vasilievich 1988-1992

=== Heroes of the USSR ===
The title of Hero of the Soviet Union was bestowed upon troops of the regiment:

- Rogov Oleksiy Georgiyovych
- Morgunov Yuriy Vasilyevich
- Sergeev Vsevolod Pavlovich
- Chervyakov Volodymyr Ivanovich
- Tkachevsky Yuri Matveyevich

== Part of the Air Forces of Ukraine ==
As a part of the Armed Forces of Ukraine, the unit has consistently been one of the most capable units.

=== Commanders of the regiment during the period of independence ===
- Sinenko Yuri Mikhailovich - 1992-1993
- Baranov Anatoly Nikolayevich - 1993-2000
- Levchuk Igor Sergeevich - 2000-2001
- Gennady Vladimirovich Stromylo - 2002–2004.

== Arms ==
In the regiment's arsenal at various times, there were reconnaissance planes: IL-28, Yak-25, Yak-27R, Yak-28R, Mig-25, Su-24MR, and Su-17M4P.

The regiment was disbanded in 2004. The Su-24MR planes were transferred to the Starokonstantinov airfield, and the Su-17M4P to Zaporozhye.

== In the media ==
The scenes of the movie "Three Percent Risk" were filmed at the regiment's airfield. The main roles were portrayed by Soviet actors Kyrylo Lavrov and Alexander Sergeevich Demyanenko.
