= Commander of the Air and Air Defence Forces (Belarus) =

Administrative head in the Belarusian military

Commander of Air and Air Defence Forces
- Flag of the Air and Air Defence Forces
- Incumbent; Major General Andrei Lukyanovich since 13 December 2022
- Ministry of Defence
- Reports to: Chief of the General Staff
- Seat: Minsk
- Constituting instrument: Constitution of Belarus

The Commander of the Air and Air Defence Forces is the administrative head in the Belarusian Air Force, and is under the Chief of the General Staff and the Ministry of Defence. The current Commander of the Air and Air Defence Forces is Major General Andrei Lukyanovich.

== List of commanders ==
No.	Name	Rank	Term			Notes
No.	Name	Rank	Took office	Left office	Duration	Notes
1	Oleg Paferov	Lieutenant General	12 December 2001	16 November 2006	4 years, 11 months and 4 days	The first commander after unification of the Forces
2	Igor Azarenok	Major General	16 November 2006	11 January 2011	4 years, 1 month and 26 days	Dismissed for corruption
3	Sergey Lemeshevsky	Major General	6 May 2011	20 February 2012	9 months and 14 days	Dismissed for systematic non-fulfillment of the terms of his contract
4	Dmitry Pakhmelkin	Major General	20 February 2012	31 July 2012	5 months and 11 days	Dismissed after a Swedish amateur single-engine aircraft violated Belarusian airspace unopposed
5	Oleg Dvigalev	Major General	10 September 2012	18 July 2017	4 years, 10 months and 8 days	
6	Igor Golub	Major General	31 August 2017	18 November 2022	5 years, 2 months and 18 days	
7	Andrey Lukyanovich	Major General	13 December 2022	Incumbent	3 years, 8 months and 25 days	
