= Belarusian Air Force =

Aerial warfare branch of Belarus' armed forces

Air Force and Air Defence Forces of the Republic of Belarus
- Ваенна-паветраныя сілы і войскі супрацьпаветранай абароны Рэспублікі Беларусь (Belarusian); Военно-воздушные силы и войска противовоздушной обороны Республики Беларусь (Russian)
- The badge of the Belarusian Air Force
- Founded: 8 November 2001; 24 years ago
- Country: Belarus
- Type: Air force
- Role: Aerial warfare
- Part of: Armed Forces of Belarus
- Anniversaries: 16 August: Air Force Day

Commanders
- Commander-in-chief: President Alexander Lukashenko
- Minister of Defense: Lieutenant General Viktor Khrenin
- Commander of the Air and Air Defence Forces: Andrey Lukyanovich

Insignia
- Roundel

- Fin flash

- Flag

Aircraft flown
- Attack: Su-25
- Fighter: MiG-29, Su-30
- Helicopter: Mil Mi-8
- Attack helicopter: Mil Mi-24
- Trainer: L-39, Yak-130
- Transport: Il-76, An-26

The Air Force and Air Defence Forces of the Republic of Belarus (Note: Belarusian: Ваенна-паветраныя сілы і войскі супрацьпаветранай абароны Рэспублікі Беларусь, romanized: Vajenna-pavietranyja siły i vojski supraćpavietranaj abarony Respubliki Biełaruś; Russian: Военно-воздушные силы и войска противовоздушной обороны Республики Беларусь, romanized: Vojenno-vozdušnyje sily i vojska protivovozdušnoj oborony Respubliki Belarusj) is a branch of Armed Forces of Belarus tasked with conduction and countering air warfare. It was formed in 2001 by merging separate air force and air defense branches.

Belarus formed its air force in 1992 from the 26th Air Army of the Soviet Air Forces which had been serving in the Byelorussian SSR.

== History ==
=== Soviet era ===
On 5 May 1942, on the basis of the Air Forces of the Western Front, the 1st Air Army was created. In January 1949, the Army became the 26th Air Army. In 1980, the 26th Air Army was redesignated the Air Forces of the Belorussian Military District.

In May 1988 the Air Forces of the District were again renamed the 26th Air Army. In June 1992, the headquarters of the 26th Air Army became the headquarters of the Air Forces of the Republic of Belarus.

Aircraft operated by the 26th Air Army and 2nd Air Defence Army, prior to the collapse of the USSR, included the MiG-23, MiG-25, and the Sukhoi Su-22.

=== Independence and establishment ===
The Armed Forces of Belarus came into existence on September 20, 1991, when the Supreme Soviet of Belarus (Верховный Совет Белоруссии) voted an order "On the Formation of the Armed Forces of the Republic of Belarus" («О создании Вооружённых Сил Республики Беларусь») through the transformation of the Belorussian Military District of the Soviet Union. The order of the Supreme Soviet was followed by the Law "On the Armed Forces of the Republic of Belarus" («О Вооружённых Силах Республики Беларусь») a year later on November 3, 1992. In line with those transformations the 26th Air Army of the Belorussian MD became the Air Forces of Belarus and the Soviet Air Defence Troops' 2nd Air Defence Army became the Air Defence Troops of Belarus, continuing the Soviet practice of two separate air arms.

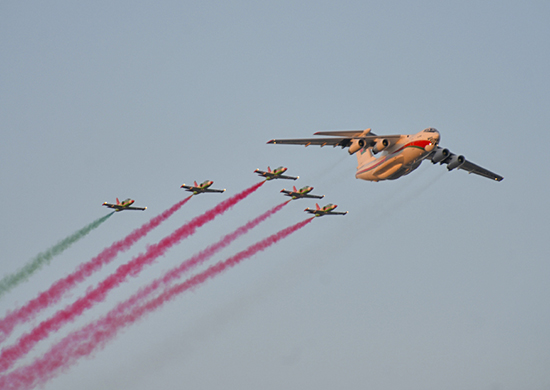
Belarusian jets during a flypast in Minsk, July 2019.

The Belarusian air force was established on June 15, 1992, when the Minister of Defence issued Order #05/15.06.1992 for the transformation of the 26th Air Army into the Air Forces of the Republic of Belarus (Russian: Военно-воздушные силы Республики Беларусь). The Belarusian Air Force took over all the assets of the 26th AA, except for the 1st Guards Bomber Aviation Division (1-я гвардейская бомбардировочная авиационная дивизия (1 гбад)), which was transferred to the Armed Forces of the Russian Federation. At that time the composition of the 26th Red Banner Air Army was:

- 1st Guards Stalingradskaya, awarded the Order of Lenin and twice awarded the Order of the Red Banner Bomber Aviation Division, Lida (with three air regiments: 116th Guards Bomber Air Regiment at Ross' Air Base flying Su-24M, 305th BAR at Postavy-Ozerki AB, flying Su-24 and 497th BAR at Lida AB, flying Su-24M)
- 927th Fighter Air Regiment (927-й иап) at Osovtsy-Beryoza AB, flying MiG-29 and MiG-21
- 10th Separate Reconnaissance Air Regiment (10-й орап) at Shtuchin AB, flying MiG-25RB/BM, Su-24MR and MiG-21R
- 151st Separate Air Regiment for Electronic Warfare (151-й оап РЭБ) also at Shtuchin AB, flying MiG-25RB and Yak-28PP
- 378th Separate Ground Attack Air Regiment (378-й ошап) also at Postavy-Ozerki AB, flying Su-25
- 397th Separate Ground Attack Air Regiment (397-й ошап) at Kobrin AB, flying Su-25
- 206th Separate Ground Attack Air Regiment (206-й ошап) at Pruzhany-West AB, flying Su-25 and L-39
- 50th Separate Mixed Air Regiment (50-й осап) at Lipki AB, flying Tu-134, An-12, An-26 and Il-22 aircraft, Mi-6, Mi-8 and Mi-24R helicopters. In May 1989 it absorbed the 66th Separate Mixed Air Squadron (66-я осаэ) and the 248th Separate Helicopter Squadron (248-я овэ), gaining their Mi-26, Mi-24К, Mi-8/MTYa/Mi-9.
- 266th Separate Helicopter Squadron for Electronic Warfare (266-я овэ РЭБ) at Minsk-Stepnyanka AB, flying Mi-8PPA/SMV
- 302nd Separate Helicopter Squadron for Electronic Warfare (302-я овэ РЭБ) also at Kobrin AB, flying Mi-8PPA/SMV

The Belarusian Air Forces also took over a large helicopter fleet from the Air Defence Troops, army aviation and the aviation of the RVSN:

From the Air Defence Troops:

- 25th Separate Mixed Squadron, 2nd Separate Army of the ADT (25-я осэ, 2-я ОА вПВО) at Machulishti AB, flying 10 Mi-8

From the army aviation:

- 65th Separate Heavy Combat Helicopter Regiment, Red Banner Belarusian Military District (65-й отбвп, кБВО) at Kobrin AB, flying 20 each of Mi-26, Mi-6 and Mi-8
- 181st Separate Combat Helicopter Regiment, 28th Combined Arms Army (181-й обвп, 28-я ОА) (Army HQ in Grodno) at Zasimovichi AB, flying 40 Mi-24V/P and 20 Mi-8MT/TV
- 95th Separate Tilzitskaya, Red Banner Mixed Helicopter Squadron, 28th Combined Arms Army (95-я Тильзитская, ордена Красной звезди освэ, 28-я ОА) (Army HQ in Grodno) at Chekhovshchizna-Grodno AB, flying a total of 20 Mi-24R/K, Mi-8/9 and Mi-2
- 276th Separate Combat Helicopter Regiment, 5th Guards Tank Army (276-й обвп, 5-я ГвТА) (Army HQ in Borisov) at Borovtsy AB, flying 40 Mi-24V/P and 20 Mi-8MT/TV
- 46th Separate Mixed Helicopter Squadron, 5th Guards Tank Army (46-я освэ, 5-я ГвТА) (Army HQ in Borisov) at Zaslonovo-Chashnik AB, flying a total of 20 Mi-24R/K, Mi-8/9 and Mi-2
- 13th Separate Mixed Helicopter Squadron, 7th Tank Army (13-я освэ, 7-я ТА) (Army HQ in Bobruysk) at Kiselevichi-Bobruysk AB, flying a total of 20 Mi-22VKP, Mi-6, Mi-9VzPU and Mi-8

From the RVSN aviation:

- 206th Separate Helicopter Squadron, 32nd Ballistic Missile Division, 50th Red Banner Ballistic Missile Army (206-я овэ, 32-я рд, 50-я кРА) at Postavy AB, flying 8 Mi-8T and 2 Mi-9VzPU
- 212th Separate Helicopter Squadron, 33rd Guards Ballistic Missile Division, 50th Red Banner Ballistic Missile Army (212-я овэ, 33-я гврд, 50-я кРА) at Mozyr' AB, flying 7 Mi-8T and 2 Mi-9VzPU
- 257th Separate Helicopter Squadron, 49th Guards Ballistic Missile Division, 43rd Ballistic Missile Army (257-я овэ, 49-я гврд, 43-я РА) at Lida AB, flying 7 Mi-8T and 2 Mi-9VzPU

After the break-up of the Soviet Union a memorandum was signed in Tashkent on May 15, 1992, between the successor states on the manner they will adhere to the Treaty on Conventional Armed Forces in Europe, commonly known as the Tashkent Accord (Соглашение о принципах и порядке выполнения Договора об обычных вооруженных в Европе (Ташкентское соглашение)). According to it Belarus was only allowed to field 80 combat helicopters (including the R/K recon variants of the Mi-24 and the armed air assault variants of the Mi-8, which the USSR did not consider actual combat helicopters). Many helicopters were sold overseas, took part in UN peacekeeping missions, were put into storage or utilised at the 1169th Aviation Storage Base (1169-я БХАТ) at Luninets.

In January 1992, the 927th Koenigsberg Red Banner Order of Alexander Nevsky Fighter Regiment at Bereza-Osovitsy, Brest Oblast (Military Unit Number 55782) (ru:927-й истребительный авиационный полк) became part of the Air Force of Belarus. In 1993 or 1994, it was renamed as the 927th Koenigsberg Red Banner Order of Alexander Nevsky Fighter Air Base.

On 8 November 2001, the Air Forces (VVS) and Air Defence Troops were merged into the Air Forces and Air Defence of the Armed Forces of Belarus.

In 2002 two Operational-Tactical Air Force Commands were formed parallel to the two territorial commands of the ground forces. The Western OTAFC had its HQ at the Baranovichi AB, Brest Oblast and was composed of one combat air base (Baranovichi), five missile air defence brigades, one radar brigade, four aviation command posts and other support units. The Southwestern OTAFC had its HQ at the Machulishchi AB in Minsk Oblast and was composed of one combat air base (Lida), three missile air defence brigades and one missile air defence regiment, one radar brigade, an aviation command post and other support units. The 50th Separate Transport Air Base, the reserve airfields and other support units were kept under Air Force HQ. In the end of 2014 the Chief of the Air Force and Air Defence Major-General Oleh Dvihalyov has informed the media, that the two OTAFCs were disbanded due to the increased automatisation in the command and control of the forces.

The new 56th Anti-Aircraft Missile Regiment was formed at Luninets air base in early 2023, equipped with the S-300PS. Previously, the 56th Anti-Aircraft Missile Brigade was based at Slutsk, equipped with the Buk missile system, but disbanded in late 2014.

=== Air Defence Forces ===
The armed forces of the Soviet Union kept the air defence assets responsible for the air cover of the territory separate from the Air Force. The 2nd Separate Air Defence Army (2-я отдельная армия ПВО) provided air defence for the Byelorussian SSR and had its HQ in the capital Minsk. It had two air defence corps - the 11th Corps of Air Defence (11-й корпус ПВО) had its HQ in Baranovichi an AOR covering Belarus and the 28th Corps of Air Defence (28-й корпус ПВО) had its HQ in Lviv, Ukrainian SSR and AOR over Western Ukraine. At the time of its takeover by the military of Belarus the 11th Corps AD had the following structure:

- 28th Separate Mixed Aviation Squadron, Minsk-Machulishchy, flying An-26, Mi-8 and Mi-9 (the army's liaison squadron)
- 11th Corps of Air Defence (11-й корпус ПВО), Baranovichi
  - 56th Signals Regiment, Urechye (city district within Minsk)
  - 10th Separate Battalion for Electronic Warfare
  - 61st Fighter Aviation Regiment AD, Baranovichi, 1st Sqn flying 13 MiG-25P/PDS, 2nd and 3rd Sqn flying 25 MiG-23 (being replaced by Su-27P from 1989 on and MiG-29 from 1992 on. Transformed into 61st Fighter Air Base in 1994, by the mid-90s it had 23 Su-27P and 30 MiG-29)
  - 201st Fighter Aviation Regiment AD, Machulishchy, flying 38 MiG-23
  - (28th Fighter Aviation Regiment AD, Krichev, flying MiG-25P, is listed by Sergey Drozdov in the April 2016 issue of Aviation and Spaceflight magazine as being part of the 2nd Separate Army of Air Defence (probably due to being based on Belarusian territory), but this is false. The air regiment belonged to the 2nd Corps AD of the Moscow Air Defence District)
  - 15th Missile Air Defence Brigade, Fanipol'
  - 115th Missile Air Defence Brigade, Brest
  - 127th Missile Air Defence Brigade, Lida (transformed into the 127th Missile Air Defence Regiment in 1995)
  - 147th Missile Air Defence Brigade, Bobruysk
  - 377th Guards Air Defence Missile Regiment, Polotsk
  - 1146th Guards Air Defence Missile Regiment, Orsha
  - 360th Missile Air Defence Regiment [cadred] (formerly the 105th Missile Air Defence Brigade, transformed into the cadred (skeleton manpower, mothballed equipment) 360th Missile Air Defence Regiment in December 1989), Beryoza
  - 8th Radiotechnical Brigade, Baranovichy
  - 49th Radiotechnical Regiment, Urechye

The command of the 2nd Separate Army AD and its 11th Corps AD was taken over by the Republic of Belarus and on August 1, 1992, it was amalgamated with the Air defence Troops of the Belarus Military District to form the Air Defence Troops of the Republic of Belarus.

== Shoot-downs during the Russo-Ukrainian war ==
In July 2024, a Russian Shahed drone flew into Belarusian airspace. The air force quickly scrambled Su-30 jets and Mi-24 armed helicopters to intercept it.

On July 12th 2025, the Belarusian Air Force scrambled a Mi-24 helicopter to intercept a Russian Gerbera drone.

In September 2025, the air force shot down unknown drones in its sky.

== Mission and functions ==
The VVS and Air Defence Forces were intended to protect population centres such as cities and regions, as well as the administrative, industrial, economic interests of the Republic. They are also intended to defend troops from the impacts of enemy air attacks, and also against the attacks of hostile troops, as well as fire support and the guarantee of combat operations of ground forces.

In peacetime, VVS and Air Defense forces are on standby to protect the state boundary in the air and also control of Belarusian airspace. The Air Force is responsible for all military aviation, as the Army maintains no aircraft of its own.

== Organization ==
Prior to August 2010, there were six primary airbases:

- Minsk - Machulishchy (50th Mixed Air Base)
- Lida (206th Assault Air Base)
- Baranovichi (61st Fighter Air Base) (Sukhoi Su-27),
- Ross (116th Bomber-Recon Air Base)
- Pruzhany (181st Combat Helicopter Base)
- Bereza (927th Fighter Air Base)

On 26 August 2010, a reorganisation of the Air Force & Air Defence Force was announced. It was reported that the 206th Assault Aviation Base (Lida) would be reorganized into the 116th Guards Red Banner Assault Base (at Ross) – formerly named the 116th Guards Bomber-Reconnaissance Base, flying Sukhoi Su-24 "Fencer" and Sukhoi Su-25 "Frogfoot" aircraft. The Su-24 bombers were retired. The 206th Assault Aviation Base was reorganised as the 206th Training Center.

The Mikoyan MiG-29 "Fulcrum" aircraft and personnel of the 927th Fighter Base (at Bereza) became part of the 61st Fighter Base at Baranovichi. Shortly after the move of MiG-29s to Baranovichi, on 23 September 2010, a MiG-29 crashed during a reported low-altitude flying exercise at the new location (see below). On 24 August 2010, the 927th Konigsberg Red Banner Order of Alexander Nevsky Fighter Air Base at Bereza was renamed the 927th Koenigsberg Red Banner Order of Alexander Nevsky Training Center and the use of unmanned aircraft systems.

The air force consists of more than 18,170 personnel, though this number is being reduced. There are now four active airbases:

- 61st Fighter Air Base (Baranovichi), flying the MiG-29. The Su-27 aircraft previously flown here were being retired in 2014.
- 116th Red Banner Guards Assault Air Base (Lida)
  - 206th Training Centre for Aircrew (L-39C; subordinate to 116 GvShAB)
- 50th Composite Air Base (Minsk - Machulishchy)
- 927th Red Banner Center for the Preparation and use of Unmanned Aerial Systems (Osovcy), Irkut-3, Irkut-10

The Belarusian Air Force maintains close links with the Russian Air Force and defense industry.

The Air Force and Air Defence has three arms and several support services:

- Air forces (военно-воздушные силы)
- Missile air defence troops (зенитные ракетные войска)
- Radiotechnical troops (радиотехнические войска)
- Special troops and services (специальные войска и службы)

=== Air Force and Air Defence Command ===
Air Force and Air Defence Command in Minsk

- 483rd Security, Support and Supply Base (483-я база охраны, обслуживания и обеспечения) in Minsk
- 56th Til'zitskiy Separate Signals Regiment (56-й Тильзитский отдельный полк связи) in Minsk
- 570th Air Traffic Control Center (570‑й центр организации воздушного движения) at Minsk Airport
- 61st Fighter Air Base (61-я истребительная авиабаза) at Baranovichi AB, flying Su-30SM and MiG-29
- 50th Mixed Air Base (50-я смешанная авиабаза) at Machulishchi AB, flying Il-76, An-26, Mi-24 and Mi-8
- 116th Guards Radomskaya Red Banner Ground Attack Air Base (116-я гвардейская Радомская Краснознамённая штурмовая авиационная база) at Lida AB, flying Su-25
  - 206th Pilot Training Center (206-й центр подготовки летного состава) at Lida, flying Yak-130 and L-39
- 927th Kyonigsbergskiy, awarded the Order of the Red Banner and the Order of Alexander Nevsky Center for Preparation and Operations of UAVs (927-й Кёнигсбергский Краснознамённый ордена Александра Невского центр подготовки и применения БПЛА) at Byaryoza, flying Irkut-3 and Irkut-10 UAVs
- 15th Missile Air Defence Brigade (15-я зенитная ракетная бригада) at Fanipol', armed with S-300PS
- 115th Missile Air Defence Brigade (115-я зенитно-ракетная бригада) at Brest, armed with S-300PS
- 147th Missile Air Defence Brigade (147‑я зенитно-ракетная бригада) at Bobruysk, armed with S-300V
- 120th Yaroslavskaya Missile Air Defence Brigade (120-я Ярославская зенитно-ракетная бригада) at Baranovichi, armed with Buk and Tor-M2
- 377th Missile Air Defence Brigade (377-й гвардейский зенитно-ракетный полк) at Polotsk, armed with S-200 and S-300
- 740th Missile Air Defence Brigade (740-я зенитно-ракетная бригада) at Borisov, armed with Osa-AKM
- 825th Missile Air Defence Regiment (825-й зенитно-ракетный полк) at Polotsk, armed with S-200
- 1146th Guards Missile Air Defence Regiment (1146-й гвардейский зенитно-ракетный полк) at Ostrovetskiy Rayon, armed with Tor-М2Ye
- 8th Radiotechnical Brigade (8-я радиотехническая бригада) at Baranovichi
- 49th Radiotechnical Brigade (8-я радиотехническая бригада) at Machulishchi
- 16th Separate Electronic Warfare Regiment (16‑й отдельный полк радиоэлектронной борьбы) at Byaryoza
- 276th Separate Airfield Security and Service Battalion (276‑й отдельный батальон охраны и обслуживания аэродрома) in Borovukha
- 83rd Separate Airfield Engineer Regiment (83-й отдельный инженерно-аэродромный полк) in Bobruysk
- 210th Aviation Fire Range (210-й авиационный полигон) in Ruzhany
- 174th Training Range (174‑й учебный полигон) in Domanovo, Ivatsevichskiy Rayon
- 223rd Center of Aviation Medicine (223-й центр авиационной медицины) at Machulishchi AB
- 3666th Aviation Technical Storage (3666‑й авиационно-технический склад) in Slutsk

== Incidents and accidents ==
On 30 August 2009, an Su-27 UBM aircraft crashed on the second day of the Air Show 2009 in Radom killing both pilots. On 21 April 2010, two MiG-29 aircraft were performing an exercise when they both collided. One managed to land safely, while the other crashed.

On 23 September 2010, a MiG-29 aircraft crashed. On 29 November 2011, a Mi-24 helicopter crashed in a small forest near the village of Novye Zasimovichi. The crew of three people was killed on impact. According to eyewitnesses, there was "A thick fog... the previous evening".

On 12 June 2012, a Sukhoi Su-25 aircraft crashed near a small village in Belarus. The pilot, Lieutenant Colonel Nikolai Gridnyov, lost control of the aircraft when maneuvering at low-altitude. He was ordered to eject, but instead remained on board to make sure the aircraft did not crash into the village. Gridnyov died in the crash.

On 11 November 2014, a MiG-29 aircraft crashed. On 23 February 2017, another MiG-29 aircraft crashed. The engine caught fire during takeoff, but the pilot ejected safely at Bobruisk, Mogilev Region. On 19 May 2021, a Yakovlev Yak-130 aircraft crashed in Baranavichy, causing minor damage to one house in the city. Two pilots ejected but died.

In 2022, a Belarusian Chekan loiterning munition was shot down over Ukraine. It is unknown whether it was operated by the air force.

=== Ryanair Flight 4978 ===
On 23 May 2021, a Belarusian MiG-29 was tasked with providing communication support and Minsk protection during an incident involving Ryanair Flight FR4978 (Athens—Vilnius). According to the ICAO fact-finding task force, it neither approached, engaged with, nor escorted the aircraft. (Note: A Telegram channel associated with Lukashenko stated that a MiG-29 was used to escort the aircraft on the orders of the President.) In Minsk, the Belarusian opposition activist and journalist Roman Protasevich was removed from the plane and arrested. Protasevich had previously fled Belarus and the Belarusian authorities added him to a wanted list in 2020 after he helped organize major protests against President Alexander Lukashenko. His partner was also arrested.

== Symbols ==
=== Emblem ===
The heraldic sign is the emblem of the Air Force, which was approved in April 2003. It is a stylized golden image of an arrow, lightning bolts and wings, combined with a wreath of golden oak and laurel branches, located in the center of a blue baroque shield, crowned with a five-pointed gold star. The shield is located against the background of a silver medal star.

=== Flag ===
The flag of the Air Force and Air Defense Forces was approved on January 19, 2005. The flag is a rectangular blue cloth, with the center consisting of four main and four additional directions of eight rays of golden color. In the center is the emblem of the Air Force. The flag has the same pattern on the front and back sides.

=== Belaya Rus ===
Belaya Rus is the aerobatic team of the Air Force and Air Defence Forces, performing aerobatics from combat training Aero L-39 Albatros. The team performs at aviation event and public holidays in Belarus.

== Aircraft ==
=== Current inventory ===
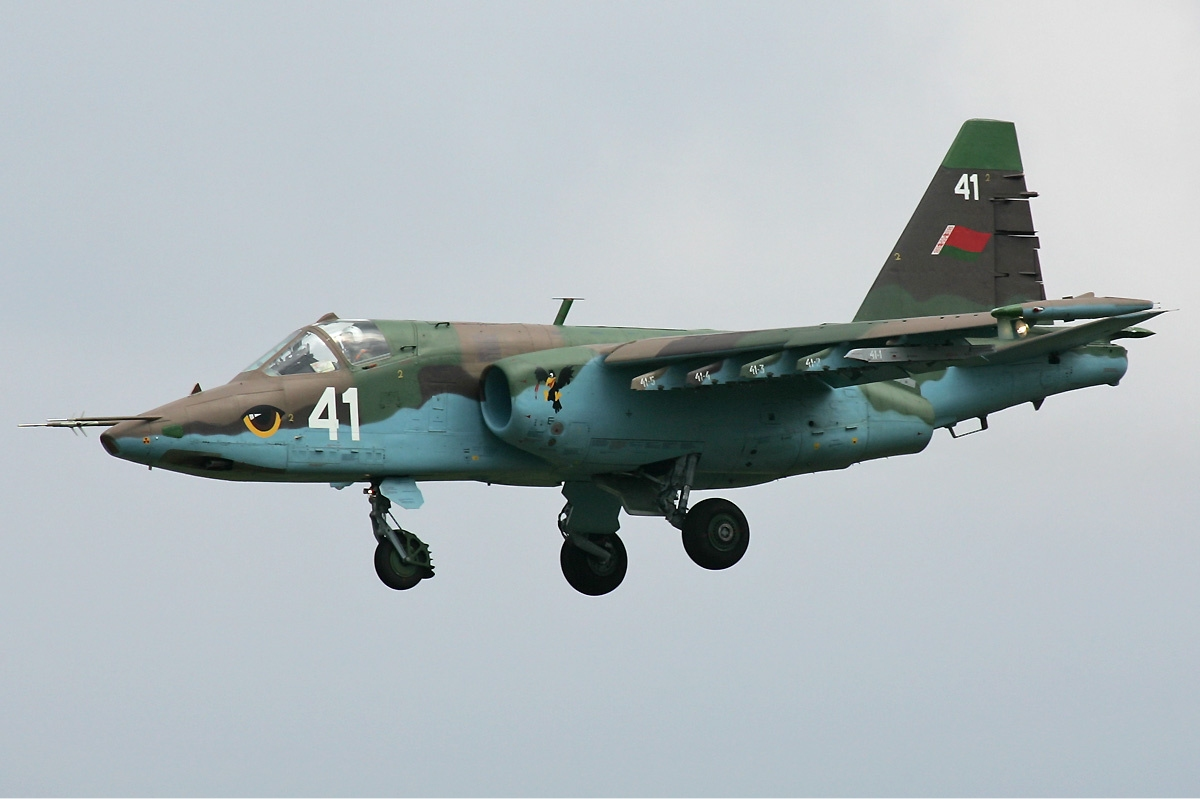
A Belarusian Su-25 in flight

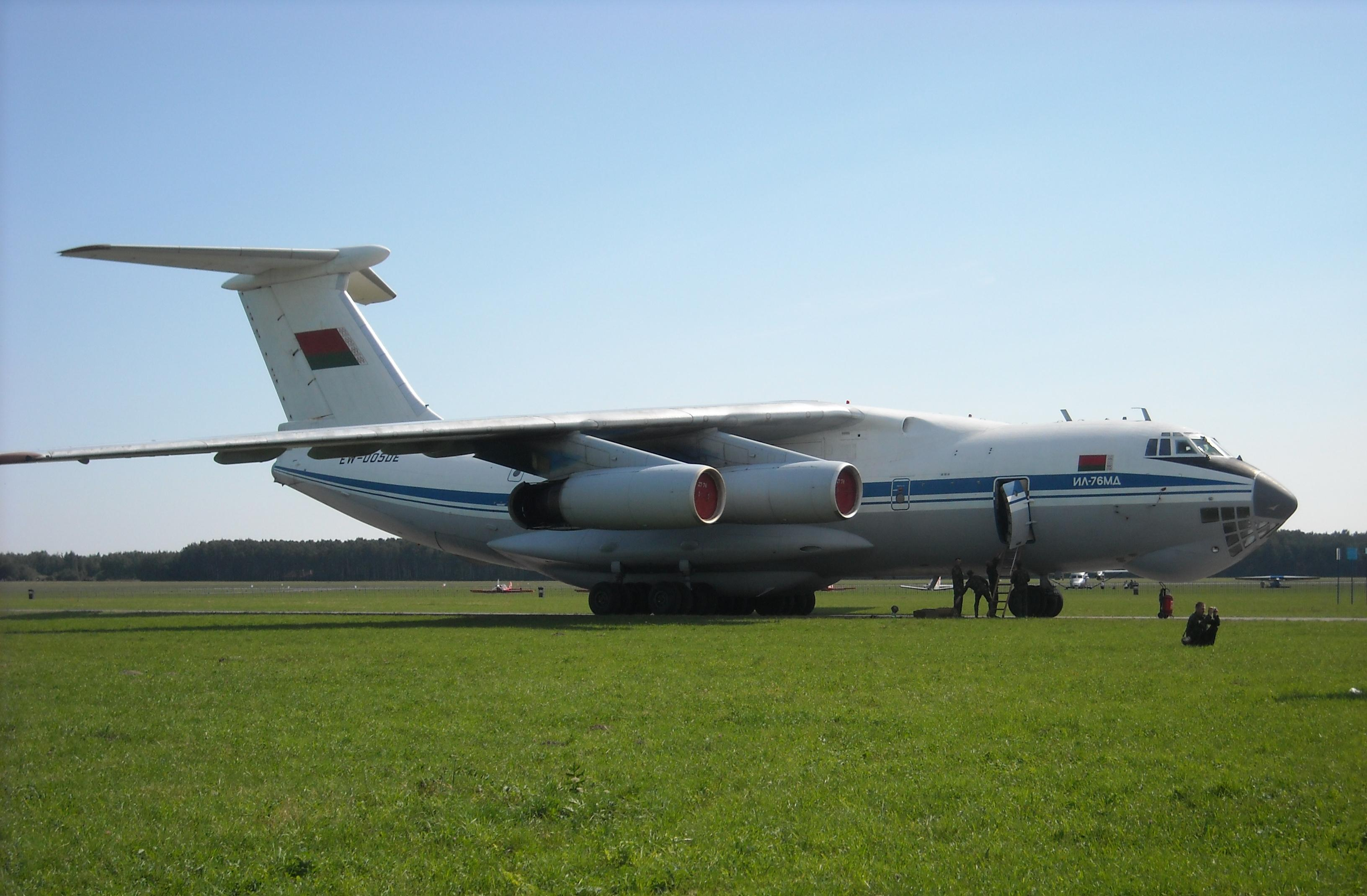
Ilyushin Il-76MD of the Belarusian Air Force on arrival day at Radom-Sadków AFB before Air Show 2009.

Aircraft	Origin	Type	Variant	In service	Notes
Combat aircraft
Mikoyan MiG-29	Soviet Union	Multirole	BM S/UB	32	13 upgraded to MiG-29BM in 2004
Sukhoi Su-30	Russia	Multirole	SM/SM2	16	8 SU-30SM and 8 upgraded SU-30SM2
Sukhoi Su-25	Soviet Union	Attack / CAS		50	
Transport
Ilyushin Il-76	Soviet Union	Strategic airlifter	MD	2	
Antonov An-26	Soviet Union	Transport		2	
Helicopters
Mil Mi-8	Soviet Union	Transport / Utility	Mi-8T MTV-5 17-V5	36	
Mil Mi-24	Russia / Soviet Union	Attack	Mi-24V Mi-24P	29	12 Mi-35s
Mil Mi-26	Soviet Union	Transport		3	
Trainer aircraft
Yak-130	Russia	Advanced trainer		11	
Aero L-39	Czechoslovakia	Jet trainer	C	10	
Sukhoi Su-27	Russia	Conversion trainer	UB	1	
Sukhoi Su-25	Soviet Union	Conversion trainer		5	

=== Retired aircraft ===
Previous aircraft operated prior to the collapse of the USSR were the An-12BP, An-24B, MiG-21bis, MiG-23MLD, MiG-25PDS, MiG-27K, Su-17M4, Sukhoi Su-24M, Su-27P, Tu-16A, Tu-22M3, Yak-28PP, Yak-52, Mil Mi-6 and Mil Mi-2.

== See also ==
- 558th Aircraft Repair Factory, major repair establishment in Belarus
- ru:Категория:Предприятия авиационной промышленности СССР - Russian category on aviation repair plants in the USSR
