= Ivan Zhuravlyov =

Russian politician (1927–2026)

- Иван Журавлёв

Minister of Industry, Transport and Communications of the Republic of Mari El
- In office 1999–2001

Personal details
- Born: 28 October 1927 Kostiantynivka, Mykolaiv Oblast, Ukrainian SSR, USSR
- Died: 16 November 2026 (aged 99) Yoshkar-Ola, Mari El, Russia
- Party: CPSU
- Education: Kabardino-Balkarian State University
- Profession: Politician, engineer

Ivan Nikiforovich Zhuravlyov (Russian: Иван Никифорович Журавлёв; 28 October 1927 – 16 November 2026) was an Ukrainian-born Russian engineer and politician who served as a minister of industry, transport and communications of the Republic of Mari El from 1999 to 2001. He also was a member of the Supreme Soviet of the Mari ASSR from 1980 to 1990.

Zhuravlyov died in Yoshkar-Ola on 16 November 2026, at the age of 99.
