= Chortkiv Air Base =

Former air base in Chortkiv, Ternopil Oblast, Ukraine

Chortkiv Air Base (Chortkov Air Base)
- Chortkiv, Chortkiv Raion, Ternopil Oblast in Ukraine

Site information
- Type: Air Base
- Owner: Ministry of Defence
- Operator: Ukrainian Air Force

Location
- Shown within Ternopil Oblast Chortkiv Air Base (Ukraine)
- Coordinates: 48°58′35″N 25°44′39″E

Site history
- In use: Unknown-2005

Airfield information
- Elevation: 10 metres (33 ft) AMSL
Runways
Direction	Length and surface
17/35	Concrete

Chortkiv Air Base is a former Ukrainian Air Force installation located in Chortkiv, Chortkiv Raion, Ternopil Oblast, Ukraine.

In December 1954 the 236th Fighter-Bomber Aviation Regiment (APIB) arrived, and was present until August 1984. Formed part of 289th Fighter-Bomber Aviation Division (ADIB) of the 14th Air Army of the Carpathian Military District. The unit flew the Mikoyan-Gurevich MiG-15 (NATO: Fagot), Mikoyan-Gurevich MiG-17 (NATO: Fresco), Mikoyan-Gurevich MiG-21 (NATO: Fishbed), Mikoyan-Gurevich MiG-23BM (NATO: Flogger) & Mikoyan MiG-27K (NATO: Flogger-J2)

In October 1983 the 229th independent Aviation Squadron for Electronic Warfare (established as a reconnaissance squadron in 1958) was upgraded into the 118th independent Aviation Regiment for Electronic Warfare.

In 1989 the 452nd Independent Assault Aviation Regiment) (452 OShAP) arrived flying the Sukhoi Su-25. It became a brigade after Ukrainian independence. It was operational until 2004.

With the disbandment of the 118th OAP REB, the Su-24MP aircraft were transferred to Kolomyia to the 48th Separate Guards Reconnaissance Aviation Regiment), where they stayed for four years, and in 1998 they were sent to Mykolaiv to the 33rd TsBP (combat training center).
