= Lida (air base) =

Military air base in Lida, Belarus

Lida
- Lida, Grodno Region in Belarus
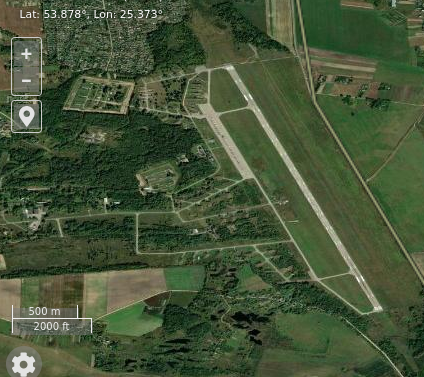
- Satellite imagery of Lida air base

Site information
- Owner: Ministry of Defence of the Republic of Belarus
- Operator: Air Force and Air Defence Forces of the Republic of Belarus

Location
- Shown within Belarus
- Coordinates: 53°52′40″N 25°22′23″E

Site history
- In use: Unknown - present
- Battles/wars: 2022 Russian invasion of Ukraine

Airfield information
- Identifiers: ICAO: UMDD
- Elevation: 183 metres (600 ft) AMSL
Runways
Direction	Length and surface
15/33	2,470 metres (8,104 ft) Concrete

Lida is an air base of the Air Force and Air Defence Forces of the Republic of Belarus located in Lida, Grodno Region, Belarus.

It is home to the 116th Guards Assault Aviation Base, flying Sukhoi Su-25s and Yak-130s alongside the 206th Training Center for Aircrew with Aero L-39C Albatroses.

The 277th Bomber Aviation Regiment of the Russian Air Force with Sukhoi Su-24's from Komsomolsk-on-Amur Airport deployed here as part of the 2022 Russian invasion of Ukraine.
