= Operation Curtain =

1984–88 operation of the Soviet–Afghan War

- Part of Soviet–Afghan War
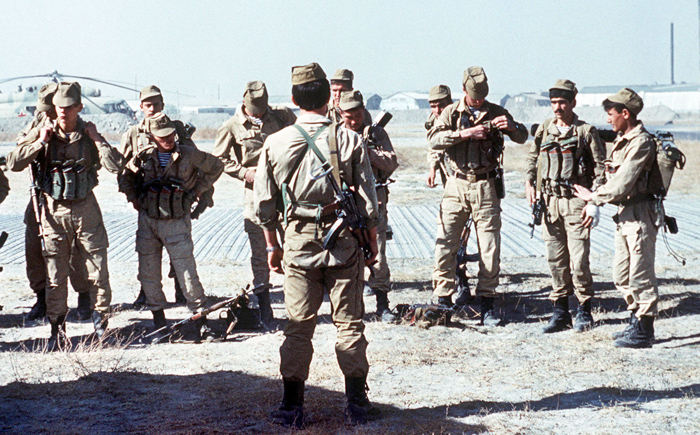
- Special Forces soldiers are preparing for a helicopter flight in a search group.
Date	March 1984 – April 1988
Location	15 border provinces, Afghanistan
Result	Tactical Soviet and Afghan government Success; 12–15% of supply caravans intercepted; Heavy losses for the Mujahideen

Belligerents
Afghanistan; Soviet Union	Afghan Mujahideen; Pakistan; Iran

Commanders and leaders
(Afghanistan) Mohammad Najibullah; (Afghanistan) Shahnawaz Tanai; (Afghanistan) Mohammed Rafie	Ismail Khan; (Pakistan) Zia-ul-Haq; Armed by: (Iran) Ruhollah Khomeini

Units involved
40th Army (OKSVA) Afghan Army: 9th Infantry Division; 55th Motorized Infantry Brigade	Mujahideen; Pakistan: ISI; Iran Unknown

Strength
11,000 intelligence and special forces personnel	Tens of thousands of local and foreign fighters

Casualties and losses
Special forces only: 570 killed; 11 missing	17,000+ killed

Operation Curtain (also referred to as Caravan war) was a set of raids and ambushes conducted by Soviet spetsnaz troops to block the Pakistani-Afghan and Iranian-Afghani border during the Soviet–Afghan War.

== Background ==
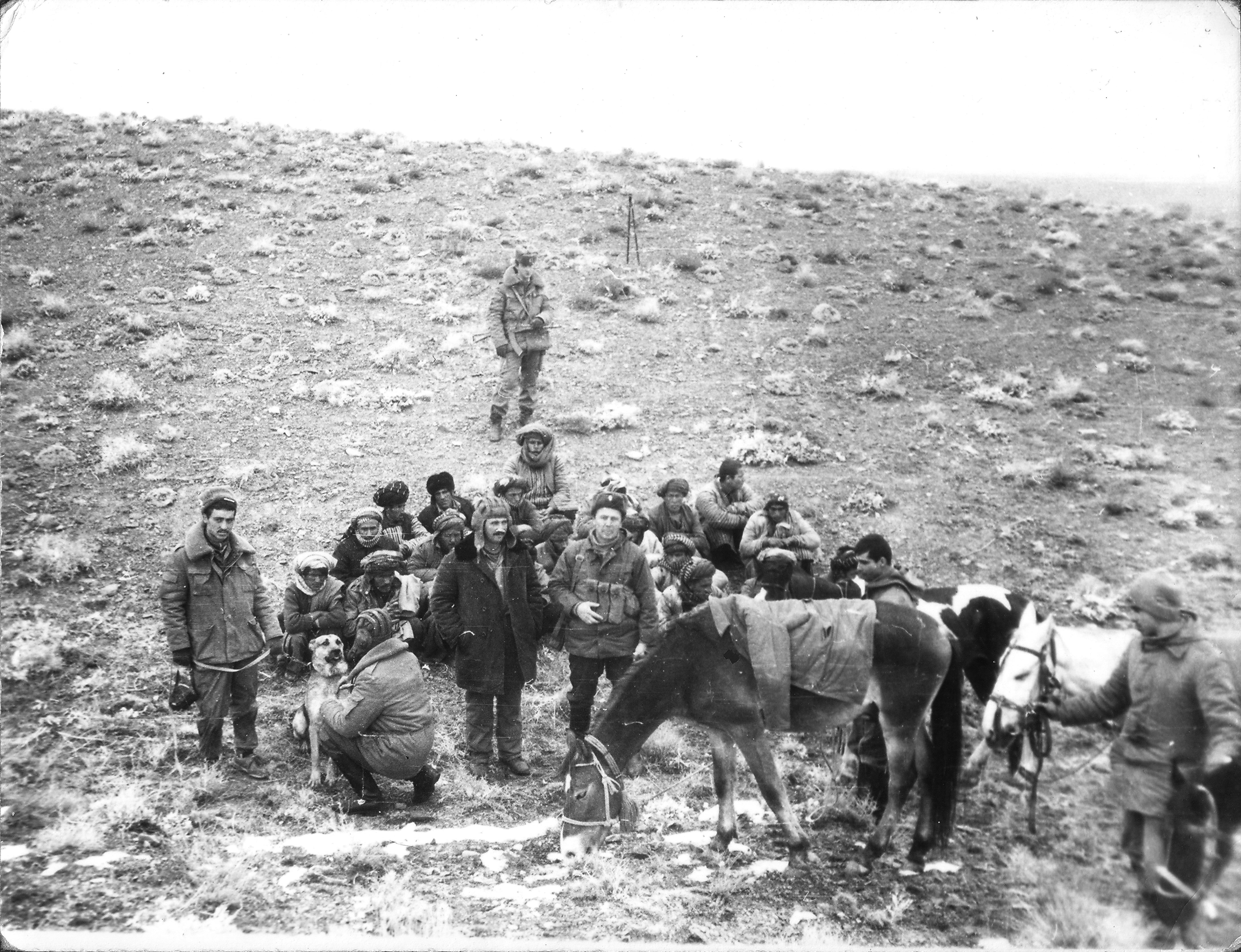
Afghan caravan detained for identification by OKSVA forces (1986).

By the beginning of 1984, the USSR Armed Forces leadership was aware of the urgent need to block the caravan routes along which arms, ammunition, food and manpower were being transferred from Pakistan to the armed opposition units.

Until 1984, a small number of Soviet troops stationed in the eastern and southeastern provinces were engaged in constant raids in places of concentration of the enemy and the elimination of enemy weapons depots, which included:

- 56th Guards Air Assault Brigade – provinces of Paktia province and Logar province.
- 66th Motorized Rifle Brigade – provinces of Nangarhar province and Kunar Province.
- 70th Guards Motorized Rifle Brigade – provinces of Kandahar province and Helmand province.
- 191st Motorized Rifle Regiment – Ghazni province.
- 860th Motorized Rifle Regiment – Badakhshan province. Blocked the exit from Wakhan Corridor.

These formations were deployed at a relatively small distance from the border with their units dispersed along the main roads, slightly hampered the enemy's ability to transport goods.

The presence of a sufficient number of formations was required, which were to engage in the search and destruction of caravans. Soviet troops needed a transition from passive guarding of the main roads to active search and destroy operations along all possible routes.

In February 1984, the leadership of the Soviet Armed Forces made a decision to adopt a plan to create the "Curtain" border zone, the main task of which would be to block most of the caravan routes along which the Mujahideen were supplied from Pakistan. Later it was decided to expand the sphere of control in the western direction, to eliminate the supply of the enemy from Iran. This operation in the memoirs of many military men and in the works of military historians is often referred to as the 'Caravan war'. The operational group at the command post of the 40th Army, for the coordination and organization of the fight against caravans, received the same name "The Curtain"

The beginning of the plan was the redeployment in March 1984 to the eastern provinces of two spetsnaz formations formed in 1980, which had been part of the OKSVA since October 1981.
These detachments (combined battalions) were:

- 154th Spetsnaz Detachment – formed on the basis of 15th Spetsnaz Brigade in the city of Chirchik, Uzbek SSR. Relocated from Samangan to Jalalabad, Nangarhar province.
- 177th Spetsnaz Detachment – formed on the basis of the 22nd Spetsnaz Brigade in the city of Kapchagai, Kazakh SSR. Relocated from Gulbahor to Ghazni, Ghazni Province.

Separately from USSR, the 173rd Spetsnaz Detachment (military unit 96044) was deployed. It was formed on February 29, 1980 on the basis of 12th Spetsnaz Brigade, in Lagodekhi Georgian SSR, as part of the Transcaucasian Military District. This unit was originally formed in the likeness of Muslim battalions, and was to be deployed in Afghanistan in 1980. However, it was introduced only on February 10, 1984. By February 14, the 173rd detachment arrived at the place of permanent deployment in the city of Kandahar of the southern province of the same name.

The interception of caravans was carried out in two ways:

- In the daytime – insertion of recon teams by helicopters, which checked the caravans for weapons and ammunition.
- In the nighttime – the organization of ambushes on caravan trails.

Separately from the 154th, 173rd and 177th detachments, the 459th separate special-purpose company (or military unit 44633) operated, formed on the basis of the 15th brigade, which was stationed in Kabul from February 1980 year.

To install signal telemetry equipment, which helped to identify the advancement of caravans on remote mountain routes, the 897th Reconnaissance Company was attached from the 40th army with special equipment (military unit 41377). Artillery or aircraft raided the targets designated by forward observers, after which the area was examined by a damage assessment group sent by helicopters.

=== Reforming military intelligence ===
On November 11, 1984, a directive was issued in which the reconnaissance units of the 40th Army were reformed. Reconnaissance platoons were created in each motorized rifle, paratrooper, airborne assault and tank battalion of the 40th Army. As a result, the number of reconnaissance platoons in the 40th Army reached 146 units (including regimental reconnaissance companies and separate reconnaissance battalions of divisions).

In total, by December 1984, 11 motorized rifle battalions were involved in the implementation of Operation "Curtain". In the end the task of setting up ambushes fell on 3 reconnaissance battalions (650th, 781st and 783rd), 4 spetsnaz detachments (in September 1984, the 668th detachment will be added), 1 spetsnaz company, 20 reconnaissance companies from brigades and regiments and 73 reconnaissance platoons from line battalions, that is, 33 settlement battalions. These units could set up 180 ambushes at once. Taking into account the rotation, rest and training of units, as well as the capabilities of 34th Aviation Corps under the 40th army, no more than 30-40 ambushes were set up every day.

=== Expansion of special forces ===
By the middle of 1984, it became clear that 3 detachments and 1 special forces company are not enough to radically change the situation on the ground. More special forces were required. In addition to caravans coming from Pakistan, control over the border areas with Iran was required.

In June 1984, a decision was made to create an additional 5 more spetsnaz detachments. These included:

- 186th Spetsnaz detachment – formed on February 15, 1985 on the basis of 8th Spetsnaz Brigade, in Izyaslav, Ukrainian SSR, part of Carpathian Military District. Relocated on April 30, 1985 to Shahjoy, Zabul province.
- 334th Spetsnaz detachment – formed on January 13, 1985 on the basis of 5th Spetsnaz Brigade, in Maryina Gorka, Byelorussian SSR, part of the Byelorussian Military District. Relocated on March 14, 1985 to the city of Asadabad District, Kunar province.
- 370th Spetsnaz detachment – formed on January 13, 1985 on the basis of 16th Spetsnaz Brigade, in Chuchkovo, Russian SSR, part of Moscow Military District. Relocated on March 21, 1985 to Lashkargah, Helmand province.
- 411th Spetsnaz detachment – was formed latter directly on the territory of Afghanistan in the period from November 19 to December 17, 1985, in the city of Shindand from elements of the 22nd Spetsnaz Brigade and 5th Guards Motor Rifle Division. Relocated on 25 December 1985 to Farahrud, Farah province.
- 668th Spetsnaz detachment – formed on August 21, 1984 on the basis of 9th Spetsnaz Brigade, in Kirovograd, Ukrainian SSR, part of the Kiev Military District. Relocated in September 1984 to Bagram, Parwan Province. By March 4, 1985, the detachment was redeployed to Souffla near Baraki, Logar province.

To coordinate the detachments, 15th and 22nd special-purpose brigades Headquarters from Turkestan Military District were relocated to Afghanistan. Newly formed logistics units and a special communications detachments were attached to each brigade. Staffing of brigades was almost 2,500 people. On May 15, 1988 (at the beginning of the withdrawal of troops), the personnel of the 15th brigade numbered 2,482 people. Of these, 302 officers and 147 warrant officers.

=== Aviation support ===
Both brigades received air support from the 40th Army air assets in the form of attached helicopter regiments and helicopter squadrons, which carried out the transfer of special forces and their fire support.

- 15th Brigade was assigned the 239th Helicopter Squadron – Mi-24 (16 units) Mi-8 (16 units) with a deployment in Ghazni.
- 22nd Brigade was assigned the 205th Helicopter Squadron – Mi-24 (16 units) Mi-8 (16 units) with a deployment in Lashkargah.
- 459th Company was assigned a helicopter squadron from the 50th Aviation Regiment, stationed in Kabul.

In addition, 15th and 22nd brigades were supported by:

- 280th Helicopter Regiment – Mi-6 (12 units) Mi-24 (22 units) Mi-8 (23 units), subordinated to 70th Motor Rifle Brigade.
- 292nd Helicopter Regiment – Mi-6 Mi-24 Mi-8, subordinated to 66th Motor Rifle Brigade.
- 335th Helicopter Regiment – Mi-24 (24 units) Mi-8 (24 units), subordinated to 56th Guards Air Assault Brigade.

== Effectiveness ==
According to the estimates of the leadership of the 40th Army, in the period from March 1984 to May 1988, the result of the activities of the military personnel of special forces was:

- killing of 17,000 mujahideen with a further 825 prisoners captured.
- capture and destruction of 990 caravans with weapons and ammunition.
- detection and destruction of 332 warehouses with weapons and ammunition.

According to military experts, the operation had limited success as it was only possible to intercept 12–15% of the total number of caravans. This came at a cost of 581 servicemen killed and missing during the operation from March 1984 to the end of April 1988:

- 15th Brigade – 355 killed and 10 missing.
- 22nd Brigade – 199 Killed and 1 missing.
- 459th Company – 16 killed.

Despite causing seemingly heavy casualties to the mujahideen, the conduct and professionalism of the GRU special purpose units was called into question by veterans of other elite Red Army formations. Among the officers of the Soviet Airborne Forces, not only was the training of special forces servicemen considered low, but also the quality of intelligence supplied to them by their sources, which was confirmed by the special forces officers themselves.

== See also ==
- Spetsnaz
- Soviet Airborne Troops
