= The Truth About 9th Company =

2008 video game

- Developers: Extreme Developers and Kranx Productions
- Publisher: 1C (in Russia)
- Platform: Windows
- Release: RUS: February 15, 2008
- Genres: First-person shooter, documentary
- Mode: Single player

The Truth About 9th Company, officially launched on 18 February 2008 (Russian: Правда о девятой роте) is the first Russian documentary computer game. The game simulates the historical battle for Hill 3234 which took place on 7–8 January 1988 in southern Afghanistan between Soviet paratroop units of the 345th Independent Guards Airborne Regiment and mujahideen.

== Plot ==
The game storyline is divided into seven episodes that illustrate the key points of the battle for Hill 3234. In each episode the player is set the same combat mission that was completed by the real defenders of the hill. Episodes follow one after another according to the progress of events which took place on the battle field.

== Development ==
Dmitry Puchkov, the ideological leader and inspirer of development, and Andrei Kuzmin, the leader of KranX Productions game development studio, researched the details of Operation Magistral and the real circumstances of the Battle for Hill 3234.

The main takeaway of The 9th Company movie - "they were all swindled" - made the painful impression on me, and Dmitry's story about how everything happened, raised sudden desire to intelligibly tell as many people as possible how it was actually in that story.

Dmitry Puchkov announced the idea of the game as a response to "the intentional destruction of historical memory of the people".

As a result, the in-game mountainous terrain was reconstructed based on satellite imagery, and the progress of events was refined with the help of surviving eyewitnesses.

== Reception ==
The Truth About 9th Company received a mixed reaction from the video game review web sites.

PlayGround.ru game review web site rated The Truth About 9th Company 8.0 out of 10.0, with reviewer demigot saying:

All this is relevant only if you are inspired with the atmosphere of the game, if all that the authors had recreated, will affect some chords of people's soul. Otherwise, "The Truth About 9th Company" may seem only as not very attractive virtual shooting range with straightforward artificial intelligence and monotonous gameplay. Although it really is a unique simulator of the feat.

On 22 February 2008, the presentation of The Truth About 9th Company to the participants of the Round Table "Computer games as a new factor in education" within XII World Russian People Council took place in Moscow. The Round Table Director Roman Silantiev noted that the computer games like The Truth About 9th Company "do not only raise patriotism in young people, but also provide objective knowledge of military affairs, history and geography". He emphasized that combat operations are reproduced within the game exactly, while it's possible to play only for the one side according to the game rules.
