= Avangard, Ryazan Oblast =

Avangard Авангард
- Village
- Location within Ryazan Oblast Location within Russia
- Coordinates: 54°16′N 41°34′E
- Country: Russia
- Region: Ryazan Oblast
- District: Chuchkovsky District
- Time zone: UTC+3:00

Avangard (Russian: Авангард) is a rural locality (a village) in Unkosovskoye Rural Settlement of Chuchkovsky District, Ryazan Oblast, Russia. The population was 370 as of 2018. There are 8 streets.

== History ==
The village of the Central Branch of the Unkosovo State Farm was renamed to Vanguard by a decree of the Presidium of the Armed Forces of the RSFSR In 1966.

== Geography ==
Avangard is located 12 km east of Chuchkovo (the district's administrative centre) by road. Unkosovo is the nearest rural locality.
