= 152nd Independent Air Assault Battalion =

Airborne Forces of Turkmenistan
- Türkmenistanyň Howa Desant Goşunlary
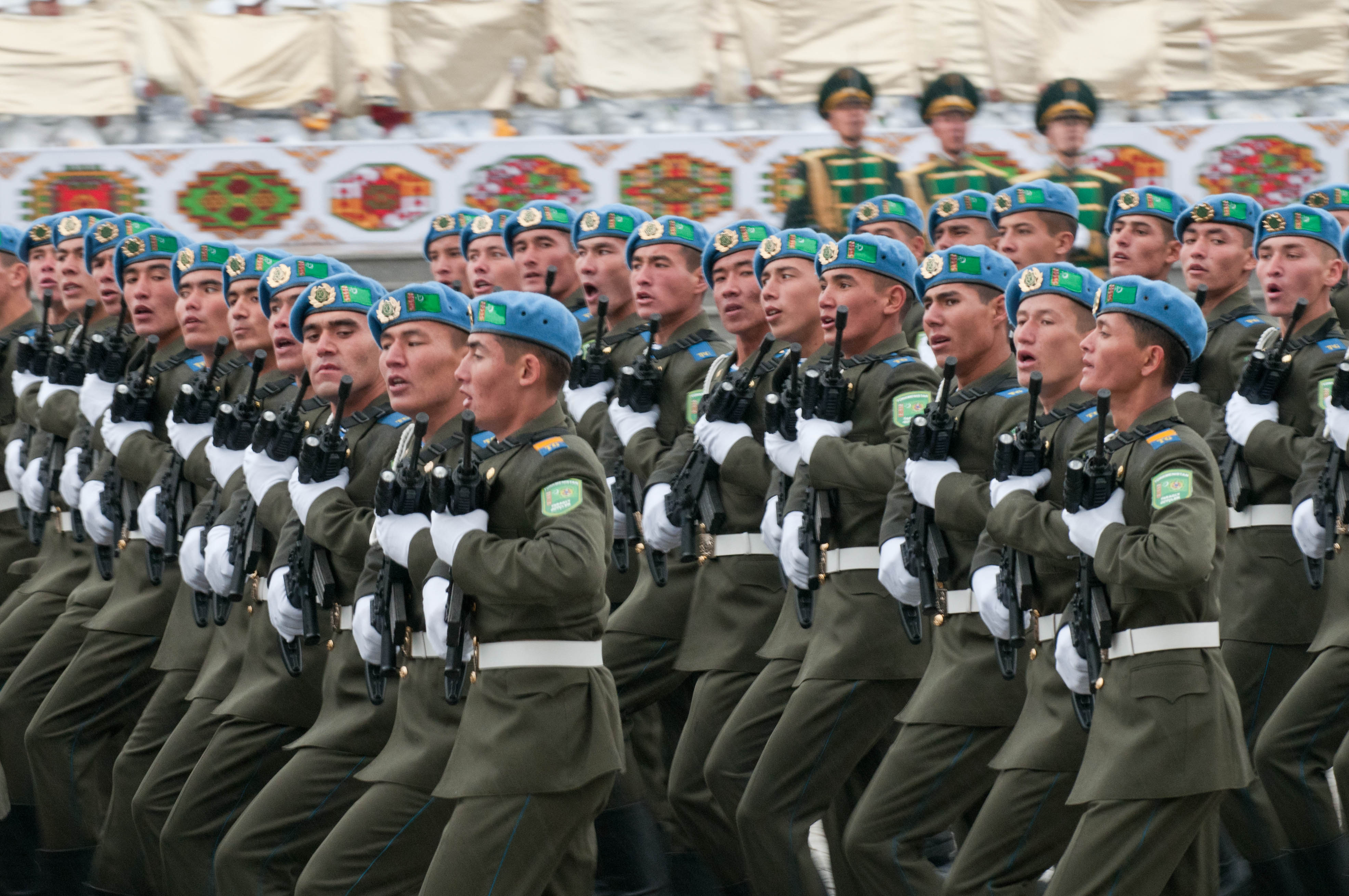
- Active: 1994; 31 years ago
- Country: Turkmenistan
- Branch: Turkmen Ground Forces
- Type: Air assault
- Part of: (Turkmenistan) Ministry of Defense
- Garrison/HQ: Mary

Commanders
- Current commander: Captain Serdar Bayriyev
- Notable commanders: Major Serdar Tuvaev

Insignia
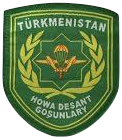
- Patch

The 152nd Independent Air Assault Battalion, known simply as the Airborne Forces of Turkmenistan (Turkmen: Türkmenistanyň Howa Desant Goşunlary) is the official paratrooper unit of the Armed Forces of Turkmenistan.

== History ==
The unit descends from the 56th Guards Air Assault Brigade of the Soviet Airborne. The brigade itself descends from the 105th Guards Vienna Airborne Division. After returning from service in Afghanistan during Operation Magistral, the brigade crossed the border in June 1988 into the Turkmen Soviet Socialist Republic, during the Soviet withdrawal from Afghanistan, being based out of Ýolöten. After the dissolution of the Soviet Union in 1991, the brigade was withdrawn to the Russian Federation. Despite this, its 4th battalion remained in Ýolöten. This battalion was included in the structure of the formed Turkmen Ground Forces. On 15 December 1994, the 4th Battalion, 5th DSB was dissolved and renamed given its current name. The 152nd Independent Air Assault Battalion was stationed in the city of Ýolöten until the spring of 2003 when it was redeployed. The battalion is currently (as of 2005) based at the 99th Mary-2 Air Base. In April 2010, personnel from the battalion took part in the Galkan-2010 exercises. In 2016, Senior Lieutenant Jahan Yazmuhammedova became the first female paratrooper in the Armed Forces when she joined the unit.

== See also ==
- Russian Airborne Forces
- 7th Airborne Assault Brigade
- 36th Air Assault Brigade (Kazakhstan)
- Scorpion 25th Special Forces Brigade
