= 15th Independent Special Forces Brigade =

Elite Uzbek Ground Forces unit

- 15-я отдельная бригада специального назначения
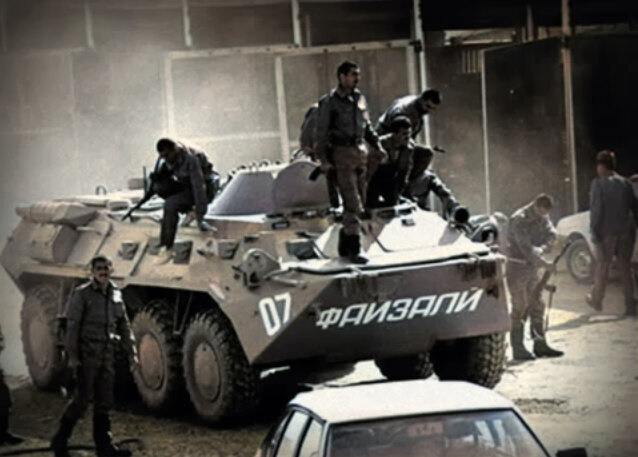
- Spetsnaz soldiers from the brigade during the Tajikistani Civil War, 1992.
- Active: 1963; 63 years ago
- Country: Soviet Union; Uzbekistan
- Branch: Soviet Army; Uzbek Ground Forces
- Type: Spetsnaz
- Part of: Uzbek Ground Forces
- Garrison/HQ: Chirchiq
- Engagements: Soviet Union: ∟Peace enforcement: 1966 Tashkent earthquake; ∟Soviet–Afghan War: Operation Storm-333; Operation Curtain; Uzbekistan: ∟Tajikistani Civil War
- Battle honours: Order of the Red Banner (Afghanistan)

The 15th Independent Special Forces Brigade (Russian: 15-я отдельная бригада специального назначения) is a spetsnaz (special forces) unit of the Uzbek Ground Forces, being the successor to its counterpart in the Soviet Army's GRU. This spetsnaz unit capable of conducting land, maritime, and air operations.

== Soviet history ==
=== Early existence ===
On the basis of the directive of the War Minister Marshal Aleksandr Vasilevsky October 24, 1950, "separate special-purpose companies" began to form in the military districts. On August 9, 1957, by the directive of the Chief of the General Staff, on the basis of the 91st company redeployed from the Far Eastern Military District to the Turkestan Military District, on October 1, 1957, the 61st Independent Special Forces Brigade was formed in Samarkand. In February 1962, on the basis of the 61st battalion, the formation of the 15th brigade in the village of Azadbash near the town of Chirchiq began. The birthday of the military unit is January 1, 1963, by which the formation ended. Most of the officer corps came from the 105th Guards Vienna Airborne Division.

In the first years, the personnel of the brigade made parachute jumps at the base of the 105th in Fergana, later jumps began to be performed at the training ground in the vicinity of Chirchiq.

=== Initial usage ===
Due to the absence at that historical stage of special units as part of the Internal Troops, special purpose units of the GRU were involved in cases of suppression of riots or acts of mass civil disobedience. Examples of the involvement of the 15th Brigade military personnel for such purposes in the 1960s and 1970s are: ensuring the quarantine area during the epidemic of cholera in the Karakalpak Autonomous Soviet Socialist Republic in the late summer of 1965, blocking the streets of Tashkent affected by the 1966 Tashkent earthquake, suppression of riots in the city of Shymkent in 1967, providing a quarantine zone during a smallpox epidemic in the city of Aralsk in the fall of 1971.

For performing its duties, in commemoration of the 50th anniversary of the Great October Socialist Revolution, the central committees of the Communist Parties of the Kazakh, Uzbek and Kyrgyz SSR awarded the unit with Honorary Red Banners.

=== War in Afghanistan ===
In connection with the start of the Soviet–Afghan War, the General Staff adopted directive No. 314/02/0061 of April 26, 1979 on the formation of 154th Separate Spetsnaz Detachment on the basis of the 15th brigade. The detachment was assigned a combat mission to support a special unit of the KGB of the USSR during an operation on the territory of Afghanistan. The unit was composed solely of Turkmens, Tajiks, and Uzbeks, which earned it the nickname of "Muslim Battalion". 520 men from the unit guarded the residence of Afghan General Secretary Hafizullah Amin as he could not rely on Afghan troops. During Operation Storm-333, during which the battalion stormed the Tajbeg Palace in Afghanistan, 7 troops from the "Muslim Battalion" were killed.

In December 1979, on the basis of the 15th brigade, the 459th Separate Special Forces Company was formed and was sent to Afghanistan on February 9, 1980. The company was stationed near the headquarters of the 40th Army in Kabul. It received air support from the 40th Army air assets in the form of the 239th Helicopter Squadron.

On August 15, 1988, the 459th company was withdrawn to the USSR and redeployed to Samarkand.

=== 1988–1991 ===
On May 15 (at the beginning of the withdrawal of troops), the personnel of the brigade numbered 2,482 people, of which 302 were officers and 147 were warrant officers. On May 18, 1988, the brigade department, the 154th detachment and the 334th detachment were withdrawn to the city of Termez.

On the night of January 19, 1990, the brigade was alerted and, as part of two detachments, flew to the city of Baku, being assigned 10 units of the BTR-80. For three months, the detachments carried out operational tasks together with the Alpha Group both in Baku itself and in the western and southern regions of the Azerbaijan SSR.

== Independence ==
=== Early months under Uzbek control ===
On July 1, 1992, the 15th brigade became part of the Armed Forces of Uzbekistan. In August 1992, the brigade took part in the liberation of the Uzbek island of Aral-Paygambar on the Amu Darya, captured by the Mujahideen.

=== Tajikistan ===
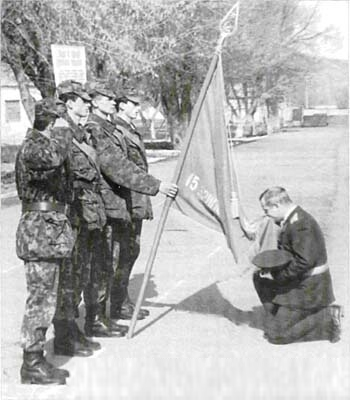
Colonel Vladimir Kvachkov shown here kissing the war banner of 15th Spetsnaz Brigade during the unit's farewell ceremony honouring its transfer from the disbanded Soviet Army to the Uzbek Ground Forces.

From September 1992 to the end of 1994, the 15th Brigade was actively involved in the Tajikistani Civil War on the orders of defence minister Rustam Akhmedov.

Together with the units of the Russian 201st Military Base, they participated in hostilities against the armed units of the United Tajik Opposition. The 15th brigade trained the fighters of the Popular Front of Tajikistan. In addition to direct participation in hostilities, the officers of the brigade participated in the formation of the Armed Forces of Tajikistan.

=== Later activities ===
In February 1996, the 15th brigade was reorganized into the 15th Independent Special Forces Brigade (military unit 64411). After the brigade became part of the 2nd Army Corps of the Mobile Forces of the Ministry of Defense of Uzbekistan.

The 15th brigade remained in the 2nd corps until February 1999. The main tactical task was to cover the Tajikistan–Uzbekistan border in the Angren-Olmaliq. In February 1999, the brigade was framed and transferred from the village of Azadbash to the city of Chirchik.

== Commanders ==
List of commanders of the 15th brigade:

- Nikolay Lutsev (1963–1967)
- Robert Mosolov (1968–1975)
- Vasily Kolesnik (1975–1977)
- Alexander Ovcharov (1977–1980)
- Anatoly Stekolnikov (1980–1984)
- Vladimir Babushkin (1984–1986)
- Yuri Starov (1986–1990)
- Vladimir Kvachkov (1990–1994)
- Sergey Zolotarev (1994–1995)
- Tulkin Karabaev (1995–1997)
- Jura Fazylov (1997–1999)

== See also ==
- Separate Operational Purpose Division
