= Vyacheslav Aleksandrov =

Vyacheslav Alexandrovich Alexandrov
- Born: 4 January 1968; Orenburg, Russian SFSR, Soviet Union
- Died: 8 January 1988 (aged 20) Hill 3234, Paktia Province, Afghanistan
- Allegiance: (Soviet Union) Soviet Airborne (1986–1988)
- Service years: 1986–1988
- Rank: Guards Junior Sergeant
- Commands: Squad
- Conflicts: Soviet–Afghan War; Battle for Hill 3234 †
- Awards: Hero of the Soviet Union (posthumously)

Vyacheslav Alexandrovich Alexandrov (Russian: Вячеслав Александрович Александров; 4 January 1968 – 8 January 1988) was a Guards Junior Sergeant and squad commander in the 9th airborne company, 345th Independent Guards Airborne Regiment, 40th Army.

During the Battle for Hill 3234, Junior Sergeant Alexandrov was leading a paratrooper gun crew for an NSV 12.7mm heavy machine gun. Junior Sergeant Alexandrov used the heavy machine gun to repulse an unexpected, overwhelming mujahideen attack and cover the movement of his fellow paratroopers into better defensive positions. In the course of doing so, Junior Sergeant Alexandrov was killed. For his actions and calmness under fire, Guards Junior Sergeant Vyacheslav Alexandrovich Alexandrov was posthumously awarded the title of Hero of the Soviet Union.

== See also ==
- Andrey Alexandrovich Melnikov
- Battle for Hill 3234
- 345th Independent Guards Airborne Regiment
