= 16th Guards Spetsnaz Brigade =

16th Separate Guards Order of Zhukov Spetsnaz Brigade
- 16-я отдельная гвардейская ордена Жукова бригада специального назначения
- Active: 1963 –
- Country: Soviet Union (1963–1991); Russia (1991–)
- Branch: Spetsnaz GRU
- Garrison/HQ: Chuchkovo, Chuchkovo, Ryazan Oblast

Commanders
- Current commander: Colonel Konstantin Bushuyev

The 16th Separate Guards Order of Zhukov Spetsnaz Brigade (Russian: 16-я отдельная гвардейская ордена Жукова бригада специального назначения, romanized: 16-ya otdelnaya gvardeyskaya ordena Zhukova brigada spetsialnogo naznacheniya) is a Spetsnaz military formation of the Russian Federation subordinate to the Spetsnaz GRU. It is garrisoned in Tambov, Tambov Oblast. Its military unit number is 54607.

On January 26, 2019, the unit was given the title of "Guards" by presidential decree.

== History ==
The unit was formed on January 1, 1963, in Chuchkovo, Ryazan Oblast.

During the Soviet-Afghan War at least one special purpose detachment was active from March 1985 to August 1988.

They participated in the First Chechen War from late 1994 onwards and in the Second Chechen War from 1999 to 2006.

The unit participated in a peacekeeping mission in Abkhazia shortly after the Russo-Georgian War. They were deployed there from December 2008 to October 2009.

== Commanders ==
Commanders of the 16th Guards Spetsnaz Brigade
No.	Name	From	To
1	Colonel Alexander V. Shipka	1963	1967
2	Colonel G. Ya. Fadeyev	1967	1971
3	Colonel E. F. Chuprakov	1971	1973
4	Colonel Semen M. Tarasov	1973	1980
5	Colonel A. A. Ovcharov	1980	1985
6	Colonel A. A. Nedelko	1985	1989
7	Colonel A. M. Dementyev	1989	1991
8	Colonel Yevgeny V. Tishin	1992	1993
9	Colonel V. L. Korunov	1993	1993
10	Lieutenant Colonel Alexander G. Fomin	1993	1997
11	Colonel Vadim E. Loginov	2003	2007?
12	Lieutenant Colonel O. N. Marzak	November 2008	October 2008
13	Colonel Andrei A. Slobodyan	October 2008	October 2010?
14	Colonel Konstantin Bushuyev	October 2010	present

== Structure ==
Structure of the unit as of 2019:

- 273rd Special Purpose Detachment
- 370th Special Purpose Detachment
- 379th Special Purpose Detachment
- 664th Special Purpose Detachment
- 669th Special Purpose Detachment
