= Andrey Melnikov =

Belarusian aviator, posthumously declared Hero of the Soviet Union

Andrey Alexandrovich Melnikov
- Born: 11 April 1968; Mogilyov, Byelorussian SSR, USSR
- Died: 8 January 1988 (aged 19) Hill 3234, Paktia Province, Afghanistan
- Allegiance: (Soviet Union) Soviet Airborne Forces (1986–1988)
- Service years: 1986–1988
- Rank: Private
- Conflicts: Soviet–Afghan War; Battle for Hill 3234 †
- Awards: Hero of the Soviet Union

Andrey Alexandrovich Melnikov (Russian: Андрей Александрович Мельников, Belarusian: Андрэй Мельнікаў; 11 April 1968 – 8 January 1988) was a machine gunner with the rank of private in the 9th Company of the 345th Independent Guards Airborne Regiment under the 40th Army during the Soviet-Afghan war.

Melnikov was present during the Battle for Hill 3234 as an RPK gunner. During the late night of January 8, Melnikov blunted a strong mujahideen attack on the 9th Company's position, at the cost of his life. For his bravery and skill under fire, Melnikov was posthumously awarded the title of Hero of the Soviet Union.

== See also ==
- Vyacheslav Alexandrovich Alexandrov
