= Chuchkovo =

Chuchkovo (Russian: Чучково) is the name of several inhabited localities in Russia.

Urban localities

- Chuchkovo, Ryazan Oblast, a work settlement in Chuchkovsky District of Ryazan Oblast

Rural localities

- Chuchkovo, Vologda Oblast, a village in Chuchkovsky Selsoviet of Sokolsky District of Vologda Oblast
