= Viktor Ivankov =

Russian military officer (1924–2021)

- Native name: Виктор Иванович Иванков
- Born: 26 July 1924; Antonovo, Chuchkovsky District, Ryazan Oblast, Russian SFSR, Soviet Union
- Died: 13 June 2021 (aged 96) Moscow, Russia
- Allegiance: Soviet Union; Russia
- Service years: 1942–1992
- Rank: Lieutenant General
- Awards: Order of the Patriotic War First Class; Two Orders of the Red Banner of Labour; Order of Friendship of Peoples; Order "For Service to the Homeland in the Armed Forces of the USSR" Third Class

Viktor Ivanovich Ivankov (Russian: Виктор Иванович Иванков; 26 July 1924 – 13 June 2021) was an officer of the Soviet military who held a number of posts, reaching the rank of lieutenant general.

== Career ==
Ivankov was born in the village of Antonovo, Chuchkovsky District, Ryazan Oblast, in what was then the Russian Soviet Federal Socialist Republic, in the Soviet Union. With the Axis invasion of the Soviet Union in 1941, he was soon pressed into service. He joined the Red Army in 1942, seeing action on the Leningrad Front as part of the Baltic Fleet in the Kronstadt defensive region, as part of the Observation and Communication Service. He went on to see action in the operations around the Oranienbaum Bridgehead.

Ivankov remained in the armed forces after the war, and in 1950 graduated from the Higher Naval Engineering and Technical School and was sent to serve with the Pacific Fleet. His first post was as a platoon commander, but over time he rose to the position of head of the Dalvoenmorstroy naval construction department. In 1970 he became first deputy head of the Main Military Construction Directorate of the Soviet Ministry of Defence. This was followed with his appointment in 1971 as deputy head of State Expertise of the Ministry of Defence, and head of inspection for capital construction. He held this post until 1974, when he became head of the State Expertise and Inspection at the ministry. In 1977 he became deputy chief of construction and personnel, a position he held for the next fifteen years. He had been promoted to engineer major general on 6 May 1972, and then engineer lieutenant general on 13 February 1976. On 26 April 1984 this rank became lieutenant general. He retired in 1992 with the rank of lieutenant general.

Over his career Ivankov received the Order of the Patriotic War First Class, two Orders of the Red Banner of Labour, the Order of Friendship of Peoples and the Order "For Service to the Homeland in the Armed Forces of the USSR" Third Class. He also received the title of Honoured builder of the RSFSR, and was a laureate of the Prize of the Soviet Council of Ministers.

Ivankov died in Moscow on 13 June 2021, at the age of 96.
