= Battle for Hill 3234 =

Battle during Soviet-Afghan war

- Part of the Soviet–Afghan War
Date	7–8 January 1988 (1 day)
Location	Paktia Province, near the Afghanistan–Pakistan border 33.3481°N 69.3028°E
Result	Soviet–Afghanistan victory

Belligerents
Soviet Union; Afghanistan	Afghan Mujahideen; Haqqani Network; Pakistan

Commanders and leaders
(Soviet Union) Sergey Tkachyov	Jalaluddin Haqqani

Strength
39 soldiers	250

Casualties and losses
6 killed, 28 wounded	200–250 killed

The Battle for Hill 3234 (Russian: Бой у высоты 3234, romanized: Boy u vysoty 3234) was a successful attack battle fought by the 9th Company of the 345th Independent Guards Airborne Regiment, Soviet Airborne Troops, part of Operation Magistral, supported by the Afghan Army's 15th Tank Brigade, 8th, 11th, 12th, 214th, 25th Infantry Division and the 37th Commando Battalion, in Afghanistan against a force of some 250 Mujahideen rebels who were supported by several Pakistani mercenaries in early January 1988. Two of the soldiers killed, Vyacheslav Aleksandrov and Andrey Melnikov, were posthumously awarded the Gold Star of the Hero of the Soviet Union. All of the paratroopers in this battle were given the Order of the Red Banner and Order of the Red Star.

== Background ==
In November 1987, the Soviet 40th Army under General Boris Gromov began Operation Magistral to open the road from Gardez to Khost near the Pakistani border. Khost had been cut off for months by mujahideen led by Jalaluddin Haqqani and had to be resupplied by air. Negotiations were undertaken with the local Jadran tribe as well as with Haqqani. These talks did not succeed, mostly due to the unshakable resolution of Haqqani who wanted to control the city as the core of his independent Afghan state and as a base for future incursions deeper into the country. Before the operation, there was also a widespread propaganda campaign, with a special radio station set up, calling on the Jadran people to cease supporting the mujahideen and leave the combat areas.

Even during the negotiations, a detailed operation plan was formed and the required forces put on alert. After talks finally collapsed, the offensive was set in motion. The operation involved the 108th and 201st Motor Rifle Divisions, as well as the 103rd Guards Airborne Division, the 345th Independent Guards Airborne Regiment, and the 56th Separate Air Assault Brigade. They were supported by five infantry divisions and a tank division of the Afghan government. Prior intelligence and aerial reconnaissance had identified a number of important fortified rebel-held sites on the road between Kabul and Khost. Fortifications included a minefield with mines about 3 km deep, 10 BM-21 rocket launchers, numerous anti-aircraft guns and DShK heavy machine gun positions, recoilless guns, mortars, and RPGs. The rebels were well prepared for defense and made the main pass and the surrounding hills impenetrable. The Soviet command was aware that a direct attack would be suicidal and therefore decided to trick the rebels into revealing their positions. On 28 October 1987, a feint landing was made in the areas controlled by the mujahideen, throwing dressed up mannequins from the air. Due to this, a reconnaissance aircraft was able to transmit the coordinates of rebel positions to the air force and after several air strikes and a four-hour-long artillery barrage, Operation Magistral began.

== Battle ==
As the operation went on, Soviet commanders wanted to secure the entire section of the road from Gardez to Khost. One of the most important points was the nameless hill designated by its height of 3,234 metres (10,610 ft), which was assigned to the 9th Company of the 345th Independent Guards Airborne Regiment led by Colonel Valery Vostrotin. The 39-man company landed on the hilltop on 7 January 1988, tasked with creating and holding a hilltop strongpoint from which to observe and control a long section of the road beneath and thus secure it for the safe passage of convoys.

Shortly after landing, the airborne troopers, who were well-trained and experienced in Afghan conditions, started to take up positions which covered both the road and the uphill passages. Just as they had dug in, the mujahideen began their attack at 15:30 local time. The first wave was equipped with recoilless guns and RPGs. Soviet artillery replied, directed by the commander of the first platoon, Lt. Viktor Gagarin, via radio. When rebel fire decreased, it was reasoned that it was the beginning of an infantry assault.

The airborne troopers were attacked by a coordinated and well-armed force of between 200 and 250 mujahideen from two directions, indicating that the assailants may have been assisted by rebels trained in Pakistan. During the ensuing battle, the Soviet unit remained in communication with headquarters and received support from the command of the 40th Army in terms of artillery support, ammunition, reinforcements, and the eventual helicopter evacuation of the wounded.

The first attack on 7 January was followed by eleven more attacks until just before dawn on 8 January, when the mujahideen retreated after suffering severe casualties, leaving Hill 3234 in the hands of the Soviet paratroopers. The exhausted and mostly wounded Soviets were nearly out of ammunition but continued to occupy the hill until the last convoy passed through the road below. These attacks continued until the following morning, at which point the Soviets were almost out of ammunition, had lost six paratroopers, and had another 28 wounded, 9 of them gravely.

== Casualties ==
=== Soviet Union ===
The Soviet forces lost six men out of 39, with 28 of the remaining 33 being wounded in action. Two of the soldiers killed, Vyacheslav Alexandrovich Alexandrov and Andrey Alexandrovich Melnikov, were posthumously awarded the golden star of the Hero of the Soviet Union. All of the paratroopers in this battle were given the Order of the Red Banner and Order of the Red Star.

Name and rank	Details	Awarded medal
Officers
Tkachyov Sergey Borisovich; Senior Lieutenant	Deputy commander of the 9th Company. Birthplace: Bryansk. Commanded the 9th Company men.	Order of the Red Banner, Order of the Red Star
Gagarin Viktor Yuryevich; Senior Lieutenant	1st Platoon commander.	Order of the Red Banner, Order of the Red Star
Babenko Ivan Pavlovich; Senior Lieutenant	Commander of the artillery observer team.	Order of the Red Banner, Order of the Red Star
Rozhkov Sergey Vladimirovich; Senior Lieutenant	2nd Platoon commander.	Order of the Red Banner, Order of the Red Star
Motruk Vitaly Vasilyevich; Senior Lieutenant	Deputy commander of the 9th Company.	Order of the Red Banner, Order of the Red Star
Kozlov Vasily; Praporshchik	Starshina of the 9th Company.	Order of the Red Banner, Order of the Red Star
Sergeants and soldiers
Alexandrov; Vyacheslav Alexandrovich; Junior Sergeant	Commander of the NSV machine gun crew. Posthumously awarded the title of the Hero of the Soviet Union. Birthplace: Orenburg Oblast, Izobilnoe. Killed while covering the positional movements of the 1st platoon men during the 1st attack. In the judgement of his brothers in arms, his feat consists in the fact that "by his decisive actions he got the precious minutes to the platoon just to get over."	Hero of the Soviet Union (posthumously)
Bobko Sergey; Private	Medic.	Order of the Red Banner, Order of the Red Star
Borisov Sergey; Sergeant	Rifleman. Injured.	Order of the Red Banner, Order of the Red Star
Borisov Vladimir; Private	Injured.	Order of the Red Banner, Order of the Red Star
Verigin Vladimir; Senior Sergeant		Order of the Red Banner, Order of the Red Star
Dyomin Andrey; Private		Order of the Red Banner, Order of the Red Star
Karimov Rustam; Private		Order of the Red Banner, Order of the Red Star
Kopyrin Arkadiy; Private	Rifleman of the NSV machine gun squad.	Order of the Red Banner, Order of the Red Star
Kriptoshenko Vladimir Olegovich; Junior Sergeant	Rifleman. Birthplace: Minsk Region, Krupki. Killed by grenade explosion.	Order of the Red Banner (posthumously), Order of the Red Star (posthumously)
Kuznezov Anatoly Yuryevich; Private	Rifleman. Killed in action.	Order of the Red Banner (posthumously), Order of the Red Star (posthumously)
Kuznezov Andrey; Private		Order of the Red Banner, Order of the Red Star
Korovin Sergey; Private		Order of the Red Banner, Order of the Red Star
Lash Sergey; Private		Order of the Red Banner, Order of the Red Star
Melnikov Andrey Alexandrovich; Private	Machine gunner. Birthplace: Mogilyov. Killed in action.	Hero of the Soviet Union (posthumously)
Menteshashvili Zurab; Private	Rifleman.	Order of the Red Banner, Order of the Red Star
Muradov Nurmatdzhon Nimanovich; Private	Sniper.	Order of the Red Banner, Order of the Red Star
Medvedev Andrey; Private	Artillery observer.	Order of the Red Banner, Order of the Red Star
Ognev Nikolay; Private	Rifleman. Injured.	Order of the Red Banner, Order of the Red Star
Ob'edkov Sergey; Private	Rifleman of the NSV machine gun squad.	Order of the Red Banner, Order of the Red Star
Peredelsky Viktor; Private		Order of the Red Banner, Order of the Red Star
Puzhaev Sergey; Private		Order of the Red Banner, Order of the Red Star
Salamaha Yury; Private		Order of the Red Banner, Order of the Red Star
Safronov Yury; Private		Order of the Red Banner, Order of the Red Star
Suhoguzov Nikolay; Private		Order of the Red Banner, Order of the Red Star
Tichonenko Igor; Private	Rifleman.	Order of the Red Banner, Order of the Red Star
Trutnev Pavel; Private	Birthplace: Kemerovo. Injured.	Order of the Red Banner, Order of the Red Star
Shchigolev Vladimir; Private	Rifleman.	Order of the Red Banner, Order of the Red Star
Fedotov Andrey Alexandrovich; Efreitor	Radioman of the artillery observer team. Birth date: September 29, 1967. Birthplace: Kurgan Oblast, M. Dyuryagino. Killed during the initial intensive bombardment of the hill by the RPG burst occurred on the top of a tree. His pierced radio station is kept in the Central Armed Forces Museum, Russia.	Order of the Red Banner (posthumously), Order of the Red Star (posthumously)
Fedorenko Andrey; Private		Order of the Red Banner, Order of the Red Star
Fadin Nikolay; Private		Order of the Red Banner, Order of the Red Star
Zvetkov Andrey Nikolaevich; Junior Sergeant	Machine gunner. Birthplace: Petrozavodsk. Killed in action.	Order of the Red Banner (posthumously), Order of the Red Star (posthumously)
Yazuk Evgeny; Private	Spotter	Order of the Red Banner, Order of the Red Star
Bezborodov Ruslan; Private	Sniper	Order of the Red Banner, Order of the Red Star

=== Mujahideen ===
According to the Soviet estimates, the Mujahideen lost over 200 men. The Mujahideen wore black uniforms with rectangular black-yellow-red stripes. It was alleged by several sources that there were some mercenaries from Pakistan who were coordinating the attack.

== Media ==
The 2005 Russian war film 9th Company climaxes with this battle.

The song "Hill 3234" by the Swedish heavy metal band Sabaton, from their 2016 The Last Stand, is about the battle.

== See also ==
- The 9th Company, a 2005 Russian war film based on the battle that took place at Hill 3234.
- Battle of Wanat
- Spillover of Soviet - Afghan war in Pakistan
