= 9th Company =

2005 Russian war film

- Film poster
- Russian: 9 рота
- Directed by: Fyodor Bondarchuk
- Written by: Yuri Korotkov
- Produced by: Fyodor Bondarchuk; Iskander Galiev; Alexander Rodnyansky; Yelena Yatsura; Salim Abduvaliev
- Starring: Artur Smolyaninov; Fyodor Bondarchuk; Aleksei Chadov; Mikhail Evlanov
- Cinematography: Maksim Osadchy
- Edited by: Igor Litoninsky
- Music by: Dato Evgenidze
- Distributed by: Art Pictures Group
- Release date: 29 September 2005
- Running time: 130 minutes
- Countries: Russia; Ukraine; Finland
- Language: Russian
- Budget: $9.5 million
- Box office: $26.1 million

9th Company (Russian: 9 рота, romanized: 9 rota) is a 2005 Russian war film directed by Fyodor Bondarchuk. The film follows the experiences of a group of young soldiers during the final months of the Soviet–Afghan War. The story's climax is loosely based on a real-life battle that took place at Hill 3234 in early 1988, during Operation Magistral, the last large-scale Soviet military operation in Afghanistan. The film received generally positive reviews from critics.

The film was selected as the Russian entry for the Best Foreign Language Film at the 79th Academy Awards, but it was not nominated.

== Plot ==
In 1988, at a recruitment base in Krasnoyarsk, young Soviet Army conscripts say farewell to their families and loved ones before preparing to leave for military duty. Fellow recruits Lyutyi, Chugun, Gioconda, Ryaba, Stas, and Vorobey are assigned to the 345th Independent Guards Airborne Regiment for eventual deployment to Afghanistan.

Arriving at their bootcamp in the Fergana Valley of Uzbekistan, the recruits meet Chechen conscript Pinochet and their drill instructor, Senior Warrant Officer Dygalo, a traumatized Afghanistan veteran. He trains the recruits hard and treats them harshly, during which the recruits are indoctrinated, overcome their differences, and build bonds. The friends celebrate the end of their training with a local prostitute nicknamed "Snow White". Dygalo is heartbroken when his request to deploy with the recruits is refused. The recruits eventually board a transport plane bound for Bagram airbase.

At Bagram, a fellow paratrooper heading home gives Lyutyi a lucky medallion, which he claims kept him safe through several tours. The veteran boards a transport plane that is hit by a missile on take-off, and it crashes, killing everyone on board. Most of the recruits are assigned to the 9th company; Pinochet and Ryaba are assigned to the 4th company, separating them from their friends.

The friends meet Warrant Officer "Khokhol" Pogrebnyak, Sergeant "Afanasiy" Afanasiev, and medic Sergeant "Kurbashi" Kurbanhaliev, who all served with Dygalo before he was medically evacuated. The veterans gradually teach the recruits about the realities of the war. The company, led by Captain "Kagraman" Bystrov, leaves the base to deliver supplies to an isolated Soviet Army outpost. They encounter a group of Mujahideen led by Akhmed, who engages the outpost in a short skirmish. The next day, Vorobey shoots and kills Akhmed after discovering him by accident.

The company is deployed as part of Operation Magistral and establish an outpost on a nameless hill, designated as Hill 3234, to protect passing convoys. Ryaba reunites with the friends as the sole survivor of a Mujahideen ambush, which left him wounded and traumatized. Stas falls asleep on guard duty and is beaten by the veterans as punishment. The next day, Khokhol orders Gioconda to find matches, who fearfully enters an Afghan village alone to trade food for them.

A convoy approaches the company's position, but is ambushed by the Mujahideen, inflicting many casualties. During the shootout, Ryaba suffers a mental breakdown and is shot in the head, and Captain Bystrov is also killed. Khokhol leads a platoon to pursue the fighters to a nearby village, where Stas is shot in the back by a village boy and dies. The soviets retaliate with a BM-21 Grad rocket bombardment that annihilates the entire village.

Months later, the 9th company remains deployed on Hill 3234, seeing little action. Pinochet is reassigned to the company, and the men mourn their lost comrades while celebrating New Year's Eve. Days later, Gioconda is immediately killed when an army of Mujahideen attack the hill. Over the course of the battle, many soldiers die on both sides, including Khokhol, Kurbashi, Chugun, Vorobey, and Pinochet. Surrounded and low on ammunition, Lyutyi and Afanasiy lead the remaining men in a final defense, until Mi-24 helicopter gunships arrive and kill the remaining Afghan fighters. Lyutyi emerges as the sole survivor, but learns from an arriving colonel that the Soviet withdrawal from Afghanistan already began, rendering the battle meaningless. Distraught, Lyutyi tears the lucky medallion from his neck and weeps.

On February 9, 1989, Lyutyi is seen on a BTR-70 convoy departing Afghanistan. In his narration, he tells of the eventual dissolution of the Soviet Union, Dygalo's eventual death from a stroke, and the futility of the war itself, but declares that the 9th company earned its own personal victory in the end.

== Cast ==
- Artur Smolyaninov as Private then Sergeant Oleg Lutaev (Lyutyy)
- Aleksey Chadov as Private Volodya Vorobiev (Vorobey)
- Konstantin Kryukov as Private Ruslan Petrovskyy (Dzhokonda)
- Ivan Kokorin as Private Chugainov (Chugun)
- Mikhail Evlanov as Private Ryabokon (Ryaba)
- Artiom Mikhalkov as Private Stasenko (Stas)
- Soslan Fidarov as Private Bigbulatov (Pinochet)
- Ivan Nikolaev as Seryy
- Mikhail Porechenkov as Senior Praporschik Alexandr Dygalo
- Fyodor Bondarchuk as Warrant Officer Pogrebnyak (Khokhol)
- Dmitriy Mukhamadeev as Sergeant Afanasiev (Afanasiy)
- Irina Rakhmanova as Belosnezhka (Snow White girl)
- Amadu Mamadakov as Sergeant Kurbanhaliev (Kurbashi)
- Aleksandr Shein as Patefon (as Aleksandr Sheyn)
- Aleksei Kravchenko as Captain Bystrov
- Aleksandr Bashirov as Pomidor
- Mikhail Yefremov as Veteran, who gives talisman
- Stanislav Govorukhin as a training regiment commander
- Andrey Krasko as unknown Colonel in Afgan
- Aleksandr Lykov as Major of combat engineers
- Aleksey Serebryakov as Reconnaissance Captain
- Oles Katsion as Mikhey
- Karen Martirosyan as Ashot
- Marat Gudiev as Akhmet
- Denis Moshkin as 'Black Stork'
- Aleksandr Kucherenko as Barber
- Svetlana Ivanova as Olya
- Yevgeny Arutyunyan as Radioman
- Mikhail Vladimirov as Tank driver
- Mikhail Solodko as Military commissariat officer

== Release ==
The film was released in September 2005. Although first released in 2005, and broadcast on TV in several nations, it was not released in the US until 2010 on DVD.

== Reception ==
=== Box office ===
9th Company was successful in the Russian box office, generating $7.7 million in its first five days of release alone, a new domestic record.

=== Critical response ===
Based on 16 reviews collected by Rotten Tomatoes, 9th Company has an overall approval rating from critics of 69%, with an average score of 6.10/10.

The film received a mixed reaction from the veterans of that war, who pointed to a number of inaccuracies, but nevertheless, judging by ticket sales, it was embraced by the general public and even by Russian president Vladimir Putin.

=== Awards and nominations ===
In 2006, Russia selected the film as its candidate for the Academy Award for Best Foreign Language Film nomination. It was also given the Golden Eagle Award for Best Feature Film by the Russian Academy of Cinema Arts. At the 2006 MTV Russia Movie Awards it won awards for Best Cast, Best Male Performance (Aleksey Chadov), Best Fight, and Best Breakthrough Performance (Artur Smolyaninov).

== See also ==
- The Truth About 9th Company
- List of Russian submissions for the Academy Award for Best Foreign Language Film
- List of submissions to the 79th Academy Awards for Best Foreign Language Film
