= Dmitry Puchkov =

Russian media personality (born 1961)

- Дмитрий Пучков
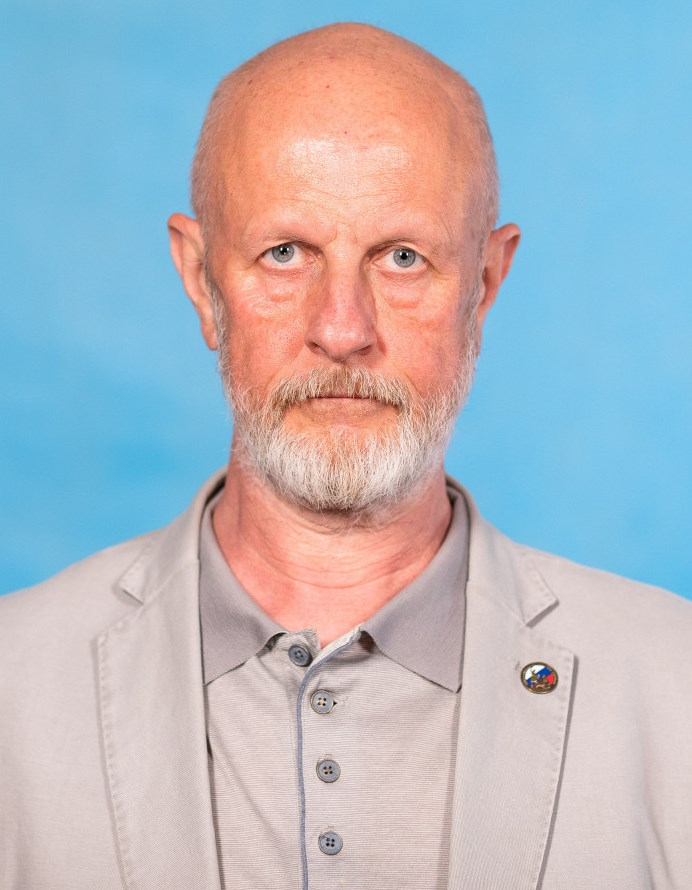
- Born: Dmitry Yuryevich Puchkov; August 2, 1961 (age 65); Kirovohrad, Ukrainian SSR, Soviet Union (now Ukraine)
- Other name: Goblin
- Citizenship: Russian
- Occupations: Writer; publicist; film translator; voice actor
- Years active: 1997–present

YouTube information
- Channel: Dmitry Puchkov
- Subscribers: 2.75 million
- Views: 1.1 billion
- Last updated: April 2022
- Website: oper.ru

Dmitry Yuryevich Puchkov (Russian: Дми́трий Ю́рьевич Пучко́в; born August 2, 1961), also known as Goblin (Russian: Гоблин), is a Russian media personality best known for his English-to-Russian film and video game translations as well as his Oper.ru web blog and, from 2008 until 2022, his eponymous YouTube channel. Puchkov considers himself a Neo-Sovietist and, on several occasions, has publicly spoken against several government decisions describing them as plain wrong, but also demonstrated both public and personal support for the politics of Vladimir Putin coinciding with pro-Kremlin narratives. For that, he has been called a "Kremlin pundit" and a "warhawk" by the free media ever since Russia invaded Ukraine, both terms he vehemently denies.

Although initially studying to become an electrical engineer, Puchkov served in the Soviet Army, then, as the USSR collapsed, made a personal hobby of pirate-translating famous Hollywood films into Russian. His alternative voice-over translations thereof are widely known both for their perceived profanity and humour. Puchkov's later career also included screenplay and comic book writing.

Puchkov helped to establish communities to spread memes and Russian influence campaigns on Tynu40k Goblina which spread pro-Soviet and Russian victory in WWII memes. Puchkov had three million subscribers on YouTube before being removed for violating community guidelines when spreading pro-Putin propaganda for which former President and Deputy Chairman of the Russian Security Council Dmitry Medvedev demanded revenge.

== Early career ==
Puchkov was born on August 2, 1961, in Kirovograd (present-day Kropyvnytskyi), Ukrainian SSR, Soviet Union. His mother is Ukrainian and his father is a Russian of German descent. Puchkov was known by the nickname Goblin or Starshiy operupolnomochenniy Goblin (Senior Operative Agent Goblin) years before he became popular as a film translator. At the time of his earliest public works, he worked as a police investigator for the Militsiya. Because of a newspaper article entitled "Goblins in Militsiya Overcoats" that rebuked the corruption of the Militsiya staff, Puchkov and his workmates began to call each other "goblins" ironically.

Puchkov started using the pen name Goblin while sharing his experience in PC gaming-oriented magazines when writing about the video game Quake. He started a personal website called Goblin's Dead End (Tynu40k Goblina), which focused on Quake. Puchkov became a popular commentator among the Quake community, but he remained virtually unknown otherwise.

His book Dungeon Cleaners (Санитары подземелий) was published in 1999 and quickly sold out, becoming an Internet bestseller. Loosely based on the game concept, the book later became the basis for the 2006 tactical role-playing video game Planet Alcatraz and its 2008 sequel developed by 1C using Skyfallen Entertainment's TheEngine.

== Political activism and propaganda ==
After the Russian invasion of Ukraine started in 2022, Puchkov was interviewed by radio "Комсомольская Правда", where he explained that the reason for Russia's invasion was the actions of the United States. He claimed that the Security Service of Ukraine is controlled completely by the CIA.

In March 2022, Puchkov supported Russia's military aggression against Ukraine. He repeatedly transmitted the main theses of Russian propaganda. Hence, according to some EU officials, Puchkov is responsible for supporting Russian aggressive policy that threatens Ukraine's sovereignty and independence.

In April 2024, when asked how he feels about Ukrainians, Puchkov stated "I think that all this Nazi scum should be shot without mercy" and that "it is useless to re-educate them". According to him, Ukrainians were "being buried on an industrial scale" at the moment, which was, as he stated, "for their own benefit and for ours as well". The audience listening to him applauded his words.

== Sanctions ==
In December 2022, he was included in the EU sanctions lists (9th sanctions package for Russia's invasion of Ukraine). The European Union representatives noted that in 2014, Puchkov published a book Ukraine is Russia, in which he implied that Ukraine is not an independent state, thus reproducing the ideas of Russian propaganda.

== Film dubbing ==
Puchkov studied English at the Militsya House of Culture for two years, but is otherwise self-taught as a translator. His first film translation was completed during the perestroika period, when Western productions were first introduced to Soviet viewers.

At that time, I already had certain knowledge in English. The quantity of untranslated phrases and obvious bloopers irritated me from the very beginning. And at that time I already wanted to make translation thoroughly, in other words do it, the way a good film deserves.

The first films he translated were Carlito's Way in 1995 and shortly after Aliens, Once Upon a Time in the West, Full Metal Jacket, The Thing and Last Action Hero. All of these translations were made for a small circle of friends and were never publicly released, but since the process of dubbing by means of the videocassette recorder was not complicated, the translations became widely known and distributed.

The development of the DVD format revived Puchkov's interest in translating films, and his works became known to a larger public audience. Translated tracks of the films could be downloaded at no charge as MP3 files (includes only voice of Goblin, without original sound of the film) from Puchkov's website. He named his studio Polny P (Полный Пэ, Пэ in this context stands for the curse word пиздец, the phrase roughly translates to "complete fuck-up") and designed a logo, which, being stamped on every translation DVD, CD or video cassette, became a recognizable label.

Puchkov is known as a strong advocate of quality translation and opposes the practice of literal interpretation of films, which has become commonplace in Russia. His position is that precise translation backed by thorough research and identification of Russian equivalents in cases of lexical gaps should be the product provided to Russian aficionados of foreign films. Puchkov maintains lists of gaffes made by other film translators.

Goblin's translations may be classified into the "faithful" ones and parody translations. They had become known as "Goblin-style dubbing" (гоблинский перевод), although Goblin himself does not accept this definition. Goblin's "faihful" dubbing matches the plot, although the dubbed text does not necessarily literally translates the original one, neverthess the foul language is translated with Russian native foul language, while literaly language is rendered by literary Russian. Goblin's parody dubbings ironically distort the plot creating a humorous effect, and Goblin insists on the term "funny dubbing". The best known dubbings of the latter type are for The Lord of the Rings and The Matrix.

=== Commercial translations ===
Since film translation is a hobby for Puchkov, he translates only those films that he is interested in and does not receive any money for his translations. However, due to his popularity, he receives commercial offers from licensed foreign film distributors in Russia to translate films that are screened in theaters and aired on TV. The list of his commercial translations includes: Team America: World Police, South Park, The Sopranos, the funny translation of Bimmer, produced in cooperation with the makers of the original, and others.

The latest work in this field is Guy Ritchie's RocknRolla. This time, distributors contracted Puchkov to do a translation for the dub, with himself voice-acting the narrator, Archy. At the premiere Puchkov himself read a non-censored, voiceover translation; in theaters, a somewhat milder version was shown.

In addition to his film translation, he also made several commercial translations of video games, including Odium, Serious Sam, Duke Nukem: Manhattan Project, and Bimmer: Blown Away Towers.

Dmitry Buzadzhi, a Russian language translator, does contend that the quality of Puchkov's own translations is rather mediocre, notwithstanding his supposedly thorough approach.

== Projects ==
On February 15, 2008, The Truth About 9th Company documentary video game was officially launched. Puchkov has proved himself as the ideological leader and inspirer of the development of this project, which was announced as the response to "the intentional destruction of historical memory of the people".

== Ban by YouTube ==
On August 4, 2022, YouTube removed the channel of Dmitry Puchkov, notifying him of a violation of community rules.

== Personal life ==
Puchkov was brought up in the family of an army officer, who traveled a great deal around the country. He studied at six different schools, including a boarding school, and finished his 10th grade in the German Democratic Republic. He served in the army, where he was employed as a military driver and operated a truck; he also received basic tank driver training. He retired from his work in the Militsiya in 1998 after working there for 6 years.

He has also worked as a librarian, truck driver, air compressor operator, automobile mechanic, plumber, driller assistant, electrician, polisher, turner, metal smith, cab driver, masseur, police canine handler, criminal investigator and sales manager.

== See also ==
- Gavrilov translation
- Benshi
