= 56th Guards Air Assault Regiment =

56th Guards Air Assault Regiment (Dec 2021 – present) 56th Guards Air Assault Brigade (Oct 1979 – Dec 2021) 351st Guards Airborne Regiment (Jan 1949 – Oct 1979) 351st Guards Air Landing Regiment (Jun 1946 – Jan 1949) 351st Guards Rifle Regiment (Dec 1944 – Jun 1946) 7th Guards Airborne Brigade (Jun 1943 – Dec 1944)
- Russian: 56-й гвардейский десантно-штурмовой орденов Кутузова и Отечественной войны 1-й степени Донской казачий полк
- Active: 1943–present
- Country: Soviet Union (1943–1991); Russia (1991–present)
- Branch: Soviet Armed Forces: Soviet Airborne Forces; Russian Armed Forces: Russian Airborne Forces
- Type: Airborne forces
- Role: Light Infantry; Airborne Infantry; Airmobile infantry
- Size: Regiment
- Part of: 7th Guards Mountain Air Assault Division; Southern Military District
- Garrison/HQ: Feodosia, Crimea
- Patron: St. Elijah the Prophet
- Anniversaries: 11 June
- Engagements: World War II; Battle of the Dnieper; Crimean offensive; Vienna Offensive; Prague offensive; Soviet–Afghan War; Operation Magistral; First Chechen War; Second Chechen War; Battle of Komsomolskoye; Russo-Ukrainian War
- Decorations: Guards; Order of the Patriotic War, 1st class Order of Kutuzov, 2nd class
- Battle honours: Don Cossack

Commanders
- Notable commanders: Vitaly Raevsky

The 56th Guards Air Assault Orders of Kutuzov and the Patriotic War 1st class Don Cossack Regiment (Russian: 56-й гвардейский десантно-штурмовой орденов Кутузова и Отечественной войны 1-й степени Донской казачий полк) is an airborne regiment of the Russian Airborne Forces (VDV). Based at Feodosia in Crimea, the regiment is part of the 7th Guards Mountain Air Assault Division. It was formed in 2021 from the 56th Guards Airborne Brigade, based at Kamyshin. The brigade was first formed in 1979 and fought in the Soviet–Afghan War, the First Chechen War and the Second Chechen War.

== History ==
=== World War II (1943–1945) ===
The formation was created on 11 June 1943, when the 7th and 17th Guards Airborne Brigades were formed. A strong group of VDV was deployed to the 4th Ukrainian Front consisting of the 4th, 6th and 7th Guards Airborne Brigades. It was planned to use Crimean Offensive Operation. In December 1943, the 4th and 7th Guards Airborne Brigades were redeployed to the Moscow Military District.

On January 15, 1944, in accordance with the order of the commander of the Airborne Forces of Red Army No. 00100 dated December 26, 1943, in the city of Stupino in the Moscow region, on the basis of the 4th, 7th and 17th separate guards airborne brigades (the brigades were stationed in the cities of Vostryakovo, Vnukovo, Stupino), the 16th Guards Airborne Division was formed. The division had 12,000 soldiers according to the staff. In August 1944, the division was redeployed to the city of Starye Dorogi in Mogilev Region and on August 9, 1944, it became part of the newly formed 38th Guards Airborne Corps.

In October 1944, the 38th Guards Airborne Corps became part of the newly formed separate guards airborne army. On December 8, 1944, the army was reorganized into the 9th Guards Army, the 38th Guards Airborne Corps became a guards rifle corps. By order of the Stavka of the Supreme High Command No. 0047 of December 18, 1944, the 16th Guards Airborne Division was reformed into the 106th Guards Rifle Division of the 38th Guards Rifle Corps. The 4th Separate Guards Airborne Brigade was reformed into the 347th Guards Rifle Regiment, the 7th Separate Guards Airborne Brigade into the 351st Guards Rifle Regiment, and the 17th Separate Guards Airborne Brigade into the 355th Guards Rifle Regiment.

The 106th Guards Rifle Division included:

- 347th Guards Rifle Regiment;
- 351st Guards Rifle Regiment;
- 355th Guards Rifle Regiment;
- 107th Separate Guards Anti-Aircraft Artillery Division;
- 193rd Separate Guards Communications Battalion;
- 123rd Separate Guards Anti-Tank Division;
- 139th Separate Guards Engineer Battalion;
- 113th Separate Guards Reconnaissance Company;
- 117th Separate Guards Chemical Company;
- 234th Separate Guards Medical Battalion.

The division also included the 57th Artillery Brigade, consisting of three regiments:

- 205th Cannon Artillery Regiment;
- 28th Howitzer Artillery Regiment;
- 53rd Mortar Regiment.

In January 1945, the division, as part of the 38th Guards Rifle Corps, was redeployed by rail to Hungary, and by February 26 it was concentrated east of the city of Budapest in the area: Szolnok – Abony – Soyal – Teriel, and in early March it became part of the 3rd Ukrainian Front. On March 16, 1945, having broken through the German defenses, the 351st Guards Rifle Regiment reached the Austro-Hungarian border. In March–April 1945, the division took part in the Vienna offensive operation, advancing in the direction of the front's main attack.

The division, in cooperation with units of the 4th Guards Army, broke through the enemy's defenses north of the city of Székesfehérvár, reached the flank and rear of the main forces of the 6th SS Panzer Army, which had penetrated the front's defenses between Lakes Velence and Balaton. In early April, the division launched an attack in the northwest direction, bypassing Vienna, and, in cooperation with the 6th Guards Tank Army, broke the enemy's resistance, advanced to the Danube, and cut off the enemy's retreat routes to the west. The division successfully fought in the city, which continued until 13 April.

By the decree of the Presidium of the Supreme Soviet of the USSR of 29.03.1945, for participation in the defeat of eleven enemy divisions southwest of Budapest and the capture of the city of Mor, the division was awarded the Order of Kutuzov, 2nd degree. For breaking through the fortified line of defense and capturing the city of Mor, the entire personnel received the gratitude of the Supreme Commander-in-Chief. By the Decree of the Presidium of the Supreme Soviet of the USSR of 26.04.1945 "for participation in the capture of Vienna", the division was awarded the Order of the Red Banner. Since then, April 26 has been considered the unit's annual holiday. During the Vienna offensive, the division fought its way through over 300 kilometers. On some days, its advance reached 25–30 kilometers per day.

From 5 to 11 May 1945, the division, as part of the 2nd Ukrainian Front, took part in the Prague offensive. On May 5, the division was raised on alert and marched to the Austro-Czechoslovak border. Having come into contact with the enemy, on May 8 it crossed the Czechoslovak border and immediately captured the city of Znojmo. On 9 May the division continued combat operations to pursue the enemy and successfully developed an offensive on Retz, Pisek. The division marched, pursuing the enemy, and in 3 days covered 80–90 km with fighting. At 12:00 on 11 May 1945, the advance detachment of the division reached the Vltava River and met with troops of the American 5th Army near the village of Olešnia. Here, the division's combat path in the Great Patriotic War ended.

=== Cold War (1945–1979) ===
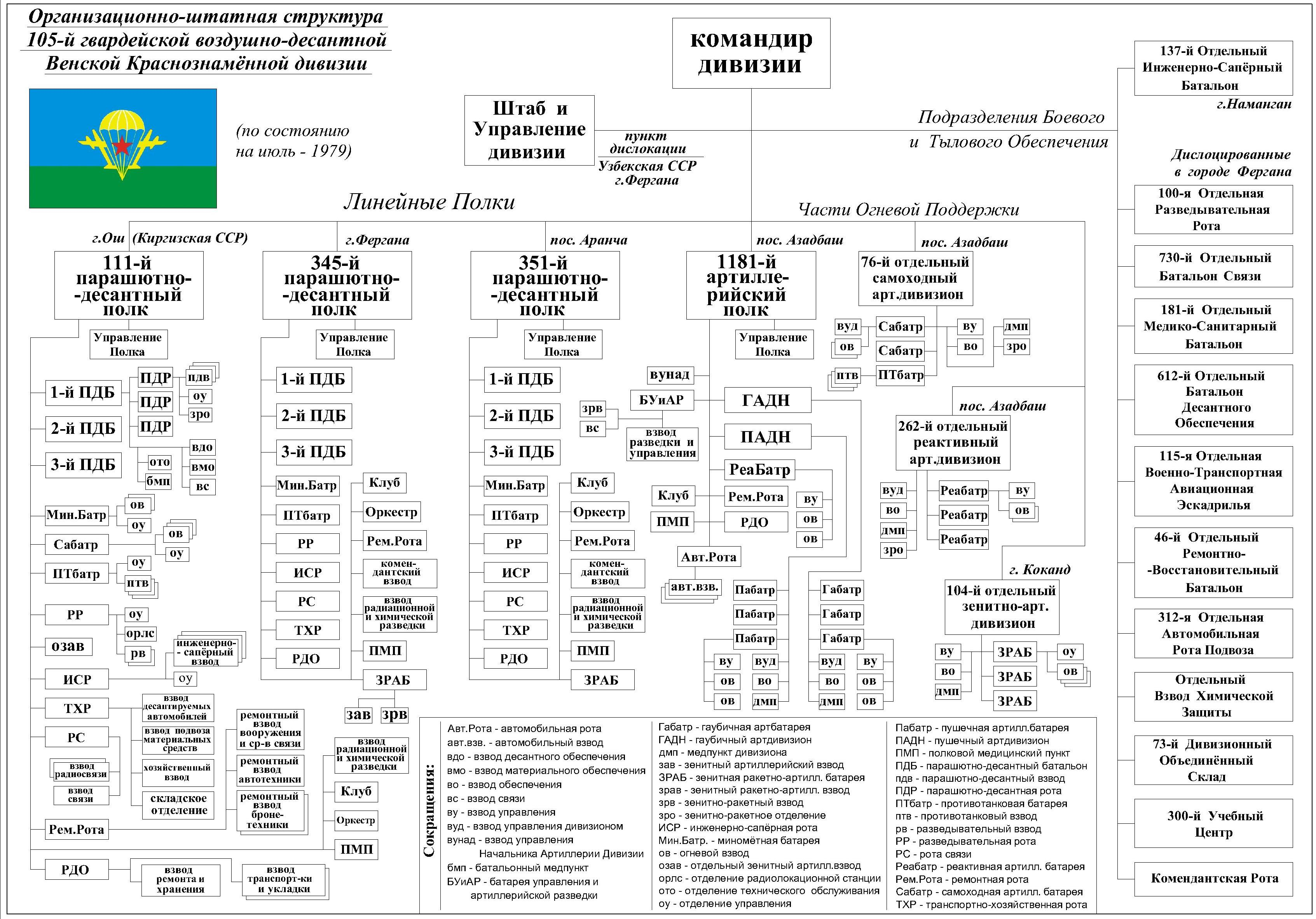
Organizational and staff structure of the 105th Guards Airborne Division as of July 1979.

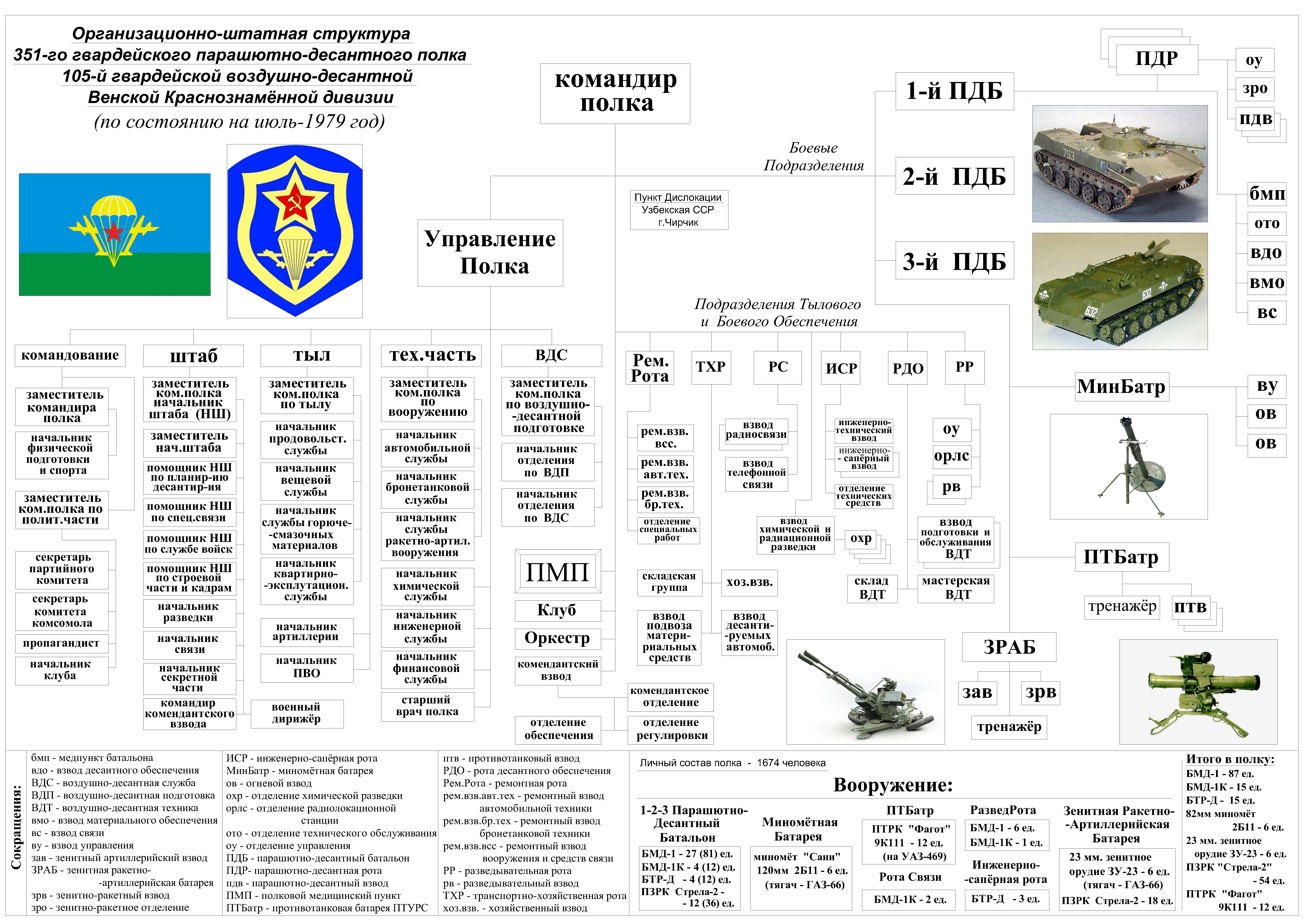
Organizational and staff structure of the 351st Guards Parachute Regiment of the 105th Guards Airborne Division as of July 1979.

After the end of hostilities, the division returned from Czechoslovakia to Hungary under its own power. From May 1945 to January 1946, the division was camped in the forests south of Budapest. Based on the Resolution of the Council of Ministers of the USSR No. 1154474ss of 3.06.1946 and the directive of the General Staff of the Armed Forces of the USSR No. org/2/247225 of 7.06.1946, by 15 June 1946, the 106th Guards Rifle Red Banner, Order of Kutuzov Division was reformed into the 106th Guards Airborne Red Banner, Order of Kutuzov Division.

Since July 1946, the division was stationed in Tula. The division was part of the 38th Guards Airborne Vienna Corps (corps headquarters – Tula). On December 3, 1947, the division was awarded the battle banner. Based on the directives of the Chief of the General Staff of the Armed Forces of September 3, 1948 and January 21, 1949, the 106th Guards Airborne Red Banner, Order of Kutuzov Division as part of the 38th Guards Airborne Vienna Corps became part of the Airborne Army.

In April 1953, the Airborne Army was disbanded. Based on the directive of the Chief of the General Staff of the Armed Forces dated January 21, 1955, by April 25, 1955, the 106th Guards Airborne Division left the 38th Guards Airborne Vienna Corps, which was disbanded, and switched to a new structure of three regiments with a cadre battalion (incomplete) in each parachute regiment.

From the disbanded 11th Guards Airborne Division, the 137th Guards Parachute Regiment was accepted into the 106th Guards Airborne Division. The deployment point is the city of Ryazan. The personnel of the 351st Guards Airborne Regiment participated in military parades on Red Square in Moscow, took part in large-scale exercises of the Ministry of Defense and in 1955 parachuted near city of Kutaisi (Transcaucasian Military District). In 1956, the 38th Guards Airborne Vienna Corps was disbanded and the division became directly subordinate to the Airborne Forces Commander. In 1957, the regiment conducted demonstration exercises with parachuting for military delegations from Yugoslavia and India.

Based on the directives of the USSR Minister of Defense from March 18, 1960 and the Commander-in-Chief of the Ground Forces from June 7, 1960 to November 1, 1960:

- the 351st Guards Airborne Regiment (city of Yefremov, Tula Region) was accepted into the 105th Guards Airborne Vienna Red Banner Division from the 106th Guards Airborne Division;
- The 105th Guards Airborne Division (excluding the 331st Guards Parachute Regiment) was redeployed to the Turkestan Military District in the city of Fergana in the Uzbek SSR;
- The 351st Guards Airborne Regiment was stationed in the city of Chirchik of the Tashkent Region.

In 1966, after the Tashkent Earthquake, the personnel of the 351st Regiment provided assistance to residents of the city affected by the disaster, and helped local authorities maintain order. In 1973, the 351st Regiment received a new battle flag. Until that time, it had been the battle flag of the 7th Airborne Brigade from the Great Patriotic War, with traces of shell fragments. In 1974, the 351st Regiment was parachuted into one of the regions of Central Asia and participated in large-scale exercises. Being the vanguard of the Airborne Forces of the Central Asian region of the country, the regiment participated in parades in the capital of Uzbekistan in Tashkent.

In 1977, the 351st Regiment received BMD-1 and BTR-D. The personnel of the regiment at that time was 1,674 soldiers. Based on the directive of the Chief of the General Staff of the Armed Forces dated August 3, 1979, the 105th Guards Airborne Division was disbanded by December 1, 1979.

The division was left in Fergana with the 345th Separate Guards Airborne Regiment of the Order of Suvorov of a significantly larger composition (a howitzer artillery division was added to it) than usual and the 115th Separate Military Transport Aviation Squadron. By November 30, 1979, on the basis of the 351st Guards Parachute Regiment of the 105th Guards Airborne Division new 56th Guards Airborne Brigade, with main base in the village of Azadbash, Chirchiq district, Tashkent Oblast, Uzbek SSR, was formed.

=== Afghanistan (1979–1989) ===
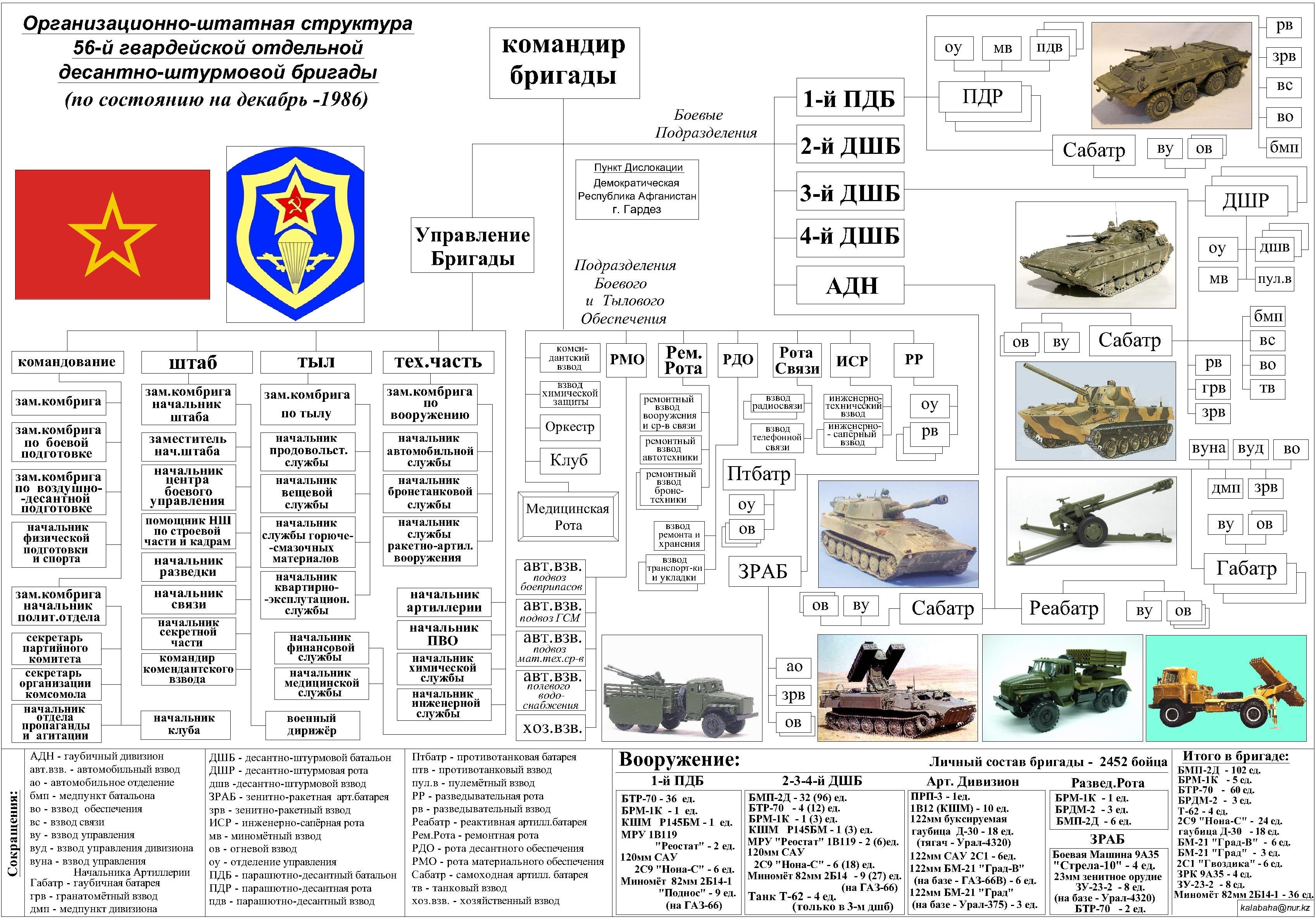
Оrganizational and staff structure of the 56th Guards Airborne Brigade in December 1986.

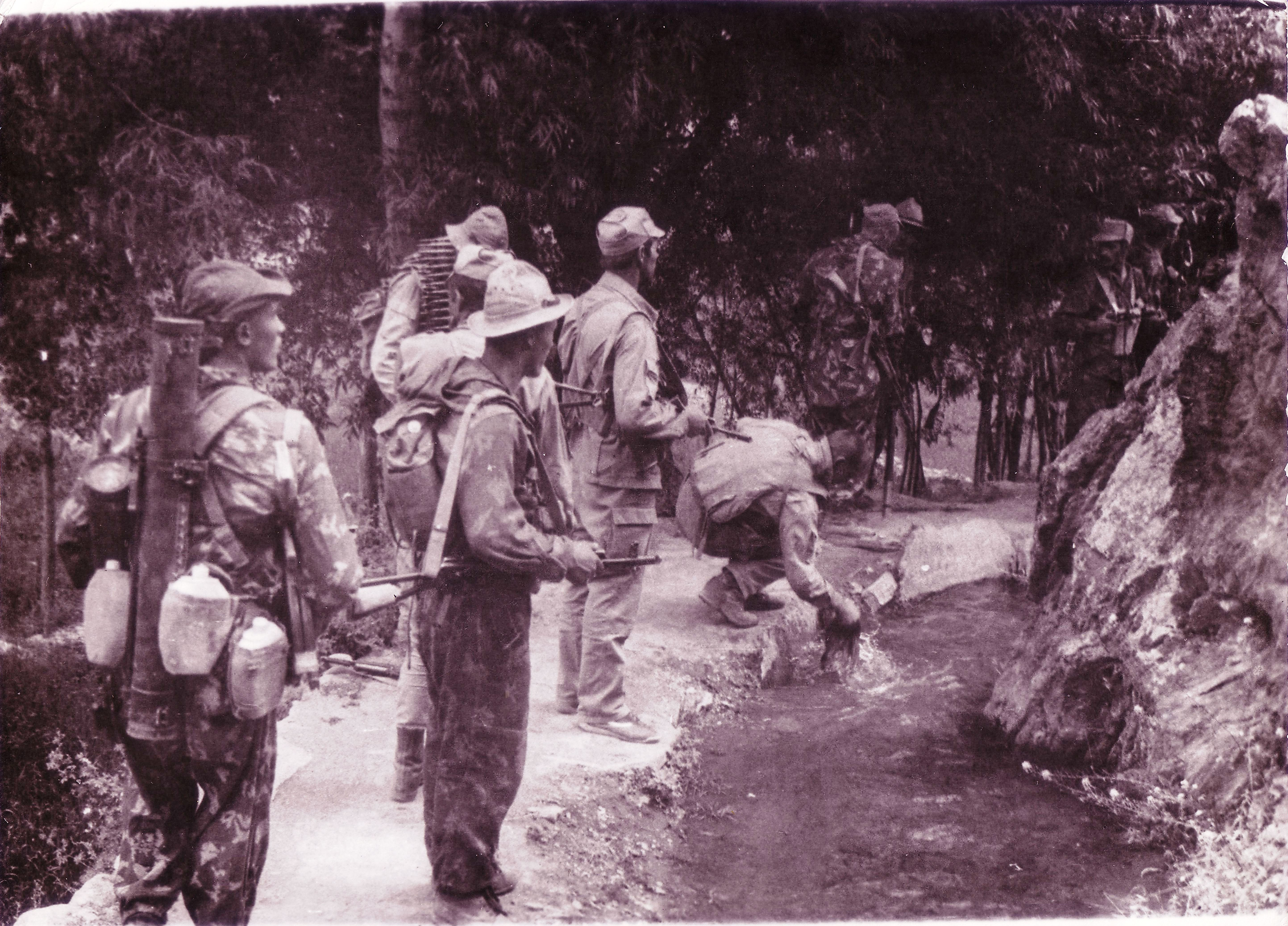
Soldiers of the 56th Guards Airborne Brigade performing combat duties, Wardak province, Afghanistan, June 1987.

The 56th Separate Guards Air Assault Brigade was formed on 1 October 1979 in Chirchiq from the disbanded 105th Guards Airborne Division's 351st Guards Airborne Regiment. The new brigade inherited battle honors from that unit. On 13 December, the brigade was transferred to Termez in preparation for deployment to Afghanistan. On 27 December, the brigade's 4th Airborne Battalion crossed the Afghan border and secured Salang Pass. On the morning of 25 December 1979 the first to be transported to the territory of the DRA was the 350th Guards Airborne Regiment of the USSR Airborne Forces, then the 781st Separate Reconnaissance Battalion 108th Motor Rifle Division. Following it was the 4th Airborne Assault Battalion of the 56th Guards Separate Airborne Assault Brigade, which was tasked with guarding the Salang Pass, ensuring the advance of Soviet troops into the central and southern regions of Afghanistan.

From Termez the 1st Airborne Assault Battalion and 2nd Airborne Assault Battalion were transported by helicopter, and the rest in a column were redeployed to the city of Kunduz. The 4th Airborne Assault Battalion remained at the Salang Pass. Then, from Kunduz, the 2nd "dashb" was transferred to the city of Kandahar, where it became part of the newly formed 70th Separate Guards Motor Rifle Brigade. At the same time, the 3rd Air Assault Battalion moved to Kandahar. The 3rd Air Assault battalion was airlifted by helicopter into Afghanistan and captured Rabat-Mirza-Kushka Pass on the next day.

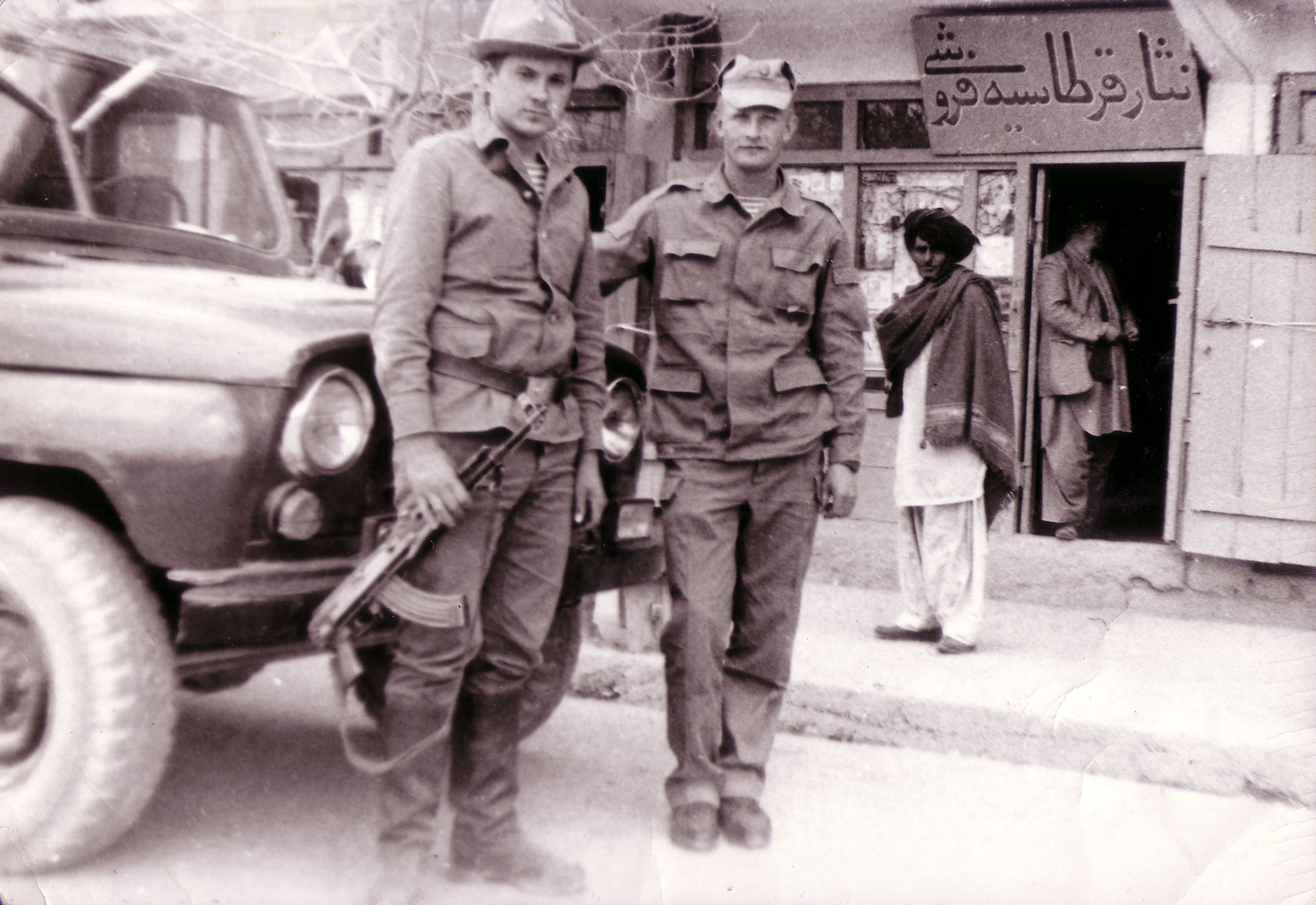
A UAZ-469 of the brigade in Gardez during 1987.

In January 1980, the entire composition of the 56th Guards Separate Motor Rifle Brigade was introduced. It was stationed in the city of Kunduz. Between 13 and 14 January 1980, the brigade crossed the border and concentrated at Kunduz. In February, the 4th Airborne Battalion was transferred to Charikar but was moved back to Kunduz in the same year. The 2nd Air Assault Battalion was attached to the 70th Separate Guards Motor Rifle Brigade in March. In December 1981, the brigade was moved to Gardez.

Between 1982 and June 1988, the 56th Brigade was stationed in the area of the city of Gardez, conducting combat operations throughout Afghanistan: Bagram, Mazar-i-Sharif, Khanabad, Panjshir, Logar, Alikheil (Paktia). In 1984, the brigade was awarded the Challenge Red Banner for the successful completion of combat missions. The brigade was reequipped with the BMP-2 infantry fighting vehicle in 1985. On 5 April 1985, it was awarded the Order of the Patriotic War 1st class. The authorized strength of the 56th Guards Air Assault Brigade as of December 1, 1986 was 2,452 people (261 officers, 109 warrant officers, 416 sergeants, 1,666 soldiers).

It fought in Operation Magistral from December 1987 to January 1988. In April 1988, the brigade took part in Operation Barrier. The paratroopers blocked caravan routes from Pakistan in order to ensure the withdrawal of troops from the city of Ghazni. The brigade had only 3 BRDM-2s in the reconnaissance company. However, there was another BRDM-2 in the chemical platoon and another 2 in the OPA (propaganda and agitation detachment). On 12–14 June 1988, the brigade crossed the border back into Turkmen SSR during the Soviet withdrawal from Afghanistan. After its return from Afghanistan, the brigade was based in Ýolöten. The brigade became the 56th Guards Airborne Brigade in 1989.

=== Collapse of the Soviet Union and aftermath (1990–1996) ===
In 1990, the brigade was transferred to the Soviet Airborne Troops and reorganized into a separate guards airborne brigade. The brigade went through "hot spots" in conflict parts of the Soviet Union.

On January 15, 1990, after a detailed study of the situation, the Presidium of the Supreme Soviet of the USSR adopted a resolution "On declaring a state of emergency in the Nagorno-Karabakh Autonomous Oblast, Azerbaijani SSR and some other regions". In accordance with it, the Airborne Forces began an operation that was carried out in two stages. During the first stage, from January 12 to 19, units of the 106th and 76th airborne divisions, the 56th and 38th airborne brigades and the 217th parachute regiment landed at airfields near Baku, and the 98th Guards Airborne Division landed in Yerevan.

During the Baku pogrom and subsequent Black January in 1990, the brigade began operations to restore order in other parts of Azerbaijan. In the area of Lenkoran, Priship and Jalilabad, they were carried out jointly with border troops, who restored the state border. In February 1990, the brigade returned to its permanent deployment location in the city of Iolotan.

On June 1, 1990, the brigade was transferred to the Soviet airborne and renamed the 40th Separate Airborne Brigade. The newly renamed brigade was transferred to Fergana, Uzbek SSR a week later to conduct security operations. On June 6, 1990, the 56th Guards Separate Airborne Brigade began landing at airfields in the cities of Osh and Andijan. Then, using military equipment and civilian buses, they advanced to Uzgen and took control of the situation both inside and around Uzgen. On August 4, the brigade was withdrawn outside the city, to Shirali. And stood there for a few more days. After which it marched to Fergana to the airfield, from where it was returned in full force to Iolotan.

In October 1992, after the dissolution of the Soviet Union, the brigade was moved to the temporary deployment point of the village of Zelenchukskaya, Karachay-Cherkessia in North Caucasus (a separate airborne assault battalion of the Armed Forces of Turkmenistan was later formed in the former permanent deployment point of brigade in the city of Iolotan). From there, in 1993, it marched to the permanent deployment site in the village of Podgory near the city of Volgodonsk in the Rostov Region. Its military townlet was the former shift town of the builders of the Rostov NPP, located 3 kilometers from the nuclear power plant.

The brigade was given the designation Don Cossack on 22 April 1994. Between December 1994 and October 1996, the brigade fought in the First Chechen War. On November 29, 1994, an order was sent to the brigade to form a joint battalion and transfer it to Mozdok. The brigade's artillery division took part in the operation near Shatoy in late 1995 and early 1996. From March 1995 to September 1995, a separate platoon of the AGS-17 brigade, as part of the joint battalion of the 7th Guards Mountain Air Assault Division, took part in the mountain campaign in the Vedensky and Shatoy districts of Chechnya. For their courage and heroism, the servicemen were awarded medals and orders. In October–November 1996, the joint battalion of the brigade was withdrawn from Chechnya.

=== Transformation into a regiment (1997–2005) ===
In 1997, the brigade was reformed into the 56th Guards Airborne Assault, Order of the Patriotic War 1st Class, Don Cossack Regiment, which became part of the 20th Guards Motor Rifle Division.

In July 1998, by order of the Minister of Defense of the Russian Federation, in connection with the resumption of construction of the Rostov Nuclear Power Plant, the 56th Regiment began redeployment to the city of Kamyshin in the Volgograd Region. The regiment was housed in the buildings of the Kamyshin Higher Military Construction Command and Engineering School, which was disbanded in 1998.

On August 19, 1999, an airborne assault detachment from the regiment was sent to reinforce the combined regiment 20th Guards Motor Rifle Division and was sent by a special military echelon to the Republic of Dagestan. On August 20, 1999, the airborne assault detachment arrived in the village of Botlikh. It subsequently took part in combat operations in the Chechen Republic.

In December 1999, units of the airborne battalion of the 56th Guards Regiment were the first to land on the Russian-Georgian border, blocking the Itum-Kali – Shatili road and subsequently, together with the airborne assault maneuver group FPS, covered the Chechen section of the border. In March 2000, the regiment's battalion took part in the assault on the village of Komsomolskoye. The regiment's battalion tactical group fought in the North Caucasus (temporary deployment location – Khankala settlement) until 2005.

=== Reorganization into a brigade (2009–2020) ===
After being withdrawn from Chechnya in November 2005, the regiment once again became a brigade. Since May 1, 2009, the 56th Guards Airborne Assault Regiment was reorganized ad 56th Separate Guards Airborne Assault Order of the Patriotic War Don Cossack Brigade (military unit 74507).

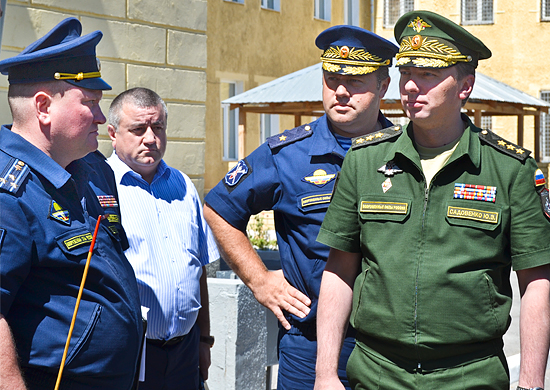
Deputy Minister of Defense of the Russian Federation Colonel General Yuriy Sadovenko visiting the 56th Guards Airborne Assault Brigade, 2014.

In accordance with the decree of the President of the Russian Federation No. 776 of October 11, 2013 and the directive of the Chief of the General Staff of the Armed Forces of the Russian Federation and reform of the Russian Airborne Forces, all airborne assault formations have been removed from the Ground Forces and subordinated to the Airborne Forces Directorate under the Russian Ministry of Defense. Since 2013, the 56th Guards Airborne Assault Brigade has been part of the Airborne Forces of the Russian Federation.

In January 2016, VDV commander General Colonel Vladimir Shamanov announced that a new range near Kamyshin would be built in the spring of that year due to the higher intensity of combat training. Since 2016, the unit has been replacing military equipment with UAZ Hunter vehicles to increase movement speed. Despite the positive result in terms of mobility, the brigade gave up the "hunters" due to their small size: the fighters were cramped, it was inconvenient to transport heavy weapons, additional equipment and cargo, so the brigade had to be equipped with GAZ-66 trucks.

There are no reliable facts (confirmed by the Russian side) about the participation of servicemen of the 56th Air Assault Brigade in the operation in Syria. From open sources, at least one officer – Major Sanal Sanchirov – died in December 2016 during the battles for Palmyra.

=== Russian invasion of Ukraine and reforms (2021–present) ===
Exercise of the 56th Guards Air Assault Brigade at the Danilovsky training ground to capture an airfield the main forces by landing, 18 February 2021.

Since 1 December 2021, the brigade has been reorganized into the 56th Guards Airborne Assault Order of the Patriotic War Don Cossack Regiment with a deployment in the city of Feodosia, Republic of Crimea. Two dormitories, a headquarters building, a canteen, a checkpoint, a checkpoint, a technical point, a site for weapons and military equipment, and the Starokrymsky training ground have been built at the new deployment location.

In 2021 it was indicated that the brigade would be redeployed to Crimea and reformed as a regiment. In mid-2021 it relocated from Kamyshin in Volgograd Oblast, Russia to Feodosia in Crimea. These circumstances explain a lot of the poor facilities, chaos, and undermanning described in Pavel Filatyev's memoir text. In November, 2021 it was confirmed that the new regiment would become a component of the 7th Guards Mountain Air Assault Division effective as of December 2021.

In 2022, the regiment, as part of the 7th Guards Mountain Air Assault Division of the Russian Armed Forces, took part in the war with Ukraine. The unit began its military operations from the territory of Crimea. Specifically, the regiment participated in the capture of Kherson by the Russian army, and in the capture of the airport in Chernobaevka, where it suffered serious losses. After retreating from Kherson, the 56th Airborne Assault Regiment occupied positions on the left bank of the Dnieper, then part of the units, in August 2023, were transferred to the Zaporizhia Oblast, to the Tokmak direction, in the village of Robotyne.

After the losses suffered, the units of the 56th Airborne Assault Regiment were supplemented with prisoners from places of detention. In September 2023, the regiment was deployed at the Southern theatre around the village of Verbove where it successfully defeated the Ukrainian forces during their counteroffensive. On April 29, 2024, Minister of Defense Sergey Shoigu sent a telegram to the regiment, in which he congratulated it on being awarded the Order of Kutuzov for its military actions in the war.

== Component units ==
=== Structure in 2021 ===
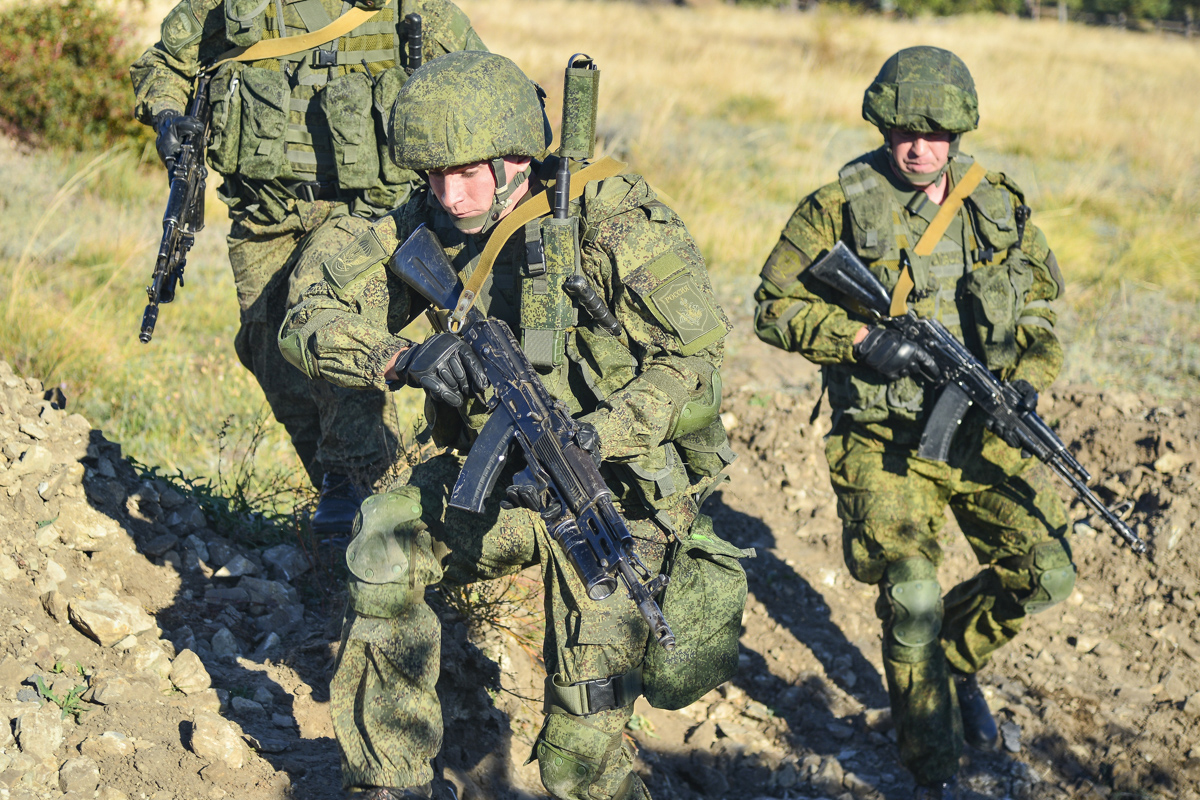
Members of the 56th Guards Air Assault Brigade of the Russian Airborne Forces (2018).

- 1st Air assault battalion
- 2nd Air assault battalion
- 3rd Air assault battalion
- Tank battalion
- Reconnaissance battalion
- Artillery battalion
- Anti-aircraft battery
- Anti-tank battery
- Rifle (sniper) company
- Electronic warfare company
- Signals company
- Engineer company
- Landing support company
- Medical company
- Maintenance company
- Material support company
- RCB company
- Brigade command company

== Commanders ==
- Alexander Petrovich Plokhikh (1980–1981)
- Mikhail Karpushkin (1981–1982)
- Viktor Arsentevich Sukhin (1982–1983)
- Viktor Matveevich Chizhikov (1983–1985)
- Vitaly Raevsky (1985–1987)
- Valery Evnevich (1987–1990)
- Alexander Sotnik (1990–1995)
- Sergei Mishanin (1995–1996)
- Rustam Aliev Stepanenko (1996–1997)
- Pavel Kirsi (2002–2007)
- Igor Timofeyev (2007–2012)
- Alexander Vitalievich Lebedev (2012–2014)
- Alexander Valitov (August 2014 – March 2018)
- Colonel Yevgeny Nikolayevich Tonkikh (March 2018 – March 2020)
- Colonel Andrey Kondrashkin (March 2020–2022)

== Heroes of USSR/Russia ==
- Sergey Kozlov — deputy commander of the parachute-landing company, Hero of the Soviet Union
- Sergey Petrov — commander of the reconnaissance company, Hero of the Russian Federation
- Yuri Vornovskoy — junior sergeant of the reconnaissance company, Hero of the Russian Federation
- Taimuraz Yesenov — private of the sapper company, Hero of the Russian Federation
- Ilyas Mukhamedeev — sergeant, Hero of the Russian Federation
- Ilya Sponyakov — senior lieutenant, Hero of the Russian Federation
