= Chuchkovo, Vologda Oblast =

Chuchkovo Чучково
- Village
- Location within Vologda Oblast Location within Russia
- Coordinates: 59°35′N 41°14′E
- Country: Russia
- Region: Vologda Oblast
- District: Sokolsky District
- Time zone: UTC+3:00

Chuchkovo (Russian: Чучково) is a rural locality (a village) and the administrative center of Chuchkovskoye Rural Settlement, Sokolsky District, Vologda Oblast, Russia. The population was 307 as of 2002. There are 6 streets.

== Geography ==
Chuchkovo is located 88 km northeast of Sokol (the district's administrative centre) by road. Slobodishchevo is the nearest rural locality.
