= Aral-Paygambar =

Aral Paygambar
Payg'ambar Orol
- Location within Uzbekistan

Geography
- Location: Amu Darya river
- Coordinates: 37.2904°N 67.1526°E
- Area: 3,094 ha (7,650 acres)

Administration
- Uzbekistan

Demographics
- Population: 0 (2024)

Aral-Paygambar (Uzbek: Payg'ambar Orol; Russian: Арал-Пайгамбар), which means the island of the prophet, is an island on the Amu Darya river which separates Uzbekistan and Afghanistan. The nature reserve was created in 1960 on the island of Aral-Paygambar on the Amu Darya river near Termez. The island has 3.1 thousands hectares for conservation of riparian forests and the unique population of Bukhara deer. In all there are 150 species of plants, 21 species of mammals, 143 species of birds, 25 species of reptiles, and c. 35 species of fish. Many rare and endangered species, including large and small Amu Darya shovelnose, golden eagles, black storks, jungle cat, dressing, Asian otters, etc. In recent years, due to the reduction of floods and expansion households. activity in the floodplain degradation the national complex.

It is also a military zone due to its proximity to Afghanistan. There is a mausoleum of the Islamic and Biblical prophet Zul-Kifl. The prophet Zul-Kifl is mentioned in the Quran as Dhul-Kifl and the Old Testament as Ezekiel. According to the legend, the prophet had ordered to let his dead body go in a boat and to bury him at a place where the boat would pull in to the shore. But the boat stopped in the middle of the Amu Darya river, near Termez. At this spot an island quickly rose where his body was buried thereafter. The mausoleum was built in the 11th and 12th centuries, and consists of a mosque with its adjoining premises, a burial vault and two commemoration rooms.
