= Operation Magistral =

1987 Soviet operation in the Soviet-Afghan War

Coordinates: 33.6000°N 69.5000°E

- Part of the Soviet–Afghan War
Date	19 November 1987 – 10 January 1988
Location	Paktia Province, Afghanistan
Result	DRA–Soviet victory

Belligerents
Soviet Union; Afghanistan	Haqqani network Pakistan

Commanders and leaders
(Soviet Union) Boris Gromov (Afghanistan) Shahnawaz Tanai	Jalaluddin Haqqani

Units involved
(Soviet Union) 40th Army; 108th Motor Rifle Division; 201st Motor Rifle Division; 103rd Guards Airborne Division; 56th Air Assault Brigade; 345th Airborne Regiment; Afghan Army; 8th Infantry Division; 11th Infantry Division; 12th Infantry Division; 14th Infantry Division; 25th Infantry Division; 15th Tank Brigade; Afghan Commando Forces; KHAD-e-Nezami; 212th Special Purpose Battalion	Unknown

Strength
(Soviet Union) 20,000 (Afghanistan) 8,000	9,000–20,000; 10 MRLs

Casualties and losses
(Soviet Union) 24 killed 56 wounded (Afghanistan) 300 killed 700 wounded	300+ killed

Operation Magistral (Russian: Операция «Магистраль») was a Soviet Army military operation during the Soviet–Afghan War that began in late November 1987 and ended in early January 1988.

== Background ==
The operation was launched to open the road - hence its name, from the Russian word for magistral road (highway) - from Gardez to Khost that had been blocked by Mujahideen forces and a local tribe for several months, in order to deliver supplies to the population and Afghan government troops in the besieged city on the Afghan–Pakistani border.

The offensive was carried out by the 108th Motor Rifle Division and 201st Motor Rifle Division of the Soviet 40th Army, the 103rd Guards Airborne Division, the 345th Airborne Regiment and the 56th Airborne Brigade, and several Spetsnaz units. The Democratic Republic of Afghanistan provided troops from its 8th, 11th, 12th, 14th and 25th infantry divisions and from the 15th Tank Brigade. The DRA forces were commanded by Major-General Shahnawaz Tanai.

The ground offensive began after weeks of failed negotiations with the Jadran tribe and Mujahideen commander Jalaluddin Haqqani, who had numerous bases in the region and hoped that Khost would eventually fall into their hands which would allow them to proclaim the first territorial stronghold in Afghanistan independent of the pro-Kremlin regime in Kabul.

Special units of the 40th Army conducted a massive propaganda campaign using radio broadcasts and distributing thousands of leaflets, calling on the Jadran tribe to retreat and the local population to leave the area.

== Operation ==
The initial phase of the operation began on 19 November with an offensive carried out principally by Afghan troops, in order to clear the plains around Gardez, before moving into mountainous areas. By 28 November, they had cleared Ghalgai, Dara, and Saruti Kandau at the base of the Shabak Khel valley, while a flanking force made its way into the Kanai valley. On 30 November, a force of 900 Afghan commandos were airlifted into Shabak Khel valley. Heavy fighting also broke out in the neighbouring Kanai valley where DRA troops advanced slowly but surely, building defensive outposts as they went, and suffering from punishing Mujahideen counter-attacks that inflicted heavy losses.

=== Capture of the Sata-Kandow Pass ===
The Sata-Kandow Pass, 30 km east of Gardez, was the main passage between Kabul and Khost. Here the Mujahideen placed their main blocking position, concentrating their forces and digging in anti-aircraft guns and other heavy weapons. To defend the approaches of Sata-Kandow, the Mujahideen deployed ten BM-12 multiple rocket launchers, and placed ZGU-1 anti-aircraft guns on every height. They had a plentiful supply of DShK machine guns, 75 and 82 mm recoilless rifles, and RPG-7 anti-tank rocket launchers. They also mined the opening of the pass to a depth of three kilometers, boasting that their position was impregnable.

Following the failure of the negotiations, an attack was launched on 28 November. In order to discover the enemy positions, Soviet Colonel General Boris Gromov ordered that dummy paratroopers be dropped near the pass. When the Mujahideen opened fire, Soviet reconnaissance aircraft were able to pinpoint their positions and direct airstrikes against them. This was followed by a four-hour artillery barrage.

The first ground attack was carried out on 29 November by a motorised rifle regiment. The attack quickly bogged down under heavy fire and Mujahideen counter-attacks, and the Soviet force withdrew after suffering severe casualties.

On Gromov's orders, a new attack was launched on 1 December this time with an Airborne battalion and a battalion of the Afghan Commando Forces. These units succeeded in capturing the high ground above the pass. The Mujahideen, threatened with encirclement, beat a hasty retreat, abandoning most of their heavy weapons and equipment.

=== Relief of Khost ===
The Soviet forces then launched several airborne attacks, though they were limited in this by the Mujahideen use of Stinger missiles. In a night attack, an airborne brigade was flown in by helicopters to capture Mirujan, at the southern end of the mountains on the Gardez-Khost road. Simultaneously, another brigade was airlifted into Khost and staged a breakout to rejoin the main force.

The Mujahideen, having lost control of the pass, realised that a conventional defence would only entail more losses for them, and they withdrew their main units from the path of the Soviet offensive. Beforehand, they laid mines on the road, and maintained a constant long-range fire with 107 mm rockets. They also sprang ambushes on Soviet units that ventured too far from the main force. In one such ambush, 24 Soviet paratroopers were killed.

Despite this, the Soviet armoured columns made a slow but regular progress, entering Khost on 30 December. Soviet and DRA outposts were maintained to keep the Gardez-Khost road open, but were withdrawn at the end of January.

== Aftermath ==
Operation Magistral was a success for the Soviet army, but occurred too late in the war to have any lasting effect. When the main Soviet force had withdrawn, Mujahideen groups cut off Khost once again, as they had done since 1981.

In April 1988, by signing the Geneva Accords the Soviet Union became committed to withdrawing its forces from Afghanistan.

== See also ==
- Spillover of Soviet - Afghan war in Pakistan

=== Cultural depictions ===
Some of the events of the operation were used for the plot of the film The 9th Company. The Truth About 9th Company documentary computer game is dedicated to the Battle for Hill 3234, which occurred during Operation Magistral.
