= 105th Guards Vienna Airborne Division =

Airborne division of the Soviet Airborne Troops

12th Guards Airborne Division (December 1943 – 18 December 1944) 105th Guards Rifle Division (18 December 1944 – 7 June 1946) 105th Guards Airborne Division (7 June 1946 – 1979; 1990 – 1994)
- Active: 1943–1979; 1990–1994
- Country: Soviet Union (until 1992); Uzbekistan (1992–1994)
- Branch: Soviet Army; Uzbek Ground Forces
- Type: Airborne forces
- Size: Division
- Engagements: World War II: Vienna Offensive; Prague Offensive
- Decorations: Order of the Red Banner
- Battle honours: Vienna

The 105th Guards Airborne Division (Russian: 105-я гвардейская воздушно-десантная Венская дивизия) was an airborne forces division unit of the Soviet Airborne Troops.

The division was originally formed as the 12th Guards Airborne Division as part of the 38th Guards Airborne Corps in December 1943. In December 1944, it became the 105th Guards Rifle Division of the 9th Guards Army. On 7 June 1946, the 105th Guards Airborne division was formed from the 105th Guards Rifle Division. Disbanded in 1979, the division was reactivated in 1990. It was taken over by Uzbekistan in 1992, while still not yet fully formed. The division was dissolved in 1994 and became the 17th Air Assault Brigade.

== History ==
=== Second World War ===
The 12th Guards Airborne Division was formed on 23 December 1943 from three Guards Airborne Brigades as part of the 38th Guards Airborne Corps. However, some Soviet accounts state that it began formation months later in March 1944. The division's first commander was Mikhail Denisenko, who had commanded the 202nd Airborne Brigade before the war. It was held in reserve in Belarus until December 1944. On 18 December 1944, it became the 105th Guards Rifle Division in Maryina Horka. On 5 January 1945, it was assigned to the 38th Guards Rifle Corps. From 21 January to 20 February, it was transported to Szolnok, where the corps became part of the 9th Guards Army. On 30 March, the division crossed the Rába. The division advanced into Austria and captured Pressbaum on 6 April. During the Vienna Offensive, the 105th Guards blocked the Vienna-Linz road, cutting Vienna off from German reinforcements and allowing other Soviet troops to capture the city. Along with other units, the division caused severe losses among the 3rd SS Panzer Division Totenkopf, the 2nd SS Panzer Division Das Reich, and the Hungarian 2nd Armored Division and 9th Infantry Division of the Third Army. On 26 April, the division was awarded the Order of the Red Banner. On 5 May, the division marched into Czechoslovakia and captured Znojmo on 9 May. On 12 May, the division met American troops on the Vltava near the village of Tsisek.

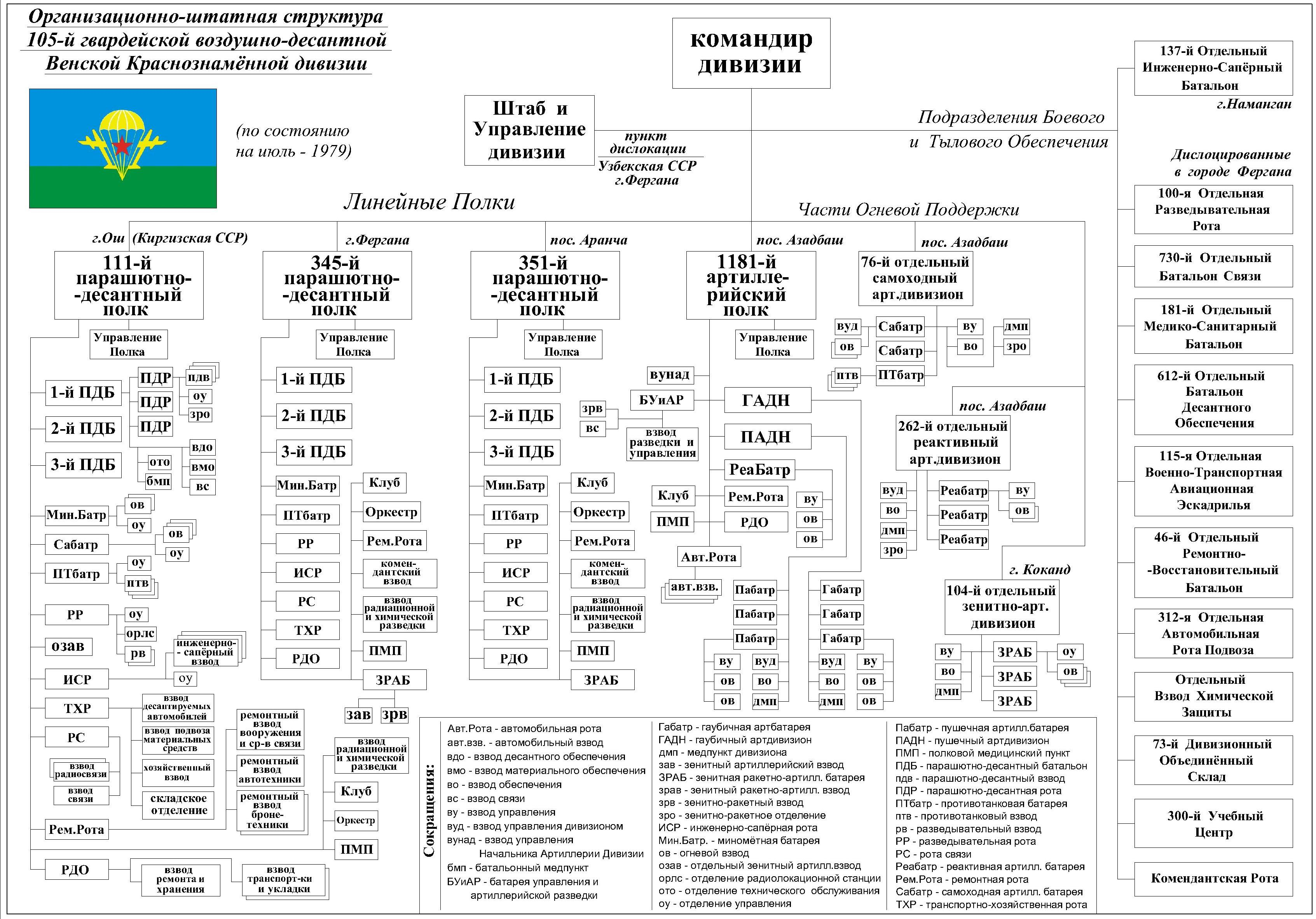
Divisional organization in 1979

=== Post-war ===
The division was awarded the title "Vienna" on 17 May. From 7 June to 5 July, the division was transported east to points northeast of Budapest, where it became part of the Central Group of Forces. From 16 January 1946 to 16 February, the division was redeployed to Teykovo in the Ivanovo Oblast. On 7 June, it was renamed as the 105th Guards Airborne Division. In 1960, the division, without the 331st Guards Airborne Regiment, was relocated to Fergana in the Turkestan Military District. The 351st Guards Airborne Regiment was added to the division from the 106th Guards Airborne Division.

In accordance with a directive of the General Staff, from August 3, 1979, to December 1, 1979, the 105th Guards Airborne Division was disbanded. From the division remained in the city of Fergana the 345th Independent Guards Airborne Regiment (much stronger than the usual regimental size) with the separate 115th military-transport aviation squadron. The rest of the personnel of the division were reassigned to fill out other incomplete airborne units and formations and to the newly formed air assault brigades. Based on the division's 351st Guards Parachute Regiment, the 56th Guards Air Assault Brigade was formed in Azadbash, Chirchik district, Tashkent Oblast, Uzbek SSR. Meanwhile, the 111th Guards Parachute Regiment became the 35th Separate Guards Air Assault Brigade.

=== Service in independent Uzbekistan ===
In 1990, the division was again reactivated, but it was not complete on the breakup of the Soviet Union. In connection with the transition of the Armed Forces of Uzbekistan to a brigade structure by 1994, the management of the 105th division was reorganized under the 2nd Army Corps of the Armed Forces of the Republic of Uzbekistan. On the basis of the 387th Regiment, the 4th Airborne Brigade was formed. Later, the brigade became the 17th Air Assault Brigade of the Uzbekistan Ground Forces.

The unit took part in the Andijan massacre, being led by Colonel Pavel Ergashev.

== Commanders ==
- Major general Mikhail Denisenko (21 February 1945 – 5 November 1945)
- Major general Vasily Sokolovsky (1946–1951)
- Major general Sergey Guzenko (1951–1956)
- Major general Mikhail Simonov (1956–1962)
- Major general Mikhail Verbovikov (1962–1967)
- Major general Pavel Kalinin (1967–1970)
- Major general Anatoliy Dobrovolskiy (1970–1972)
- Major general Vladlen Kolesov (1972–1975)
- Major general Yuriy Kuznetsov (1975–1977)
- Major general Pavel Korolyov (1977–1979)
- Major general Gennadiy Borisov (1991–1992)

== Composition ==
=== 105th Guards Rifle Division ===
- 1945
  - 331st Guards Rifle Regiment
  - 345th Guards Rifle Regiment
  - 349th Guards Rifle Regiment
  - 56th Guards Divisional Artillery Brigade

=== 105th Guards Airborne Division ===
- 1947
  - 331st Guards Airborne Regiment
  - 345th Guards Airlanding Regiment
  - 165th Guards Airborne Artillery Regiment
- 1979
  - 111th Guards Airborne Regiment
  - 345th Independent Guards Airborne Regiment
  - 351st Guards Airborne Regiment
