= 70th Separate Guards Motor Rifle Brigade =

70th Separate Guards Motor Rifle Brigade First Formation
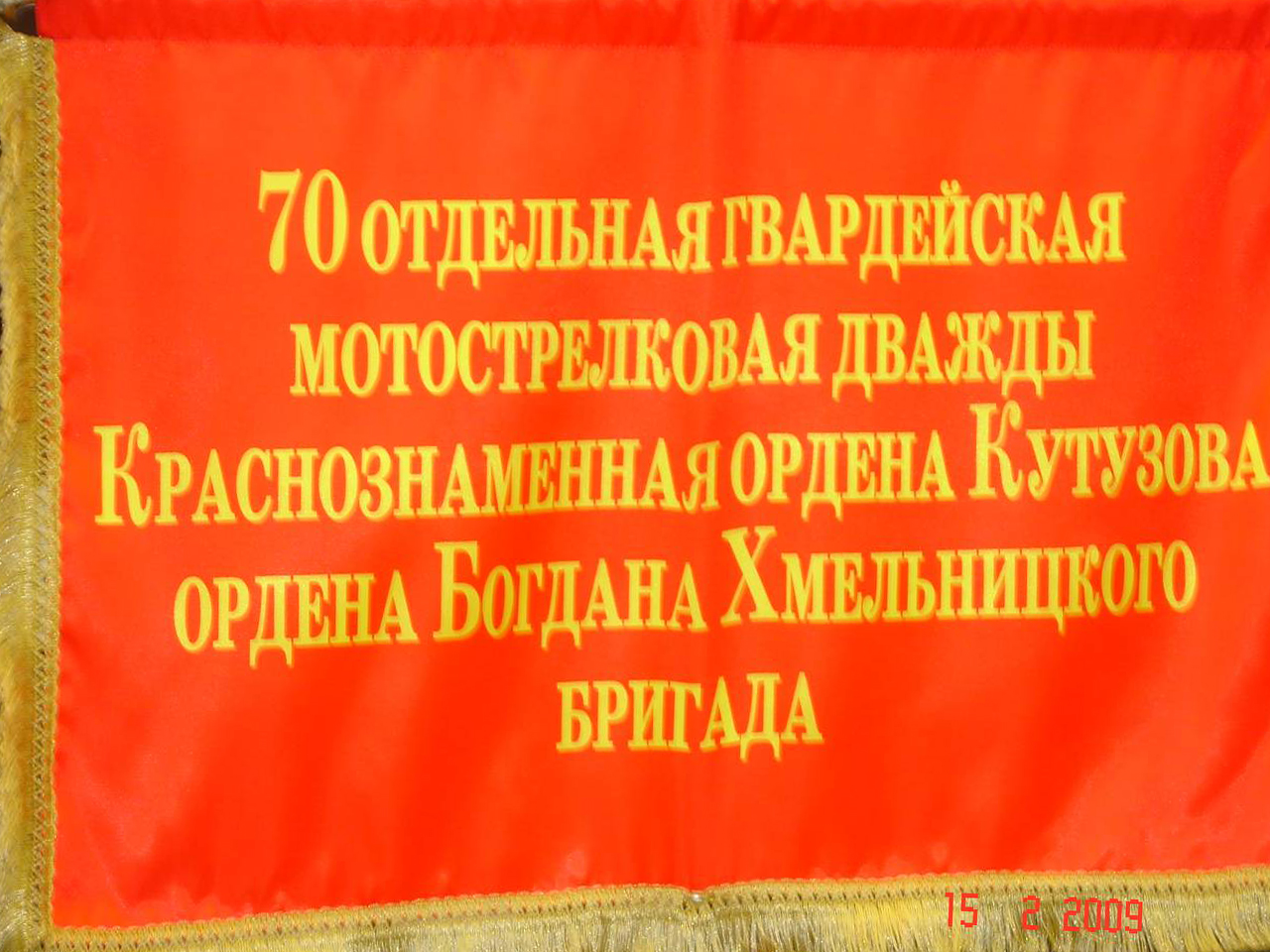
- Brigade battle flag
- Active: 1979–1989
- Country: Soviet Union
- Branch: Soviet Army
- Type: Motorized infantry
- Garrison/HQ: Kandahar
- Engagements: Soviet–Afghan War
- Decorations: Order of the Red Banner (2); Order of Kutuzov 2nd class; Order of Bogdan Khmelnitsky 2nd class

The 70th Separate Guards Motor Rifle Brigade was a Soviet Ground Forces mechanized infantry brigade of the Soviet–Afghan War. During the war, it was based in Kandahar.

== First Formation ==
The brigade was formed on 1 March 1980 in Kandahar from the 373rd Guards Motor Rifle Regiment of the 5th Guards Motor Rifle Division. On 4 May 1985, it was awarded a second Order of the Red Banner for its actions in Afghanistan. In August 1988, it withdrew to Kushka. The brigade was disbanded in February 1989.

== Second Formation ==
The 17th Guards Rifle Division became the 123rd Guards Motor Rifle Division in 1957 and converted into the 129th Guards Machine-Gun Artillery Division in 1989. With the collapse of the Soviet Union, it became a Russian Ground Forces formation in May 1992. In 2001, it was converted to the 17th Guards Motor Rifle Division, and became the 70th Guards Motor Rifle Brigade in 2009. The brigade is currently based in Ussuriysk.
