= Chuchkovsky District =

Chuchkovsky District Чучковский район (Russian)
- District
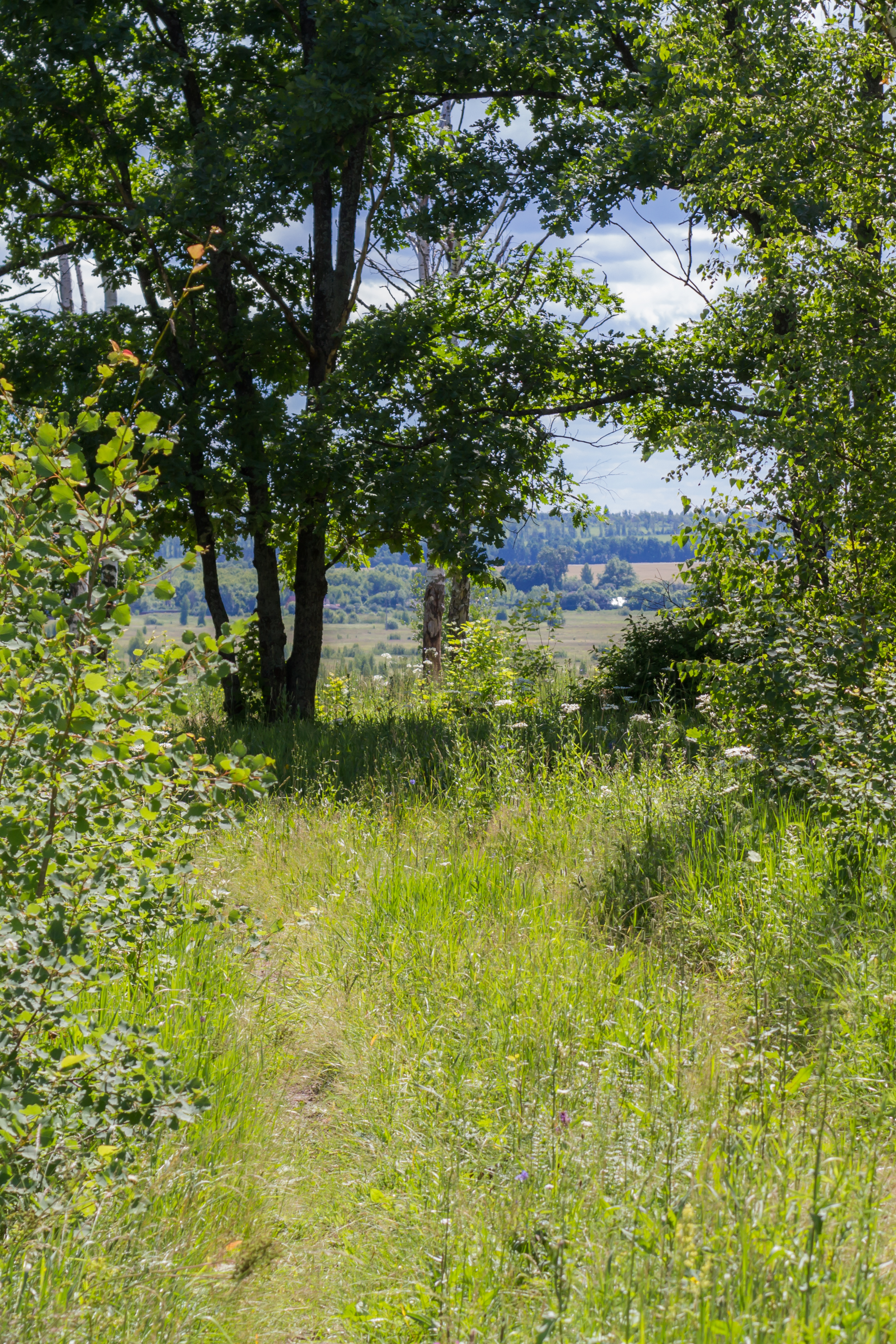
- Landscape in Chuchkovsky District

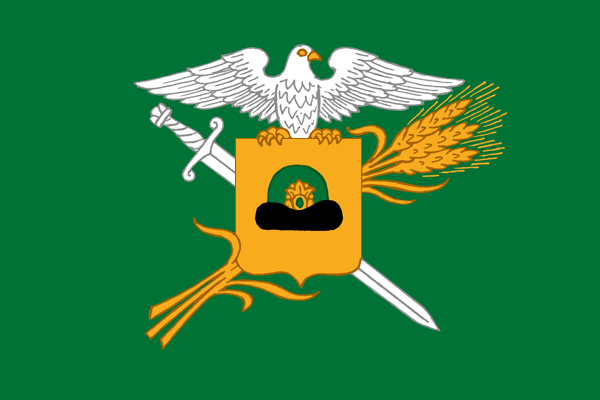
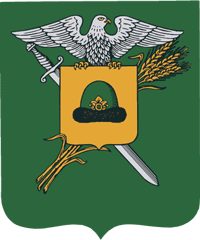
- Flag Coat of arms
- Location of Chuchkovsky District in Ryazan Oblast
- Coordinates: 54°15′N 41°27′E
- Country: Russia
- Federal subject: Ryazan Oblast
- Administrative center: Chuchkovo

Area
  - Total: 896 km^{2} (346 sq mi)

Population (2010 Census)
  - Total: 8,700
  - Density: 9.7/km^{2} (25/sq mi)
  - Urban: 35.9%
  - Rural: 64.1%

Administrative structure
  - Administrative divisions: 1 Work settlements, 12 Rural okrugs
  - Inhabited localities: 1 urban-type settlements, 65 rural localities

Municipal structure
  - Municipally incorporated as: Chuchkovsky Municipal District
  - Municipal divisions: 1 urban settlements, 5 rural settlements
- Time zone: UTC+3 (MSK)
- OKTMO ID: 61653000
- Website: http://www.adm-chuchkovo.ru/

Chuchkovsky District (Russian: Чу́чковский райо́н) is an administrative and municipal district (raion), one of the twenty-five in Ryazan Oblast, Russia. It is located in the eastern central part of the oblast. The area of the district is 896 square kilometers (346 sq mi). Its administrative center is the urban locality (a work settlement) of Chuchkovo. Population: 8,700 (2010 Census); 11,244 (2002 census); 12,294 (1989 Soviet census). The population of Chuchkovo accounts for 35.9% of the district's total population.

== Notable residents ==
- Viktor Ivankov (1924–2021), Soviet military officer, born in Antonovo
