= Chuchkovo, Ryazan Oblast =

Chuchkovo Чучково
- Urban-type settlement
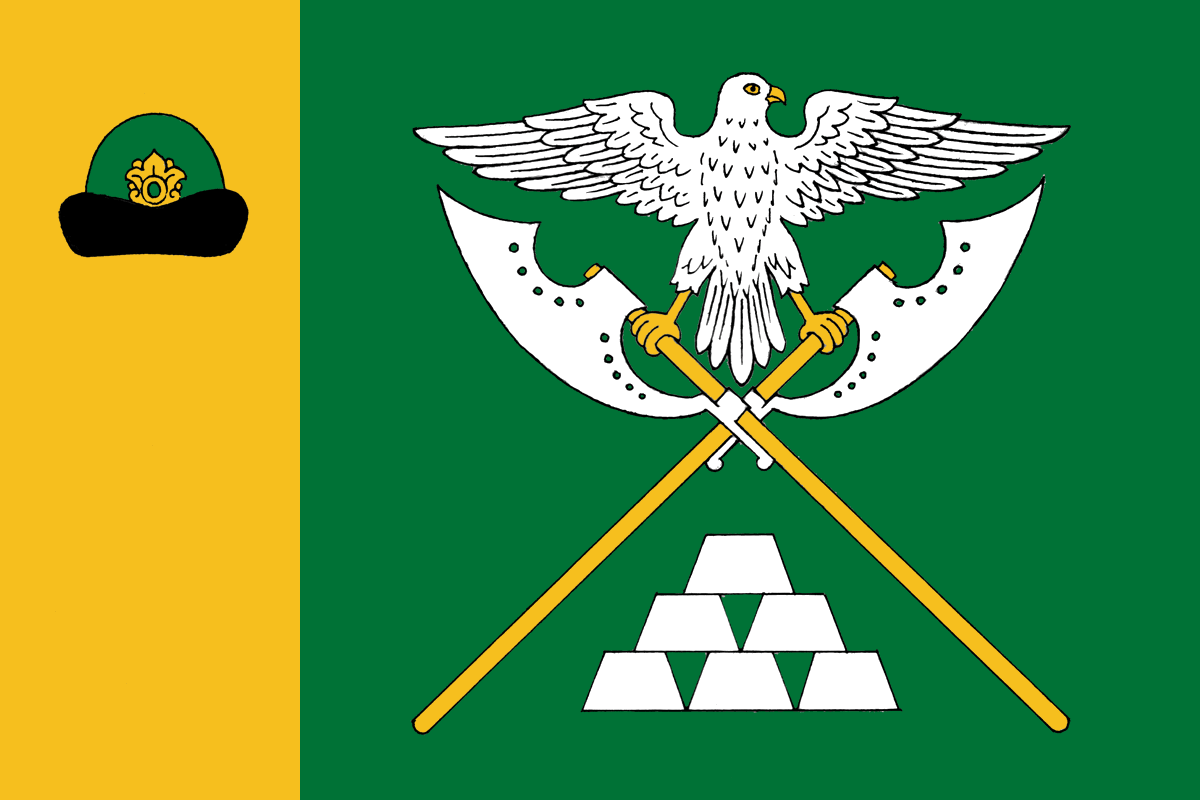
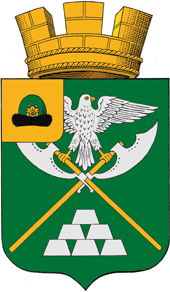
- Flag Coat of arms
- Interactive map of Chuchkovo
- Location of Chuchkovo Chuchkovo (Ryazan Oblast)
- Coordinates: 54.2695°N 41.4515°E
- Country: Russia
- Federal subject: Ryazan Oblast
- Administrative district: Chuchkovsky District

Population (2010 Census)
  - Total: 3,122
  - Estimate (2023): 2,565 (−17.8%)
- Time zone: UTC+3 (MSK)
- Postal code: 391420
- OKTMO ID: 61653151051

Chuchkovo (Russian: Чучково) is an urban locality (an urban-type settlement) in Chuchkovsky District of Ryazan Oblast, Russia. Population: 3,122 (2010 census); 4,517 (2002 census); 3,795 (1989 Soviet census).
