= 345th Independent Guards Airborne Regiment =

Soviet and Russian Airborne Troops unit

345th Guards Air Assault Red Banner Order of Suvorov Regiment named after Hero of the Soviet Union Colonel General V. A. Vostrotin
- 345-й гвардейский десантно-штурмовой Краснознаменный ордена Суворова полк имени Героя Советского Союза генерал-полковника В. А. Востротина
- 345th Guards Air Assault Regiment motto & emblem
- Active: 30 December 1944 – 1 May 1998; 14 November 2023 – present
- Country: Soviet Union (until 1991); Russian Federation (1991 – 1998; 2023 – present)
- Branch: Soviet Armed Forces: Soviet Airborne Forces; Russian Armed Forces: Russian Airborne Forces
- Type: Airborne forces
- Role: Light Infantry; Airborne Infantry; Airmobile infantry
- Size: Regiment
- Part of: 104th Guards Air Assault Division; Southern Military District
- Garrison/HQ: Kostroma, Fergana, Uzbek SSR (1960 – December 1979), Bagram, Afghanistan (December 1979 – February 1989), Kirovabad, Azerbaijan SSR (February 1989 – August 1992), Gudauta, Abkhazia (August 1992 – May 1998), Ulyanovsk (2023 – present); MUN 73612
- Patron: St. Elijah the Prophet
- Mottos: Сила и честь! (Strength and honour!)
- Anniversaries: 30 December
- Engagements: World War II; Vienna Offensive; Soviet–Afghan War; Operation Storm-333; Operation Magistral; Battle for Hill 3234; War in Abkhazia; Russian invasion of Ukraine; Dnieper campaign (2022–present)
- Decorations: Order of the Red Banner; Order of Suvorov, 2nd class
- Battle honours: Guards

Commanders
- Current commander: Guards Colonel P. P. Popov
- Notable commanders: Valery Vostrotin

The 345th Guards Air Assault Red Banner Order of Suvorov Regiment (Russian: 345-й гвардейский десантно-штурмовой Краснознаменный ордена Суворова полк; MUN 33702) is a unit of the Russian Airborne Forces (VDV) and regiment of the 104th Guards Air Assault Division. Before 1992, it was part of the Soviet Airborne Forces. After the collapse of the Soviet Union, it was active in the Russian Armed Forces until 1998, when it was disbanded. The regiment was restored by a decision of the Russian Ministry of Defense in 2023.

== History ==
=== World War II and Afghanistan (1944–1989) ===
It was formed on 30 December 1944 at Lapichi, Osipovichi district, Mogilev Oblast, in the Byelorussian SSR. In July 1946, the Guards Airborne Landing Regiment was redeployed to the city of Kostroma, and in 1960 to the city of Fergana, where it remained until December 1979.

The regiment was part of the 105th Guards Airborne Division in the city of Fergana of the Uzbek SSR. For the high level of combat training and active actions demonstrated during the Vostok-72 exercises, the regiment was awarded the pennant of the USSR Minister of Defense "For courage and military valor". In 1979, after the disbandment of 105th Guards Vienna Airborne Division it received a Separate Regiment designation (345th OPPD).

The regiment was attached to 40th Army headquartered in Kabul, serving in Afghanistan from the earliest days of the conflict, arriving on 14 December 1979. The Regiment was based in Bagram Airfield, Bagram (its 2nd Battalion in (Bamian), and later – Anab). During the Regiment's deployment in Afghanistan, its original 1st Battalion remained on station in Fergana, Uzbek SSR, and in 1982 became the base for formation of the 387th Training Regiment.

An Airborne Battalion, which arrived in Afghanistan in July 1979 under the command of Guards Lieutenant Colonel Lomakin, was integrated into the 345th regiment as its new 1st Battalion. In October 1979, an incident resulting in death of KGB officer Captain Chepurnoy had occurred in this battalion, leading to transfer of command to Guards Major Pustovit.

87 troops of a company of the 345th Regiment took part in Operation Storm-333. The 345th Airborne Regiment had participated in most major operations of the conflict, including the Battle for Hill 3234, which became the basis for the script of the film The 9th Company. On or about 11 February 1989 the regiment withdrew from Afghanistan making it one of the last detachments to exit the country.

=== After Afghanistan (1989–1998) ===
After the withdrawal from Afghanistan, the regiment became part of 104th Guards Airborne Division. The Regiment was later relocated to Gudauta in the Abkhaz ASSR of the Georgian SSR. It took part in the April 9, 1989, crack-down on demonstrators in the centre of Tbilisi. Since August 1992 it was stationed in Gudauta Abkhaz ASSR to participate in the Abkhaz war. It was subsequently renamed the 50th Military Base and then the 10th Peacekeeping Airborne Regiment. In 1998, the 345th Independent Guards Airborne Regiment was dissolved by the Ministry of Defense of the Russian Federation.

=== Restoration (2023–present) ===
In 2023, the 345th Guards Air Assault Regiment was formed as part of the 104th Guards Air Assault Division in Ulyanovsk, under the leadership of Guards Colonel P. P. Popov.

On 24 June 2024, by decree of the President of the Russian Federation, the 345th Guards Air Assault Regiment was awarded the honorary name: named after the Hero of the Soviet Union, Colonel General Valery Aleksandrovich Vostrotin. Additionally, on 9 December 2024, the regiment was presented with the Battle Banner.

Since 2024, the regiment is taking part in military operations on the territory of the Kherson region during the Russian invasion of Ukraine.
