= Onoprienko =

Onoprienko (Ukrainian: Онопрієнко, Russian: Оноприе́нко) is a Ukrainian surname.

== Notable people ==
Notable people who have this surname include:

- Alexander Onoprienko, Russian Major-General
- Anatoly Onoprienko (1959–2013), prolific Ukrainian serial killer and mass murderer
- Ekaterina Onoprienko, Russian winner of several Olympic medals
- Glen Onoprienko, Queensland state candidate
- Igor Onoprienko, Ukrainian mixed martial artist
- Nikolai Nikolayevich Onoprienko (1911–1979), Soviet Army Colonel of World War II and Hero of the Soviet Union
- Nikolai Markovich Onoprienko, Russian Guard Senior Lieutenant
- Oleksandr Onoprienko, Ukrainian governor
- Philip Petrovich Onoprienko, Soviet colonel decorated in the Order of the Red Star
- Yuri Onoprienko, Russian chairman of the Legislative Duma of Khabarovsk Krai
- Valentin Onoprienko, Soviet and Ukrainian historian of science, professor
- Viktoriia Onopriienko, Ukrainian rhythmic gymnast
- Yevgeny Onopriyenko, Russian footballer
- Zinaida Onoprienko, Ukrainian race walker
