= Nemkov =

Nemkov (masculine, Russian: Немков) or Nemkova (feminine, Russian: Немкова) is a Russian surname. Notable people with the surname include:

- Aleksey Nemkov (1919–1972), Soviet soldier
- Vadim Nemkov (born 1992), Russian mixed martial artist, brother of Viktor
- Viktor Nemkov (born 1987), Russian mixed martial artist, brother of Vadim
