= Vladimir Vladimirov =

Vladimir Vladimirov may be:

- Vladimir Vladimirov (footballer), Bulgarian footballer, born 1986
- Vladimir Fedorovich Vladimirov, 1914-1943, Russian soldier
- Vladimir Vladimirov (politician), Russian official
