= 1st Airborne Corps (Soviet Union) =

Airborne corps of the Red Army during World War II

- Active: 1941–1942
- Country: Soviet Union
- Branch: Soviet airborne
- Type: Airborne
- Size: Corps
- Engagements: World War II: Battle of Kiev; Battle of Moscow

Commanders
- Notable commanders: Viktor Zholudev

The 1st Airborne Corps was an airborne corps of the Red Army during World War II. It fought in the Battle of Kiev, the Battle of Moscow and in the Battle of Demyansk.

== History ==
The 1st Airborne Corps was formed in April 1941 from the 1st, 204th and 211th Airborne Brigades in the Kiev Special Military District, commanded by Major General Matvei Usenko. It was temporarily moved to Odessa Military District in preparation for a possible invasion of Romania but moved back to Kiev within a short period. After Operation Barbarossa, the corps fought to defend Kiev from the advancing Army Group South, along with the 5th Army and the 6th Army. After being reinforced by the 2nd and 3rd Airborne Corps, the corps fought in the Battle of Kiev. It was almost surrounded during the German encirclement of Kiev and was disbanded afterwards on 6 August.

The corps was reformed in early September and conducted training around Saratov. On 24 November, it was subordinated to Western Front High Command. On the next day, the corps left Saratov for new bases near Moscow in the vicinity of the Lyubertsy airfield. In December, it participated in airborne operations to disrupt German troops around Moscow. Between 16 and 17 February 1942, the 204th Airborne Brigade's 4th Battalion was airdropped in the Rzhev operation. During late February and early March, the corps fought around Demyansk. During the Demyansk fighting, the corps was sent behind German lines in an unsuccessful operation to capture airfields supplying the Demyansk Pocket, but suffered heavy losses with only 900 out of 8,500 men in the corps returning to Soviet lines. In August, the corps was converted into the 37th Guards Rifle Division and fought at Stalingrad.

The corps was reformed in fall 1942. On 8 December, its units were used to form two new guards airborne divisions. Its 1st, 204th, and 211th Airborne Brigades were used to form the 9th Guards Airborne Division. Its headquarters became a part of the 4th Guards Airborne Division.
