= Kuzma Grebennik =

Soviet Army lieutenant general (1900–1974)

Kuzma Yevdokimovich Grebennik
- Кузьма Евдокимович Гребенник
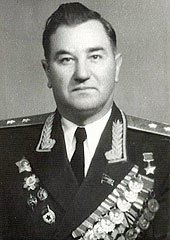
- Born: 18 February 1900; Bryansk Village, Slavyanoserbsk Uyezd, Ekaterinoslav Governorate, Russian Empire
- Died: 22 September 1974 (aged 74); Kiev, Ukrainian SSR, Soviet Union
- Burial place: Baikove Cemetery
- Military career
- Allegiance: Soviet Russia (1919-1922); Soviet Union (1922-1961)
- Branch: Border Troops; Red Army
- Service years: 1919–1961
- Rank: Lieutenant general
- Commands: 15th Rifle Division; 37th Guards Rifle Division; Border Troops Ukraine District; Border Troops Leningrad Military District; Border Troops Southwestern District
- Conflicts: Russian Civil War; World War II; Soviet–Japanese border conflicts; Battle of Lake Khasan; Great Patriotic War; Operation Kutuzov; Operation Bagration; East Prussian Offensive; Berlin Offensive; Ukrainian insurgency; Hungarian Revolution
- Awards: Hero of the Soviet Union; Order of Lenin (3); Order of the Red Banner (5); Order of Suvorov, 2nd class; Order of Kutuzov, 2nd class; Virtuti Militari Commander's Cross

Kuzma Yevdokimovich Grebennik (Russian: Кузьма Евдокимович Гребенник; 18 February 1900 – 22 September 1974) was a Red Army lieutenant general and Hero of the Soviet Union. Grebennik served in the Soviet Border Troops both before and after World War II. During World War II, he commanded the 15th and 37th Guards Rifle Divisions.

== Early life ==
Kuzma Grebennik was born on 18 February 1900 in the village of Bryansk in Slavyanoserbsk Uyezd in the Yekaterinoslav Governorate in a working-class family of Russian ethnicity. His father worked as a miner in the coal mines of the Donbas. Grebennik graduated from elementary school and became a sorter at the coal mine at the age of 10. In 1914, his family moved to the village of Kremen in Kharkov Governorate, where Grebennik graduated from a two-year college in 1915. In 1916, he became a worker at the Donets-Rubezhnyi Factory. Grebennik returned to the Donbas and became a worker at a coal mine in 1918.

In May 1919, Grebennik was drafted into the Red Army and served with the 42nd Rifle Division. He caught typhus and after recovery in January 1920 became a clerk at the Ekaterinoslav Governorate recruiting office. Grebennik joined the Communist Party of the Soviet Union in September. In October, he transferred to the Cheka and served in the Krasny Kommunistychesky Battalion of the Cheka Donetsk Division's 1st Regiment. With the regiment, Grebennik fought against the White Army commanded by Pyotr Nikolayevich Wrangel.

== Interwar ==
In April 1922, Grebennik became an instructor with the 455th Rogozhsko-Simonovsky Regiment of the 51st Rifle Division. He transferred to the border troops of the OGPU in October 1922 as a commissar of the Ochakovo Border battalion. Grebennik graduated from the Graduate School of the USSR Border Troops in 1924. In September, he became a platoon commander of the Odessa School of border troops regiment. He became the head of border troops at the Polish border and the motorized group of the Moldovan border detachment. In November 1929, he became the assistant chief of the drill for the 21st Yampolsky Border Detachment. Grebennik was appointed commander of the 5th Mechanized Regiment of the Order of Lenin Separate Mechanized Division of special purpose troops in December 1931. In July 1935, he graduated from the courses at the Military Academy of Mechanization and Motorization of the Red Army. Grebennik was promoted to colonel in April 1936.

Grebennik became the commander of the 59th Border Detachment of the NKVD Border Troops in the Primorsky Krai near Posyet in November 1937. In August 1938, he led the border detachment in repelling the first Japanese attacks during the Battle of Lake Khasan. For his leadership in the battle, Grebennik was awarded the Order of the Red Banner.

== World War II ==
Grebennik continued to command the border detachment until November 1942, when he was appointed deputy commander of the Far Eastern NKVD Rifle Division in the Urals Military District. In February 1943, the division was renamed the 102nd Rifle Division and was sent to the Central Front as part of the 70th Army. He served with the division during the Sevsk offensive in Operation Kutuzov. In August, Grebennik became the commander of the 15th Rifle Division. The division advanced during the Chernigov-Pripyat Offensive during August and September. During the fall, it fought in the Gomel-Rechitsa Offensive. In January 1944, the division fought in the Kalinkovichi-Mozyr Offensive. In June, Operation Bagration was launched and the division advanced through Belorussia.

During the East Prussian Offensive in early 1945, the division fought as part of 65th Army's 18th Rifle Corps. Around this time, Grebennik's son Vladimir joined the division as a lieutenant in the medical battalion. On 30 March, Grebennik took over command of the 37th Guards Rifle Division from acting commander Colonel Nikolai Onoprienko after Major General Sobir Rakhimov was killed during the assault on Danzig. Grebennik led the division through the rest of the East Pomeranian Offensive. He organized the division's crossing of the Oder on 20 April and established a bridgehead over the river during the Berlin Offensive. The division captured Kołbaskowo, southwest of Szczecin. By 2 May, the division had advanced 150 kilometers and was on the Baltic Sea northeast of Rostock. Grebennik was awarded the title Hero of the Soviet Union and the Order of Lenin on 29 May for his actions during the Berlin Offensive.

== Postwar ==
On 1 December, the division became the 27th Mechanized Division. It was reduced to regimental strength a year later. In 1946, he served as a witness at the Tokyo War Crimes Tribunal. Grebennik continued to command the division throughout these changes but returned to the Border Troops in August 1947. He was appointed deputy head of the Border Troops in the Transcarpathian Border District. Grebennik was appointed head of the Border Troops of the Ukrainian Border District in December. While in that position, he participated in the fighting against the Ukrainian Insurgent Army. Between 1950 and 1954, he was a deputy of the Supreme Soviet. In November 1951, Grebennik was appointed head of the border troops of the Leningrad District. He became a senior advisor to the Albanian Ministry of Interior Affairs in October 1953. Grebennik became the head of the 1st Department of the Main Directorate of Border and Internal Troops of the USSR in October 1956. During the crushing of the Hungarian Revolution of 1956 in Operation Whirlwind, Grebennik commanded the Soviet forces in the Budapest region and was wounded. From April 1957, he was the chief of staff and first deputy chief of the KGB Border Troops. In July, he was promoted to lieutenant general and became the head of the KGB Border Troops in the Southwestern Frontier District. From January 1960, Grebennik was the head of the operational group of the KGB Border Troops in the Ukrainian Soviet Socialist Republic.

In December 1961, Grebennik was discharged. He lived in Kiev and was a member of the Ukrainian People's Control Committee. He died on 22 September 1974. Grebennik is buried in the Baikove Cemetery. In 1978, his writings were posthumously published as "Хасанский дневник", or Khasan Diary in English.

== Awards and honors ==
USSR

Hero of the Soviet Union (29 May 1945)
Three Orders of Lenin (23 July 1944, 29 May 1945, 6 November 1945)
Order of the Red Banner, five times (25 October 1938, 3 November 1944, 24 November 1950, 14 February 1951, 18 December 1956)
Order of Suvorov, 2nd class (15 January 1944)
Order of Kutuzov, 2nd class (10 April 1945)
Order of the Patriotic War, 1st class (1 March 1944)
Order of the Red Star (28 October 1967)
Medal "For the Liberation of Warsaw" (1945)
Medal "For the Victory over Germany in the Great Patriotic War 1941–1945" (1945)
Jubilee Medal "In Commemoration of the 100th Anniversary of the Birth of Vladimir Ilyich Lenin" (1969)
Jubilee Medal "Twenty Years of Victory in the Great Patriotic War 1941-1945" (1965)
Jubilee Medal "Thirty Years of Victory in the Great Patriotic War 1941–1945" (1975)
Jubilee Medal "XX Years of the Workers' and Peasants' Red Army" (1938)
Jubilee Medal "30 Years of the Soviet Army and Navy" (22 February 1948)
Jubilee Medal "40 Years of the Armed Forces of the USSR" (17 February 1958)
Jubilee Medal "50 Years of the Armed Forces of the USSR" (26 December 1967)
Jubilee Medal "50 Years of the Soviet Militia" (1967)

- Honorary State Security Officer (8 April 1934)

Foreign

Order of Skanderbeg, 3rd degree (Albania)
Virtuti Militari, 3rd class (Poland)
Medal "For Oder, Neisse and the Baltic" (Poland)
Medal "For Warsaw 1939-1945" (Poland)
