= Viktor Zholudev =

Soviet general (1905–1944)

- Виктор Григорьевич Жолудев
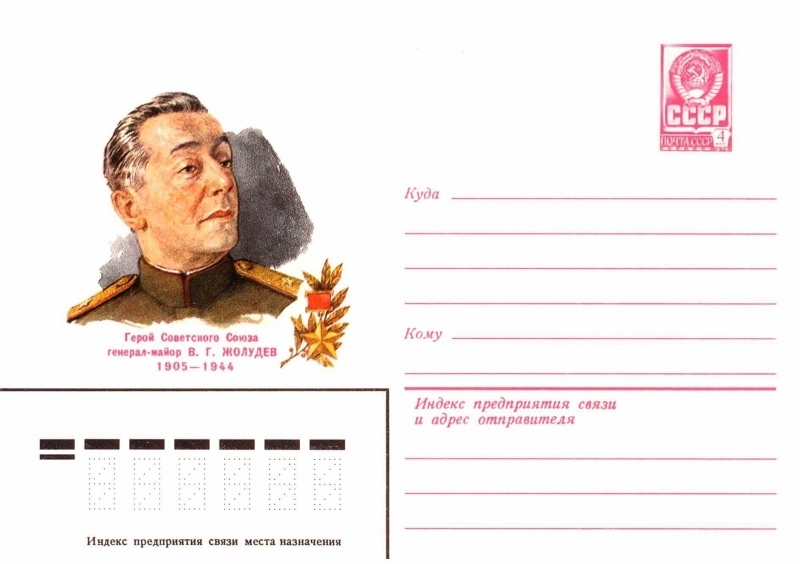
- Born: 22 March 1905; Uglich, Russian Empire
- Died: 21 July 1944 (aged 39); Vawkavysk, Byelorussian SSR
- Military career
- Allegiance: Soviet Union
- Branch: Red Army
- Service years: 1922–1944
- Rank: Major general
- Commands: 199th Rifle Division; 234th Rifle Division; 6th Airborne Brigade; 212th Airborne Brigade; 1st Airborne Corps; 37th Guards Rifle Division; 35th Rifle Corps
- Battles: Sino-Soviet Conflict; Soviet–Japanese Border Wars; Battle of Lake Khasan; Battles of Khalkhin Gol; World War II; First Battle of Kiev; Battle of Stalingrad; Battle of Kursk; Operation Bagration †
- Awards: Hero of the Soviet Union

Viktor Grigoryevich Zholudev (Russian: Ви́ктор Григо́рьевич Жо́лудев; 22 March 1905 – 21 July 1944) was a Red Army major general and posthumous Hero of the Soviet Union. Zholudev fought in the 1929 Sino-Soviet conflict, the Battle of Lake Khasan in 1938 and the 1939 Battles of Khalkhin Gol, as well as World War II. Zholudev commanded the 37th Guards Rifle Division during its defense of the Stalingrad tractor factory during the Battle of Stalingrad.

== Early life ==
Viktor Zholudev was born on 22 March 1905 in Uglich in the Yaroslavl Governorate in a working-class family. After completing lower secondary education, he began working as a log driver at age 14 on the Volga River. In 1921, Zholudev moved to Moscow and worked on the Moskva River.

== Interwar ==
In May 1922, Zholudev was in the Red Army. He was sent to study at the Moscow engineering courses but was soon transferred to the 2nd Infantry Petrograd courses. After graduating in September 1923, Zholudev became a platoon commander in the 106th "Sakhalin" Rifle Regiment of the 36th Rifle Division.

In August 1925, he graduated from the Siberian repeated courses for Red Army commanders in Irkutsk and was appointed commander of a machine gun platoon in the 106th. In 1927, he was promoted to command of the machine gun company. Zholudev fought in the Sino-Soviet conflict over the Chinese Eastern Railway in 1929 and was wounded.

Zholudev graduated in 1930 from the refresher courses for commanders of the Red Army (KUKSA) at Leningrad. After graduation, he became the physical training instructor for the 36th Rifle Division. In May 1932, Zholudev became a battalion commander in the 107th Rifle Regiment. During the early 1930s, the Soviet airborne began to be created, and Zholudev became the commander of the divisional airborne detachment.

In July 1937, he again became a rifle battalion commander in the 107th. Zholudev was appointed a motorized battalion commander in the 57th Special Rifle Corps during August. He became the assistant commander of the 159th Separate Rifle Regiment of the Volga Military District in September 1939. In July 1939, he became the commander of the 110th Separate Rifle Regiment in the Transbaikal Military District. During the summer, he participated in the Battles of Khalkhin Gol.

Zholudev became the deputy chief of military preparations in the Volga Military District from August 1939. In January 1940, he became commander of the 20th Reserve Rifle Brigade in Kazan. He soon transferred to command the 18th Reserve Rifle Brigade. In 1940, he graduated from a two-year course at the Frunze Military Academy. Zholudev was appointed commander of the 199th Rifle Division in the Moscow Military District during March 1941 but was transferred to command the 234th Rifle Division in April. In May he became the commander of the 3rd Airborne Corps' 6th Airborne Brigade.

== World War II ==
When Operation Barbarossa began, the corps was transferred to the Kiev area. German forces composed of Army Group South quickly advanced into the Kiev Fortified Region. German troops captured the Zhuliany airfield and the neighboring village in the outskirts of Kiev. Southwestern Front commander Mikhail Kirponos sent in the 3rd Airborne Corps for a counterattack.

On 6 August, Zholudev led the 6th Airborne Brigade in encircling German troops in Zhuliany airfield and the village, resulting in the capture of the objectives. A German counterattack reportedly broke through to the brigade headquarters and Zholudev organized headquarters troops to repel the attack. He reportedly killed up to 12 German soldiers and was wounded but stayed at the front. Colonel Ivan Zatevakhin's 212th Airborne Brigade and Colonel Alexander Rodimtsev's 5th Airborne Brigade were sent in as reinforcements on 7 August.

On the next day, German troops attacked the airborne positions ten times but were repulsed. German troops again attacked on 9 August under cover of an artillery and aerial bombardment. Airborne troops with Molotov cocktails reportedly destroyed eight German tanks. The 6th Brigade was reinforced by a workers' militia detachment, which was attached to the 1st and 4th Battalions. German troops captured the airfield after four days but were driven back by an offensive by the 3rd Airborne Corps on 13 August. For his actions in defense of Kiev, Zholudev was awarded the Order of the Red Banner on 1 September.

In late August, the corps was transferred to the line of the Seym River north of Konotop to repulse the attacks of the 2nd Panzer Army. Zholudev became the commander of the 212th Airborne Brigade in early September. On 7 September, German troops attempted to cross the Seym but were repulsed. German troops crossed the river on 9 September under cover of a five-hour long artillery and aerial bombardment. The corps reportedly burned 50 German armored vehicles. Under heavy pressure, the Soviet troops withdrew into the Lizogubovsky forest.

The remnants of the 212th were led by Zholudev in raiding German supply depots and other targets in the German rear. On 17 September, they were ordered to break out and linked up with the right flank of the 40th Army on 29 September. During these actions, Zholudev was seriously wounded.

The 1st Airborne Corps was reformed in the Volga Military District during October 1941. After leaving the hospital in December, Zholudev was appointed to command the unit on 15 December. On 19 January 1942 he was promoted to major general. In the spring, the 204th Airborne Brigade was airdropped into the rear of the Demyansk Pocket; the 211th Airborne Brigade in the 1st Guards Cavalry Corps area of operations and the 1st Airborne Brigade near Leningrad to aid the surrounded 2nd Shock Army. However, only the 1st Airborne Brigade returned mostly intact and Zholudev began the reformation of the 204th and 211th.

In August 1942, the corps became the 37th Guards Rifle Division and was subordinated to the 4th Tank Army at the Stalingrad Front. The division repulsed German attempts to cross the Don River and itself established a bridgehead at the village of Trehostrovskoy.

The division was transferred to the 62nd Army on 30 September and moved into Stalingrad on the night of 3 October. Elements of the division crossed the Mokraya Mechyotka river and pushed back German troops from several streets near the Stalingrad Tractor Factory, reinforcing the 112th Rifle Division, 42nd Rifle Brigade and the 308th Rifle Division. The division was involved in fierce fighting to hold the Tractor Factory and suffered heavy losses.

On 14 October, German troops launched a massive attack and aerial bombardment, which inflicted heavy casualties on the division. At noon, 30 German bombers bombed the ravine behind the tractor factory, which contained Zholudev's command post. He was wounded in the bombing after his bunker collapsed and buried him. The German assault was too much for the remnants of the division, so the Tractor Factory was lost. However, several German divisions suffered heavy losses around the Tractor Factory. The division was moved to defend the Barrikady and Krasny Oktyabr factories. During these battles, the division was mostly destroyed.

After Operation Uranus, the remnants of the division were withdrawn from the battlefield, leaving behind a consolidated unit formed from the remnants of the division and the 138th Rifle Division's 118th Rifle Regiment.

After finishing its reformation, the division was sent to the 65th Army of the Central Front and participated in an offensive in the direction of Bryansk during the spring. On 28 April the division was awarded the Order of the Red Banner for its actions at Stalingrad. Zholudev became commander of the 63rd Army's 35th Rifle Corps on 25 June 1943. He led the corps during Operation Kutuzov, the Bryansk Offensive, the Gomel–Rechitsa Offensive and the Rogachev-Zhlobin Offensive. For his actions during these battles, Zholudev was awarded the Order of Suvorov, 2nd class.

In June 1944 Operation Bagration was launched and the corps fought in it. During the Bobruysk Offensive, the corps broke through German defenses and crossed the Drut, Olza and Berezina rivers. The corps captured the towns of Klichaw, Byerazino and Svislach, reportedly advancing 100 kilometers in 5 days. After reaching Minsk, the corps advanced in the direction of Vawkavysk and Białystok.

On 21 July, Zholudev and 3rd Army commander Alexander Gorbatov, along with a group of officers, came under artillery fire east of Vawkavysk while trying to reach an observation post of the 323rd Rifle Division. Gorbatov survived the barrage but Zholudev was killed.

He was posthumously awarded the Order of Kutuzov 1st class on 23 July. On 11 November, Zholudev was posthumously awarded the title Hero of the Soviet Union, as well as the Order of Lenin.
