= Vasily Bantsekin =

Soviet soldier

- Василий Банцекин
- Born: 14 January 1923; Lashino village, Yegoryevsky District, Moscow Province
- Died: November 1943 (aged 20); Gomel Region, Byelorussian SSR, Soviet Union
- Military career
- Allegiance: Soviet Union
- Branch: Red Army
- Service years: 1942–1943
- Rank: Private
- Unit: 37th Guards Rifle Division
- Conflicts: World War II; Operation Kutuzov
- Awards: Hero of the Soviet Union; Order of Lenin; Medal "For Courage"

Vasily Nikolayevich Bantsekin (Russian: Василий Николаевич Банцекин; 14 January 1923 – November 1943) was a Red Army soldier during World War II and a Hero of the Soviet Union. He was awarded the title Hero of the Soviet Union and the Order of Lenin for his actions during Operation Kutuzov and the Chernigov-Pripyat Offensive.

== Early life ==
Bantsekin was born on 14 January 1923 in Lashino village in Yegoryevsky District, Moscow Oblast to a peasant family of Russian ethnicity. In 1933, his family moved to Syzran. He graduated from high school and worked as an apprentice fitter in an automobile garage. Bantsekin became an electrician at the Syzran food concentrate factory.

== World War II ==
On 26 June 1942, Bantsekin was drafted into the Red Army. He was initially assigned to the 380th Reserve Rifle Regiment. In February 1943, he was sent to the Central Front with the 109th Guards Rifle Regiment of the 37th Guards Rifle Division. Bantsekin joined the Communist Party of the Soviet Union. He became a telephonist for the regiment and fought in the Battle of Kursk. During Operation Kutuzov, Bantsekin reportedly was completing the repair of telephone lines when he was surrounded by a 15-man German detachment. Engaging them in combat, he killed nine and caused the remainder to retreat on 9 August while on the outskirts of Dmitrovsk. On 10 August, Bantsekin provided telephone communications from the company commander to the battalion commander during the repulse of German counterattacks. While repairing the line, he reportedly came under mortar fire twelve times.

Bantsekin then fought in the Chernigov-Pripyat Offensive. During the crossing of the Desna River on 12 September near Chernihiv, he was one of the first to cross the river on a raft under fire. On the right bank, when the unit reached a minefield covered by a machine gun nest, Bantsekin reportedly volunteered to cross it first. He dug up 32 mines and then destroyed the machine gun nest with a grenade, allowing the unit to advance. On 21 September during the fight for the village of Kudlaevka, Bantsekin broke into the village with an assault team and helped capture three houses, which were turned into firing points. During the fighting, he reportedly killed 17 German soldiers. By the end of September, he had killed a total of 57 German soldiers. In November, he went missing during the Gomel-Rechitsa Offensive and was officially presumed dead. Bantsekin was awarded the title Hero of the Soviet Union and the Order of Lenin posthumously on 15 January 1944.

== See also ==
- List of people who disappeared
