= Ivan Zatevakhin =

Ivan Ivanovich Zatevakhin
- Native name: Иван Иванович Затевахин
- Born: 17 July 1901; Kobylinka village, Efremov County, Tula Governorate, Russian Empire
- Died: 6 April 1957 (aged 55) Moscow, Soviet Union
- Buried: Novodevichy Cemetery
- Allegiance: Soviet Union
- Branch: Red Army
- Service years: 1919–1957
- Rank: Lieutenant general
- Commands: 212th Airborne Brigade; 3rd Airborne Corps; Separate Airborne Army; Soviet airborne
- Conflicts: Russian Civil War; Battles of Khalkhin Gol; World War II; Battle of Kiev
- Awards: Order of Lenin (2)

Ivan Ivanovich Zatevakhin (Russian: Иван Иванович Затевахин; 17 July 1901 – 6 April 1957) was a Red Army Lieutenant general who commanded the Soviet Airborne Forces (VDV) from 1944 to 1946.

== Early life ==
Ivan Zatevakhin was born on 17 July 1901 in Kobylinka village, Efremov County, Tula Governorate. His father was a blacksmith. On 6 November 1919, he joined the Red Army. Zatevakhin fought in the Russian Civil War, where he commanded a platoon, a company and a battalion. Zatevakhin graduated from the 17th Tula Infantry Commanders school in 1922. In October, he became a platoon commander in the 50th Rifle Regiment of the 17th Rifle Division. In 1924, he graduated from the Lenin Higher Military School in Leningrad. In 1933, Zatevakhin graduated from Frunze Military Academy. In May, he became the chief of the operations staff for the 21st Rifle Division.

In April 1936, Zatevakhin became head of operations staff of the 39th Rifle Corps. In June, he was promoted to major and commanded the 3rd Airborne Regiment in the Far East and also became the Chief of the Airborne Section of the Air Army. In September, Zatevakhin became the commander of the 2nd Airborne Brigade. In October 1938, he became the commander of the 212th Airborne Brigade. Zatevakhin led the brigade during the Battles of Khalkhin Gol in August 1939, where he was wounded. For his actions during the Battle of Khalkin Gol, he was awarded the Order of the Red Banner. In June 1941, five airborne corps were formed and the 212th Airborne Brigade was transferred to the Odessa Military District.

== World War II ==
After Operation Barbarossa, Zatevakhin led the 212th Airborne Brigade during the Battle of Kiev. During the Battle of Kiev, troops of the brigade allegedly repelled German attempts to cross the Desna River. In September, the brigade defended the Konotop sector, where it was temporarily surrounded but broke out after 5 days. Zatevakhin was awarded a second Order of the Red Banner for his actions there. He replaced Vasili Glazunov as the commander of the 3rd Airborne Corps from October to November. On 27 December 1941, he was promoted to major general. In January 1942, he became the deputy head of the Airborne Forces Formation and Staff Directorate. In May, he was appointed the deputy commander of the Soviet Airborne Forces. He commanded the airborne corps during the Dnieper Airborne Operation. In August 1944, Zatevakhin became the commander of the Separate Airborne Army and the commander of the Soviet airborne, replacing Alexander Kapitokhin. On 5 November, he was promoted to lieutenant general.

== Postwar ==
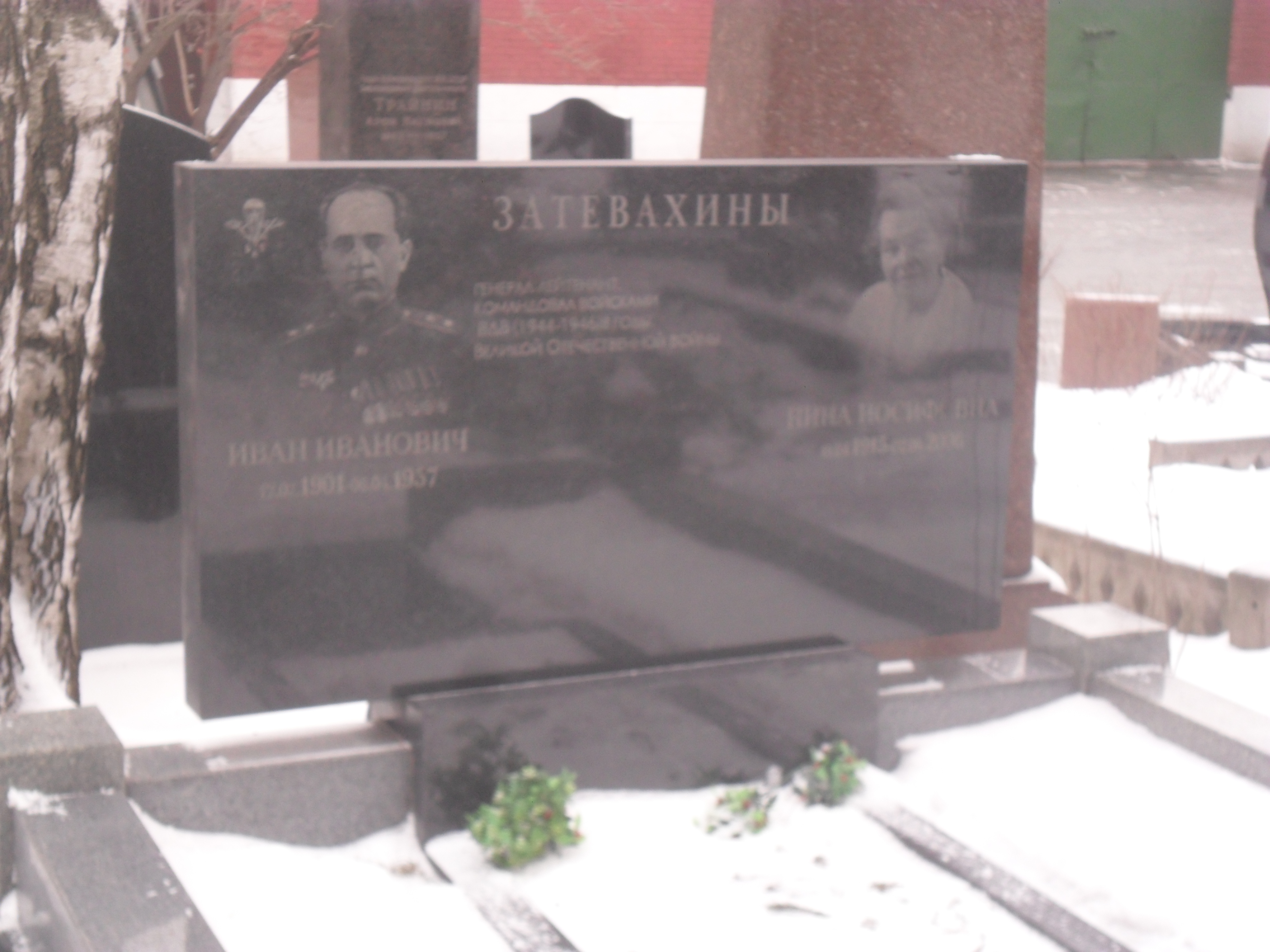
The grave of Lieutenant General Ivan Zatevakhin.

In April 1946, Zatevakhin was replaced as the commander of the Soviet airborne for "poor organization during the transition to peace", which had allegedly led to the death of Colonel Amintayev during a training exercise. Zatevakhin became the deputy commander of the 23rd Army in July. In February 1947, he became a senior instructor at the Military Academy of the General Staff. He died on 6 April 1957 in Moscow and is buried in Novodevichy Cemetery.

== Family ==
Son — Igor Ivanovich Zatevakhin (born February 20, 1936), a specialist in vascular surgery, academician of the Russian Academy of Medical Sciences and the Russian Academy of Sciences, and laureate of the Government of the Russian Federation Prize.

Grandson — Ivan Igorevich Zatevakhin (born September 7, 1959), a Russian television and radio presenter and Candidate of Biological Sciences.
