= 212th Airborne Brigade =

- Active: June 1938–November 1941; November 1941–May 1942
- Country: Soviet Union
- Branch: Soviet Airborne Troops
- Type: Airborne infantry
- Engagements: Battles of Khalkhin Gol; World War II

Commanders
- Notable commanders: Ivan Zatevakhin

The 212th Airborne Brigade (Russian: 212-я воздушно-десантная бригада) was an airborne brigade of the Soviet Airborne Troops, formed twice.

Formed in 1938, it took part in the Battle of Khalkhin Gol in a standard infantry role in 1939. In 1941 it became part of the 3rd Airborne Corps and took part in fighting around Kiev. In November 1941 the remaining soldiers of the corps were used to re-form the 87th Rifle Division. The brigade was reformed when the corps was reformed soon afterwards, but converted into an infantry unit in May 1942 without seeing combat.

== Interwar period ==
By an order of the 2nd Red Banner Army on 10 June 1938, the 212th Separate Airborne Brigade was formed from the 2nd Airborne Regiment at Kuybyshevka-Vostochnaya, under the command of Major Ivan Zatevakhin. The 2nd Airborne Regiment had been formed at Zavitinsk in 1936 with the Special Red Banner Far Eastern Army under Zatevakhin's command with around 1,000 men, part of an airborne force expansion in reaction to increasing tensions in the Soviet Far East. After completing its formation, the brigade was transferred to the Ground Forces. Its table of organization and equipment nominally included an airborne battalion, a mechanized battalion, an artillery battalion, and support units, for a total of 1,689 men. In August 1939, the brigade was transferred to the reserve of the 1st Army Group, fighting in the Battles of Khalkhin Gol with Japanese troops. The 212th fought as standard infantry in the battle, though it was the first combat action of the Soviet airborne. By 18 August, it concentrated in the Khamar-Daba area, part of Army Group commander Georgy Zhukov's mobile reserve force. On 20 August, alongside the units of the 6th Light Tank and 9th Armored Motor Brigades, it advanced into the area of Lake Uzur-Nur, defeating Japanese troops there. The brigade then advanced into the Japanese rear and fought for the fortified Fui heights, helping to break the Japanese right flank. After the end of the battle, 600 Japanese bodies were found on the heights. For actions in the battle, 352 soldiers and Zatevakhin were decorated.

In May 1941, the brigade was transferred to the Odessa Military District. There, it became part of the newly formed 3rd Airborne Corps at Voznesensk, and was expanded to include a headquarters, a separate communications company, a separate bicycle reconnaissance company, four airborne battalions with 546 men each, an artillery battalion, a separate anti-aircraft machine gun company, and a school for junior command personnel, for a total of 2,588 men. It was armed with twelve 45mm anti-tank guns, eighteen 50mm mortars, 288 flamethrowers, sixteen 7.62mm machine guns, and 108 Degtyaryov light machine guns.

== World War II ==
In early July, the brigade was transferred north to the Kiev area with the rest of the corps. On 15 July, it concentrated into the Dudarkovo area, organizing a circular anti-tank and anti-aircraft defense, tasked with air surveillance of the area around the Gogolev and Borispol airfields in order to prevent a German airborne attack. From early August, the brigade fought with the corps in the Battle of Kiev. A battalion from the 212th entered combat on 6 August and was joined by the rest of the brigade on the morning of 7 August. A squad leader of the 212th, Sergeant Yakov Vatomov, became one of the first airborne Heroes of the Soviet Union of the war for leading his platoon in an attack. The brigade was temporarily detached to the Kiev Fortified Region for the defense, and on 21 August, when the troops defending the city in the northern sector began retreating to the Dnieper, it was pulled out and rejoined the corps in the Vortnichi Forest near Brovary. On 23 August, German troops captured the Okunevo bridge and began advancing east, threatening the capture of Oster, a key rear base north of Kiev. The brigade was transferred to Oster to hold the city and on 24 August was given responsibility for the defense of the line of Beliki, Oster, and Vypolzovo. By the morning of 25 August, it was to be reinforced with a rifle regiment and artillery battalion from the 165th Rifle Division, and a flotilla company. For five days the brigade defended Oster, preventing German troops from crossing the Desna River. On 28 August, the brigade and its corps were withdrawn into Southwestern Front reserve.

In early September, Colonel Viktor Zholudev took command of the brigade. On 7 September, German troops attempted to cross the Seym but were repulsed. For actions in early September, rifleman Red Army man Nikolay Obukhov was also made a Hero of the Soviet Union. German troops crossed the river on 9 September under cover of a five-hour long artillery and aerial bombardment. Under heavy pressure, the Soviet troops withdrew into the Lizogubovsky forest. The remnants of the 212th raided German supply depots and other targets in the German rear. On 17 September, they were ordered to break out and linked up with the right flank of the 40th Army on 29 September. During these actions, Zholudev was seriously wounded.

On 1 November, the brigade was still part of the corps, assigned to the Southwestern Front's 40th Army. On 6 November, while defending positions near Kursk, the corps and its brigades were reorganized into the 87th Rifle Division. The 212th Brigade became the 283rd Rifle Regiment of the new division. Later that month, in the North Caucasus Military District at Yeysk and later Yessentuki, the 3rd Airborne Corps was reformed, including the 212th Brigade. In May, as a result of renewed German advances, the corps was converted into the 33rd Guards Rifle Division, and the brigade reorganized into the 91st Guards Rifle Regiment.
