= Nikolai Shchetinin =

Hero of the Soviet Union

Nikolay Ivanovich Shchetinin
- Николай Иванович Щетинин
- Born: 21 March 1921; Mikhayevsky village, Vologda Governorate, Russian SFSR
- Died: 3 October 1968 (aged 47); Vologda, Soviet Union
- Military career
- Allegiance: Soviet Union
- Branch: Red Army
- Service years: 1940–1962
- Rank: Lieutenant colonel
- Unit: 37th Guards Rifle Division
- Conflicts: World War II; Battle of the Dnieper
- Awards: Hero of the Soviet Union

Nikolay Ivanovich Shchetinin (Russian: Николай Иванович Щетинин; 21 March 1921 – 3 October 1968) was a Soviet Army lieutenant colonel and Hero of the Soviet Union. During the Battle of the Dnieper, Shchetinin was a senior lieutenant and was awarded the title Hero of the Soviet Union for his reported leadership of a company in capturing a village against numerically superior German forces.

== Early life ==
Shchetinin was born on 21 March 1921 in the village of Mikhayevsky in what is now the Vozhegodsky District of Vologda Oblast to a peasant family of Russian ethnicity. He graduated from seven grades at the Yavengskoy Junior High School. He also graduated from the factory training school. Shchetinin worked at the locomotive depot station at Nyandoma. In October 1940, he was drafted into the Red Army. After graduating from a regimental cadet school, he was given the rank of Sergeant.

== World War II ==
Shchetinin fought in World War II from 24 June 1941. He was wounded on 6 August during the fighting in Sipkovo village near Velikiye Luki and sent to the hospital. After leaving the hospital after a month of convalescence, he was sent to the Vladimir Military Infantry School. In March 1942, he graduated from the Vladimir Military Infantry School and became a machine gun platoon commander. Shchetinin became commander of a separate service company in June. In June 1943, he became a rifle company commander of the 37th Guards Rifle Division's 109th Guards Rifle Regiment. In September, he joined the Communist Party of the Soviet Union. During the crossing of the Dnieper on 19 October, he reportedly was among the first to cross the river near the village of Starodubka Loev in the Gomel Region. Before the main forces of the regiment arrived, his company reportedly repulsed four German counterattacks and then captured the village of Solvyovo. In these actions, the company reportedly killed 180 German soldiers. He was wounded in the leg on 28 October. For two months, he was treated at the hospital. On return to the regiment, Shchetinin became a deputy battalion commander. However, he was soon seriously wounded and this time spent months in the hospital. On 15 January 1944, Shchetinin was awarded the title Hero of the Soviet Union and the Order of Lenin.

== Postwar ==
Shchetinin graduated from advanced officer training courses in 1946; he then worked in the district military commissariat of Vologda Oblast. Between 1958 and 1962, he was the military commissar of Vologda. In 1962, he retired as a lieutenant colonel due to medical problems caused by his wounds from the war. He died on 30 October 1968 and was buried at the Vedenskoye Military Memorial Cemetery in Vologda.
