= Ivan Zatevakhin (TV presenter) =

Russian television and radio host

- Born: Ivan Igorevich Zatevakhin; September 7, 1959 (age 66); Moscow, RSFSR, Soviet Union
- Citizenship: Moscow
- Occupations: TV presenter radio broadcaster
- Years active: 1992–present

Ivan Igorevich Zatevakhin (Russian: Ива́н И́горевич Затева́хин; born September 7, 1959, Moscow) is a Russian television and radio host, candidate of biological sciences (1988). He is best known as the author and presenter of the popular science program Dialogues about Animals on the TV channel Russia 1. Four-time nominee for TEFI.

== Biography ==
He was born on September 7, 1959, in Moscow in a family of doctors.

His father, Igor Zatevakhin (born 1936), is an academician of the Russian Academy of Medical Sciences, professor, doctor of medical sciences. His mother, Marina Zatevakhina, is an anesthesiologist, an employee of the Scientific Center for Cardiovascular Surgery. His paternal grandfather, Ivan Zatevakhin, is a lieutenant general, former commander of the USSR Airborne Forces.

== Bibliography ==
- Dogs and Us. Trainer's Notes (2015)
