= 1st Red Banner Army =

1st Red Banner Army (1940-1953) 1st Coastal Army (1938-1940)
- 1-я Краснознамённая армия
- Active: 1938–1953
- Country: Soviet Union
- Branch: Red Army / Soviet Army
- Type: Infantry
- Size: Field army
- Part of: Front or Military District
- Engagements: World War II; Invasion of Manchuria
- Decorations: Order of the Red Banner

Commanders
- Notable commanders: Andrey Yeremenko; Afanasy Beloborodov

The 1st Red Banner Army (Russian: 1-я Краснознамённая армия) was a Red Army field army of World War II that served in the Soviet Far East.

== Before 1941 ==
The 1st Army was created in July 1938 under the name of the 1st Coastal Army (or, depending on translation, 1st Maritime Army) in the Far East, part of the Far Eastern Front. Previously, the Special Far Eastern Army had been the theatre command in the Far East, but due to increased tensions with Japan it was expanded into the Far Eastern Front. The 1st Army was created from the Primorsky Group of Forces, and was responsible for the Ussuri area with its headquarters at Voroshilov (now Ussuriysk). Elements of the army fought in the Battle of Lake Khasan. On 4 September, the front was dissolved, and the army became the 1st Separate Red Banner Army, controlling troops in Ussuriysk Oblast and parts of Khabarovsk and Primorsky Oblasts. It was directly subordinated to the People's Commissariat of Defense and operationally controlled the Pacific Fleet. It included the 21st, 22nd, 26th, 32nd, 39th, 40th, 59th, 66th, 92nd, and 105th Rifle Divisions, as well as the 8th, 22nd, and 31st Cavalry Divisions from 4 September. Elements of the army fought in the Battles of Khalkhin Gol in mid-1939.

By an order of the People's Commissariat of Defense dated 21 June 1940, the Far Eastern Front was reformed. The army became part of the front and was redesignated the 1st Red Banner Army.

Its initial commander was the later Marshal of the Soviet Union, Andrei Yeremenko. When Yeremenko arrived in early 1941, the Army was responsible for all the frontier between Vladivostok and Khabarovsk; on 18 March 1941, the 25th Army was established to cover the southern sector. The 32nd, 40th, and 105th Rifle Divisions transferred to the 25th Army in May. In June, the 79th Fighter Aviation Division began forming as part of the army's Air Force. The 32nd and 34th Mixed Aviation Divisions had joined the army by June as well. In June 1941 the 32nd Fighter Aviation Division was located at Voroshilov (Ussuriysk), and included the 6th, 40th, 47th, and 48th Fighter Aviation Regiments.

== Order of battle ==
=== 22 June 1941 ===
The official Soviet archives list the composition of the Army on 22 June 1941:

- 26th Rifle Corps
  - 21st Rifle Division
  - 22nd Rifle Division
  - 26th Rifle Division
- 59th Rifle Corps
  - 39th Rifle Division
  - 59th Rifle Division
  - 1st Rifle Brigade
  - 4th Rifle Brigade
  - 8th Cavalry Division
  - 105th Fortified Region
- 30th Mechanized Corps

=== 9 Aug 1945 ===
- 26th Rifle Corps
- 59th Rifle Corps

6 rifle divisions, 3 tank brigades (75th, 77th, 257th), 3 SP regiments, 6 SP battalions, 1 heavy tank/SP gun regiment, 5 artillery brigades.

== Soviet invasion of Manchuria ==
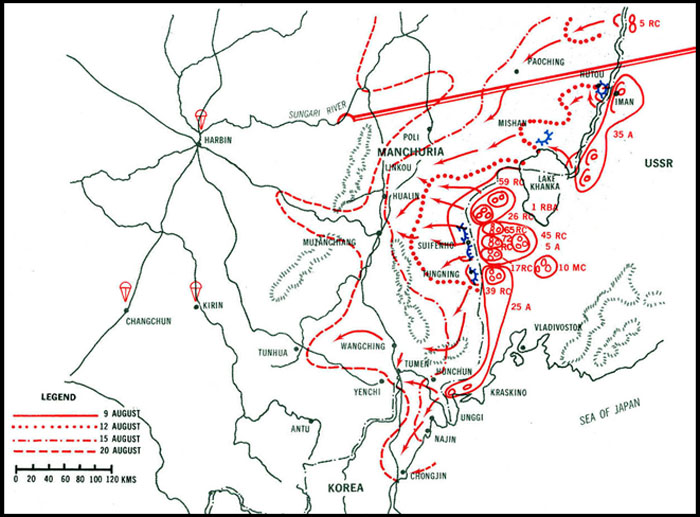
1st Far Eastern Front operations, 9–20 August 1945

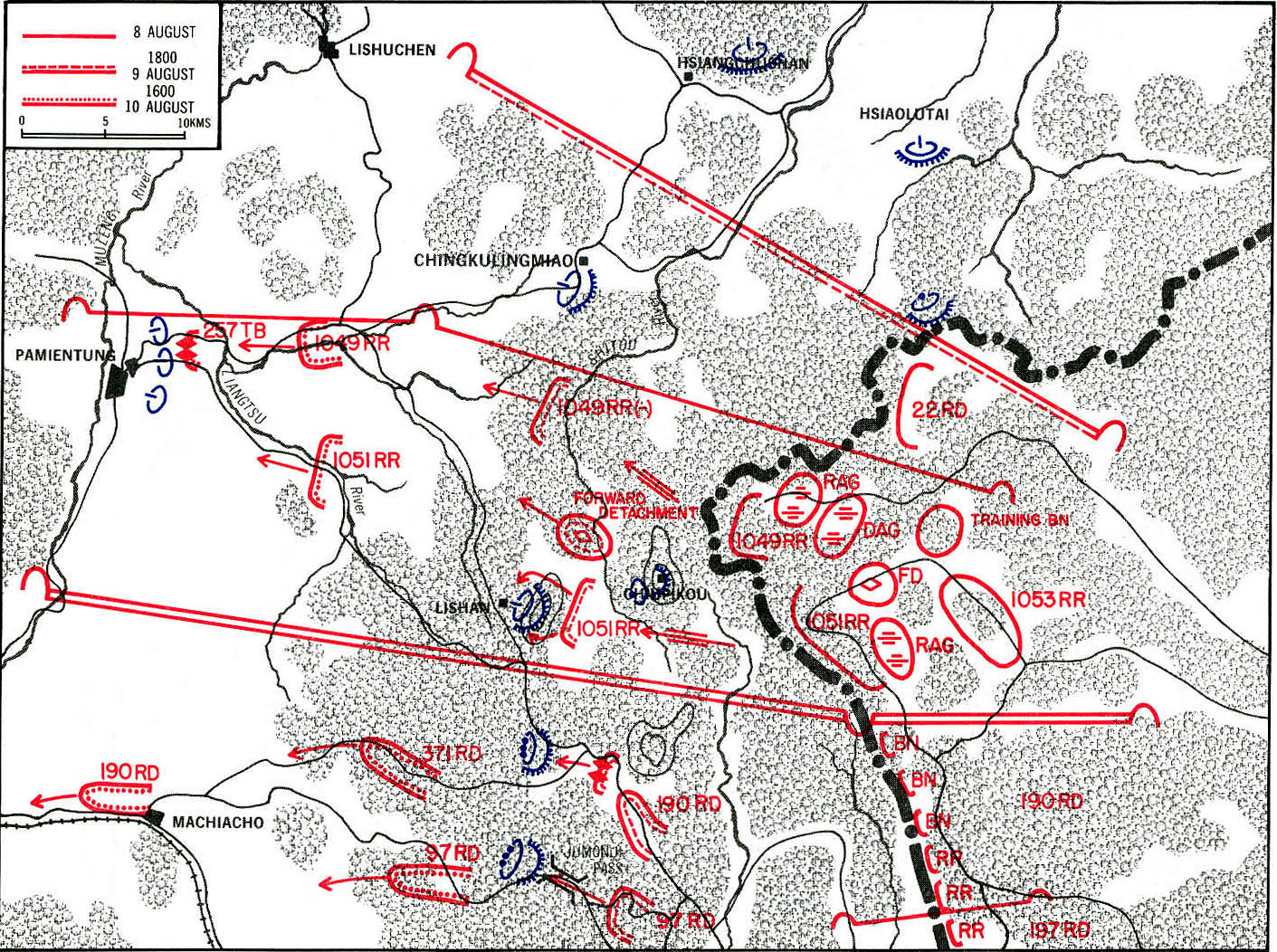
1st Red Banner Army operations, 9 and 10 August 1945

Until the war's end in 1945, the 1st Red Banner Army covered some of the long far eastern borders of the Soviet Union. In August 1945, the Soviet Union declared war on Japan, and the Soviet Far East Front attacked into Japanese-occupied Manchuria, as part of the Soviet invasion of Manchuria, led by Marshal of the Soviet Union Aleksandr Vasilevsky. The area the Army was to operate through was mountainous, rugged taiga, and it was specifically tailored to the conditions it would face, in common with the other formations earmarked for the operation. The Army's forces at the beginning of the offensive included 26th and 59th Rifle Corps, 6 rifle divisions, 3 tank brigades (75th, 77th, 257th), 3 SP regiments, 6 SP battalions, 1 heavy tank/SP gun regiment, 5 artillery brigades, and 410 tanks/SP guns and 1,413 guns/mortars. The 6th and 112th Fortified Regions also formed part of the Army. The First Army's attack was aimed at northern Manchukuo.

== Postwar ==
In September 1945 the army became part of the newly formed Transbaikal–Amur Military District after moving its headquarters to Blagoveshchensk, where it absorbed troops from the disbanded 15th Army and 2nd Red Banner Army. On 1 October it included the 26th Rifle Corps with the 3rd, 12th, and 231st Rifle Divisions, the 59th Rifle Corps with the 39th and 59th Rifle Divisions, and the 101st Fortified Region. By the end of the year, the 35th Rifle Division had joined the 59th Rifle Corps and the 4th and 102nd Fortified Regions became part of the army. In 1946, the three fortified regions were converted into the 13th and 14th Machine Gun Artillery Brigades. The headquarters of the 26th Rifle Corps was disbanded in July, and the 3rd and 59th Rifle Divisions disbanded on 30 August. The 59th Rifle Corps was disbanded in March 1947.

In May, the army was transferred to the Far Eastern Military District after the Transbaikal–Amur Military District was disbanded. It included the 37th Guards Airborne Corps with three divisions, the 13th and 14th Machine Gun Artillery Brigades, and the 12th and 39th Rifle Divisions, the former at Kuybyshevka-Vostochnaya and the latter at Khabarovsk. In 1948, the army included the 11th and 13th Machine Gun Artillery Divisions, formed from the 34th Rifle Division and the 11th, 13th, and 14th Machine Gun Artillery Brigades, previously reorganized into regiments. The army headquarters was disbanded in April 1953.

== Commanders ==
The following officers commanded the army during its existence:

- Kuzma Podlas 1938 – 1939
- Markian Popov 07.1939 – 01.1941
- Andrei Yeremenko 01.1941 – 06.1941
- Lieutenant General Vasily Vasilyev 06.1941 – 10.1942
- Lieutenant General Mikhail Savushkin 10.1942 – 06.1945
- Colonel General Afanasy Beloborodov (28 June 1945 – 12 June 1946)
- Lieutenant General Alexei Danilov (12 June – 30 July 1946)
- Colonel General Vladimir Kolpakchi (30 July 1946 – 12 March 1950)
- Colonel General Dmitry Lelyushenko (13 March 1950 – 24 April 1953)

== Sources ==
=== Bibliography ===
- Dvoinykh, L.V.; Kariaeva, T.F.; Stegantsev, M.V., eds. (1991). Центральный государственный архив Советской армии [Central State Archive of the Soviet Army] (in Russian). Vol. 1. Minneapolis: Eastview Publications. ISBN 1-879944-02-2.
- Dvoinykh, L.V.; Kariaeva, T.F.; Stegantsev, M.V., eds. (1993). Центральный государственный архив Советской армии [Central State Archive of the Soviet Army] (in Russian). Vol. 2. Minneapolis: Eastview Publications. ISBN 1-879944-03-0.
- Feskov, V.I.; Golikov, V.I.; Kalashnikov, K.A.; Slugin, S.A. (2013). Вооруженные силы СССР после Второй Мировой войны: от Красной Армии к Советской [The Armed Forces of the USSR after World War II: From the Red Army to the Soviet: Part 1 Land Forces] (in Russian). Tomsk: Scientific and Technical Literature Publishing. ISBN 9785895035306.
- "Movement to contact and commitment to combat of reserve fronts". Military Thought. 13 (2). Archived from the original on 21 March 2006 – via FindArticles.
