= Alexander Nikolayev =

Red army senior lieutenant

Alexander Petrovich Nikolayev
- Александр Петрович Николаев
- Born: 14 November 1918; Strakhinovo village, Bezhetsky Uyezd, Tver Governorate, Russian Empire
- Died: 13 June 2009 (aged 90); Tver, Russia
- Military career
- Allegiance: Soviet Union
- Branch: Red Army
- Service years: 1939–1946
- Rank: Senior lieutenant
- Unit: 37th Guards Rifle Division
- Conflicts: World War II; Winter War; Eastern Front; Battle of Berlin
- Awards: Hero of the Soviet Union; Order of Lenin; Order of the Red Banner (2); Order of the Patriotic War, 1st class

Alexander Petrovich Nikolayev (Russian: Александр Петрович Николаев; 14 November 1918 – 13 June 2009) was a Red Army senior lieutenant and Hero of the Soviet Union. He received the title Hero of the Soviet Union and the Order of Lenin for his actions during the Battle of Berlin. Nikolayev also fought in the Siege of Leningrad.

== Early life ==
Alexander Nikolayev was born on 14 November 1918 in the village of Strakhinovo in Bezhetsky Uyezd of the Tver Governorate to a peasant family. He graduated from junior high school. After graduation, Nikolayev worked as a shepherd on the farm. In 1935, he moved to Leningrad and became a plumber. In October 1939, he was drafted into the Red Army.

== World War II ==
Nikolayev fought in the Winter War as a driver in the 824th Motor Transport Battalion. On 22 June 1941, he was stationed with the 13th Tank Brigade. He fought in the early stages of the Siege of Leningrad. When the tank brigade was sent to reform in the area of Staraya Russa, Nikolayev transferred to become a driver in the 128th Rifle Division's 15th Motor Transport Battalion. The remnants of the division retreated into the Sinyavino swamps. After Nikolayev's truck was destroyed in a bombing raid, he fought with a rifle platoon. By then a senior sergeant, Nikolayev became the platoon commander. In December, German infantry began to attack. After letting the German troops advance a hundred meters, the platoon opened fire with machine guns. Reportedly, none of the German troops escaped and eleven wounded were taken prisoner. He became a candidate member of the Communist Party of the Soviet Union in February and was promoted to junior lieutenant. In March 1942, Nikolayev led a reconnaissance patrol in the area of the Chernaya River. After the patrol had captured two German prisoners and was preparing to withdraw, it was ordered to occupy the trench. He helped the patrol repulse multiple German attacks but was wounded in the evening.

While in the hospital, Nikolayev was promoted to lieutenant. Due to the lack of officers in the regiment, he became a company commander. In August 1942, the division fought in the Sinyavino Offensive. The 741st Rifle Regiment helped capture Worker's Settlement No. 8. Nikolayev reportedly captured a bunker with six machine guns and attacked the German headquarters, capturing two officers and a radio operator. During the battle for Worker's Settlement No.5, he was wounded four times. Three of the bullets passed through the soft tissue, but the fourth was in the shoulder. These wounds were severe enough to send him into the hospital.

After being discharged from the hospital, Nikolayev was sent to the "Vystrel" Commander's Courses in Sverdlovsk, from which he graduated in March 1943. In the spring, he became a company commander in the 197th Tank Brigade's mechanized infantry battalion. The brigade was part of the 30th Ural Volunteer Tank Corps. Nikolayev fought in the Operation Kutuzov in August. On 8 August, he led the company during heavy fighting for control of the village of Volosatov. Nikolayev reportedly distracted the German troops with a smokescreen and machine gun fire to their front while he led a platoon into the ravines in the German rear area. The platoon attacked a German firing point, the signal for an attack by the battalion. The village was captured and the German troops reportedly lost 600 killed. After several more days of fighting, Nikolayev was severely wounded and sent to the hospital again. On 28 August, he was awarded the Order of the Red Banner for his actions.

While in the hospital, Nikolayev was promoted to senior lieutenant. In fall 1944, he became a rifle company commander in the 37th Guards Rifle Division's 118th Guards Rifle Regiment. He fought in the fighting to hold the Narew bridgehead. During the Narew bridgehead fighting, he was wounded by shrapnel in the leg. Nikolayev continued to fight in combat and participated in the capture of Graudenz in January 1945 and the East Pomeranian Offensive. During the capture of Danzig between 21 and 23 March, Nikolayev reportedly led his company in breaking through German positions, killing 80 German troops and capturing 12. On 23 March, he was wounded in action but did not leave the frontline. He was recommended for the Order of Alexander Nevsky but instead awarded the Order of the Red Banner on 6 May. On 20 April, Nikolayev led his company across the Oder near Schillersdorf, southwest of Stettin. The company held off German counterattacks until the rest of the regiment arrived. In this action, he was wounded again. On 29 June 1945, Nikolayev was awarded the title Hero of the Soviet Union and the Order of Lenin for his actions during the Oder crossing.

== Postwar ==
In August 1946, Nikolayev was discharged from active duty due to illness. Returning home, he became the chairman of the village council in Puzyrevsky. In September 1947, he was hired by the Ministry of Internal Affairs and worked in various positions in the forced labor system. He graduated from the Kazan military-political school in 1951. Nikolayev was dismissed from the internal affairs ministry in 1954 on grounds of redundancy. He became a mechanic at the Kalinin Artificial Fiber Factory, where he led the party organization. Nikolayev graduated from the University of Marxism-Leninism. On 6 April 1985, he was awarded the Order of the Patriotic War, 1st class for the 40th anniversary of World War II. After retirement, he lived in Orsha village and became an honorary citizen of Tver in 1997. He died on 13 June 2009. Nikolayev was buried in the local Dmitrovo-Cherkassy Cemetery.
