= 59th Rifle Division =

- Active: 1932–1947
- Country: Soviet Union
- Branch: Red Army
- Type: Infantry
- Engagements: World War II; Invasion of Manchuria
- Decorations: Order of the Red Banner

The 59th Rifle Division (Russian: 59-я стрелковая дивизия) was an infantry division of the Red Army and briefly of the Soviet Army.

It was originally formed in 1932 as the 1st Kolkhoz Rifle Division, and redesignated as the 59th Rifle Division in 1936. The division spent World War II in the Primorye region and fought in the Soviet invasion of Manchuria. The division was disbanded several years after the war ended.

== History ==
The division was formed in March 1932 as the 1st Kolkhoz Rifle Division, part of the Special Kolkhoz Corps of the Special Red Banner Far Eastern Army (OKDVA), covering the Grodekovo direction against expected Japanese attack with headquarters in Primorsky Oblast. A voluntary program to resettle demobilized Red Army soldiers and their families in the border areas of the Soviet Far East was established in 1929–1930, in order to increase the population and economic activity of such areas, supply food to the Special Red Banner Far Eastern Army, and to provide a force for its defense. By 1932 42 Red Army Kolkhozes had been established under the program. However, due to labor shortages and a lack of construction materials, engineers, and technicians, most of the settlers returned to their former homes; by 1932, only 1,476 remained out of 8,134 who arrived between 1930 and 1932. To address the issues, the Special Kolkhoz Corps was created, utilizing conscripts to garrison the frontier area. The rifle divisions of the corps were formed from regiments of the 2nd Priamur Rifle Division, headquartered in Khabarovsk.

The division was reorganized as the 59th Rifle Division on 25 May 1936 using cadre arriving from the European parts of the Soviet Union. The division was a cadre unit and remained part of the 26th Rifle Corps, formed from the Special Kolkhoz Corps, in the OKDVA. The division was based in Primorye in the area of Lake Khanka. On 22 June 1941, the division included the following elements:

- 5th Rifle Regiment
- 99th Rifle Regiment
- 124th Rifle Regiment
- 37th Artillery Regiment
- 45th Howitzer Artillery Regiment (456th Separate Self-Propelled Artillery Battalion from January 1942)
- 45th Reconnaissance Battalion
- 101st Separate Anti-Tank Battalion
- 35th Sapper Battalion
- 8th Separate Signals Battalion
- 352nd Auto Transport Company
- 17th Medical-Sanitary Battalion
- 49th Separate Chemical Defense Company
- 28th Field Bakery

The division spent the war covering the border in Primorye. Colonel Matvey Batrakov took command on 31 May 1944 and was promoted to major general on 20 April 1945. In August 1945, as part of the 26th Rifle Corps of the 1st Red Banner Army of the 1st Far Eastern Front, the division fought in the Harbin–Kirin offensive during the Soviet invasion of Manchuria. In recognition of its performance during the invasion, the 59th was awarded the Order of the Red Banner on 19 September 1945.

After the end of the war, the division remained part of the 59th Rifle Corps of the 1st Red Banner Army. The 59th was disbanded in May 1947.

== Commanders ==
The following commanders led the division during its existence:

- Kombrig (promoted to Major General 4 June 1940) Vasily Glazunov (3 July 1939–23 June 1941)
- Colonel (promoted to Major General 8 December 1941) Alexey Gnechko (9 July 1941–9 January 1942)
- Colonel (promoted to Major General 7 December 1942) Ivan Pashkov (10 January 1942–25 June 1943)
- Colonel Fyodor Suin (26 June 1943–12 May 1944)
- Colonel (promoted to Major General 20 April 1945) Matvey Batrakov (31 May 1944–May 1947)

== See also ==
- Military settlement
