= Vasily Glazunov =

Soviet military commander

Vasily Afanasyevich Glazunov
- Native name: Василий Афанасьевич Глазунов
- Born: 1 January [O.S. 20 December 1895] 1896; Varvarovka village, Serdobsky Uyezd, Saratov Governorate, Russian Empire
- Died: 26 June 1967 Moscow, Soviet Union
- Buried: Novodevichy Cemetery
- Allegiance: Russian Empire; Soviet Union
- Branch: Russian Imperial Army, Red Army, Soviet airborne
- Service years: 1915-1918, 1918-1954
- Rank: Lieutenant general
- Commands: 59th Rifle Division 3rd Airborne Corps; Soviet airborne 4th Guards Rifle Corps 125th Rifle Corps
- Conflicts: World War I; Brusilov Offensive; Russian Civil War; World War II; Battle of Kiev; Battles of Rzhev; Nikopol–Krivoi Rog Offensive; Odessa Offensive; Vistula-Oder Offensive; Berlin Offensive
- Awards: Hero of the Soviet Union (twice); Order of Lenin (3); Order of the Red Banner (3); Order of Suvorov 2nd class Order of Kutuzov 2nd class

Vasily Afanasyevich Glazunov (Russian: Василий Афанасьевич Глазунов; 1 January [O.S. 20 December 1895] 1896 – 27 June 1967) was a Soviet lieutenant general, who was the first commander of the Soviet airborne forces (VDV). He was twice awarded the Hero of the Soviet Union.

== Early life ==
Vasily Afanasyevich Glazunov was born on 1 January 1896 in Varvarovka village, Serdobsky Uyezd, Saratov Governorate in the Russian Empire, to a family of peasants. In 1908, he graduated from third grade. Glazunov worked for the landowners until 1914.

== World War I ==
In August 1915, Glazunov joined the Imperial Russian Army and became a private in the 135th Reserve Battalion in Balashov. In September, he was transferred to the 195th Infantry Regiment in Baranovichi. He fought in battles on the Southwestern Front. Glazunov became sick with Typhoid fever in December and was sent to the hospital. In February 1916, he became a squad leader in the 198th Alexander Nevsky Infantry Regiment, fighting on the Southwestern Front. Glazunov was demobilized in February 1918 as a junior noncommissioned officer.

== Russian Civil War ==
In July 1918, Glazunov was drafted into the Red Army and sent to a Turkestan regiment in the 4th Army. In November 1918, he became a section leader in the 1st Samara Reserve Regiment and in February 1919 a squad leader in the Serdobsk Reserve Regiment. Fighting in the 25th Separate Rifle Battalion, Glazunov participated in the Bukhara operation. He eventually became the battalion commander. In July 1921, he became the assistant commander of the 14th Turkestan Rifle Regiment, fighting against the Basmachi movement.

== Interwar ==
Glazunov was appointed commander of a battalion of the 12th Turkestan Rifle Regiment in September 1923. In October, Glazunov became ill with malaria and was sent to the hospital. After his recovery, he became a battalion commander in the 251st Rifle Regiment of the 84th Rifle Division. In 1926, Glazunov joined the Communist Party of the Soviet Union. In December 1928, he was sent to the Vystrel course and graduated in August 1929. In December 1931, he was appointed to command the 5th Separate Territorial Rifle Battalion. In January 1933, Glazunov became the commander of the 142nd Rifle Regiment of the 48th Rifle Division in Rzhev.

In July 1934, he became the assistant commander of the 168th Rifle Regiment of the 56th Rifle Division in Porkhov. In June 1937, Glazunov became assistant commander of the division and in July 1939 became the commander of the 59th Rifle Division. In December 1940, he was sent to the advance training courses at Frunze Military Academy, from which he graduated in May 1941.

== World War II ==
Glazunov returned to the 59th Rifle Division in the far east. On 23 June, he was appointed commander of 3rd Airborne Corps in Pervomaisk. He fought in the Battle of Kiev. On 29 August, Glazunov became the commander of the Soviet Airborne Troops. He organized the training of the airborne and the formation of ten airborne corps and five brigades. In January and February 1942, Glazunov planned and conducted the Vyazma Airborne Operation during the Rzhev-Vyazma Offensive. On 27 March 1942, he was awarded the Order of the Red Banner. In June 1943, Glazunov was released from command and became the deputy commander of the 29th Guards Rifle Corps.

In November, he became the commander of the 4th Guards Rifle Corps, which he would lead until the end of the war. Glazunov led the corps through the Battle of the Dnieper, the Nikopol–Krivoi Rog Offensive and the Odessa Offensive. During January and February 1944, the corps broke through German fortifications near the village of Novonikolayevka, expanding the Nikopol bridgehead and capturing 96 settlements. On 19 March, Glazunov was awarded the title Hero of the Soviet Union and the Order of Lenin for his leadership during the Nikopol-Krivoi Rog Offensive.

In early June 1944, the corps was transferred to the 1st Belorussian Front at Kovel. Under Glazunov's command, the corps fought in the Lublin–Brest Offensive, during which it crossed the Bug River. During the Vistula–Oder Offensive, the corps crossed the Vistula and captured a number of settlements, for which it was awarded the title 'Brandenburg'. On 6 April 1945, Glazunov was awarded a second Hero of the Soviet Union and the Order of Lenin for his actions in holding the Magnushev bridgehead during the Lublin–Brest Offensive. During the Berlin Offensive, the corps took part in the breakthrough in the Battle of the Seelow Heights and crossed the Spree. In Berlin, the corps captured the Ministry of Aviation and the Reich Ministry of Public Enlightenment and Propaganda. For his leadership in the capture of Berlin, Glazunov was awarded a third Order of Lenin.

== Postwar ==
Glazunov continued to command the corps as part of the 8th Guards Army. In January 1946, he was appointed commander of the 125th Rifle Corps, and in June the inspector general of the Airborne Forces. In May 1949, he studied at the Higher military Academy Marshal Kliment Voroshilov and graduated from there in 1950. In September 1950, Glazunov became the assistant commander of the East Siberian Military District. In October 1950, Glazunov went to China as an advisor with the People's Liberation Army. In June 1954, he retired due to illness. In 1955, he moved to the village of Sheremetyevsky, which is now part of Dolgoprudny. Glazunov died on 27 June 1967 in Moscow and is buried in Novodevichy Cemetery, next to his wife Xenia, who died in 1984.

== Legacy ==
In 1951, a bronze bust of Glazunov was installed in the village of Kolyshley in the Penza Oblast. On 30 September 2011, a street in Penza was named after Glazunov. A street in Dolgoprudny is also named after Glazunov.

== Awards ==
- Twice Hero of the Soviet Union (19 March 1944 and 6 April 1945)
- Three Order of Lenin (19 March 1944, 6 April 1945, 29 May 1945)
- Three Order of the Red Banner (27 March 1942, 11 March 1944, 20 June 1949)
- Order of Suvorov 2nd class (22 February 1944)
- Order of Kutuzov 2nd class (23 August 1944)
- Two Order of the Red Star (16 August 1936, 28 October 1967)
- Virtuti Militari, silver Cross
- campaign and jubilee medals
