= Rogachev–Zhlobin offensive =

Soviet-led military offensive

- Part of World War II
Date	21–26 February 1944
Location	Rogachev-Zhlobin
Result	Soviet Victory

Belligerents
Soviet Union	Germany

Commanders and leaders
(Soviet Union) Konstantin Rokossovsky (Soviet Union) Viktor Zholudev	(Nazi Germany) Ernst Bush (Nazi Germany) Josef Harpe

Strength
232,000	Unknown

Casualties and losses
31,277 Casualties	4,000–24,000 Killed, many captured, up to 62 big guns, 13 tanks and 8,000 mines captured

The Rogachev–Zhlobin offensive was a Soviet-led military offensive that took place from 21 to 26 February 1944 within the Eastern Front of World War II. Soviet forces aimed to advance through Rogachev and defeat the German 9th Army of Army Group Centre, which culminated with the movements of other units in preparation of Operation Bagration.

== Background ==
Germany captured Rogachev during the beginning stages of Operation Barbarossa. The area of Rogachev, was part of Adolf Hitler's Rogachev-Vetibsk line during the later stages of the war and was named a stronghold. The line did prove effective, holding the Soviet troops in a stalemate for a month.

== The Operation ==
The operation to take Rogachev and Zhlobin took place simultaneously with another separate operation to take Vitebsk, starting on 21 February. During the initial stages of the offensive, Marshal Rokossovsky of the 1st Belorussian Front was able to drive a 16-mile wedge into the German lines, liberating Zhlobin and at least 30 other villages and towns. In an attempt to seal the gap, the German commander threw fresh troops into the lines. About fourteen separate counterattacks were made, culminating in about 2,500 losses. Though the Germans fighting was considered fierce, the Soviet troops surged forward after the counterattacks and seized 13 tanks, 40 guns, and 8,000 mines along with large amounts of prisoners.
