= Nikolai Onoprienko =

Soviet Red Army colonel (1911–1979)

- Николай Николаевич Оноприенко
- Born: 19 December 1911; Uil, Aktobe Region, Russian Empire
- Died: 12 November 1979 (aged 67); Orenburg, Russian SFSR, Soviet Union
- Military career
- Allegiance: Soviet Union
- Branch: Red Army
- Service years: 1931–1954
- Rank: Colonel
- Unit: 37th Guards Rifle Division
- Conflicts: World War II; Battle of Moscow; Battle of Kursk; Operation Bagration; Berlin Offensive
- Awards: Hero of the Soviet Union; Order of Lenin; Order of the Red Banner (3x); Order of Suvorov, 3rd class; Order of Kutuzov, 3rd class; Order of Alexander Nevsky; Order of the Red Star; Medal "For Courage; Order of the British Empire; Cross of Valour

Nikolai Nikolayevich Onoprienko (Russian: Николай Николаевич Оноприенко, Ukrainian: Микола Миколайович Онопрієнко, romanized: Mykola Mykolaiovych Onopriyenko; 19 December 1911 – 12 November 1979) was a Red Army colonel and World War II Hero of the Soviet Union. Onoprienko fought in the Battle of Smolensk, the Battle of Moscow, the Battle of Kursk, Operation Kutuzov, Operation Bagration, the East Prussian Offensive and the Berlin Offensive.

== Early life ==
Onoprienko was born on 19 December 1911 in the village of Uil in Aktobe Region to a peasant family of Ukrainian ethnicity. In 1927, he graduated from seven years of education and worked at his father's farm. In August 1930, he became the foreman of the village "Felix Dzerzhinsky" Kolkhoz.

In July 1931, Onoprienko was drafted into the Red Army. He graduated from the school of the 14th Turkestan Mountain Rifle Regiment of the 3rd Turkestan Rifle Division in the Central Asian Military District in May 1932 at Termez. Shortly afterwards, Onoprienko was admitted to the Combined Central Asian Red Banner Military School, from which he graduated in 1934. In May, he became a platoon commander in the 1st Mountain Rifle Regiment of the 83rd Turkestan Mountain Rifle Division. He was promoted in September 1935 to the command of a company. In June 1936, Onoprienko transferred to command a company in the division's 45th Mountain Rifle Regiment. In 1937, he was awarded a gold watch for the excellent organization of combat training in his unit. In December 1938, Onoprienko was sent to the Vystrel course and graduated in June 1939. He was appointed the commander of the 45th Mountain Rifle Regiment's reconnaissance company in Kushka. Onoprienko became the chief of the regimental school of the 83rd Mountain Division in October. In 1941, he joined the Communist Party of the Soviet Union. He became the 45th Mountain Rifle Regiment's deputy commander in Ashgabat during February.

== World War II ==
In August 1941, Onoprienko became the commander of a rifle battalion of the 36th Rifle Brigade in the 16th Army. He fought in the Battle of Smolensk, the Vyazma Defensive Operation and the Battle of Moscow, in which he was wounded on 28 December. After leaving the hospital in February 1942, Onoprienko became commander of the 134th Rifle Brigade's mortar battalion on the Bryansk Front. On 20 September, he was awarded the Medal "For Courage". Promoted to major, he commanded the 74th Rifle Division's 78th Rifle Regiment from October. In February 1943, he reportedly distinguished himself during the Maloarkhangelsk Offensive, for which he was awarded the Order of the Red Banner on the 11th.

Onoprienko became the commander of the 15th Rifle Division's 676th Rifle Regiment in April 1943 after being promoted to lieutenant colonel. On 10 June, he was awarded the Order of Alexander Nevsky. During the Battle of Kursk, the 676th was positioned on the northern end of the Kursk Bulge, on the boundary with the 81st Rifle Division. On 5 July, the regiment was attacked by German infantry from the 292nd Infantry Division supported by Ferdinand tank destroyers. The regiment was surrounded but was able to break out during the night and fought throughout 6 July. On the next day, the depleted regiment was withdrawn from the front. Onoprienko was awarded his second Order of the Red Banner for his leadership at Kursk. He continued to lead the 676th and fought in Operation Kutuzov in August. The regiment participated in the Chernigov-Pripyat Offensive in September and October and the Gomel-Rechitsa Offensive in November. During the Gomel-Rechitsa Offensive, Onoprienko was wounded on 7 November. After recovering, he returned to command of the regiment.

In May 1944, Onoprienko became deputy commander for combat units of the 193rd Rifle Division. In June 1944, he was transferred to command the 118th Guards Rifle Regiment of the 87th Guards Rifle Division. During Operation Bagration, the division was part of the attack on Baranovichi. Onoprienko led the 118th around the German flank and advanced into the city, allowing other Soviet divisions to push German troops out of Baranovichi. On 28 August, he was awarded the Order of Suvorov 3rd class for his leadership. In September and October, the regiment held on to the Serock bridgehead on the Vistula.

At the beginning of the East Prussian Offensive in January 1945, the regiment broke through German lines and reportedly advanced more than 10 kilometers in five days. For his leadership, he was awarded the Order of Kutuzov 3rd class on 16 February. In February, Onoprienko became deputy commander for combat units of the 37th Guards Rifle Division. He fought in the East Pomeranian Offensive and the assault on Danzig. During the assault on Danzig, division commander Major General Sobir Rakhimov was killed on 26 March. Onoprienko took command and completed the division's assault on Danzig before being replaced by Major General Kuzma Grebennik on 30 March. On 19 April, the advanced forces of the division crossed the eastern branch of the Oder and were stopped by German troops positioned on a large river island. The vanguard of the division was led by Onoprienko. He reportedly organized communications with artillery, allowing the forward movement of 45mm guns. Fire from the 45mm guns allowed the troops to successfully assault the island. On the night of 20 April, the advance regiment of the division crossed the western branch of the Oder and created a bridgehead. Onoprienko attacked the main objectives and captured high ground and a brick factory. From these positions, the regiment reportedly repulsed 18 counterattacks and provided a bridgehead for the crossing of the rest of the division. On 29 June, Onoprienko was awarded the title Hero of the Soviet Union and the Order of Lenin.

== Postwar ==
Following the end of the war, Onoprienko remained with the 37th Guards, becoming the commander of its 118th Guards Rifle Regiment in July 1945. He continued in this post after the regiment was reorganized into the 88th Guards Mechanized Regiment in October of that year when the division became the 27th Guards Mechanized Division. Appointed military commissar of the Tuymazinsky District Military Commissariat in July 1947, Onoprienko was transferred to the same post for Chkalovsky District in the city of Chkalov (renamed Orenburg) in 1948. The latter proved to be his last position before he transferred to the reserve in 1954. Onoprienko lived in Orenburg and worked in the oblast road construction trust. He died on 12 November 1979 and is buried in Orenburg.

== Awards and honors ==
USSR

Hero of the Soviet Union (29 June 1945)
Order of Lenin (29 June 1945)
Order of the Red Banner, three times (11 February 1943, 13 July 1943, ?)
Order of Suvorov, 3rd class (28 April 1944)
Order of Kutuzov, 3rd class (16 February 1945)
Order of Alexander Nevsky (6 August 1943)
Order of the Red Star
Medal "For Courage" (20 September 1942)
Medal "For Battle Merit" (3 November 1944)
Medal "For the Defence of Moscow" (1944)
Medal "For the Liberation of Warsaw" (1945)
Medal "For the Victory over Germany in the Great Patriotic War 1941–1945" (1945)
Jubilee Medal "Twenty Years of Victory in the Great Patriotic War 1941-1945" (1965)
Jubilee Medal "Thirty Years of Victory in the Great Patriotic War 1941–1945" (1975)
Jubilee Medal "In Commemoration of the 100th Anniversary of the Birth of Vladimir Ilyich Lenin" (1969)
Jubilee Medal "30 Years of the Soviet Army and Navy" (1948)
Jubilee Medal "40 Years of the Armed Forces of the USSR" (1958)
Jubilee Medal "50 Years of the Armed Forces of the USSR" (1968)
Jubilee Medal "60 Years of the Armed Forces of the USSR" (1978)
Medal "Veteran of the Armed Forces of the USSR" (1976)

Foreign

Cross of Valour (Poland)
Medal of Victory and Freedom 1945 (Poland)
Medal "For Oder, Neisse and the Baltic" (Poland)
Medal "For Warsaw 1939-1945" (Poland)
Officer of the Order of the British Empire (UK)
