= Aleksey Nemkov =

Hero of the Soviet Union

Alexey Vladimirovich Nemkov
- Алексей Владимирович Немков
- Born: 30 March 1919; Dzhankoy, Crimea
- Died: 29 March 1972 (aged 52); Dzhankoy, Crimean Oblast, Ukrainian SSR, Soviet Union
- Military career
- Allegiance: Soviet Union
- Branch: Red Army
- Service years: 1939–1945
- Rank: Captain
- Unit: 37th Guards Rifle Division
- Conflicts: World War II; Berlin Offensive
- Awards: Hero of the Soviet Union

Aleksey Vladimirovich Nemkov (Russian: Алексей Владимирович Немков; 30 March 1919 – 29 March 1972) was a Red Army captain during World War II and a Hero of the Soviet Union. Nemkov was awarded the title Hero of the Soviet Union and the Order of Lenin for his actions during the Berlin Offensive.

== Early life ==
Alexey Vladimirovich Nemkov was born on 30 March 1919 in Dzhankoy in the Crimean Socialist Soviet Republic to a working-class family. He graduated from eighth grade and became the assistant secretary of the Dzhankoy branch of the Communist Party of the Soviet Union (CPSU) in 1938. Nemkov became a member of the CPSU in 1939, and was conscripted into the Red Army in October of that year.

== World War II ==
Nemkov fought in combat from September 1941. In 1943, he graduated from a company commanders' course. He became a company commander in the 118th Guards Rifle Regiment of the 37th Guards Rifle Division. During Operation Bagration, Nemkov's company reportedly advanced 300 kilometers. On 25 August, his company was reportedly first to break into German trenches during the battle for the village of Zalye. The company reportedly killed 20 German soldiers. While pursuing retreating German troops, Nemkov's company reportedly recaptured one towing vehicle and two mortars. They also captured the village of Lysaya-Gura and cut the Moscow-Warsaw highway. During the fighting for Brok on 27 August, Nemkov's company was again first to enter and cut the German retreat route. In this action, they reportedly killed 25 German soldiers. While in battle on 30 August near Poręba, Nemkov's company reportedly killed up to 18 German soldiers. He was lightly wounded in the leg but reportedly did not leave the front and continued to command. During a later action on the western bank of the Narew, Nemkov's company was among the first to attack and capture three German trenches in the village of Lubeneu. They also reportedly killed up to 15 German soldiers and captured 5 mortars, as well as one towing vehicle. By September 1944, he had reportedly killed ten German soldiers during the offensive. He had also been wounded twice. On 23 October 1944, he was awarded the Order of the Red Star for his actions during the offensive. Nemkov was awarded the Order of the Red Banner on the next day for his leadership during the fighting at Zalye, Brok, Poreba and the western bank of the Narew.

By March 1945, Nemkov was a battalion commander in the 118th Guards Rifle Regiment of the 37th Guards Rifle Division. The division fought in the capture of Danzig in late March. On 27 March, German troops launched counterattacks and were reportedly repulsed eleven times by Nemkov's battalion. Due to German losses, the battalion was able to break through the German lines and captured several districts in Danzig. During the fighting in Danzig from 23 to 28 March, Nemkov's battalion reportedly killed 215 and captured 130 German troops. On 20 April during the Berlin Offensive, he led an assault team across the Oder on rubber boats. Under heavy German fire, they crossed the river near Kołbaskowo. After landing on the west bank of the Oder, Nemkov was reportedly among the first to attack the German trenches. When the battalion commander failed in his responsibilities, Nemkov replaced him in command and reportedly organized the holding of the bridgehead. He was wounded but reportedly did not leave the frontline. During the four days of fighting to hold the bridgehead, 1,000 German soldiers were reportedly killed and 15 German tanks reportedly destroyed. He was awarded the Order of Bogdan Khmelnitsky 3rd class on 16 May for his actions during the capture of Danzig. On 29 June, Nemkov was awarded the title Hero of the Soviet Union and the Order of Lenin for his actions during the Oder crossing.

== Postwar ==
After the end of World War II, Nemkov was demobilized. He lived and worked in Dzhankoy and died on 29 March 1972. Nemkov was buried in Dzhankoy.
