= Yevgeny Onopriyenko =

Russian footballer

Personal information
- Full name: Yevgeny Vladimirovich Onopriyenko
- Date of birth: 14 March 1978 (age 48)
- Height: 1.83 m (6 ft 0 in)
- Position: Midfielder

Senior career*
Years	Team	Apps	(Gls)
1999	FC Salyut-YuKOS Belgorod	26	(3)
2000	FC Salyut-Energia Belgorod (D4)		
2001–2006	FC Salyut-Energia Belgorod	173	(37)
2007	FC Gubkin	29	(4)
2008	FC Volga Tver	9	(0)
2009	FC Zenit Penza (D4)		
2010	FC Zenit Penza	28	(5)
2011–2012	FC KUZBASS Kemerovo	35	(1)
- * Club domestic league appearances and goals

Yevgeny Vladimirovich Onopriyenko (Russian: Евгений Владимирович Оноприенко; born 14 March 1978) is a former professional association football player from Russia.

== Club career ==
He played in the Russian Football National League for FC Salyut-Energia Belgorod in 2006.
