= 37th Guards Rifle Division =

Soviet Red Army formation

- Active: 1942–1945
- Country: Soviet Union
- Branch: Red Army
- Type: Infantry
- Size: Division
- Engagements: World War II: Battle of Stalingrad; Operation Kutuzov; Battle of the Dnieper; Bobruysk Offensive; East Pomeranian Offensive
- Decorations: Order of the Red Banner (2); Order of Kutuzov; Order of Suvorov; Order of Bogdan Khmelnitsky
- Battle honours: Rechitsa

Commanders
- Notable commanders: Viktor Zholudev; Sobir Rakhimov; Kuzma Grebennik

The 37th Guards Rechitsa, twice Red Banner, Orders of Suvorov, Kutuzov, and Bogdan Khmelnitsky Rifle Division (Russian: 37-я гвардейская стрелковая Речицкая дважды Краснознамённая орденов Суворова, Кутузова и Богдана Хмельницкого дивизия) was an infantry division of the Red Army which fought during World War II.

The division was formed on 2 August 1942 from the 1st Airborne Corps in Lyubertsy, near Moscow. Its most famous action was the defense of the Stalingrad Tractor Factory during the Battle of Stalingrad. The division was highly decorated, receiving two Orders of the Red Banner, the Order of Suvorov 1st class, the Order of Kutuzov 1st class and the Order of Bogdan Khmelnitsky. It became the 27th Guards Mechanised Division in December 1945 and on 20 April 1957 the 39th Guards Tank Division at Polotsk (Borovukha), Vitebsk Oblast, Belorussian Military District. On 1 January 1965 it became the 37th Guards Tank Division, staying within 7th Tank Army for the duration. In 1992 it became part of the Belarus Ground Forces. The tank division was converted to the 37th Separate Guards Mechanized Brigade, which was disbanded in fall 2011. The division's successor, with an unbroken lineage, is the 37th Weapons and Equipment Storage Base of the North Western Operational Command at Polotsk.

== History ==
The 37th Guards Rifle Division was formed on the basis of the personnel of the 1st Airborne Corps at Lyubertsy on 2 August 1942. The 1st Airborne Brigade became the 109th Guards Rifle Regiment, the 204th Airborne Brigade became the 114th Guards Rifle Regiment and the 211th Airborne Brigade became the 118th Guards Rifle Regiment.

=== Stalingrad ===
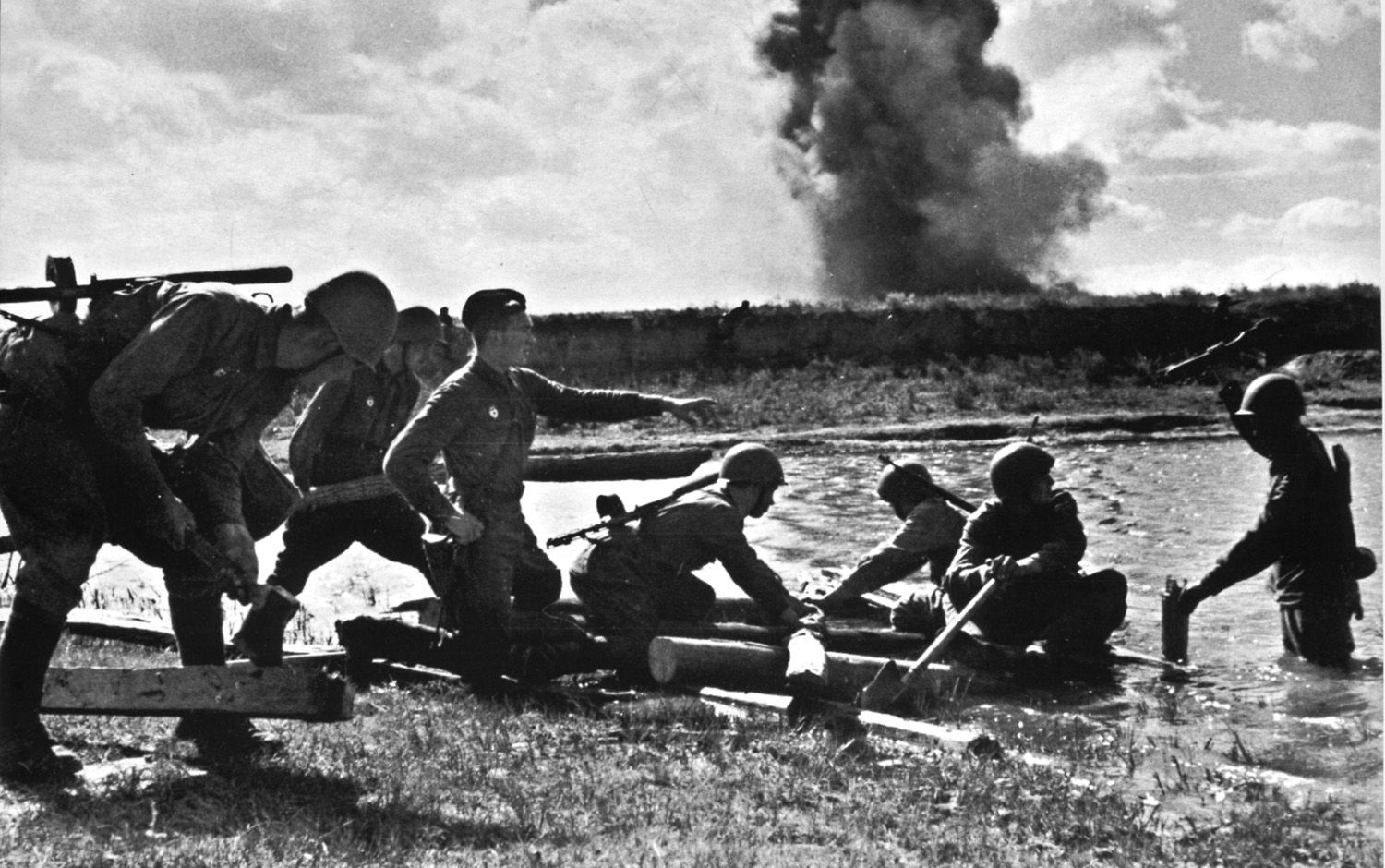
Sappers of the division's 39th Separate Guards Sapper Battalion building a crossing in the vicinity of Stalingrad, 25 September 1942

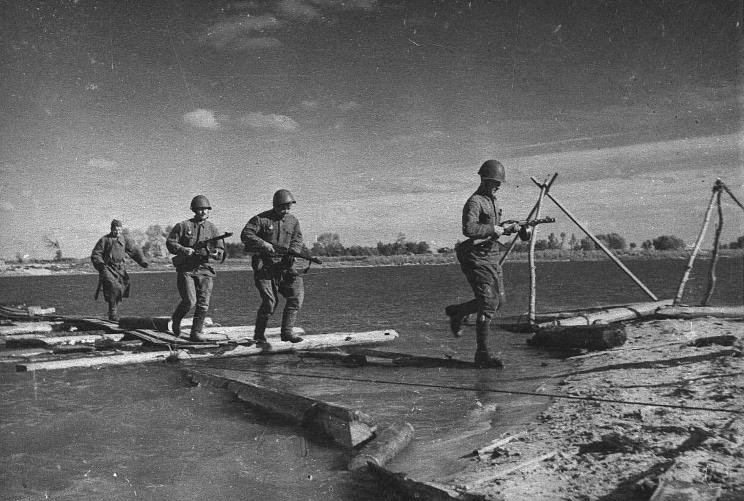
Soldiers of Lieutenant Yevgeny Aleksandrovich Ondrin's platoon of the 109th Guards Rifle Regiment crossing the Don, 25 September 1942

The division was sent to the Stalingrad Front and became part of the 4th Tank Army on 10 August. On the night of 14 August, the division was unloaded from trains at Ilovlya station, with the task to take defensive positions in a small bend in the Don near the village and hamlets of Trehostrovskoy and Zimoveysky, but did not have time to gain a bridgehead. Instead, the division went directly to the right bank of the river and defended that area, disrupting German attempts to cross the Don. On 18 September, elements of the division crossed the Don and established a bridgehead. The division handed over the defense of the area to the 22nd Motorized Rifle Brigade and crossed the Volga River 40 km north of Stalingrad on 28 September.

8-00: The Germans opened artillery fire, bombed our leading troops 9-00: At the walls of the Stalingrad Tractor Factory (STZ) burn 10 enemy tanks 10-00: 109th Guards crushed by tanks and infantry 10-00: Communication with the 114th Guards Regiment interrupted 11–15: The enemy seized the stadium STZ. Our surrounded elements (118 Regiment) are fighting in the encirclement. 12–20: From the village of STZ received a radiogram from troops of the 37th: "Surrounded. Ammunition and water there. Do not give up." 12–30: The command post of the 37th bombed. General Zholudev swamped in the dugout. Air is supplied through the pipes. 15–25: Security Headquarters of the 62nd Army clashed with broken-through enemy gunners 16–30: About 100 tanks penetrated into the territory of STZ over the positions of the 118th Guards 16–35: A radio message from the 114th Regiment commander asks for artillery fire on his own positions 21-00: A group of guardsmen of the 37th continue to fight in the shops of the plant, radioing: "Do not give up. Die For the Motherland!"

— 62nd Army records, 14 October 1942 (translated)

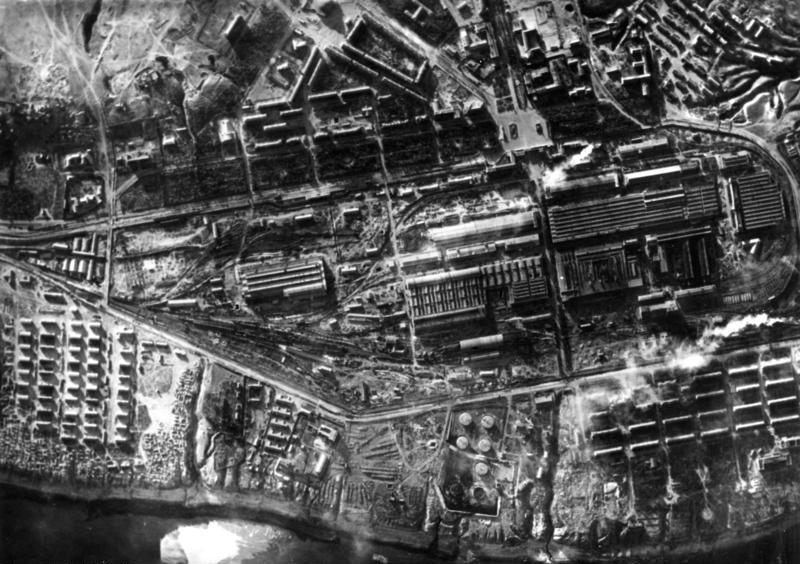
Aerial view of the Stalingrad Tractor Factory

On the night of 2 October, the division crossed back to the right bank of the Volga in Stalingrad and reached the Mokraya Mechyotka river, immediately going into combat. On 2-3 October it was recorded as having 7,000 personnel on hand (66% of shtat, establishment strength (10,670)). The intensity of the fighting can be gauged from the memoirs of a surgeon in the division, M.F. Gulyakin. Gulyakin reports that rarely were there less than 200 wounded troops per day. By 14 October the remnants of the division were surrounded in the workshops of the Stalingrad Tractor Factory. Strength was recorded on 15 October as 250, having lost roughly 6,750 soldiers in less than two weeks. The 14th Panzer Division broke through parts of the division's lines and reached the Volga. During the night of 16–17 October it was relieved by the 138th Rifle Division and sent to the Barrikady Factory, where the division set up strongpoints. In the middle of November, the division transferred to the left bank of the Volga, leaving in Stalingrad a combined unit based on the 118th Guards Rifle Regiment, subordinated to the 138th Rifle Division. After a few days, the combined unit was withdrawn due to heavy losses. The division was almost completely destroyed in the fighting for the Stalingrad Tractor Factory. Losses amounted to 95% of division personnel.

=== Sevsk Offensive ===
A Stavka directive ordered the division to withdraw from the Stalingrad Front reserves on 27 December. It was meant to board trains at the station of Zaplavnaya at 1800 on 25 December and sent to Balashov, but only departed on 31 December. On 6 February 1943, it was directed that the division be sent to the Central Front after being rebuilt to fight in the Sevsk offensive. On 17 February, the division unloaded at Yelets station. The division reportedly advanced 260 kilometers in eight days. It joined battle with German troops at Gladkoye and Veretenino. They met resistance from elements of the 137th Infantry Division but continued to advance. On the line of Chernevka, Gladkoye and Koshkino, the 137th, reinforced by the SS tanks, attempted to hold back the advance. The division captured Gladkoye, Koshkino and Studensky. During the capture of Koshkino, the 3rd Battalion of the 114th Guards Rifle Regiment was particularly distinguished. The division continued to advance and stopped at the villages of Nevar, Prudnoye and Khlebtovo. On 28 April, the division was awarded the Order of the Red Banner for its performance at Stalingrad.

=== Operation Kutuzov and the Dnieper ===
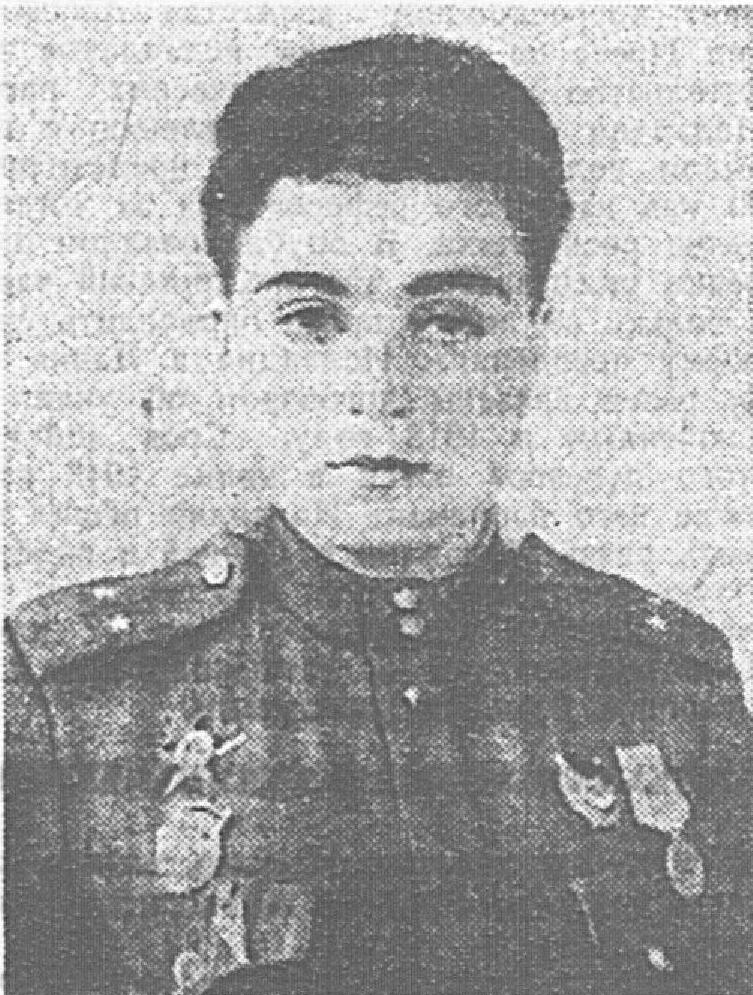
Lieutenant Ida Nukhimovna Segal, deputy company commander for political affairs of the 38th Separate Guards Medical-Sanitary Battalion, awarded the Order of the Red Star for her efforts in evacuating wounded during the Battle of Stalingrad and Sevsk offensive

The division fought in Operation Kutuzov in August as part of the 65th Army's 18th Rifle Corps. On 12 August, the division helped captured Dmitrovsk in cooperation with other units. The division then crossed the Desna River and the Sozh River in September, fighting in the Chernigov-Pripyat Offensive. It fought to expand the Sozh bridgehead until mid-October. During the offensive, telephonist Vasily Bantsekin distinguished himself, for which Bantsekin was posthumously awarded the title Hero of the Soviet Union on 15 January 1944. Machine gun company private Ivan Mokrousov also distinguished himself and was awarded the title Hero of the Soviet Union. On 20 October, the division was transferred to cross the Dnieper northwest of Loyew. 118th Guards Rifle Regiment company commander Lieutenant Vladimir Vladimirov distinguished himself during the Dnieper crossing, for which he was awarded the title Hero of the Soviet Union posthumously. 109th Guards Rifle Regiment company commander Senior Lieutenant Nikolay Shchetinin also distinguished himself and was awarded the title Hero of the Soviet Union on 15 January 1944. During November, it fought in the Gomel-Rechitsa Offensive. The division was awarded the title "Rechitsa" on 18 November for its actions during the capture of Rechitsa in conjunction with the 162nd Rifle Division. During December 1943 and January 1944, the division fought to capture southeastern Belarus. It reportedly distinguished itself in the battles near Kalinkovichi and Mazyr, for which it was awarded the Order of Suvorov 2nd class on 15 January.

=== Operation Bagration and the Narew Bridgehead ===
During Operation Bagration in the summer, the division broke through German defenses at Babruysk and helped capture Osipovichi on 28 June. The division was awarded a second Order of the Red Banner on 2 July for its actions at Babruysk. It then captured Baranovichi on 8 July and Slonim on 10 July. The division was awarded the Order of Kutuzov 1st class for its actions during the capture of Baranovichi. After the capture of Belarus, the division entered Polish territory and reached the Narew at the beginning of September. The division crossed the Narew south of Pułtusk and until January fought to hold the bridgehead.

=== East Pomeranian Offensive and the Berlin Offensive ===
On 13 January, the division attacked out of its bridgehead. By the end of January, the division had reached Graudenz and besieged the city. It was transferred to the 2nd Shock Army on 14 February. On 16 February, it attacked the city again but was unable to capture the city itself. On the night of 18 February, the division attacked again but was forced to retreat due to strong German resistance. However, these attacks had worn down the German troops to allow elements of the 142nd Rifle Division to capture the city. It returned to the control of the 65th Army on 2 March and fought in the East Pomeranian Offensive. It then advanced on Danzig and fought in the street fighting in the city. During the fight, division commander Sobir Rakhimov was killed on 26 March by a direct hit on his observation post. Major general Kuzma Grebennik took command on 30 March, replacing Colonel Nikolai Onoprienko. The division transferred westward to fight in the Berlin Offensive on 28 March. The division crossed the Oder and fought near Stettin. During the Oder crossing, 118th Guards Rifle Regiment deputy battalion commander Captain Alexey Nemkov distinguished himself and was awarded the title Hero of the Soviet Union and the Order of Lenin on 29 June. A company commander from the same regiment, Senior lieutenant Alexander Nikolayev, was awarded the title Hero of the Soviet Union and the Order of Lenin on the same day as Nemkov for distinguishing himself during the Oder crossing. By 10 May 1945 the division was part of 18th Rifle Corps, 65th Army. By the end of the war, the division had reached Rostock. On 4 June, the division was awarded the Order of Bogdan Khmelnitsky 2nd class for its actions during the Berlin offensive. In total, seventeen soldiers of the division received the title Hero of the Soviet Union during the war.

=== Postwar ===
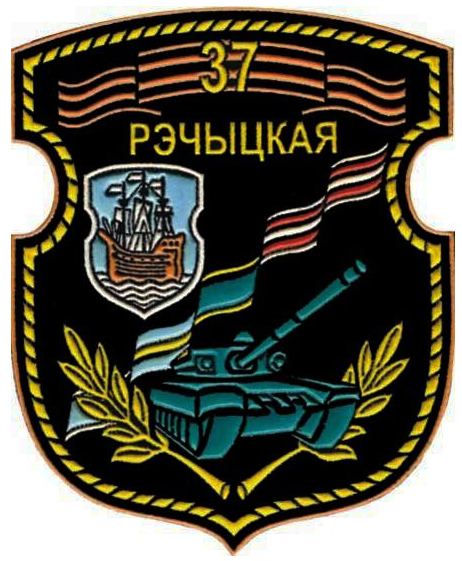
Patch of the 37th Guards Weapons and Equipment Storage Base

On 1 December 1945, the division was converted into the 27th Guards Mechanized Division in the area of Strzegom and Świebodzice as part of the 7th Mechanized Army. It was reduced to a regiment on 1 December 1946 when the army was downsized to a cadre division and in 1948 relocated to Polotsk. The 27th Guards became a division again on 30 October 1949 when the army was restored to its former strength. On 20 May 1957, it was converted to the 39th Guards Tank Division. On 11 January 1965, it was renamed the 37th Guards Tank Division. Between September and November 1964, the division conducted trials on Objet 432 initial production models of the T-64 tank. During the Cold War, the division was maintained at 25% strength. The division participated in the Zapad-81 exercise, and was involved in trials of the new T-72 tank and the Manevr, the first Soviet automated command and control system. Personnel of the division's four tank battalions fought in the Soviet–Afghan War, in which 28 were killed. The 261st Tank Regiment was replaced by the 38th Guards Tank Regiment of the 34th Tank Division and the 936th Anti-Aircraft Missile Regiment was replaced by the 740th from the 3rd Guards Tank Division in November 1989. In March 1992, the division was taken over by Belarus. It was downsized and became a weapons and equipment storage base in April 1993, then the 37th Separate Guards Mechanized Brigade by 2005, when the 30th Separate Mechanized Battalion joined the brigade. The 37th Brigade was disbanded in the fall of 2011, and the 30th Battalion transferred to the 19th Guards Mechanized Brigade. The brigade became the 37th Weapons and Equipment Storage Base, part of the Belorussian Northwestern Operational Command.

== Commanders ==
Division commanders included:

- Major General Viktor Zholudev (6 August 1942 – 8 April 1943)
- Colonel Timofey Naumovich Wisniewski (9 April – 7 June 1943)
- Colonel (promoted to Major General 25 September 1943) Evgeny Grigoryevich Ushakov (8 June 1943 – 29 April 1944)
- Colonel Ivan Brushko (November 1943)
- Major General Josef Sankowski (November 1943)
- Colonel (promoted to Major General 2 November 1944) Vasily Lavrentyevich Morozov (30 April – 15 November 1944)
- Major General Sobir Rakhimov (16 November 1944 – 26 March 1945) KIA
- Colonel Nikolai Onoprienko (28–29 March 1945)
- Major General Kuzma Grebennik (30 March – April 1947)
- Colonel Vladimir Iosifovich Yevsyukov (November 1957–July 1960)
- Colonel Fyodor Andreyevich Rudskoy (March 1963–June 1967)
- Anatoly Vasilyevich Sedykh (1970–1973)
- Mikhail Moiseyevich Loveykin (April 1992–August 1993)

== Composition ==
The 37th Guards Rifle Division was composed of the following units.

- 109th Guards Rifle Regiment
- 114th Guards Rifle Regiment
- 118th Guards Rifle Regiment
- 86th Guards Artillery Regiment
- 42nd Guards Separate Antitank Battalion
- 50th Guards Antiaircraft Battery (up to 15 April 1943)
- 40th Guards Separate Reconnaissance Company
- 39th Guards Sapper Battalion

In 1988, the 37th Guards Tank Division included the following units.

- 252nd Tank Regiment
- 261st Tank Regiment
- 263rd Guards Tank Regiment
- 298th Guards Motorized Rifle Regiment
- 854th Guards Artillery Regiment
- 936th Antiaircraft Missile Regiment
- 199th Separate Missile Battalion
- 55th Separate Reconnaissance Battalion
- 359th Separate Guards Engineer-Sapper Battalion
- 63rd Separate Guards Communications Battalion
- Separate Chemical Defence Company
- Separate Medical Battalion
- 1020th Separate Material Supply Battalion
