= Serdobsky Uyezd =

Serdobsky Uyezd (Сердобский уезд) was one of the subdivisions of the Saratov Governorate of the Russian Empire. It was situated in the northwestern part of the governorate. Its administrative centre was Serdobsk.

== Demographics ==
At the time of the Russian Empire Census of 1897, Serdobsky Uyezd had a population of 224,782. Of these, 99.7% spoke Russian, 0.1% German and 0.1% Tatar as their native language.
