= Valentin Onoprienko =

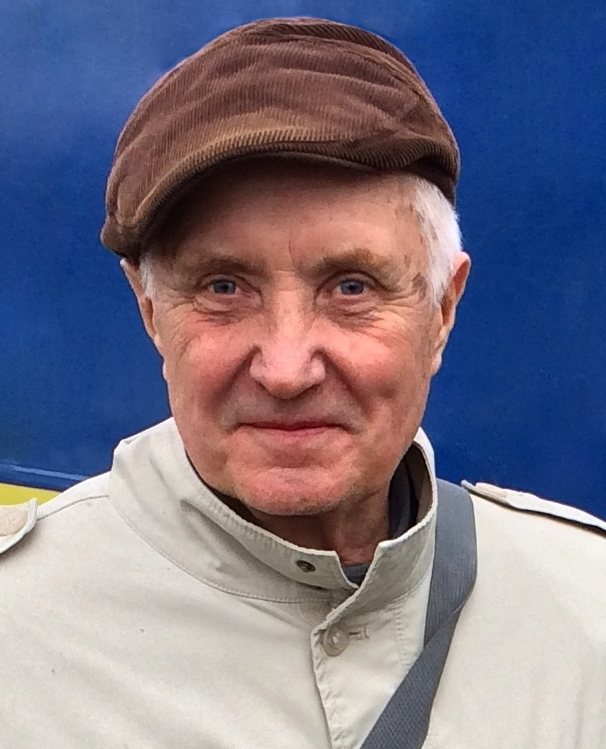
- Born: 2 April 1939; Aldan, USSR
- Known for: History of scienses papers
- Scientific career
- Fields: History of geology, History of biology

Valentin Ivanovich Onoprienko (born 2 April 1939, Aldan, Yakutia, USSR) is a Soviet and Ukrainian geologist, historian of science, and philosopher. He holds a Doctor of Philosophical Sciences (1982) and is a Professor (1992). He served as Head of the Department of Methodology and Sociology of Science (1992–2015) and has been a Leading Research Fellow (since 2015) at the H.M. Dobrov Institute for Scientific and Technological Potential and Science History Studies of the National Academy of Sciences of Ukraine. He is a member of the Scientific Council of the State Fund for Fundamental Research of Ukraine, the editorial board of the international journal Science and Science Studies, the Academy of Sciences of the Higher School of Ukraine, and the Academy of Construction of Ukraine. He is the author of over 470 scientific works, including 52 books: monographs, textbooks, and popular science publications.

== Biography ==
Born on 2 April 1939, in Aldan, in the family of Ivan Grigoryevich Onoprienko (1915–2001).

He began working at the age of 16 and graduated from evening school with a gold medal (1957).

In 1963, he graduated from the Faculty of Geology, Moscow State University. In 1966, he completed his postgraduate studies at the Department of Philosophy of Science at Moscow State University.

He worked at the Institute of Geology of the Karelian Branch of the USSR Academy of Sciences (1962–1963), the Kyiv Polytechnic Institute (1964–1975), and the Sector of History of Natural Science and Technology at the Institute of History of the Ukrainian SSR Academy of Sciences (1975–1986). Since 1986, he has been affiliated with the Center (now Institute) for Research on Scientific and Technical Potential and History of Science named after H.M. Dobrov of the National Academy of Sciences of Ukraine.

In the 1960s, he collaborated with academician A.S. Povarinykh (1915–1986) and Professor S.A. Moroz on methodological problems in geology and publishing.

In the 1980s, he conducted research on the methodology of geological cartography, stratigraphy, geochronology, and mineralogy (monographs: Methodology and Conceptual Basis of Geochronology, 1984, co-authored with K.V. Simakov and A.N. Dmitriev; Mineralogy: Past, Present, Future, 1986, with A.S. Povarinykh; Fundamentals of Geological Cartography, 1987, with V.Yu. Zabrodin and V.A. Solovyov; Spatial-Temporal Aspects of Stratigraphy, 1988, with S.A. Moroz).

In 1986, he headed the Department of History of Technology at the newly established H.M. Dobrov Center for Research on Scientific and Technical Potential and History of Science of the National Academy of Sciences of Ukraine. He served as the Party organizer of the center. Under his leadership, collective monographs were prepared, including Inorganic Materials Science, Development of Construction Science and Technology (3 volumes), and Creators of New Technology in the Ukrainian SSR (1991), as well as the monograph by V.I. Onoprienko and T.A. Shcherban, Formation of Higher Technical Education (1990). During this period, he also worked on collecting, systematizing, and interpreting archival materials on the history of the National Academy of Sciences of Ukraine, reflected in his publications and the collective monograph History of the Academy of Sciences of Ukraine: 1918–1993 (1993). The first textbook on the history of Ukrainian science (History of Ukrainian Science: 19th–20th Centuries) won the competition "Transformation of Humanitarian Education in Ukraine."

In 1992, V.I. Onoprienko headed the Department of Methodology and Sociology of Science at the center. His works on the sociology of science include collective and individual monographs such as The Scientific Community: Introduction to the Sociology of Science (1998), Methodological Issues of Science Studies (2001), and Science Studies: The Search for Systemic Ideas (2008).

In the Scientific-Biographical Series of the Russian Academy of Sciences, he published over ten books, including:

- Feodosy Nikolaevich Chernyshev (1985, with Yu.A. Anisimov)
- Pavel Apollonovich Tutkovsky (1987)
- Nikolai Ivanovich Andrusov (1990)
- Gennady Danilovich Romanovsky (1995)
- The Florenskys (2000)
- Boris Borisovich Golitsyn (2002)
- Alexander Sergeyevich Povarinykh (2004, with M.V. Onoprienko)
- Vladimir Ivanovich Luchitsky (2004)
- Kirill Vladimirovich Simakov (2006)
- The Chirvinskys (2008, with M.V. Onoprienko).

Additionally, he authored books on Yevgeny Oskarovich Paton (1988, with L.D. Kisterskaya and P.I. Sevbo) and Vladimir Ivanovich Luchitsky (1991). He also wrote popular science books, such as:

- Geological Calendar (1977, with K.V. Simakov)
- The Call of the High Latitudes: Northern Expeditions of F.N. Chernyshev (1989)
- Geologists in the Far North (1990).

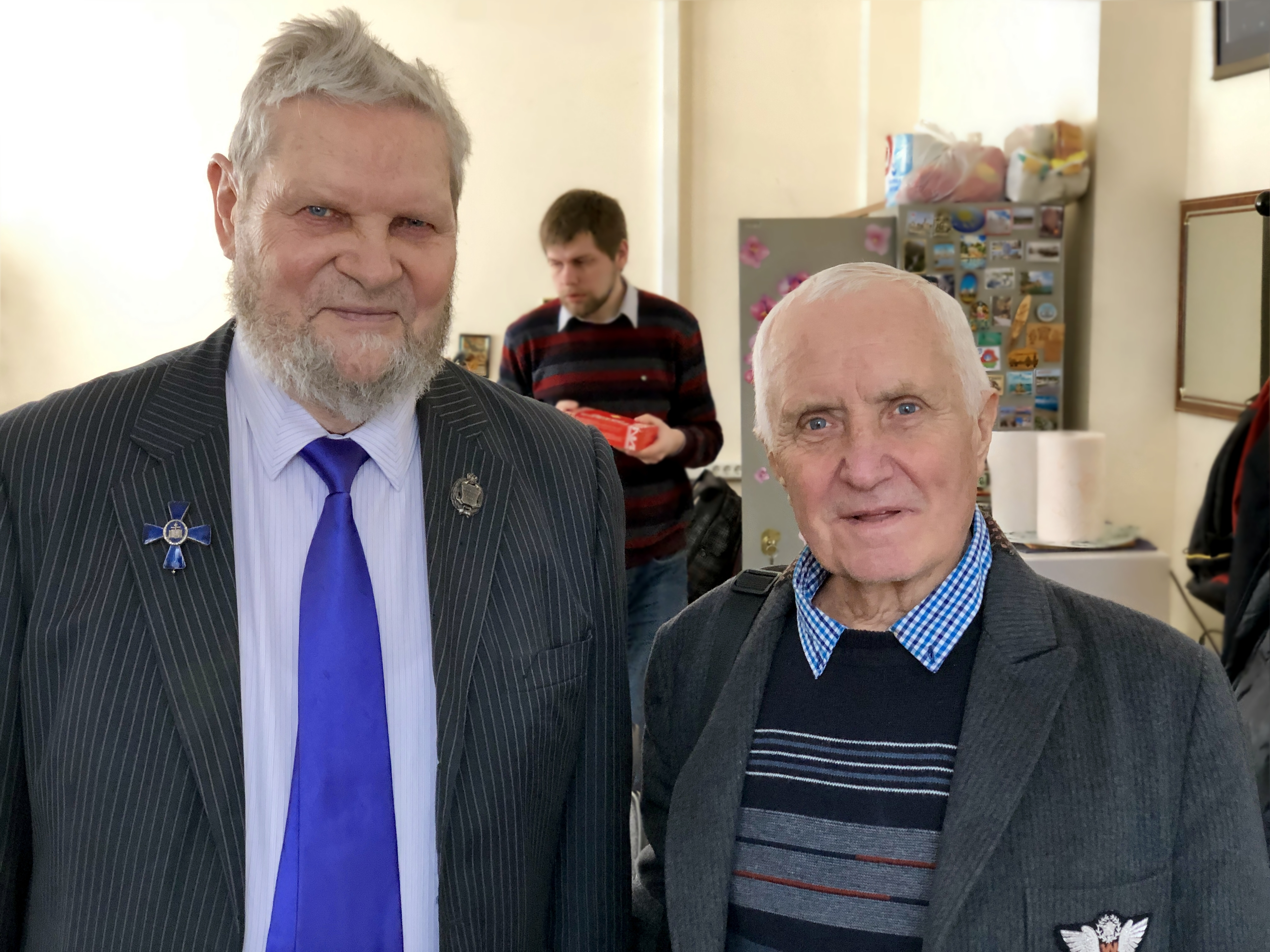
At the S.I. Vavilov Institute for the History of Science and Technology RAS in 2019

In recent years, he has published:

- V.I. Vernadsky: Science. Philosophy. Man (with I.I. Mochalov)
- The Chirvinskys (with M.V. Onoprienko)
- Sources on the History of the Ukrainian Scientific Society in Kyiv (with T.O. Shcherban).

In 1997, at the International Congress of the History of Science (Liège, Belgium), the National Committee of Historians of Science of Ukraine was admitted to the International Union of History and Philosophy of Science, with V.I. Onoprienko appointed as its president. One of the committee's achievements was the publication of the collective monograph Tartu University and Ukraine (2004).

While working at the National Academy of Sciences of Ukraine, he continued teaching at universities, including Moscow State University, Kyiv Polytechnic Institute, Taras Shevchenko National University of Kyiv, Kyiv National University of Culture and Arts, Kyiv National Linguistic University, National Aviation University, and the Center for Humanities Education of the NAS of Ukraine. He authored numerous textbooks and teaching aids.

For many years, he has been a member of specialized councils for defending doctoral dissertations at the H.S. Skovoroda Institute of Philosophy of the National Academy of Sciences of Ukraine and the H.M. Dobrov Center for Research on Scientific and Technical Potential and History of Science. He served for four years on the expert commission of the Higher Attestation Commission of Ukraine for historical sciences. Under his supervision, 14 postgraduate students defended their candidate (Ph.D.) dissertations, and three defended their doctoral dissertations in philosophy and history.

== Family ==
- Brother — Yuri (1941–2017) — Soviet and Russian paleontologist and stratigrapher, professor.

== Awards and honors ==
- — Silver Medal of the Russian Academy of Sciences named after Academician Alexander Yanshin — for contributions to scientific biography.
- 2012 — NAS of Ukraine Prize named after Mykhailo Hrushevsky — for contributions to the study of Ukrainian science history (jointly with V.V. Tkachenko).

== Bibliography ==
Author of numerous articles and monographs on the history of science, including:

- Onoprienko V.I., Simakov K.V. Geological Calendar. Kyiv: Naukova Dumka, 1977. 152 p.
- Zubkov I.F., Parnyuk M.A., Onoprienko V.I. et al. Social, Epistemological, and Methodological Problems of Geological Sciences. Kyiv: Naukova Dumka, 1979. 344 p.
- Onoprienko V.I. The Nature of Geological Research. Kyiv: Naukova Dumka, 1981. 160 p.
- Onoprienko V.I., Simakov K.V., Meyen S.V. et al. The Development of the Concept of Time in Geology. Kyiv: Naukova Dumka, 1982. 414 p.
- Onoprienko V.I., Simakov K.V., Dmitriev A.N. Methodology and Conceptual Basis of Geochronology. Kyiv: Naukova Dumka, 1984. 128 p.
- Povarinykh A.S., Onoprienko V.I. Mineralogy: Past, Present, Future. Kyiv: Naukova Dumka, 1985. 160 p.
- Moroz S.A., Onoprienko V.I. Methodology of Geological Science. Kyiv: Vyshcha Shkola, 1985. 200 p.
- Anisimov Yu.A., Onoprienko V.I. Feodosy Nikolaevich Chernyshev. Moscow: Nauka, 1985. 304 p. (Scientific-Biographical Series).
- Zabrodin V.Yu., Solovyov V.A., Onoprienko V.I. Fundamentals of Geological Cartography. Novosibirsk: Nauka, 1987. 230 p.
- Onoprienko V.I., Kisterskaya L.D., Sevbo P.I. Yevgeny Oskarovich Paton. Kyiv: Naukova Dumka, 1988. 240 p.
- Moroz S.A., Onoprienko V.I. Spatial-Temporal Aspects of Stratigraphy. Kyiv: Vyshcha Shkola, 1988. 240 p.
- Onoprienko V.I. The Call of the High Latitudes: Northern Expeditions of F.N. Chernyshev. Moscow: Mysl, 1989. 221 p.
- Onoprienko V.I., Shcherban T.A. The Formation of Higher Technical Education in Ukraine. Kyiv: Naukova Dumka, 1990. 140 p.
- Onoprienko V.I. Geologists in the Far North. Moscow: Nedra, 1990. 140 p.
- Onoprienko V.I. Vladimir Ivanovich Luchitsky. Kyiv: Naukova Dumka, 1991. 192 p.
- Onoprienko V.I., Shcherban T.A., Lugovsky A.G. et al. Creators of New Technology in the Ukrainian SSR. Kyiv: Naukova Dumka, 1991. 176 p.
- Moroz S.A., Onoprienko V.I. Geological Cartography. Kyiv: Kyiv University, 1991. 78 p.
- Onoprienko V.I. Gennady Danilovich Romanovsky. Moscow: Nauka, 1995. 170 p. (Scientific-Biographical Series).
- Malitsky B.A., Nadiradze A.N., Onoprienko V.I. et al. Transformation of Academic Institutes: Documentary Analysis and Sociological Assessments // Development of Science and Scientific-Technical Potential in Ukraine and Abroad. Issue 2 (10). Kyiv, 1996. 120 p.
- Moroz S.A., Onoprienko V.I., Bortnik S.Yu. Methodology of Geographical Science: A Textbook. Kyiv: Zapovit, 1997. 333 p.
- Onoprienko V.I. History of Ukrainian Science: A Textbook. Kyiv: Lybid, 1998. 304 p.
- Onoprienko V.I. The Scientific Community: Introduction to the Sociology of Science. Kyiv, 1998. 99 p.
- Onoprienko V., Reyent O., Shcherban T. The Ukrainian Scientific Society: 1907–1921. Kyiv, 1998. 242 p.
- Korobchenko A.A., Onoprienko V.I., Pylypchuk O.Ya. et al. From the History of Ukrainian Science and Technology: A Reader. Kyiv: Academy of Sciences of the Higher School of Ukraine, 1999. 171 p.
- Onoprienko V.I. The Florenskys. Moscow: Nauka, 2000. 349 p. (Scientific-Biographical Series).
- Onoprienko V.I. Boris Borisovich Golitsyn. 1862–1916. Moscow: Nauka, 2002. 335 p. (Scientific-Biographical Series).
- Onoprienko V., Romanenko Yu., Zhuravel V., Pozdnyakov V., Dzyuba V. Law in the Modern World. Kyiv, 2002. 290 p.
- Onoprienko V.I., Onoprienko M.V. Alexander Sergeyevich Povarinykh. Moscow: Nauka, 2004. 330 p. (Scientific-Biographical Series).
- Onoprienko V.I. Vladimir Ivanovich Luchitsky. Moscow: Nauka, 2004. 270 p. (Scientific-Biographical Series).
- Onoprienko V.I. Kirill Vladimirovich Simakov. Moscow: Nauka, 2006. 295 p. (Scientific-Biographical Series).
- Dyachuk I., Onoprienko V. Cosmism as a Philosophical and Scientific Trend. Kyiv: Sofiya-Oranta, 2006. 228 p.
- Drotyanko L.H., Onoprienko V.I. et al. Philosophy: A Practical Guide. Kyiv: NAU, 2006. 232 p.
- Drotyanko L.H., Onoprienko V.I. Philosophy: Methodological Materials and Programs for Candidate Exams. Kyiv: NAU, 2007. 84 p.
- Mochalov I.I., Onoprienko V.I. V.I. Vernadsky: Science. Philosophy. Man. Book 1. Science in Historical and Social Contexts. Moscow: IIET RAS, 2008. 408 p.
- Onoprienko V.I. Science Studies: The Search for Systemic Ideas. Kyiv: Analyst-Inform, 2008. 288 p.
- Onoprienko V.I., Onoprienko M.V. The Chirvinskys. Moscow: Nauka, 2008. 298 p. (Scientific-Biographical Series).
- Onoprienko V.I., Shcherban T.O. Sources on the History of the Ukrainian Scientific Society in Kyiv. Kyiv: Analyst-Inform, 2008. 352 p.
- Drotyanko L.H., Matyukhina O.A., Onoprienko V.I. et al. Philosophy: A Reader. Kyiv: National Aviation University, 2009. 244 p.
- Onoprienko V.I. Yuri Alexandrovich Bilibin. Kyiv: Informational-Analytical Agency, 2010. 256 p. (Scientific-Biographical Series).
- Kulish Ye.A., Onoprienko V.I. From the History of Liberating Domestic Industry from Mineral Imports. Kyiv: Informational-Analytical Agency, 2010. 80 p.
- Onoprienko V.I. The Age of Yanshin. Kyiv: Informational-Analytical Agency, 2011. 406 p.
- Paton B.Ye., Onoprienko V.I., Khramov Yu.A. et al. M.V. Keldysh and Ukrainian Science. Kyiv: Academperiodika, 2011. 272 p.
- Onoprienko V.I. Science as a Vocation: A Book of Interviews. Kyiv: Informational-Analytical Agency, 2011. 411 p.
- Mochalov I.I., Onoprienko V.I. V.I. Vernadsky: Science. Philosophy. Man. On the 150th Anniversary of V.I. Vernadsky. Book 1. Science in Historical and Social Contexts. 2nd ed., rev. Kyiv: Informational-Analytical Agency, 2011. 411 p.
- Onoprienko V.I., Tkachenko V.V. History of Ukrainian Science: A Course of Lectures. Kyiv: Varta, 2011. 652 p.
- Garetsky R.G., Onoprienko V.I. Gavriil Ivanovich Goretsky. 1900–1988. Kyiv: Informational-Analytical Agency, 2012. 545 p. (Scientific-Biographical Series).
- Onoprienko V.I. Geologists in the Far North. 2nd ed. Kyiv: Informational-Analytical Agency, 2012. 339 p.
- Onoprienko V.I. Mineralogy: Excursions into the Past and Future. Kyiv: Informational-Analytical Agency, 2012. 290 p.
- Mochalov I.I., Onoprienko V.I. V.I. Vernadsky: Science. Philosophy. Man. Book 2. Science and Its Tools: Logical-Methodological Aspects. Kyiv: Informational-Analytical Agency, 2012. 631 p.
- Onoprienko V.I., Rudaya S.P. Letters from Ya.V. Samoilov to V.I. Vernadsky. Kyiv: Informational-Analytical Agency, 2012. 380 p.
- Onoprienko V.I. Nikolai Ivanovich Andrusov: 1861–1924. 2nd ed., rev. Kyiv: Informational-Analytical Agency, 2013. 311 p. (Scientific-Biographical Series).
- Onoprienko V.I. Uppsala University: Centuries of History. Achievements. Personalities. Kyiv: Informational-Analytical Agency, 2014. 192 p.
- Onoprienko V.I. V.I. Vernadsky: Schools and Students. Kyiv: Informational-Analytical Agency, 2014. 331 p.
- Onoprienko V.I., Onoprienko M.V. History, Philosophy, and Sociology of Science and Technology. Kyiv: Informational-Analytical Agency, 2014. 447 p.
- Drotyanko L.H., Matyukhina O.A., Onoprienko V.I. et al. Philosophy: A Textbook. Kyiv: National Aviation University, 2014. 720 p.
- Onoprienko, V.I. (2017). Nikolai Barbot de Marny: A Russian Traveling Geologist. Saarbrücken: Lambert Academic Publishing. p. 374. ISBN 978-3-330-04323-7.
- Onoprienko V., Ivanov I. et al. Dmitry Mushketov: Contributions to International Cooperation in Geological Sciences // Studies in the History and Philosophy of Science and Technology. 2020. Vol. 29. No. 2. Pp. 42–53.
