= 3rd Airborne Corps =

3rd Airborne Corps 87th Rifle Division (II)
- Active: 1941–1942
- Country: Soviet Union
- Branch: Soviet Airborne Troops
- Engagements: World War II

Commanders
- Notable commanders: Vasili Glazunov

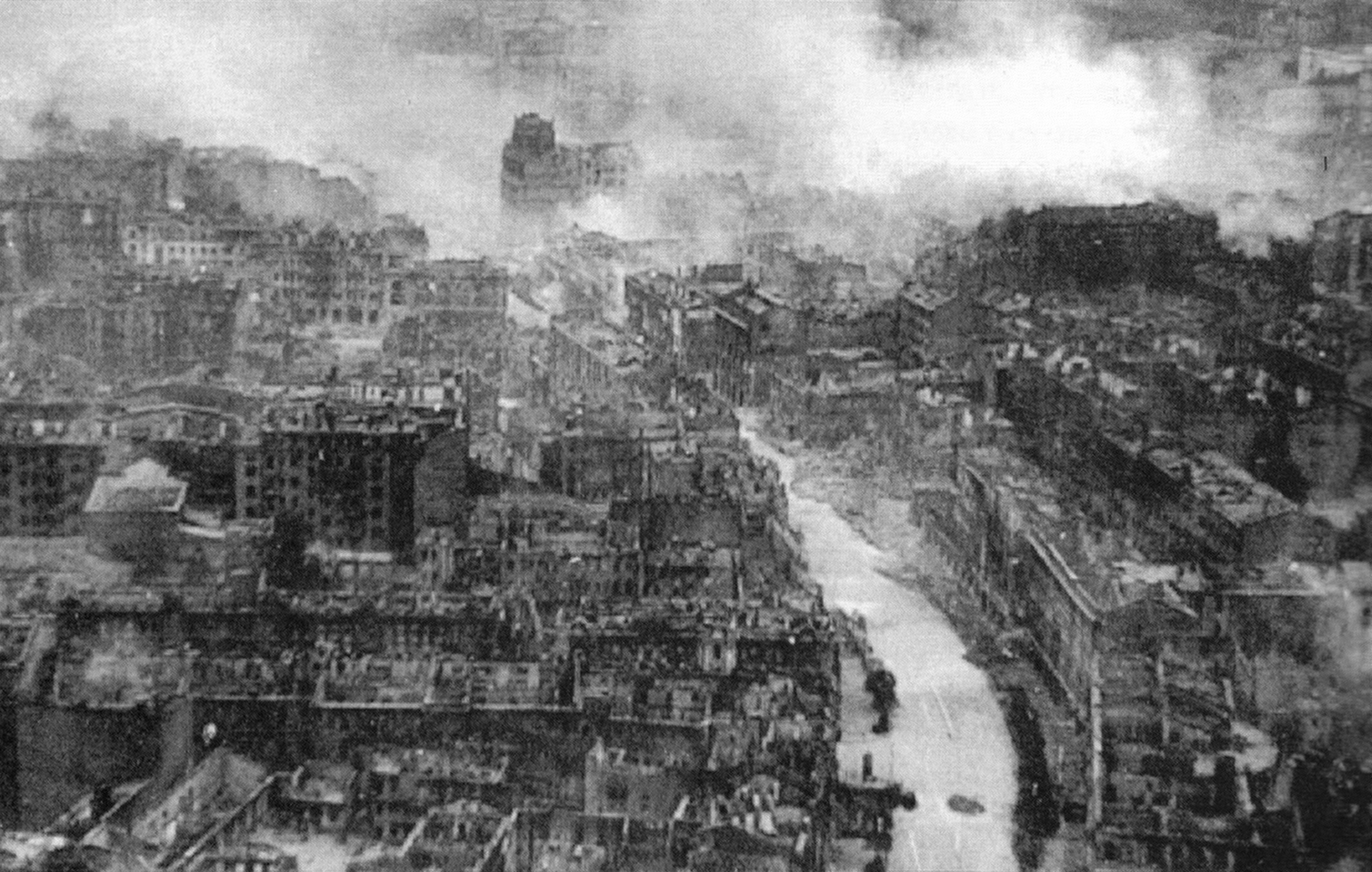
Ruined Kyiv during bombings of World War II.

The 3rd Airborne Corps was an airborne corps of the Red Army in World War II. The corps was established near Kyiv.

== History ==
Formation of the corps began in spring 1941 in the Odessa Military District, with headquarters and the main part of the corps at Pervomaysk and the 212th Airborne Brigade at Voznesensk. In the first half of August 1941 the corps fought as infantry in the Battle of Kiev and suffered heavy losses. On 29 August, its commander, Vasili Glazunov, was appointed commander of the Soviet airborne. At the beginning of September, it fought in the defense of Konotop. In November 1941, the corps was reorganized as the 87th Rifle Division (second formation), under Colonel Alexander Rodimtsev, former commander of the 5th Airborne Brigade.

The 87th Rifle Division was assigned to the 40th Army. On December 4 the Germans broke through the defensive front of the 40th Army, and building on the success in the north-east, occupied Prilepa and several other localities. The division was tasked to close the breach.

On the morning of December 8 the enemy resumed the offensive on the Kursk-Kastornoye direction. The commander of the 40th army set the division the task to provide cover in the occupied positions, regroup and come out on foot to the area Serebryanka-Tretyakov-Athanasian to stop the fight in the counter offensive of the Germans. Then it had to, in cooperation with other parts to crush in settlements Leninsky and transhipments opposing enemy force and immediately capture the city and Cheremisinovo Shchigry. After 40 km, the division was able to focus in a given area only in the evening on 10 December. The morning of 11 December, she attacked the German positions and captured two villages.

On 22 December, the division attacked in conjunction with the 1st Guards Rifle Division and 2nd Guards Rifle Division and captured Marmyzhi. On 24 December, elements of the 87th fought in the villages of Inanovka Pozhidaevka and Krasnaya Polyana. By the end of 27 December, the division was in the area of the villages of Plahovka, Golovinovka and Petrovka. In the first half of January 1942, the division conducted defensive operations in the area. On 16 January, the German troops attacked but were unable to break through. On 18 January, the division attacked in the direction of Kryukovo-Rusakova and to capture the eastern outskirts of Shchigry. The division was ordered to be converted into the 13th Guards Rifle Division on 19 January for its actions during these battles. The new numbering was officially awarded on 4 March 1942.

== Composition ==
In spring 1941, the corps was composed of the following units.

- Headquarters
- 5th Airborne Brigade (commander - Colonel Alexander Rodimtsev)
- 6th Airborne Brigade (commander - Colonel Viktor Zholudev)
- 212th Airborne Brigade (commander - Colonel Ivan Zatevakhin)
- 4th Separate Tank Battalion
- Separate anti-aircraft artillery battalion
- logistics units

In addition, it was suggested that the 719th Airfield Support Battalion and the 250th and 327th Air Assault Bomber Aviation Regiments, intended for paradropping personnel, be included in the corps. However, due to the outbreak of the Operation Barbarossa, these units did not join the corps.

== Commanders ==
- Major General Vasili Glazunov (23 June 1941 – 29 August 1941) - appointed at Pervomaisk
- Colonel Nikolai Grigorevich Travnikov (September 1941 – March 1942)
- Colonel Fedor Alexandrovich Afanasev (February – July 1942).
