= Vladimir Fedorovich Vladimirov =

Hero of the Soviet Union

- Владимир Фёдорович Владимиров
- Born: 9 July 1914; Golovino village, Moscow Governorate, Russian Empire
- Died: December 1943 (aged 29) near Rechitsa, Gomel Region, Belorussian SSR, Soviet Union
- Military career
- Allegiance: Soviet Union
- Branch: Red Army
- Service years: 1941–1943
- Rank: Lieutenant
- Unit: 37th Guards Rifle Division
- Conflicts: World War II; Battle of the Dnieper
- Awards: Hero of the Soviet Union; Order of Lenin; Order of the Red Banner; Order of Alexander Nevsky

Vladimir Fedorovich Vladimirov (Russian: Влади́мир Фёдорович Влади́миров; 9 July 1914 – December 1943) was a Red Army Lieutenant during World War II and a Hero of the Soviet Union. He was posthumously awarded the title Hero of the Soviet Union and the Order of Lenin for his actions during the Battle of the Dnieper. Vladimirov was killed in action during December 1943.

== Early life ==
Vladimirov was born on 9 July 1914 in Golovino village (now part of Moscow) in Moscow Governorate to a working-class family. After completing primary education, Vladimirov became a worker at the Moscow Machine-Building Factory in 1930. In 1938, he became a turner in the mechanical workshops of the North River Terminal.

== World War II ==
In October 1941, Vladimirov was drafted into the Red Army. From November, he fought in the Battle of Moscow. Vladimirov graduated from courses for junior lieutenants in 1942 and became a platoon commander in the 118th Guards Rifle Regiment. After being seriously wounded in battles around Smolensk, he recovered after three months. Vladmimirov became a company commander in the same regiment. During the fall of 1943, he crossed the Desna and Sozh Rivers during the Chernigov-Pripyat Offensive. On 12 September, he helped defeat the headquarters of a German infantry regiment.

Vladimirov fought in the Battle of the Dnieper. On 21 October, he led his company across the Dnieper, pushed German infantry out of their trenches and captured a bridgehead. The company reportedly repulsed eight counterattacks and captured the villages of Isakovich and Stradubka. He was awarded the Order of Alexander Nevsky on 28 October. Vladimirov was killed in action during December 1943, probably between the 20th and 26th, while fighting near the village of Karpovka (near Rechitsa) in the Gomel Region of the Belorussian SSR. On 15 January 1944, he was posthumously awarded the title Hero of the Soviet Union and the Order of Lenin for his leadership during the Dnieper crossing.
