= Sabir Rakhimov =

Soviet Uzbek Red Army major general (1902–1945)

Sabir Umaruly Rakhimov
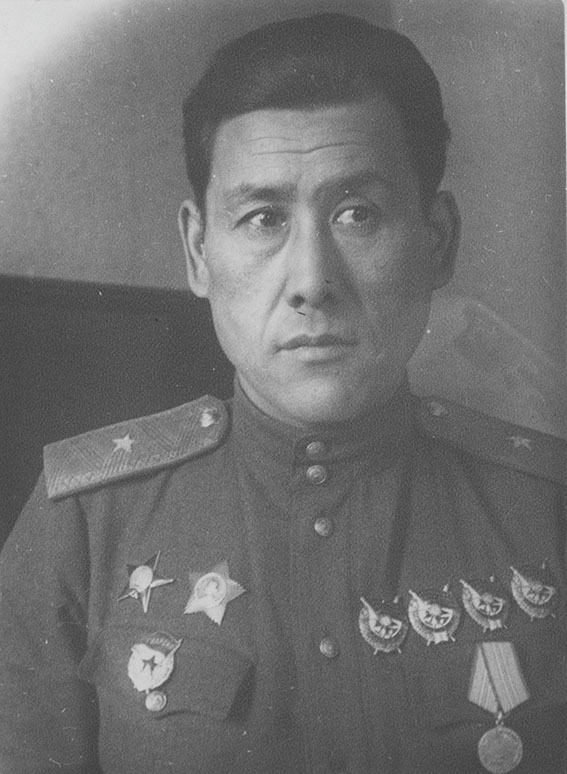
- Native name: Sobir Umar oʻgʻli Rahimov
- Nickname: Iron General
- Born: 25 January 1902; Tashkent, Syr-Darya Oblast, Russian Turkestan, Russian Empire
- Died: 26 March 1945 (aged 43) Danzig, Reichsgau Danzig-West Prussia, Nazi Germany
- Allegiance: Soviet Union
- Branch: Red Army
- Service years: 1922–1938, 1940–1945
- Rank: Major general
- Commands: 395th Rifle Division; 37th Guards Rifle Division
- Conflicts: Basmachi rebellion; World War II; Battle of the Caucasus; East Pomeranian Offensive (DOW)
- Awards: Hero of the Soviet Union

Sabir Umaruly Rakhimov (Uzbek Latin: Sobir Umar oʻgʻli Rahimov; 25 January 1902 – 26 March 1945) was a Red Army Major general and posthumous Hero of the Soviet Union. Rakhimov fought in World War II and commanded the 37th Guards Rifle Division from November 1944. Rahimov was killed by shrapnel from an artillery shell in Gdańsk during the East Pomeranian Offensive. During the Soviet period Rakhimov was considered national hero, as he was the first Red Army general officer from Uzbekistan. Metro stations, streets, schools and other places in Uzbekistan were named after Rakhimov. However, these were all renamed during 2010 and 2011 as part of a campaign by Islam Karimov to remove Soviet influence.

== Early life and prewar career ==
Sobir Rakhimov was born on 25 January 1902 in Tashkent to a working-class family; his father was an ethnic Kazakh and his mother was an ethnic Uzbek. In early childhood he was poor and spent several years in an orphanage. He became a farmworker, and later worked at a textile factory in Tashkent.

In September 1922, Rakhimov joined the Red Army, becoming a student at the Baku Joint Military School. After graduating in August 1925, he was appointed a platoon leader in the Separate Uzbek Cavalry Battalion, and held the same position in the 1st Uzbek Cavalry Regiment of the 6th Uzbek Cavalry Brigade from 1927, stationed in Samarkand. During this period, he participated in the fight to suppress the Basmachi movement. He was wounded multiple times and awarded the Order of the Red Banner. Rakhimov joined the Communist Party of the Soviet Union in 1928.

Rakhimov entered the Vystrel course in June 1930 and upon his graduation in September of that year was sent to the 41st Mountain Cavalry Regiment of the 19th Mountain Cavalry Division, stationed in the Central Asian Military District. With the regiment, he served successively as commander of the machine gun squadron, assistant regimental chief of staff, and chief of the regimental school. Rakhimov transferred to become chief of staff of the 42nd Uzbek Cavalry Regiment, stationed in Samarkand, in November 1936. During the Great Purge, Rakhimov was dismissed from the Red Army in July 1938 and imprisoned. He was released in October 1940, reinstated in the Red Army, and appointed deputy commander of the 9th Motor Rifle Regiment of the 9th Separate Tank Division, part of the Central Asian Military District at Bayramali. The division became part of the newly formed 27th Mechanized Corps in early 1941.

== World War II ==
After the beginning of Operation Barbarossa, the German invasion of the Soviet union, on 22 June 1941, the division and its corps were sent to the front. In July, the corps was broken up and the division became the 104th Separate Tank Division, with Rakhimov's unit being renamed the 104th Motor Rifle Regiment. With the 28th Army, the division fought in the Battle of Smolensk, participating in fierce fighting in the direction of Yelnya. Rakhimov was severely wounded in action near the village of Pustysheva on 1 August and was hospitalized until mid-October. He was appointed commander of the 1149th Rifle Regiment of the 353rd Rifle Division on 31 October. On 1 December, he was awarded his second Order of the Red Banner. During the winter, Rakhimov fought in battles at Rostov-on-Don and at Taganrog on the Southern Front. In January 1942, he was wounded again. After leaving the hospital in May, Rakhimov became the deputy commander of the 395th Rifle Division, and served as temporary commander of the 395th from 1 August. During the summer, he led the division in the defense of the Don River and the Kuban. On 4 September he became the division's commander and led it during the Battle of the Caucasus during the fall. During the Tuapse Defensive Operation on 15 September, Rakhimov was again wounded. During the operation from 25 September to 20 December, the 395th Rifle Division as part of the 18th Army was able to stop German troops from capturing Tuapse. In January and February 1943, the division participated in the Krasnodar Offensive during the North Caucasus Strategic Offensive. He was promoted to major general on 19 March. On 8 April, Rakhimov was removed from command and placed at the disposal of the military council of the North Caucasian Front. Placed at the disposal of the Main Personnel Directorate of the People's Commissariat of Defense from May, he was sent to Moscow to enter the accelerated course at the Vorshilov Higher Military Academy in June.

After completing the course in late April 1944, Rakhimov was again placed at the disposal of the Main Personnel Directorate and in July was sent to the 1st Belorussian Front. Upon arrival, he took over the post of deputy commander for drill parts of the 75th Guards Rifle Division of the 65th Army, with which he fought in the Lublin–Brest Offensive. In this position, Rakhimov was assessed by his superiors as "having performed at his best." As a result, on 8 September he became temporary commander of the 47th Guards Rifle Division, part of the 4th Guards Rifle Corps of the 8th Guards Army. Rakhimov transferred to command the 37th Guards Rifle Division in early November. The division fought in the East Prussian Offensive as part of the 65th Army. During the capture of Graudenz, the division broke through German lines on the outskirts of the city during 16 February. The division's attacks distracted the German garrison, allowing other divisions to capture the city on 22 February. During the East Pomeranian Offensive, the division quickly advanced 150 kilometers within a few days. The division reached the Baltic Sea coast and isolated the German troops in Danzig from those on the Vistula. The division then attacked into Danzig and fought in the street fighting for the city. Rakhimov reportedly frequently led from the front. On 26 March, his observation post suffered a direct hit from a shell fired by a German ship. Rakhimov was mortally wounded by shrapnel in the head and died eight hours later without regaining consciousness. Rakhimov was buried in Tashkent's Kafanova Park. On 6 May 1965, he was posthumously awarded the title Hero of the Soviet Union and the Order of Lenin.

== Legacy ==
Rakhimov was considered a national hero postwar in Uzbekistan. Monuments to Rakhimov was erected in Tashkent and Samarkand. In 1967, Uzbekfilm produced a film called "General Rakhimov". A metro station, district and street of Tashkent were named after him, as well as the academic lyceum at the National University of Uzbekistan. In 2010, the metro station and district in Tashkent were renamed as part of President Islam Karimov's campaign to remove Soviet influence. On 6 January 2011, the Tashkent monument was removed.

On 2 May 2018, Karimov's successor, President Shavkat Mirziyoyev announced that the monument to Rakhimov would be returned to its original place. On 9 May 2018, the monument was returned to its former place in the center of Tashkent.

== Awards and honors ==
- Hero of the Soviet Union (5 May 1965, posthumous)
- Order of Lenin (5 May 1965, posthumous)
- Order of the Red Banner, four times (1 April 1942, 13 December 1942, 14 August 1944, 3 November 1944)
- Order of Suvorov, 2nd class (8 March 1944)
- Order of Kutuzov, 2nd class (10 April 1945, posthumous)
- Order of the Red Star (30 April 1936)
- Medal "For the Defence of the Caucasus" (1944)
