= Airborne Corps (Soviet Union) =

The Soviet Airborne Troops formed a number of Airborne Corps during World War II.

== Airborne corps 22 June 1941 ==
=== Order of Battle ===
Each airborne corps was to have 8020 soldiers in total, armed with:

- 4500 semi-automatic rifles (SVT-40)
- 1257 submachine guns (PPD-40 and PPSh-41)
- 440 light machine guns (DP)
- 18 heavy machine guns
- 111 50 mm mortars
- 21 82 mm mortars
- 39 45 mm anti-tank guns
- 18 76,2 mm guns
- 50 light tanks (T-38 and T-40)
- 864 flamethrowers (ROKS)
- 241 automobiles

=== Units ===
There were five airborne corps in total.

Source soldat.ru forums.

- 1st Airborne Corps: - became 37th Guards Rifle Division in August 1942
  - Major General Matvei Usenko (23 June – October 1941)
  - Colonel, 19 January 1942 Major General Viktor Zholudev (15 December 1941 – July 1942)
- 2nd Airborne Corps: - became 32nd Guards Rifle Division in May 1942.
  - Major General Fedor Kharitonov (23 June – 9 September 1941)
  - Colonel Iosif Gubarevich (May – October 1941)
  - Colonel, since 1942 Major General Mikhail Tikhonov (September 1941 – May 1942).
- 3rd Airborne Corps
- 4th Airborne Corps
- 5th Airborne Corps: (ru:5-й воздушно-десантный корпус (СССР)) - converted to 39th Guards Rifle Division
  - Major General Ivan Bezugly (June – October 1941)
  - Colonel Stepan Guryev (3 October 1941 – August 1942)

From March to July 1942 5th Airborne Corps was in the Reserve of the Supreme High Command (Stavka reserve), training personnel, but at the beginning of August, due to the sharp deterioration of the situation in the southern sector of the Soviet-German front, the corps was immediately reformed as the 39th Guards Rifle Division (and joined the Stalingrad Front).

In the second half of 1942 under the Moscow the 5th Airborne Corps was formed again, but it did not see action, because in December 1942 it became the 7th Guards Airborne Division. This formation of the corps was commanded by Colonel Fedor Afanasev (August – November 1942) and Major General of Shore Duty Terenty Parafilo (25 November – December 1942).

== Airborne corps formed after 22 June 1941 ==
On September 4, 1941 the formation of five new airborne corps was ordered, numbered 6 to 10. Also, the establishment strength of the corps was increased to 10328 soldiers.

- 6th Airborne Corps: - converted to 40th Guards Rifle Division
  - Major General Alexander Pastrevich (October 1941 – August 1942)
  - Major General Kirzimov Alexander Ilyich (August – December 1942)
- 7th Airborne Corps:
  - Colonel, since 1942 Major General Joseph Gubarevich (October 1941 – August 1942)
  - Major General Peter Lyapin (August – December 1942).
  - The corps was formed on 5 December 1941 in the Volga Military District with the 14th, 15th, and 16th Airborne Brigades. The corps remained in the Moscow district training until 29 August 1942, when it was reformed and redesignated as the 34th Guards Rifle Division. The second formation of the 7th Airborne Corps started forming in August 1942 in the Moscow Military District with the 14th, 15th, 16th Airborne Brigade. The new 7th Airborne Corps was still forming near Moscow on 8 December 1942 when it was redesignated as the 2nd Guards Airborne Division.
- 8th Airborne Corps: - converted to 35th Guards Rifle Division
  - Colonel, 1942 Major General Vasiliy Glazkov (October 1941 – August 1942)
  - Colonel Ivan Nikitich Konev (29 August – December 1942).
- 9th Airborne Corps: - converted to 36th Guards Rifle Division
  - Major General Ivan Bezugly (October 1941 – 30 March 1942. "[F]or the use of combat aircraft for personal purposes, the non-fulfillment within the required period of the orders of the VDV Military Council about the transfer of aircraft to other formations" removed from the held post, and is from June lowered in the service rank to Colonel.)
  - Colonel, since 1942 Major General Mikhail Denisenko (March – August 1942)
- 10th Airborne Corps:
  - Colonel, 1942 Major General Ivanov Nikolai Petrovich (November 1941 – August 1942)

== From Summer 1942 ==
In Summer 1942 the Stavka converted all ten airborne corps into guards rifle divisions to bolster Soviet forces in the south. Among them was the 6th Airborne Corps, which became the 40th Guards Rifle Division.

Yet:

'..[T]he Stavka still foresaw the necessity of conducting actual airborne operations later during the war. To have [such a force] the Stavka created eight new airborne corps (1st, 4th, 5th, 6th, 7th, 8th, 9th, and 10th) in the fall of 1942. Beginning in December 1942, these corps became ten guards airborne divisions (two formed from the 1st Airborne Corps and the three existing separate maneuver airborne brigades).'

The reformed 9th Airborne Corps was commanded by Colonel Mamontov Aleksey Georgievich (18 August – 29 October 1942) and Major General Travnikov Nikolai Grigorevich (29 October – December 1942). The reformed 10th Airborne Corps was commanded by Major General Alexander Kapitokhin (29 August – December 1942).

These divisions were numbered 1st, 2nd, 3rd, 4th, 5th, formed from 9th Airborne Corps (2nd formation), 6th, 7th, 8th, 9th, and 10th Guards Airborne Division.

'After the defeat of German forces at Kursk, the bulk of the airborne divisions joined in the pursuit of German forces to the Dnepr River. Even as ten guards airborne divisions fought at the front, new airborne brigades formed in the rear areas. In April and May 1943, twenty brigades formed and trained for future airborne operations. Most of these brigades had become six new guards airborne divisions (11th, 12th, 13th, 14th, 15th, 16th) by September 1943. The Stavka however, earmarked three of these airborne brigades use in an airborne operation to cross the Dnepr River.'

However, by January 1944, some of these formations (the 15th and 16th at least) were becoming Guards Rifle Divisions (the 15th became the 100th Guards in January 1944).

== Guards Airborne Corps from 1944 ==
David Glantz wrote in 1984:

In August [1944], the Stavka formed the 37th, 38th, and 39th Guards Airborne corps. By October, the newly formed corps had combined into a separate airborne army under Maj. Gen. I. I. Zatevakhin. However, because of the growing need for well-trained ground units, the new army did not endure long as an airborne unit. In December, separate airborne army the Stavka reorganized the separate airborne army into the 9th Guards Army of Col. Gen. V. V. Glagolev, and all divisions were renumbered as guards rifle divisions. As testimony to the elite nature of airborne-trained units, the Stavka held the 9th Guards Army out of defensive actions, using it only for exploitation during offensives.

From December 1944, the original VDV divisions were reconstituted as Guards Rifle formations.

- 37th Guards Svir Airborne Corps (19 January – 9 August 1944, and from 30 December 1944, 37th Guards Rifle Corps):
  - Lieutenant General Pavel Mironov (19 January 1944 – May 1946)
  - 98th Guards Svirsk Rifle Division
  - 99th Guards Rifle Division
  - 103rd Guards Rifle Division
- 38th Guards Airborne Corps:
  - Major General, from 5 November, Lieutenant General Alexander Kapitokhin (9 August 1944 year – 25 March 1945)
  - General Lieutenant Alexander Utvenko (26 March 1945 – July 1946)
  - 104th Guards Rifle Division
  - 105th Guards Rifle Division
  - 106th Guards Rifle Division
- 39th Guards Airborne Corps:
  - General Lieutenant Mikhail Tikhonov (August 1944 – June 1945).
  - 100th Guards Rifle Division
  - 107th Guards Rifle Division
  - 114th Guards Rifle Division (from 14th Guards Airborne Division (2nd formation))

There were significant reorganisations after the end of the war, and two new airborne corps (the 8th and 15th) were established. At the end of 1955 and the beginning of 1956 the 11th Guards Airborne Division, 21st Guards Airborne Division, 100th Guards Airborne Division and 114th Airborne Divisions were disbanded as well as all the airborne corps headquarters.
