= Ivan Shchukin (soldier) =

Soviet soldier

Ivan Fyodorovich Shchukin
- Иван Фёдорович Щукин
- Born: 27 December 1909; Bobrovka, Livensky Uyezd, Oryol Governorate, Russian Empire
- Died: 21 May 1985 (aged 75); Ramenskoye, Moscow Oblast, Russian SFSR, Soviet Union
- Military career
- Allegiance: Soviet Union
- Branch: Soviet Armed Forces
- Service years: 1931—1955
- Rank: Podpolkovnik
- Awards: Hero of the Soviet Union; Order of Lenin; Order of the Red Banner (twice); Order of the Patriotic War First Class; Order of the Red Star

Ivan Fyodorovich Shchukin (Russian: Иван Фёдорович Щукин; 27 December 1909 – 21 May 1985) was a Soviet soldier in the Second World War as a battalion commander in 301st Guards Rifle Regiment, 100th Guards Rifle Division, 9th Guards Army, 3rd Ukrainian Front. He was awarded the title of Hero of the Soviet Union for his wartime service.

== Biography ==
Shchukin was born into a farming family on 27 December [O.S. 14 December] 1909 in the village of Bobrovka, in what was then Livensky Uyezd, Oryol Governorate, in the Russian Empire. After graduating from a technical school he worked as a carpenter at the Kemerovo Coke and Chemical Plant. He joined the Red Army in 1931, and in 1939, graduated from the Omsk Military Infantry School, followed by the Vystrel course in 1940. He joined the Communist Party in 1942, and in February 1943 he was deployed to the front following the Axis invasion of the Soviet Union in 1941.

Shchukin was appointed a battalion commander in the 301st Guards Rifle Regiment, part of the 100th Guards Rifle Division, 9th Guards Army, of the 3rd Ukrainian Front. He took part in the advance of the Red Army during the later stages of the war, and by 1945 had the rank of Guards Major. Shchukin fought with his battalion in the Vienna offensive, storming a stronghold on the approaches to the city on 4 April 1945, and crossed the Vienna Shipping Canal on 12 April. For his actions, Shchukin was by decree of the Presidium of the Supreme Soviet on 28 April 1945, awarded the title of Hero of the Soviet Union, with the concurrent Order of Lenin and the gold star medal, No. 8934.

Shchukin continued to serve in the army after the war, the 100th Guards Rifle Division was formed as the 100th Guards Airborne Division in 1946, and Shchukin graduated from the Higher Officer Courses of the Soviet Airborne Forces in 1947, retiring in 1955 with the rank of lieutenant colonel (podpolkovnik). In retirement he settled in Ramenskoye, Moscow Oblast, working as a teacher in a secondary school, as an adjuster and foreman at the Tekhnopribor plant. Shchukin died on 21 May 1985, and was buried at the Old Cemetery in Ramenskoye.

== Honours and awards ==
Over his career Shchukin received, in addition to the title of Hero of the Soviet Union and the Order of Lenin, two Orders of the Red Banner, the Order of the Patriotic War First Class, the Order of the Red Star, and the Medal "For the Victory over Germany in the Great Patriotic War 1941–1945". A street in Ramenskoye is named after Shchukin, while another is named after the 100th Guards Airborne Division.
