= Soviet Airborne Forces =

Branch of the Soviet armed forces

- Vozdushno-desantnye voyska SSSR; Воздушно-десантные войска СССР
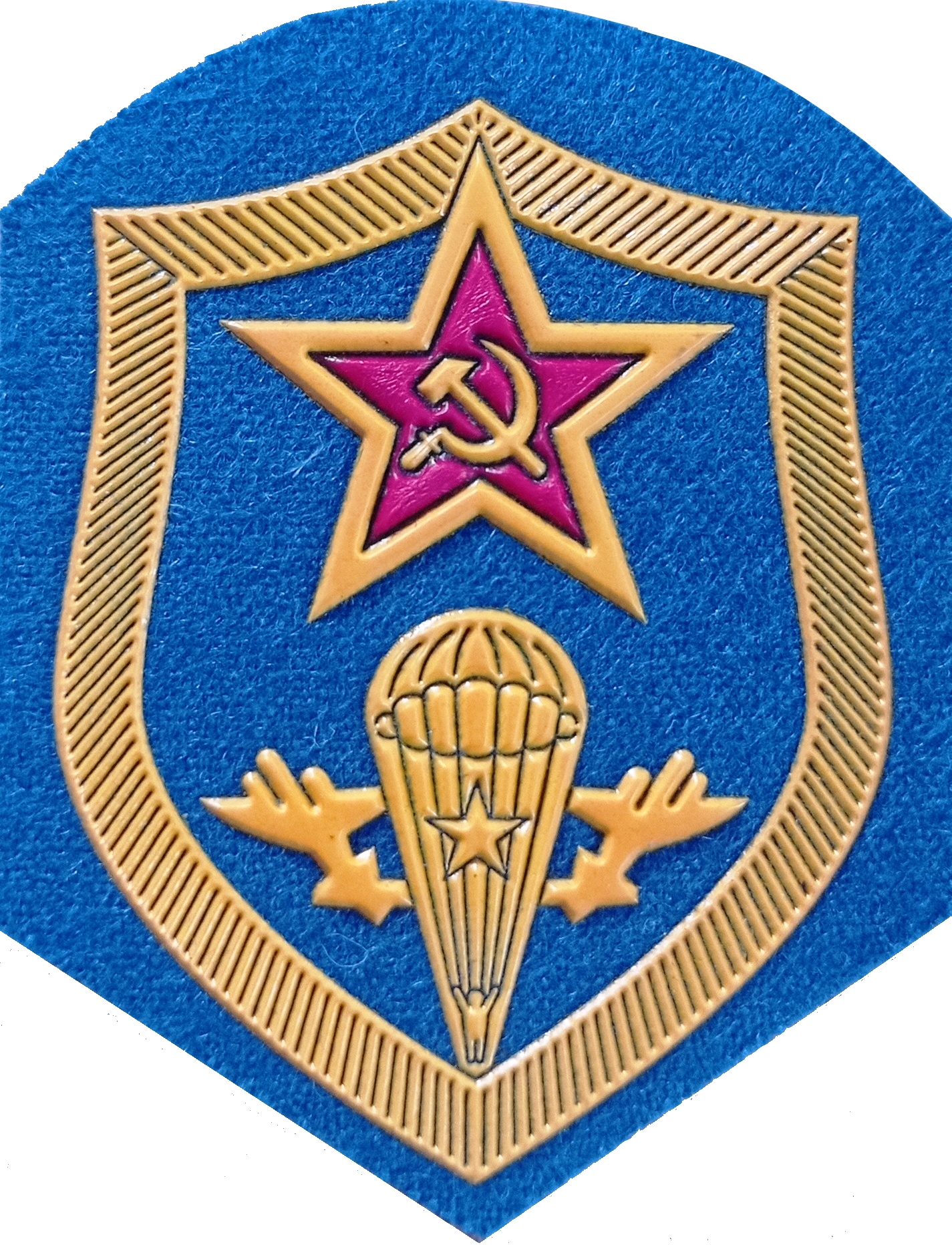
- Shoulder patch of the Soviet Airborne Forces, 1969–1991
- Active: 4 September 1941 – 14 February 1992
- Country: Soviet Union (1941–1991); Commonwealth of Independent States (1991–1992)
- Branch: Soviet Armed Forces
- Type: Airborne forces
- Role: Light infantry Airborne infantry Airmobile infantry Peacekeeping
- Size: January 1990 – 53,874; August 1991 – 77,036
- Nicknames: Войска дяди Васи (Uncle Vasya's Troops)
- Mottos: Никто, кроме нас! (Nobody, but us!)
- Engagements: Battle of Lake Khasan; Battles of Khalkhin Gol; World War II; First Nagorno-Karabakh War; Soviet–Afghan War

Commanders
- Notable commanders: Gen. Vasily Margelov

Insignia
- Flag of the Airborne Forces

The Soviet Airborne Forces, or VDV (from Vozdushno-desantnye voyska SSSR, Russian: Воздушно-десантные войска СССР, ВДВ; Air-landing Forces), was a separate troops branch of the Soviet Armed Forces. First formed before the Second World War, the VDV undertook two significant airborne operations and a number of smaller jumps during the war and for many years after 1945 was the largest airborne force in the world. The force was split after the dissolution of the Soviet Union, with the core becoming the Russian Airborne Forces, losing divisions to Belarus and Ukraine.

Troops of the Soviet Airborne Forces traditionally wore a sky blue beret and blue-striped telnyashka undershirts and they were named desant (Russian: Десант) from the French Descente. The Soviet Airborne Forces were noted for their relatively large number of vehicles, specifically designed for airborne transport. As such, they traditionally had a larger complement of heavy weaponry than most contemporary airborne forces.

== Interwar and World War II ==
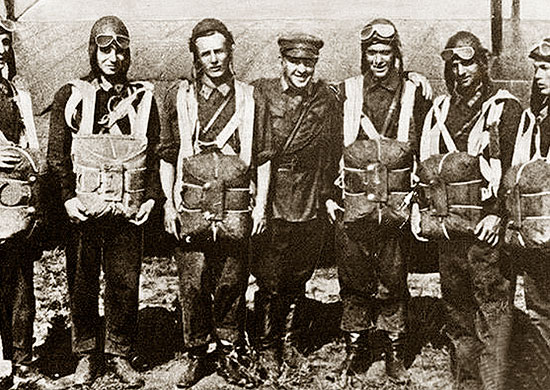
A group of parachutists Ya.D. Moshkovsky (far left) before the landing on August 2, 1930

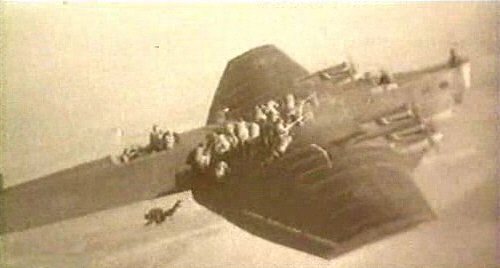
Soviet paratroopers deploy from a Tupolev TB-3 in 1930

The first airborne forces parachute jump is dated to 2 August 1930, taking place in the Moscow Military District. Airborne landing detachments were established after the initial 1930 experimental jump, but creation of larger units had to wait until 1932–33. On 11 December 1932, a Revolutionary Military Council order established an airborne brigade from the existing detachment in the Leningrad Military District. To implement the order, a directive of the Commissariat of Military and Naval Affairs transformed the Leningrad Military District's 3rd Motorised Airborne Landing Detachment into the 3rd Airborne Brigade (Special Purpose) commanded by M.V. Boytsov. In addition, the 13th and 47th Airborne Brigades plus three airborne regiments (the 1st, 2nd, and 5th, all in the Far East) were created in 1936. In March and April 1941, five Airborne Corps (divisions) were established on the basis of the existing 201st, 204th, 211th, 212th, and 214th Airborne Brigades. The number of Airborne Corps rose from five to ten in late 1941, but then all the airborne corps were converted into "Guards" Rifle Divisions in the northern hemisphere summer of 1942.

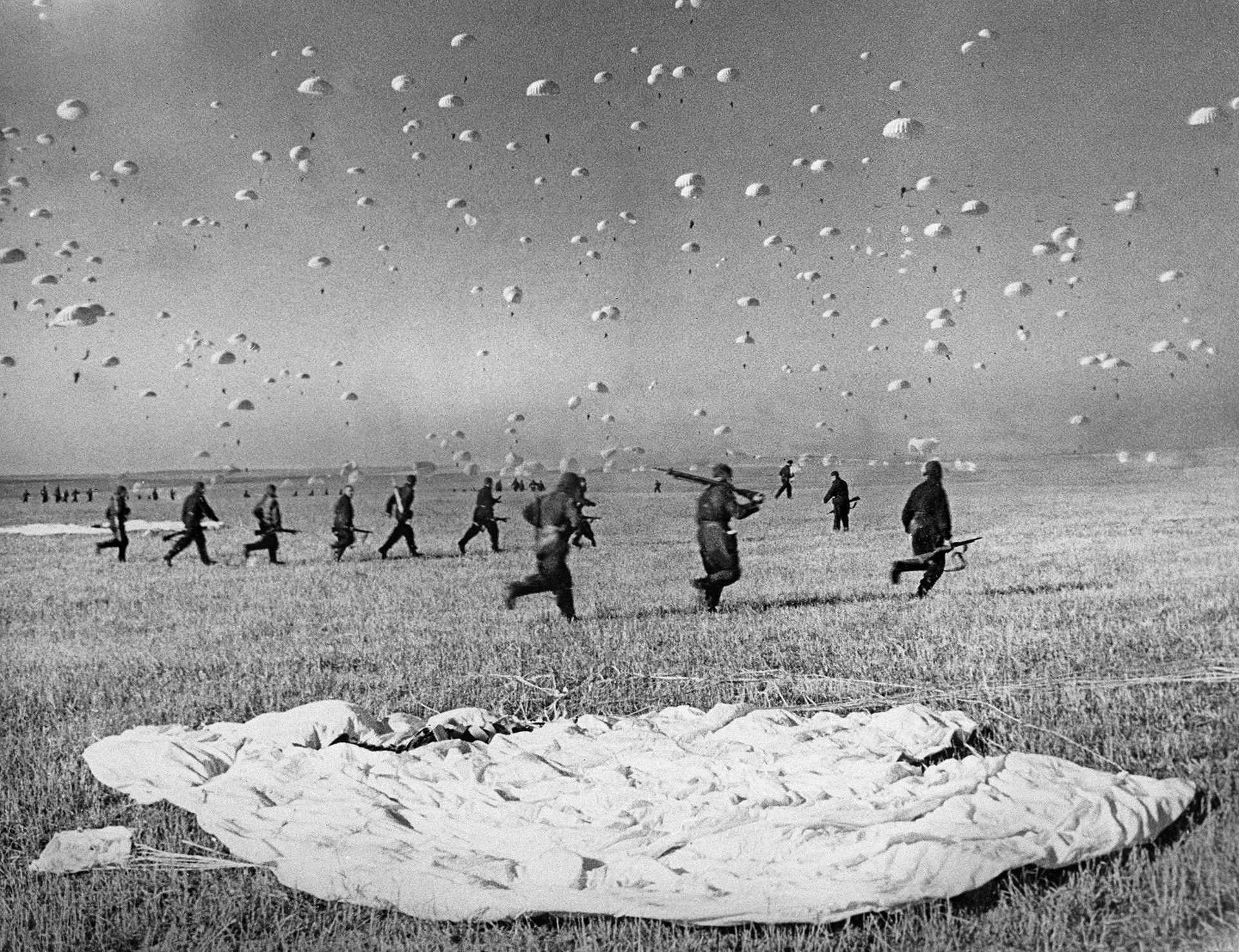
Kiev maneuvers in 1935. Collecting paratroopers after landing

The Soviet airborne forces were mostly used as 'foot' infantry during the war. Only a few small airborne drops were carried out in the first desperate days of Operation Barbarossa, in the vicinity of Kiev, Odessa, and the Kerch peninsula. The two significant airborne operations of the war were the Vyazma operation of February–March 1942, involving 4th Airborne Corps, and the Dnieper/Kiev operation of September 1943, involving a temporary corps formation consisting of 1st, 3rd, and 5th Airborne Brigades. Glantz wrote:

"After the extensive airborne activity during the winter campaign of 1941–42, [the] airborne forces underwent another major reorganization the following summer. Responding to events in southern Russia, where German troops had opened a major offensive that would culminate in the Stalingrad battles, the ten airborne corps, as part of the Stavka strategic reserves, deployed southward. Furthermore, the Stavka converted all ten airborne corps into guards rifle divisions to bolster Soviet forces in the south. Nine of these divisions participated in the battles around Stalingrad, and one took part in the defense of the northern Caucasus region."

The Stavka still foresaw the necessity of conducting actual airborne operations later during the war. To have such a force, the Stavka created eight new airborne corps (1st, 4th, 5th, 6th, 7th, 8th, 9th, and 10th) in the fall of 1942. Beginning in December 1942, these corps became ten guards airborne divisions (numbered 1st, 2nd, 3rd, 4th, 5th (formed from 9th Airborne Corps (2nd formation)), 6th, 7th, 8th, 9th, 10th, two formed from the 1st Airborne Corps and the three existing separate maneuver airborne brigades). The new guards airborne divisions trained in airborne techniques, and all personnel jumped three to ten times during training, though many were from jump towers.

After the defeat of German forces in the Battle of Kursk, the bulk of the airborne divisions joined in the pursuit of German forces to the Dnieper River which formed part of the German Panther–Wotan line which they defended. Even as ten guards airborne divisions fought at the front, new airborne brigades formed in the rear areas. In April and May 1943, twenty brigades formed and trained for future airborne operations. Most of these brigades had become six new guards airborne divisions (11th through 16th) by September 1943.

== Dnieper ==
The Stavka earmarked three airborne brigades for use in an airborne operation as part of the crossing of the Dnieper River.

The 1st, 3rd and 5th Guards Airborne Brigades were intended to secure the far side of the Dnieper between Kaniv and Rzhishchev. The drop was poorly executed and instead of the intended 10 by 14 km (6.2 by 8.7 mi) area, troops were dispersed over 30 by 90 km (19 by 56 mi) and unable to concentrate their forces. The majority were killed or captured; some survivors joined partisan groups.

David Glantz wrote in 1984:

In August [1944], the Stavka formed the 37th, 38th, and 39th Guards Airborne Corps. By October, the newly formed corps had combined into a separate airborne army under Maj. Gen. I. I. Zatevakhin. However, because of the growing need for well-trained ground units, the new army did not endure long as an airborne unit. In December, the Stavka reorganized the separate airborne army into the 9th Guards Army of Col. Gen. V. V. Glagolev, and all divisions were renumbered as guards rifle divisions. As testimony to the elite nature of airborne-trained units, the Stavka held the 9th Guards Army out of defensive actions, using it only for exploitation during offensives.

== Reconstitution ==
From 1944 the airborne divisions were reconstituted as Guards Rifle Divisions.

- 37th Guards Svirsk Airborne Corps (19 January – 9 August 1944, and from 30 December 1944, 37th Guards Rifle Corps):
  Lieutenant General Pavel Mironov (19 January 1944 – May 1946)
  - 98th Guards Svirsk Rifle Division
  - 99th Guards Rifle Division
  - 103rd Guards Rifle Division
- 38th Guards Airborne Corps:
  - Major General, from November 5, Lieutenant General Alexander Kapitokhin (August 9, 1944 – March 25, 1945)
  - Lieutenant General Alexander Utvenko (26 March 1945 – July 1946)
  - 104th Guards Rifle Division
  - 105th Guards Rifle Division
  - 106th Guards Rifle Division
- 39th Guards Airborne Corps:
  - Lieutenant General Mikhail Tikhonov (August 1944 – June 1945).
  - 100th Guards Rifle Division
  - 107th Guards Rifle Division
  - 114th Guards Rifle Division (from 14th Guards Airborne Division (2nd formation))

During the invasion of Manchuria and the South Sakhalin Operation, airborne units were used to seize airfields and city centers in advance of the land forces, and to ferry fuel to those units that had outrun their supply lines.

== Postwar ==
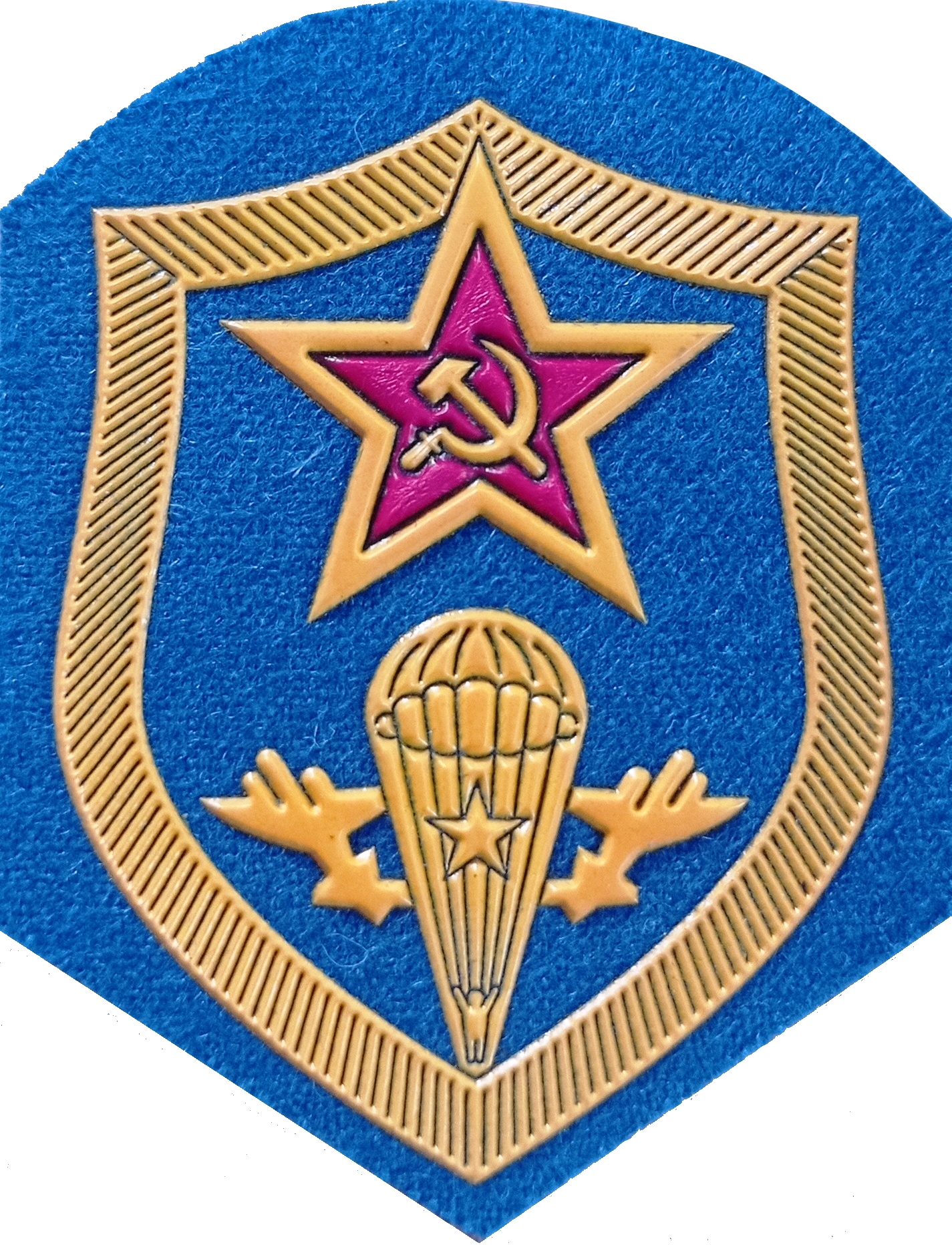
Shoulder sleeve insignia of the Soviet Airborne Forces

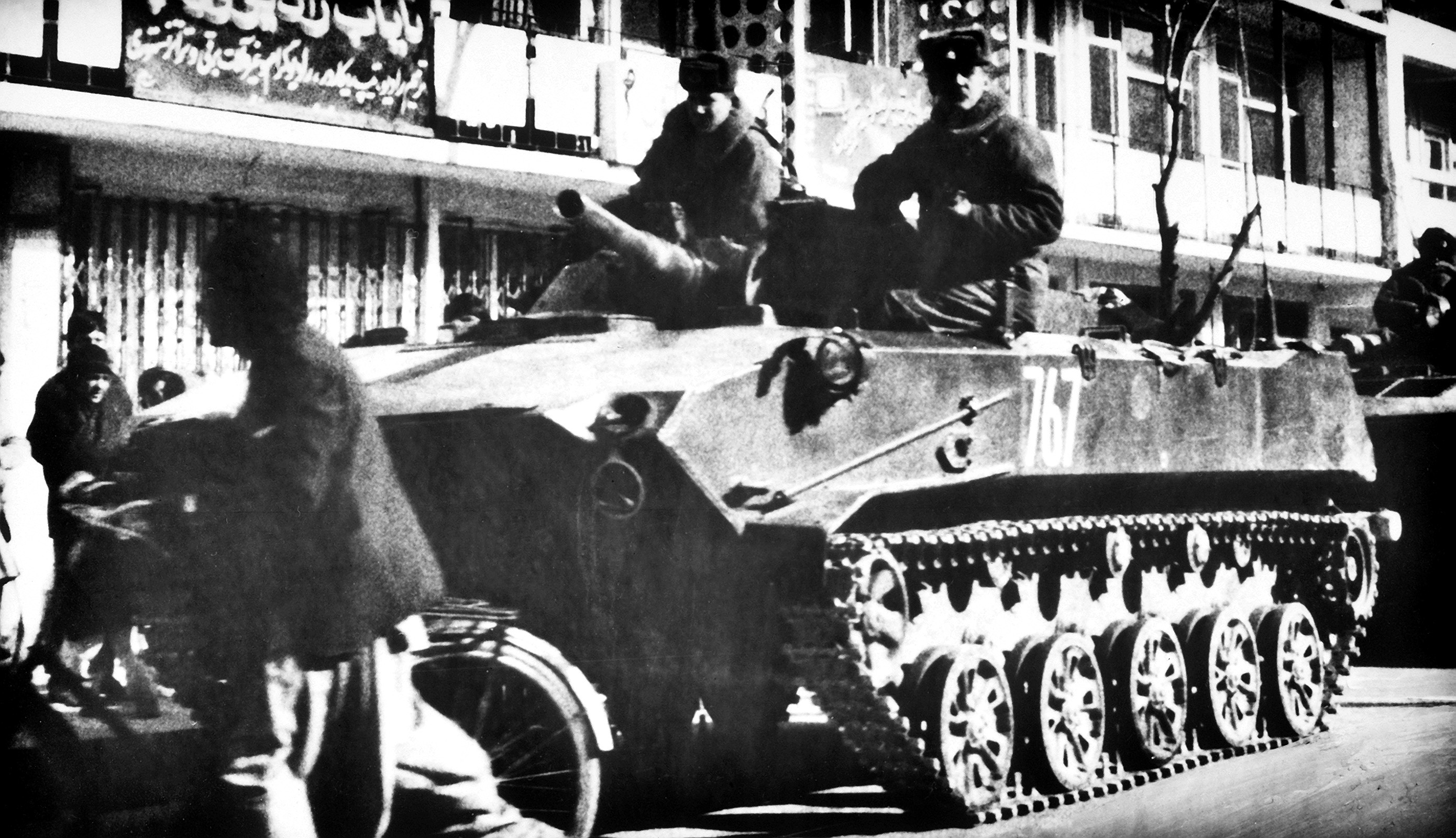
Soviet paratroopers on a BMD-1 vehicle in Afghanistan, March 25th, 1986

The HQ 9th Guards Army was redesignated Headquarters Airborne Forces in June 1946 after the war ended. The units of the army were transferred out of the Soviet Air Forces and assigned directly to the Ministry of the Armed Forces of the USSR.

In 1946 the force consisted of five corps (the 8th and 15th had been added) and ten divisions:

- 8th Guards Airborne Corps (103rd and 114th Divisions). The 114th Guards Airborne Division was established in 1946 on the basis of the similarly numbered Rifle Division in Borovukha (just east of Slutsk) in the Byelorussian SSR. The division was disbanded in 1956, with two of its regiments (the 350th and 357th) joining the 103rd Guards Airborne Division.
- 15th Guards Airborne Corps (the 76th and 104th Divisions at Pskov),
- 37th Guards Airborne Corps (the 98th and 99th in Primorsky Krai)
- 38th Guards Airborne Corps (105th and 106th at Tula),
- 39th Guards Airborne Corps at Belaya Tserkov in Ukraine (the 100th and 107th Guards Airborne Divisions (Chernigov, disbanded in 1959))

In the summer of 1948, five more Guards Airborne Divisions were created. The 7th (Lithuania, 8th Airborne Corps), the 11th (activated 1 October 1948 in Ryazan, Moscow Oblast, from the 347th Guards Air Landing Regiment, 38th Airborne Corps), the 13th Guards (at Galenki, Primorskiy Kray, with the 37th Airborne Corps), the 21st Guards (Estonia, Valga, with the 15th Airborne Corps), and the 31st Guards (Carpathians, 39th Airborne Corps). At the end of 1955 and the beginning of 1956 the 11th Guards, 21st, 100th and 114th Guards Airborne Divisions were disbanded as well as all the airborne corps headquarters. The number of divisions, thus, decreased to 11. In April 1955 the transport aircraft were separated from the VDV and the Air Force Military Transport Aviation was created. In 1959 the 31st and 107th Guards Airborne Divisions were disbanded, but in October 1960 the 44th Training Airborne Division was formed. In 1964 the Soviet Airborne Forces were directly subordinated to the Ministry of Defence.

The creation of the post-war Soviet Airborne Forces owe much to the efforts of one man, Army General Vasily Margelov, so much so that the abbreviation of VDV in the Airborne Forces is sometimes waggishly interpreted as Войска дяди Васи or "Uncle Vasya's Forces".

Airborne units of two divisions (7th and 31st Guards) were used during Soviet operations in Hungary during 1956, and the 7th Guards division was used again during the 1968 invasion of Czechoslovakia.

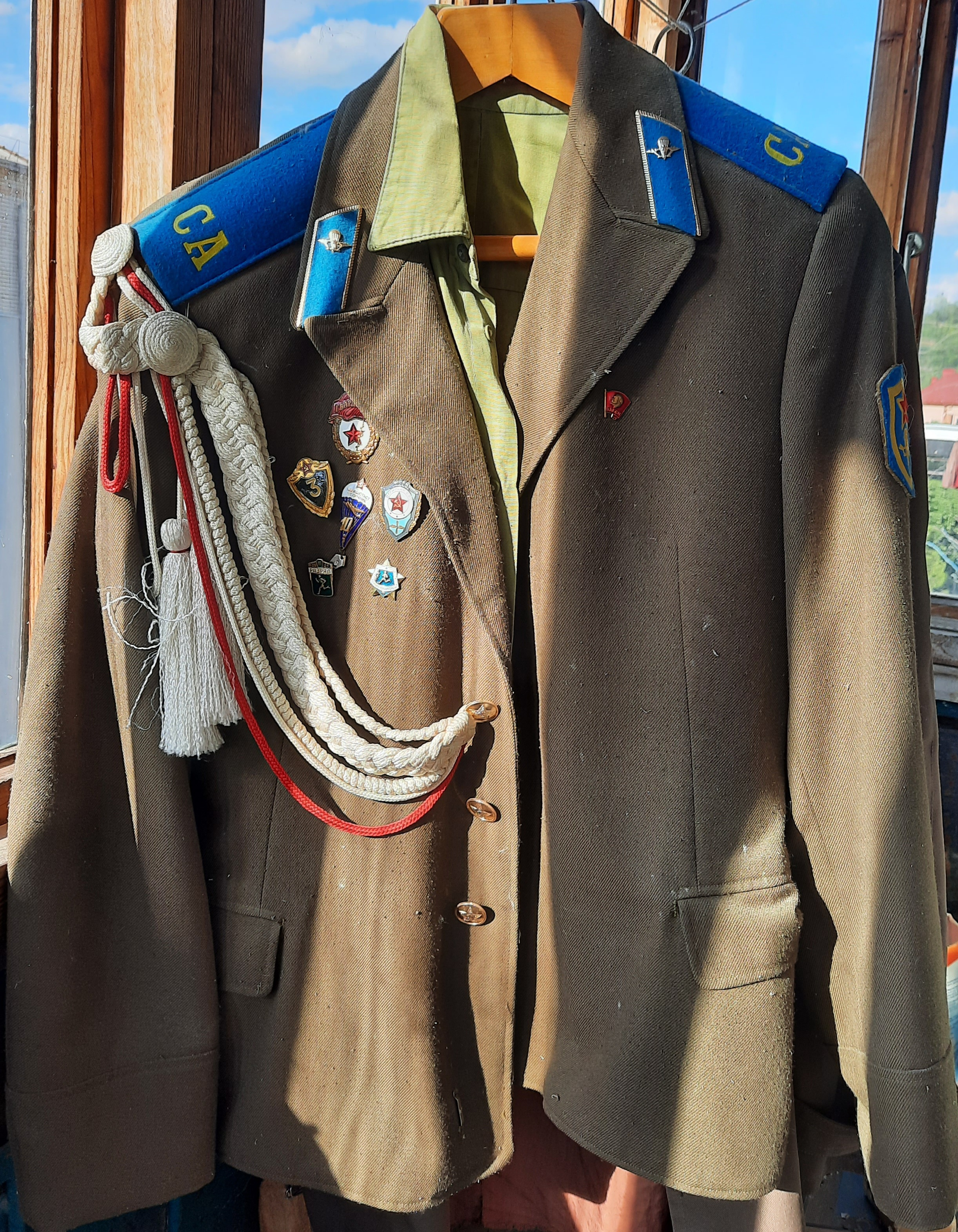
Parade tunic of a private of the Soviet Airborne Forces

The first experimental air assault brigade – the 1st Airborne Brigade – was apparently activated in 1967/1968 from parts of the 51st Guards Parachute Landing Regiment (PDP) (Tula), after the Soviets had been impressed by the American experiences in Vietnam War. In 1973 the 13th and 99th Airborne Divisions were reorganised as air assault brigades, and thus the number of divisions dropped to eight. There were also independent regiments and battalions. However, even by the 1980s only two divisions were capable of being deployed for combat operations in the first wave against NATO using Air Force Military Transport Aviation and Aeroflot aircraft.

Airborne Forces Commander-in-Chief Vasily Margelov had the idea to introduce the Telnyashka blue-and-white striped shirt as a sign of elite status of the airborne troops. In 1970, the telnyashka became an official part of the uniform.

In accordance with a directive of the General Staff, from August 3, 1979, to December 1, 1979, the 105th Guards Vienna Airborne Division was disbanded. From the division remained in the city of Fergana the 345th Independent Guards Airborne Regiment (much stronger than the usual regimental size) with the separate 115th military-transport aviation squadron. The rest of the personnel of the division were reassigned to fill out other incomplete airborne units and formations and to the newly formed air assault brigades. Based on the division's 351st Guards Parachute Regiment, the 56th Guards Separate Air Assault Brigade was formed in Azadbash, (Chirchiq district) Tashkent Oblast, Uzbek SSR. Meanwhile, the 111th Guards Parachute Regiment became the 35th Separate Guards Air Assault Brigade.

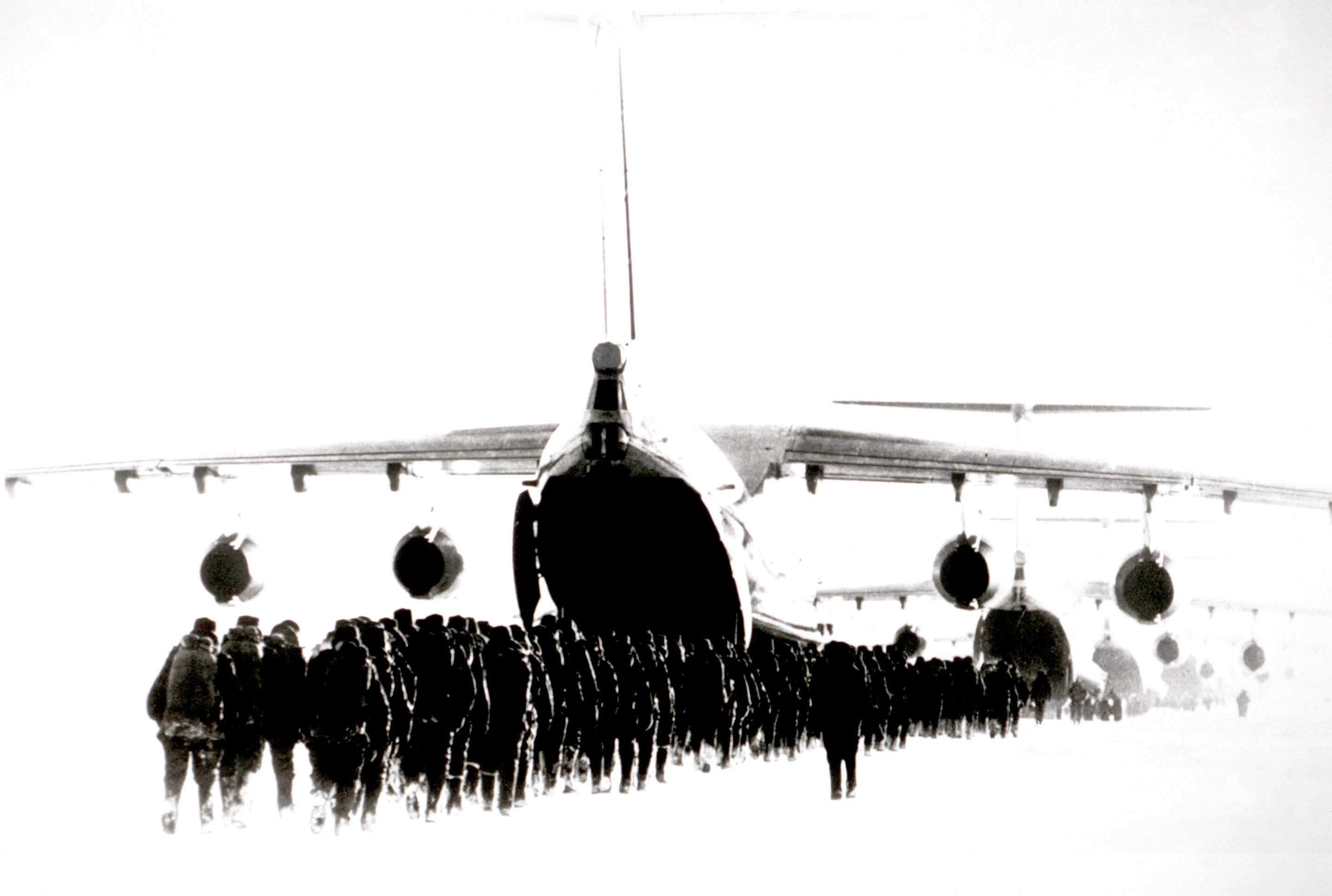
An Ilyushin Il-76 "Candid" loading VDV personnel in 1984

However, there was also a mistaken Western belief, either intentional Soviet deception or stemming from confusion in the West, that an Airborne Division, reported as the 6th, was being maintained at Belogorsk in the Far East in the 1980s. This maskirovka division was then 'disbanded' later in the 1980s, causing comment within Western professional journals that another division was likely to be reformed so that the Far East had an airborne presence. The division was not listed in V.I. Feskov et al.'s The Soviet Army during the period of the Cold War, (2004) and the division at Belogorsk, the 98th Guards Airborne Svirskaya Red Banner Order of Kutuzov Division moved to Bolgrad in Ukraine in late 1969.

The 103rd Guards Airborne Division, 345th Independent Guards Airborne Regiment and the 56th Air Assault Brigade fought in the Soviet–Afghan War.

== Units ==
The Airborne Forces (Воздушно-десантные войска (ВДВ), literal translation: Air-Landing Troops) of the Soviet Union and their present-day Russian Federation successor are a separate combat service directly subordinated to the General Staff. Their combat doctrine establishes their role as a highly mobile operational reserve of the armed forces, the last remaining Reserve of the Supreme High Command (Резерв главного командования (РГК)).

In 1989 a Soviet Air-Landing Division (Воздушно-десантная дивизия (вдд)) was organized into a division headquarters, three Parachute Landing Regiments (sing. Парашютно-десантный полк (пдп)) and various combat and service support units. V. I. Shaykin's historic study of the Airborne Forces lists the following force structure in 1989 (Military Detachment number (в/ч) given in brackets):

Directorate of the Commander of the Airborne Troops (Управление командующего ВДВ)(25953), Moscow, RSFSR

- units and establishments directly subordinated to the Directorate:
  - 879th Signals Nod
  - 196th Signals Regiment of the Airborne Troops (54164), Medvezhie Ozera, Moscow Oblast, RSFSR
  - 899th Spetsnaz Company (54766)
  - 387th Parachute Regiment (Fergana, Uzbek SSR);
  - 58th Military Transport Aviation Squadron (03417), Ryazan, Dyagilevo Airfield
  - 78th Military Transport Aviation Squadron, Klin Airfield
  - Ryazan Higher Air-Landing, twice awarded the Order of the Red Banner, named after the Lenin Comsomol Command School, Ryazan, RSFSR
  - 332nd NCO School of the Airborne Troops, Gaižiūnai, Lithuanian SSR
  - 2356th Central Automobile Storage of the Airborne Troops, Kubinka, Moscow Oblast, RSFSR
  - 3104th Central Base for Armament and Equipment Reserve of the Airborne Troops, Orekhovo-Zuyevo, Moscow Oblast, RSFSR
  - 5730th Central Base for Armored Vehicles of the Airborne Troops, Naro-Fominsk, Moscow Oblast, RSFSR
  - 3370th Central Storage for Air-Landing Equipment of the Airborne Troops, Kolomna, Moscow Oblast, RSFSR
  - 1029th Central Military Hospital of the Airborne Troops (52203), Tula, RSFSR
  - 984th Center for Sanitary-Epidemiological Oversight of the Airborne Troops (48837), Ivanovo, RSFSR
  - 176th Central Sanitary-Epidemiological Detachment
  - Military Sanatorium "Gudautskiy"
  - Military Sanatorium "Airborne Trooper"
  - 47th Singing and Dancing Ensemble of the Airborne Troops
  - 242nd Training Centre of the Airborne Troops, created from the 44th Training Airborne Division. However, the divisional banner was retained. The division was established in Ostrov in September 1960 as the 44th Training Airborne Division. In September 1961 it was transferred to the Lithuanian SSR.
    - Center HQ 20192), Gaižiūnai, Lithuanian SSR
    - 300th Training Signals Battalion (63295), Gaižiūnai, Lithuanian SSR
    - 226th Training Parachute Regiment (11929), Gaižiūnai, Lithuanian SSR
    - 285th Training Parachute Regiment (74995), Gaižiūnai, Lithuanian SSR
    - 301st Training Parachute Regiment (42227), Gaižiūnai, Lithuanian SSR
    - 743rd Training Parachute Battalion, Karmėlava, Lithuanian SSR
    - 1120th Training Self-Propelled Artillery Regiment (61222), Prienai, Lithuanian SSR
    - 367th Training Air Defence Missile and Artillery Battalion (33817), Gaižiūnai, Lithuanian SSR
    - 113th Training Combat Engineer Battalion (63291), Gaižiūnai, Lithuanian SSR
    - 340th Military Transport Aviation Squadron, Pociūnai Airfield (near Prienai), Lithuanian SSR
    - 148th Training Battalion for Heavy Air Landing Vehicles Familiarization (74163), Gaižiūnai, Lithuanian SSR
    - 45th Training Repair and Overhaul Battalion (59356), Gaižiūnai, Lithuanian SSR
    - 184th Training Medical Battalion (42235), Gaižiūnai, Lithuanian SSR
    - 373rd Training Automobile Battalion, Gaižiūnai, Lithuanian SSR
    - 214th Training Range
    - 2945th Unified Storage
    - 51518th Field Branch of Gosbank
- 7th Guards Cherkasskaya, awarded the Order of the Red Banner and the Order of Kutuzov Air Assault Division
  - Division Command and Staff, Kaunas, Lithuanian SSR
  - 743rd Signals Battalion (02050), Kaunas, Lithuanian SSR
  - 97th Guards Parachute Regiment (10999), Alytus, Lithuanian SSR
  - 108th Guards, Kuban Cossack, awarded the Order of the Red Star Parachute-Landing Regiment (02291), Kaunas, Lithuanian SSR
  - 119th Guards Parachute-Landing Regiment (10075), Marijampolė, Lithuanian SSR
  - 1141st Guards Artillery Regiment (02207), Kalvarija, Lithuanian SSR
  - 744th Air Defence Missile and Artillery Battalion (33817), Kaunas, Lithuanian SSR
  - 72nd Reconnaissance Company (86788), Kaunas, Lithuanian SSR
  - 143rd Combat Engineer Battalion Kazlų Rūda, Lithuanian SSR
  - 185th Military Transport Aviation Squadron, Kaunas, Lithuanian SSR
  - 1692nd Air-Landing Equipment Maintenance Battalion (96536), Kaunas, Lithuanian SSR
  - 1681st Supply Battalion, Kaunas, Lithuanian SSR
  - 6th Repair and Overhaul Battalion (58356), Kaunas, Lithuanian SSR
  - 313th Medical Battalion, Kaunas, Lithuanian SSR
  - 286th Station of the Field Courier Service
  - 215th Training Range (63319), Kazlų Rūda, Lithuanian SSR
  - 51502nd Field Branch of Gosbank
- 76th Guards Chernigovskaya, awarded the Order of the Red Banner Air Assault Division
  - Division Command and Staff, Pskov, RSFSR
  - 728th Separate Guards Signals Battalion (24538)
  - 104th Guards Parachute Regiment (32515), Cheryokha, suburb of Pskov, RSFSR
  - 234th Guards Parachute Regiment (74268), Pskov, RSFSR
  - 237th Guards Parachute Regiment (56264), Pskov, RSFSR
  - 1140th Guards, twice awarded the Order of the Red Banner Artillery Regiment
  - 165th Air Defence Missile and Artillery Battalion (81430)
  - 175th Guards Reconnaissance Company (64004)
  - 656th Combat Engineer Battalion (45293)
  - 242nd Military Transport Aviation Squadron (06776), Cheryokha, suburb of Pskov, RSFSR
  - 608th Airborne Equipment Maintenance Battalion (77011)
  - 1682nd Supply Battalion (42689)
  - 7th Repair and Overhaul Battalion
  - 586th Medical Battalion
- 98th Guards Svirskaya, awarded the Order of the Red Banner and the Order of Kutuzov Airborne Division
  - Division Command and Staff (штаб дивизии), Bolgrad, Odessa Oblast, Ukrainian SSR
  - 674th Separate Guards Signals Battalion (89592), Bolgrad
  - 217th Guards Parachute Regiment (42246), Bolgrad
  - 299th Guards Parachute Regiment (52432), Bolgrad
  - 300th Guards Parachute Regiment (40390), Kishinev, Moldovan SSR
  - 1065th Guards Artillery Regiment (31539), Vessyolliy Kut, Odessa Oblast, Ukrainian SSR
  - 100th Air Defence Missile and Artillery Battalion (73512), Bolgrad
  - 215th Guards Reconnaissance Company (03391)
  - 112th Combat Engineer Battalion
  - 243rd Military Transport Aviation Squadron(68226)
  - 613th Air-Landing Equipment Maintenance Battalion
  - 1683rd Supply Battalion
  - 15th Repair and Overhaul Battalion
  - 176th Medical Battalion
  - 728th Station of the Field Courier Service (36477)
  - ? Training Range, Tarutino, Odessa Oblast, Ukrainian SSR
- 103rd Guards, awarded the Order of Lenin, the Order of the Combat Red Banner, the Order of Kutuzov II class Airborne Division "60th Anniversary of the USSR"
  - Division Command and Staff (07197), Vitebsk, Byelorussian SSR
  - 742nd Signals Battalion
  - 317th Guards Parachute Regiment (52287, г. Витебск), Vitebsk, Byelorussian SSR
  - 350th Guards Parachute Regiment (64222, г. Полоцк), Polotsk, Vitebsk Oblast, Byelorussian SSR
  - 357th Guards Parachute Regiment (93684, г. Полоцк), Polotsk, Vitebsk Oblast, Byelorussian SSR
  - 62nd Tank Battalion
  - 1179th Artillery Regiment
  - 133rd Anti-Tank Artillery Battalion (133-й отдельный противотанковый артиллерийский дивизион)
  - 105th Air Defence Missile and Artillery Battalion (105-й отдельный зенитный ракетно-артиллерийский дивизион)
  - 80th Reconnaissance Company (80-я отдельная разведывательная рота)(86793)
  - 130th Combat Engineer Battalion (130-й отдельный инженерно-саперный батальон)
  - 210th Military Transport Aviation Squadron (210-я отдельная военно-транспортная авиационная эскадрилья)
  - 1388th Supply Battalion (1388-й отдельный батальон материального обеспечения)
  - 20th Repair and Overhaul Battalion (20-й отдельный ремонтно-восстановительный батальон)(59318)
  - 175th Medical Battalion (175-й отдельный медицинский батальон)
  - 274th Automobile Company (274-я отдельная автомобильная рота)
- 104th Guards, awarded the Order of the Combat Red Banner and the Order of Kutuzov II class Airborne Division
  - Division Command and Staff, Kirovabad, Azerbaijan SSR
  - 729th Signals Battalion (12192), Kirovabad, Azerbaijan SSR
  - 328th Guards Parachute Regiment (93626), Kirovabad, Azerbaijan SSR
  - 337th Guards Parachute Regiment, Kirovabad, Azerbaijan SSR
  - (345th Guards Airborne Regiment, Kirovabad, Azerbaijan SSR
  - 1080th Guards Artillery Regiment (73598), Şəmkir, Azerbaijan SSR
  - 103rd Air Defence Missile and Artillery Battalion
  - 110th Reconnaissance Company (64009), Kirovabad, Azerbaijan SSR
  - 132nd Combat Engineer Battalion (71296), Kirovabad, Azerbaijan SSR
  - 116th Military Transport Aviation Squadron
  - 611th Air-Landing Equipment Maintenance Battalion
  - 1684th Supply Battalion
  - 24th Repair and Overhaul Battalion
  - 180th Medical Battalion
  - 422nd Station of the Field Courier Service
- 106th Guards, awarded the Order of the Red Banner and the Order of Kutuzov Airborne Division
  - Division Command and Staff (55599), Tula, RSFSR
  - 731st Signals Battalion (93687)
  - 51st Guards Parachute Regiment (в/ч 33842), Tula, RSFSR
  - 137th Guards Parachute Regiment (в/ч 41450), Ryazan, RSFSR
  - 331st Guards Parachute Regiment, Kostroma, RSFSR
  - 1182nd Guards Artillery Regiment (93723), Efremov, Tula Oblast, RSFSR
  - 107th Air Defence Missile and Artillery Battalion (71298)
  - 181st Reconnaissance Company (86800)
  - 139th Combat Engineer Battalion (12159)
  - 110th Military Transport Aviation Squadron (25500)
  - 610th Airborne Equipment Maintenance Battalion (64024)
  - 1060th Supply Battalion (14403)
  - 43rd Repair and Overhaul Battalion (28393)
  - 234th Medical Battalion (52296)
  - 1883rd Station of the Field Courier Service (54235)

As a high readiness and long range main operational reserve of the General Staff the Airborne Troops could rely on the support of the whole Military Transport Aviation and Aeroflot aircraft mobilized for military service. The Airborne Troops also had their own organic aviation assets, but these had very limited airlift capabilities (Antonov An-2s and Mil Mi-8s) and were used for parachute training and liaison flights between the various units.

== Force Structure of the Soviet Airborne Forces in 1989 ==
V. I. Shaykin lists the following force structure of the Soviet airborne forces in 1989 in his study:

- General Staff of the Soviet Armed Forces
  - Soviet Airborne Troops High Command (Главное командование воздушно-десантных войск) - Moscow, RSFSR
    - 7th Guards Cherkasskaya, awarded the Order of the Red Banner and the Order of Kutuzov Air-Landing Division - Kaunas, Lithuanian SSR
    - 76th Guards Chernigovskaya, awarded the Order of the Red Banner Air-Landing Division - Pskov, RSFSR
    - 98th Guards Svirskaya, awarded the Order of the Red Banner and the Order of Kutuzov Air-Landing Division - Bolgrad, Ukrainian SSR (one parachute landing regiment in Kishinev, Moldavian SSR)
    - 103rd Guards, awarded the Order of Lenin, the Order of the Combat Red Banner, the Order of Kutuzov II degree Air-Landing Division "60th Anniversary of the USSR" - Vitebsk, Byelorussian SSR
    - 104th Guards, awarded the Order of the Combat Red Banner and the Order of Kutuzov II class Air-Landing Division - Kirovabad, Azerbaijan SSR
    - 106th Guards, awarded the Order of the Red Banner and the Order of Kutuzov Air-Landing Division - Tula, RSFSR
  - Ground Forces (Landing Assault Troops)
    - High Command of the Forces of the Western Strategic Direction (Главное командование войск Западного направления) - Legnica, Polish People's Republic
      - directly subordinated: 83rd Separate Landing Assault Brigade (83-я отдельная десантно-штурмовая бригада) - Białogard, Polish People's Republic
      - Western Group of Forces (Западная группа войск) - Wünsdorf, German Democratic Republic
        - directly subordinated: 35th Separate Landing Assault Brigade (35-я отдельная десантно-штурмовая бригада) - Cottbus, German Democratic Republic
        - 20th Guards Combined Arms Army (20-я гвардейская общевойсковая армия) - Magdeburg, German Democratic Republic
          - 899th Separate Landing Assault Battalion (899-й отдельный десантно-штурмовой батальон) - Burg bei Magdeburg, German Democratic Republic
        - 8th Guards Army (8-я гвардейская армия) - Nohra, GDR
          - 900th Separate Landing Assault Battalion (900-й отдельный десантно-штурмовой батальон) - Leipzig, German Democratic Republic
        - 1st Guards Tank Army (1-я гвардейская танковая армия) - Dresden, GDR
          - 1044th Separate Landing Assault Battalion (1044-й отдельный десантно-штурмовой батальон) - Königsbrück, German Democratic Republic
        - 2nd Guards Tank Army (2-я гвардейская танковая армия) - Fürstenberg/Havel, German Democratic Republic
          - 1185th Separate Landing Assault Battalion (1185-й отдельный десантно-штурмовой батальон) - Ravensbrück, German Democratic Republic
      - Central Group of Forces (Центральная группа войск) - Milovice, Czech SR, Czechoslovak Socialist Republic
        - 901st Separate Landing Assault Battalion (901-й отдельный десантно-штурмовый батальон) - Nové Zámky, Slovak SR, Czechoslovak Socialist Republic
      - Northern Group of Forces (Северная группа войск) - Legnica, Polish People's Republic
        - none (the 83rd Separate Landing Assault Brigade is located in the NGF area of responsibility)
      - Belorussian Military District (Белорусский военный округ) - Minsk, Byelorussian SSR
        - directly subordinated: 38th Separate Landing Assault Brigade (38-я отдельная десантно-штурмовая бригада) - Brest, Byelorussian SSR
        - 28th Combined Arms Army (28-й общевойсковая армия) - Grodno, Byelorussian SSR
          - 903rd Separate Landing Assault Battalion (903-й отдельный десантно-штурмовой батальон) - Grodno, Byelorussian SSR
        - 5th Guards Tank Army (5-я гвардейская танковая армия) - Bobruysk, Mogylev Oblast, Byelorussian SSR
          - 1011th Separate Landing Assault Battalion (1011-й отдельный десантно-штурмовой батальон) - Marjina Gorka, Minsk Oblast, Byelorussian SSR
        - 7th Red Banner Tank Army (7-я краснознамённая танковая армия) - Borisov, Minsk Oblast, Byelorussian SSR
          - 1151st Separate Landing Assault Battalion (1151-й отдельный десантно-штурмовой батальон) - Polotsk, Vitebsk Oblast, Byelorussian SSR
        - 5th Separate Guards Army Corps (5-й отдельный гвардейский армейский корпус) - Minsk, Byelorussian SSR
          - 1318th Separate Landing Assault Regiment (1318-й отдельный десантно-штурмовой полк) - Polotsk, Vitebsk Oblast, Byelorussian SSR
      - Carpathian Military District (Прикарпатский военный округ) -
        - directly subordinated: 39th Separate Landing Assault Brigade (39-я отдельная десантно-штурмовая бригада) - Khyrov, Ukrainian SSR
        - 13th Combined Arms Army (13-я общевойсковая армия) - Rovno, Ukrainian SSR
          - 904th Separate Landing Assault Battalion (904-й отдельный десантно-штурмовой батальон) - Volodymyr-Volynskyi, Volynskyi Oblast, Ukrainian SSR
        - 8th Tank Army (8-я танковая армия) - Zhytomyr, Ukrainian SSR
          - 1156th Separate Landing Assault Battalion (1156-й отдельный десантно-штурмовой батальон) - Novigrad-Volynskyi, Zhytomyr Oblast, Ukrainian SSR
        - 38th Combined Arms Army (38-й общевойсковая армия) - Ivano-Frankovsk, Ukrainian SSR
          - 1603rd Separate Landing Assault Battalion (1603-й отдельный десантно-штурмовой батальон) - Nadvornaya, Ivano-Frankovsk Oblast, Ukrainian SSR
    - High Command of the Forces of the South-Western Strategic Direction (Главное командование войск Юго-Западного направления) - Kishinev, Moldavian SSR
      - directly subordinated: 23rd Separate Landing Assault Brigade (23-я отдельная десантно-штурмовая бригада)(partially cadred, the HQ, one AAslt battalion, the artillery battalion and the support units active) - Kremenchug, Ukrainian SSR
      - Southern Group of Forces (Южная группа войск) - Budapest, Hungarian People's Republic
        - 902nd Separate Landing Assault Battalion (902-й отдельный десантно-штурмовой батальон) - Kecskemét, Hungarian People's Republic
      - Kiev Military District (Киевский военный округ) - Kiev, Ukrainian SSR
        - directly subordinated: 58th Separate Landing Assault Brigade (58-я отдельная десантно-штурмовая бригада)(cadred brigade, only brigade HQ of no more than 20 men active) - Kremenchug, Ukrainian SSR
        - 1st Guards Combined Arms Army (1-я гвардейская общевойсковая армия) - Chernigov, Ukrainian SSR
          - 908th Separate Landing Assault Battalion (908-й отдельный десантно-штурмовой батальон) - Goncharovskoye, Chernigov Oblast, Ukrainian SSR
      - Odessa Military District (Одесский военный округ) - Odessa, Ukrainian SSR
        - directly subordinated: 40th Separate Landing Assault Brigade (40-я отдельная десантно-штурмовая бригада) - Bol'shaya Korenikha, Nikolayev Oblast Ukrainian SSR
        - 14th Guards Combined Arms Army (14-я гвардейская общевойсковая армия) - Tiraspol, Moldavian SSR
          - 903rd Separate Landing Assault Battalion (903-й отдельный десантно-штурмовой батальон) - Bendery, Moldavian SSR
    - High Command of the Forces of the Southern Strategic Direction (Главное командование войск Южного направления) - Baku, Azerbaijan SSR
      - directly subordinated: 128th Separate Landing Assault Brigade (128-я отдельная десантно-штурмовая бригада)(cadred brigade, only brigade HQ of no more than 20 men active) - Stavropol, RSFSR
      - North Caucasus Military District (Северо-Кавказский военный округ) - Rostov-on-Don
        - none
      - Transcaucasian Military District (Закавказский военный округ) - Tbilisi, Georgian SSR
        - 21st Separate Landing Assault Brigade (21-я отдельная десантно-штурмовая бригада)HH - Kutaisi, Georgian SSR
      - Turkestan Military District (Туркестанский военный округ) - Tashkent, Turkestan SSR
        - 56th Separate Landing Assault Brigade (56-я отдельная гвардейская десантно-штурмовая бригада) - Chirchiq, Uzbek SSR
    - High Command of the Forces of the Far East (Главное командование войск Дальнего Востока) - Ulan-Ude, RSFSR
      - directly subordinated: 130th Separate Landing Assault Brigade (130-я отдельная десантно-штурмовая бригада)(cadred brigade, only brigade HQ of no more than 20 men active) - Abakan, Khakassian ASSR, RSFSR
      - Far Eastern Military District (Дальневосточный военный округ) - Khabarovsk, Khabarovsk Krai, RSFSR
        - directly subordinated: 13th Separate Landing Assault Brigade (13-я отдельная десантно-штурмовая бригада)HH - Magdagachi, Amur Oblast, RSFSR
        - 5th Combined Arms Army (5-я общевойсковая армия) - Ussuriysk, Primorskiy Krai, RSFSR
          - 1605th Separate Landing Assault Battalion (1605-й отдельный десантно-штурмовой батальон) - Spassk-Dalny, Primorskiy Krai, RSFSR
        - 15th Combined Arms Army (15-я общевойсковая армия) - ZATO Khabarovsk-41, Khabarovsk Krai, RSFSR
          - 1635th Separate Landing Assault Battalion (1635-й отдельный десантно-штурмовой батальон) - ZATO Khabarovsk-41, Khabarovsk Krai, RSFSR
        - 43rd Army Corps (43-й армейский корпус) - Birobidzhan, Jewish AO, RSFSR
          - 907th Separate Landing Assault Battalion (907-й отдельный десантно-штурмовой батальон) - Birobidzhan, Jewish AO, RSFSR
      - Transbaikal Military District (Забайкальский военный округ) - Chita Oblast, RSFSR
        - directly subordinated: 11th Separate Landing Assault Brigade (11-я отдельная десантно-штурмовая бригада)HH - Mogocha, Chita Oblast, RSFSR
        - 36th Combined Arms Army (36-я общевойсковая армия) - Borzya, Chita Oblast, RSFSR
          - 906th Separate Landing Assault Battalion (906-й отдельный десантно-штурмовой батальон) - Hada-Bulak, Chita Oblast, RSFSR
        - 29th Combined Arms Army (29-я общевойсковая армия) - Ulan-Ude, Buryat ASSR, RSFSR
          - 1154th Separate Landing Assault Battalion (1154-й отдельный десантно-штурмовой батальон) - Shelekhov, Irkutsk Oblast, RSFSR
        - 39th Combined Arms Army (39-я общевойсковая армия) - Ulaanbaatar, Mongolian People's Republic
          - 1609th Separate Landing Assault Battalion (1609-й отдельный десантно-штурмовой батальон) - Mandalgovi, Mongolian People's Republic
        - 48th Separate Guards Army Corps (48-й отдельный гвардейский армейский корпус) - Kyakhta, Buryat ASSR, RSFSR
          - 1319th Separate Landing Assault Regiment (1319-й отдельный десантно-штурмовой полк) - Sudzha (21 km away from Kyakhta), Buryat ASSR, RSFSR
    - Internal Military Districts directly subordinated to the General Staff
      - Moscow Military District (Московский военный округ) - Moscow, RSFSR
        - none (106th Air Landing Division of the VDV based in Tula in the District's AOR)
      - Leningrad Military District (Ленинградский военный округ) - Leningrad, RSFSR
        - 36th Separate Landing Assault Brigade (36-я отдельная десантно-штурмовая бригада) - Garbolovo, Leningrad Oblast, RSFSR
        - 6th Combined Arms Army (6-я общевойсковая армия) - Petrozavodsk, Karelian ASSR, RSFSR
          - 1179th Separate Landing Assault Battalion (1179-й отдельный десантно-штурмовой батальон) - Petrozavodsk, Karelian ASSR, RSFSR
      - Baltic Military District (Прибалтийский военный округ) - Riga, Latvian SSR
        - 37th Separate Landing Assault Brigade (37-я отдельная десантно-штурмовая бригада) - Chernyakhovsk, Kaliningrad Oblast, RSFSR
        - 11th Guards Combined Arms Army (11-я гвардейская общевойсковая армия) - Kaliningrad, Kaliningrad Oblast, RSFSR
          - 1039th Separate Landing Assault Battalion (1039-й отдельный десантно-штурмовой батальон) - Chernyakhovsk, Kaliningrad Oblast, RSFSR
      - Volga Military District (Приволжский военный округ) - Kuybyshev
        - none
      - Central Asian Military District (Среднеазиатский военный округ) - Alma-Ata, Kazakh SSR
        - 57th Separate Landing Assault Brigade (57-я отдельная десантно-штурмовая бригада)(partially cadred, the HQ, one AAslt battalion, the artillery battalion and the support units active) - Aktogay, Semipalatinsk Oblast, Kazakh SSR
      - Ural Military District (Уральский военный округ) - Sverdlovsk, RSFSR
        - none
      - Siberian Military District (Сибирский военный округ) - Novosibirsk, RSFSR
        - none

note: HH is not an official designation, but denotes Helicopter-Heavy - The original three Air Assault Brigades - the 11th, 13th and 21st had their organic helicopter regiments and they have retained them until 1988~89. The brigades, which were formed later lacked own helicopter assets and relied on the helicopter regiments of their higher echelon commands.

note: The 36th Army with its 906th Separate Assault Landing Battalion and the 86th Army Corps with its 1154th Separate Assault Landing Battalion need further investigation, as the 86th Army Corps was expanded into the 36th Combined Arms Army on June 1, 1976, and could not exist simultaneously around 1989, as the Army was itself reduced into the 55th Army Corps on June 1, 1989.

=== Training establishments ===
- Mikhailovskaya Artillery Military Academy
- Ryazan Guards Higher Airborne Command School
- 44th Airborne Division, later 242nd Training Centre

== Commanders of the Soviet Airborne Forces ==
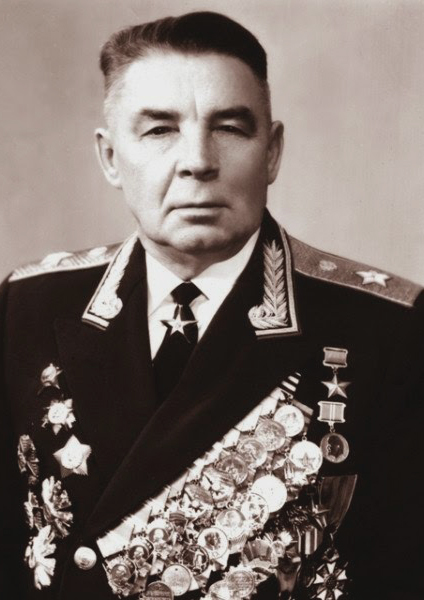
Army general Vasily Margelov, the longest-serving Commander of the Soviet Airborne Forces

Name	Rank	Period of command
Vasily Glazunov	Major general	September 1941 – June 1943
Alexander Kapitokhin	Lieutenant general	June 1943 – August 1944
Ivan Zatevakhin	Lieutenant general	August 1944 – January 1946
Vasily Glagolev	Colonel general	January 1946 – October 1947
Alexander Kazankin	Lieutenant general	October 1947 – December 1948
Sergei Rudenko	Colonel general of the Air Force	December 1948 – January 1950
Alexander Kazankin	Lieutenant general	January – March 1950
Alexander Gorbatov	Colonel general	March 1950 – May 1954
Vasily Margelov	Lieutenant general	May 1954 – March 1959
Ivan Tutarinov	Colonel general	March 1959 – July 1961
Vasily Margelov	Army general	July 1961 – January 1979
Dmitri Sukhorukov	Army general	January 1979 – July 1987
Nikolai Kalinin	Colonel general	August 1987 – January 1989
Vladislav Achalov	Colonel general	January 1989 – December 1990
Pavel Grachev	Major general (Note: Lieutenant general until 6 January 1991.)	December 1990 – August 1991
Yevgeny Podkolzin	Colonel general	August 1991 – February 1992

== Traditions ==
The service march of the airborne forces is We Need One Victory, also known as Our 10th Parachute Battalion. It was made by poet Bulat Okudzhava, written for the feature film Belorussian Station by Andrei Smirnov (1970). It was later adapted by Alfred Schnittke to be performed as a march to be played at the Moscow Victory Day Parade on Victory Day (9 May).

=== Paratroopers' Day celebrations ===
On Airborne Forces Day in many Russian cities, it is customary to turn off the fountains and hold veteran reunions near those fountains.

=== Bands ===
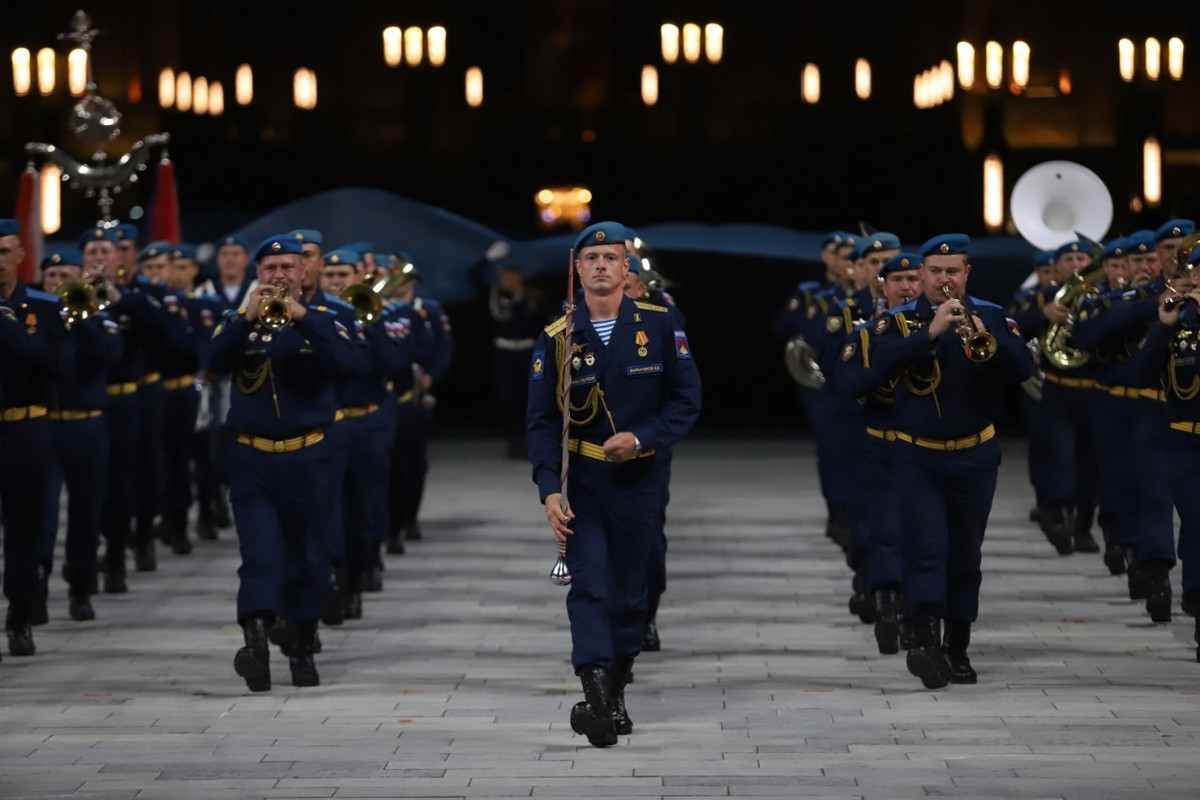
The combined band

The Combined Military Band of the Airborne Forces is an integral part of all the solemn events of the Airborne Forces. Every year, the band's personnel take part in the Victory Parade on Red Square, as well as the opening ceremony of the International Army Games. In the ranks of the combined band are musicians of the military bands of the airborne and assault formations of the Airborne Forces. There are six other military bands in the airborne forces. The Song and Dance Ensemble of the Airborne Forces is the theatrical troupe of the VDV. It began its creative activity in 1937, as the Red Army Song and Dance Ensemble of the Kyiv Military District, numbering only 18 people. On 3 May 1945, three days after the signing of the German armistice, the ensemble gave a concert on the steps of the destroyed Reichstag. During the Cold War, the unit was known as the Song and Dance Ensemble of the Group of Soviet Forces in Germany. During this time, it had participated in concerts in the cities of East Germany, Czechoslovakia, and Poland. It gained its current status in 1994. The Song and Dance Ensemble also contains the Blue Berets musical group.

== See also ==
- Awards and emblems of the Ministry of Defence of the Russian Federation

== Bibliography ==
- Bonn, Keith E.(ed.), Slaughterhouse: The handbook of the Eastern Front, Aberjona Press, Bedford, PA, 2005
- Brinkster.com VDV at Brinskster.com
- Feskov, V.I.; K.A. Kalashnikov; V.I. Golikov (2004). The Soviet Army in the Years of the 'Cold War' (1945–1991). Tomsk: Tomsk University Press. ISBN 5-7511-1819-7.
- Feskov, V.I.; Golikov, V.I.; Kalashnikov, K.A.; Slugin, S.A. (2013). Вооруженные силы СССР после Второй Мировой войны: от Красной Армии к Советской [The Armed Forces of the USSR after World War II: From the Red Army to the Soviet: Part 1 Land Forces] (in Russian). Tomsk: Scientific and Technical Literature Publishing. ISBN 9785895035306.
- Glantz, David (November 1984). The Soviet Airborne Experience. Research Survey No. 4. Combat Studies Institute.
- Isby, David C., Weapons and tactics of the Soviet Army, Jane's Publishing Company, London 1988
- Schofield, Carey, The Russian Elite: Inside Spetsnaz and the Airborne Forces, Stackpole/Greenhill, 1993
- Simpkin, Richard, Red Armour: An examination of the Soviet Mobile Force Concept, Brassey's Defence Publishers, London, 1984
- Staskov, Lt. Gen. N.V., 1943 Dnepr Airborne Operation: Lessons and Conclusions, Military Thought, Vol. 12, No.4, 2003 (in Russian)
- Besedovskyy V., Uniforms and history of the Soviet Airborne - the 345th Regiment in Afghanistan, 2021, ISBN 978-617-8064-11-2
