= Mikhail Tikhonov =

Soviet military commander

Mikhail Fyodorovich Tikhonov
- Tikhonov in 1959
- Native name: Михаил Фёдорович Тихонов
- Born: 11 November 1900; Odessa, Odessa Governorate, Russian Empire
- Died: 11 February 1971 (aged 70) Moscow, Soviet Union
- Buried: Novodevichy Cemetery
- Allegiance: Soviet Union
- Branch: Red Army (Soviet Army from 1946)
- Service years: 1918–1962
- Rank: Lieutenant general
- Commands: 7th Airborne Brigade; 2nd Airborne Corps; 32nd Guards Rifle Division; 11th Guards Rifle Corps; 108th Rifle Corps; 39th Guards Airborne Corps
- Conflicts: Russian Civil War; World War II; Winter War; Eastern Front
- Awards: Hero of the Soviet Union; Order of Lenin (3); Order of the Red Banner (4); Order of Kutuzov, 1st class; Order of Suvorov, 2nd class; Order of the Patriotic War, 1st class; Order of the Red Star (2); Legion of Merit

Mikhail Fyodorovich Tikhonov (Russian: Михаил Фёдорович Тихонов; 11 November 1900 – 11 February 1971) was a Soviet Army lieutenant general and Hero of the Soviet Union. Tikhonov fought in the Russian Civil War and the Winter War. He commanded the 39th Guards Rifle Corps during the Vienna Offensive. After the end of World War II, Tikhonov continued his career in the Soviet Armed Forces and was the chief Soviet advisor to the Hungarian People's Army during the Hungarian Revolution of 1956.

== Early life ==
Mikhail Tikhonov was born on 11 November 1900 in Odessa to a family of workers. In 1912, he graduated from the 4th class in the Vladivostok City College. He graduated from the vocational school in Kimry in 1914. Tikhonov worked as a messenger for a Moscow bookstore and at a Moscow slaughterhouse. From 1916, he was a mechanic at the railroad depot at Petrograd's Finland Station. He became a plumber in the Moscow City food department in June 1918. In October, he was in the Red Army.

Tikhonov first participated in the suppression of anti-Soviet forces in the Kirsanovsky Uyezd of Tambov Governorate and then fought on the Southern Front and on the Southeastern Front. He originally was an officer in the 3rd Reserve Cavalry Regiment. On 29 October 1918, he was wounded. Tikhonov joined the Communist Party of the Soviet Union in 1919. In October 1919, he graduated from the Moscow Cavalry Courses. Tikhonov became the commander of a cavalry squadron training courses for the 8th Army in October 1919. In April 1920, he became a platoon commander and head of intelligence for the 1st Cavalry Regiment of the 22nd Rifle Division. He was again wounded on 1 November. In December, Tikhonov was the adjutant in a unit of the 9th Kuban Army. In the same year, Tikhonov was awarded a Central Executive Committee of the RSFSR-inscribed gold watch for reported personal bravery.

== Interwar ==
In June 1921, Tikhonov graduated from the repeated courses of cavalry higher command in Kharkiv. He became a squadron commander of the 44th Cavalry Regiment, part of the 3rd Separate Cavalry Brigade and the 57th Rifle Division in August 1921. During that year and 1922, he participated in operations against anti-Soviet groups in Troitsky Uyezd, Chelyabinsk Province. Between April and August 1923, Tikhonov studied at the Volga Military District cavalry commanders courses. After their end, he returned to the 44th Cavalry Regiment, fighting to suppress an uprising in Chechnya and was wounded on 21 February 1925. From April, he was assistant to the commander of the 68th Cavalry Regiment of the North Caucasus Military District. For these actions, he was awarded honorary weapons in 1928.

Tikhonov graduated from the Frunze Military Academy in 1930. In May he became the 33rd Cavalry Regiment's chief of staff. He became chief of staff for the 6th Cavalry Division in April 1931. From November, he was in the Red Army first management staff. Tikhonov later became assistant chief and chief of the sector and then the assistant chief and chief of the operational department. In June 1935 Tikhonov went to Mongolia as an advisor to the Mongolian People's Army cavalry. Between December 1935 and April 1936 he participated in the border conflicts with Japan in the Tamsak-Bulak area. For his actions during the border conflicts, Tikhonov was awarded the Mongolian Order of the Red Banner and the Order of the North Star.

After returning to the Soviet Union, Tikhonov became the commander of the 71st Reserve Cavalry Regiment in March 1939. In December 1939 he became the commander of the 1st Cavalry Regiment of the 1st Separate Cavalry Brigade based in the Moscow Military District. During January and March 1940, Tikhonov fought in the Winter War commanding the 28th Cavalry Regiment in the same brigade as part of the 13th Army. He was sent to study at the Military Academy of Command and Officers of the Red Army Air Force in October. After graduating in May 1941, he was appointed commander of the 7th Airborne Brigade, part of the 4th Airborne Corps in the Western Special Military District.

== World War II ==
After Operation Barbarossa, the 7th Airborne Brigade took part in the defense of the line on the Berezina River. Tikhonov was seriously wounded on 4 July and commanded the reformed 2nd Airborne Corps after leaving the hospital. The corps became the 32nd Guards Rifle Division in May 1942, part of the 47th Army deployed in defence of the Black Sea coast. After the German breakthrough in Case Blue during the summer, the division was transferred to Tuapse, where it reportedly disrupted German attacks on the city. Tikhonov was awarded the Order of the Red Banner for his actions defending Tuapse. On 17 November, he was promoted to major general. From January 1943, the division fought in the Battle of the Caucasus and the Krasnodar Offensive. On 30 January, he was awarded the Order of the Red Banner for his leadership of the 7th Airborne Brigade in 1941. From 9 March to 2 April, Tikhonov commanded the 11th Guards Rifle Corps, part of the 9th Army during the advance on the Taman Peninsula. In July he became the deputy commander of the 58th Army, where he was wounded and in August the deputy commander of the 56th Army. Tikhonov fought in the Novorossiysk-Taman Operation and was wounded again in October. Tikhonov was awarded the Order of the Patriotic War, 1st class on 25 October.

In January 1944, Tikhonov was appointed commander of the 108th Rifle Corps of the Leningrad Front's 42nd Army. During the Leningrad–Novgorod Offensive, the army captured Ropsha, Krasnogvardeysk, Gdov and Koivisto, as well as helping break the Siege of Leningrad. He was promoted to lieutenant general on 22 February. In the spring, the corps transferred to the line of Vyborg and fought in the Vyborg–Petrozavodsk Offensive, capturing Uuras. On 9 August 1944, he became the commander of the 39th Guards Airborne Corps in Kalinin. In January 1945, the corps converted to infantry as part of the 9th Guards Army. The corps was sent to the front on 21 March and fought in the Vienna Offensive, in which it participated in the capture of Vienna. On 28 April, Tikhonov was awarded the Order of Kutuzov 1st class. After the capture of Vienna it advanced in the Prague Offensive. For his actions during the Vienna offensive, Tikhonov was awarded the title Hero of the Soviet Union and the Order of Lenin on 29 June.

== Postwar ==
In October 1945, Tikhonov became the assistant chief of drill at the Frunze Military Academy. In 1949 he became its first deputy chief and in 1950 the deputy head of the Academy of scientific and educational work. In September 1952, he left the Academy of Scientific and educational work and entered the higher academic courses at the Military Academy of the General Staff, from which he graduated in 1953. In September he became the chief military advisor to the Hungarian People's Army and also the military attache at the Soviet embassy in Budapest. In March 1957 he became the head of the department of general tactics and operational training at the Military-Engineering Red Banner Academy named for V.V. Kuybyshev. In October 1962, he retired and died on 11 February 1971. Tikhonov was buried in Novodevichy Cemetery.

== Awards and decorations ==
Soviet Union

Hero of the Soviet Union (29 June 1945)
Order of Lenin, thrice (29 June 1944, 21 February 1945, 29 June 1945)
Order of the Red Banner, four times (13 December 1942, 30 January 1943, 3 November 1944, 20 June 1949)
Order of Suvorov, 2nd class (21 February 1944)
Order of Kutuzov, 1st class (28 April 1945)
Order of the Patriotic War, 1st class (25 October 1943)
Order of the Red Star, thrice (22 February 1941, 28 October 1967)
Medal "For the Defence of the Caucasus" (1944)
Medal "For the Capture of Vienna" (1945)
Medal "For the Defence of Leningrad" (1942)
Jubilee Medal "Twenty Years of Victory in the Great Patriotic War 1941-1945" (1965)
Jubilee Medal "In Commemoration of the 100th Anniversary of the Birth of Vladimir Ilyich Lenin" (1969)
Jubilee Medal "XX Years of the Workers' and Peasants' Red Army" (1938)
Jubilee Medal "30 Years of the Soviet Army and Navy" (1948)
Jubilee Medal "40 Years of the Armed Forces of the USSR" (1958)
Jubilee Medal "50 Years of the Armed Forces of the USSR" (1968)
Medal "In Commemoration of the 800th Anniversary of Moscow" (1947)
Medal "In Commemoration of the 250th Anniversary of Leningrad" (1957)

Foreign

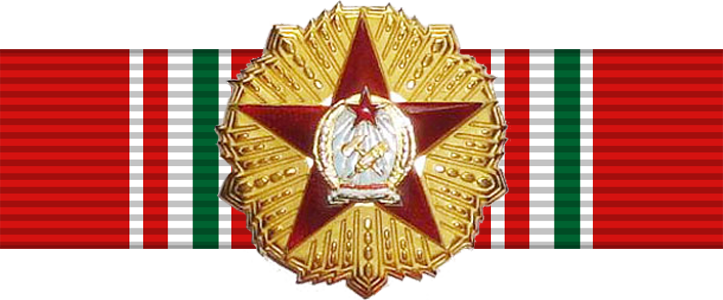
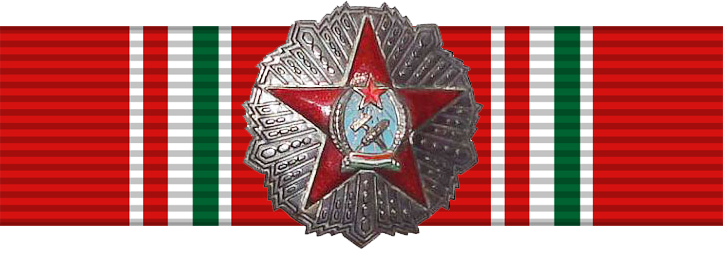
Order of the Red Star (Czechoslovakia)
Order of Merit of the Hungarian People's Republic, 1st class (Hungary)
Order of Merit of the Hungarian People's Republic, 3rd class (Hungary)
Order of the Red Banner (Mongolia)
Order of Military Merit (Mongolia)
Silver Cross of the Virtuti Militari (Poland)
Officer of the Legion of Merit (United States)
