= 31st Guards Airborne Division =

- Active: 1948–1959
- Country: Soviet Union
- Branch: Soviet airborne
- Type: Airborne
- Size: Division
- Garrison/HQ: Novohrad-Volynskyi
- Engagements: Hungarian Revolution of 1956
- Decorations: Order of Kutuzov

The 31st Guards Airborne Division was an airborne division of the Soviet airborne from 1948 to 1959. Originally part of the 39th Guards Airborne Corps, it was directly subordinated to Soviet airborne headquarters after the corps was disbanded in 1955. The division's only combat occurred in Operation Whirlwind, the suppression of the Hungarian Revolution of 1956.

== History ==
The 31st Guards Airborne Division was formed on 15 October 1948 from the 298th Guards Airborne Regiment of the 100th Guards Airborne Division in Novohrad-Volynskyi, part of the 39th Guards Airborne Corps. The division inherited the Order of Kutuzov from the regiment. Its 381st Guards Air Landing Regiment was converted to an airborne regiment at some point. The division's Separate Air Landing Security Company was disbanded in 1949. On 15 November 1953, its 716th Separate Guards Communications Company became a battalion, along with the Separate Medical & Sanitary Company. The Separate Guards Antitank Battalion and Separate Guards Reconnaissance Company were disbanded on the same date. On 30 April 1955, the 109th Guards Airborne Regiment became part of the division after its original parent unit, the 100th Guards Airborne Division was disbanded. The 152nd Separate Tank Destroyer Battalion was activated on the same day.

Due to the Hungarian Revolution of 1956, two regiments of the division were placed on alert. On 1 November, the 114th and 381st Guards Airborne Regiments of the division landed at Veszprém airport and Tököl airport, along with the 7th Guards Airborne Division. It helped suppress the Hungarian uprising during Operation Whirlwind and took part in fighting in Budapest between 4–7 November. The division left Hungary in late November. During Operation Whirlwind, the division was commanded by P.M. Ryabov. 24 soldiers from the division were killed during the crushing of the Hungarian uprising. 114th Guards Airborne Regiment company commander Mikhail Zinukov, 381st Guards Airborne Regiment deputy company commander Nikolai Muravlev, and 381st Guards Airborne Regiment platoon commander Pyotr Volokytin were posthumously awarded the title Hero of the Soviet Union for their actions. The division was relocated to Chernivtsi after leaving Hungary, with its 1295th Artillery Regiment in Kolomyia. On 30 April 1959, the 31st Guards Airborne Division was disbanded.

== Composition ==
In 1955, the division was composed of the following units.

- 109th Guards Airborne Regiment
- 114th Guards Airborne Regiment
- 381st Guards Airborne Regiment
- 1295th Guards Artillery Regiment
- 95th Separate Self-Propelled Artillery Battalion
- 764th Separate Antiaircraft Artillery Battalion
- 152nd Separate Antitank Artillery Battalion
- 716th Separate Guards Communications Battalion
- 157th Separate Guards Engineering Battalion
