= Medal "For the Capture of Vienna" =

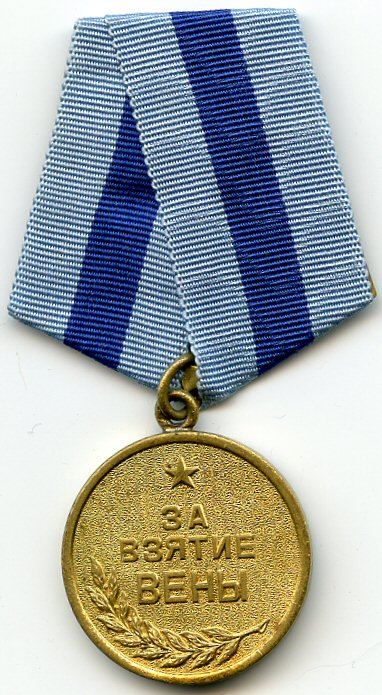
- Medal "For the Capture of Vienna" (obverse)
- Type: Campaign medal
- Awarded for: Participation in the capture of Vienna
- Presented by: USSR
- Eligibility: Citizens of the Soviet Union
- Status: No longer awarded
- Established: June 9, 1945

Highlights
- Total: 277,380
- Ribbon of the Medal "For the Capture of Vienna"

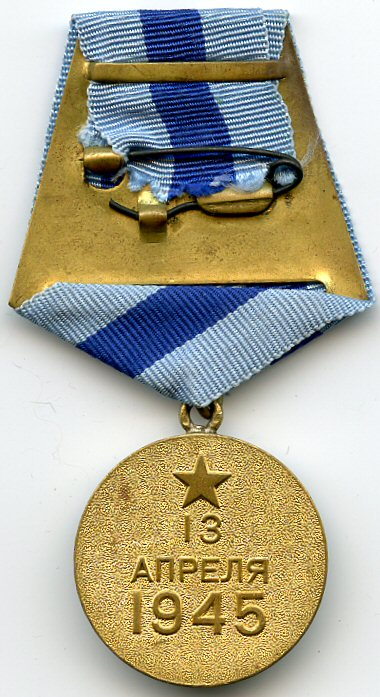
Reverse of the Medal "For the Capture of Vienna"

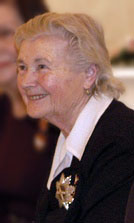
Wartime Marines medic Ekaterina Mikhailova-Demina, a recipient of the Medal "For the Capture of Vienna"

The Medal "For the Capture of Vienna" (Russian: Медаль «За взятие Вены») was a World War II campaign medal of the Soviet Union established on June 9, 1945 by decree of the Presidium of the Supreme Soviet of the USSR to satisfy the petition of the People's Commissariat for Defense of the Soviet Union to reward the participants of the battles for the capture of the city of Vienna from the armed forces of Nazi Germany. The medal's statute was amended on July 18, 1980 by decree of the Presidium of the Supreme Soviet of the USSR № 2523-X.

== Medal Statute ==
The Medal "For the Capture of Vienna" was awarded to soldiers of the Red Army, Navy, and troops of the NKVD, direct participants of the heroic assault and capture of Vienna as well as to the organizers and leaders of combat operations in the capture of this city.

Award of the medal was made on behalf of the Presidium of the Supreme Soviet of the USSR on the basis of documents attesting to actual participation in the capture of Vienna. Serving military personnel received the medal from their unit commander, retirees from military service received the medal from a regional, municipal or district military commissioner in the recipient's community.

The Medal "For the Capture of Vienna" was worn on the left side of the chest and in the presence of other awards of the USSR, was located immediately after the Medal "For the Capture of Königsberg". If worn in the presence of Orders or medals of the Russian Federation, the latter have precedence.

== Medal Description ==
The Medal "For the Capture of Vienna" was a 32mm in diameter circular brass medal with a raised rim on the obverse. On its pebbled obverse at the top, a relief five pointed star. Below the star, the relief inscription in bold letters on three rows "FOR THE CAPTURE OF VIENNA" (Russian: «ЗА ВЗЯТИЕ ВЕНЫ»). At the bottom, the relief image of a laurel branch going up the left circumference of the medal up to the second row of the inscription. On the reverse at the top, a relief plain five pointed star, below the star, the relief date in three rows "13 APRIL 1945" (Russian: «13 АПРЕЛЯ 1945»).

The Medal "For the Capture of Vienna" was secured by a ring through the medal suspension loop to a standard Soviet pentagonal mount covered by a 24mm wide silk moiré light blue ribbon with an 8mm wide central dark blue stripe.

== Recipients (partial list) ==
The individuals below were all recipients of the Medal "For the Capture of Vienna"

- Marines Chief Petty Officer Ekaterina Mikhailova-Demina
- Chief Marshal of Artillery Mitrofan Ivanovich Nedelin
- Marshal of the Soviet Union Rodion Yakovlevich Malinovsky
- Marshal of the Soviet Union Fyodor Ivanovich Tolbukhin
- Colonel General Nikolai Petrovich Kamanin
- World War 2 veteran physicist Vladimir Aleksandrovich Teplyakov
- Sapper Vladimir Fedorovich Chekalov
- World War 2 veteran, painter Piotr Konstantinovich Vasiliev
- War correspondent Pyotr Andreyevich Pavlenko
- Colonel Ivan Fedorovich Ladyga
- Army General Semion Pavlovich Ivanov
- Lieutenant General Georgy Timofeyevich Beregovoy
- Lieutenant Grigory Yakovlevich Baklanov
- Lieutenant General Kuzma Nikolayevich Derevyanko
- Military photographer Yevgeny Anan'evich Khaldei
- World War II veteran, film director and screenwriter Grigori Naumovich Chukhrai
- Sailor Georgi Aleksandrovich Yumatov
- Guards Captain Nikolai Semenovich Alferov
- Lieutenant Colonel Sergei Aleksandrovich Andryushchenko
- Major General Ilya Vasilevich Baldynov
- Colonel Alexander Nikitovich Belkin
- Lieutenant General Aleksandr Grigorevich Kapitohin
- Colonel General Andrei Grigorevich Kravchenko
- Captain Nikolai Petrovich Belousov
- Private Nikolai Savvich Stepanov
- Lieutenant Colonel Ivan Savelievich Bulaenko
- Major General Benjamin Vasilevich Volkov
- Colonel General Vasily Vasilevich Glagolev
- Lieutenant Colonel Ivan Illarionovich Dolgov
- Guards Warrant Officer Gennady Petrovich Zharkov
- Captain Pavel Khrisanfovich Maksimov
- Captain Roman, Eduard Arvidovich
- Army General Vasily Filippovich Margelov
- Petty Officer Nikolai Timofeevich Nevpryaga
- Lieutenant General Karp Sviridov
- Major General Grigory Flegontovich Sivkov
- Lieutenant Colonel Aleksandr Sergeyevich Trynin
- Warrant Officer Vladimir Ivanovich Fedorov

== See also ==
- Awards and decorations of the Soviet Union
