= 2nd Airborne Corps =

- Active: 1941–1942
- Country: Soviet Union
- Branch: Red Army
- Type: Airborne, infantry
- Engagements: World War II: Battle of Kiev

Commanders
- Notable commanders: Mikhail Tikhonov

The 2nd Airborne Corps was a corps of the Red Army during World War II. It fought in the Battle of Kiev. In the summer of 1942, the 2nd Airborne Corps became the 32nd Guards Rifle Division.

== History ==
The 2nd Airborne Corps was formed in April 1941 from the 2nd, 3rd and 4th Airborne Brigades based in the Kharkov Military District. By 1 June, the corps was fully manned, but due to the outbreak of Operation Barbarossa, the corps could not be fully equipped. Its first commander was Major General Fyodor Kharitonov. When the German invasion began, the corps was initially stationed in the rear area, but as the situation deteriorated it was sent to the front. The corps fought in the Battle of Kiev and suffered heavy losses. On 30 August, the corps was attached to the 40th Army. Its 2nd Airborne Brigade attacked a German battalion on the outskirts of Nehaivka, and in the pursuit reached Hill 130. The corps' 3rd Airborne Brigade captured Korelsky on the same day. In conjunction with a tank battalion, the 4th Airborne Brigade covered the approaches to Atyushov. On 3 September, the corps was positioned in the area of Putyvl and held the positions of Khiznyak, Hill 126.1, Zheldak, Gnilitsa, Huty and Novoselovka. The corps was fighting near Konotop on 10 September. Due to its losses, the corps was disbanded in September but quickly reformed under the command of Mikhail Tikhonov. On 14 May 1942, the corps was transferred to the Taman Peninsula to defend the coast. On 2 August, it was converted into the 32nd Guards Rifle Division.
