= Vasily Glagolev =

Soviet general (1896–1947)

Vasily Vasilyevich Glagolev
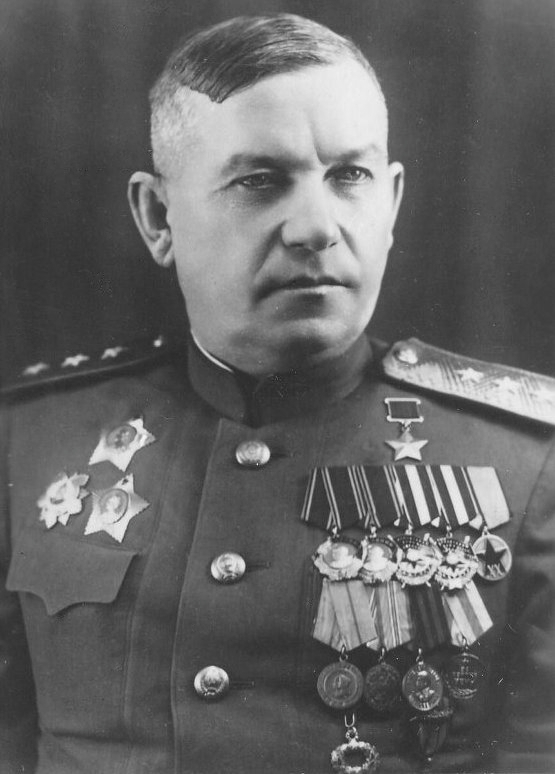
- Native name: Василий Васильевич Глаголев
- Born: 21 February 1896; Kaluga, Russian Empire
- Died: 21 September 1947 (aged 51) Moscow, Soviet Union
- Buried: Novodevichy Cemetery
- Allegiance: Russian Empire (1916–1917); Soviet Union (1918–1947)
- Branch: (Russian Empire) Imperial Russian Army; Red Army
- Service years: 1916–1947
- Rank: Colonel general
- Commands: 9th Army 46th Army; 31st Army; 9th Guards Army Soviet airborne
- Conflicts: World War I; Russian Civil War; World War II; Battle of Voronezh; Battle of the Caucasus; Battle of the Dnieper; Vitebsk-Orsha Offensive; Vienna Offensive; Prague Offensive
- Awards: Hero of the Soviet Union; Order of Lenin (2); Order of the Red Banner (2); Order of Suvorov, 1st class (2); Order of Kutuzov, 1st class Legion of Honour; Virtuti Militari

Vasily Vasilyevich Glagolev (Russian: Васи́лий Васи́льевич Глаго́лев; 21 February 1896 – 21 September 1947) was a Red Army Colonel general, Hero of the Soviet Union, and commander of the Soviet airborne (VDV). After initially serving in the Imperial Russian Army during World War I, Glagolev joined the Red Army in 1918. He rose to command the 42nd Cavalry Division on the Crimean Front in World War II, going on to command the 73rd and 176th Rifle Divisions as well as the 10th Guards Rifle Corps. Glagolev briefly became the commander of the 9th Army in February 1943 before being transferred to command of the 46th Army, which he would lead until May 1944. He became the 31st Army's commander and led it during the Vitebsk–Orsha Offensive. In January 1945, Glagolev commanded the 9th Guards Army, composed of Soviet airborne divisions converted into infantry. In April 1946, he became the commander of the Soviet airborne forces and died on in 1947 during exercises.

== Early life ==
Vasily Glagolev was born on 21 February 1896 in Kaluga. His father was a physician but died when Glagolev was still young. He graduated from elementary school and a technical school in Kaluga. In March 1916, he joined the Imperial Russian Army. He became a senior intelligence non-commissioned officer and gunner in the 1st Siberian Artillery Brigade of the 10th Army on the Western Front. In February 1918, Glagolev was demobilized, after which he worked as a laborer.

In August 1918, Glagolev joined the Red Army. He fought in the 1st Cavalry Regiment and 3rd Cavalry Regiment of the Kaluga-Moscow Rifle Division. From May 1919, Glagolev fought against elements of the Ural Cossacks and the Orenburg Cossacks, but soon became sick and returned to Kaluga for treatment. From October 1919 to March 1920, he served in the 140th Internal Security Battalion, but was ill again. In June 1920, he became a sergeant in the 1st Reserve Cavalry Regiment and 68th Cavalry Regiment of the 12th Cavalry Division, fighting in the North Caucasus.

== Interwar ==
In 1921, Glagolev graduated from the 3rd Baku Command Courses. Between 1921 and 1924, he was a platoon commander, deputy squadron commander and intelligence chief of the 68th Cavalry Regiment of the 12th Cavalry Division. He commanded a squadron in the same regiment and later transferred to the 68th Cavalry Regiment. Glagolev commanded a squadron of the 2nd Separate Cavalry Brigade from December 1924. In 1925, Glagolev joined the Communist Party of the Soviet Union. In 1926, he graduated from the Novocherkassk cavalry commanders refresher course. In June 1931, he became the head of cavalry tactics and the Novocherkassk cavalry commanders refresher course. In January 1934, Glagolev became the commander and commissar of the 76th Cavalry Regiment. In July 1937, he became the divisional chief of staff. In August 1939, he commanded the 157th Rifle Division and 42nd Cavalry Division. In 1941, Glagolev graduated from the higher academic courses at the Frunze Military Academy.

== World War II ==
In January 1942, the 42nd Cavalry Division was transferred to the Crimean Front. Glagolev became the commander of the 73rd Rifle Division in February 1942, which he led during the Battle of Voronezh. In July, the division was encircled near Millerovo but broke out in August while suffering heavy losses. After the division's disbandment in September, Glagolev became the commander of the 176th Rifle Division in October. He led the division during the Nalckik-Ordzhonikidze Defensive Operation during the Battle of the Caucasus. In November, he became the commander of the 10th Guards Rifle Corps, which Glagolev led until February 1943. For his leadership in the Caucasus, Glagolev was awarded the Order of the Red Banner on 13 December 1942.

On 27 January 1943, Glagolev was promoted to Major general and in February became the commander of the 9th Army. In March, he was transferred to command the 46th Army, which he led during the Donbass Strategic Offensive. In September, the army fought in the Battle of the Dnieper. Between 25 and 29 September, the 46th Army crossed the Dnieper, seizing a bridgehead near the village of Aula in Dnipropetrovsk Oblast. After holding the bridgehead against German counterattacks, the army, as part of the offensive, captured Dnipropetrovsk. For his leadership during the Battle of the Dnieper, Glagolev was awarded the title Hero of the Soviet Union and the Order of Lenin on 1 November. He continued to lead the army during the Nikopol–Krivoi Rog Offensive of January 1944, the Bereznegovatoye–Snigirevka Offensive in March and the Odessa Offensive.

In May 1944, Glagolev was transferred to command the 31st Army. He led the army during Operation Bagration and its Vitebsk–Orsha and Minsk Offensives. In October, the army fought in the Gumbinnen Operation. In January 1945, Glagolev became the commander of the 9th Guards Army, composed of airborne divisions converted to infantry. The army advanced into Hungary as part of the 2nd Ukrainian Front and then the 3rd Ukrainian Front. It fought in the Balaton Offensive, Vienna Offensive and the Prague Offensive.

== Postwar ==
After the end of World War II, Glagolev continued to command the 9th Guards Army, now part of the Central Group of Forces. In April 1946, he became the commander of the Soviet airborne and served as a deputy at the 2nd congress of the Supreme Soviet of the Soviet Union in the same year. Glagolev died on 21 September 1947 during exercises and was buried in Novodevichy Cemetery.

== Honors and awards ==
Glagolev received the following honors and awards.

=== Soviet ===
Hero of the Soviet Union (1 November 1943)
Order of Lenin, twice (1 November 1943, 21 February 1945)
Order of the Red Banner, twice (13 December 1942, 3 November 1944)
Order of Suvorov, 1st class, twice (19 March 1944, 28 April 1945)
Order of Kutuzov, 1st class (4 July 1944)
Medal "For the Defence of Sevastopol"
Medal "For the Defence of the Caucasus"
Medal "For the Victory over Germany in the Great Patriotic War 1941–1945"
Medal "For the Capture of Vienna"
Medal "For the Liberation of Prague"
Jubilee Medal "XX Years of the Workers' and Peasants' Red Army"

=== Foreign ===
Legion of Honour, Commander
Virtuti Militari, Commander's Cross
