= Livensky Uyezd (Oryol Governorate) =

Livensky Uyezd (Ли́венский уе́зд) was one of the subdivisions of the Oryol Governorate of the Russian Empire. It was situated in the southeastern part of the governorate. Its administrative centre was Livny.

== Demographics ==
At the time of the Russian Empire Census of 1897, Livensky Uyezd had a population of 290,192. Of these, 99.8% spoke Russian and 0.1% Yiddish as their native language.
