= 32nd Guards Motor Rifle Division =

Motor rifle division of the Soviet military

32nd Guards Rifle Division (1942 – c. 1946) 66th Guards Mechanized Division (c. 1946 – 1957) 114th Guards Motor Rifle Division (1957–1965) 32nd Guards Motor Rifle Division (1965–1989)
- Active: 1942–1989
- Country: Soviet Union
- Branch: Red Army (1942-1946); Soviet Army (1946-1989)
- Size: Division
- Garrison/HQ: Kalinin (Tver), Kalinin Oblast
- Engagements: World War II: Battle of the Caucasus; Crimean Offensive; East Prussian Offensive
- Decorations: Order of the Red Banner; Order of Suvorov
- Battle honours: Taman

Commanders
- Notable commanders: Mikhail Tikhonov

The 32nd Guards Motor Rifle Division was a mechanised infantry division of the Soviet Ground Forces.

It was descended from Red Army World War II formations. It traces its history to the establishment of the 2nd Airborne Corps in May 1942. Mikhail Tikhonov commanded both the 2nd Airborne Corps and the later 32nd Guards Rifle Division. The division fought at Krasnodar, on the Kuban, and in Crimea prior to fighting in Kurland. On 1 June 1942 it was part of 47th Army, North Caucasus Front. The division was with the 2nd Guards Army of the 3rd Belorussian Front in May 1945.

After the war it was reduced for a time to the 5th Independent Guards Rifle Brigade. It then became the 66th Guards Mechanised Division and then the 114th Guards Motor Rifle Division in June 1957. The 114th Guards MRD became the 32nd Guards Motor Rifle Division on 17 November 1964 at Kalinin. The division included the 416th, 418th, and 420th Guards MRRs and 378th Tank Regiment. It was based in the Moscow Military District from 1957 to 1993.

In October 1989 the division was renamed the 5210th Guards Weapons and Equipment Storage Base. The storage base was itself disbanded in 1993.
