= 39th Guards Airborne Corps =

39th Guards Airborne Corps 39th Guards Rifle Corps
- Active: 1944–1955
- Country: Soviet Union
- Branch: Red Army
- Type: airborne, infantry
- Size: corps
- Engagements: World War II: Vienna Offensive; Prague Offensive
- Battle honours: Vienna; Order of the Red Banner

Commanders
- Notable commanders: Mikhail Tikhonov Alexander Kazankin

The 39th Guards Airborne Corps was a Red Army airborne corps. First formed in August 1944, it was converted to infantry in January 1945 and fought during World War II in the Vienna Offensive and the Prague Offensive. Postwar, it was converted back into an airborne unit and served in Ukraine before its disbandment in 1955.

== History ==
The 39th Airborne Corps was formed on 9 August 1944 under the command of Mikhail Tikhonov in Kalinin City. It was converted to infantry on 5 January 1945 and became part of the 9th Guards Army. The corps fought in the Vienna Offensive, where it participated in the capture of Vienna. For his leadership, Tikhonov was awarded the title Hero of the Soviet Union. The corps was also given the honorary title "Vienna".

In July 1945, the corps was transferred to Bila Tserkva. On 10 June 1946, it became airborne again. Its headquarters moved to Kryvyi Rih on 11 May 1947. The 31st Guards Airborne Division was activated on 1 October 1948 from the 356th Guards Airborne Regiment to form a third division in the corps. The corps was disbanded on 12 January 1955.

== Commanders ==
The corps was commanding by the following officers.

- Lieutenant general Mikhail Tikhonov (9 August 1944-June 1946)
- Lieutenant general Alexander Kazankin (June 1946-October 1947)
- Lieutenant general Ivan Bezugly (3 February 1948 – 7 February 1950)
- Major general Nikolay Tavartkiladze (7 February 1950 – 27 January 1951)
- Lieutenant general Vasily Shatilov (27 January 1951 – 12 January 1955)

== Composition ==
The corps was composed of the following units in January 1945.

- 100th Guards Rifle Division
- 107th Guards Rifle Division
- 114th Guards Rifle Division, Borovukha, Vitebsk Oblast - to 8th Guards Airborne Corps October 1948

The corps was composed of the following units in 1947.

- 100th Guards Airborne Division
- 107th Guards Airborne Division
