= Alexander Kapitokhin =

Soviet military officer (1892–1958)

- Александр Григорьевич Капитохин
- Born: 6 June 1892; Kamenka-Loginovka village, Yeletsky Uyezd, Orel Governorate, Russian Empire
- Died: 13 August 1958 (aged 66); Moscow, Soviet Union
- Military career
- Allegiance: Russian Empire; Soviet Union
- Branch: Russian Imperial Army; Soviet Army
- Service years: 1914–1917; 1918–1950
- Rank: Lieutenant general
- Commands: 95th Rifle Division; 10th Airborne Corps; 8th Guards Airborne Division; Soviet airborne 38th Guards Airborne Corps; 38th Guards Rifle Corps
- Conflicts: World War I; Russian Civil War; Estonian War of Independence; Polish–Soviet War; World War II; Siege of Sevastopol; Dnieper Airborne Operation
- Awards: Order of Lenin

Alexander Grigoryevich Kapitokhin (Russian: Александр Григорьевич Капитохин; 6 June 1892 – 13 August 1958) was a Red Army lieutenant general. Kapitokhin commanded a sector in the final defence of Sevastopol and was later the commander of the Soviet Airborne Troops (VDV). He was awarded the Order of Lenin and three Orders of the Red Banner.

== Early life ==
Kapitokhin was born in Kamenka-Loginovka village, Yeletsky Uyezd, Oryol Governorate. He graduated from the fourth grade of rural school. He studied at the teacher's school for three years and graduated in 1909 with the rank of primary school teacher. In 1911 he graduated from another teachers' college and became a teacher of Russian language and literature in Borisoglebovskoe village, where he worked until conscription in 1914.

== World War I ==
Kapitokhin was drafted into the Imperial Russian Army in October 1914. He became a private in the 147th Infantry Reserve Regiment, based in Kuznetsk. From May to October 1915, he was educated at the Chuguyev Junker School and graduated as a lieutenant. From June 1916, he was a company commander in Irkutsk, first with the 10th Siberian Reserve Rifle Regiment and then with the 11th Siberian Reserve Rifle Regiment. In September 1916, Kapitokhin was sent to the Western Front, where he fought with the 31st Siberian Rifle Regiment. In December 1917, he was demobilized.

== Russian Civil War ==
Kapitokhin was an instructor in the Eletsky union of Consumer Societies. In December 1918 he joined the Red Army and was appointed the commander of a battalion of the 99th Rifle Regiment of the 11th Rifle Division. In March 1919 Kapitokhin was transferred to the same post in the 98th Rifle Regiment. As part of the 11th Rifle Division, Kapitokhin fought in the Estonian War of Independence and against forces commanded by Stanisław Bułak-Bałachowicz. In July he commanded the assault group of the Western Army. In October he was assistant commander and then commander of the 23rd Brigade of the 8th Rifle Division. Kapitokhin fought in the Polish–Soviet War and was captured in January 1920 in Bobruisk. He spent four months in prison, but escaped during the Soviet May offensive. Kapitokhin was awarded his first Order of the Red Banner during the same year. In October 1920 and February 1921 he commanded the 1st Separate Rifle Brigade on the Caucasian Front.

== Interwar period ==
Kapitokhin served with the 6th Rifle Division in the Belorussian SSR, where he was the assistant commander of the 16th and 18th Rifle Regiments. In November 1923, he was sent to study at the Red Army infantry commander school. After graduation in September 1924, Kapitokhin was demobilized. He went to the Frunze Military Academy, from which he graduated in October 1931. He became a reservist and was the chief of the Office of Defence Mobilization of the Central Union of Consumer Societies. Kapitokhin was then the chief of the weather station on Uyedineniya Island. On 24 September 1939, he became the deputy head of the Chief Directorate of the Northern Sea Route. For his work in the Arctic, Kapitokhin was awarded the Order of the Badge of Honour and given the title "Honorary Polar Explorer". In 1940 he was promoted to colonel.

== World War II ==
After Operation Barbarossa Kapitokhin was placed at the disposal of the Military Council of the Odessa Defence Region. In August 1941 he was appointed commander of the 161st Rifle Regiment of the 95th Rifle Division in the Separate Coastal Army. In March 1942, he became the commander of the division. Kapitokhin fought in the Siege of Sevastopol and commanded the 4th sector of the city's defences during the final assault. On 4 July he was evacuated by submarine to Novorossiysk. For actions in the defence of Sevastopol, Kapitokhin was awarded the Order of the Red Banner.

On 29 August Kapitokhin became the commander of the 10th Airborne Corps in the Moscow Military District. On 10 November 1942 he was promoted to major general. On 8 December 1942 Kapitokhin became commander of the 8th Guards Airborne Division. On 23 March, he was awarded the Order of Suvorov, 3d class. In July 1943 the division fought in the Battle of Kursk. In August he became the commander of the Soviet airborne troops. In September 1943 Kapitokhin organized the Dnieper Airborne Operation. The operation was a failure, and Kapitokhin was demoted afterwards for alleged incompetence.

In August 1944 Kapitokhin was appointed commander of the 38th Guards Airborne Corps as part of a separate airborne army. On 5 November, he was promoted to lieutenant general. In November 1944 he was also awarded the Order of the Red Banner. In January 1945 the corps became part of the 9th Guards Army. Until February 1945 it was held in Stavka Strategic Reserve. In March the corps became part of the 3rd Ukrainian Front and fought in the Vienna Offensive. Kapitokhin was an adviser with the Bulgarian First Army and the Yugoslav 3rd Army. At the end of the war, Kapitokhin was in Dalmatia.

== Postwar ==
Kapitokhin was appointed chief of the Tambov Suvorov Military School in November 1945. In July 1950, he was discharged due to illness. Kapitokhin died in Moscow on 13 August 1958 and is buried in the Vagankovo Cemetery.
