= Terentiy Parafilo =

Soviet general (1901–1943)

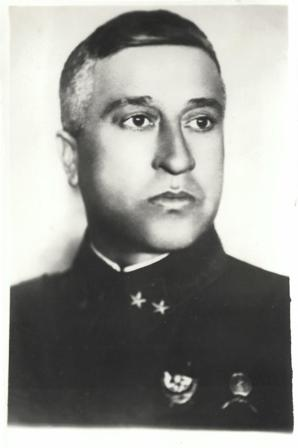
Парафило Терентий Михайлович

Terentiy Mikhaylovich Parafilo (Russian: Тере́нтий Михай́лович Парафи́ло; 28 October 1901 – 24 June 1943) was a Soviet military commander. Parafilo is primarily remembered for his service during World War II, in which he first participated as commander of a Naval Infantry brigade attached to the Baltic Sea Fleet during Nazi Germany's incursion into the Baltics, then as a major general commanding the shore-based 7th Airborne Guards Division of the Soviet Army.

== Biography ==
Trentiy Parafilo was born on 28 October 1901 in Brovarky, in Kremenchugsky Uyezd of Poltava Governorate of the Russian Empire (present-day Ukraine). He enjoyed a long military career, having served in the Soviet Army as a simple soldier long before World War II.

In 1940, Colonel Parafilo was assigned to command the newly formed 1st Naval Infantry Brigade, headquartered in Daugavpils. Following the German Army Group North's rapid advances against the surprised Soviet forces during the first stages of Operation Barbarossa, Parafilo's brigade, effectively constituting the core of the Soviet defense of the western sector of Tallinn, found itself encircled, but managed to escape successfully.

Parafilo was appointed commander of the 7th Guards Airborne Division on 8 December 1942, participating in countering the German army on the Volkhov Front, formed in order to halt the German advance towards Leningrad. Heavily wounded in the fighting, the major general died on 24 June 1943.
