= 114th Guards Airborne Division =

14th Guards Airborne Division (Sep 1944 – Dec 1944) 114th Guards Rifle Division (Dec 1944 – Jun 1946) 114th Guards Airborne Division
- Active: September 1944 – April 1956
- Country: Soviet Union
- Branch: Red Army
- Type: Airborne, infantry
- Size: Division
- Engagements: World War II: Vienna Offensive; Prague Offensive
- Battle honours: Vienna; Order of the Red Banner

Commanders
- Notable commanders: Leonid Kolobov

The 114th Guards Airborne Division was a Red Army airborne division. It was first formed as the 14th Guards Airborne Division. In December 1944, it was converted to the 114th Guards Rifle Division and became an airborne unit again in June 1946.

== History ==
In September 1944, the second formation of the 14th Guards Airborne Division was created from the 202nd Airborne Brigade in the Moscow Military District, part of the 39th Guards Airborne Corps. On 25 December, it was converted to infantry and became the 114th Guards Rifle Division. Its first commander was Vasily Polikarpovich Ivanov.

On 10 January 1945, the 39th Guards Rifle Corps was transferred to Hungary. During Operation Spring Awakening, the division created defensive positions on the eastern bank of the Danube from Dunavecse to Ráckeve. On 23 March, the division captured Pápa, for which it was awarded the Order of the Red Banner. It was on the Austrian border by 1 April and captured Zillingdorf. The division attacked on the corps' right flank during the Vienna Offensive. After the capture of Vienna, the division fought in the Prague Offensive.

After the end of World War II, the division returned to the Belorussian Military District. From 15 June to 1 July 1946, the division was converted into the 114th Guards Airborne Division at Borovukha in Vitebsk Oblast. In October 1948, it became part of the 8th Guards Airborne Corps. On 4 April 1956, the division was disbanded. The 350th Guards Airborne Regiment and the 357th Guards Airborne Regiment became part of the 103rd Guards Airborne Division.

== Composition ==
The 114th Guards Rifle Division was composed of the following units:

- 350th Guards Rifle Regiment
- 353rd Guards Rifle Regiment
- 357th Guards Rifle Regiment
- 404th Guards Artillery Regiment
