= 4th Guards Airborne Division =

111th Guards Rifle Division (28 June 1945–c. 1946–1947) 4th Guards Airborne Division (8 December 1942–28 June 1945)
- Battle flag of the division
- Active: 8 December 1942–c. 1946–1947
- Country: Soviet Union
- Branch: Red Army / Soviet Army
- Type: Airborne
- Role: Infantry
- Engagements: World War II; Eastern Front
- Decorations: Order of the Red Banner; Order of Suvorov, 2nd class; Order of Bogdan Khmelnitsky, 2nd class
- Battle honours: Ovruch

The 4th Guards Airborne Division (Russian: 4-я гвардейская воздушно-десантная дивизия) was an airborne division of the Red Army that fought as infantry during World War II.

Formed in December 1942 from three airborne brigades, the division spent the next few months training for airborne operations. However, it first saw combat as an infantry unit in the Demyansk Offensive in late February 1943, then helped defend Ponyri during the Battle of Kursk. The division fought in Operation Kutuzov and advanced west in the Battle of the Dnieper, during which it captured Pryluky and crossed the Dnieper. It received the Ovruch honorific for the capture of the key rail junction during the Battle of Kiev. The division then fought in the Zhitomir–Berdichev Offensive and the Korsun-Shevchenkovsky Offensive in late 1943 and early 1944.

The 4th Guards received the Order of the Red Banner and the Order of Bogdan Khmelnitsky for actions during the Uman–Botoșani Offensive, then fought in the Second Jassy–Kishinev Offensive and received the Order of Suvorov. The division advanced westward into Hungary, fighting in the Battle of Debrecen and the Budapest Offensive in late 1944. In the last months of the war it fought in the Bratislava–Brno Offensive and ended the war fighting in the Prague Offensive. Shortly after the end of the war, the division was redesignated as the 111th Guards Rifle Division, and disbanded in 1946–1947.

== History ==
The 4th Guards Airborne Division was formed by an order of 8 December 1942 at Stupino, Moscow Oblast from the 1st Airborne Brigade of the 1st Airborne Corps and the independent 2nd and 5th Maneuver Airborne Brigades, one of eight new airborne divisions. It was commanded by Major General Pyotr Alexandrov, the former commander of the 1st Airborne Corps, whose headquarters became the division headquarters. The division included the 9th, 12th, and 15th Guards Airborne Regiments, as well as the 1st Guards Airborne Artillery Regiment. For the rest of December and January 1943, the division conducted parachute jumps and trained in tactics, preparing for operations in the German rear. In February 1943, it was transferred from the Reserve of the Supreme High Command (RVGK) to the Northwestern Front, joining the 1st Shock Army. The 4th Guards were alerted for the movement on 5 February and were transported by truck towards Staraya Russa. The division entered combat on 26 February during the Demyansk Offensive, and in the second half of March transferred to the 53rd Army of the RVGK on the Kursk direction. In mid-April the army became part of the Steppe Military District. The 4th Guards Airborne fought in the Battle of Kursk as part of the 13th Army of the Central Front, distinguishing itself in the repulse of the German attack at Ponyri. It then fought in the Operation Kutuzov.

During the advance into left-bank Ukraine, the division fought as part of the 60th Army of the Central Front. During the Chernigov–Pripyat Offensive, it participated alongside other units in the recapture of Pryluky on 18 September. Elements of the division crossed the Dnieper on 1 October, and fought fiercely to hold and expand the bridgehead in the area of Horodyshche, Gubin, and Dytiatky, 20 kilometers south of Chernobyl. At the end of October it transferred back to the 13th Army, now part of the 1st Ukrainian Front. With the 13th Army, the division fought in the Battle of Kiev, distinguishing itself when it captured Ovruch and the significant rail junction towards Polesia on the night of 19 November, for which it received the Ovruch honorific on the same day.

Subsequently, the division fought in the Zhitomir–Berdichev Offensive, and was transferred to the 40th Army of the 1st Ukrainian Front (transferred to the 2nd Ukrainian Front on 21 February) in the second half of January 1944, with which it fought in the Korsun–Shevchenkovsky Offensive. During the Uman–Botoșani Offensive, the division broke through the Axis defenses at Oratovka and Yushkovtsy, 15 to 20 kilometers northwest of Tsybuliv on 10 March, then crossed the Southern Bug and took Bratslav on 17 March. It crossed the Dniester southwest of Mohyliv-Podilskyi on 25 March, then developed the offensive alongside the rest of the 40th Army and the 11th Guards Tank Corps of the 1st Ukrainian Front to capture Khotyn on 3 April. For its "exemplary fulfillment of command tasks, valor, and courage" the division was awarded the Order of the Red Banner on 8 April, and for its actions in the capture of Khotyn it received the Order of Bogdan Khmelnitsky, 2nd class, on 18 April.

During the Second Jassy–Kishinev Offensive in mid-1944, the division fought with the 27th Army of the 2nd Ukrainian Front. For its "exemplary fulfillment of command tasks, valor, and courage" during the offensive, the division was awarded the Order of Suvorov, 2nd class, on 15 September. Between October and January 1945 it fought in the Battle of Debrecen and the Budapest Offensive. From 17 February to the end of the war, it operated as part of the 7th Guards Army of the 4th Ukrainian Front. During the Bratislava–Brno Offensive, it fought on Czechoslovak territory, and captured Bratislava on 4 April. The division ended the war fighting in the Prague Offensive in early May. For their actions during the war, several thousand of its soldiers received orders and medals, and nine were made Heroes of the Soviet Union.

On 28 June, the division was redesignated as the 111th Guards Rifle Division when several airborne divisions formed in 1942 that had fought as infantry for the rest of the war were redesignated as rifle divisions. Its regiments became the 2nd, 7th, and 16th Guards Rifle Regiments, and the 466th Guards and 471st Guards Artillery Regiments. Around this time, it transferred to the 4th Guards Army of the Central Group of Forces. The division was disbanded in 1946–1947 shortly after the army was withdrawn to the Odessa Military District.

== Commanders ==
The following officers commanded the division:

- Major General Pyotr Alexandrov (December 8, 1942 – 18 April 18, 1943)
- Major General Alexander Rumyantsev (April 19, 1943 – September 20, 1944)
- Colonel Alexey Kostrikin (September 21 – October 28, 1944)
- Colonel Nikolay Yeryomin (promoted to Major General April 20,1945; October 29, 1944 – May, 1946)
