= 9th Guards Army =

- Active: 1945–1946
- Country: Soviet Union
- Branch: Red Army
- Type: Combined arms
- Size: 3 rifle corps
- Part of: 2nd Ukrainian Front; 3rd Ukrainian Front
- Engagements: World War II: Vienna Offensive; Prague Offensive

Commanders
- Notable commanders: Vasily Glagolev

The 9th Guards Army was a field army of the Red Army during World War II, which fought in the Vienna Offensive and the Prague Offensive at the end of the war. The army was formed in January 1945 and included airborne divisions converted into infantry. Postwar, the army headquarters became Soviet airborne headquarters.

== History ==
=== Formation ===
The 9th Guards Army was formed on 5 January 1945 under the command of Vasily Glagolev as directed by the Stavka directive of 18 December 1944. It was formed from the headquarters of the 7th Army and the Separate Airborne Army. It was composed of the 37th, 38th and 39th Guards Rifle Corps. In February, the army was transferred to southeastern Hungary, near Budapest. It became part of the 2nd Ukrainian Front on 27 February to participate in the Vienna Offensive.

=== Vienna and Prague Offensives ===
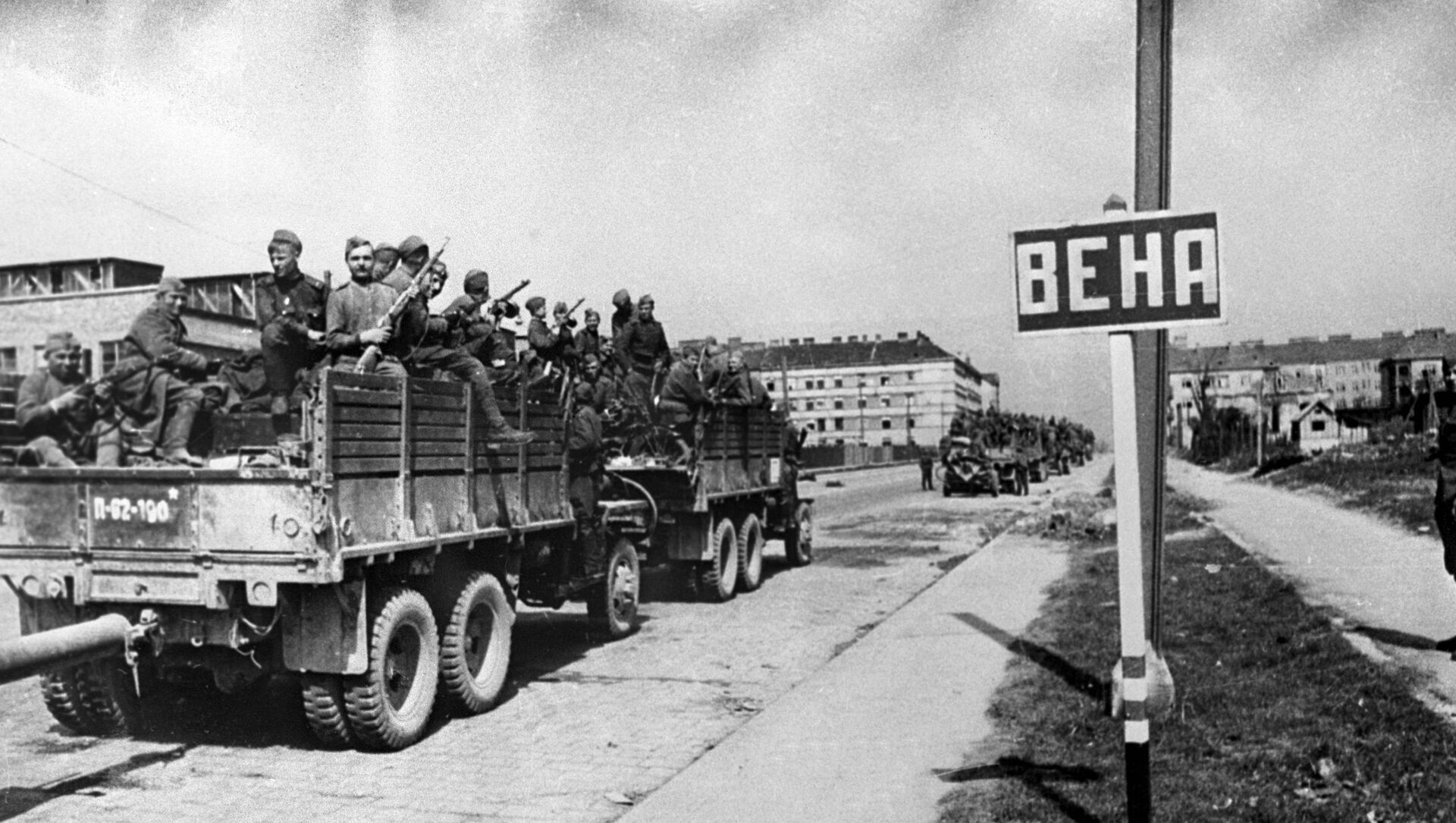
Soviet troops during the Vienna Offensive

It was transferred to the 3rd Ukrainian Front on 9 March. Between 8 and 14 March the army was moved from the Kecslemet area across the Danube into the Zámoly sector, replacing the 4th Guards Army. Between 16 March and 15 April, the army fought in the Vienna Offensive. Units of the army broke through German defences north of Székesfehérvár in conjunction with the 4th Guards Army. Advancing in the left flank and rear of the 6th Panzer Army, the 9th Guards Army broke through other German units between Lake Balaton and Velence. For the assault on Vienna, the army's 39th Guards Rifle Corps would follow the attack of the 6th Guards Tank Army in the southwestern sector. The 38th Guards Rifle Corps was to cut the Vienna-Linz road and use two divisions to protect the attack from the west. The 37th Guards Rifle Corps protected the assault force's left flank. The 9th Guards Army attacked the northwestern road out of Vienna in conjunction with the 6th Guards Tank Army and broke German resistance in early April. On 13 April, the army helped capture Vienna. The army then fought in the Prague Offensive, where it captured Znojmo on 8 May in conjunction with the 7th Guards Army. It also captured Retz and Písek, ending the war on the Elbe.

=== Postwar ===
The army had its headquarters in Szolnok from July 1945 to June 1946 and was part of the Central Group of Forces. In 1946, its headquarters became the Soviet airborne headquarters and its corps were converted into airborne corps, while rifle divisions became airborne divisions.

== Composition ==
The army was composed of the following units in February 1945.

- 37th Guards Rifle Corps
  - 98th Guards Rifle Division
  - 99th Guards Rifle Division
  - 103rd Guards Rifle Division
- 38th Guards Rifle Corps
  - 104th Guards Rifle Division
  - 105th Guards Rifle Division
  - 106th Guards Rifle Division
- 39th Guards Rifle Corps
  - 100th Guards Rifle Division
  - 107th Guards Rifle Division
  - 114th Guards Rifle Division
- 35th Guards Gun Artillery Brigade
- 36th Anti-Tank Artillery Brigade
- 319th Guards Mortar Regiment
- 321st Guards Mortar Regiment
- 322nd Guards Mortar Regiment
- 1513th Self-Propelled Artillery Regiment
- 1523rd Self-Propelled Artillery Regiment
- 1524th Self-Propelled Artillery Regiment
- 15th Engineer-Sapper Brigade
- 7th Separate Flamethrower Battalion
