= 100th Guards Rifle Division =

15th Guards Airborne Division (1943–1944) 100th Guards Rifle Division (1944–1946) 100th Guards Airborne Division (1946–1955)
- Active: 1943–1955
- Country: Soviet Union
- Branch: Army
- Type: Airborne infantry
- Size: Division
- Engagements: World War II: Vyborg-Petrozavodsk Offensive; Operation Spring Awakening; Vienna Offensive
- Decorations: Order of the Red Banner
- Battle honours: Svir

Commanders
- Notable commanders: Vasilii Andreevich Leshchinin; Ivan Alekseevich Makarenko

The 100th Guards Rifle Division was an elite Red Army airborne infantry division during World War II. The division fought in the Vyborg–Petrozavodsk Offensive and the Vienna Offensive. Postwar, it was designated as an airborne division and disbanded in 1955.

== Creation ==
From the beginning of the war, the Soviet Army strongly emphasized the development of airborne forces and their use behind enemy lines. Paradrops were often conducted in multi-regimental strengths, the most notable of these being the Vyaz'ma paradrop in 1942 and the Dnieper-Bukrinsk paradrop in 1943.

The 15th Guards Airborne Division (Russian: 15-я гвардейская воздушно-десантная дивизия) was created in June 1943 and initially deployed in the cities of Ramenskoye and Zvenigorod. It incorporated three airborne brigades (9th, 10th and 12th Airborne Brigades) and was commanded by Major General Vasilii Andreevich Leshchinin.

On 19 January 1944, the division was renamed the 100th Guards Rifle Division and its component brigades renamed the 298th, 301st and 304th Guards Rifle Regiments. In addition to this core strength, the division had two artillery regiments and various complementary contingents, including communications. By mid-1944, its strength reached 12,000 men. This number was unusually high for a formation of this type, as Red Army divisions usually had strengths of about 6,000 to 7,000.

== Combat history ==
In June 1944, the division was sent to the Karelian Front to take place in an operation aimed at clearing Karelia of Finnish forces. The attack started on June 21, 1944, with the 100th Guards Rifle Division performing a force-crossing of the Svir River. After three days of violent attacks, Finnish defenses were overrun and the Leningrad Oblast completely liberated.

The offensive resumed shortly afterwards, and had to pass through the former Mannerheim Line, reinforced between 1941 and 1944. Taking heavy casualties, the division advanced north and arrived to the shore of Vidlitsa river on July 1, 1944. A day later, the river was crossed in force and the division resumed its offensive. However, it was stopped three days later by another river coupled with extensive defensive fortification. After yet another assault crossing and heavy fight, the offensive stopped on July 14, 1944, and the division assumed a defensive stance until mid-August. The operation lasted in total for 40 days, with the division advancing more than 200 kilometers starting from its initial positions around Leningrad. The Svir River, crossed in force by the division, would later give its name to the unit.

In August 1944, the division was relocated to Kalinin and renamed the 100th Guards Svir Airborne Division, only to be renamed back to 100th Guards Svir Rifle Division a few months later. After receiving reinforcements and a new commander, Major General Ivan Alekseevich Makarenko, the division was transported to Hungary in January 1945 and integrated into the 9th Guards Army's 39th Guards Rifle Corps.

Starting from mid-February, the division was part of the Soviet reserve force during the German Operation Frühlingserwachen, east of Lake Balaton, in which the 6th SS Panzer Army was trying to get through Soviet defenses. On March 16, 1945, the Wehrmacht's offensive was stopped, and an offensive on Vienna was launched immediately afterwards. The 100th Division had the task of "cleaning up" encircled pockets of German resistance. On April 2, 1945, the division started its march towards Vienna. Five days later, the troops arrived within sight of Vienna, which was turned into a fortress defended by the II SS Panzer Corps and ad hoc training and anti-aircraft units.

The operation aimed at capturing Vienna started on April 7, 1945. The division occupied the southern outskirts of the city, and then executed an enveloping maneuver westwards, going around the city through the Vienna woods, engaging in heavy combat in the center of the city, seizing key targets such as the railway terminal and the parliament, and force-crossing the Danube. After five days of violent urban warfare, Vienna fell on April 13, 1945.

By early May, the division was committed to the offensive towards Prague, still in the hands of the Wehrmacht. It crossed the Czech border on May 10, meeting American forces advancing from the west.

== Post-war ==
After the war, the division moved from Czechoslovakia to Hungary and was located there until April 1946. In 1946, it was relocated to Belaya Tserkov' and there on 7 June 1946 renamed the 100th Guards Svir Red Banner Airborne Division (100-я гвардейская Свирская Краснознамённая воздушно-десантная дивизия). In 1947, it was yet again relocated to the cities of Kremenchug and Kirovograd. In 1955, following a program of reduction in strength of the Red Army, the division was disbanded. The 109th Guards Airborne Regiment moved to the 31st Guards Airborne Division. The 301st Guards Airborne Regiment transferred to the 107th Guards Airborne Division.
