= 8th Guards Airborne Division =

8th Guards Airborne Division (8 Dec 1942 – 27 Dec 1944) 107th Guards Rifle Division (27 Dec 1944 – 6 Jul 1946) 107th Guards Airborne Division (7 Jun 1946 – 1959)
- Active: 1942–1959
- Country: Soviet Union
- Branch: Red Army / Soviet Army
- Type: Airborne/Infantry
- Size: Division
- Engagements: World War II; Demyansk Offensive; Operation Kutuzov; Battle of the Dnieper; Uman–Botoșani Offensive; Second Jassy–Kishinev Offensive; Budapest Offensive; Vienna Offensive
- Decorations: Order of the Red Banner; Order of Kutuzov, 2nd class
- Battle honours: Pervomaisk

The 8th Guards Airborne Division was an airborne division of the Red Army during World War II. On 27 December 1944, it was renamed the 107th Guards Rifle Division. It became the 107th Guards Airborne Division on 7 June 1946, before being disbanded in 1959.

== History ==
The 8th Guards Airborne Division was formed on 8 December 1942 from the 10th Airborne Corps in the Moscow Military District. The personnel of the airborne division received training in airborne tactics. Major general Alexander Kapitokhin, commander of the 10th Airborne Corps, became the division's first commander. In February 1943, the division was transferred to the Northwestern Front, where it became part of the 68th Army, fighting in the Demyansk Offensive.

On 24 April 1943, the division was withdrawn from the front and moved to Voronezh as part of the Central Front . At the beginning of May, the division became part of the 20th Guards Rifle Corps and from 3 October became part of the 21st Guards Rifle Corps. The division fought in the last part of the Battle of Kursk and the Chernigov-Poltava Offensive. From the area of Kotelva it advanced to the northwestern part of Poltava, establishing contact with the 5th Guards Army. On the night of 5 October, it crossed the Old Dnieper and crossed the Dnieper on the next night, capturing a bridgehead on the right bank near the village of Voronovka.

On 19 October, the division was transferred to the 7th Guards Army on the Steppe Front. It fought in defensive battles on the Inhulets River during early December. The 8th Guards Airborne took part in battles west of Kirovohrad until March 1944. In March 1944, the division was on the left wing of the 2nd Ukrainian Front during the Uman–Botoșani Offensive. It advanced towards Kompaniivka. At Semyonovka village, the division reached the left bank of the Southern Bug. On 22 March, the 22nd and 27th Guards Airborne Regiments, in conjunction with the 36th Guards Rifle Division's 108th Guards Rifle Regiment, crossed the Southern Bug near the village of Myhiya, seizing a bridgehead at Grushevka village in Pervomaisk Raion. Fighting the German 106th Infantry Division and 282nd Infantry Division, it reached the outskirts of Pervomaisk.

At this time, the 25th Guards Airborne Regiment crossed the Southern Bug in the area north of Semyonovka together with the 81st Guards Rifle Division capturing the villages of Romanova Balka, Ivanovka and Sokolovka. These units created a threat to the Germans holding Pervomaisk, which caused them to retreat. For its part in taking the city, the division was awarded the honorary title "Pervomaisk".

On 24 August, the division transferred to Kirzhach for resupply. On 27 December 1944, it was reorganized as the 107th Guards Rifle Division. On 8 July 1946, it became airborne again, joining the Soviet Airborne Troops, and was disbanded in 1959.

== Composition ==
- 22nd Guards Airborne Regiment
- 25th Guards Airborne Regiment
- 27th Guards Airborne Regiment
- 9th Guards Airborne Artillery Regiment

== Commanders ==
- Major General Alexander Kapitokhin (14 December 1942 – 14 June 1943)
- Major General Vladimir Stepin (14 June 1943 – 23 August 1943)
- Major General Mikhail Andreyevich Bogdanov (25 August 1943 – 26 June 1945)
