= 33rd Guards Rifle Division =

- Active: 1942–1946
- Country: Soviet Union
- Branch: Red Army
- Type: Division
- Role: Infantry
- Engagements: Case Blue; Battle of Stalingrad; Operation Winter Storm; Tormosin Offensive; Rostov Offensive Operation; Mius Front; Donbass Strategic Offensive (July 1943); Donbass Strategic Offensive (August 1943); Crimean Offensive; Vilnius-Kaunas Offensive; Šiauliai Offensive; Battle of Memel; East Prussian Offensive; Battle of Königsberg; Samland Offensive
- Decorations: Order of Suvorov
- Battle honours: Sevastopol

Commanders
- Notable commanders: Col. Fyodor Aleksandrovich Afanasev; Maj. Gen. Aleksandr Ivanovich Utvenko; Maj. Gen. Nikolai Ivanovich Seliverstov; Col. Nikolai Stepanovich Ugriumov; Maj. Gen. Pavel Mikhailovich Volosatykh; Maj. Gen. Konstantin Vladimirovich Vvedenskii; Col. Nikolai Ivanovich Krasnov; Col. Ivan Mironovich Novikov

The 33rd Guards Rifle Division was formed as an elite infantry division of the Red Army in May 1942, based on the 2nd formation of the 3rd Airborne Corps, and served in that role until after the end of the Great Patriotic War. It was the second of a series of ten Guards rifle divisions formed from airborne corps during the spring and summer of 1942. It was briefly assigned to the 47th Army in the North Caucasus Front but was soon moved to the Volga Military District and saw its first action as part of 62nd Army in the fighting on the approaches to Stalingrad. It was withdrawn east of the Volga in September, but returned to the front with the 2nd Guards Army in December, and it remained in this Army until early 1945. After helping to defeat Army Group Don's attempt to relieve the trapped 6th Army at Stalingrad the 33rd Guards joined in the pursuit across the southern Caucasus steppe until reaching the Mius River in early 1943. Through the rest of that year it fought through the southern sector of eastern Ukraine as part of Southern Front (later 4th Ukrainian Front) and in the spring of 1944 assisted in the liberation of the Crimea, earning a battle honor in the process. The Crimea was a strategic dead-end, so 2nd Guards Army was moved north to take part in the summer offensive through the Baltic states and to the border with Germany as part of 1st Baltic Front. During the offensive into East Prussia the division and its 13th Guards Rifle Corps was reassigned to 39th and the 43rd Armies before returning to 2nd Guards Army in April. For its part in the capture of the city-fortress of Königsberg the 33rd Guards would receive the Order of Suvorov. In mid-1946 it was converted to the 8th Separate Guards Rifle Brigade.

== Formation ==
The 3rd Airborne Corps had been formed for the second time in October 1941 in the North Caucasus Military District and had stayed there in reserve until it was converted to the 33rd Guards on May 30, 1942. Airborne corps were roughly divisional-sized units made up of three brigades of about 3,000 men each. Since they were considered elite light infantry the STAVKA decided they could be assigned Guards status upon reformation. The artillery regiment and many of the other subunits had to be formed from scratch. After the subunits received their designations the division's order of battle was as follows:

- 84th Guards Rifle Regiment (from 5th Airborne Brigade)
- 88th Guards Rifle Regiment (from 6th Airborne Brigade)
- 91st Guards Rifle Regiment (from 212th Airborne Brigade)
- 59th Guards Artillery Regiment
- 31st Guards Antitank Battalion
- 35th Guards Antiaircraft Battery (until April 25, 1943)
- 21st Guards Mortar Battalion (until October 20, 1942)
- 21st Guards Reconnaissance Company
- 40th Guards Sapper Battalion
- 45th Guards Signal Battalion
- 37th Guards Medical/Sanitation Battalion
- 32nd Guards Chemical Defense (Anti-gas) Company
- 42nd Guards Motor Transport Company
- 32nd Guards Field Bakery
- 22nd Guards Divisional Veterinary Hospital
- 1916th Field Postal Station
- 146th Field Office of the State Bank

Col. Fyodor Aleksandrovich Afanasev remained in command of the division after redesignation. Along with the 32nd Guards Rifle Division it was immediately assigned to 47th Army in North Caucasus Front, but by July 1 the 33rd had been moved to the 7th Reserve Army in the Reserve of the Supreme High Command. Later that month this would be redesignated as the 62nd Army.

== Battle of Stalingrad ==
By July 12 the situation facing the Soviet armies in the Caucasus region was becoming increasingly grim under the impact of the German Case Blue. Early that morning Stalin had the STAVKA issue a directive that renamed Southwestern Front as Stalingrad Front and added the 1st, 5th and 7th Reserve Armies and the 21st Army to its composition. 62nd Army was directed to occupy a line west of the Don River with 64th Army and other forces. 62nd Army was under command of Maj. Gen. V. Ya. Kolpakchi and had six rifle divisions under command, including the 33rd Guards.

German 6th Army was ordered to continue its eastward advance as soon as possible after July 17, but this was delayed by heavy rains; it was not until the 20th that LI Army Corps' lead divisions were able to engage and defeat the forward elements of 62nd Army on the Tsutskan River. By late on the next day five of the Army's divisions were deployed uniformly south to north across the Great Bend of the Don from Surovikino on the Chir River to Kletskaya on the Don. 33rd Guards was responsible for a sector 18 km wide roughly in the center of this line. On July 22 the XIV Panzer Corps and VIII Army Corps caught up and by the evening Kolpakchi reported that his divisions were engaging German tanks and infantry all along the line. The 3rd and 60th Motorized and 16th Panzer Divisions advanced rapidly the next day, tearing through 62nd Army's forward security belt and advancing 24–40 km, about halfway to the crossing points over the Don at Trekhostrovskaya and Kalach. By this time the 6th Army commander, Army Gen. F. Paulus, was planning to encircle 62nd Army west of the Don with his XIV Panzer and VIII Corps as a preliminary to an advance on Stalingrad.

During this fighting Guards Jr. Sgt. Pyotr Osipovich Boloto, an anti-tank rifleman of the 84th Guards Rifle Regiment, led three of his men with two PTRS rifles to a height between the 2nd and 3rd Battalions where a group of 30 German tanks were beginning to break through at the boundary. In the ensuing action the group knocked out 15 panzers, with Boloto himself accounting for eight, and the remainder withdrew. The news of this feat was soon broadcast and published around the USSR and a full-page photo of Boloto appeared on a motivational leaflet entitled "Learn to Fight With the Stalingraders!" On November 5 Boloto became the division's first Hero of the Soviet Union.

=== Fighting in the Don Bend ===
Paulus' two pincers made substantial advances on July 24. His two motorized divisions sliced through the 192nd Rifle Division on the Army's left wing and moved more than 50 km southeast to within 10 km of Kalach. 16th Panzer and the 113th Infantry Division penetrated the center of the line and forced Kolpakchi's forces back another 15 km towards the Don; 33rd Guards reported it was in battle with a group of 150 tanks. By the end of the day the division was loosely encircled on the high ground in the Maiorovskii region along with portions of the 192nd and 184th Rifle Divisions plus the 40th Tank Brigade and 644th Tank Battalion. At this critical moment XIV Panzer Corps had to slow its advance due to acute fuel shortages and stiff resistance north of Kalach. Col. K. A. Zhuravlyov, chief of 62nd Army's operations department, was flown in to take command of the encircled units. Kolpakchi began organizing counterattacks by most of the 13th Tank Corps to break through 16th Panzer while Zhuravlyov, who was out of communication with the rear, ordered his group to break out northward toward Kletskaya.

Over the next two days the two German pincers fought hard to complete their encirclement against sharply increasing Soviet attacks. VIII Corps' 113th and 100th Jäger Divisions, supported by most of 16th Panzer's tanks, had to simultaneously contain two Soviet bridgeheads south of the Don, defeat and destroy Group Zhuravlyov, and fend off attempts to relieve the pocket. The overall position of 6th Army became more difficult as the new 1st and 4th Tank Armies entered the fray. Zhuravlyov's force remained hard pressed and late on July 27 Kolpakchi reported:

"33rd GRD [guards rifle division], with a regiment of 181st RD and the Krasnodar [Infantry] School, continued to fight bitterly to restore the positions they lost in the Kalmykov region on the division's right wing. Fighting was going on for possession of Kalmykov (35 kilometres southwest of Kletskaya)."

By nightfall the tanks of 13th Tank Corps had driven a deep wedge through the forward defenses of 16th Panzer, despite being reduced to a strength of about 40 vehicles. At 1500 hours on July 28 the 13th Tanks linked up with 40th Tank Brigade and units of the 192nd and 184th Divisions. In desperation, Paulus ordered elements of VIII Corps to move southward both to block any attempt by Group Zhuravlyov to withdraw to the east and to relieve elements of 16th Panzer which were now encircled. A swirling and confused battle continued through the last days of the month. On July 29 Zhuravlyov ordered a breakout to the northeast to link up with 22nd Tank Corps which was reported to be advancing to the rescue. Burdened with 500 wounded and running out of fuel and ammunition, the Group followed the remnants of 13th Tanks in a two-day running battle, finally reaching 4th Tank Army's lines near Oskinskii and Verkhne-Golubaya late on July 31. The total force amounted to 5,000 men, 66 tanks and two artillery regiments. The next day the German forces reported destroying a similar number of tanks in the region and taking 2,000 prisoners. Colonel Zhuravlyov was seriously wounded in the escape, but survived. As of July 30 the 62nd Army reported that 33rd Guards had 5,613 men on its strength, which would suggest that only part of it had been in the pocket.

The balance of the division (primarily the 91st Guards Rifle Regiment) remained in 62nd Army's Don bridgehead west of Kalach. From August 1–6 the German 6th Army was forced to stand motionless due to further shortages of fuel. Attacking southward on August 7 from the Maiorovskii region, 30 km northwest of Kalach, multiple battlegroups of 16th Panzer smashed through the defenses of 33rd Guards and 131st Rifle Divisions and reached the northern outskirts of the town by nightfall. The remaining units in the bridgehead fared no better from the tank and infantry onslaught and shortly after dark the 24th Panzer Division linked up with the 16th to complete its encirclement. 33rd Guards took over a defensive sector from units of the 181st Division along a line from Hill 189.9 to Hill 191.2 to Berezovyi. The next day the two panzer divisions began pressing the eastern face of the pocket back towards the west while divisions of the LI, XI Army and XXIV Panzer Corps drove in other sectors of the perimeter. A summary from the headquarters of 62nd Army noted that the current location of the division was unknown. On August 9 the 33rd Guards and 181st were located in the Plesistovskii-Dobrinka region and had been ordered to fight their way to Kalach. By 0400 hours the next morning they had reached to within 22–25 km northwest of this objective, but on August 11 the Army stated it had lost communications with four encircled divisions including 33rd Guards. 6th Army announced the completion of the battle the following day, along with the elimination of eight rifle divisions; Soviet documents indicate that roughly half of the encircled troops managed to escape east across the Don but as of August 20 this included just 48 men of the 91st Guards Regiment.

=== Defense of the City ===
On August 15 Colonel Afanasyev was appointed to command of the 2nd formation of the 5th Airborne Corps and was replaced by Col. Aleksandr Ivanovich Utvenko. This officer would be promoted to the rank of major general on October 14. In mid-August the division was brought back together in the reserves of the newly created Southeastern Front for a much-needed refitting. When 6th Army began its dash for the Volga on August 21 the division was thrown in to help man defenses south of the corridor east of the Rossoshka River. By August 24 it was defending the sector from Novo-Alekseevskii west to Dmitrievka with the 196th Rifle Division and four battalions of the 115th Fortified Region. At dawn on August 26 the LI Corps began a general assault against 62nd Army which drove back the 196th towards the Rossoshka, and in the last days of the month the remainder of the Army withdrew to that line as well.

By September 3 only 62nd Army and about half of 64th Army were defending the approaches to the city proper. On the same date the division was ordered as follows:

33rd Guards Rifle Division... with 52nd Separate Machine Gun-Artillery Battalion, 115th Fortified Region (three batteries) and 651st Tank Destroyer Regiment. Firmly defend the Ezhovka, Krutenki suburb, and Hill 153.2 (incl.) line to destroy the enemy in front of the forward edge, deny the enemy the Minina suburb, and prepare a counterattack toward Peschanka.

While this looked good on paper the division, along with the 196th and the 20th Motorized Rifle Brigade, were only shells of their former selves, with regiments numbered in the hundreds of men and battalions in the tens. The best the Army could do to help was to allocate the 38th Motorized Rifle Brigade as backup. The 6th and 4th Panzer Armies went over to the offensive that day and continued to advance on Stalingrad on September 4, forcing the remnants of the two Soviet divisions back southeastward toward Opytnaia Station and the wooded northern slopes of the Tsaritsa River valley. There they reinforced the defenses of the 42nd Rifle Brigade. During the next day the 33rd Guards was part of a force consisting of the 35th Guards and 131st Rifle Divisions that was holding its own against 24th Panzer. This tough defensive fighting came at a cost, and as of September 11 the division had been reduced to just 864 men, which was not the worst case in 62nd Army. The next day it was pulled from the front line for refitting, but before the end of the month it was withdrawn east of the Volga where it was assigned to the 1st Reserve Army in the Reserve of the Supreme High Command.

On October 22 the STAVKA reestablished Southwestern Front and the next day formed the new 1st Guards Army from 4th Reserve Army and 2nd Guards Army from 1st Reserve Army. The Army formed up in the Tambov region and was to be combat ready by November 25. 33rd Guards was assigned to 1st Guards Rifle Corps with the 24th Guards and 98th Rifle Divisions. The division would remain in this Corps until early 1944. 2nd Guards was earmarked for assignment to either Western Front or Don Front, but circumstances would decree otherwise.

=== Operation Winter Storm ===
Operation Uranus, the Soviet offensive to encircle the German forces at Stalingrad, began on November 19, and the encirclement was completed on November 23. In response the German High Command formed Army Group Don with the goal of relieving the trapped armies. Operation Winter Storm was launched on December 12 from the area of Kotelnikovo and made large gains on the first day. Alarmed by this development, the STAVKA ordered the 2nd Guards Army to force-march to the region southwest of Stalingrad to counter this offensive. By now the 33rd Guards had been substantially rebuilt with a young cadre; 95 percent of its personnel were Russians or Ukrainians from the year groups 1922–1928. On November 29 Lt. Gen. R. Ya. Malinovskii had been appointed to command the Army; 2nd Guards was a large army by Soviet standards with more than 122,000 men, 2,325 guns and 469 tanks. Moving all of this took time and the bulk of these forces didn't arrive at the front until December 18 although 1st Guards Corps had disembarked some distance to the north five days earlier. The Army proceeded to take up defensive positions behind the Myshkova River, although by this time the German counteroffensive had largely been fought to a standstill. The strategic position had also been altered when Southwestern and Voronezh Fronts launched Operation Little Saturn on December 16 which soon had Army Group Don and the other Axis forces in the Caucasus region scrambling to save themselves.

=== Tormosin Offensive ===
Planning for an operation to push back Army Group Don began even before 2nd Guards had fully reached the front. By December 24 the Army Group commander, Field Marshal E. von Manstein, had transferred the 6th Panzer Division west of the Don, leaving his LVII Panzer Corps with little to oppose a Soviet advance on Kotelnikovo. In order to fill the gap between the Little Saturn and Kotelnikovo drives, the STAVKA issued orders to 5th Shock and 5th Tank Army to begin an offensive westward across the Don and Chir rivers in the direction of Tormosin; this was reinforced by roughly half of the forces of 2nd Guards, which would join in 5th Shock's attack on December 29. The immediate objective was to encircle and destroy Corps Mieth, consisting of the 336th and 384th Infantry Divisions and assorted smaller commands under command of Army Gen. F. Mieth as part of 4th Panzer Army. The main forces of 2nd Guards Army had already thrust south across the Askay River with its right flank, including 1st Guards Corps, beginning to march across the Don. On the first day of the offensive the 33rd Guards forced a crossing just north of Verkhne-Kurmoiarskii, assisted by light tanks of the 2nd Guards Mechanized Corps. These formed the leading units of an operational group led by Maj. Gen. Ya. G. Kreizer, the Army's deputy commander, which also had the 4th Cavalry Corps and the 300th and 387th Rifle Divisions under command. During the afternoon the division advanced on Chapurin and Aginov. Over that night the 2nd Guards Army was transferred to the new Southern Front; the 33rd Guards would remain in this Front (renamed 4th Ukrainian on October 20, 1943) until May 1944.

Late in the evening of December 31 the 2nd Guards Mechanized liberated Tormosin although due to a communications error this news did not appear in the STAVKA summary until January 2, 1943:

Southern Front. 2nd Guards Army. The forces of 2nd Gds. MC and 33rd Gds. RD, after smashing enemy resistance, captured Popov, Beliaevskii, Zakharov, Tormosin, Morskoi, Pronin, Nizhnyi Kurman, and Kulaly (44 kilometers south of Tormosin) by day's end on 31 December.

By now the German Group Bassenge was retreating westward to the Tsimla River to link up with 11th Panzer Division while the 384th and the right wing of 336th Infantry were also withdrawing in the same direction. These moves brought the Tormosin offensive to an end.

== Drive on Rostov ==
The next objective for Group Kreizer was the town of Nizhne-Gurov on the way to the Tsimla. From here the 33rd Guards would join up to help take Tsimlyanskaia and Konstantinovskii, while also seeking to isolate and destroy elements of Corps Mieth as they fell back. One such opportunity came on January 5 when the division attempted to smash the defenses of Group Basson along the Belaya River. The German group fell back just as the 11th Panzer was moving east to take up positions along the Kagalnik River. The 33rd Guards was tasked with the capture of Kargalsko-Belianskii Farm. Overnight the 84th Guards Regiment, supported by two artillery battalions, penetrated into the farm but was met with a counterattack led by 15 tanks and was pushed back. Subunits of the 91st Guards Regiment arrived to assist and the fight lasted through the next day, during which the two regiments repelled 10 counterattacks by 1-2 infantry battalions backed by as many as 30 tanks, and claimed 12 of the latter destroyed by artillery. By the end of the day the farm was still in Soviet hands. Meanwhile, the rest of the division, along with the 387th and 24th Guards Rifle Divisions engaged in fierce fighting with 11th Panzer and 336th Infantry for the populated points of Suvorov, Kargalsko-Belianski and Mariinski in front of the Kagalnik. By day's end on the 7th these points were taken, but an immediate attempt to force the river was unsuccessful. At this point Group Kreizer was disbanded.

At this time a powerful German reinforcement, in the form of the fresh and nearly-complete 7th Panzer Division, was beginning to arrive by rail at Rostov and Shakhty, the latter of which was the immediate objective of 1st Guards Corps. According to the operational summary of 1st Guards Corps for January 9 the 33rd Guards "captured Ermilov, Kalinin, and the northeastern outskirts of Savalev and is fighting on the northern outskirts of Galpin." A further report from 2nd Guards Army indicated that on the same date the Corps faced a heavy German counterattack from "up to 100 tanks, 30 APCs, and up to three regiments of infantry." 11th Panzer had struck 24th Guards with roughly 35 tanks and its panzer reconnaissance battalion, "bowling it over" and advancing about 10 km, capturing Kostyrochnyi and reaching Bogoiavlinskaia before being halted by the 387th Division at 1900 hours. The 33rd, meanwhile, managed to advance to a line 2 km west of Ermilov and Galpin. Overnight the 7th Panzer concentrated to the immediate rear while the weaker 11th and 22nd Panzer Divisions were subordinated to its command. On January 10 the combined force struck three divisions of 5th Shock Army in a bridgehead west of the Kagalnik and forced them to withdraw with serious losses. Having fulfilled its mission the 7th Panzer withdrew to the north at dawn on January 12. This counterstrike forced Southern Front to abandon its plan to advance on Rostov from the north. Nevertheless, Corps Mieth pulled back west to the Northern Donets during January 15–17.

1st Guards Corps began its pursuit on January 16 and during the day the 33rd Guards took Lisichkin with forward detachments operating toward Nagolnaia Balka, Nizhnyi Zhukovskii and Talovskii. On the 19th the division seized a bridgehead 5 km wide and 7 km deep over the Donets; at 1000 hours the 84th Guards Regiment was attacked by a company of infantry and five tanks which forced it to withdraw to the southern outskirts of Nizhne Kudriuchenskaia. By the end of the day the division was still fighting there and south and southeast of Khriashchevskii. On January 21 it remained in much the same positions largely owing to the fact they were dominated from high ground held by elements of the German 336th Infantry. At this point the advance stalled and on January 22–23 the division regrouped its forces. By this time it was clear that the decision to operate 2nd Guards Army on both sides of the Don had been a mistake and since German forces had a strong line along the Donets, the best route to Rostov was south of the Don. On January 25–26 the 33rd Guards and 387th moved south of the river; due to Soviet supply difficulties both divisions had to leave part of their artillery behind because of the absence of fuel.

By 0700 hours on January 27 the division had finished concentrating in Susatskaia, Karpovka and Kalinin, 20–25 km north of the Manych River. The next day it attacked towards Manychskaia and Samodurovka without success due to strong enemy resistance from up to two German infantry battalions and 20-25 tanks of the 16th Motorized Division. Despite this failure it continued its attacks for these villages through the next three days. In a report late on February 1 the 2nd Guards Army confirmed the general stalemate existing on its front. It also reported that the 33rd Guards had a total strength of 4,811 personnel, of which 1,895 were "bayonets" (riflemen and sappers). From January 15 to 31 the division lost 1,016 men killed and 2,245 wounded. A further report for February 2 stated:

33rd Gds. RD fought its way forward, with 84th Gds. RR fighting intense street battles with the enemy in the center of Manychskaia, 91st Gds. RR fighting to clear the northeastern outskirts of Manychskaia, and 88th Gds. RR fighting in the vicinity of Lake Kuzminka to protect 91st and 84th Gds. RRs' main forces.

The village was finally cleared by 1100 hours the next day. The 84th and 91st went on to attack Arpachin along with the 387th Division while the 88th took Samodurovka with the help of the 5th Guards Mechanized Corps. On February 4 the 2nd Guards and 51st Armies began an intense drive to overcome 16th Motorized and during the day the division liberated Arpachin and advanced towards Alitub, which was taken on February 5. Between February 6–8 the last German forces south of the Don, 111th Infantry and 16th Motorized, withdrew, blowing the bridges behind them, although one bridge at Rostov was only half destroyed. Although Rostov would not be liberated until February 14, it was understood by both sides that the next German defense line would be along the Mius River, as it had been after the first liberation of the city in 1941. Given the heavy casualties to date on both sides, what followed would be a race to the Mius by "cripples."

=== Race to the Mius ===
On February 15 the 2nd Guards Army's advance was led by the roughly 20 operable tanks of 3rd Guards Mechanized Corps and two truck-mounted rifle battalions which liberated Generalskoe near noon and reached Petrovskoe, a total advance of about 32 km. The foot-bound 387th and 33rd Guards lagged 15 – 20 km behind. By the next afternoon the division was fighting 300m east of Ovchinnikov, 35 km east-southeast of Matveev Kurgan. On February 17 Southern Front was closing on the Mius River which it hoped to cross from the march. After a long march overnight led by 4th Guards Mechanized Corps across the Mius, the 88th and 91st Guards Regiments created a bridgehead, attacked the village of Kruglik and drove out the headquarters of the 126th Panzergrenadier Regiment 23rd Panzer Division. A further assault captured a group of houses from the 2nd Battalion of the same regiment. The 88th Guards, led by Lt. Col. Dmitrii Vasilyevich Kazak, was soon surrounded and subjected to up to 24 counterattacks from elements of 23rd Panzer, including attached Tiger tanks. Meanwhile, the 91st Guards Regiment, under command of Maj. Aleksandr Dmitrievich Yepanchin, temporarily relieved the encircled 4th Guards Mechanized before falling back to Hill 105.7 in the face of heavy air attacks and held this position while inflicting casualties and damage on the counterattacking German forces. At 0300 hours on February 19 Kazak and Yepanshin abandoned the village of Zevin and withdrew their regiments southward before counterattacking and retaking Zevin. At 1600 German artillery fire destroyed the regiments' radio communications and after a final stand on Hill 105.8 for several hours the remnants infiltrated to safety in the rear. In recognition of their leadership the two officers were made Heroes of the Soviet Union on April 17. Yepanchin became the division's deputy commander some months later and survived the war but Kazak was mortally wounded in combat near Donetsk on September 19.

Despite the setbacks of these initial attacks, "driven by necessity, optimism, vengeance, or sheer stubbornness, the Southern Front's bloody attacks along the river would persist through and past the end of the month." 84th Guards Regiment had lost the village of Stepanovskii to a counterattack by 16th Motorized, which was a factor in the isolation of the other two regiments. 24th Guards Division, which had been ordered to reinforce the bridgehead, advanced too slowly to do so. 4th Guards Mechanized was gradually being destroyed in encirclement. Orders from Southern Front to reestablish the division's foothold across the Mius on February 20 and after were highly unrealistic. That afternoon the 84th Guards was hit by three further counterattacks by tanks and infantry. Two days later the battered division was pulled back to Corps reserve at Matveev Kurgan. It remained in reserve for the rest of the month. In a strength return dated February 25 the division's total personnel is given as 2,185, of which active fighters were 1,581 (84th Regiment: 308; 88th Regiment: 774; 91st Regiment: 499) Furthermore, there were only nine artillery pieces and 35 mortars of all calibres on hand.

== Into Ukraine and Crimea ==
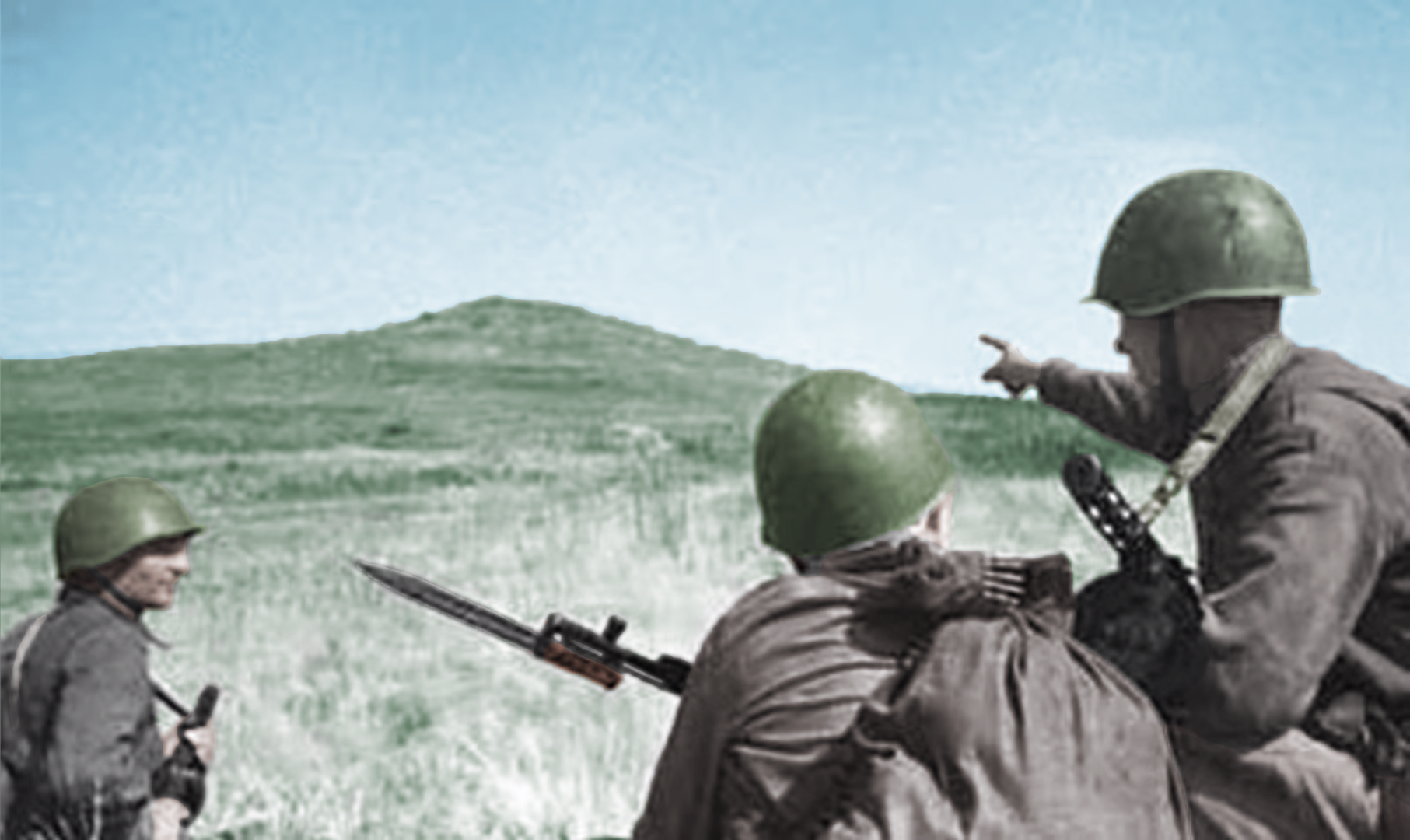
Soviet soldiers near Saur-Mogila

The 33rd Guards spent the spring of the year rebuilding along the Mius front. On April 17 General Utvenko was assigned to command of the 31st Guards Rifle Corps and was replaced three days later by Maj. Gen. Nikolai Ivanovich Seliverstov. On July 17 the Southern and Southwestern Fronts began a new offensive against the German positions on the Mius but the initial gains were soon lost to counterattacks. The defenses here had been well-organized and strengthened off-and-on since December 1941 and were very difficult to break. On July 30, as the offensive was winding down, General Seliverstov's observation point near Hill 277.9 (called Saur-Mogila) was discovered by German artillery observers and heavily shelled. Seliverstov was mortally wounded in the attack and died during air evacuation to a hospital. He was briefly replaced in command by Lt. Col. Mitrofan Afanasevich Kuzenkov on August 2, then by Col. Dmitrii Vasilevich Makarov on the 14th. At about this time 30 percent of the division's personnel were noted as being of Bashkir nationality.

On August 16 Southern Front again attacked the rebuilt German 6th Army along the Mius and finally broke through. Over the next month the 2nd Guards Army drove west through the southeastern Ukraine. On September 17 Col. Nikolai Stepanovich Ugriumov took command of the division from Colonel Makarov; Ugriumov had been made a Hero of the Soviet Union in 1939 for his exploits on the first day of the Winter War with Finland. On October 30 elements of the renamed 4th Ukrainian Front reached the entrance to the Perekop Isthmus and the Axis 17th Army was soon isolated by land in the Crimea. Over the following months the two sides sparred for the several crossing points and the 56th Army created a bridgehead in the Kerch area. At the start of April 1944 the 2nd Guards Army was given command of all the forces in the Perekop sector in preparation for the final assault into the peninsula.

The offensive began at 0800 hours on April 8 with a two-and-a-half hour artillery preparation by 2nd Guards and by 51st Army from its bridgehead across the Syvash. The 2nd Guards commander, Army Gen. G. F. Zakharov made the assault using relatively novel tactics. He led with just his 13th Guards Corps, with artillery-delivered smoke rounds, flame-throwing tanks and heavy self-propelled guns in support. Despite losses the attack tore a large hole in the German line, and 1st Guards Corps was fed into the breach. By 1600 hours the next day the German line finally broke. After an outflanking landing by elements of the 387th Rifle Division the German Gruppe Konrad began a costly retreat to its second line at Ishun, which was already untenable and soon fell, giving the Soviet forces complete access to the Crimea. On April 14, as the 33rd Guards took part in the pursuit of the Axis forces towards Sevastopol, Colonel Ugriumov was wounded and had to be hospitalised; two days later Col. Pavel Mikhailovich Volosatykh was moved from command of the 263rd Rifle Division of 51st Army to take over command. This officer would be made a Hero of the Soviet Union on May 16 and was promoted to the rank of major general the following day. Another soldier of the division, Sr. Sgt. Gabdelahat Gabdelganeevich Valiev, a squad leader of the 1st Company of the 91st Guards Regiment, would be posthumously made a Hero of the Soviet Union on the same day for his gallantry in the fighting near Belbek River.

=== Battle for Sevastopol ===
On the morning of April 15 the 19th Tank Corps began probing the defenses of Sevastopol, which were initially being held by just seven Romanian mountain infantry battalions. Overall the fortress-city was much weaker than it had been in 1942, although the Front commander, Army Gen. F. I. Tolbukhin, believed them to be stronger than they were and opted for a deliberate attack. At about this time the division was reassigned to the 55th Rifle Corps. 2nd Guards Army made its first assault on April 23 and seized ground on Mekenzievy Mountain before 19th Tanks was stopped by minefields. By now five German divisions had been incorporated into the defense, but they had all been reduced to about 30 percent of their authorized strength. On May 1 the Army launched a major attack against the south side of the Belbek River. On May 5 Tolbukhin began his final offensive at 0930 hours with a two-hour artillery barrage. Two days later another massive artillery preparation blasted the top of Mount Sapun, followed by an assault by three rifle corps, including the 11th Guards, to which the division was now assigned; this encountered very strong machine gun and mortar fire from still-intact German positions. Despite this the Corps reached the edge of Severnaya Bay. Overnight a series of German counterattacks against Mount Sapun failed and late on May 8 Hitler grudgingly authorized the evacuation of 17th Army. The Sevastopol area was completely cleared by May 13, but the division had already been honored for its part in the victory:

"SEVASTOPOL... 33rd Guards Rifle Division (Colonel Volosatykh, Pavel Mikhailovich)... The troops who participated in the liberation of Sevastopol, by the order of the Supreme High Command of May 10, 1944, and a commendation in Moscow, are given a salute of 24 artillery salvoes from 324 guns."

It was the only rifle division to receive the Sevastopol honorific. By now planning for the Soviet summer offensives was well underway and since the Crimea was a strategic dead end the forces of 4th Ukrainian Front were available for employment elsewhere. The latest intelligence indicated the German forces in Belorussia, the target of the first offensive, were stronger than previously thought so 2nd Guards Army was alerted for a move to Yartsevo.

== Baltic Campaigns ==
As of July 1 the division was in the Reserve of the Supreme High Command, in 11th Guards Corps with the 2nd and 32nd Guards Rifle Divisions. 2nd Guards Army was soon assigned to 1st Baltic Front, which was pushing into the gap between Army Groups North and Center created by the ongoing collapse of the latter under the impact of Operation Bagration. By July 5 it had advanced as far as Hlybokaye. As of the beginning of August it had pushed westward as far as the outskirts of Šiauliai in Lithuania. On August 16 the division was about 15 km northwest of that city when Operation Doppelkopf began but it saw little action. On August 29 General Volosatykh was moved to the Front headquarters before being reassigned as deputy commander of 40th Rifle Corps; he was replaced by Maj. Gen. Konstantin Vladimirovich Vvedenskii. By the first week of October the division was on the Dubysa River southeast of Raseiniai, preparing to join the attack through to the Baltic Sea.

== East Prussian Campaign ==
During October and November the 2nd Guards Army played a relatively minor role in the Memel Offensive Operation. On November 29 the STAVKA sent the following order to the commanders of 1st Baltic and 3rd Belorussian Fronts:

The 2nd Guards Army, consisting of the 13th Guards Rifle Corps... 11th Guards Rifle Corps (2nd, 32nd and 33rd guards rifle divisions) and the 22nd Guards Rifle Corps... along with army reinforcements, service establishments and rear services, is to move to concentrate in the Jurburgas area, where it is to be included in the Third Belorussian Front. The army's movement is to begin... on 3 December of this year, and its arrival in the Jurburgas area is to be completed by the morning of 13 December...

General Vvedenskii was hospitalized on December 8; while he was recovering he handed over his command to Col. Nikolai Ivanovich Krasnov on January 4, 1945.

The Front's plan for the offensive, which began on January 14 on this sector, called for the 39th, 5th and 28th Armies to attack from the first echelon along a line from Tilsit to Insterburg with 11th Guards Army in second echelon. Taking advantage of 28th Army's breakthrough towards Insterburg the 2nd Guards attacked on at 1430 hours on January 16 with three divisions of its 11th and 13th Guards Corps following a one-and-a-half hour artillery preparation; 33rd Guards was in 11th Guards Corps' second echelon. The German forces put up heavy resistance and the lead divisions had to beat off 12 infantry and tank counterattacks before capturing the first trench line and parts of the second and pausing to consolidate. The next day the advance remained slow, but the Front committed its armored formations on January 18 and secured a breakthrough north of Gumbinnen. In the following days 2nd Guards Army advanced in the direction of Angerapp in support of 28th Army.

As the drive into East Prussia continued the division was transferred to the 13th Guards Corps, which was now in 39th Army. It would remain in this Corps for the duration of the war. On January 31 the Corps reached the Frisches Haff from the north along a 10 km front, cutting off the German forces in and around Königsberg from contact to the west, but heavy counterattacks soon re-opened a corridor. In February the 13th Guards Corps was reassigned to 43rd Army, which was now part of the Zemland Group of Forces. At the beginning of April the Front made preparations for the final assault on Königsberg. The heavily reinforced Army deployed six divisions in the first echelon along a 5 km-wide front from Trenk to Amalienhof with the task of breaking through the external perimeter, advancing to the southeast, and clear the city as far as the Pregel River along with units of the 50th Army. The attack, which faced two regiments of the 561st Infantry Division, began on April 6 and proceeded largely as planned. On April 8 the Army committed its second echelon into the fighting and the next day the garrison surrendered.

After the fall of Königsberg the 43rd Army was redeployed to the west to take part in the Samland Offensive. It was assigned to a front 7–8 km wide on the south flank on the north shore of the Frisches Haff as a support for the three armies (5th, 39th, and 11th Guards) operating in the center. The attack began at 0800 hours on April 13 following an hour-long artillery preparation and on the first day the Army advanced 5 km and captured 1,500 prisoners. It continued its advance on April 14, capturing a major strongpoint at Gross Heidekrug. The German forces, squeezed into an increasingly restricted space, put up stubborn resistance the next two days but on April 17 the 43rd assisted the 39th Army in capturing the town of Fischausen in a night attack. The Samland had by now been cleared apart from the Vistula Spit and the town of Pillau, which fell to the 11th Guards Army on April 25. At about this time the 33rd Guards, still in 13th Guards Corps, returned to 2nd Guards Army where it remained for the duration.

== Postwar ==
On April 19 the division came under the command of Col. Ivan Mironovich Novikov. Novikov had been made a Hero of the Soviet Union in October 1943 for his leadership of the 1031st Rifle Regiment of the 280th Rifle Division in the crossing of the Dniepr River in September of that year. He would remain in command until July 1946. On May 17 the 33rd Guards was decorated with the Order of Suvorov, 2nd Degree, for its part in battle for Königsberg. While Colonel Novikov was still in command the division was reorganized as the 8th Separate Guards Rifle Brigade. This unit was disbanded in March 1947.
