= Bagayevsky =

Bagayevsky (masculine), Bagayevskaya (feminine), or Bagayevskoye (neuter) may refer to:

- Bagayevsky District, a district of Rostov Oblast, Russia
- Bagayevskaya, a rural locality (a stanitsa) in Rostov Oblast, Russia
