= Vasily Larin =

Vasily Mikhailovich Larin
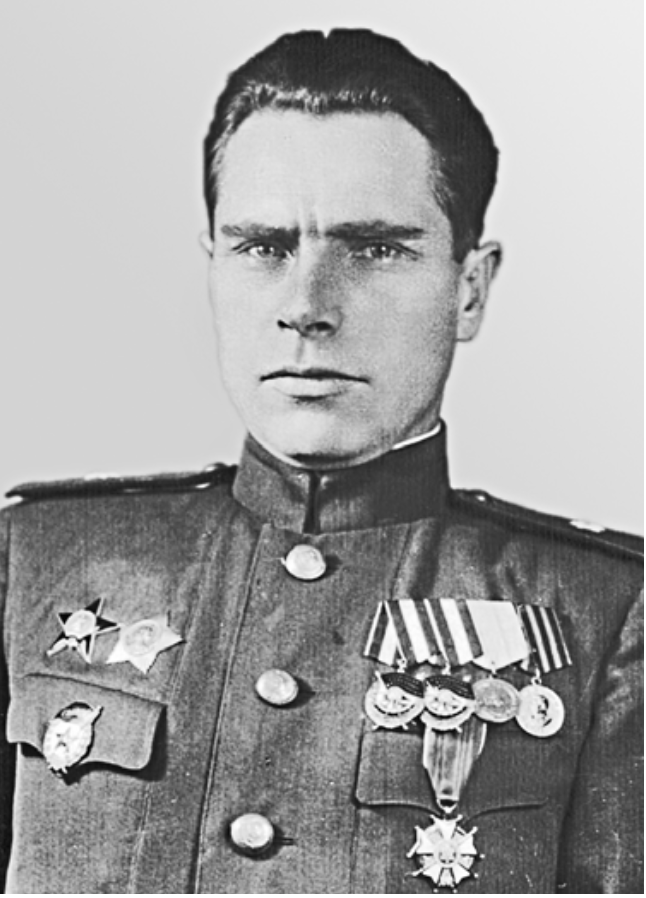
- Larin, c. 1945
- Born: 20 June 1908; Bolharka, Kherson Governorate, Russian Empire
- Died: 9 March 1957 (aged 48) Leningrad, Soviet Union
- Allegiance: Soviet Union
- Branch: Red Army; Soviet Airborne Forces
- Service years: 1928–1957
- Rank: General-mayor
- Commands: 128th Separate Rifle Brigade; 199th Rifle Division; 98th Guards Airborne Division; 11th Guards Airborne Division; 8th Guards Rifle Division
- Conflicts: World War II
- Awards: Order of Lenin

Vasily Mikhailovich Larin (Russian: Василий Михайлович Ларин; 20 June 1908 – 9 March 1957) was a Soviet Army general-mayor who held divisional command during World War II.

== Early life and prewar service ==
A Russian, Vasily Mikhailovich Larin was born on 20 June 1908 in the village of Bolharka, Kherson Governorate. Choosing a military career, he entered the Odessa Infantry School as a cadet on 19 September 1928. After graduation from the school in 1931, he was appointed a platoon commander in the 12th Rifle Regiment of the 4th Rifle Division of the Belorussian Military District. In December of that year he transferred to command a training platoon in the division's 10th Rifle Regiment. Larin was transferred to the United Belarusian Military School in March 1934, serving as commander of a platoon and company of cadets there.

In September 1938, Larin was transferred to the Oryol Military District, where he served as a battalion commander in the 163rd Rifle Regiment of the 55th Rifle Division. In September 1939 the battalion was expanded into the 607th Rifle Regiment of the new 185th Rifle Division. Larin commanded the regiment until December, when he was summoned to the Frunze Military Academy to complete its correspondence and night school department. After graduation from the academy in May 1940, he returned from the regiment as its assistant commander for combat units. In August he was appointed assistant chief of the Operations Department of the staff of the 11th Rifle Corps, stationed in the Baltic Special Military District.

== World War II ==
After Germany invaded the Soviet Union, Larin took part in the border battle in Latvia, during which the corps fought as part of the 8th Army of the Northwestern Front. Between 23 and 25 June its units took part in the front's counterattack against the advancing 4th Panzer Group in the Šiauliai region. Subsequently, the corps conducted a fighting retreat towards Riga and thence towards Tartu. In July the corps, as part of the Northern Front, took part in defensive battles in Estonia on the line of Pärnu and Tartu. From 22 to 25 July German troops managed to break through the Soviet defenses and reach Lake Chudskoye, surrounding the corps. By 30 July its units managed to break through to Soviet lines and then fought defensive battles on the line from Lake Chudskoye to the Gulf of Finland, holding back the German advance along the Narva highway.

In October, Larin, then a major, was appointed chief of staff of the 85th Rifle Division. Its units fought on the line of the Voronka river and Petergof in the Oranienbaum bridgehead. In November the division was transported by sea near Leningrad to the Ust-Tosno sector, where it took part in defensive fighting under the 55th Army until the end of the year.

In late December Larin departed for the Ural Military District to take command of the new 128th Separate Rifle Brigade, which he formed in the region of Tyoplaya Gora. Larin's brigade arrived on the Western Front in May 1942. Initially part of the 7th Guards Rifle Corps of the 33rd Army, it was transferred to the 8th Guards Rifle Corps of the 16th Army in February 1943. Larin led the brigade in defensive battles in the region of Vyazma and Zhizdra. In May 1943 the brigade was shifted to the 68th Army and withdrawn to the Reserve of the Supreme High Command in the region of Pogoreloye Gorodishche, Kalinin Oblast, where it was merged with the 126th Separate Rifle Brigade to form the 199th Rifle Division under Larin's command. After the end of the division's formation period on 6 July Larin was sent to the Voroshilov Higher Military Academy for an accelerated training course.

After graduating from the course, Larin was appointed deputy commander of the 37th Guards Rifle Corps, forming in Moscow, on 21 January 1944. In June the corps was assigned to the 7th Army of the Karelian Front and took part in the Svir–Petrozavodsk Offensive, in which it retook Olonets. On 9 August the corps was withdrawn to the Reserve of the Supreme High Command and relocated to the region of Mogilev, where it was reorganized into the 37th Guards Airborne Corps.

On 10 November 1944, Larin, then a colonel, was appointed commander of the corps’ 98th Guards Airborne Division. Between 30 December and 5 January 1945 the division and corps were again reorganized into rifle units and assigned to the 9th Guards Army. From 12 January to 17 February the division was relocated to Hungary, concentrating in the Nagykáta region 56 kilometers east of Budapest. On 20 March, its units, as part of the 2nd Ukrainian Front, went on the offensive, later taking part in the Vienna Offensive. During the offensive, the division took Veszprém, Szombathely, and Sárvár. Larin was promoted to the rank of general-mayor on 19 April. For exemplary fulfillment of assigned objectives in the battles to take Pápa, Devecser, the division received the Order of the Red Banner on 26 April. In the final stage of the war the division fought in the Prague Offensive. On 10 May it linked up with American troops in the region of Strakonice.

== Postwar ==
Postwar, Larin continued to command the division in the Southern Group of Forces. In January 1946 it was relocated to Murom, where in June it was reorganized back into the 98th Guards Airborne Division. In July the division was relocated to the Primorsky Military District together with the 37th Guards Airborne Corps, and in November Larin sent to receive further military education at the Voroshilov Higher Military Academy. Graduating from the academy's special department on 22 December 1948, Larin was appointed commander of the 38th Guards Airborne Corps' 11th Guards Airborne Division in February 1949. In January 1953 he was transferred to command the 8th Guards Rifle Division, and in November 1955 became chief of the Combined District Officer Improvement Course of the Leningrad Military District. Larin was retired on 8 January 1957 and died in Leningrad on 9 March.

== Awards ==
Larin was a recipient of the following decorations:

- Order of Lenin
- Order of the Red Banner (3)
- Order of Suvorov, 2nd class
- Order of the Red Star
- Legionnaire of the Legion of Merit
