= Vladimir Selivyorstov =

Russian military officer (born 1973)

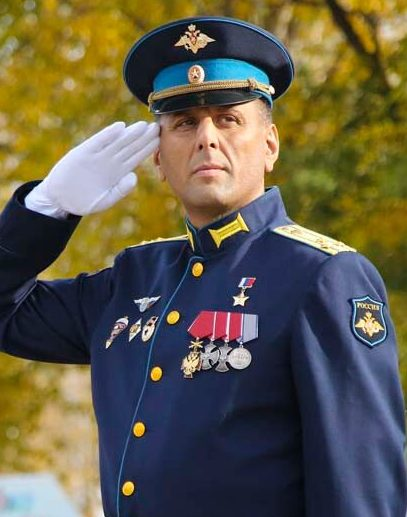
- Selivyorstov in 2020
- Born: 1 August 1973 (age 53); Stanki, Vladimir Oblast, Russian SFSR, Soviet Union
- Education: Ryazan Guards Higher Airborne Command School; Combined Arms Academy of the Armed Forces of the Russian Federation
- Spouse: Svetlana Selivyorstova
- Children: 3
- Military career
- Allegiance: Russia
- Branch: Russian Airborne Forces
- Service years: 1992–present
- Rank: Major General
- Commands: Africa Corps in Mali; 106th Guards Airborne Division; 31st Guards Air Assault Brigade; 331st Guards Airborne Regiment
- Conflicts: Second Chechen War; Russo-Georgian War; Russo-Ukrainian war; 2014 Russian annexation of Crimea; 2022 Russian invasion of Ukraine; 2023 Ukrainian counteroffensive; Mali War; Russian intervention in Mali war; 2026 Mali attacks

Major General Vladimir Vyacheslavovich Selivyorstov (Note: Russian: Владимир Вячеславович Селивёрстов) (born 1 August 1973) is a Russian Airborne Forces officer who is reportedly the commander of the Africa Corps in Mali as of early 2026. He previously served as commander of the 106th Guards Airborne Division between 2021 and 2023, during which time he was deployed for the Russo-Ukrainian war. He also deployed in the Second Chechen War, the Russo-Georgian War, and the 2014 Russian annexation of Crimea. Selivyorstov received the award Hero of the Russian Federation in 2014 for his role in Crimea.

== Early life and education ==
Vladimir Vyacheslavovich Selivyorstov was born on 1 August 1973 in the village Stanki, in Vyaznikovsky District, Vladimir Oblast of the Russian SFSR, Soviet Union. His grandfather was killed fighting on the Eastern Front of World War II near Smolensk. He completed his secondary education in 1990 and graduated from an agricultural college in Suzdal in 1992. That same year he entered the Russian Armed Forces, doing his national service as a conscript until 1993. He was stationed in the Moscow Oblast and took part in the Victory Day parade. In 1993 he entered the Ryazan Guards Higher Airborne Command School, graduating in 1997.

== Military career ==
After his graduation in 1997, he was stationed in the Moscow area. Selivyorstov was deployed as a member of the Russian military contingent in the Kosovo Force from 1999 to 2000, and later took part in the Second Chechen War and the Russo-Georgian War. He graduated from the Combined Arms Academy of the Armed Forces of the Russian Federation in 2010. Selivyorstov was eventually the deputy commander of the 45th Guards Spetsnaz Brigade, and for his role in the 2014 Russian annexation of Crimea, on 25 December 2014 he was awarded the title-medal Hero of the Russian Federation.

From 2018 to 2019, he commanded the 331st Guards Airborne Regiment in the 98th Guards Airborne Division. From 2019 to 2020, he was the deputy commander of the 106th Guards Airborne Division, before commanding the 31st Guards Air Assault Brigade until July 2021. That month, Colonel Selivyorstov was appointed the commander of the 106th Guards Airborne Division, and assumed command on 20 August 2021.

On 15 July 2023, during the 2023 Ukrainian counteroffensive of the Russian invasion of Ukraine, Major General Selivyorstov was dismissed as commander of the 106th Guards Airborne Division by the military command. The dismissal of Selivyorstov, who was noted for being protective of his troops, came after he had appealed to the Russian military command for better conditions for his men. The 106th was tasked with the protection of the northern flank of Bakhmut around Soledar.

As of early 2026, he is believed to be the field commander of Russia's Africa Corps in Mali.

== Awards and decorations ==
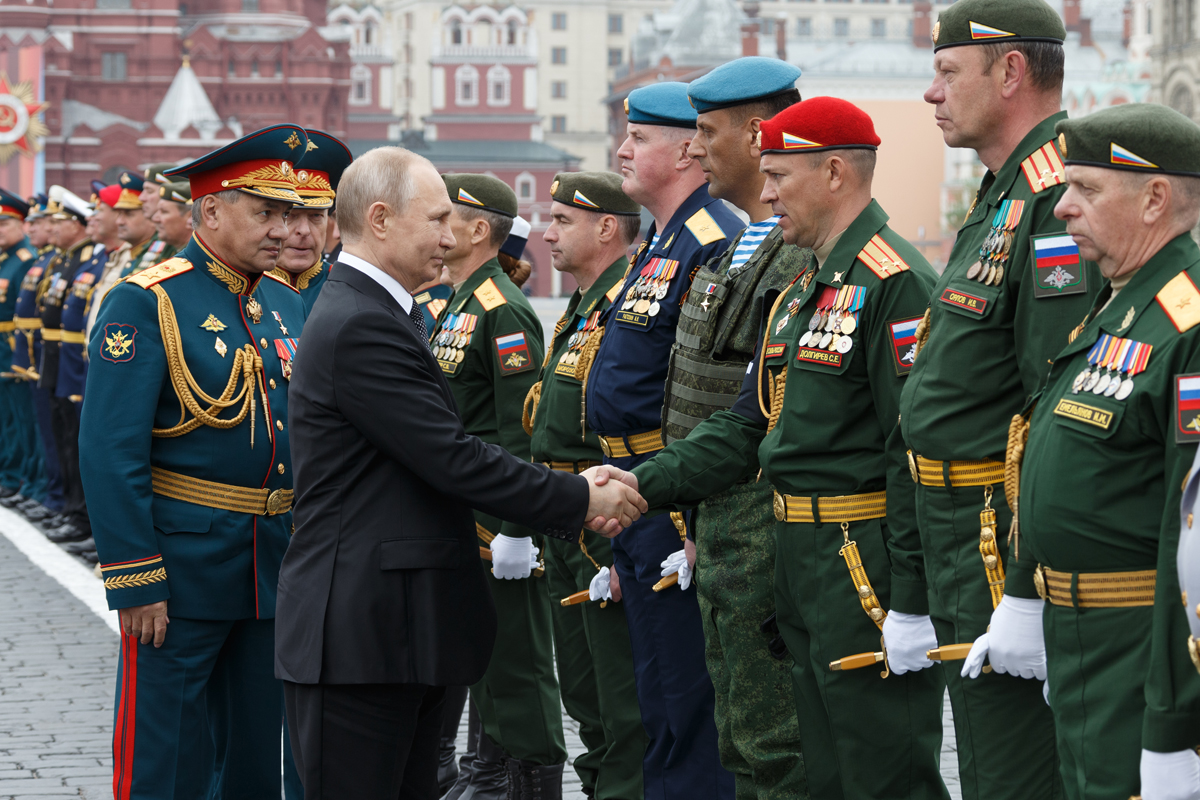
President Vladimir Putin shaking hands with Selivyorstov at the 2019 Victory Day parade.

- Hero of the Russian Federation (25 December 2014)
- Order "For Merit to the Fatherland", 4th class
- Order of Alexander Nevsky (2023)
- Order of Courage (2004 and 2006)
- Order of Military Merit (2022)
- Medal "For Courage" (2000)
- Other medals

== Personal life ==
He is married to Svetlana, and they have two sons and a daughter. One of his sons, Vyacheslav, is also a graduate of the Ryazan Guards Higher Airborne Command School is serving as an officer in the Airborne Forces.

On 1 August 2026 a bomb exploded in a high-end Moscow restaurant, killing three on scene, injuring 21 including two more who reportedly died in hospital. Selivyorstov is speculated as a possible target, along with General Aleksandr Chayko.

== Notes ==
Military offices
Preceded by Viktor Gunaza	Commander of the 331st Guards Airborne Regiment; 2018–2019	Succeeded by Oleg Shmelyov
Preceded by Viktor Gunaza	Commander of the 31st Guards Air Assault Brigade; 2020–2021	Succeeded by Sergey Karasyev
Preceded by Yevgeny Tonkikh	Commander of the 106th Guards Airborne Division; 2021–2023; Acting: 2021	Succeeded by Aleksandr Nemolyayev
