= 137th Guards Airborne Regiment =

- Russian: 137-й парашютно-десантный Кубанский казачий ордена Красной Звезды полк
- 137th Guards Airborne Regiment shoulder sleeve insignia
- Active: 1948–present
- Country: Russia
- Branch: Russian Airborne Forces
- Size: Regiment
- Part of: 106th Guards Tula Airborne Division
- Garrison/HQ: Ryazan; MUN 41450
- Engagements: War in Donbas • Battle of Ilovaisk; Russian invasion of Ukraine • Battle of Izyum • Battle of Bakhmut
- Decorations: Order of the Red Star; Kuban Cossacks

Commanders
- Current commander: Guards Colonel Roman Andreyevich Borsuk

The 137th Guards Airborne Regiment (military unit 41450) at Ryazan is a formation of the Russian Airborne Troops. It is part of the 106th Guards Tula Airborne Division.

In 2014, the regiment was involved in the Russian military intervention in Ukraine. It fought again in the Russian invasion of Ukraine in 2022. At the Battle of Izium (counteroffensive phase) the unit fell into an ambush, losing their commander, Lieutenant Colonel Pavel Krivov.

== History ==
The regiment was formed on 1 October 1948 in Ryazan as the 137th Guards Air-Landing Regiment of the 11th Guards Airborne Division. In 1949 it was converted into an airborne regiment. In May 1955 it became part of the 106th Guards Airborne Division after the 11th Guards Airborne Division was disbanded.

A battalion of the regiment was involved in the August 1991 Soviet coup attempt, guarding the Russian White House against potential assault.

On 4 April 2024, Michael Gloss, the son of a CIA Deputy Director was killed while fighting in an offensive push in Donetsk, Ukraine. Gloss was a member of the regiment.
