= Alexander Utvenko =

Red Army Lieutenant general

Alexander Ivanovich Utvenko
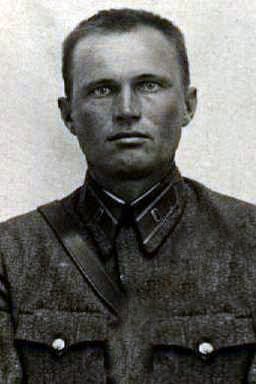
- Utvenko c. 1940
- Native name: Александр Иванович Утвенко
- Born: 12 December 1905; Dyvin village, Korostyshiv Raion, Zhytomyr Oblast
- Died: 20 August 1963 (aged 57)
- Allegiance: Soviet Union
- Branch: Red Army
- Service years: 1924–1954
- Rank: Lieutenant general
- Commands: 19th Rifle Division; 33rd Guards Rifle Division; 274th Rifle Division; 31st Guards Rifle Corps; 38th Guards Rifle Corps; 65th Rifle Corps
- Conflicts: World War II; Battle of Stalingrad; Vienna Offensive; Prague Offensive
- Awards: Order of Lenin Order of the Red Banner (3); Order of Suvorov 2nd class Order of Kutuzov 2nd class Order of Bogdan Khmelnitsky 2nd class

Alexander Ivanovich Utvenko (Russian: Александр Иванович Утвенко; 12 December 1905 – 20 August 1963) was a Red Army Lieutenant general. Utvenko became a Red Army officer in the interwar period and was given command of a division after the German invasion of the Soviet Union. He fought in the Battle of Smolensk (1941), the Yelnya Offensive and the Battle of Moscow.

In December 1941 Utvenko was wounded and after taking the Vystrel courses was given command of the 274th Rifle Division in May 1942. Utvenko took command of the 33rd Guards Rifle Division in August and led that division in the Battle of Stalingrad. In April 1943 he became commander of the 31st Guards Rifle Corps and led it in the Donbass Strategic Offensive (August 1943). In the spring of 1944, he began an accelerated course at the Military Academy of the General Staff. After graduating in early 1945 he became commander of the 38th Guards Rifle Corps which fought in the Vienna Offensive and Prague Offensive in the last months of the war. Postwar Utvenko continued to command the corps which in the summer of 1946 became an airborne unit. He graduated from the Military Academy of the General Staff and became commander of the 65th Rifle Corps. During the early 1950s he served in positions at the Frunze Military Academy and retired in 1954.

== Early life ==
Alexander Utvenko was born on 12 December 1905 in what is now the village of Dyvin in Korostyshiv Raion in Zhytomyr Oblast. In 1924, he was drafted into the Red Army. Utvenko graduated from the Kharkov Red Commanders School in 1927. In October of that year, he was posted to the 136th Rifle Regiment of the 46th Rifle Division as the commander of a machine gun platoon. He served in the regiment as the commander and commissar of a machine gun company. In August 1938, he transferred to the reserve but in December was returned to service as the deputy commander of the 56th Rifle Regiment of the 19th Rifle Division. In August 1939, Utvenko became the commander of the 315th Rifle Regiment, renumbered from the 56th.

== World War II ==
In July 1941, Utvenko became the commander of the 19th Rifle Division, which he led during the Battle of Smolensk, the Yelnya Offensive and the Vyazma Defensive Operation. In December 1941, the division became part of the 43rd Army and fought in the counterattack at Moscow in the Naro-Fominsk axis. On 17 December, Utvenko was wounded and after discharge from the hospital in March was enrolled in the Vystrel courses. On 10 May 1942, he became the commander of the 274th Rifle Division in the Moscow Defence Zone. On 16 August Utvenko became commander of the 33rd Guards Rifle Division on the Stalingrad Front. He was promoted to Major general on 14 October 1942. The 33rd Guards Rifle Division fought in the Battle of Stalingrad as part of the 62nd Army. In December, the division was advanced to the Myshkova River, where it helped repulse Operation Winter Storm. The division then fought in an advance in the direction of Rostov, where it captured Novocherkassk. For his leadership of the division, Utvenko was awarded the Order of Suvorov, 2nd class on 31 March.

In April 1943, Utvenko became the commander of the 31st Guards Rifle Corps, part of the 5th Shock Army. The corps fought in the Donbass Strategic Offensive, during which it captured Snizhne and Yenakiieve. On 22 December Utvenko was awarded the Order of Kutuzov 2nd class. He was promoted to Lieutenant general on 17 January 1944. From February to May 1944 he received medical treatment. In May Utvenko began an accelerated course at the Military Academy of the General Staff. In March 1945, after graduating from an accelerated course at the Military Academy of the General Staff, he became the commander of the 38th Guards Rifle Corps. The 38th Guards Rifle Corps fought in the Vienna Offensive in April. For his leadership Utvenko was awarded the Order of Bogdan Khmelnitsky 2nd class on 28 April. In early May, the corps fought in the Prague Offensive.

== Postwar ==
After the war, Utvenko continued in command of the corps. He graduated from the Military Academy of the General Staff in May 1948, after which Utvenko commanded the 65th Rifle Corps. Utvenko became the head of a course and then a faculty member at Frunze Military Academy in July 1951. In 1954, he was transferred to the reserve and died on 20 August 1963 in Moscow.
