= St. Paraskeva Pyatnitsa Church (Manychskaya) =

Church in Rostov Oblast, Russia

Church of Saint Paraskeva Pyatnitsa
- Russian: Церковь Параскевы Пятницы
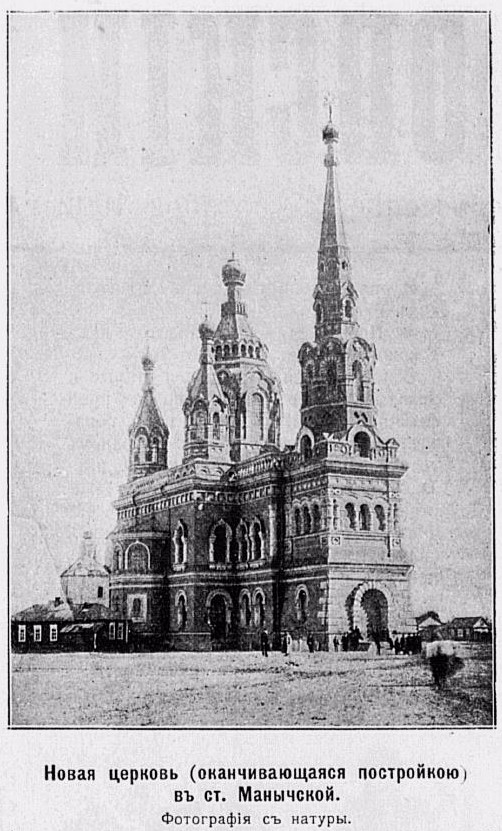
- Church of Saint Paraskeva Pyatnitsa, the beginning of the 20th century
- Church of Saint Paraskeva Pyatnitsa
- 47.2366°N 40.2608°E
- Location: Manychskaya village, Bagayevsky District, Rostov Oblast, Russia
- Country: Russia
- Denomination: Russian Orthodox Church

History
- Status: Parish church
- Dedication: Paraskeva Pyatnitsa

Architecture
- Completed: 1904

The Church of Saint Paraskeva Pyatnitsa (Russian: Церковь Параскевы Пятницы; also known as Military Cossack Cathedral, Russian: Войсковой казачий собор) is a Russian Orthodox church in Manychskaya village, Bagayevsky District, Rostov Oblast, Russia. It belongs to the Diocese of Shakhty of Russian Orthodox Church. It was built in 1904 on the project of architect Ilya Zlobin. It is also officially declared as an object of cultural heritage of Russia.

== History ==
The first mention of a church in the name of the Great Martyr Paraskeva dates to 1748. This church later became dilapidated, so it was rebuilt and reconsecrated in 1763. From 1801 to 1805, the church was dismantled, moved to a new place and rebuilt. Since 1862 the church has had a parochial school.

A new stone Church of Saint Paraskeva Pyatnitsa was laid in 1878 (according to other sources, its construction began in 1893 or in 1897). In 1904 construction works were finished and the church was consecrated.

In 1934, during the Soviet anti-religious campaign, the church was looted. It was officially closed in 1936, though it continued to function into World War II for some time. During the war the church building served as a bomb shelter. In the postwar years, it was used as a granary. The bell tower was dismantled and its bricks were used as construction material during Nikita Khrushchev's rule.

In 1990 the church building was given to Russian Orthodox Church. Religious services are held there since 1992. In 2001 the church was renovated.
