= Arpachin =

- khutor
- Location within Russia
- Coordinates: 47°13′00″N 40°10′50″E
- Country: Russia
- Oblast: Rostov
- Rayon: Bagayevsky

Population (2010)
  - Total: 1,469

Arpachin (Russian: Арпачи́н), is a village (Khutor) in Bagayevsky District of Rostov Oblast, Russia. It is located on the left bank of the Don River. Population: 1,469 (2010 Census), 1,527 (2002 census); 1,441 (1989 Soviet census).;

Arpachin was founded in 1757 by Ivan Manotskov.
