= 274th Rifle Division =

- Active: 1st formation: July–October 1941; 2nd formation: March 1942 – summer 1945
- Country: Soviet Union
- Branch: Red Army
- Type: Rifle division
- Engagements: World War II
- Decorations: Order of the Red Banner (2nd formation); Order of Suvorov 2nd class (2nd formation)
- Battle honours: Yartsevo (2nd formation)

Commanders
- Notable commanders: Alexander Utvenko; Pavel Melnikov; Vasily Shulga

The 274th Rifle Division (Russian: 274-я стрелковая дивизия) was an infantry division of the Soviet Union's Red Army during World War II, formed twice.

The division was first formed in the summer of 1941 and was destroyed in Ukraine during the fall of that year, Reformed in the spring of 1942, the division served through the entire war before being disbanded postwar in the summer of 1945.

== History ==
=== First Formation ===
The 274th began forming on 10 July 1941 at Zaporizhia, part of the Odessa Military District. Its basic order of battle included the 961st, 963rd, and the 965th Rifle Regiments, as well as the 814th Artillery Regiment. Still incomplete when the front line reached the division, the 274th was assigned to the Southern Front's 12th Army, defending the lower Dnieper. After the Soviet encirclement in the Battle of Kiev, the 1st Panzer Group advanced south into the front's northern flank in the rear of the 12th Army. The division, which had never received its full complement of artillery or anti-tank weapons, suffered heavy losses and was forced to retreat. On 1 October, the 961st Rifle Regiment was detached to the 15th Rifle Division, and by 20 October the division's remnants were used as replacements for the 4th Rifle Division.

=== Second Formation ===
The 274th was formed for a second time from March to 10 May 1942 in the Moscow Military District. The division retained the same basic order of battle as the first formation, but added the 150th Anti-Tank Battalion. After its commander was assigned on 10 May, the division was transferred to the Moscow Defence Zone from the Moscow Military District training command. The 274th became part of the Reserve of the Supreme High Command's 4th Reserve Army a month later, and was part of the Kalinin Front's 29th Army by the end of July. The army was moved to the Western Front in August, and the division transferred to the front's 30th Army in October. From April to December 1943, the division was part of the front's 31st Army. In the third phase of Operation Suvorov 31st Army attacked the positions of the 18th Panzergrenadier Division 12 km east of Yartsevo on the morning of 15 September. Three days later the 274th, led by Lt. Col. Pyotr Dodogorsky's 961st Rifle Regiment, formed the vanguard in 31st Army's battle for the city, which was secured by 19 September. The division was awarded a battle honor for its role in the fighting.

The 274th was transferred to the 33rd Army's 36th Rifle Corps at the end of the year. In April 1944, the division became part of the 1st Belorussian Front's 69th Army, and was assigned to the army's 61st Rifle Corps. The division remained part of the corps and the 69th Army until the end of the war. The division received the honorifics "Yartsevo Red Banner Order of Suvorov" for its actions, and was disbanded in the summer of 1945 with the Group of Soviet Forces in Germany.
