= Magomed Tankayev =

Soviet military leader

- Магомед Танкаев
- Born: 25 October 1919; Urada, Gunibskiy okrug, Dagestan Oblast, Mountain Republic
- Died: 26 April 1998 (aged 78); Moscow, Russia
- Military career
- Allegiance: Soviet Union
- Branch: Red Army / Soviet Army
- Service years: 1939–1988
- Rank: Colonel-general
- Commands: 106th Guards Airborne Division (1960-1961); Northern Group of Forces (1968-1973)
- Conflicts: World War II; Battle of Smolensk; Battle of Stalingrad; Donbas Offensive; Korsun–Shevchenkovsky Offensive; Lvov-Sandomierz Offensive; Battle of Prague
- Awards: Order of Lenin; Order of the October Revolution; Order of the Red Banner (4x); Order of the Patriotic War, 1st class; Order of the Red Star and other awards
- Other work: Deputy of the Supreme Soviet of the Dagestan ASSR; Deputy of the Supreme Soviet of the Soviet Union

Magomed Tankayevich Tankayev (Russian: Магомед Танкаевич Танкаев; 25 October 1919 – 26 April 1998) was a Soviet military leader of Avar origin who served as chief of the Northern Group of Forces in 1968-1973 and representative of the Warsaw Pact Supreme Command in East Germany in 1974-1978.

== Biography ==
Magomed Tankayevich Tankayev was born in 1919 in Urada, a village in the mountainous Dagestani region of MRNC northern Caucasus and came from a peasant background. He was an ethnic Avar.

A talented school student, he went on to study the science of agronomy at the Dagestan Agro-Pedagogical Institute (now Dagestan State University) for several years in the 1930s and entered the Red Army in 1939.

=== World War II service ===
Magomed Tankayev was trained at an infantry officers' course in Krasnodar before the war. He was commissioned as a junior officer on 16 June 1941 and joined the front lines soon after the German attack on the Soviet Union. He fought at the Battle of Smolensk, commanded a company of soldiers of the Kalinin Front, and served with the 302nd Rifle Division of the 51st Army at the Battle of Stalingrad.

Tankayev assumed command of the 823rd Rifle Regiment in February 1943 and led this regiment during the fighting in the Donbas and Left-Bank regions of Ukraine in 1943, the Korsun-Shevchenkovsky Offensive in Ukraine in early 1944, and the Lvov-Sandomierz Operation in western Ukraine and eastern Poland during the summer of 1944. Tankayev was subsequently named commander of the 460th Rifle Regiment within Major-General Fyodor Krasavin's 100th Rifle Divisionwhich fought as part of Colonel-General Pavel Kurochkin's 60th Army of the 1st Ukrainian Front for the remainder of the war.

In January 1945, Krasavin's 100th Rifle Division assisted the 322nd Rifle Division in crushing the German troops in the Oświęcim area in order to enter the Auschwitz concentration camp, whose horrors Tankayev witnessed at the time of the liberation. The regiment went on to fight at the Battle of Prague in the spring of 1945.

Magodem Tankayev was in Prague at the time of the victory over Nazi Germany in May 1945. His brother Gitinomagomed had been killed at the end of the Battle of Berlin in April 1945.

=== After World War II ===
Tankayev graduated from the Frunze Military Academy in Moscow in 1948 and served in the Belorussian Military District afterward. He was promoted from colonel to major-general in 1958 and was elected to the Supreme Soviet of the Dagestan Autonomous Soviet Socialist Republic in 1959. Tankayev graduated from the General Staff Academy in 1960 and led the elite 106th Guards Airborne Division in 1960-1961.

Promoted to lieutenant-general in 1965, Tankayev was a deputy commander of the Odessa Military District in the late 1960s. He was elected to the Supreme Soviet of the USSR ahead of its seventh convocation in 1966, selected as to succeed Colonel-General Ivan Shkadov as commander of the Northern Group of Forces in December 1968, and elevated to colonel-general in 1969. He continued to serve with the Northern Group of Forces until 1973.

Colonel-General Tankayev returned to Moscow to head the Main Directorate of Military Colleges of the USSR Ministry of Defense in 1973-1974 and served in East Germany as chief representative of the Warsaw Pact Supreme Command to the National People's Army in 1974-1978.

Tankayev headed the Military Institute of the Ministry of Defense of the USSR from 1978 to 1988.

He died at the age of seventy-eight after ten years in retirement in 1998.

== Awards ==
=== Soviet ===
- Order of Lenin
- Order of the October Revolution
- Order of the Red Banner, four times
- Order of the Patriotic War, 1st class
- Order of the Red Star

=== Foreign ===
People's Republic of Poland

- Commander's Cross with Star of the Order of Polonia Restituta

German Democratic Republic

- Patriotic Order of Merit

== Commemoration ==
Colonel-General Tankayev's life has been the subject of several books in the Russian language since the 1980s.

General Tankayev Street in Makhachkala, capital of the Russian Federation's Republic of Dagestan, carries the name of the colonel-general.

A statute of Magomed Tankayev, crafted by sculptor Aligadzhi Saygadov and architect Abdula Magomedov, was unveiled on Batyray Street in Makhachkala by Mayor Said Amirov on 30 October 2009.
