= Bolharka, Mykolaiv Oblast =

Coordinates: 47°51′09″N 30°25′17″E

Bolharka (Ukrainian: Болгарка) is a village in Pervomaisk Raion, Mykolaiv Oblast of Ukraine.

The village was founded in 1915. According to the 2001 Ukrainian census, its population was 68. The postal code of the village is 56311 and its telephone code is 5135. It occupies an area of .274 square kilometers.

The Ukrzaliznytsia long-distance trains 148 and 149 which travel from Odesa to Kyiv pass through Bolharka.

== Notable residents ==
- Vasily Larin (1908–1957), Soviet military commander and general
