= Operation Stream =

2025 Russian operation during the invasion of Ukraine

- Part of the Kursk campaign
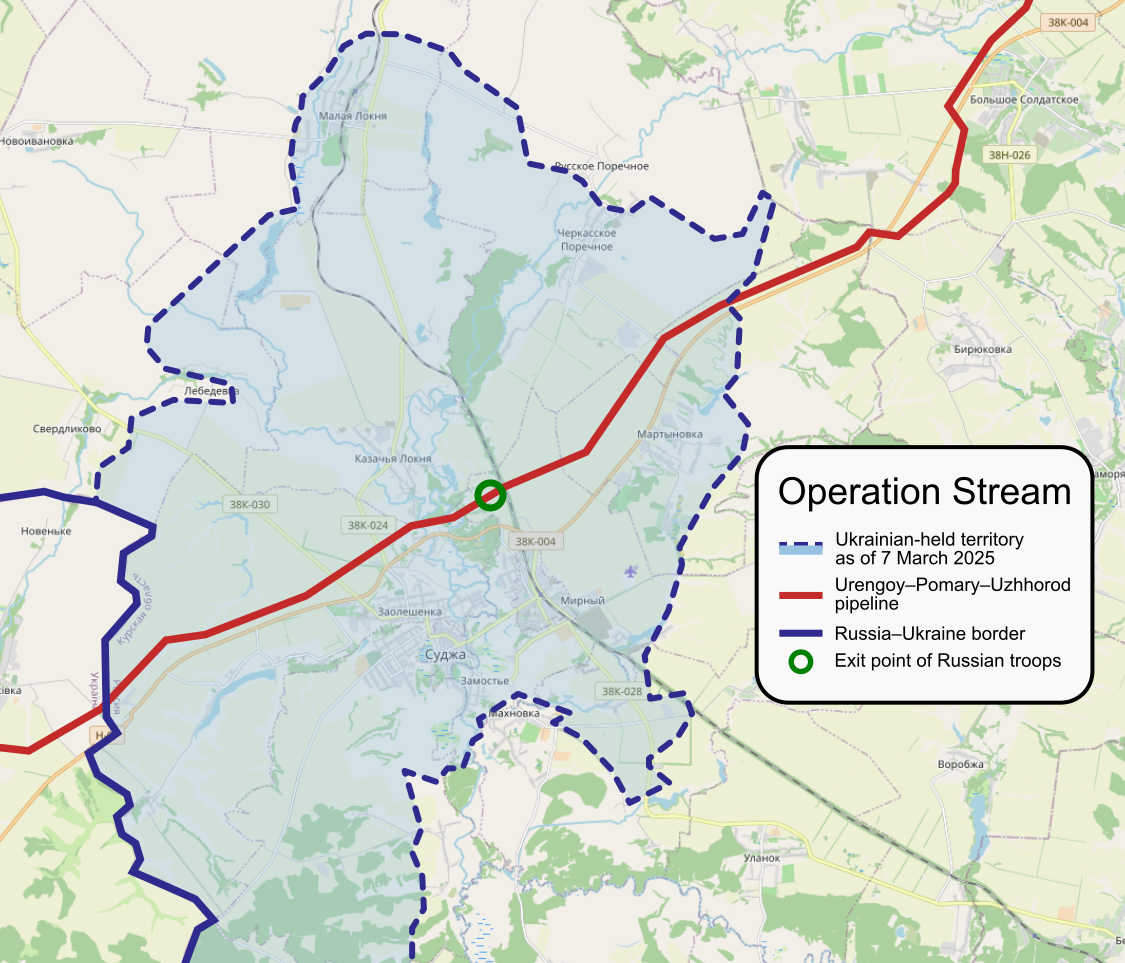
- Map showing the pipeline and exit point location
- Type: Tunnel raid
- Location: Sudzha, Kursk Oblast
- Objective: Infiltration behind enemy lines
- Date: 8 March 2025
- Executed by: 11th Guards Air Assault Brigade; 106th Guards Airborne Division; 30th Motor Rifle Regiment; Veterans Brigade; Vostok Brigade; Naval infantry
- Outcome: Russian operational success Ukrainian retreat from Sudzha and nearby settlements

Operation Stream (Russian: Операция "Поток"), also called Operation Pipe, was a military operation carried out by Russian troops who crawled through the disused Urengoy–Pomary–Uzhhorod pipeline with the goal of attacking Ukrainian units from the rear and surrounding them near Sudzha during the Russian counteroffensive into the Ukrainian-held part of the Kursk region. The operation possibly involved fighters from the 11th Guards Air Assault Brigade, the 30th Motor Rifle Regiment, the Veterans and Vostok volunteer brigades, the 106th Guards Airborne Division, and Naval infantry.

== Chronology ==
=== Background and preparation ===
In August 2024, the Ukrainian Armed Forces invaded Kursk Oblast and occupied a large part of it. By mid-February 2025, Russian forces managed to retake more than half of the lost territory, isolating Ukrainian forces in a narrow wedge centered around the town of Sudzha and its surrounding settlements. The town is located near the Urengoy–Pomary–Uzhhorod pipeline, through which Russian gas was supplied to Europe until Ukraine terminated all Russian transit on January 1, 2025.

According to a Russian newspaper, Izvestia, the preparations for a pipeline raid began in January. This strategy had already been used by the Veterans brigade in the capture of Avdiivka, when a group of Russian fighters managed to get into the section of the city occupied by Ukrainian troops through a partially flooded drainage pipe. They were given the task of attacking the Ukrainians in the rear in Sudzha.

The Veterans spent weeks digging a 500-meter-long underground tunnel to conceal the entrance to the pipeline. Several days were spent pumping out the residual gas. The oxygen level inside the pipe was low, so soldiers were instructed to stay at least 10 meters apart, though many troops still huddled together in tight groups due to stress. To compensate for the lack of oxygen, vents were made in the pipe, but they were often filled with earth. The lack of oxygen and toxic fumes led to several people getting hospitalized, with some reportedly dying from methane poisoning. According to a Russian commander involved in the operation, call sign "Zombie," the pipeline was equipped with toilets, was filled with oxygen, and contained ammunition and food. Cargo carts and e-scooters were used to move supplies through the pipe. Soldiers moved through the pipe unarmed, receiving weapons only at the exit point.

=== Execution ===
On March 8, 2025, at around 05:00–06:00, the assault party emerged from the pipe and the Russian Armed Forces launched a large-scale counteroffensive in Kursk Oblast. On the same day, pro-Russian military bloggers and Ukrainian sources reported that Russian servicemen had traveled nearly 16 kilometres (9.9 mi) through a 1.4-meter diameter gas pipeline, reached the rear of the Ukrainian military near the city of Sudzha, and dug in, walking in the pipe for two days and spending four more days underground waiting for the order to attack. Videos that surfaced online on Telegram show Russian soldiers "marching" equipped with gas masks, while others also report soldiers cursing and complaining about the commanders who sent them on the mission. At this point, Ukrainian military blogger Yuriy Butusov said the deployed Russian force consisted of an assault company, the Russian forces that were sent on this mission may have numbered to 600—800 men, with around 100 emerging from the pipe.

Russian soldiers that emerged from the pipe had marked themselves with blue tape, the same color as the Ukrainian army uses, in order to deceive the Ukrainian forces and make them think "that their own units were advancing." According to the Institute for the Study of War (ISW), this may amount to perfidy, which is considered a war crime.

According to Ukrainska Pravda, Ukrainian soldiers were aware of the Russian plan five days in advance, after the Russians began clearing the exit zone with glide bombs, but their attention was diverted by a Russian breakthrough near Kurilovka south of Sudzha, and they were unable to blow up or block the pipe in advance due to poor logistics. According to Ukrainian officer Myroslav Hai, commanders of a Ukrainian air assault brigade set up an ambush and inflicted "very heavy" losses on the Russians, possibly up to 80% of their force, claiming to have repulsed them.

According to other sources, the operation managed to achieve a certain element of surprise, since the use of the pipeline provided protection from surveillance by Ukrainian drones. The War Zone notes that it is likely that after exiting the pipe, at least some of the fighters joined other Russian troops already in the Sudzha area.

According to The Financial Times, after the raid, the Ukrainian side began to retreat. According to Ukrainian soldiers interviewed by The Wall Street Journal, some Ukrainian units were already withdrawing. They said that the pipeline raid caused panic and prompted some field commanders to start retreating without an order from their higher-ups to avoid being captured. Soldiers interviewed by Ukrainska Pravda said that the most damage to the Ukrainian forces was caused by the left flank strike in February and the south strike in early March. These, combined with the raid and Russians destroying bridges around Sudzha, forced Ukrainians to retreat.

On March 10, the Russian side stated that the operation had disoriented Ukrainian units, which led to the liberation of several settlements.

== Strength and losses ==
According to Russian officials, 800 fighters were engaged in crawling the pipeline. The War Zone reprints reports of total of 100 Russian soldiers participating, although Ukrainian sources report up to 100 soldiers emerging from the pipe near Sudzha. According to the Ukrainian military, Russian losses were heavy, with some suffocating in the pipe, and only 90 surviving the crawl, the exit, and making it into Sudzha.

== Analysis ==
The operation was deemed a "surprise operation" by Russian media.

The pipeline infiltration maneuver allowed Russian forces to bypass Ukrainian defenses generally undetected. The covert nature of the operation highlighted Russia's evolving battlefield tactics and reflected the role unconventional warfare has in modern conflict, according to the publication Firstpost.

The War Zone online magazine called the pipeline raid an "extraordinary mission" and wrote that although its results were not immediately clear, it highlighted the importance for Russian authorities to expel Ukrainian forces from the Kursk region. The publication Meduza noted that during the operation, Russian troops entered the rear of Ukrainian positions, although the data on how successful the operation was is contradictory. Radio Liberty highlighted the fact that after 8 March, Ukrainian troops lost significant territory in the Kursk region amid collapsing defence lines, and on 13 March, the Russian Ministry of Defense announced the return of control over Sudzha.

The New York Times noted that while the pipeline raid was controversial, it coincided with breakthroughs in Ukrainian defenses by Russian troops in several areas of the Kursk region.

According to military analyst Pasi Paroinen from Black Bird Group, although the exact number of participants in the operation cannot be estimated, the raid led to confusion and disarray in the ranks of the Ukrainian Armed Forces and probably triggered a retreat.
