= 104th Guards Air Assault Division =

Russian and Soviet Airborne Forces formation

104th Guards Air Assault Division (2023–present) 104th Guards Airborne Division (1946–1998) 104th Guards Rifle Division (1944–1946) 11th Guards Airborne Division (1943–1944)
- Russian: 104-я гвардейская десантно-штурмовая ордена Кутузова II степени дивизия
- Great emblem of the 104th Guards Air Assault Division
- Active: 1943–1998; 2023–present
- Country: Soviet Union (1943–1991); Russia (1991–1998; 2023–present)
- Branch: Soviet Airborne Forces; Russian Airborne Forces
- Type: Airborne forces
- Role: Light Infantry; Airborne Infantry; Airmobile infantry
- Size: Division
- Part of: Southern Military District
- Garrison/HQ: Ulyanovsk; MUN 73612
- Patron: St. Elijah the Prophet
- Mottos: Себе — честь, Родине — слава! (Honour for me and glory for Motherland)
- Anniversaries: 23 December
- Engagements: World War II; Vienna Offensive; Operation Whirlwind; Soviet–Afghan War; First Nagorno-Karabakh War; War in Abkhazia; First Chechen War; Russo-Ukrainian War; Invasion of Ukraine; 2023 Ukrainian counteroffensive; Dnieper campaign (2022–present)
- Decorations: Guards; Order of Kutuzov, 2nd class

Insignia
- Sleeve patch

The 104th Guards Order of Kutuzov 2nd Class Air Assault Division (Russian: 104-я гвардейская десантно-штурмовая дивизия; MUN 73612) is a division of the Russian Airborne Forces (VDV) and formerly of the Soviet Airborne Troops. From 1998 until 2023 it was called the 31st Guards Airborne Brigade (Russian: 31-я отдельная гвардейская десантно-штурмовая бригада), and it was given its current name after being reactivated in 2023.

It was originally formed as the 11th Guards Airborne Division during World War II. In December 1944, the 11th Guards Airborne Division became the 104th Guards Rifle Division, and on 7 June 1946, the division was renamed the 104th Guards Airborne Division. It was reduced to the 31st Guards Airborne Brigade in May 1998.

== History ==
=== World War II (1943–1945) ===
The 11th Guards Airborne Division was formed on 23 December 1943 from three Guards Airborne Brigades in the Moscow Military District. It was part of the 38th Guards Airborne Corps. On 8 December 1944, it became the 104th Guards Rifle Division, part of the 9th Guards Army. In March 1945, the division was deployed to the Budapest area. In fighting from 16 to 22 March, the division inflicted heavy losses on German troops. During the final stage of the Vienna Offensive, the division captured Sankt Pölten, thus closing off routes into Vienna. On 26 April, the division was awarded the Order of Kutuzov 2nd class. On 12 May, the division reached the Vltava, meeting American troops.

On 7 June 1946, the division became the 104th Guards Airborne Division in Narva. It relocated to Ostrov in Pskov Oblast, becoming part of the 15th Guards Airborne Corps. In 1960, the division was relocated to the Transcaucasian Military District and was based in Kirovabad (now Gyandzha), in the Azerbaijani SSR. Elements were also based in Shamkhor, Baku, and Kutaisi.

Bases:

- Narva, Estonian SSR, June 1946 – April 1947
- Ostrov, Pskov Oblast, April 1947 – June 1960
- Gyandzha (Kirovabad), Azerbaijan SSR, June 1960 – August 1992 [40 43 09N, 46 23 07E]
- Ulyanovsk, Ulyanovsk Oblast, August 1992 – May 1998. [54 21 16N, 48 34 50E]

=== Afghanistan and Collapse of the USSR (1979–1998) ===
Most of the division's personnel fought in the Soviet–Afghan War. The division was located in Kirovabad during the events of the Kirovabad pogrom, in which Soviet Army forces were used to restore order. According to CFE Treaty data, on 11 November 1990, the division was equipped with 219 BMD-1 and 93 BMD-2 airborne infantry fighting vehicles, 107 BTR-D armoured personnel carriers, 72 2S9 Nona self-propelled guns, 36 BTR-RD anti-tank missile carriers, 42 BTR-ZD self-propelled anti-aircraft guns, and 6 D-30 howitzers.

In August-September 1992, the 345th Guards Airborne Regiment was redeployed to the Republic of Abkhazia and withdrawn from the division. During this period, combined units of the 104th Division took part in the armed conflicts in Georgia and Azerbaijan. In 1993, the division was redeployed to Ulyanovsk, where it was located until its reduction in 1998. From 1994 to 1996, the 104th Guards Airborne fought in the First Chechen War.

Due to a reorganization of the Russian Airborne Forces spurred by reductions in personnel strength, the division was reduced to the 31st Guards Airborne Brigade, which inherited its colors, awards, and lineage, on 1 May 1998.

In June 2015, it was announced that the 31st Guards Airborne Brigade would be upgraded to the 104th Guards Airborne Division. The new division would include three regiments at Ulyanovsk, Orenburg and Engels. Reactivation of the division from the brigade was previously announced earlier but did not eventuate. At the June 2019 Army-2019 forum, Chairman of the Defence Committee of the State Duma Vladimir Shamanov reiterated that the division would eventually be reformed, but stated that no final decision had been made on the timing.

=== Restoration (2023–present) ===
In August 2023, the Commander of the Russian Airborne Forces, Colonel General Mikhail Teplinsky, announced that the formation would be reactivated by the end of 2023. This reactivation includes reestablishing the 104th Air Assault Division (originating from the 31st Brigade) and placing the 31st Guards Airborne Brigade under the division's command. Additionally, the 119th and 299th Airborne Regiments will be integrated into the existing 106th and 98th Airborne Divisions. These measures are part of Defense Minister Sergei Shoigu's planned military unit expansions from 2022. Shoigu commented in September 2023 that the division was almost complete. In 2023, the 104th Guards Air Assault Division was recreated.

Parts of the 104th Division entered the fighting in Ukraine in November 2023. The UK Ministry of Defence assessed that the Russian 104th Guards Airborne Division likely suffered "exceptionally heavy losses and was unable to complete its assigned tasks in the Kherson region" during its first combat deployment against Ukrainian forces near Krynky on the eastern bank of the Dnieper.

After this, “Russian military bloggers called on the commander of the Dnieper group of troops, Colonel General Mikhail Teplinsky to resign.”

On February 21, 2024, the Ukrainian Armed Forces launched three missile strikes using HIMARS at a Russian military training ground near the village Podo-Kalinovka, Kherson Oblast. According to media reports, at the time of the strike, there were also military personnel of the 328th Airborne Assault Regiment of the 104th Airborne Division at the training ground. 36 military personnel were killed and another 28 were injured. Also, sources report the death of deputy commander/political commissar of the 328th airborne infantry regiment Denis Koksharov.

== Composition ==
=== 104th Guards Rifle Division (1945) ===
The 104th Guards Rifle Division included the following units.

- 328th Guards Rifle Regiment
- 332nd Guards Rifle Regiment
- 346th Guards Rifle Regiment

=== 104th Guards Airborne Division (1947) ===
The 104th Guards Airborne Division included the following units in 1947.

- 328th Guards Airborne Regiment
- 346th Guards Air-landing Regiment
- 82nd Guards Artillery Regiment

On 1 October 1948, the 346th Guards Air-landing Regiment was used to create the 21st Guards Airborne Division, and was replaced by the 337th Guards Air-landing Regiment.

=== 104th Guards Airborne Division (2024) ===
- 104th Guards Airborne Division
  - Division HQ
    - 134th Tank Battalion, military unit 34253
    - 154th Reconnaissance Battalion, military unit 12021
    - 132nd Engineer Battalion, military unit 13063
    - 720th Signal Battalion, military unit 74903
    - 24th Repair and Restoration Battalion, military unit 16559
    - 1684th Material Support Battalion, military unit 36111
    - 180th Medical Detachment, military unit 77003
  - 328th Guards Airborne Regiment, military unit 01011
  - 337th Guards Air Assault Regiment, military unit 51854
  - 345th Guards Air Assault Regiment named after Hero of the Soviet Union, Colonel-General V. A. Vostrotin, military unit 33702
  - 1180th Artillery Regiment, military unit 02364
  - 2nd Anti-Aircraft Missile Regiment, military unit 55256

== Commanders ==
The following officers commanded the 11th Guards Airborne Division, 104th Guards Rifle Division, and 104th Guards Airborne Division:

- Major general Vasily Ivanovich Ivanov (1943–1944);
- Major general Alexey Redchenko (21 February – 26 March 1945);
- Major general Ivan Fedotovich Seryogin (27 March – 5 November 1945);
- Major general Nikolai Tavartkiladze (1945–1950);
- Lieutenant colonel Alexander Startsev (1950);
- Colonel Pyotr Khvorostenko (1950–1954);
- Major general Alexei Rudakov (1954–1955);
- Major general Fyodor Dranishchev (1955–1961);
- Colonel Ivan Sineoky (1961–1963);
- Colonel Yuri Potapov (1963–1964);
- Major general Nikolai Guskov (1964–1967);
- Major general Anatoly Spirin (1968–1975);
- Major general Alexander Khomenko (1975–1981);
- Major general Nikolai Serdyukov (1981–1984);
- Major general Evgeny Semyonov (1984–1987);
- Major general Viktor Sorokin (1987–1989);
- Major general Valery Shcherbak (1990–1993);
- Major general Vadim Orlov (1993–1998).
