= 106th Guards Airborne Division =

106th Guards Tula Red Banner Orders of Kutuzov and Suvorov Airborne Division
- 106-я гвардейская воздушно-десантная Тульская Краснознамённая орденов Кутузова и Суворова дивизия
- 106th Guards Airborne Division great emblem
- Active: 1944–present
- Country: Soviet Union (1944–1991); Russia (1991–present)
- Branch: Russian Airborne Forces
- Type: Airborne forces
- Role: Light Infantry; Airborne Infantry; Airmobile infantry
- Part of: Russian Armed Forces
- Garrison/HQ: Tula
- Nickname: Tula Division
- Mottos: Нет задач невыполнимых! (There are no impossible tasks!)
- Anniversaries: 26 April
- Engagements: World War II; Soviet–Afghan War; First Chechen War; Second Chechen War; Russo-Ukrainian War; War in Donbas; Invasion of Ukraine; Battle of Bakhmut; 2023 Ukrainian counteroffensive; Kursk campaign; Operation Stream
- Decorations: Guards; Order of the Red Banner; Order of Kutuzov; Order of Suvorov
- Battle honours: Tula

Commanders
- Current commander: Maj. Gen. Alexander Nemolayev
- Notable commanders: Lt. Gen. Alexander Lebed; Col. Gen. Andrey Serdyukov

Insignia
- Sleeve patch

The 106th Guards Tula Red Banner Orders of Kutuzov and Suvorov Airborne Division (Russian: 106-я гвардейская воздушно-десантная Тульская Краснознамённая орденов Кутузова и Суворова дивизия; MUN 55599), more generally referred to as the Tula Division, is one of the four airborne divisions of the Russian Airborne Troops, the VDV (Russian: Воздушно-десантные войска, romanized: Vozdushno-desantnye voyska). Based in the city of Tula, to the south of Moscow, it is administratively located within the Moscow Military District.

== History ==
=== 1944–1992 ===
The Division was founded in January 1944 as the 16th Guards Airborne Division, and from then until the end of the Second World War fought in Hungary, Austria and Czechoslovakia (including in Prague), mostly with 38th Guards Rifle Corps of 9th Guards Army. It became the 106th Guards Rifle Division in December 1944, as all the original VDV divisions and brigades were being reconstituted as Guards Rifle formations. The Division's honorifics are 'Red Banner, Order of Kutuzov', though an early Western writer reported them as 'Dneipr-Transbaikal' seemingly incorrectly, at one point in its history.

On 7 June 1946, the 106th Guards Rifle Division was converted to an airborne division at Tula, part of the new 38th Guards Airborne Corps. On 1 October 1948, the division's 347th Guards Air Landing Regiment was used to form the 11th Guards Airborne Division. It was replaced by the new 51st Guards Air Landing Regiment, which became an airborne unit in 1949. On 5 May 1955, the 137th Guards Airborne Regiment joined the division from the disbanded 11th Guards Airborne Division. On 6 January 1959, the 110th Separate Military-Transport Aviation Squadron was formed with the division, equipped with ten Antonov An-2 transports. On 15 August 1960, the 205th Guards Artillery Regiment became the 845th Separate Guards Artillery Battalion. At the same time, the 351st Guards Airborne Regiment transferred to the 105th Guards Airborne Division and was replaced by the 105th's 331st Guards Airborne Regiment. On 27 April 1962, the 845th Separate Guards Artillery Battalion became the 1182nd Guards Artillery Regiment.

As the attention of the Soviet leadership began to shift towards their ability to project force overseas, the need for a rapidly deployable force to spearhead large-scale operations became apparent and the VDV was once again built up as such an air assault force. The Tula Division, from that point until the present day, was to be one of the most frequently-used elements of it. Two of its regiments took part in the Soviet–Afghan War. As nationalist unrest grew in the southern republics of the USSR throughout the end of the 1980s, the division was deployed to Baku, Azerbaijan, in 1988 and to Fergana, Uzbekistan, in 1990. Throughout this time the division was commanded by General Alexander Lebed.

In 1991, an attempted coup against the Soviet President Mikhail Gorbachev took place in Moscow. As the coup faltered, and the plotters lost the initiative while support for Boris Yeltsin, the President of the Russian SFSR, grew, the plotters called in reinforcements from the Tula Division, in the form of a battalion from the 137th Guards Airborne Regiment. When they arrived, Lebed stated that he had orders to secure the Parliament building, where Yeltsin's supporters were barricaded. He did not, however, give the order for his men, equipped with BMD armoured vehicles, to launch an attack. This may have been because at that point in the coup, the Tamanskaya Division was in the process of switching its own allegiance from the plotters to the parliamentarians, but whatever Lebed's rationale, the episode helped to boost his own public profile immensely. Following the failure of the coup and the dissolution of the Soviet Union, in 1992, he was appointed commander of the Russian 14th Guards Army in Moldova.

=== 1992–1999 ===
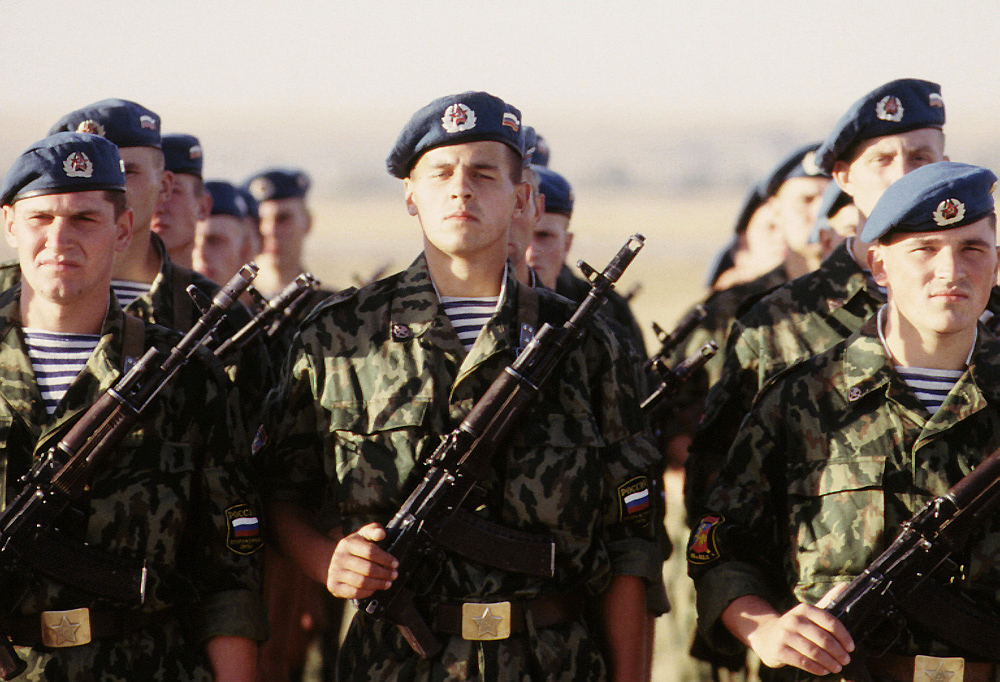
Paratroopers from the Tula Division stand to attention during an exercise in Kazakhstan, 1999.

The 119th Guards Airborne Regiment joined the division from the 7th Guards Airborne Division in August 1993, replacing the 331st Guards Airborne Regiment, which had been transferred to the 98th Guards Airborne Division.

In 1994, the Russian Army was ordered into the breakaway southern republic of Chechnya by Yeltsin, then President of the Russian Federation, after the refusal of the separatist government to surrender to Moscow's authority, beginning the First Chechen War. Battalions of the Tula Division were attached to 'Group West' (the western element of the three-pronged invasion of Chechnya). They took part, in December that year, in the first Battle of Grozny, helping to capture the city's central railway station, which had proved to be one of the most difficult and costly strategic points in Grozny for the Russians to capture.

In March 1995, the battalions were transferred to the command of 'Group North' and continued fighting, notably around Argun. In May, they withdrew from Chechnya. The division's losses in the first war are unclear: 36 of its soldiers have been confirmed killed in action, but the number missing in action is around 200.

=== 1999–2004 ===
The Second Chechen War began in 1999. With Moscow determined to avoid a repeat of the quagmire that the first war had become, the Russian force committed in 1999 was larger, better equipped and better organised. The Tula Division's contribution to that force was the 51st and 119th Parachute Landing Regiments. Its losses in this war were still considerable but less than in the first: 67 of its soldiers were reported either killed or missing in action. For its actions in the second campaign, the Tula Division was awarded the MoD Pennant.

In 2001, after the September 11 terrorist attacks in the United States, paratroopers from the division were sent to Afghanistan to evacuate the staff of the Russian embassy in Kabul, so as to ensure their safety in the face of the American military campaign in support of the Northern Alliance's advance towards the city.

==== The case of Private Alexei Pinyaev ====
In March 2000, Novaya Gazeta journalist Pavel Voloshin reported the account of Private Alexei P. (later identified as Pinyaev) of the 137th Guards Airborne Regiment. Pinyaev guarded a storehouse with weapons and ammunition near the city of Ryazan. Together with a friend, he entered the storehouse to see the weapons. The friends were surprised to see that the storehouse contained sacks with the word "sugar" on them. Pinyaev and his friend were discouraged, but didn't want to leave the storehouse empty-handed. The two paratroopers cut a hole in one of the bags and put some sugar in a plastic bag. They made tea with the sugar, but the taste of the tea was terrible. They became frightened because the substance might turn out to be saltpeter, and brought the plastic bag to a platoon commander. He consulted a sapper, who identified the substance as hexogen.

According to Felshtinsky and Pribylovsky, after the newspaper report FSB officers descended on Pinyayev’s unit, accused them of divulging a state secret and told them, "You guys can't even imagine what serious business you’ve got yourselves tangled up in." The regiment later sued publishers of Novaya Gazeta for insulting the honour of the Russian Army, since there was no Private Alexei Pinyayev in the regiment, according to their statement.

A report aired by ORT in March 2000 and created by journalist Leonid Grozin and operator Dmitry Vishnevoy accused Novaya Gazeta of lying. According to Grozin and Vishnevoy, there is no storehouse at the test range of the 137th Regiment. Alexei Pinyaev has admitted meeting with Pavel Voloshin, but claimed that he was merely asked to confirm a pre-conceived story.

At an FSB press conference in 2001, Private Pinyayev stated that there was no hexogen in the 137th Airborne Regiment and that he was hospitalised in December 1999 and no longer visited the test range.

=== 2004 onwards ===
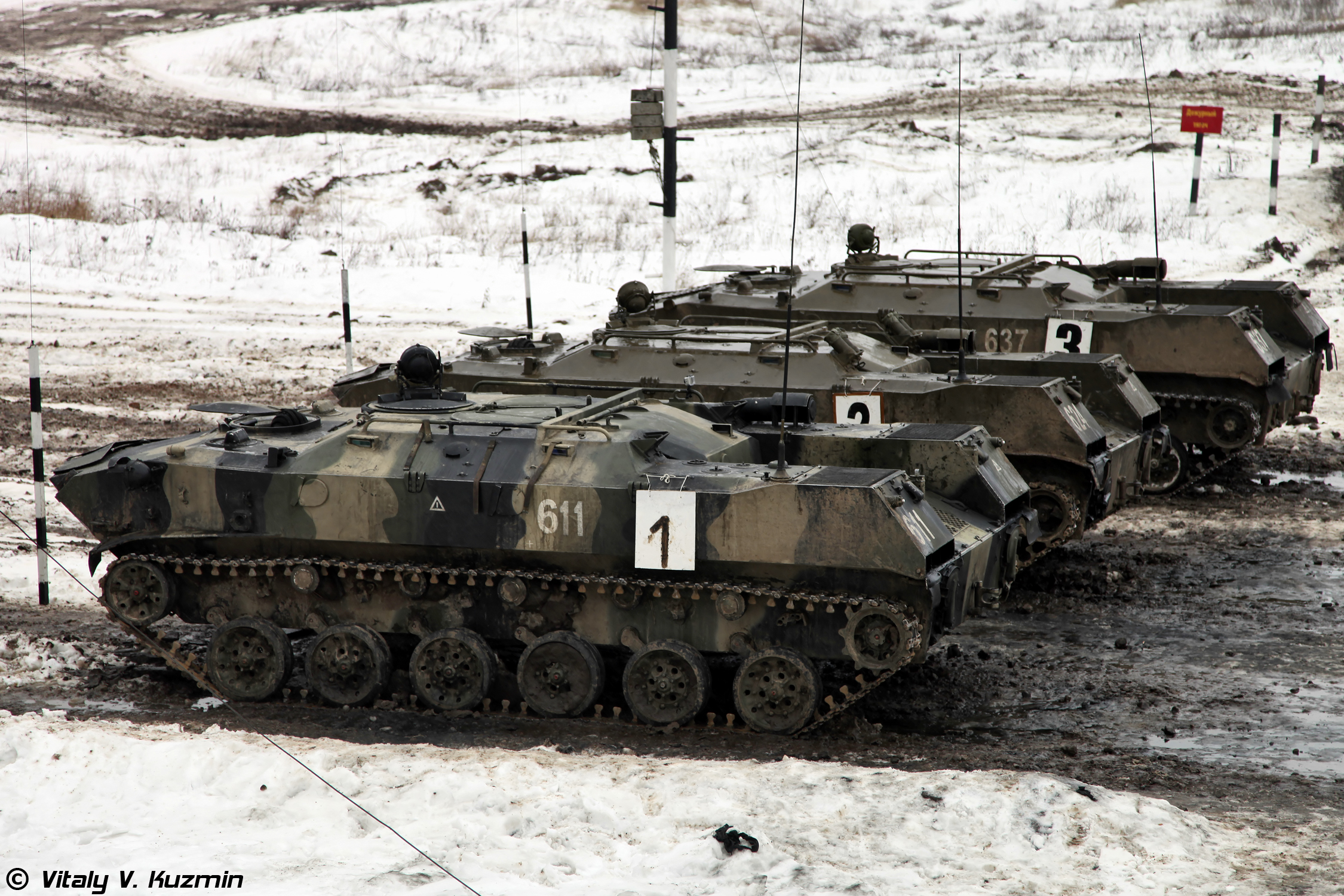
BTR-D of the 106th Division

On 26 April 2004, the Tula Division celebrated its 60th anniversary.

In August 2014 the division's 137th Guards Airborne Regiment participated in the war in Donbas.

On 13 August 2015, the division was given the honorific name "Tula".

The division took part in the 2022 Russian invasion of Ukraine but withdrew to Belarus at the end of March to be redeployed in Valuyki at the Eastern war theatre. Both the 51st Regiment and the 137th Regiment took part in the battle of Bakhmut. On 15 July 2023, Major general Vladimir Seliverstov, the Divisions commander, was dismissed of his command after appealing to the Russian military command for better conditions for his troops.

On 4 July 2025, the division was awarded the Order of Suvorov.

== Composition ==
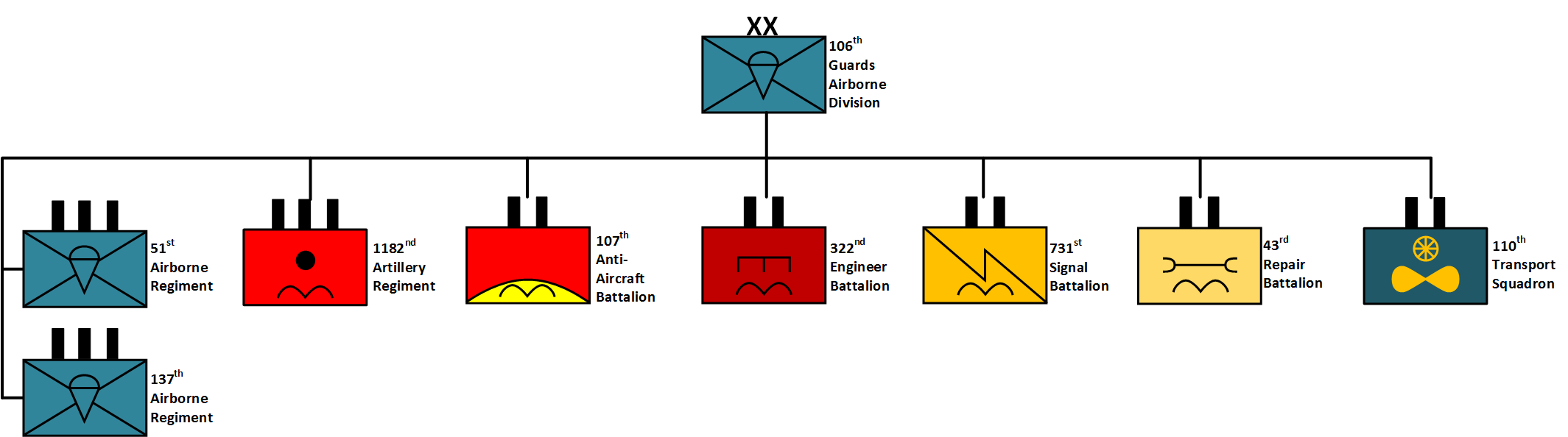
106th Guards Airborne Division

In 2006, the subordinate units of the division were as follows:

- 51st Guards Airborne Regiment, Tula
- 137th Guards Airborne Regiment, Ryazan
- 1182nd Guards Artillery Regiment, Yefremov
- 107th Anti-Aircraft Regiment, Naro-Fominsk
- 322nd Engineer Battalion, Tula
- 731st Communications Battalion, Tula
- 43rd Repair Battalion, Tula
- 110th Transport Squadron, Tula

By 2017 the division expanded and added further units and has the following composition.

- 173rd Guards Reconnaissance Battalion, в/ч 54392 (Tula)
- 51st Guards Airborne Regiment, в/ч 33842 (Tula)
- 137th Guards Airborne Regiment, в/ч 41450 (Ryazan) (BMD-4M 62 units)
- 1182nd Guards Artillery Regiment, в/ч 93723 (Naro-Fominsk)
- 1st Guards Anti-aircraft Missile Regiment, в/ч 71298 (Naro-Fominsk)
- N-I Tank company (Tula)
- 388th Guards Engineering Battalion, (Tula)
- 731st Guards Communications Battalion, (Tula)
- Electronic Warfare Company (Tula)
- 1060th Material Support Battalion, (Slobodka)
- 970th Airborne Support Company, (Tula)
- 39th separate medical detachment (airmobile), (Tula)
- 1883rd station of Postal Communication, (Tula)

In 2023 additional units were identified.

- 119th Airborne Regiment (Note: According to a 23 April 2025 article by iStories (Russian: Важные истории), numerous Serbs are serving in this unit as foreigners during the Russo-Ukrainian War.)

- Volki (Wolves) Detachment
- Volki (Wolves) Detachment (Note: According to a 6 October 2023 BBC article, numerous Serbs are serving in this unit as foreigners during the Russo-Ukrainian War.)

== Commanding officers ==
=== During the USSR ===
- Major-General Aleksandr Fyodorovich Kazankin (1943–1944)
- Major-General Konstantin Nikolayevich Vindushev (1944–1946)
- Major-General Ivan Nikitich Konev (1946–1947)
- Major-General Afanasy Romanovich Kopychko (1947–1949)
- Colonel Aleksandr Dimitriyevich Yepanshin (1949–1951)
- Major-General Aleksandr Akimovich Gerasimov (1951–1955)
- Major-General Aleksandr Andreyevich Koreshchenko (1955–1960)
- Major-General Magomed Tankayevich Tankayev (1960–1961)
- Colonel Konstantin Yakovlevich Kurochnik (1961–1964)
- Major-General Yuri Mikhailovich Potapov (1964–1969)
- Major-General Aleksandr Ivanovich Pitkov (1969–1972)
- Major-General Anatoly Mikhailovich Dobrovolsky (1972–1976)
- Major-General Yevgeny Nikolayevich Podkolzin (1976–1980)
- Major-General Gennady Vasilyevich Filatov (1980–1984)
- Major-General Fyodor Ivanovich Serdechny (1984–1988)
- Major-General Aleksandr Ivanovich Lebed (1988–1991)

=== Post USSR Collapse ===
- Major-General Alexander Petrovich Kolmakov (1991–1993)
- Major-General Yevgeny Yuryevich Savilov (1993–2004)
- Major-General Andrey Nikolayevich Serdyukov (2004–2007)
- Major-General Yevgeny Ustinov (2007)
- Colonel Alexander Vyaznikov (2007–2010)
- Colonel Alexey Naumets (2010)
- Colonel Gennady Anashkin (2010–2011)
- Major-General Vladimir Kochetkov (2011–2013)
- Major-General Dmitry Glushenkov (2013–2015)
- Colonel/Major-General Pavel Kirsi (2015–2020)
- Colonel Evgeniy Nikolaevich Tonkikh (2020–2021)
- Major-General Vladimir Vyacheslavovich Selivyorstov (2021–2023)
- Major-General Alexander Nemolayev (2024)

== Gallery ==
106th Guards Airborne Division shoulder sleeve insignia (1993–2006)

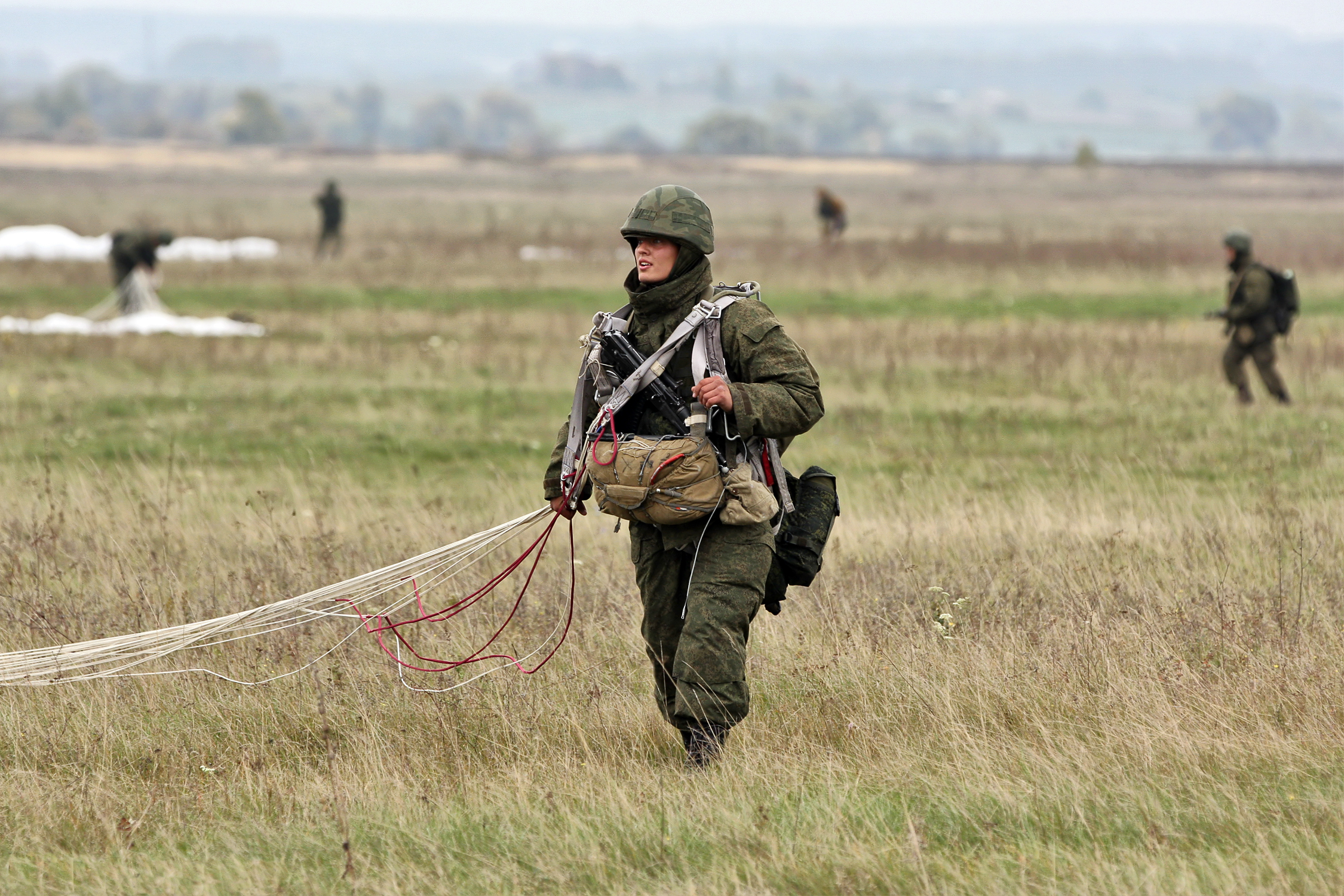
Paratrooper during a 2011 military exercise in Ryazan Oblast

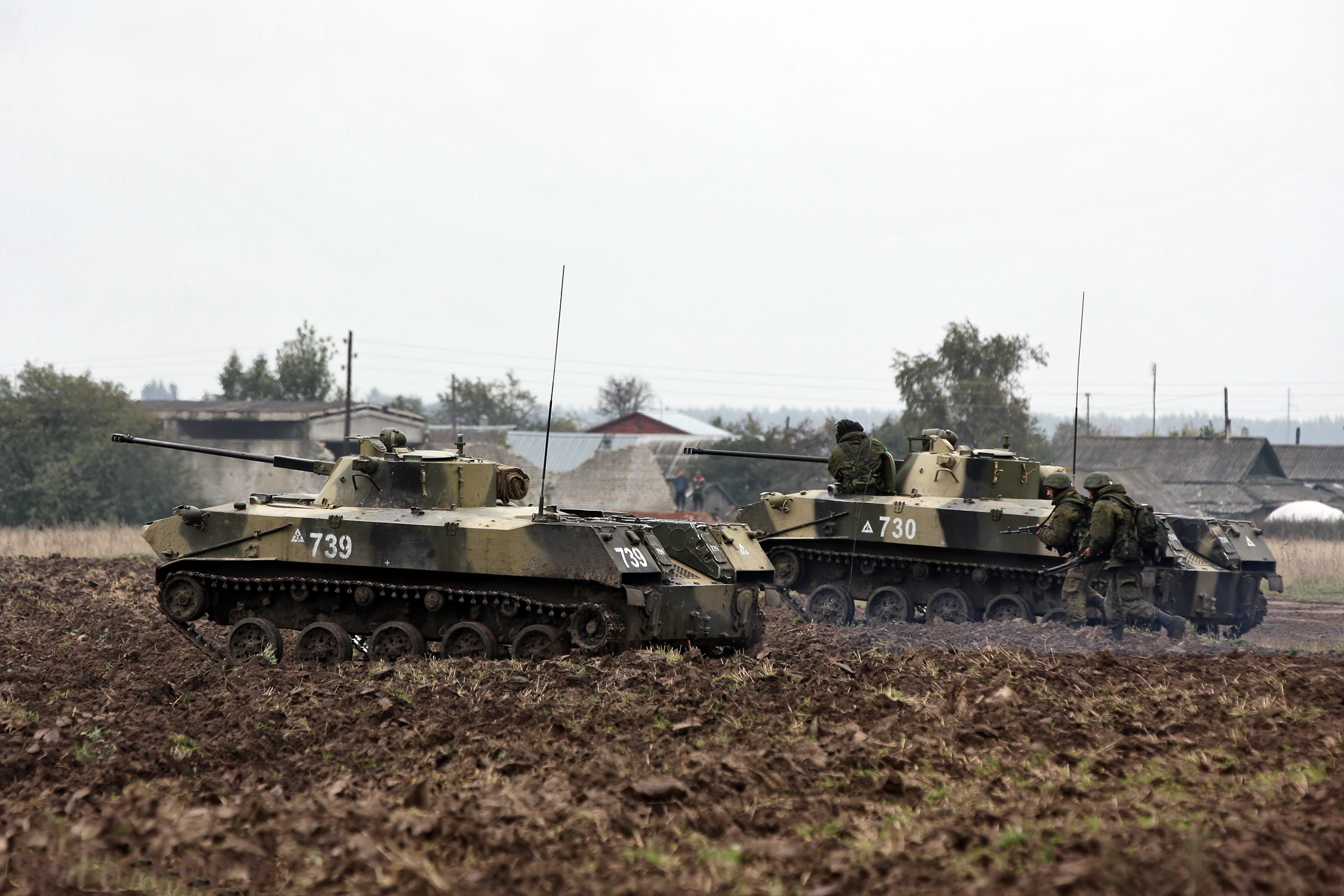
BMD-2s with paratroopers of the 106th Guards Airborne Division

== Sources ==
- Felshtinsky, Yuri; Pribylovsky, Vladimir (20 April 2008), The Age of Assassins. The Rise and Rise of Vladimir Putin, London: Gibson Square Books, ISBN 978-1-906142-07-0
