= 11th Guards Airborne Division =

- Active: I Formation: 1943–1944 II Formation: 1948–1955
- Country: Soviet Union
- Branch: Red Army; Soviet Airborne Troops
- Type: Infantry, airborne
- Size: Division
- Decorations: Order of the Red Banner (2nd formation)

The 11th Guards Airborne Division was the name of two separate airborne divisions of the Soviet Airborne Troops. The division was first formed in late 1943 from three airborne brigades and did not see action before its conversion to the 104th Guards Rifle Division nearly a year later. The division was formed a second time in 1948 from a regiment at Ryazan and was disbanded in 1955.

== History ==
=== First Formation ===
The 11th Guards Airborne Division was formed on 23 December 1943 from the 1st, 2nd, and 11th Guards Airborne Brigades, part of the Reserve of the Supreme High Command. The division included the 1st, 2nd, and 11th Guards Airborne Brigades. It was commanded by Major General Vasily Polikarpovich Ivanov. The division became part of the 38th Guards Airborne Corps when it was formed. On 8 December 1944, the State Defense Committee decided to reorganize the division as the 104th Guards Rifle Division. The reorganization took place at Slutsk.

=== Second Formation ===
The 347th Guards Air Landing Regiment had been converted from the 347th Guards Rifle Regiment in June 1946, and from 1946 to 1948 was based in Tula. It formed part of the 106th Guards Airborne Division.

On 15 October 1948, the 11th Guards Airborne Division was formed from the 347th Guards Air Landing Regiment. The new division was based at Ryazan and inherited the Order of the Red Banner from the regiment. It was part of the 38th Guards Airborne Corps. In 1948 the key divisional units included the 111th Guards Airborne Regiment; the 137th Guards Air Landing Regiment; (Note: Airlanding Regiments were glider-borne units.) the 1185th Guards Artillery Regiment (all at Ryazan, Moscow Oblast) and independent Self-Propelled Artillery, independent Guards Anti-Aircraft Artillery, independent Guards Anti-Tank Artillery; and independent Guards Engineering Battalions; and independent Guards Reconnaissance, independent Communications, and an independent Air-Landing Security Company. Combat service support units included an independent Supply Truck Battalion, and independent Medical & Sanitary Company. The 137th Guards Air Landing Regiment was later converted to the 137th Guards Airborne Regiment at some point, possibly as late as April 1955. The division was commanded by Vasily Larin from February 1949, and then Aleksandr Andreyevich Koreshchenko from 24 January 1953 to 5 April 1955. On 25 April 1955, the division was disbanded, with the 111th Guards Airborne Regiment transferred to the 105th Guards Vienna Airborne Division and the newly converted 137th Guards Airborne Regiment transferred to the 106th Guards Airborne Division.

== Composition ==
In 1948, the division was composed of the following units.

- 111th Guards Airborne Regiment
- 137th Guards Air Landing Regiment
- 1185th Guards Artillery Regiment

== Commanders ==
- General-mayor Vasily Larin (February 1949–24 January 1953)
- General-mayor Aleksandr Andreyevich Koreshchenko (24 January 1953–5 April 1955)
