= Peschanka, Ilovlinsky District, Volgograd Oblast =

Peschanka Песчанка
- Khutor
- Location within Volgograd Oblast Location within Russia
- Coordinates: 49°21′N 44°02′E
- Country: Russia
- Region: Volgograd Oblast
- District: Ilovlinsky District
- Time zone: UTC+4:00

Peschanka (Russian: Песчанка) is a rural locality (a khutor) in Ilovlinskoye Rural Settlement, Ilovlinsky District, Volgograd Oblast, Russia. The population was 542 as of 2010. There are 10 streets.

== Geography ==
Peschanka is located in steppe, on the left bank of the Ilovlya River, on the Volga Upland, 9 km northeast of Ilovlya (the district's administrative centre) by road. Avilov is the nearest rural locality.
