= Bagayevskaya =

Rural locality in Rostov Oblast, Russia

Coordinates: 47°19′30″N 40°22′40″E

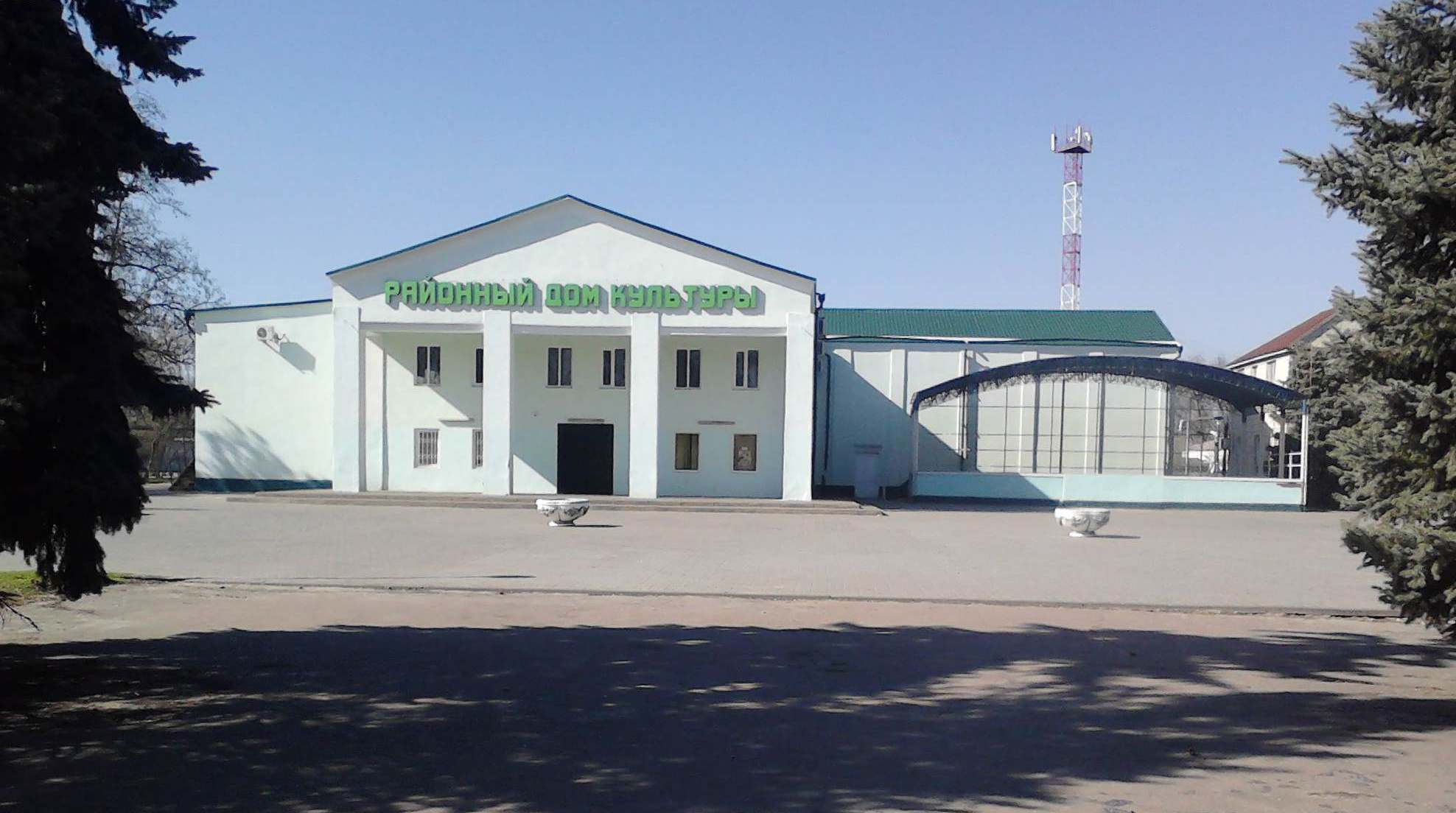
Palace of Culture

Bagayevskaya (Russian: Багаевская) is a rural locality (a stanitsa) and the administrative center of Bagayevsky District, Rostov Oblast, Russia. Population: 15,459 (2010 census); 15,275 (2002 census); 13,608 (1989 Soviet census).
