= 38th Guards Airborne Corps =

38th Guards Airborne Corps (1946–1955) 38th Guards Rifle Corps (1945–1946) 38th Guards Airborne Corps (1944–1945)
- Active: 1944–1955
- Country: Soviet Union
- Branch: Red Army; Soviet airborne
- Type: airborne, infantry
- Size: Corps
- Engagements: World War II: Vienna Offensive; Prague Offensive
- Battle honours: Vienna

Commanders
- Notable commanders: Alexander Kapitokhin; Alexander Utvenko

The 38th Guards Airborne Corps was an airborne corps of the Soviet airborne. It was activated during World War II in August 1944 and became a rifle corps in December of that year. The corps fought in the Vienna Offensive and the Prague Offensive during the spring of 1945. After the end of the war, it was converted back into an airborne corps. The corps served at Tula until its 1955 disbandment when the Soviet airborne was reorganized.

== History ==
=== World War II ===
The 38th Guards Airborne Corps was formed around 9 August 1944 under the command of Alexander Kapitokhin, part of the Separate Airborne Army. The corps included the 11th, 12th, and 16th Guards Airborne Divisions. On 8 December, the corps became a rifle corps and its divisions were soon converted into infantry divisions. At the same time, the Separate Airborne Army became the 9th Guards Army.

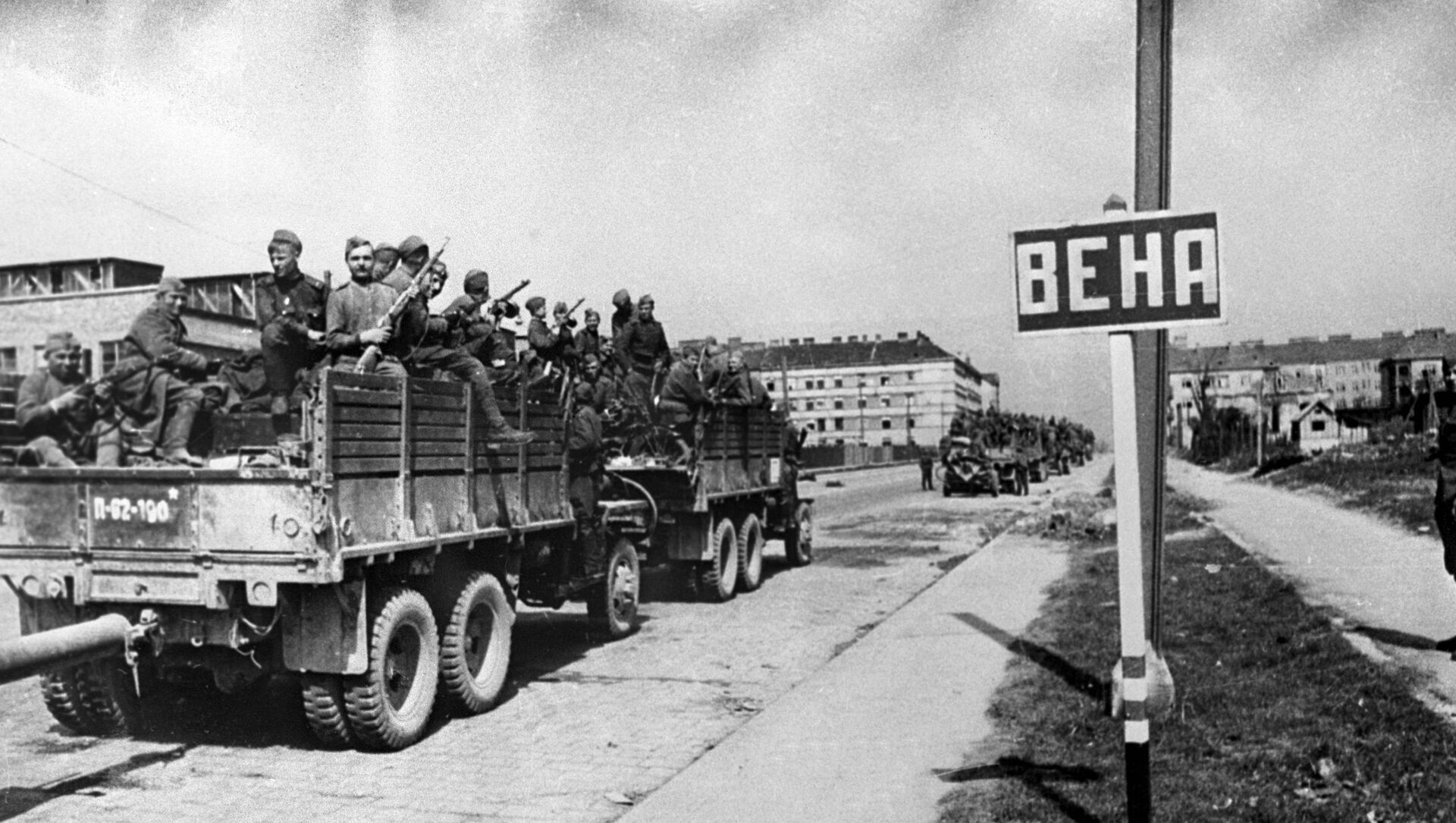
Soviet troops during the Vienna Offensive

In January 1945, the corps transferred to Hungary with the rest of the 9th Guards Army. The corps first fought in combat on 21 February. On 26 March, Kapitokhin was replaced by Alexander Utvenko in command. It fought during the Vienna Offensive, where its 104th Guards Rifle Division captured Sankt Pölten. Its 105th Guards Rifle Division blocked the Vienna-Linz road. For its actions in the Vienna Offensive, the corps was awarded the honorary title "Vienna". Advancing on the right flank of the 37th Guards Rifle Corps, the corps entered Czechoslovakia and fought in the Prague Offensive, where the 106th Guards Rifle Division captured Znojmo.

=== Postwar ===
The corps briefly became part of the Central Group of Forces before it was relocated to Ivanovo in the Moscow Military District in the summer of 1945. The 104th Division was based at Kostroma, and the 105th and 106th were at Teykovo. On 10 June, the corps was converted back into an airborne corps along with the rest of the corps of the 9th Guards Army, which became the headquarters of the Soviet airborne. Its divisions also became airborne divisions. The 689th Separate Communications Battalion was directly subordinated to corps headquarters around this time. The 104th Guards were transferred to the 15th Guards Airborne Corps in Estonia, and the 105th and 106th Divisions moved to Kostroma and Tula, respectively. The corps headquarters was moved to Tula. In July, Lieutenant General Stepan Povetkin became commander of the corps. Lieutenant General Erofey Dobrovolsky took command in August. He would command the corps for the rest of its existence. On 15 October 1948, the 11th Guards Airborne Division was activated from a regiment of the 106th Guards Airborne Division at Ryazan to form a third division in the corps. On 25 April 1955, as part of the reorganization of the Soviet airborne, the corps and its 11th Guards Airborne Division were disbanded. The 105th and 106th Divisions were directly subordinated to the headquarters of the Soviet airborne.

== Commanders ==
The corps was commanded by the following officers.

- Lieutenant general Alexander Kapitokhin (9 August 1944 – 25 March 1945)
- Lieutenant general Alexander Utvenko (26 March 1945 – July 1946)
- Lieutenant general Stepan Povetkin (July–August 1946)
- Lieutenant general Erofey Dobrovolskiy (August 1946 – 25 April 1955)

== Composition ==
The corps was composed of the following units in January 1945.

- 104th Guards Rifle Division
- 105th Guards Rifle Division
- 106th Guards Rifle Division
