= Stanki, Vladimir Oblast =

Stanki Станки
- Selo
- Location within Vladimir Oblast Location within Russia
- Coordinates: 56°17′N 41°59′E
- Country: Russia
- Region: Vladimir Oblast
- District: Vyaznikovsky District
- Time zone: UTC+3:00

A church in Stanki, Vyaznikovsky District, Vladimir Oblast

Stanki (Russian: Станки) is a rural locality (a selo) in Mstyora Urban Settlement, Vyaznikovsky District, Vladimir Oblast, Russia. The population was 518 as of 2010. There are 14 streets.

== Geography ==
Stanki is located 14 km northwest of Vyazniki (the district's administrative centre) by road. Stavrovo is the nearest rural locality.
