= Rossoshka =

Rossoshka Россошка
- Selo
- Location within Volgograd Oblast Location within Russia
- Coordinates: 48°49′N 44°08′E
- Country: Russia
- Region: Volgograd Oblast
- District: Gorodishchensky District
- Time zone: UTC+4:00

Rossoshka (Russian: Россошка) is a rural locality (a selo) in Rossoshenskoye Rural Settlement, Gorodishchensky District, Volgograd Oblast, Russia. The population was 319 as of 2010. There are 9 streets.

== Geography ==
Rossoshka is located in steppe, on the left bank of the Rossoshka River, 37 km west of Gorodishche (the district's administrative centre) by road. Zapadnovka is the nearest rural locality.
