= Bagayevsky District =

Bagayevsky District Багаевский район (Russian)
- District
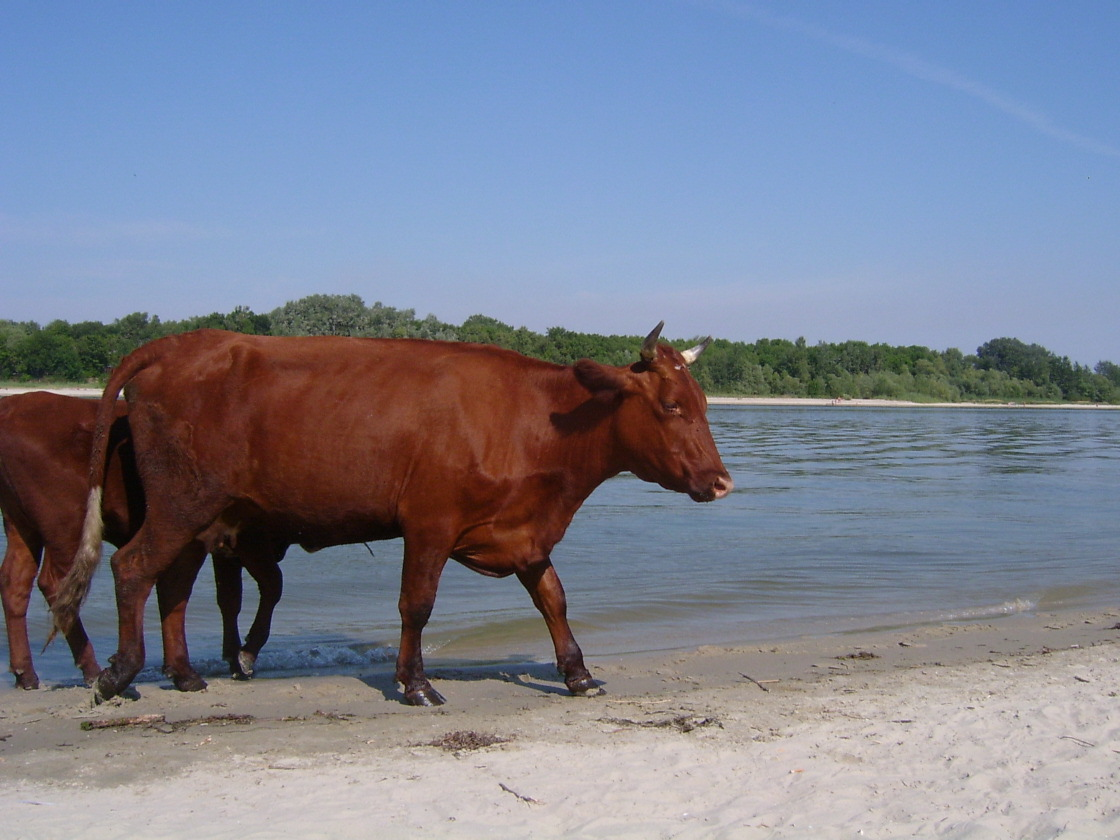
- Livestock in Bagayevsky District

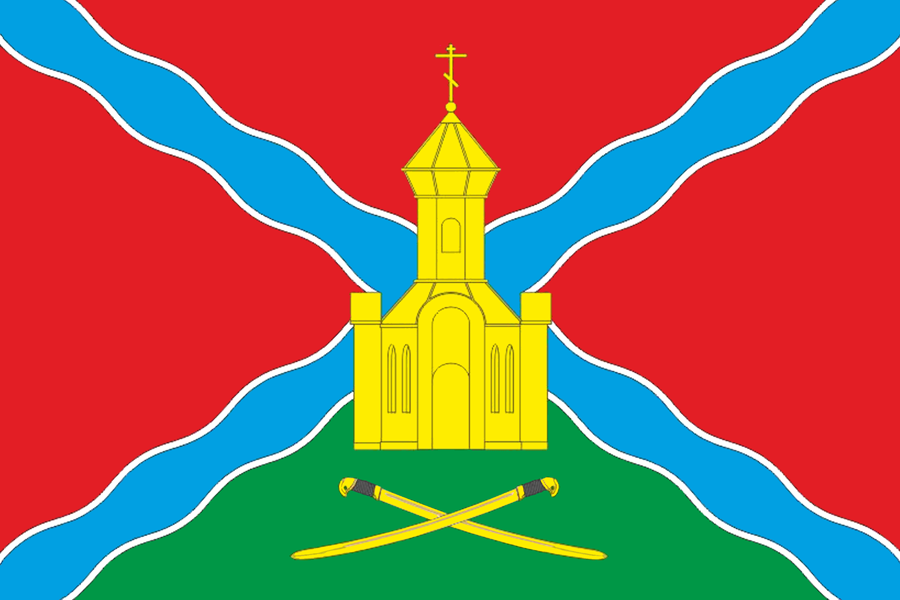
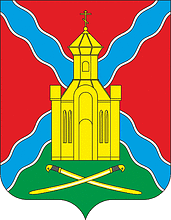
- Flag Coat of arms
- Location of Bagayevsky District in Rostov Oblast
- Coordinates: 47°19′N 40°23′E
- Country: Russia
- Federal subject: Rostov Oblast
- Established: 1924
- Administrative center: Bagayevskaya

Area
  - Total: 950.6 km^{2} (367.0 sq mi)

Population (2010 Census)
  - Total: 34,813
  - Density: 36.62/km^{2} (94.85/sq mi)
  - Urban: 0%
  - Rural: 100%

Administrative structure
  - Administrative divisions: 5 rural settlement
  - Inhabited localities: 25 rural localities

Municipal structure
  - Municipally incorporated as: Bagayevsky Municipal District
  - Municipal divisions: 0 urban settlements, 5 rural settlements
- Time zone: UTC+3 (MSK)
- OKTMO ID: 60605000
- Website: http://bagaev.donland.ru/

Bagayevsky District (Russian: Бага́евский райо́н) is an administrative and municipal district (raion), one of the forty-three in Rostov Oblast, Russia. It is located in the southwestern central part of the oblast. The area of the district is 950.6 square kilometers (367.0 sq mi). Its administrative center is the rural locality (a stanitsa) of Bagayevskaya. Population: 34,813 (2010 Census); 34,665 (2002 census); 32,298 (1989 Soviet census). The population of Bagayevskaya accounts for 44.4% of the district's total population.
