= 91st Guards Rifle Division =

- Active: 1943–1946
- Country: Soviet Union
- Branch: Red Army
- Type: Division
- Role: Infantry
- Engagements: Battle of Smolensk (1943); Polotsk-Vitebsk Offensive; Gorodok offensive Operation Bagration; Vitebsk–Orsha offensive Baltic offensive Operation Doppelkopf; Šiauliai offensive Memel offensive Goldap-Gumbinnen Operation; East Prussian offensive Battle of Königsberg; Samland offensive Soviet invasion of Manchuria
- Decorations: Order of Lenin; Order of the Red Banner; Order of Suvorov
- Battle honours: Dukhovshchina; Khingan

Commanders
- Notable commanders: Maj. Gen. Mikhail Ivanovich Ozimin; Col. Aleksandr Borisovich Rodionov; Maj. Gen. Vasilii Ivanovich Kozhanov

The 91st Guards Rifle Division was reformed as an elite infantry division of the Red Army in April 1943, based on the 2nd formation of the 257th Rifle Division, and served in that role until after the end of the Great Patriotic War. It ended the war in the far east of Asia following the Soviet invasion of Manchuria with a highly distinguished record.

The 257th had distinguished itself as part of 3rd Shock Army in the battle and siege of Velikiye Luki during the winter of 1942-43 and was redesignated as a result in April 1943. After rebuilding in the reserves of Kalinin Front as part of 2nd Guards Rifle Corps it was transferred to the 39th Army where it served for the duration of the war under various corps commands. During the late summer offensive around Smolensk it received its first battle honor and then fought through the autumn and the winter of 1943–44 in a series of grinding battles on the approaches to Vitebsk. During Operation Bagration in the summer it helped to finally secure the liberation of that city and was rewarded with the Order of the Red Banner. It then advanced into the Baltic states, winning a further distinction for its part in the battle for Kaunas, and in October crossed the Neman River into the northeastern part of East Prussia. When the offensive resumed in the first months of 1945 the 91st Guards took part in the battles for that German state and was decorated with the Order of Lenin in February, a rare award for a rifle division. Following the German surrender the 39th Army was moved by rail to the Transbaikal Military District in preparation for the invasion and occupation of Japanese-held Manchuria. When this campaign began in August the division made a successful crossing of the Khingan Mountains and was recognized with a second battle honor. Despite this fine record of service the 91st Guards was disbanded before the end of 1945.

== Formation ==
The 257th Rifle Division was officially redesignated as the 91st Guards Rifle Division on April 18; it would receive its Guards banner on May 16. Once the division completed its reorganization its order of battle was as follows:

- 275th Guards Rifle Regiment (from 943rd Rifle Regiment)
- 277th Guards Rifle Regiment (from 948th Rifle Regiment)
- 279th Guards Rifle Regiment (from 953rd Rifle Regiment)
- 195th Guards Artillery Regiment (from 793rd Artillery Regiment)
- 97th Guards Antitank Battalion
- 94th Guards Reconnaissance Company
- 106th Guards Sapper Battalion
- 175th Guards Signal Battalion (later 139th Guards Signal Company)
- 101st Guards Medical/Sanitation Battalion
- 97th Guards Chemical Defense (Anti-gas) Company
- 100th Guards Motor Transport Company
- 94th Guards Field Bakery
- 93rd Guards Divisional Veterinary Hospital
- 2216th Field Postal Station
- 609th Field Office of the State Bank

The division remained under the command of Maj. Gen. Mikhail Ivanovich Ozimin, who had commanded the 257th since March 11. At this time the 91st was a separate rifle division in 3rd Shock Army of Kalinin Front. By the beginning of June it had been moved to the 2nd Guards Rifle Corps in the Front reserves where it remained into July when it was assigned to 39th Army in the same Front. On August 7 the Corps, which also contained the 9th and 17th Guards Rifle Divisions, would come under command of Maj. Gen. A. P. Beloborodov.

== Into Western Russia ==
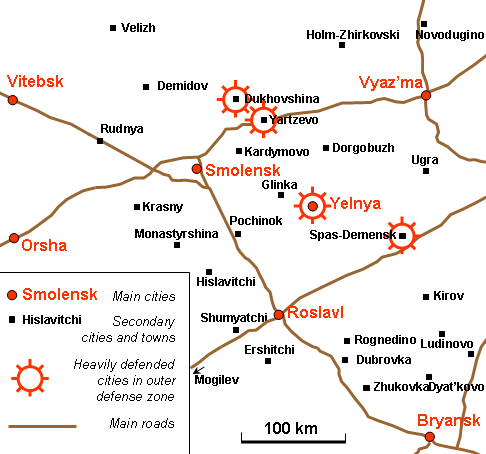
General layout of Smolensk region during the battle.

Western Front began its summer offensive on August 7 in the direction of Smolensk but made only limited progress of 15–25km against heavy German resistance by August 11. At 0730 hours on August 13 Kalinin Front joined the offensive from the north, attacking the XXVII Army Corps of German 4th Army north of Dukhovshchina. The Front's main effort was made by 39th Army on its left flank with five rifle divisions of 2nd Guards and 83rd Rifle Corps, supported by two tank brigades, two tank regiments, and two sapper brigades. The 43rd Army conducted a supporting attack on the right. The German corps had three infantry divisions defending a 40km-wide front with one in reserve but all were significantly under strength.

Kalinin Front only had enough ammunition to carry out a 35-minute artillery preparation, which failed to suppress the well-prepared German defenses. In the first few hours Beloborodov's divisions managed to penetrate the first trench line of the 52nd Infantry Division southeast of Spas-Ugly and overrun one German battalion but overall 39th Army was only able to advance about 1.5km before being stopped by counterattacks. Over the following three days the defenders received considerable air support, antitank assets and lead elements of the 25th Panzergrenadier Division which enabled them to stabilize their lines after losing only about 3km at a cost of over 3,000 casualties. A period of rain set in from August 15-20 which worsened the supply situation of the two Soviet fronts. On August 21 the commander of Western Front, Col. Gen. V. D. Sokolovskii, who was in overall command of the offensive, was authorized to suspend it for a week.

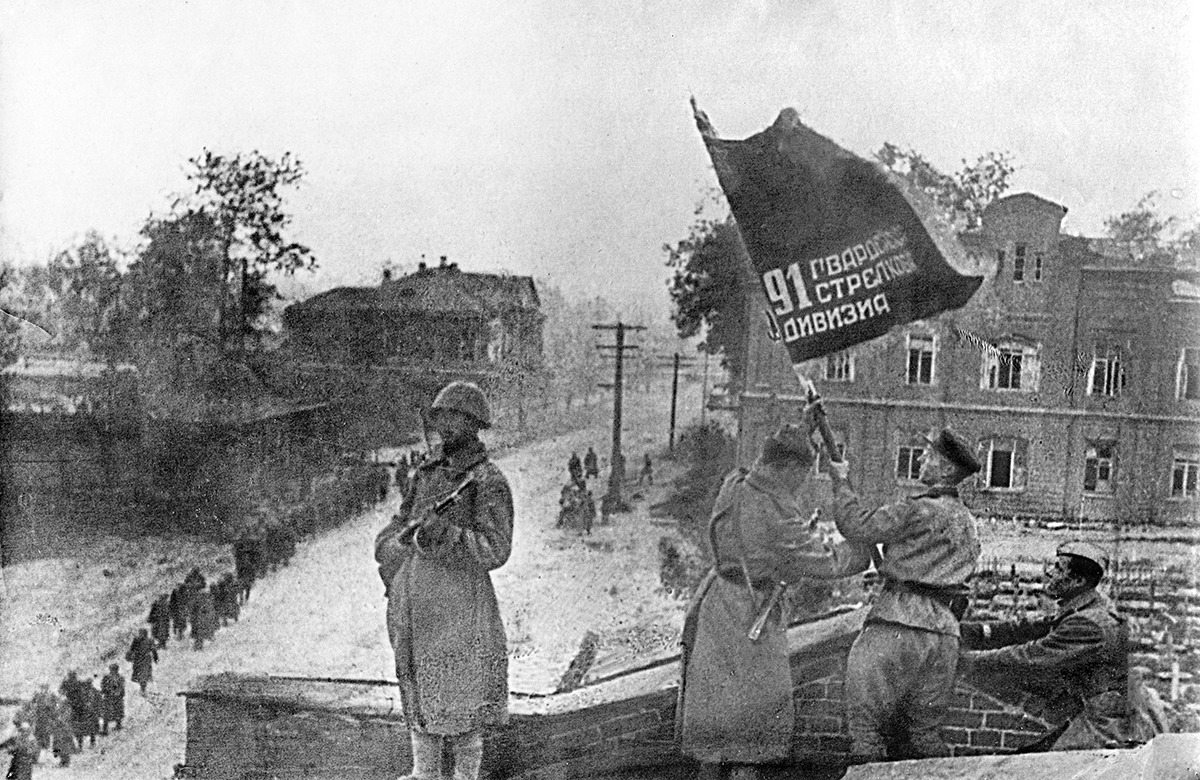
Officers of the 91st Guards Rifle Division raising the divisional Red Banner over liberated Dukhovshchina, 19 September 1943

It wasn't until September 14 that Kalinin Front was able to re-enter the fighting. Lt. Gen. N. E. Berzarin had by now taken over command of 39th Army. The XXVII Army Corps was spread thinly on a 81km sector with five divisions totalling about 10,000 front-line troops. After a 20-minute artillery preparation the 39th Army attacked the 52nd and 197th Infantry Divisions with four rifle divisions, smashing one German regiment and creating a breach in the front into which the Front's mobile forces were committed, causing the 52nd Division to collapse across a wide area. The next day the Army expanded its penetration as the German corps began falling back to the Hubertus Line. On the morning of September 16 the 2nd Guards Corps and the 84th Rifle Corps linked up at Klevtsi, 11km north of Dukhovshchina, although the 197th Infantry escaped the pincers. The 2nd Guards Corps with the Dremov Mobile Group pushed south, brushing aside German rearguards; the city was evacuated overnight and the 91st Guards was given its first honorific two days later:

DUKHOVSHCHINA – ...91st Guards Rifle Division (Maj. Gen. Ozimin, Mikhail Ivanovich)... The troops that participated in the liberation of Dukhovshchina, by order of the Supreme Commander-in-Chief of 19 September 1943 and a commendation in Moscow, are given a salute of 12 artillery salvoes of 124 guns."

== Battles for Vitebsk ==
General Ozimin left command of the division on September 24. He went on to lead two rifle corps, be promoted to the rank of lieutenant general, and was made a Hero of the Soviet Union before being killed in a traffic accident in 1946. Col. Veniamin Lvovich Beilin took over command the following day but he was in turn replaced by Lt. Col. Pyotr Grigorievich Karamushko on October 15. As of October 1 the 91st Guards was serving as a separate division in the 39th Army. Smolensk had finally been liberated on September 25 and following this the forces of Western Front and the left wing of Kalinin Front mounted an advance toward the border of Belarus, with the immediate objectives of Orsha and Vitebsk. 39th Army had its 84th Corps and 5th Guards Rifle Corps in the lead with the 91st Guards, 32nd Rifle Division and 124th Rifle Brigade in reserve, with orders to exploit success wherever it occurred. The Army faced the German VI Army Corps' 246th and 256th Infantry Divisions, defending a sector from east of Mikulino to south of Rudnya.

During the last days of September and early October 39th Army made considerable progress, taking Rudnya on September 29 and liberating Liozna on October 9 after a two-day struggle. This was followed by a vigorous advance before reaching a new German defensive line from west of Surazh to Janavičy to Babinavichy. At this point the 91st Guards was on the Army's right (north) flank linking up with the 306th Rifle Division of 43rd Army. Given the attrition caused by over nine days of heavy combat the commander of Kalinin Front, Army Gen. A. I. Yeryomenko, ordered a pause for regrouping before continuing the drive on Vitebsk. A postwar history of 39th Army written by Lt. Gen. V. R. Boiko states that the Army's Guards regiments were particularly depleted due to being "constantly deployed on the main axis." The Army resumed its attacks on October 15 but the first of these were only of a local nature. Three days later the 84th Corps, which now included the 91st Guards, began a more general effort westward along the Liozna road but this was halted on October 20 without achieving any notable success, and by the end of the month the front had stabilized. Kalinin Front had by now been redesignated as 2nd Baltic Front.

=== Polotsk-Vitebsk Offensive ===
The 1st and 2nd Baltic Fronts began new operations in early November; the objective for 1st Baltic was first to take Vitebsk and then to advance toward Polotsk. 39th and 43rd Armies were positioned primarily to the north of the Smolensk–Vitebsk railroad and highway against the defending VI Army Corps. When the assault began on November 8 the 39th Army had the 84th and the 5th Guards Corps deployed abreast, supported by a composite mobile corps made up of three mechanized and tank brigades under command of Col. I. F. Dremov. Despite the attacking forces being eroded to about half their authorized strengths they still enjoyed a fivefold superiority in infantry and an absolute superiority in armor and artillery. On the first day the 184th Rifle Division and 124th Rifle Brigade were repulsed by the 246th Infantry Division, but this was intended as a diversion. The next morning the Army's main forces attacked and ripped through the defenses of the 206th Infantry Division just north of the highway.

This joint assault on November 9 by the 39th and 43rd Armies breached the German line along a 10km-wide front and by evening the lead elements of the attacking force had reached Poddube, just 10km east of the defense lines around Vitebsk proper. The 206th Infantry's front was a shambles by nightfall and the 14th Infantry Division's right flank was both turned and wide open. While the 43rd Army's advance was largely contained at Poddube on November 11 the 39th managed to continue another 5km along the highway as far as Karamidy and the banks of the Losonina River, 10km east of Vitebsk. General Berzarin now committed the Dremov Group to combat which led to a complex battle with elements of the 18th Panzer Division and battlegroups of the 206th and 246th Infantry. By November 17 the German forces were able to restore a fairly continuous front and the Soviet assault expired in exhaustion.

=== Vitebsk (Gorodok) Offensive ===
On December 8 the STAVKA directed the new commander of 1st Baltic Front, Army Gen. I. K. Bagramyan, to go over to the defense so his armies could regroup and refit prior to another offensive to take Vitebsk as well as the town of Gorodok to the north. The forces of his Front, including the 91st Guards, were by now seriously under strength from near-continuous fighting since early October. The new offensive on Vitebsk would also involve the 33rd Army of Western Front and would begin on December 19. Lt. Col. Karamushko was reassigned as deputy commander of 9th Guards Rifle Division after Col. Aleksandr Borisovich Rodionov took over command of the division on December 15. During the month, as part of 39th Army's regrouping, the division was transferred to the 5th Guards Rifle Corps.

At the start of the offensive the combined forces of 43rd and 39th Armies struck the defenses of 14th Infantry Division. According to German records eight rifle divisions, one rifle brigade and two tank units participated in the initial assault on a 16km-wide sector from Borok northeast to Kasenki, south of the Vitebsk–Surazh road. General Berzarin had deployed his 5th Guards and 1st Rifle Corps, soon reinforced with 84th Corps and several separate formations, on the Borok–Goriane sector. The 91st Guards and 17th Guards were in the first echelon of 5th Guards Corps and had the 28th Guards Tank Brigade in support. Overall the two armies drove the defenders back up to 3km on an 8km-wide front by day's end on December 19 and almost reached the Vitebsk–Surazh road. The next day the second echelon divisions were committed to develop the attack; these gained another 2km in heavy fighting but were still unable to cross the road. The 14th Infantry committed all its reserves and was reinforced with one regiment of the 197th Infantry transferred from the Orsha sector. The battle raged until December 23 by which time the Soviet forces had reached the road on a 10km sector from Piatiletna to Kasenki. Prior to this Bezarin withdrew the 5th Guards Corps on December 21 and transferred it south to the Smolensk–Vitebsk road to reinforce an assault along that axis.

==== Third Vitebsk Offensive ====
By this time the 2nd Baltic Front was about to liberate Gorodok and the German position at Vitebsk was becoming pocketed on three sides. The STAVKA believed that the forces it had assembled were sufficient to pinch off the salient and take the city. Western Front's 33rd Army was heavily reinforced to lead the new effort with the 39th Army's 5th Guards and 84th Corps concentrated on and south of the Smolensk–Vitebsk highway; although the divisions of these Corps had been severely weakened in previous attacks they faced only a single regiment of the 206th Infantry. The assault began on December 23 and 91st Guards was initially deployed in the Corps' reserve. By December 26, 5th Guards Corps had advanced a mere 2–3km, leading to a caustic telegram from the STAVKA to the 1st Baltic Front, demanding greater progress. 91st Guards was now committed to the fighting but despite this 39th Army only managed to gain another 1–2km by December 28 before stalling completely, while 33rd Army soldiered on until January 6, 1944.

The offensive was renewed on January 8. 5th Guards Corps formed 39th Army's shock group on a 6km-wide between the Smolensk–Vitebsk road and the village of Vaskova, again facing the 206th Infantry Division. The 91st Guards was in the first echelon with 19th Guards and 9th Guards Rifle Divisions, backed by two tank brigades and with the 17th Guards in second echelon. By now these divisions were at less than 40 percent of authorized strength. Although the German forces were similarly weakened, 5th Guards Corps' attack floundered after an advance of only about 1000m. Although the 33rd and 5th Armies to the south made greater progress, it was at a heavy cost, and the offensive was finally shut down late in the month.

==== Fourth Vitebsk Offensive ====
In late January the 39th Army was transferred to Western Front. Severe winter weather and the need to replenish forces delayed further efforts to encircle Vitebsk until late February. By the last week of the month the 5th Guards Corps was deployed due east of the city in the Karamidy region, with the 17th and 19th Guards in the line facing the 246th Infantry and the 91st Guards in reserve. A renewed offensive was planned to begin on February 29 and in preparation the Corps was moved southward to face the 206th Infantry. Before it could begin the commander of the 3rd Panzer Army, Col. Gen. G.-H. Reinhardt, disrupted the plan by shortening his defensive line around the city. The STAVKA took this as a preliminary to a full withdrawal from the Vitebsk salient, and ordered a pursuit. This soon turned into yet another bloody frontal assault against fixed defenses. 91st Guards and the 262nd Rifle Division began their "pursuit" on both sides of the highway on March 1 but soon encountered stiff resistance. Berzarin committed the remainder of 39th Army but by March 5 it was clear that the operation was a failure, after gaining just several hundred metres (apart from the voluntary withdrawals) at heavy cost. This marked the end of major fighting on this sector until summer. Rodionov was known for his heavy drinking and 279th Guards Rifle Regiment commander Moisei Mdinaradze recalled that corps commander Ivan Bezugly was always trying to catch him drunk. On May 2 Colonel Rodionov was relieved due to his alcoholism and demoted to deputy commander of the 220th Rifle Division. His replacement, Colonel Vasily Kozhanov, arrived on the 16 May. This officer would be promoted to the rank of major general on May 5, 1945 and would lead the division for the duration of the war. He became a Hero of the Soviet Union on April 19 of that year.

== Operation Bagration ==
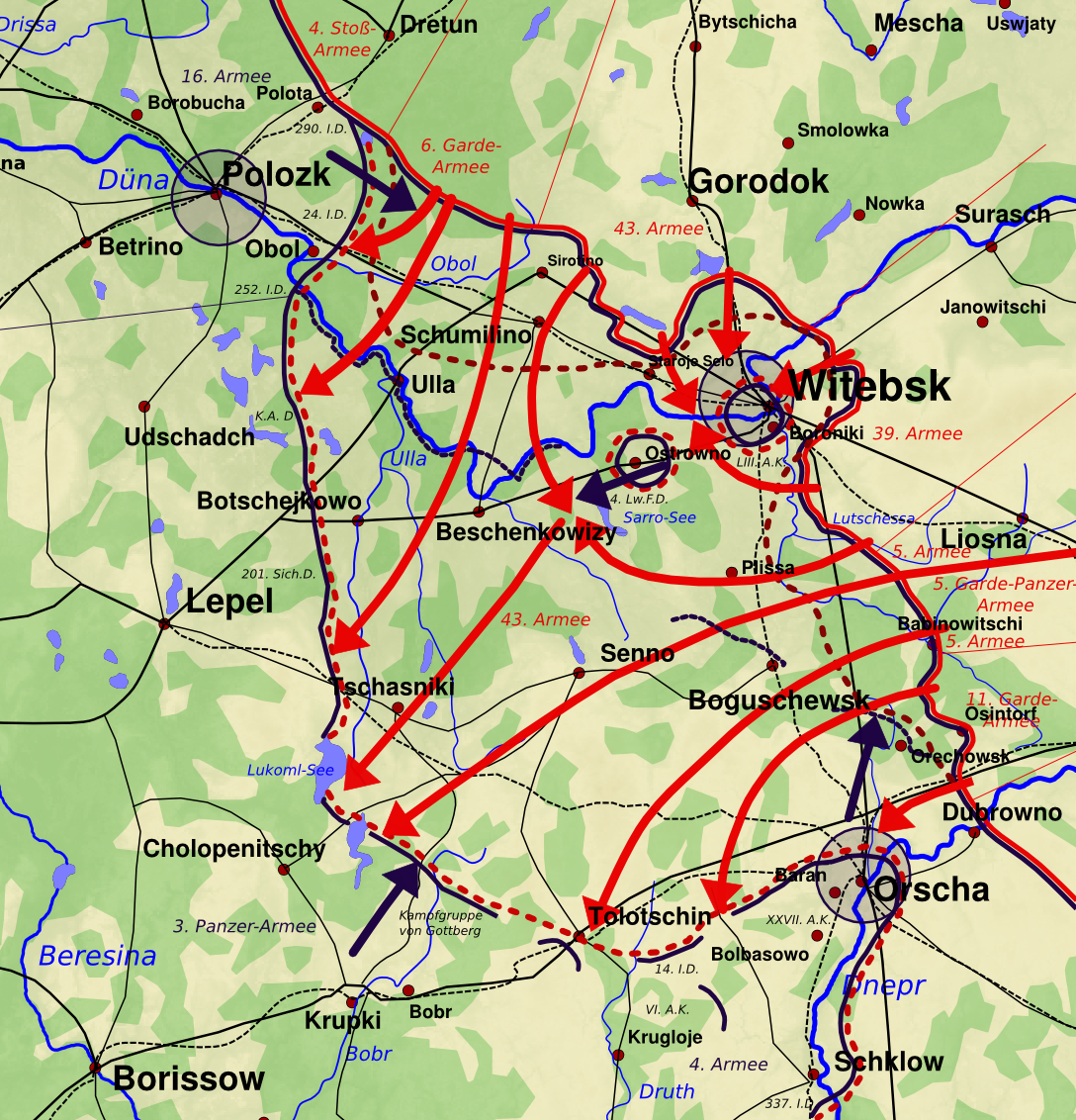
Vitebsk-Orsha Operation June 22-27. Note position of 39th Army east of the salient.

The 39th Army was still in Western Front as of the beginning of April but later that month the Front was disbanded and the Army was assigned to the new 3rd Belorussian Front. In the buildup for the Soviet summer offensive, 5th Guards Corps was still holding ground east and northeast of the salient, occupied by LIII Army Corps of 3rd Panzer Army, which was now closely enveloped and exceptionally exposed to encirclement after the fighting of the previous fall and winter. 39th Army was tasked with completing that envelopment from the south, with 5th Guards Corps assigned to a deep penetration action, facing the 197th Infantry of VI Army Corps. The Corps was supported by the 28th Guards Tank Brigade, plus the 735th and 957th Self-Propelled Gun Regiments (SU-76s). During the pause in operations the 91st Guards had been replenished to a strength of about 7,000 men. The new commander of 39th Army, Lt. Gen. I. I. Lyudnikov, decided to launch his main attack with the reinforced 5th Guards Corps (17th, 19th, 91st Guards and 251st Rifle Divisions), plus two divisions from the Army reserve, along the front from Makarova to Yazykovo in the general direction of Sharki, Zamostoche, Pesochna and Ostrovno and, after breaking through the German defense, prevent the LIII Corps from retreating. Upon completing the encirclement it was to destroy the German grouping in cooperation with 43rd Army, which was still in 1st Baltic Front.

The 197th Infantry at this time comprised survivors of two battered divisions that could not individually be brought up to strength due to a lack of replacements, but it was backed by most of the 281st Assault Gun Brigade. The offensive began on the afternoon of June 22 following a 2-hour-and-20-minute artillery and air bombardment and soon captured most of the advance positions of LIII and VI Army Corps. The second day began at 0600 hours with another hour of artillery preparation against the 197th Infantry, which allowed 5th Guards Corps to crash through its positions and begin advancing quickly to the west and southwest. The Corps soon reached the Luchesa River, being held on a 6km front by the 197th Division's 347th Infantry Regiment. By 0930 hours the river was crossed and a 60-tonne capacity bridge was soon installed, followed by 24-tonne and 9-tonne bridges as well. By 1300 all four divisions of the Corps were attacking on the front line and a battalion of the 28th Guards Tanks had been attached to the 91st Guards, which was on the right (north) flank. By 2300 the four divisions had advanced an additional 10km. A counterattack by a regiment of the 95th Infantry Division with armor support failed to slow the advance. Meanwhile the remnants of the 197th Infantry, having been driven toward Vitebsk, were transferred to LIII Corps. The German-held corridor to the city was now only 20km wide.

At 0600 hours on June 24 the 19th and 91st Guards Divisions broke through German VI Corps and continued driving west. The 91st Guards, now backed by the 735th SU Regiment, reached the Dvina River north of Ostrovno, while the 19th reached the same river at Gnesdilovichi, meeting the advance elements of 43rd Army, cutting the corridor to Vitebsk, and helping to encircle elements of the 197th Infantry and the 4th Luftwaffe Field Division at Ostrovno. 35,000 German troops were now trapped in the pocket and the VI Corps to its south was effectively broken. During June 25 the 19th Guards solidified its junction with 43rd Army as the German forces made frantic efforts to reopen the corridor which was being blocked, in part, by one rifle regiment of the 91st Guards. Hitler insisted that the division's old foe, 206th Infantry Division, remain in the city as long as possible. This turned out to be very short indeed, as Vitebsk was cleared during June 26 and 27, while the 17th and 91st Guards closed up to the Dvina, further dividing the IX Army Corps. The division still had one regiment north of Ostrovno but the remainder, with 17th Guards and the 28th Guards Tanks, attacked Vitebsk from the west. By noon on the second day Red Army troops had taken 7,000 prisoners with more coming in. Within hours 39th Army resumed marching westwards. By July 1 the 39th Army had returned to 1st Baltic Front, and on July 2 the division was awarded the Order of the Red Banner for its part in the liberation of Vitebsk.

=== Baltic Offensive ===
On July 4 the STAVKA issued a new directive in which 1st Baltic Front was ordered to develop the offensive by launching its main attack in the direction of Švenčionys and Kaunas with the immediate task of capturing a line from Daugavpils to Pabradė by no later than July 10-12. It was then to continue the attack with its main forces on Kaunas as well as toward Panevėžys and Šiauliai. 39th Army was out of contact with organized German forces as it caught up with the remainder of the Front and on this date the 5th Guards Corps was in the Kalnik–Domzheritsy–Zyaboenye area. By July 19 it had crossed the eastern border of Lithuania near Švenčionys. Two weeks later, as the rate of advance slowed due to logistics and increasing resistance, the 91st Guards was in the vicinity of Jonava, and 39th Army was returned to 3rd Belorussian Front. On August 12 the division was recognized for its role in the liberation of Kaunas with the award of the Order of Suvorov, 2nd Degree.

By about August 15, when Army Group Center tried to plug the "Baltic Gap" in Operation Doppelkopf, the division was on the east bank of the Neman River, at the confluence of the Dubysa River, and remained in this area through September and into October, dealing with the German counter-offensive and bringing up replacements and supplies. In recognition for their parts in defeating the German counterattack and then breaking through their defenses southwest of Šiauliai the 279th Guards Rifle Regiment was awarded the Order of the Red Banner, the 275th Guards Rifle Regiment received the Order of Suvorov, 3rd Degree, and the 277th Guards Rifle Regiment was presented with the Order of Kutuzov, 3rd Degree, all on October 31.

== East Prussian Offensives ==
Prior to these presentations the 39th Army played relatively minor roles in the initial stages of the Memel Operation as well as the Goldap-Gumbinnen Operation. On November 14 the 195th Guards Artillery Regiment received the Order of the Red Banner for its part in the fighting around Gumbinnen. Following this the front stabilized until January 1945 as the Red Army rebuilt its forces and restored its supply lines through the recently liberated territory.

In the plan for the Vistula-Oder Offensive, 39th Army was on the right flank of 3rd Belorussian Front, south of the Neman. 5th Guards Rifle Corps was in the Army's first echelon with 94th Rifle Corps, facing a breakthrough sector 8km wide, with the immediate objective of destroying the enemy forces in the Pilkallen area, before advancing westward and capturing Tilsit by the end of the fifth day. The offensive began on January 12 and made immediate progress. However, on the 14th the German forces launched heavy counterattacks along the front while the Soviet advance ran into deeply echeloned defenses. 39th Army beat off as many as 15 such attacks by up to a battalion in strength, backed by 8-16 tanks apiece. The 124th Rifle Division, committed from second echelon, broke into Pilkallen and seized the railroad station, the only significant advance of the day.

On January 17, 5th Guards Corps made a powerful attack in the center of its Army's front, broke through the Gumbinnen defense line, and by the end of the day had reached the line Kurschelen - Gross Schorellen - Spullen, having turned its main forces to the northeast. By this time it was clear that 39th Army was making the best progress among the armies of the Front, and the 1st Tank Corps was moved in to exploit. This Corps began its attack the following morning and made immediate progress; 5th Guards Corps advanced as much as 20km in its wake, captured Rautenburg, forced a crossing of the Inster River, and continued advancing to the northwest. This advance prepared the way for elements of 43rd Army to break into Tilsit in the afternoon of January 19. On January 22, 39th Army overall reached the Curonian Lagoon along the line of the Deime River, splitting the German defense. The defenders made use of prepared positions along this line to put up fierce resistance the following day, and it was not until 1900 hrs. that 5th Guards managed to force the river, gain a foothold on the west bank, and open the way to Königsberg.

The right-flank forces of 39th Army continued their pursuit on January 27, reaching the near approaches to the Königsberg fortress and became involved in stubborn fighting. General Lyudnikov wanted to isolate the city from the north as quickly as possible, and assigned his 5th Guards and 113th Rifle Corps the task of pursuing the German forces, reaching the Frisches Haff, and preventing them from withdrawing to the west. On February 9 the Army was transferred back to 1st Baltic Front, which was redesignated as the Zemland Group of Forces as of February 24. On February 19 the 91st Guards was awarded the Order of Lenin for its service in the capture of Tapiau, Allenburg, Nordenburg, and other towns in East Prussia. On the same date, for their roles in the taking of Tilsit, Skaisgirren, and other towns, the 275th Guards Regiment won the Order of the Red Banner while the 277th and 279th Guards Regiments each received the Order of Suvorov, 3rd Degree. Finally, after the battle for Königsberg and the German surrender the 103rd Guards Sapper Battalion was decorated with the Order of the Red Star on May 17.

== Soviet invasion of Manchuria ==
The division remained in Samland until late April, when it was removed, with its Army, to the Reserve of the Supreme High Command. By July 1 it was in the Transbaikal Military District (later Transbaikal Front), and remained there in early August when the Soviet offensive against the Japanese forces in Manchuria began. In the preparation for the invasion, 39th Army was in the easternmost tip of Mongolia, and was to help lead the Front as the western pincer of a strategic encirclement of the Kwantung Army. The Army had the 61st Tank Division as part of its forward detachment. The offensive was launched on the morning of August 9.

The attack began without artillery or air preparation, and no initial resistance was encountered on 39th Army's front. 5th Guards Rifle Corps advanced behind the 206th Tank Brigade south of the Halung-Arshaan and Wuchakou Fortified Regions, defended by two regiments of the Japanese 107th Infantry Division. The forward detachments gained 60km on this first day, but the rifle divisions were falling behind, so they formed new mobile detachments based on the supporting self-propelled artillery battalions. By this time 39th Army was advancing through the rugged Greater Khingan to cut the rail line at Solun and isolate the fortified regions. It was not until August 12 that 5th Guards Corps met any notable opposition when it ran into elements of the 107th Infantry attempting to withdraw by rail. These were dispersed and the road to Solun was reopened. That town was taken the next day. On August 14 the 17th and 91st Guards began the Soviet pursuit southeast along the railroad toward Wangyemiao; during this advance the 735th SU Regiment formed the basis of a new forward detachment for the Corps. The Red Army forces soon met further infantry and artillery of the 107th Infantry plus the 2nd Raiding Battalion at Tepossi. A battle that night and the following day scattered the Japanese units. The division remained in this area, guarding communications, until organized resistance ceased after August 18. In September the division was awarded its second battle honor, "Khingan".

Members of the division committed the notorious Gegenmiao massacre during the Manchuria Operation, torturing and killing thousands of Japanese civilians in August 1945.

== Postwar ==
The division ended the war with the full title of 91st Guards Rifle, Dukhovshchina-Khingan, Order of Lenin, Order of the Red Banner, Order of Suvorov Division. (Russian: 91-я гвардейская стрелковая Духовщинско-Хинганская ордена Ленина Краснознамённая ордена Суворова дивизия). With the 5th Guards Rifle Corps and the 39th Army, the division remained in China after the end of the war, based with the 17th Guards at Tzinchzhou.

In June 1946, the division was transformed into the 4th Guards Machine Gun Artillery Brigade, while the distinctions and honorifics of the 277th and 279th Regiments were passed to the 25th and 26th Guards Machine Gun Artillery Brigades. The 4th and 26th Brigades were disbanded in December 1946 while the 25th Brigade was renamed the 25th Guards Machine Gun Artillery Division.
