= 19th Guards Rifle Division =

19th Guards Rifle Division (March 17, 1942 – September, 1955)
- Active: 1942–1955
- Country: Soviet Union
- Branch: Red Army; Soviet Army (from 1946)
- Type: Division
- Role: Infantry
- Engagements: World War II; Siege of Leningrad; Lyuban Offensive Operation; Sinyavino Offensive; Battle for Velikiye Luki; Battle of Smolensk; Operation Bagration; Baltic Offensive; Battle of Memel; East Prussian Offensive; Battle of Königsberg; Samland Offensive; Invasion of Manchuria
- Decorations: Order of Lenin; Order of the Red Banner; Order of Suvorov
- Battle honours: Rudnya; Khingan

Commanders
- Notable commanders: Col. Semyon Ivanovich Bulanov; Maj. Gen. David Markovich Barinov; Maj. Gen. Ivan Prokofevich Repin; Maj. Gen. Boris Semyonovich Maslov; Maj. Gen. Pavel Nikolaievich Bibikov

The 19th Guards Rifle Division was formed from the first formation of the 366th Rifle Division on March 17, 1942. At this time it was in the 52nd Army of Volkhov Front, taking part in the Lyuban Offensive Operation, which was planned to encircle and defeat the enemy forces laying siege to Leningrad. However, just at that time the German 18th Army was in the process of cutting off the Soviet Lyuban grouping in a pocket, and over the following months the division was nearly destroyed. Enough survivors emerged from the swamps in June and July to rebuild the unit, and it fought in the Second Sinyavino Offensive before it was shifted south into Kalinin Front to take part in the battle and siege of Velikiye Luki in December. In the summer of 1943 the 19th Guards fought in the battles for Smolensk, and won its first battle honor, "Rudnya". in September. During the offensive in the summer of 1944 it was awarded the Order of the Red Banner for its successes in the fighting around Vitebsk. It was further honored in February, 1945, with the Order of Lenin for its role in the victories in East Prussia. In the summer the division was moved by rail with its 39th Army to the Far East and saw action in the Soviet invasion of Manchuria in August, winning its second battle honor, "Khingan", for its services. The division continued to see service well into the postwar era.

== Formation ==
The division was officially raised to Guards status on March 17, 1942, although its sub-units would not be redesignated for a month or more. Its basic order of battle would eventually be:

- 54th Guards Rifle Regiment (from 1218th Rifle Regiment)
- 56th Guards Rifle Regiment (from 1220th Rifle Regiment)
- 61st Guards Rifle Regiment (from 1222nd Rifle Regiment)
- 45th Guards Artillery Regiment (from 938th Artillery Regiment)

Col. Semyon Ivanovich Bulanov remained in command of the division, which was part of 52nd Army in Volkhov Front. This came just as the German 18th Army was in the process of cutting off and trapping parts of the 52nd and the 59th and all of 2nd Shock Army in the half-frozen wasteland south of Lyuban, and the division was already fighting for its existence. The encirclement was completed on March 20, but it was tenuous. On March 27 a gap was opened near the village of Miasnoi Bor, but it was only 3–5 km wide. The Red Army forces in the salient continued to operate under these circumstances through April and into May.

On May 12, Soviet intelligence indicated that 18th Army was about to attack again to cut the corridor. In light of this, orders came from the STAVKA to begin a phased withdrawal from the salient on May 14; when this proved impossible due to the depleted state of its forces, a full breakout and withdrawal was ordered on May 21. Colonel Bulanov was recorded as missing in action on July 25. During June and July, individual soldiers and small parties of men of the 19th Guards found their way out of the pocket through the thinly-held German lines. They were formed up with survivors of the 25th Cavalry Division to rebuild the division.

== Sinyavino and Velikiye Luki ==
Col. David Markovich Barinov was assigned to command of the division on July 26; he would be promoted to major general on November 27. The Soviet high command was anticipating a German summer offensive near Leningrad (which was in fact being planned) and intended to forestall it with an offensive of its own. This attack would break the siege by penetrating the land corridor east of the city between the Neva and Naziia rivers, south of the village of Sinyavino. The "bottleneck" was heavily defended and fortified, and much of the terrain was peat bogs. The rebuilt 19th Guards was allocated to the 6th Guards Rifle Corps with the 3rd and 24th Guards and 265th Rifle Divisions, which formed the shock group of the 8th Army of Volkhov Front.

The overall offensive began on August 19, with 55th Army attacking across the Neva from Leningrad. 8th Army began its attack at 0210 hrs on August 27, striking the junction of the German 227th and 223rd Infantry Divisions on a 15 km front with about a four-to-one advantage in manpower. On the first day, the 24th Guards and 265th Divisions broke the boundary and forced their way across the Chernaya River. Early the next day the 19th Guards exploited the breakthrough, advancing 5 to 6 km and reaching the southeastern approaches to Sinyavino by nightfall. This promising start was soon stymied as German reserves, including elements of 96th and 170th Infantry Divisions assembled at Sinyavino. On the 29th the Tiger tank made its inauspicious combat debut when four were committed south of Sinyavino Heights; two of them broke down almost immediately and a third had its engine overheat. By the 31st 6th Guards Corps had suffered such severe attrition against fierce and skillful German resistance that its penetration was contained. Over September 5–6, 19th and 24th Guards were withdrawn from the salient, although a General Staff report on September 15 stated that the first part of this withdrawal by the 19th was unauthorized.

As of October 1 the division was in 2nd Shock Army, but having been withdrawn it escaped the second encirclement and breakout of that Army in late September. By November 1 the rebuilding division had been moved south to the reserves of Kalinin Front in accordance with a directive from the STAVKA to that Front's commander, Lt. Gen. M. A. Purkaev, on October 13:

"... 2. In the Front's reserve in the Soblago region - the 8th Estonian Corps, consisting of the corps headquarters, the 7th and 249th Estonian Rifle Divisions and the 19th Guards Rifle Division. The corps is beginning to move following the 5th Guards Rifle Corps from the Yegorevska region and the 19th Guards Rifle Division from the Volkhov Front. This corps will not be employed without the STAVKA's permission."

At the beginning of December, as the battle for Velikiye Luki was underway, the 8th Corps was still in the reserves of Kalinin Front. Within two weeks it was subordinated to 3rd Shock Army and committed to the battle to reduce the encircled garrison of Velikiye Luki, but most of this fighting was done by the two Estonian divisions while 19th Guards was attached to 5th Guards Rifle Corps as of December 12, holding off the German attempts to relieve the garrison. 61st Guards Rifle Regiment was subordinated to 9th Guards Rifle Division, while the rest of the 19th formed a second echelon behind 5th Guards Corps. On December 18 General Barinov left command of the division; he was replaced by Col. Ivan Dmitrievich Vasilev. The next German relief attempt began on December 20. Following an artillery preparation, five German tanks accompanied by infantry were seen near the village of Pupkova and were engaged by the 54th Guards Rifle Regiment and attached antitank guns, driving them back with the loss of one tank, but this was a diversion. By noon the main German attack had captured the village of Gromovo and was threatening the junction of two regiments of 9th Guards, so Maj. Gen. A. F. Beloborodov, commander of 5th Guards Corps, ordered the main forces of the 19th to back them up. By 1500 hrs. the junction had been forced, and the 61st Regiment, with the 6th Guards Machine Gun Battalion, was forced to hold the gap. By 1700 hrs. night was falling, and the division was able to report to General Beloborodov that: "The attacks are repulsed. The enemy has not advanced a single step."

The German relief attempt was renewed on December 23 in the area around Pupkova. By the end of the day the gunners of the 19th, assisted by two ski brigades and the 36th Tank Brigade, had knocked out 17 panzers and driven the Germans back to their start line. On January 3, 1943, just before the next relief effort, the tip of the wedge driven by the German forces towards the city was defended in the first echelon by the 54th Guards Regiment and the 1193rd Regiment of the 360th Rifle Division, backed by that division's 1195th Regiment. A lapse in Soviet intelligence had failed to reveal newly-arrived enemy forces, which began another offensive on January 4. During this attack the 19th Guards held the perimeter of the wedge-shaped relief corridor from the west and northwest. The offensive made almost no gains after the 5th, and by the 12th had collapsed in exhaustion just 3 km from the western outskirts of Velikiye Luki. The remnants of the garrison surrendered on January 17.

== Into Belarus ==
On January 27 Colonel Vasilev handed his command over to Col. Dmitrii Tikhonovich Zhukov, but that officer in turn was replaced on January 31 by Maj. Gen. Ivan Prokofevich Repin. By February 1, 8th Corps had been withdrawn into reserve, and the division remained in 3rd Shock Army directly under Army command. Later that month it was finally subordinated to 5th Guards Rifle Corps, where it would remain until July. During these months the Corps gradually advanced westward in the direction of Novosokolniki, which involved a seesaw battle over several weeks for a German stronghold on the Ptahinski Hill, which finally ended on July 6. On July 8 General Repin handed command to Col. Konstantin Mikhailovich Vyazemskii, but he was in turn replaced less than a week later by Maj. Gen. Boris Semyonovich Maslov.

During August the 5th Guards Corps, now with the 17th and 19th Guards Rifle Divisions, was transferred to the 39th Army, still in Kalinin Front. The division would remain in this Corps and this Army for the duration of the war and into the postwar, sharing its combat path with the 17th Guards. Following the liberation of Smolensk in September, Kalinin Front launched an offensive in the direction of Vitebsk. This began with an assault on the German positions at Rudnya, led by the 1st Penal Battalion and a mobile group from 43rd Army and followed by three divisions of 5th Guards Corps. The town was liberated on September 29 and the 19th Guards won its first battle honor:

"RUDNYA - ...19th Guards Rifle Division (Maj. Gen. Maslov, Boris Semyonovich)... By order of the Supreme High Command the 19th Guards Rifle Division is granted this name."

In early November, Army Gen. A. I. Yeryomenko, commander of the recently renamed 1st Baltic Front, ordered the 43rd and 39th Armies to concentrate north of the Smolensk - Vitebsk railroad and highway in order to renew the advance on the latter city, which had slowed significantly over the past weeks. The assault was to open on November 8 against the positions of the German 206th and 14th Infantry Divisions. Although the divisions of the two Soviet armies were worn down to about half strength from earlier fighting, they still held a five-fold advantage in infantry, as well as superiority in armor and artillery. The offensive, in which the 19th Guards had a follow-on role, began as planned and opened a gap on a 10 km front by the next day, and gained as much as 10 km in depth over 10 days of fighting, before the German forces were able to rebuild a continuous front. On December 5, General Maslov handed command of the division over to Col. Feoktist Dannilovich Maiboroda, but this proved temporary as Maslov returned to command on December 28.

During these command changes, 39th Army, this time with 5th Guards Corps in the lead, began another joint offensive with 43rd Army on December 19, again striking the defenses of 14th Infantry east of Vitebsk, on the Borok - Goriane sector, backed by nearly 100 tanks. The attack made very limited gains, and 5th Guards Corps was withdrawn and sent south of the Smolensk - Vyasma road on December 21, with the entire offensive shut down two days later. This redeployment was made in order to reinforce a new assault by 33rd Army on this sector, which began on December 23. 19th Guards was deployed immediately south of the Smolensk - Vitebsk railroad, with the immediate objective of the village of Ugliane, although the overall goal of the offensive was to link up with 4th Shock Army and encircle the German forces in Vitebsk. By December 26, 5th Guards Corps had advanced a mere 2–3 km, leading to a caustic telegram from the STAVKA to the 1st Baltic Front, demanding greater progress. Despite this, 39th Army only managed to gain another 1–2 km by December 28 before stalling completely, while 33rd Army soldiered on until January 6, 1944.

The offensive was renewed on January 8. 5th Guards Corps formed 39th Army's shock group on a 6 km-wide between the Smolensk - Vitebsk road and the village of Vaskova, facing the 206th Infantry Division. The division was in the first echelon, with 9th and 91st Guards Rifle Divisions, backed by two tank brigades and the 17th Guards in second echelon. By now these divisions were at less than 40 percent of authorized strength. Although the German forces were similarly weakened, 5th Guards Corps' attack floundered after an advance of only about 1 km. Although 33rd and 5th Armies to the south made greater progress, it was at a heavy cost, and the offensive was finally shut down late in the month. General Maslov left command of the division on January 19, and was replaced by Col. Samuil Ilich Tzukarev.

Through the rest of January and most of February 5 Guards Corps was in reserve in 39th Army, which had been reassigned to Western Front. Near the end of the month it was ordered the Karamidy region astride the familiar Smolensk - Vitebsk road. A new offensive began on February 29, but just prior to its start the German command withdrew several units east of Vitebsk, including the 206th Infantry, back to shorter and more defensible lines. The STAVKA took this as a preliminary to a full withdrawal from the Vitebsk salient, and ordered a pursuit. This soon turned into yet another bloody frontal assault against fixed defenses. 19th Guards was committed on March 5, but by then it was clear that the operation was a failure, after gaining just several hundred metres (apart from the voluntary withdrawals) at heavy cost. This marked the end of major fighting on this sector until summer. The day after, Colonel Tzukarev left command of the division; he was succeeded over the next 12 days by two other colonels, until Col. Pavel Nikonovich Bibikov took command on March 18. This officer would be promoted to major general's rank on April 20, 1945, and would remain in command for the duration of the war.

=== Operation Bagration ===
On April 24 Western Front was disbanded, and 39th Army was reassigned to the new 3rd Belorussian Front. In the buildup for the Soviet summer offensive, 5th Guards Rifle Corps was still holding ground east and northeast of the Vitebsk salient, occupied by LIII Army Corps of 3rd Panzer Army, which was now closely enveloped on three sides and exceptionally exposed to encirclement after the fighting of the previous fall and winter. 39th Army was tasked with completing that envelopment from the south, with 5th Guards Corps assigned to a deep penetration action, facing the 197th Infantry Division of VI Army Corps. The Corps was supported by the 28th Guards Tank Brigade, plus the 735th and 957th Self-Propelled Gun Regiments (SU-76s). The offensive began on the afternoon of June 22, preceded by a 2-hour-and-20-minute combined artillery and air bombardment. After a successful initial advance, the second day began at 0600 hrs. with another hour of artillery preparation against the 197th Infantry, which allowed 5th Guards Corps to crash through its positions and begin advancing quickly to the west and southwest.

The Corps soon reached the Luchesa River, being held on a 6 km front by the 197th Division's 347th Infantry Regiment. By 0930 hrs. the river was crossed and a 60-tonne capacity bridge was soon installed, followed by 24-tonne and 9-tonne bridges as well. At this point 19th Guards came out of second echelon, crossed the Luchesa with the 28th Guards Tank Brigade and 735th SU Regiment, and began racing westward against light opposition. By 1300 hrs. all four divisions of 5th Guards Corps were attacking on the front line, and by 10 hours later had advanced up to 10 km from the river. A counterattack by a regiment of 95th Infantry Division, supported by tanks, failed to slow the Soviet advance, and the remainder of the 197th was driven back to join LIII Corps within the salient. At 0600 hrs. on June 24 the 19th and 91st Guards Divisions broke through German VI Corps and continued driving west. 91st Guards reached the Dvina River north of Ostrovno, while the 19th reached the same river at Gnesdilovichi, meeting the advance elements of 43rd Army of 1st Baltic Front, cutting the corridor to Vitebsk, and helping to encircle elements of the 197th Infantry and the 4th Luftwaffe Field Division at Ostrovno. 35,000 German troops were now trapped in Vitebsk.

During June 25 the division solidified its junction with 43rd Army as the German forces made frantic efforts to reopen the corridor. Hitler insisted that the 19th Guards' old foe, 206th Infantry Division, remain in the city as long as possible. This turned out to be very short indeed, as Vitebsk was cleared during June 26 and 27, while 19th Guards helped mop up the pocket at Ostrovno before marching westwards again. By July 1 the 39th Army had returned to 1st Baltic Front, and on July 2 the division was awarded the Order of the Red Banner for its part in the liberation of Vitebsk.

== Baltic States and East Prussia ==
In the aftermath of Bagration, 1st Baltic Front began a pursuit operation into the Baltic states. By July 19 it had crossed the eastern border of Lithuania near Švenčionys. Two weeks later, as the rate of advance slowed due to logistics and increasing resistance, 19th Guards was in the vicinity of Jonava, and 39th Army was returned to 3rd Belorussian Front. On August 12 the division was recognized for its role in the liberation of Kaunas with the award of the Order of Suvorov, 2nd Degree. By about August 15, when Army Group Center tried to plug the "Baltic Gap" in Operation Doppelkopf, the division was on the east bank of the Neman River, at the confluence of the Dubysa River, and remained in this area through September and into October, dealing with the German counter-offensive and bringing up replacements and supplies.

In the plan for the Vistula-Oder Offensive, 39th Army was on the right flank of 3rd Belorussian Front, south of the Neman. 5th Guards Rifle Corps was in the first echelon with 94th Rifle Corps, facing a breakthrough sector 8 km wide, with the immediate objective of destroying the enemy forces in the Pilkallen area, before advancing westward and capturing Tilsit by the end of the fifth day. The offensive began on January 12, 1945, and made immediate progress. However, on the 14th the Germans launched heavy counterattacks along the front while the Soviet advance ran into deeply echeloned defenses. 39th Army beat off as many as 15 such attacks by up to a battalion in strength, backed by 8-16 tanks apiece. The 124th Rifle Division, committed from second echelon, broke into Pilkallen and seized the railroad station, the only significant advance of the day.

On January 17, 5th Guards Corps made a powerful attack in the center of its Army's front, broke through the Gumbinnen defense line, and by the end of the day had reached the line Kurschelen - Gross Schorellen - Spullen, having turned its main forces to the northeast. By this time it was clear that 39th Army was making the best progress among the armies of the Front, and the 1st Tank Corps was moved in to exploit. This Corps began its attack the following morning and made immediate progress; 5th Guards Corps advanced as much as 20 km in its wake, captured Rautenburg, forced a crossing of the Inster River, and continued advancing to the northwest. This advance prepared the way for elements of 43rd Army to break into Tilsit in the afternoon of January 19. On January 22, 39th Army overall reached the Curonian Lagoon along the line of the Deime River, splitting the German defense. The defenders made use of prepared positions along this line to put up fierce resistance the following day, and it was not until 1900 hrs. that 5th Guards managed to force the river, gain a foothold on the west bank, and open the way to Königsberg.

The right-flank forces of 39th Army continued their pursuit on January 27, reaching the near approaches to the Königsberg fortress and became involved in stubborn fighting. The Army commander, Lt. Gen. I. I. Liudnikov, wanted to isolate the city from the north as quickly as possible, and assigned his 5th Guards and 113th Rifle Corps the task pursuing the enemy, reaching the Frisches Haff, and preventing the enemy from withdrawing to the west. In February, 39th Army was assigned to the Zemland Group of Forces in 3rd Belorussian Front, and on February 19 the 19th Guards was awarded the Order of Lenin for its service in the capture of Tapiau, Allenburg, Nordenburg, and other towns in East Prussia.

== Soviet invasion of Manchuria ==
The division remained in Samland until late April, when it was removed, with its Army, to the Reserve of the Supreme High Command. By July 1 it was in Transbaikal Front, and remained there in early August when the Soviet offensive against the Japanese forces in Manchuria began. In the preparation for the invasion, 39th Army was in the easternmost tip of Mongolia, and was to help lead the Front as the western pincer of a strategic encirclement of the Kwantung Army. The Army had the 61st Tank Division as part of its forward detachment. The offensive was launched on the morning of August 9.

The attack began without artillery or air preparation, and no initial resistance was encountered on 39th Army's front. 5th Guards Rifle Corps advanced behind the 206th Tank Brigade south of the Halung-Arshaan and Wuchakou Fortified Regions, defended by two regiments of the Japanese 107th Infantry Division. The forward detachments gained 60 km on this first day, but the rifle divisions were falling behind, so they formed new mobile detachments based on the supporting self-propelled artillery battalions. By this time 39th Army was advancing through the rugged Greater Khingan to cut the rail line at Solun and isolate the fortified regions. It was not until August 12 that 5th Guards Corps met any notable opposition when it ran into elements of the 107th Infantry attempting to withdraw by rail. These were dispersed and the road to Solun was reopened. That town was taken the next day. On August 14 the 19th Guards advanced along the railroad west of Solun against Japanese units retreating from Wuchakou which were also being pressured by 124th Rifle Division moving eastwards. The division remained in this area, guarding communications, until organized resistance ceased after August 18. In September the division was awarded its second battle honor, "Khingan".

Members of the division committed the notorious Gegenmiao massacre during the Manchuria Operation, torturing and killing thousands of Japanese civilians in August 1945.

== Postwar ==
The division ended the war with the full title of 19th Guards Rifle, Rudnya-Khingan, Order of Lenin, Order of the Red Banner, Order of Suvorov Division (Russian: 19-я гвардейская стрелковая Рудненско-Хинганская ордена Ленина Краснознамённая ордена Суворова дивизия). With the 5th Guards Rifle Corps and the 39th Army, the division remained in China after the end of the war, based at Antung. The division continued to serve with the 39th Army of the Far Eastern Military District at Port Arthur postwar. By 1953 it was directly subordinated to the Army headquarters. It was disbanded in September, 1955, as the Army withdrew from China.
