= Pyotr Karamushko =

Pyotr Grigoryevich Karamushko
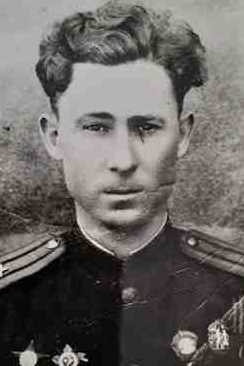
- Karamushko c. 1945
- Native name: Пётр Григорьевич Карамушко
- Born: August 24, 1908; Valki, Kharkov Governorate, Russian Empire
- Died: November 1998 (aged 90)
- Allegiance: Soviet Union
- Branch: Red Army
- Service years: 1930–1946
- Rank: Colonel
- Commands: 91st Guards Rifle Division
- Conflicts: Winter War; World War II
- Awards: Order of Lenin

Pyotr Grigoryevich Karamushko (Note: Russian: Пётр Григорьевич Карамушко, romanized: Pyotr Grigoryevich Karamushko; Ukrainian: Петро Григорович Карамушко, romanized: Petro Hryhorovych Karamushko) (24 August 1908 – November 1998) was a Red Army colonel who held division command during World War II.

== Early life and prewar service ==
A Ukrainian, Pyotr Grigoryevich Karamushko was born on 24 August 1908 in the city of Valki, Kharkov Governorate. In September 1930, he began his service as a cadet at the Kharkov Red Commanders Military School, and upon his graduation in December 1931 was appointed a platoon commander in the regimental school of the 69th Rifle Regiment of the 23rd Rifle Division of the Ukrainian Military District at Kharkov. From April to October 1932 he trained at the Pilot and Observer School in Chkalov, then was appointed assistant commander of the machine gun company of the 2nd Rifle Regiment of the 71st Rifle Division of the Volga Military District at Kazan. In December 1934 the division was transferred to the Siberian Military District, where Karamushko was appointed commander of the machine gun company of the 212th Rifle Regiment at Leninsk-Kuznetsky.

From October 1936 he served as assistant chief of the regimental school of the regiment, and in May 1938 became commander of the training battalion of the 211th Rifle Regiment of the division at Kemerovo. For "success in combat and political training" he was awarded the Order of the Badge of Honor on 22 February 1938. In September 1939 Karamushko was transferred to the 119th Rifle Division at Krasnoyarsk to command the 143rd Separate Reconnaissance Battalion. In January 1940 he was sent to the Northwestern Front with the division and fought in the Winter War. After the end of the war, the 119th returned to the Siberian Military District.

== World War II ==
After Operation Barbarossa began, the division was sent to the front on 30 June 1941 and on 9 July arrived at the Sychyovka station. It joined the 30th Army on 14 July and transferred to the 31st Army on 20 July. The division defended positions on the line from Khlebniki to Aleksin. Then-Major Karamushko became deputy commander of the 634th Rifle Regiment of the division in October, during which it fought in fierce fighting on the defensive line, then as part of the 29th Army retreated towards Rzhev and Kalinin when threatened with encirclement. On 13 November, Karamushko was appointed commander of the 920th Rifle Regiment of the division, holding defenses on the left bank of the Volga on the line from Chapayevka and on the left bank of the Tyma west of Kalinin as part of the 31st Army.

Two weeks later, he was transferred to command the 421st Rifle Regiment of the division. During the Kalinin offensive from 5 December 1941 the division as part of the shock group of the 31st Army went on the offensive in the area east of Kalinin in the sector of Poddubye and Gorokhovo, breaking through German lines on the right bank of the Volga and by 7 January 1942 reached the line of Stolpino, Shishkovo, and Kolodkino, where it went on the defensive. From 16 to 22 January the division marched to join the 22nd Army. By 26 January the 119th advanced on Bely and fought in the capture of the town on 29 January. In recognition of its actions, the division was converted into the 17th Guards Rifle Division on 17 March and the 421st became the 45th Guards Rifle Regiment. Subsequently, as part of the Group of Forces of Major General Vladimir Kolpakchi of the Kalinin Front and later the 41st Army, the division fought in the area of Bely. The German troops went on the offensive on 2 July from two directions in the area of Bely and Karskaya towards Nesterovo, cutting off the 39th Army and elements of the 41st Army. The 17th Guards were attacked by up to two German infantry regiments and 60 tanks. On the next day, Karamushko was severely wounded and evacuated to a hospital in Gorky.

After recovering, Karamushko was in the reserve of the Main Personnel Directorate from 5 October while awaiting assignment and in November was sent to study at the Frunze Military Academy. In June 1943, after graduating from an accelerated course there, he was seconded to the Vystrel course. In September he was sent back to the Kalinin Front for service as a regimental commander and upon his arrival there on 8 October became acting deputy commander of the 134th Rifle Division. On 18 October he became acting commander of the 91st Guards Rifle Division, which he led as part of the 5th Guards Rifle Corps in heavy fighting in the Vitebsk sector. After the appointment of Colonel Aleksandr Borisovich Rodionov to command the division, Karamushko was transferred to serve as deputy commander of the 9th Guards Rifle Division on 20 December. In 1944 Karamushko was promoted to colonel. He was hospitalized due to illness between 4 February and August of that year before returning to his position with the 9th Guards, fighting in the Baltic offensive as part of the 6th Guards Army of the 1st Baltic Front. Karamushko was relieved from duty on 3 February 1945 for health reasons and placed at the disposal of the front military council before being appointed commandant of Tilsit. From 8 May he served as commandant of Allenstein.

== Postwar ==
After the end of the war, Karamushko was placed at the disposal of the personnel department of the 3rd Belorussian Front in August 1945, and in January 1946 appointed commander of the 162nd Guards Rifle Regiment of the 54th Guards Rifle Division of the Baranovichi Military District. After the disbandment of the division in June, he was placed at the disposal of the military council of the Belorussian Military District before being transferred to the reserve on 16 August 1946. He died in November 1998.

== Awards ==
Karamushko was a recipient of the following decorations:

- Order of Lenin
- Order of the Patriotic War, 1st class
- Order of the Red Star
- Order of the Badge of Honor
