= Aleksandr Borisovich Rodionov =

Soviet colonel (1902–1944)

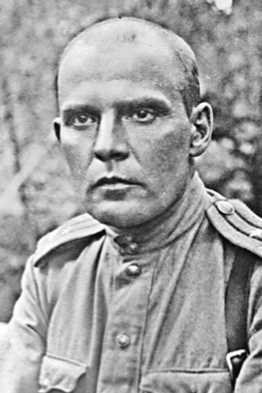
- Rodionov, 1943–1944
- Born: 12 September 1902; Troitskosavsk, Transbaikal Oblast, Russian Empire
- Died: 19 July 1944 (aged 41)
- Allegiance: Russian SFSR; Soviet Union
- Branch: Red Army (later Soviet Army)
- Service years: 1921, 1922–1944
- Rank: Colonel
- Commands: 130th Separate Rifle Brigade; 32nd Rifle Division; 91st Guards Rifle Division
- Conflicts: Russian Civil War; World War II (DOW)
- Awards: Order of the Red Banner (2x)

Aleksandr Borisovich Rodionov (Russian: Александр Борисович Родионов; 12 September 1902 – 19 July 1944) was a Red Army colonel who held division commands during World War II.

A veteran of the final stages of the Russian Civil War, Rodionov rose to command and staff positions between the wars. He began World War II as a division chief of staff and spent more than a month behind German lines. After a series of staff assignments, Rodionov commanded a brigade in the Battles of Rzhev. In mid-1943 he became acting commander of the 32nd Rifle Division, which he led in the Smolensk operation. From late December 1943 to early May 1944 he commanded the 91st Guards Rifle Division in eastern Belorussia, but was relieved for excessive drinking. Demoted to deputy commander of another division, Rodionov was mortally wounded during Operation Bagration.

== Early life and Russian Civil War ==
Rodionov was born on 12 September 1902 in the city of Troitskosavsk, Transbaikal Oblast to a working-class family. He graduated from a four-year city school in 1917 and worked as an unskilled laborer. Conscripted into the Red Army in September 1921, he was sent to serve as a Red Army man in the guard company of the border troops headquarters in Chita, but was discharged from service for family reasons in November of that year. Rodionov was reconscripted into the army in March 1922 and appointed to the Verkhneudinsk Guard Battalion. From May he was listed with the 2nd Rifle Regiment of the 1st Chita Brigade, and from July in the uyezd (district) military directorate at Iman. In September he was transferred to the 6th Khabarovsk Rifle Regiment of the 2nd Priamur Rifle Division, where he served as a company clerk and librarian. With the regiment, he fought in battles against the forces of Mikhail Diterikhs in the Primorsky operation and the Spassk operation during the final months of the Russian Civil War.

== Interwar period ==
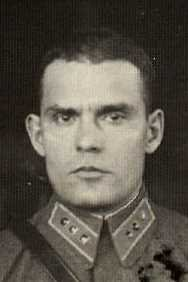
Rodionov in the late 1930s

From December 1923, Rodionov served first as assistant politruk (political instructor) and then as politruk of the 2nd company of the 6th Khabarovsk Rifle Regiment. In November 1924 he transferred to the 5th Amur Rifle Regiment of the division, where he served as assistant commander of the long-service platoon and company politruk, as responsible organizer of the Komsomol bureau and assistant political lecturer of the regimental school, and as assistant company commander for political section. In September 1927 he was sent to the Refresher Course for Commanders of the Siberian Military District at Irkutsk, and, upon graduation in June 1928, was appointed to the 107th Vladimir Rifle Regiment of the 36th Rifle Division, where he served as commander of a platoon, rifle company, and supply company, battalion chief of staff, and assistant chief of staff of the regiment. During the Sino-Soviet conflict of 1929 his regiment guarded the Soviet border.

From April 1933 Rodionov studied at the Eastern Department of the Frunze Military Academy, and upon graduation in November 1936 was sent to serve as a senior tactics instructor at the Officers Improvement Course of the Intelligence Directorate of the Red Army. From September 1939 he was appointed assistant chief of the course and chief of the Training Department of the Advanced Officers Course of the 5th Directorate of the Red Army. In July 1940 the then Major Rodionov was transferred to serve as chief of the 1st (Operations) Department of the headquarters of the 112th Rifle Division of the Ural Military District, and on 10 June 1941 was appointed chief of staff of the division. Three days later, the division and its parent 22nd Army received orders to board trains to relocate west to the Western Dvina line in northeast Belorussia.

== World War II ==
When Operation Barbarossa began on 22 June, the 112th Rifle Division was in the Reserve of the High Command, still unloading at Dretun station in northeast Belorussia. From 26 June it fought in heavy fighting in the area of Krāslava as part of the 51st Rifle Corps of the 22nd Army, then retreated towards Nevel. On 14 July the corps was 40 kilometers (25 mi) from Nevel, and the city itself had already been captured by advancing German troops, encircling the 51st Rifle Corps. On the night of 23–24 July the division attempted to break through, but Rodionov and a small group of commanders and soldiers were separated from the main group led by division commander Colonel Ivan Kopyak. Rodionov decided to break out of the encirclement independently. For more than a month he led the group through the German rear, taking the route through Yeserishche, moving north of Usvyaty and then through Kresty. On his way other encircled parties joined the group, from which Rodionov organized six partisan detachments. By the morning of 26 August Rodionov's detachment neared the frontline, and he ordered it to break out of the encirclement group by group. Rodionov himself reached Soviet lines on 3 September in the Mezha sector in the area of the village of Zikeyevo.

After departing the encirclement, Rodionov was placed in the officer reserve of the 22nd Army, and in early December was appointed chief of the Combat Training Department of the 22nd Army. As part of the Kalinin Front, the army fought in the defense of the city of Kalinin, then in the offensive towards Rzhev. In February 1942 he was shifted to another staff role as chief of the Operations Department of the Headquarters of the 2nd Guards Rifle Corps. From March to April he was hospitalized due to a serious illness. After recovering Rodionov became senior assistant chief of the Operations Department of the Kalinin Front headquarters. In June he was transferred to serve as chief of the Operations Section of the Operations Department of the 39th Army headquarters. In early July German troops attacked on the flank of the army and encircled it in the area of Bely during the Battles of Rzhev.

For two weeks the 39th Army fought in encirclement, and after breaking through to Soviet lines, on 17 September the then Lieutenant Colonel Rodionov took command of the 130th Separate Rifle Brigade. The brigade defended positions north of Rzhev, and from November joined the 30th Army of the Western Front. In early December the brigade launched unsuccessful attacks, sustaining heavy losses at the village of Vorobyovo, in the run-up to Operation Mars. On 31 December Rodionov transferred to serve as the chief of staff of the 215th Rifle Division, before being promoted to colonel on 19 January 1943. During early 1943 the division defended positions northeast of Rzhev, and in March participated in the Rzhev-Vyazma Offensive, the Soviet advance during the German retreat from the Rzhev salient. Elements of the 215th entered Rzhev on 3 March. Shortly afterwards, Rodionov was sent to the front reserve. In July he was appointed chief of the Operations Department of the headquarters of the 39th Army of the Kalinin Front.

Rodionov served as acting commander of the 39th Army's 32nd Rifle Division, part of the 5th Guards Rifle Corps, from 25 August. He led it in the Dukhovshchina-Demidov offensive of the Smolensk strategic offensive, during which it captured Dukhovshchina and Rudnya. For his performance during the offensive, Rodionov was awarded the Order of the Red Banner, his first decoration, on 24 September. The citation read:

In the battles in the area of the Tsarevich river the 32nd Rifle Division, under the command of Colonel Rodionov, broke through the strongly fortified enemy defensive zone and inflicted numerous serious defeats on the enemy. In the subsequent offensive on Dukhovshchina and during the pursuit of the enemy, the 32nd Rifle Division skillfully operated to smash the intermediate lines of the enemy and eliminate his strongpoints, not giving the enemy the opportunity to use them to delay the advance.

Comrade Rodionov displayed skill, ability, and personal courage. In the strenuous period of the battle Comrade Rodionov time and again under strong enemy fire appeared in the decisive sectors and oversaw the progress of the battle in his zone through personal leadership.

To the southwest of Liozno the enemy attempted to halt the advance of our units on the Moshna river. Comrade Rodionov made a bold decision: he sent one regiment of his division through a swamp, where the enemy did not expect our operations. The regiment reached the enemy rear and wiped out the enemy strongpoint of Goreliki. The thrust against the enemy was felt so much that the enemy began to hurriedly retreat from the line of the Moshna on the entire front of the corps.

For skillful leadership of units in battle and for displaying in this personal courage Colonel Rodionov is deserving of a state award: the Order of the Red Banner.

He was relieved of command on 19 October due to the poor state of his health and was sent to the rear for treatment. After recovering, Rodionov returned to the 39th Army and was appointed commander of the 91st Guards Rifle Division of the 5th Guards Rifle Corps on 20 December. When he arrived to take command, the division was involved in the Gorodok offensive, a series of unsuccessful attacks towards Vitebsk from the east. The division took part in repeated unsuccessful attacks towards Vitebsk that began on 8 January 1944. Another offensive towards Vitebsk began on 3 February and continued until 17 February, inflicting significant casualties and reducing the German salient around Vitebsk. As a result of his performance in these actions, Rodionov was evaluated in combat characteristics as "tactically competent and correctly able to manage battle, which he demonstrated during the breakthrough of German defensive lines in the area of Goloburdy and Bondari on 3 February 1944." Despite this positive assessment, Rodionov became known for his heavy drinking, and one of his regimental commanders, Moisei Mdinaradze, recalled that corps commander Ivan Bezugly was always trying to catch him drunk. After a March incident when Rodionov showed up drunk to Mdinaradze's command post, Rodionov began drinking with his stableman. Rodionov was relieved on 2 May for what the 91st Guards' war diary described as "regular drinking binges" and sent to the front reserve. On 5 May he returned to duty as deputy commander of the 220th Rifle Division, then in the reserve of the 31st Army. In early June the division and its army were relocated to the 3rd Belorussian Front in the area east of Goroshkovo on the left bank of the Dnieper, where they trained for the upcoming offensive.

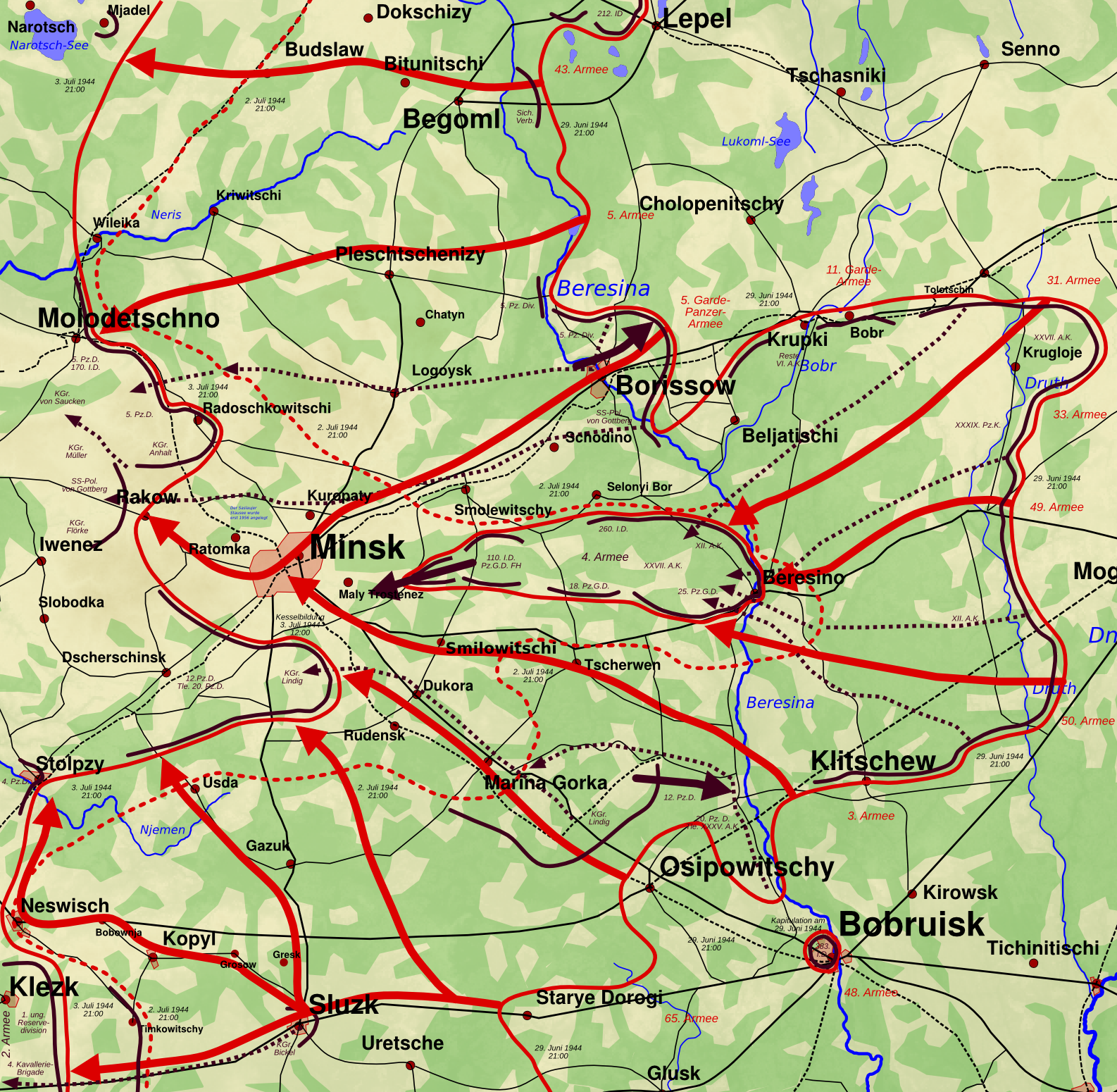
The Minsk offensive

The 220th fought in the Vitebsk–Orsha offensive from 23 June, with Rodionov leading the division forward mobile detachment, its vanguard. On 27 June Rodionov's detachment advanced into the eastern part of Orsha and captured the sole surviving railway bridge before it could be blown up, conducted an assault crossing of the Dnieper, and ensured the crossing of the remainder of the army. Continuing the offensive, it reached the eastern bank of the Berezina in the Novoselki area, assault-crossing the river and on 2 July reached the Moscow-Minsk highway in the area of Zhodino. In the morning of 3 July the vanguard of the division mounted on motor vehicles in cooperation with the 2nd Guards Tank and Cavalry Corps entered Minsk during the Minsk offensive. After the capture of the city, the division continued the pursuit towards Rakov. The division entered Ivenets on 8 July, Ivye on 10 July, and was in battle for Lida on 11 July. On 14 July the vanguard of the division, under the command of Rodionov, assault-crossed the Neman in the area of Zaritsa and Berzhany, 6-7 km north of Grodno, and for two days repulsed German attacks. During the fighting to expand the bridgehead, Rodionov was mortally wounded on 16 July, and died of his wounds two days later on 19 July. Rodionov, survived by his wife, was buried in a military cemetery in Grodno. He was posthumously awarded a second Order of the Red Banner on 30 October for his performance during the Vitebsk–Orsha offensive. The citation read:

Guards Colonel Rodionov, during the breakthrough of the strongly fortified zone of the enemy on 23 June 1944 in the area of the city of Dubrovna, was with the forward units the entire time, and at the forward observation point. He assisted the regimental commanders in the organization of the battle and in the implementation of the decisions of the division commander. Commanding the mobile detachment of the division he forced a crossing of the Berezina river and his detachment together with tank units were first to enter the city of Minsk and capture it. In the battles, he conducted himself firmly and courageously and skillfully fulfilled combat missions with urgency. Guards Colonel Rodionov is deserving of a state award: the Order of the Red Banner.
