= Bezugly =

Bezugly or Bezuhly (Ukrainian: Безуглий; Russian: Безуглый) is a surname. Its feminine forms are Bezuhla (Ukrainian: Безугла) and Bezuglaya (Russian: Безуглая). Notable people include:

- Ivan Bezugly (1897–1983), Soviet-Ukrainian Red Army officer
- Mariana Bezuhla (born 1988), Ukrainian politician
- Sergiy Bezugliy (born 1984), Ukrainian and Azerbaijani sprint canoeist
