= Gegenmiao massacre =

1945 massacre by the Soviet Red Army

- Part of the Soviet–Japanese War, World War II
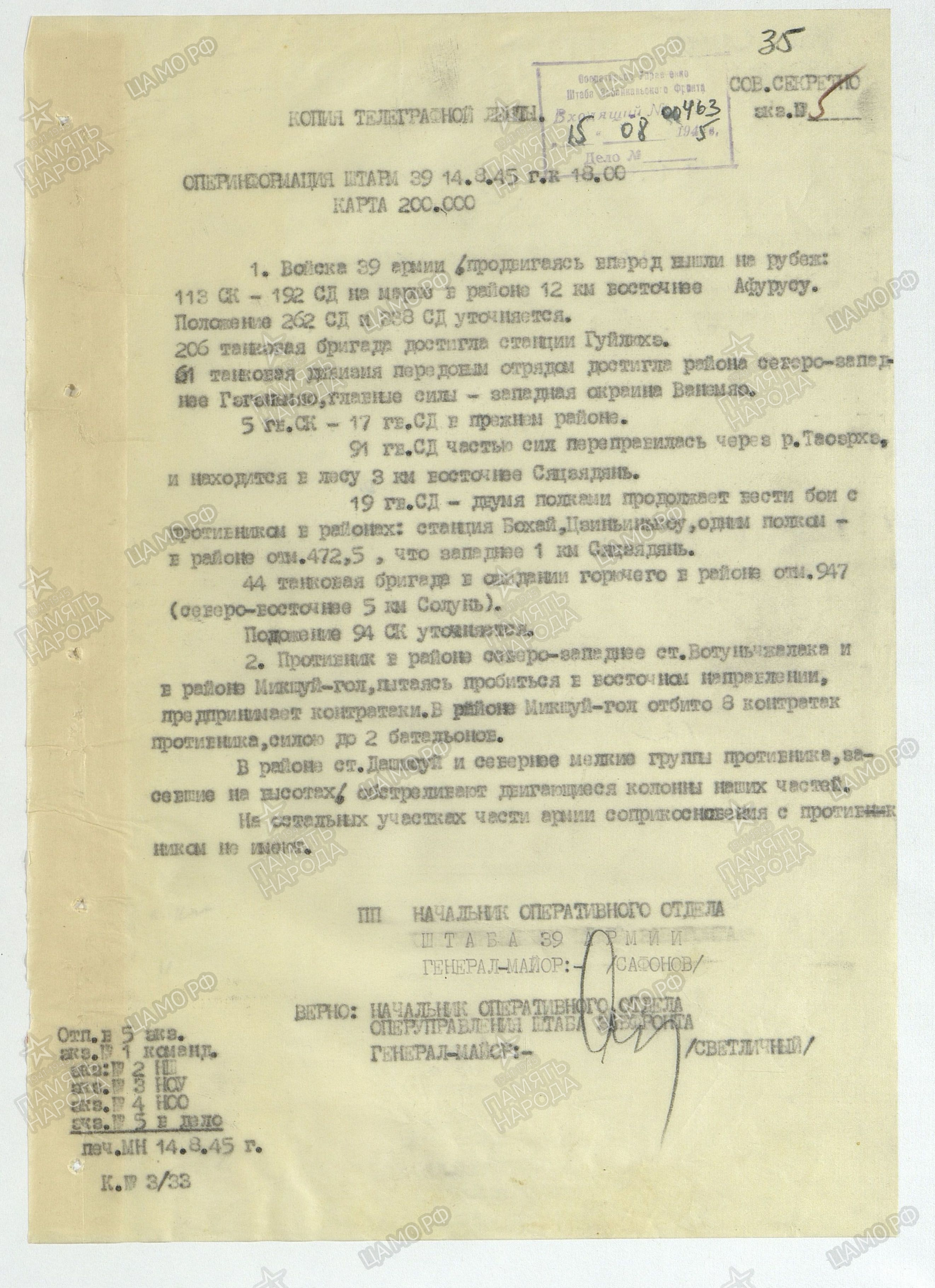
- Reports from the Soviet 39th Army after the massacre, 14 August 1945.
- Location: Gegenmiao lamasery
- Date: August 14, 1945
- Target: Japanese women and children
- Attack type: War crime, massacre, mass rape
- Deaths: Over 1,000
- Perpetrators: (Soviet Union) Red Army 39th Army and local Chinese rioters
- Motive: Anti-Japanese racism

The Gegenmiao massacre (Chinese: 葛根廟屠殺; pinyin: Gégēn miào túshā; Wade–Giles: Ko²-ken¹ miao⁴ tu²-sha¹) or the Gegenmiao incident (Chinese: 葛根廟事件; pinyin: Gégēn miào shìjiàn; Wade–Giles: Ko²-ken¹ miao⁴ shih⁴-chien⁴) was a war crime by the Red Army and a part of the local Chinese population against over half of a group of 1,800 Japanese women and children who had taken refuge in the lamasery Gegenmiao (Koken-miao) on August 14, 1945, during the Khingan–Mukden Operation in Soviet invasion of Manchuria.

Soviet soldiers committed the massacre in Gegenmiao/Koken-miao (present day: Gegenmiao zhen; 葛根廟鎭), a town in the Horqin Right Front Banner of the Hinggan League of Inner Mongolia. The Red Army shot refugees, ran them over with tanks or trucks, and bayoneted them after they raised a white flag. After two hours, Red Army soldiers had murdered well over one thousand Japanese refugees, mostly women and children. Angry Chinese civilians chased a group of Japanese refugees into a river, where many drowned. Soldiers raped several women and children, sometimes after murdering them. Chinese civilians raped and murdered a Japanese woman after Red Army soldiers murdered her child. The Red Army pursued and murdered a Japanese family that tried to hide in the trenches. The Red Army also beat mothers into submission in order to kidnap their children. In the market, a Japanese boy could sell for 300 yen, and a girl for 500 yen.

The Red Army murdered over 1,000 Japanese refugees by the end of the massacre.

== Progress of the case ==
On 8 August 1945, the USSR broke the Soviet-Japanese Neutrality Treaty and declared war on Japan, and furthermore, before dawn on 9 August, launched an invasion of Manchukuo, Korea and Sakhalin Island.

On 10 and 11 August, Xing'an (otherwise known as Xing'an Street or Wang'ya Temple. Later Ulanhot in the Hingan Autonomous Region of Inner Mongolia) was bombed, almost destroying the urban functions of Xing'an. It is estimated that 3,000 of the 4,000 civilians of the Xing'an General Administration were in Xing'an. Xing'an had long prepared for the Soviet invasion with the 'Xing'meng Measures', in which the evacuation plan was divided into three groups according to residential area and workplace location.

Group 1: The plan was to evacuate the inhabitants of the western half of Xing'an, led by Xing'an General Counsellor Gao Chuan, where the General Administration Office resided and the families of personnel related to the Military Academy also belonged.

Group 2: The plan was to evacuate the residents of the eastern half of Xing'an led by Counsellor Asano Ryozo, which included personnel from cooperative companies and the telegraph and telephone bureau. It is reported that many were self-employed and company employees.

Group 3: Tokyo EBARA Pioneer Group and Niyi Butsuri Pioneer Group

The Takatsuna team started their departure on the 10th and by the morning of the 11th, they were all on the last goods train and successfully made it out.

It is also explained that the Kwantung Army did not even inform the General Office officials of the retreat, and that the residents of the eastern area, many of whom were self-employed or office workers, were at a disadvantage in obtaining information and securing trucks and wagons, while the residents of the western area had military personnel who were the first to know about the situation.

In fact, on the 10th, when the Takatsuna Corps of Group 1, which included families of military personnel, was assembling, the Kwantung Army had rather requisitioned trucks and wagons that the Asano Corps of Group 2 had prepared based on the Manchurian measures, ostensibly as necessary for fighting the Soviet Army, while hiding the fact that the army was withdrawing itself. It is highly possible that the first to third groups were not mere divisions, but rather the order in which the Kwantung Army evacuated its own families and property first to ensure their escape.

As a result, not only did Asano's group miss the railway service, but also had trouble securing transport for the sick, elderly and infants, and finally managed to find one carriage, and at 4pm on the 11th, an action group was finally organised under Asano's command.

It is known that Ryozo Asano's unit also sent messengers to the surrounding settlements to encourage them to join up. That night, Ryozo Asano's action group entered the town of Urahata, 4 km east of Xing'an, where a cookout was also held and they spent the night in a school and air-raid shelter. Here, seven companies were formed, known as the 'Xing'an Seven Life Squadrons', and a handful of men with rifles and hand grenades were assigned to escort each company. The original destination of the action group was the 扎扎德特旗 (ジャライド旗) Ondol township (also known as Ondol township, Indol and Intor), about 100 kilometres to the north-east. However, the train was already gone, and although 30 horse-drawn wagons had been prepared earlier, these had been requisitioned by the Kwantung Army the day before (strictly speaking, one carriage was left behind for transporting sick people). In view of the fatigue of the women and girls and the security situation in the area, the plan was to go on foot to Gegenmiao Township, about 35 kilometres southeast of Xing'an Street, wait for the train (Bai'a Line) to Gegenmiao Station to arrive there, evacuate to Baichengzi (later Baicheng in Jilin Province) and take a train further south while receiving protection from the Kwantung Army there. The plan was changed and the movement started on the following day, the 12th. There are theories that the evacuees relied on the Gezhimen Temple as a place of protection and rest, that they relied on the assistance of Japanese lamas in the temple, and that the Qigong Police had buried a large quantity of opium in the Gezhimen Temple in preparation for an eventuality, and relied on it as an asset to make a living if the evacuees were stranded in Manchuria. On the evening of the 13th, heavy rain was said to have fallen.

At about 11:40 am on 14 August, when the action group reached the vicinity of the Gegenmyo Hill where the Lamaist temple is located, they encountered an infantry unit with 14 Soviet medium-sized tanks and 20 trucks. It is said that the column stretched for two kilometres at this time, and that there were about a hundred or so survivors, although it is not clear who witnessed the incident and to whom the story was told, reportedly. There are also stories that Asano was only trying to talk to them, but not about the white flag,[14] and that an old woman near Asano was always wearing a white blanket, so the white flag may have been confused with the old woman's blanket, which was inflated. Soviet troops launched an attack against the action column from the hilltop, with tanks advancing with machine-gun fire. The Soviet tanks continued the attack to some extent, then turned back and repeated the attack four or five times. When the tank attacks ceased, Soviet soldiers disembarked from trucks and tanks and shot and bayoneted survivors one after another as soon as they were found. Even those who escaped being killed by direct gunfire were often wounded by bullets or had family members killed, and many ended up with their families in their hands or committed suicide. It is estimated that only a hundred or so were later positively confirmed to have survived. Nearly 200 of the victims were pupils from the Xing'an Street Zaiman National School. The crucial Kwantung Army units that were supposed to be escorting and counter-attacking had already moved south.

Even after the Soviet soldiers left, there were sporadic sounds of gunfire, presumably due to suicide. In addition, local residents appeared to plunder the corpses and stripped the bodies of their clothes and other items. Others drowned in the river while trying to escape. One woman had her child killed by Soviet soldiers, followed by an attack by the Chinese, who stripped her of all her clothes and cut off her breasts with a sickle. When the Chinese found surviving mothers and children, they beat the mothers with sticks and took the children away. Children whose parents had been killed were gathered with the surviving adults, and the Chinese took them as well. At the time, it was common for Japanese boys to be sold for 300 yen and girls for 500 yen. Some of the survivors gathered in groups and began to commit mass suicide, stabbing to death those who wanted to commit suicide, and some men and even women left saying they would form a death squad with rifles and go for revenge, but it seems that they did not fight back.

After the war ended on 15 August, attacks continued against displaced persons who had survived and fled. According to the testimony of a 12-year-old girl who joined a group of about 10 women after the incident, the group of women she joined was attacked, robbed of their clothes and assaulted by the mob, and it took them over a week to reach Zhenxi Station, 10 km from Gegenmiao Station. The women decided to take shelter in an abandoned house in a field a short distance from the station, but at night they were discovered by Soviet soldiers, who assaulted them until midnight. When the assault was over, the Soviet soldiers threw a pile of dead grass from the outdoor area into the house, set it on fire and tried to burn the women to death. The girl and her sister testified that they were able to escape because they were near a window, but that the other women seemed to be unable to escape because of the speed of the fire. The girl who survived was then forced to live as a residual orphan.

Meanwhile, some Chinese, Mongolians and Koreans provided food for the survivors, and some Chinese were generous with their children. The surviving children of the action group, whose parents were killed, became Chinese residual orphans for various reasons. About 30 became residual orphans. Many women were also forced to become Chinese residual women.

200 students from a local school were killed, including the headmaster and his wife.

Fujiwara Sakuya describes this incident as the greatest tragedy encountered by Japanese refugees in Manchuria at the end of the war, in that they were indiscriminately massacred by the attack of one country's army rather than by a mob. However, in terms of the number of casualties, the Sado Kaitakudan incident (also known as the Sado Settlement Incident) is said to have killed more than 1,400 people, or in one theory, approximately 2,000 people, in self-determination and fighting with the Soviet Army. However, the victims of this incident were members of other pioneer groups who gathered in the vacant houses and facilities after the Sado pioneer group left the settlement). The Sado Settlement Site Incident is usually referred to as the "greatest tragedy of the Zenman Settlement".

As for the cause or trigger of the incident, there are theories that Soviet planes came to reconnaissance the day before and on the day of the incident and dropped bombs, and that the reconnaissance planes guided the group, or that the group had a problem with local Mongolians when they stayed in Gegnebiao Village the night before and reported the incident. Conversely, there is also testimony that although Soviet aircraft were constantly flying over, they did not attack them in any particular way, so they were not on special alert. Some said that the attack was so fierce that they thought they were mistaken for Japanese troops because the men were carrying firearms for protection, and in fact, there were Japanese scouts and messengers in the vicinity, although not a large contingent, who also witnessed the incident. The refugees actually mistaken for a large contingent of Japanese troops.

In general, the displaced persons' groups at this time often had weapons as small as rifles, and sometimes there were even groups equipped with light machine guns. In the pioneer groups that originally dealt with bandits and others, women sometimes took part in the fighting. Alternatively, it is possible that some kind of fighting had already occurred with other Japanese civilian groups during this period before the end of the war, and that the Soviet Army, which also had female soldiers, was under the impression that the Japanese, even as a civilian group, mixed with women and girls and participated in the fighting. There are also theories that Soviet generals who wanted to use the weapons supplied to them may have been turned off by the fact that the Kwantung Army had fled so quickly that they turned their spears towards the refugees.

According to Soviet military combat records, on 14 August, the Soviet 17th Guards Rifle Division, 19th Guards Rifle Division, 91st Guards Rifle Division and 61st Tank Division (belonging to the 5th Guards Rifle Corps of the 39th Army. The commander was Senior General I.I. Lyudnikov) stopped in the area north-west of the Gezhne Temple, but no combat action took place in the vicinity of that place and no shots were fired. On 15 August, this unit continued its attack on Bai Chengzi and occupied Bai Chengzi Station, which was then occupied by a group of tanks from the 61st Tank Division. In looking at published documents after perestroika, nothing written about this has been found until 2014.

== Aftermath ==
Survivors and their families designated August 14 as a day of memorial for the event. The ceremony occurs in the temple of Gohyakurakan-ji in Tokyo.

In 2017, a documentary named Witness to the Gegenmiao Massacre was released, directed by a survivor whose mother and little siblings were murdered by Red Army soldiers in the massacre.

== See also ==
- Mashan massacre
- Sado Settlement Site massacre
- List of massacres in China
- Soviet war crimes
- Allied war crimes during World War II
- Nemmersdorf massacre
- Massacre of Grischino
