= Vasily Kozhanov =

Soviet military general

Vasily Ivanovich Kozhanov
- Kozhanov, 1945
- Born: 22 March 1904; Verkhnekizilskoye, Orenburg Governorate Russian Empire
- Died: 24 November 1988 (aged 84) Moscow, Soviet Union
- Buried: Donskoye Cemetery
- Allegiance: Russian SFSR; Soviet Union
- Branch: Red Army (later Soviet Army)
- Service years: 1921–1937; 1939–1959
- Rank: Major general
- Commands: 91st Guards Rifle Division
- Conflicts: World War II
- Awards: Hero of the Soviet Union; Order of Lenin (2); Order of the Red Banner (3)

Vasily Ivanovich Kozhanov (Russian: Василий Иванович Кожанов; 22 March 1904 – 24 November 1988) was a Soviet Army major general and a Hero of the Soviet Union.

== Early life and prewar service ==
Vasily Ivanovich Kozhanov was born in the village of Verkhnekizilskoye, Verkhneuralsky Uyezd, Orenburg Governorate on 22 March 1904. He joined the Red Army in January 1921 and became a cadet of the 21st Siberian Infantry Course at Semipalatinsk. The course was disbanded in late 1922 and Kozhanov was transferred to the 24th Omsk Infantry School, which was relocated from Omsk to Vladivostok in 1923. After graduating from the school in September 1924, Kozhanov served as a rifle platoon commander and regimental school platoon commander in the 166th Rifle Regiment of the 56th Rifle Division of the Leningrad Military District. From September 1927 to August 1928 Kozhanov studied at the Engels Military-Political Course in Leningrad. After completing the course, he returned to the division and became a company politruk and secretary of the regimental party bureau in the 167th Rifle Regiment. He transferred to become a company commander in the 168th Rifle Regiment of the division in February 1931, and commanded tank and training companies in the divisional tank battalion from January 1932.

Kozhanov transferred to the 29th Rifle Regiment of the 10th Rifle Division in November 1933, serving as a company commander and chief of the regimental school. From May 1936 he headed a training group and served as an instructor at the Northern Military Commissariat Training Center at Arkhangelsk. On 29 June 1937 Kozhanov was dismissed from the army during the Great Purge but was not arrested and instead lived in Barnaul, where he worked as an economist and planner for the city economic department, and from June 1939 at the city grain elevator. Kozhanov was recalled by the army on 11 December 1939 and appointed a battalion commander in the 693rd Rifle Regiment of the 178th Rifle Division of the Siberian Military District at Barnaul.

== World War II ==
When Operation Barbarossa began, the 178th Rifle Division was at the Omsk and Slavgorod camps. On 29 June 1941 the division joined the 24th Army and was sent to the front, where it joined the front of reserve armies, which became the Reserve Front on 30 July. In August then-Major Kozhanov took command of the 693rd Rifle Regiment, which he led in the Battle of Smolensk. The unit entered battle on the Western Dvina west of Nelidovo. From 3 September the division became part of the 29th Army of the Western Front and fought in fierce offensive battles on the eastern bank of the river with advancing German units in the area of Ivashkina Gora and Borok. During the Vyazma defensive operation in October, the division fought in rearguard actions towards Rzhev, covering the retreat of the 22nd and 29th Armies. On 26 October the division dug in on the line of Gorodishche, Perlevo, Pachino, halting the German advance at Torzhok. Subsequently, the regiment and division fought in the Kalinin defensive and offensive operations. During the latter, the division covered the right flank of the 39th Army. On 10 January 1942 they cut the Rzhev–Velikiye Luki highway and then advanced to the southwest. From 19 February, the 178th was part of the 30th Army of the Kalinin Front.

From 11 March then-Lieutenant Colonel Kozhanov commanded the 1196th Rifle Regiment of the 359th Rifle Division, leading it in the Battles for Rzhev, Kholm-Zhirkovsky, and Yartsevo. In the summer and fall the regiment was on the defensive northeast of Rzhev. On 5 February 1943 Kozhanov was appointed deputy commander of the 220th Rifle Division, with which he fought in the Rzhev-Vyazma Offensive. In June he was sent to study at the Voroshilov Higher Military Academy. After completing the accelerated course there in April 1944 Kozhanov was sent to the 3rd Belorussian Front and on 8 May took command of the 91st Guards Rifle Division. From 23 June it fought as part of the 39th Army in the Vitebsk–Orsha offensive, the Vilnius offensive, and the Kaunas offensive. From 3 to 4 August elements of the division reached the Dubysa, conducted an assault crossing of it, and fought to expand their bridgehead, then on 10 August transitioned to the defensive. For its performance in the breakthrough of German fortifications south of Vitebsk the division was awarded the Order of the Red Banner on 2 July, and for the capture of Kaunas it received the Order of Suvorov, 2nd class, on 12 August.

During October, the division fought in the Memel Offensive and the Gumbinnen Operation. From January 1945 Kozhanov led the division in the Insterburg–Königsberg offensive. In the face of multiple counterattacks, the division assault-crossed the Inster on 18 January and captured 26 fortified points, then on 22 January assault-crossed the Deime and continued the offensive to the southwest to reach the outskirts of Königsberg. On 2 February the division received the order to turn west towards the Baltic Sea. On the same day the 91st Guards captured the key road junction of Germau, going from the north to the south at Pillau. From 2 to 11 February the division fought in encirclement, then broke through to Soviet lines. After returning from encirclement the division was in the corps reserve, and on 19 February relocated of the area of Seerappen. For its actions the division was awarded the Order of Lenin on 19 February and Kozhanov was made a Hero of the Soviet Union and was awarded the Order of Lenin on 19 April 1945. In April, the division fought in the Konigsberg offensive and the Samland offensive, in which it fought in battles for the capture of the city of Konigsberg.

Kozhanov was promoted to major general on 5 May 1945. From May to June the division was relocated to Mongolia with the 39th Army in preparation for the Soviet invasion of Manchuria. As part of the Transbaikal Front and the army, the division fought in the Khingan–Mukden offensive. During the operation, the division crossed the Greater Khingan and on 10 August crossed the Urlengui-gol river and by 19 August concentrated 10 km southeast of Taonan. From 21 to 23 August the division was relocated to Mukden, and by 1 September was in Port Arthur. For distinguishing itself in the breakthrough of the Manzhouli–Jalainur and Halun–Arshan fortified regions and the crossing of the Greater Khingan, the division received the Khingan honorific on 20 September 1945.

== Postwar ==
After the end of the war, Kozhanov continued to command the division as part of the Primorsky Military District at Port Arthur. From July 1946 he was deputy commander of the 39th Army for civil administration and commandant of Dalian, then from July 1947 served as deputy commander of the 72nd Rifle Corps. From June 1949 he served as chief of the district Combined Officers Improvement Course at Voroshilov. After completing the Higher Academic Course at the Voroshilov Higher Military Academy between October 1951 and December 1952, Kozhanov returned to his previous posting. In December 1953 he was sent to the Voroshilov Academy to become a senior instructor in the large-unit tactics department. Kozhanov retired due to illness on 24 October 1959. He died in Moscow on 24 November 1988 and was buried at the Donskoye Cemetery.

== Awards ==
Kozhanov was a recipient of the following awards and decorations:

Hero of the Soviet Union (19 April 1945)
Order of Lenin, twice (19 April 1945, 20 June 1949)
Order of the Red Banner, thrice (3 November 1944, 8 November 1944, 5 November 1954)
Order of Suvorov, 2nd class (4 July 1944)
Order of Suvorov, 3rd class (12 February 1943)
Order of Kutuzov, 2nd class (31 August 1945)
Order of the Patriotic War, 1st class (11 March 1985)
Medal "For Courage" (20 June 1942)
Medal "For the Capture of Königsberg" (1945)
Medal "For the Victory over Germany in the Great Patriotic War 1941–1945" (1945)
Medal "For the Victory over Japan" (1945)
Jubilee Medal "Twenty Years of Victory in the Great Patriotic War 1941-1945" (1965)
Jubilee Medal "Thirty Years of Victory in the Great Patriotic War 1941–1945" (1975)
Jubilee Medal "Forty Years of Victory in the Great Patriotic War 1941–1945" (1985)
Medal "Veteran of the Armed Forces of the USSR" (1976)
Jubilee Medal "In Commemoration of the 100th Anniversary of the Birth of Vladimir Ilyich Lenin" (1969)
Jubilee Medal "30 Years of the Soviet Army and Navy" (1948)
Jubilee Medal "40 Years of the Armed Forces of the USSR" (1957)
Jubilee Medal "50 Years of the Armed Forces of the USSR" (1967)
Jubilee Medal "60 Years of the Armed Forces of the USSR" (1978)
Jubilee Medal "70 Years of the Armed Forces of the USSR" (1988)
Medal "60 Years of the Mongolian People's Army" (Mongolia)

- Honorary Citizen of Raseiniai
