= Veniamin Beylin =

Red Army major general

Veniamin Lvovich Beylin
- Beylin, before 1941
- Born: 25 August 1904; Barvenkovo, Kharkov Governorate, Russian Empire
- Died: 16 March 1982 (aged 77) Moscow, Soviet Union
- Allegiance: Soviet Union
- Branch: Red Army (later Soviet Army)
- Service years: 1923–1955
- Rank: Major general
- Commands: 2nd Guards Rifle Corps; 91st Guards Rifle Division
- Conflicts: World War II
- Awards: Order of Lenin; Order of the Red Banner (2)

Veniamin Lvovich Beylin (Russian: Вениами́н Льво́вич Бе́йлин; 25 August 1904 – 16 March 1982) was a Red Army major general.

== Early life and prewar service ==
Veniamin Lvovich Beylin was born to Jewish parents on 25 August 1904 in Barvenkovo, Kharkov Governorate. The son of a railroad employee, Beylin graduated from primary school and worked on the railroad. He joined the Red Army in September 1923 by volunteering as a cadet at the 4th Kiev Artillery School. After graduating from the school in October 1927, Beylin was appointed to the 80th Light Artillery Regiment of the 80th Rifle Division of the Ukrainian Military District at Artemovsk. With the regiment, he served as a platoon commander and acting battery commander, and as a battalion. In June 1931 he transferred to the Sumy Artillery School to serve as a battalion chief of reconnaissance. In December 1932 Beylin was appointed assistant chief of staff of the 24th Artillery Regiment of the 24th Rifle Division at Vinnytsia. Between May 1934 and October 1937 he received advanced training at the Frunze Military Academy, then served with the 100th Rifle Division of the Belorussian Military District as chief of staff of the 100th Artillery Regiment. He became chief of staff of the division artillery in April 1938 and a month later became chief of artillery of the division. From November 1938 Beylin served as chief of the 1st section of the artillery directorate and chief of artillery of the Vitebsk Army Group of Forces, then served in the same position at the headquarters of the North Caucasus Military District. He was sent to study at the Red Army General Staff Academy in December 1939.

== World War II ==
After Operation Barbarossa began, Beylin was released from the academy in July 1941 and placed at the disposal of the Military Council of the Northwestern Front, where he was appointed senior assistant chief of the operations department of the staff of the 27th Army. In this position, he fought in defensive battles on the Western Dvina, on the Velikaya on the line of Vybori and Opochka, and on the Lovat in the area of Kholm. In August the army fought in the Staraya Russa counterattack. Subsequently, its units fought in defensive battles in the Demyansk sector and by the beginning of October halted the German offensive on the line of Lake Velye and Lake Seliger. From 14 January 1942, then-Lieutenant Colonel Beylin served as deputy chief of staff of the 4th Shock Army, which fought in the Toropets–Kholm offensive as part of the Kalinin Front. Between 18 May 1942 and September 1943, he was chief of staff of the 2nd Guards Rifle Corps on the Kalinin Front, part of the 3rd Shock, 22nd, and 29th Armies. Then-Colonel Beylin served as temporary corps commander between 29 September and 24 October 1942, leading it in battles in the Nevel sector as part of the 3rd Shock Army. Between November 1942 and January 1943, the corps fought in the Velikiye Luki Offensive.

On 23 September 1943, Beylin took command of the 91st Guards Rifle Division, which he led until being transferred to serve as chief of staff of the 3rd Shock Army on 14 October. He was promoted to major general on 20 December. In the latter position, he participated in the Nevel Offensive and the offensive towards Idritsa during the winter and spring of 1944, and in the Rezhitsa–Dvinsk Offensive and Madona Offensive. On 12 August 1944 Beylin was relieved of his position by front commander Army General Andrey Yeryomenko for "loss of command control" and the slow pace of the advance of the 3rd Shock Army. Beylin was sent to the Frunze Military Academy, where he spent the rest of the war as a senior instructor in the operations training department.

== Postwar ==
After the end of the war, Beylin continued to serve at the academy. He became a senior instructor in the operational arts department on 14 November 1945, and was transferred to the Kuybyshev Military Engineering Academy in April 1949. There, Beylin served as deputy chief of the general tactics and operations training department before retiring on 15 February 1955. He died in Moscow on 16 March 1982.

== Awards ==
Beylin was a recipient of the following decorations:

- Order of Lenin
- Order of the Red Banner (2)
- Order of Bogdan Khmelnitsky, 2nd class
- Order of the Patriotic War, 1st class
- Order of the Combat Red Banner
- Medals
