= 32nd Rifle Division =

32nd Rifle Division (1934–1957)
- Active: 1934 – c. 1957
- Country: Soviet Union
- Branch: Red Army
- Type: Infantry
- Size: Division
- Engagements: Battle of Moscow, others

Commanders
- Notable commanders: Stepan Chernyak; Ivan Bezugly

The 32nd Rifle Division was an infantry division of the Red Army and later of the Soviet Army, formed three times.

== Interwar period ==
An order of 25 May 1922 combined the 2nd Saratov Separate Rifle Brigade and the 81st Rifle Brigade of the 27th Omsk Rifle Division to form the 32nd Rifle Division. It was located in Saratov (Volga Military District).

July 20, 1922 is the official birthday of the 32nd Rifle Division. According to the order RVSR number 1647/323 of 10 July 1922 excluding brigade unit in the divisional structure, the 32nd Rifle Division was reorganized on the basis of the 81st Rifle Brigade. Its 241st, 242nd, 243rd Rifle Regiments receive numbers respectively 94th, 95th, 96th. On 29 November 1922, by the order No. 2668/508 RVSR in connection with the adoption of patronage Saratov City Council awarded the division name: 32nd Saratov Rifle Division.

In 1934 it joined the Special Red Banner Far Eastern Army, serving the Far Eastern Military District as part of the 39th Rifle Corps. It took part in a number of border skirmishes with Japanese Manchukuo on the Manchurian border near Lake Khasan. By 1941 it consisted of the 17th, 113th, and 322nd Rifle Regiments and the 133rd and 154th Artillery Regiments. It was commanded by Colonel Viktor Ivanovich Polosukhin from 26 May 1941 to 18 February 1942 and by Colonel Stepan Trofimovich Gladyshev from 19 February to 24 May 1942.

== Operation Typhoon ==
While the 32nd Rifle Division was serving in the 25th Army of the Far East Military District, the Germans invaded the Soviet Union in Europe on June 22, 1941. The German Army Group Center in September paused near Smolensk because Hitler had ordered the capture of Kiev to secure the southern flank. This allowed the Soviets some time to prepare the defenses west of Moscow, but by the beginning of October the offensive toward the capital began again and was called Operation Typhoon by the Germans. The 32nd Rifle Division was ordered west and was rapidly transported by train to the Mozhaisk Defense Line, then manned by Dmitri Danilovich Lelyushenko's 5th Army. By October 10, the forward elements had arrived and dug in on the old Borodino battlefield, where the Russians had bled white Napoleon's Army in 1812. The best the division could hope for was to delay the German advance long enough to form a new line of defense further east. The Germans attacked with two veteran divisions, the 10th Panzer Division and the 2nd SS Division Das Reich on the 32nd's line of defense. On October 13 the fighting began in the Yelnya area (defended by the 17th Regiment). The battle continued for five more days until the exhausted Russians fell back further to the east and Mozhaisk fell on the 18th. The 32nd Rifle Division had traded its blood for time and had inflicted heavy losses on the Germans. It stayed on the front lines through November and took part in the Battle of Moscow.

The 32nd Division part in the battle of Moscow did not escape the notice of the Soviet high command and it was given the title 29th Guards Rifle Division on 24 May 1942 and the 17th Rifle Regiment received the Order of the Red Banner.

== Second Formation ==
The division was reformed and was back on the front line by 1 October 1942, and stayed fighting until 16 February 1944. It then fought again from 29 May 1944 to 9 May 1945 (Victory Day). (Perecheni No. 5). In August 1945, it was moved to Tambov in the Voronezh Military District with the 92nd Rifle Corps. The division was disbanded by the summer of 1946, along with the corps.

Commanders:

- Colonel Ivan Bezugly (16 June 1942 – 16 January 1943)
- Lieutenant Colonel Ivan Fyodorovich Dryomov (17 January–3 February 1943)
- Colonel Gavriil Antonovich Kutalyev (7 February–8 June 1943)
- Colonel Stepan Chernyak (9 June–24 August 1943)
- Colonel Aleksandr Borisovich Rodionov (25 August–12 October 1943)
- Colonel Yakov Romanovich Stolyarov (13 October–21 December 1943)
- Colonel Pyotr Karlovich Shteyger (22 December 1943 – 24 July 1944)
- Colonel Aleksandr Sergeyevich Belov (26 July–10 September 1944)
- Colonel Yakov Yakovlevich Verbov (11 September 1944 – February 1946; promoted to major general 20 April 1945)

== Third Formation ==
In 1955, the 207th Rifle Division was redesignated as the 32nd Rifle Division in 1955 at Stendal with the 3rd "Red Banner" Army. On 17 May 1957, it became the 32nd Motor Rifle Division.
