= 2nd Guards Rifle Corps =

- Active: December 1941–June 1956
- Country: Soviet Union
- Branch: Red Army (Soviet Army from 1946)
- Type: Infantry (Rifle corps)
- Engagements: World War II

The 2nd Guards Rifle Corps (Russian: 2-й гвардейский стрелковый корпус) was a rifle corps of the Red Army during World War II.

== World War II ==
=== 1942 ===
The 2nd Guards Rifle Corps headquarters was formed by a Stavka order of 31 December 1941. The corps headquarters was formed in the area of Nakhabino, where its units concentrated. From 3 February 1942 the corps became part of the Kalinin Front, entering battle in the zone between Staraya Russa and the Lovat river. On the first day of the offensive the corps advanced fifteen kilometers to the south and reached the Kholm highway. On 15 February in the area of Kholm the corps linked up with units of the 3rd Shock Army. The corps advanced deep into the rear of the Demyansk group of German troops and cut off its main forces in the Demyansk Pocket. At the end of February the neighboring 1st Guards Rifle Corps, also advancing from the north of the corps, linked up with the 42nd Rifle Brigade of the 3rd Shock Army in the area of Zaluchye. These actions thus formed the outer and inner fronts of the encirclement, with a gap between them of up to 40 kilometers. The German 16th Army was in encirclement for more than two months, but the Soviet forces did not manage to destroy the encircled troops.

From June 1942 the corps as part of the 3rd Shock Army of the Kalinin Front conducted intense battles for the town of Kholm, but could not take it.

=== 1943 ===
From 13 August 1943 units of the corps went over to the offensive in the area of Dukhovshchina. Meeting sustained German resistance, the divisions of the corps went over to the defensive. On 3 September the corps resumed the offensive, and creating a salient within the German defenses, consolidated on a line along the east bank of the Velenya river on 8 September. The corps began moving forward from 14 September and broke through the German defenses at Dukhovschina and reached the Tsarevich river. From 25 September, the corps, under the operational control of the 4th Shock Army, fought in battles on the Nevel axis. From 9 to 24 December the corps took part in the Gorodok offensive as part of the 3rd Shock Army.

=== 1944 ===
From 5 February 1944 the corps was part of the Kalinin Front, and in March went over to the defensive on the line of Vitebsk and Polotsk under the operational control of the 6th Guards Army. The corps fought in Operation Bagration, during which it participated in the Polotsk offensive and the battles in Daugavpils. In August the corps participated in fighting on the Nemunas, and at the end of August was relocated to the area southwest of Jelgava, taking positions on the approaches to that city on the line of Dobele and Žagarė, preparing for the offensive. The corps fought in the Memel Offensive in early October, attacking from the area northwest of Šiauliai on the Liepāja axis.

From October 1944 the corps fought in the encirclement of the Courland Pocket in the area of Priekulė, where it ended the war.

== Postwar ==
The corps took over coast defense of the area of Aizpute, Pāvilosta, Liepāja, and Rucava, alongside the 97th Rifle Corps of the 51st Army on 30 May 1945. The corps was relocated to the Kaunas area between 11 and 24 July.

After the end of the war, the corps became part of the Baltic Military District, headquartered at Kaunas. It included the:

- 9th Guards Rifle Division at Marijampolė,
- 71st Guards Rifle Division at Kaunas,
- 166th Rifle Division at Alytus.

All three divisions were disbanded during 1946 and 1947. By 1 May 1947, it included the 43rd Guards Rifle Division and 29th Guards Mechanized Division. During 1948 and 1949 the divisions were reorganized as separate rifle brigades, and at the beginning of 1949 the corps included the:

- 29th Guards Separate Rifle Brigade (formerly 43rd Guards Rifle Division),
- 42nd Guards Separate Rifle Brigade (formerly 51st Guards Rifle Division), and
- 44th Separate Rifle Brigade (formerly 16th Lithuanian Rifle Division).

After the brigades were expanded back into divisions the corps included the 43rd Guards and 51st Guards Rifle Divisions and the 29th Guards Mechanized Division on 1 May 1955. The corps headquarters, by then at Riga, was disbanded on 9 June 1956 as the number of corps headquarters in the Soviet Army was reduced. The 43rd Guards Rifle Division was disbanded weeks later, while the 51st Guards Rifle Division and the 29th Guards Mechanized Division came under direct district control.

== Commanders ==
The following officers commanded the corps:

- Colonel Aleksandr Lizyukov (1 January–April 1942)
- Ivan Chistyakov (April–September 1942)
- Veniamin Beylin (29 September–24 October 1942)
- Mikhail Pavlovich Kutuzov (October 1942–August 1943)
- Afanasy Beloborodov (August 1943–March 1944)
- Aleksandr Ksenofontov (June–August 1944)
- Major General Aleksey Baksov (21 August 1944–December 1945)
- Lieutenant General Arkhip Ruchkin (December 1945–18 January 1946)
- Lieutenant General of Tank Forces Makar Teryokhin (18 January 1946–June 1950
- Lieutenant General Arkady Yermakov (June 1950–3 June 1953)
- Lieutenant General Andrey Stuchenko (3 September 1953–19 June 1954)
- Lieutenant General Pyotr Lashchenko (19 June 1954–2 September 1955)
