= Afanasy Beloborodov =

Soviet military commander (1903–1990)

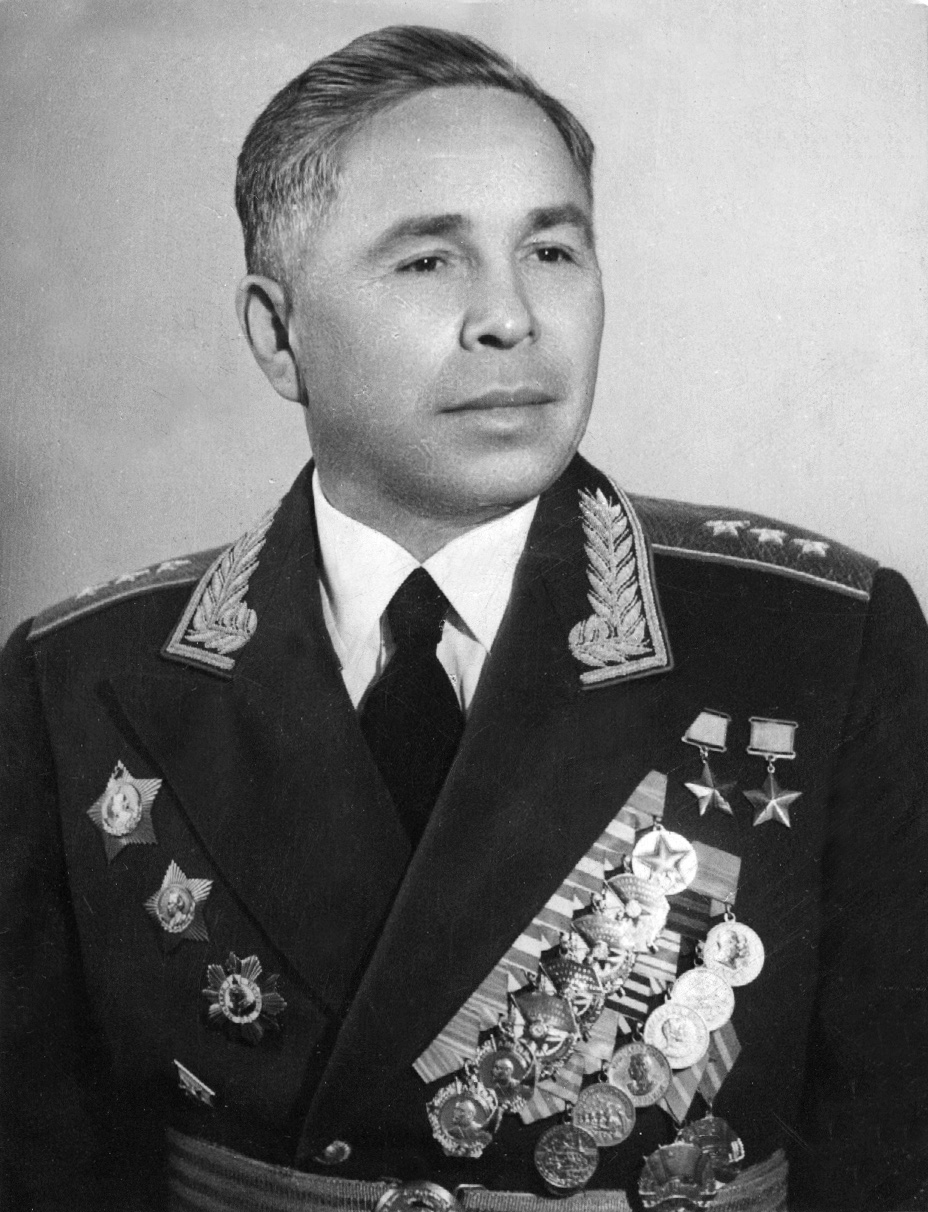
- Born: 31 January [O.S. 18 January] 1903; Akinino-Baklashi, Irkutsk Governorate, Russian Empire
- Died: 1 September 1990 (aged 87); Moscow, Russian SFSR, Soviet Union
- Military career
- Allegiance: Soviet Union
- Branch: Red Army; Soviet Army
- Service years: 1919–1920; 1923–1968
- Rank: Army general
- Commands: 78th Rifle Division; 9th Guards Rifle Division; 5th Guards Rifle Corps; 2nd Guards Rifle Corps; 43rd Army; 1st Red Banner Army; 39th Army; Voronezh Military District; Moscow Military District
- Conflicts: Russian Civil War; Sino–Soviet conflict; World War II
- Awards: Hero of the Soviet Union (twice)

Afanasy Pavlantyevich Beloborodov (Russian: Афана́сий Павла́нтьевич Белоборо́дов; 31 January [O.S. 18 January] 1903 – 1 September 1990) was a general in the Red Army during the Second World War who was twice awarded the title Hero of the Soviet Union. Between 1963 and 1968, he commanded the Moscow Military District.

== Early life ==
Beloborodov was born on 31 January [O.S. 18 January] 1903 in the Siberian village of Akinino to a family of Russian peasant farmers. Having completed only three grades of school, he joined the a partisan detachment at the age of sixteen and participated in the Irkutsk uprising. In 1920 the unit became incorporated into the 8th Irkutsk Rifle Regiment of the 1st Chita Rifle Division. He left the army that year, but re-enlisted in 1923. In 1926 he graduated from Nizhny Novgorod Infantry School and was appointed commander of a rifle platoon of the 6th Khabarovsk Rifle Regiment of the 2nd Priamur Rifle Division. He completed his military and political training in 1929, upon which he was made political commissar of the rifle company of the 107th Rifle Regiment of the 36th Rifle Division.

In November 1929 he was deployed to the border of China due to the Sino-Soviet conflict. The commander of his company was killed during the first battle, so Beloborodov took command. He successfully led the company in several battles and for doing so was awarded his first Order of the Red Banner. After the end of the conflict he remained in command of the company for one year. In 1933 he entered the Frunze Military Academy, which he graduated from in 1936, following which he was appointed assistant chief of the operational department of the staff of the 66th Rifle Division in the Far East. He became Operations Chief of Staff of the 31st Rifle Corps in March 1939. In June of that same year he was made Chief of Staff of the 43rd Rifle Corps. For the first six months of 1941 he was the head of department of military training of the Far Eastern Front.

== World War II ==
On 12 July 1941, Beloborodov was made commander of the 78th Rifle Division. In October he and his division arrived at the Western Front as part of the 16th Army. The division's actions in the Battle of Moscow were recognized in November 1941, and the division was honored with the Guards designation and renamed the 9th Guards Rifle Division. Beloborodov was subsequently promoted to the rank of Major-General.

The following spring and summer the 9th Guards Rifle Division, under the commanded of Beloborodov, carried out successful combat operations in the Southwestern Front at the Seversky Donets.

Later that year, Beloborodov was put in charge of the 5th Guards Rifle Corps. They successfully destroyed the enemy's defense in Velikiye Luki during the operation of the Kalinin Front.

In August 1943, Beloborodov was made commander of the 2nd Guards Rifle Corps. Under his leadership the troops enjoyed success in combat near Smolensk.

On 22 May 1944 he was placed in command of the 43rd Army, which soon engaged in the Operation Bagration and the Vitebsk–Orsha Offensive. On 26 June they expelled German forced from Vitebsk and then went with the Šiauliai Offensive.

Then he pursued the Baltic Offensive while forcing Germans into the Courland Pocket, after which his men participated in the Battle of Königsberg before taking out the remainder of the 2nd Germany Army near the Vistula.

Promoted to colonel general on 5 May 1945, in June 1945 he was transferred to the Far East and appointed commander of the 1st Red Banner Army.

After the start of the Soviet–Japanese War in August, his army was assigned to participate in the Harbin-Kirin operation. His troops broke through three lines of defense and advanced hundreds of kilometers through mountainous terrain to take control of Mudanjiang and Harbin, doing so with relatively few casualties.

== Postwar ==
Beloborodov remained in command of the 1st Red Banner Army until 1946, after which he stayed in the military and held numerous senior posts, including commander of the 39th Army.

In 1963 he was promoted to the rank of army general and became the commander of the Moscow Military District.

In 1966 he was badly injured in a car accident, and his long-term injuries resulted him requesting to be dismissed from command of the district.

He died on 1 September 1990 and was buried in the Lenino-Snegiri Military Cemetery.

== Awards and honors ==
=== Soviet ===
Hero of the Soviet Union, twice (22 July 1944, 19 April 1945)
Order of Lenin, five times (22 July 1944, 21 February 1945, 30 January 1963, 30 January 1983)
Order of the October Revolution (30 January 1973)
Order of the Red Banner, five times (22 February 1930, 9 January 1942, 3 November 1944, 15 October 1955, 22 February 1968)
Order of Suvorov, 1st class (8 September 1945)
Order of Suvorov, 2nd class (22 September 1943)
Order of Kutuzov, 1st class (8 February 1943)
Order of the Patriotic War, 1st class (11 March 1985)
Order for Service to the Homeland in the Armed Forces of the USSR, 3rd class (30 April 1975)
Medal "For the Defence of Moscow" (1944)
Medal "For the Defence of Stalingrad" (1942)
Medal "For the Capture of Königsberg" (1945)
Medal "For the Victory over Germany in the Great Patriotic War 1941–1945" (1945)
Medal "For the Victory over Japan" (1945)
Jubilee Medal "Twenty Years of Victory in the Great Patriotic War 1941-1945" (1965)
Jubilee Medal "Thirty Years of Victory in the Great Patriotic War 1941–1945" (1975)
Jubilee Medal "Forty Years of Victory in the Great Patriotic War 1941–1945" (1985)
Jubilee Medal "In Commemoration of the 100th Anniversary of the Birth of Vladimir Ilyich Lenin" (1969)
Jubilee Medal "30 Years of the Soviet Army and Navy" (1948)
Jubilee Medal "40 Years of the Armed Forces of the USSR" (1958)
Jubilee Medal "50 Years of the Armed Forces of the USSR" (1968)
Jubilee Medal "60 Years of the Armed Forces of the USSR" (1978)
Jubilee Medal "70 Years of the Armed Forces of the USSR" (1988)
Medal "Veteran of the Armed Forces of the USSR" (1976)
Medal "For the Development of Virgin Lands" (1956)
Medal "For Strengthening of Brotherhood in Arms"

=== Foreign ===
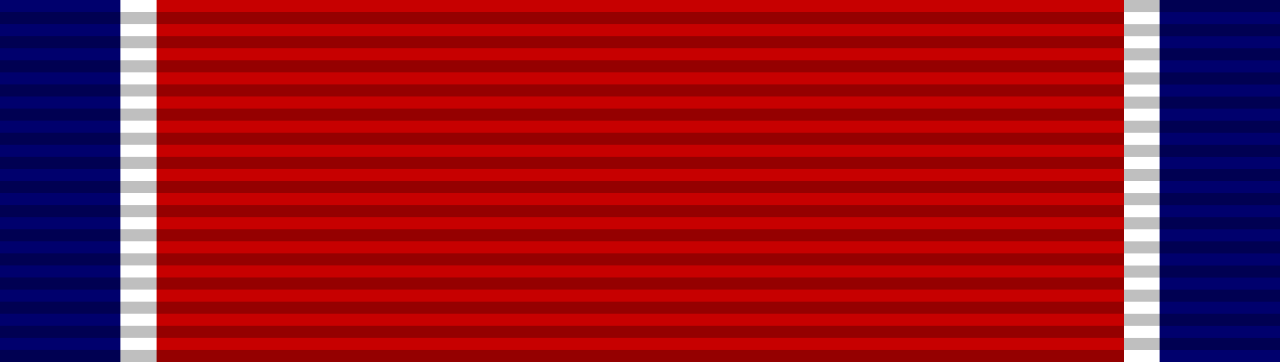
Order of The People's Republic of Bulgaria, 1st class (Bulgaria)
Medal "90th Anniversary of the Birth of Georgi Dimitrov"
Medal of Sino-Soviet Friendship, twice (China)
Military Order of the White Lion "For Victory", 1st class (Czechoslovakia)
Patriotic Order of Merit, Gold (East Germany)
Combat Order for Services to the People and the Fatherland, Gold (East Germany)
Order of Military Merit (Mongolia)
Medal "30 Years of the Victory in Khalkhin-Gol" (Mongolia)
Medal "40 Years of the Victory in Khalkhin-Gol" (Mongolia)
Medal "50 Years of the Mongolian People's Revolution" (Mongolia)
Medal "30 Years of Victory over Militaristic Japan" (Mongolia)
Medal "50 Years of the Mongolian People's Army" (Mongolia)
Medal for the Liberation of Korea (North Korea)
Brotherhood of Arms Medal (Poland)
Order of the War Banner (Yugoslavia)
