= Ivan Bezugly =

Soviet Red Army officer

Ivan Semyonovich Bezugly
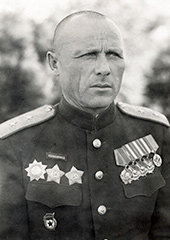
- Born: 23 October 1897; Starobilsk Raion
- Died: 4 December 1983 (aged 86); Moscow, Soviet Union
- Military career
- Allegiance: Soviet Union
- Branch: Red Army
- Rank: Lieutenant-general
- Commands: 5th Airborne Corps (1941); 32nd Rifle Division (1942); 158th Rifle Division (1943-44); 5th Guards Rifle Corps (1945); 39th Guards Airborne Corps
- Conflicts: World War II; Manchurian Operation

Ivan Semyonovich Bezugly (sometimes transliterated as Bezuglyi or Bezuglyy: Russian: Иван Семёнович Безуглый; 23 October 1897– 4 December 1983) was a Soviet Red Army officer who served as commander of the Red Army's 5th Airborne Corps in 1941, the first airborne corps of the Red Army to fight in World War II after the German invasion of the Soviet Union on 22 June 1941. Suffering heavy casualties just south of Daugavpils in combat against the advancing Panzer units of Army Group North in the summer of 1941, the unit made its way to the Moscow Military District on 15 August.

Promoted to lieutenant-general later in the war, Bezugly took part in the Soviet operations against Imperial Japan following the end of World War II in Europe as commanding officer of the 5th Guards Rifle Corps, which fought as part of Colonel-General Ivan Lyudnikov's 39th Army in the Soviet invasion of Manchuria in August 1945. The 5th Guards Rifle Corps captured Solun during the Manchurian operation.

== Early life, World War I and Russian Civil War ==
A Ukrainian, Ivan Semyonovich Bezugly was born on 23 October 1897 in the village of Zayerok, Starobelsky Uyezd, Kharkov Governorate. He worked as a baker in a bakery in Starobelsk. During World War I, Bezugly was mobilized for military service in October 1916 and sent to the Black Sea Fleet base at Sevastopol, where he graduated from the signallers' school and served as a sailor in the Black Sea coast signal service. In June 1918 he was discharged and with a troop train of sailors departed from Novorossiysk to the Povorino station, where he was demobilized.

As the Russian Civil War began, Bezugly joined the Red Army at Povorino on 25 June and commanded a platoon of the Kekholm Regiment. From August, he served as a Red Army man in the Cheka in Balashov, then commanded a company in the 2nd Brigade of the Ukrainian Front, the Special Group of the Kharkov Axis, and the Trans-Dnieper Ukrainian Soviet Division. From June 1919 he served in the 16th Rifle Division as an instructor of the political department, military commissar of the 137th Tambov Rifle Regiment, and political commissar of the 140th, 137th, and 138th Rifle Regiments. He took part in the fighting on the Southern Front against the Armed Forces of South Russia on the Seversky Donets and in the Ostrogozhsk region, in the August counteroffensive of the Southern Front, the Voronezh–Kastornoye operation and the offensive in Don Host Oblast in 1919. During the winter and spring of 1920, Bezugly fought in the Rostov–Novocherkassk Operation, the Don–Manych, Tikhoretsk, and Kuban–Novorossiysk operations. During the summer and fall of the year he took part in the Polish–Soviet War on the Western Front on the Polotsk, Ostrov and Minsk axis. He was twice wounded in action during 1920. For distinguishing himself in battle, Bezugly was awarded the Order of the Red Banner in 1922.

== Interwar period ==
After the end of the war, Bezugly continued to serve with the 16th Rifle Division as military commissar of the 48th Rifle Regiment. In September 1922 he was enrolled as a student in the Military-Political Seminary for Military Commissars in Petrograd, and on graduation in March 1923 posted to the 16th Division's 47th Rifle Regiment as a military commissar and acting regimental commander. Between October 1924 and August 1925 he completed the Vystrel courses. Bezugly was transferred to the division's 46th Rifle Regiment in October 1926, where he served as regimental military commissar and rose to commander and commissar of the regiment in March 1928. He completed the courses for additional party-political training of commanders at the Military-Political Academy in Leningrad between October 1929 and April 1930.

Sent to complete the Improvement Courses for Command Personnel of the Red Army Air Force at the Military Air Academy in December 1931, Bezugly was appointed assistant commander of the 21st Aviation Brigade for Materiel Support upon graduation in May 1932. From June 1933 he commanded the aviation regiment of the 3rd Airborne Brigade, and from December of that year served as assistant brigade commander. In October 1938 he was appointed commander of the 201st Airborne Brigade, which as part of the 15th Army successfully operated in the Winter War. For his "courage and valor displayed in battles," Bezugly, then a kombrig, was awarded a second Order of the Red Banner on 20 May 1940. He was appointed commander of the 5th Airborne Corps, forming in the Baltic Special Military District, in May 1941.

== World War II ==
After Germany invaded the Soviet Union, the corps fought on the Northwestern Front. During the border battles from 26 June to 3 July its units as part of the operational group of General Stepan Akimov took part in intense fighting with units of the 4th Panzer Group in the Daugavpils region, and subsequently retreated towards Pskov, then Kholm and Demyansk. In early October the corps stopped the German advance on the line of Lakes Velye and Seliger. In October Bezugly formed the 9th Airborne Corps in the Volga Military District, but was relieved of command on 30 March, for "using military aircraft for personal purposes and failure to carry out the orders of the Soviet Airborne Forces command to hand over aircraft to other units in time." He was demoted to colonel in June.

On 13 June, Bezugly was posted to command the 32nd Rifle Division, forming in the Moscow Military District at Borisoglebskoye, 20 kilometers from Murom. In early September, the division was transferred to the 43rd Army and arrived in the Naro-Fominsk region. That month it was sent to the front with the 43rd Army near Rudnya, and engaged in defensive actions as part of the Kalinin Front from 1 October. From December, the division held defensive positions northeast of Demidov.

From 6 January to 10 March 1943 Bezugly was treated in a hospital after being wounded, then was appointed commander of the 158th Rifle Division. He led it in the Rzhev-Vyazma Offensive, the Dukhovshchina–Demidov offensive, and the Smolensk offensive as part of the 39th Army of the Kalinin Front. Bezugly was restored to the rank of major general on 1 September, and for the capture of the important German-held junction of Liozno on the Vitebsk axis the division received the name of the town as an honorific on 10 October.

On 9 January 1944, Bezugly took command of the 5th Guards Rifle Corps. With the 39th Army of the 3rd Belorussian Front, he led it in the Vitebsk–Orsha offensive, Kaunas offensive, Memel Offensive, and East Prussian offensive. His performance in the Vitebsk–Orsha offensive was evaluated by the army commander Ivan Lyudnikov as follows:

The units and formations of the 5th Guards Rifle Corps, going over to the offensive on 23 June 1944, broke through the defenses of the enemy on the approaches to Vitebsk and inflicted substantial losses in personnel and equipment. On 24 June it reached the rear of the Vitebsk grouping, united with the units of the main force and closed the ring of the encirclement. From 24 to 26 June 1944 units and formations of the corps continued to split the enemy piece by piece and forced him to lay down his arms. For the breakthrough of the strongly fortified defensive zone of the enemy on the approaches to Vitebsk and the destruction of the enemy grouping Bezugly was awarded the Order of Suvorov 2nd class.

He was promoted to lieutenant general on 15 July. In January 1945 the corps broke through the Insterburg defensive region, ensuring the capture of Koenigsberg. For his leadership, Lyudnikov recommended Bezugly for the Order of Bogdan Khmelnitsky, 2nd class, which he received on 15 April. The recommendation read:

Commander of the 5th Guards Rifle Corps Lieutenant General Comrade Bezugly in the fighting to break through the strongly fortified and deeply echeloned defenses of the Germans on the border of East Prussia, in the region of Pilkallen and on the approaches to Koenigsberg, secured significant successes - units of the 5th Guards Rifle Corps under the command of Lieutenant General Comrade Bezugly successfully fulfilled their assigned objectives.

On 13 January 1945, units and formations of the corps, breaking through the defense of the enemy, went on the offensive, developing the offensive, operating day and night without a break, units of the corps on 19 January 1945 broke through the permanent, strongly fortified Insterburg Defensive Line, saturated with pillboxes, field fortifications and obstacles.

On 25 January 1945, as a result of their swift blow, units of the corps, by storm, employing maneuver on the battlefield, forced a crossing of the Deime river and repulsing repeated enemy counterattacks broke through the strongly fortified permanent defensive line on the west bank of the Deime river

In total, during the period of combat operations, the 5th Guards Rifle Corps fought up to 140 kilometers forward.

For skillful organization of the breakthrough of the defenses of the Germans on the Insterburg line and for the breakthrough of the permanent defenses on the Deime river, Lieutenant General Comrade Bezugly is deserving of the state award Order of Bogdan Khmelnitsky, 2nd class.

Bezugly was wounded and evacuated to a hospital on 25 February, and on his recovery at the end of April returned to command the corps. The corps ended the war in Europe in the Samland offensive. In May, after the German surrender, the corps and its parent 39th Army were withdrawn to the Reserve of the Supreme High Command and relocated by rail to Mongolia. In August, as part of the Transbaikal Front, the corps took part in the Khingan–Mukden offensive during the Soviet invasion of Manchuria. With the forces of its mobile group and forward detachments, the corps destroyed Japanese opposition covering the approaches to the passes of the Greater Khingan. Subsequently, the units of the corps took the cities of Ulanhot, Solun and Changchun. For skillful command of the corps in the operation Bezugly received the Order of Kutuzov, 1st class on 8 September.

== Postwar ==
After the end of the war, Bezugly continued to command the corps in the Primorsky Military District. From January to March 1947 he was at the disposal of the Cadre Directorate of the Ground Forces, then was sent to complete the Higher Academic Courses at the Voroshilov Higher Military Academy. On graduation from the courses in February 1948 he was appointed commander of the 39th Guards Airborne Corps. From February 1950 he served as assistant commander of the 11th Guards Army of the Baltic Military District. Bezugly was replaced and placed at the disposal of the Main Cadre Directorate of the Soviet Army in December 1952, before being retired due to illness on 20 June 1953. He died in Moscow on 4 December 1983.

== Awards ==
Bezugly was a recipient of the following awards and decorations:

- Order of Lenin
- Order of the Red Banner (4)
- Order of Kutuzov, 1st class
- Order of Suvorov, 2nd class (2)
- Order of Bogdan Khmelnitsky, 2nd class
- Medals
- Foreign orders and medals
