= 43rd Army (Soviet Union) =

- 43-я армия
- Active: 1941–1946
- Country: Soviet Union
- Branch: Red Army
- Type: Combined arms
- Size: Field army 11 divisions
- Part of: Western Front; Reserve Front; 2nd Belorussian Front; 3rd Belorussian Front; Kalinin Front
- Engagements: Battle of Moscow; Battle of Smolensk; Operation Bagration; Baltic Offensive; East Prussian Offensive

Commanders
- Notable commanders: Ivan Zakharkin Pavel Kurochkin; Konstantin Golubev Afanasy Beloborodov

The 43rd Army (Russian: 43-я армия) was a Red Army field army of World War II that served on the Eastern Front. Formed in late July 1941, the army fought in the Battle of Smolensk (1941). It was forced to retreat after German troops broke through in October 1941 and subsequently fought in the Battle of Moscow. The army then fought in the Rzhev-Vyazma Offensive. After the end of the offensive, the army held its positions and transferred to the Demidov area in late 1942. It fought in the Battle of Smolensk (1943). During the summer of 1944, the army fought in Operation Bagration. In the fall the army advanced into the Baltic region and fought in the Riga Offensive (1944) and the Battle of Memel. In 1945 the army fought in the East Prussian Offensive before being placed in reserve near the end of April. The 43rd Army was disbanded postwar in July 1946.

== History ==
=== Battles of Smolensk and Moscow ===
The 43rd Army was formed on 31 July 1941 in accordance with a Stavka order dated 30 July 1941. The army was formed from the 33rd Rifle Corps and was part of the Reserve Front. It was commanded by Lieutenant General Ivan Zakharkin. By 10 August, it included the following units.

- 38th Rifle Division
- 53rd Rifle Division
- 145th Rifle Division
- 149th Rifle Division
- 211th Rifle Division
- 217th Rifle Division
- 222nd Rifle Division
- 279th Rifle Division
- 303rd Rifle Division
- 104th Tank Division
- 109th Tank Division

From its formation the army defended the Desna River south of Yelnya on the line of Kholmets and Bogdanovo, fighting in the Battle of Smolensk. After the destruction of Group Kachalov, some of its units became part of the 43rd Army. On 6 August, the army was to attack and destroy the German troops around Roslavl. The attacks, launched in conjunction with the 24th Army were unsuccessful. On 8 August, Pavel Kurochkin was appointed army commander in place of Zakharkin. During the Dukhovschina Offensive, a portion of the army was to attack west across the Desna south of Yelnya. On 2 October, the 4th Panzer Group and the 4th Army attacked the 43rd Army at its boundary with the Bryansk Front. The German attack was part of Operation Typhoon and broke through the defenses of the 43rd Army, creating a 4-6 kilometer wedge in its positions. The army counterattacked with the 149th Rifle Division and the 148th Tank Brigade. The attack was stopped by German air attacks. On 3 October, the army became part of the Western Front. It was ordered to defend the Snopot River. The army was beaten to the river by German troops and became disorganized. On 7 October, Ivan Bogdanov reported that army commander Pyotr Sobennikov had only a group of staff officers with him. The army retreated in heavy fighting back to the Mozhaisk Defence Line. The army was pushed further back to the Nara River northwest of Serpukhov, where it stopped the German advance.

During December 1941 and January 1942, the army fought in the counteroffensive at Moscow. Until April 1942 it fought in the Rzhev-Vyazma Offensive. On 20 April the army was defending the line of the Vorya River and the Ugra River west of Medyn. The army held the line until the end of August. On 1 September, it became part of the Reserve of the Supreme High Command (Stavka Reserve) and reconcentrated in the area northeast of Demidov. On 1 October, the army was assigned to the Kalinin Front. On 12 October its troops occupied the defenses northeast of Demidov.

From January to August 1943 the army was positioned on the shores of Lakes Lososno, Rydov, Sapsho, and the village of Muzhitskaya, 42 kilometers north of Dukhovshchina. From 7 August to 2 October, the army was involved in the Battle of Smolensk. On 20 October the army became part of the 1st Baltic Front. Between November and December the army fought offensives towards Vitebsk.

=== Operation Bagration ===
In February 1944 the army moved to the Haradok area, where it took over the front from the 11th Guards Army. During the summer of 1944, the army fought in Operation Bagration. Between 23 and 29 June, the army fought in the Vitebsk–Orsha Offensive. The army's troops, operating in conjunction with the 6th Guards Army, broke through German defenses. Parts of the army along with the 39th Army surrounded five German divisions around Vitebsk and on 26 June captured the city. Subsequently, the army destroyed the German pocket and captured Lepiel on 28 June. The 43rd Army then fought in the Polotsk Offensive between 29 June and 4 July. During the offensive, the army advanced towards Hlybokaye. By 4 July it was in the Kazyany area. Developing the offensive towards Panevėžys, the army captured Švenčionėliai on 8 July. The army then repulsed several strong counterattacks and cut the Daugavpils-Vilnius Railway and Daugavpils-Kaunas Railway. By 14 July the army reached a line north of Salakas and Ovanty. During the advance towards Riga, the army fought in fierce battles for Biržai, which was finally captured on 6 August. From 13 August, the army defended the line of the Lielupe south and west of Bauska.

=== Operations in the Baltic ===
In September the 43rd Army fought in the Riga Offensive. In October, the army fought in the Battle of Memel. From mid-October to mid-January 1945 the army was involved in the blockade of the Courland Pocket. On 20 January the army was transferred to the 3rd Belorussian Front. Between 13 and 27 January it fought in the Insterburg–Königsberg Offensive. On 13 February it became part of the 1st Baltic Front. On 25 February the army became part of the 3rd Belorussian Front. The army fought in the Battle of Königsberg from 6 to 9 April and the Samland Offensive from 13 April. On 24 April the army became part of the front's reserve. It was moved to the area of Danzig, Gdynia, and Neustadt. On 1 May it became part of the 2nd Belorussian Front; by this time it included the 126th Rifle Division.

=== Postwar ===
The army remained in Poland with the Northern Group of Forces postwar. Colonel General Vasily Stepanovich Popov took command in July 1945. The army was disbanded in August 1946.

== Commanders ==
The following officers commanded the army.

- Lieutenant General Ivan Zakharkin (1 August 1941 – 8 August 1941)
- Lieutenant General Pavel Kurochkin (8 August 1941 – 22 August 1941)
- Lieutenant General Dmitry Seleznev (22 August 1941 – 2 September 1941)
- Lieutenant General Ivan Bogdanov (2 September 1941 – 5 September 1941)
- Major General Pyotr Sobennikov (5 September – 10 October 1941)
- Lieutenant General Stepan Akimov (10 October 1941 – 29 October 1941)
- Major General Konstantin Golubev (29 October 1941 – 22 May 1944)
- Lieutenant General Afanasy Beloborodov (22 May 1944 – until the end of the war)
- Colonel General Vasily Popov (July 1945 – August 1946)
