= 17th Guards Rifle Division =

17th Guards Rifle Division (17 Mar 1942 – 17 May 1957) 123rd Guards Motor Rifle Division (17 May 1957 – 1 Oct 1989) 129th Guards Machine-Gun Artillery Division (1 Oct 1989 – Sep 2001) 17th Guards Motor Rifle Division (Sep 2001 – Jun 2009) 70th Guards Motor Rifle Brigade (Jun 2009 – 2018)
- Active: 1942–2018
- Country: Soviet Union (until 1991); Russia
- Branch: Soviet Army (until 1991); Russian Ground Forces
- Type: Mechanized infantry
- Size: Division
- Garrison/HQ: Ussuriysk
- Engagements: World War II; Eastern Front; Battle of Smolensk; Operation Bagration; East Prussian Offensive; Invasion of Manchuria; Khingan–Mukden Offensive Operation
- Decorations: Order of the Red Banner; Order of Suvorov, 2nd Class
- Battle honours: Dukhovshchina; Khingan

Commanders
- Notable commanders: Maj. Gen. Aleksandr Dimitrievich Berezin; Maj. Gen. Aleksandr Petrovich Kvashnin

The 17th Guards Rifle Division (Russian: 17-я гвардейская стрелковая дивизия) was an infantry division of the Red Army during World War II. It was created on March 17, 1942, from the first formation of the 119th Rifle Division, in recognition of that division's stalwart defense against German Army Group Center in the Battle of Moscow, and in the subsequent strategic offensive that threw the German forces back from the capital. It became the 123rd Guards Motor Rifle Division in 1957 and converted into the 129th Guards Machine-Gun Artillery Division in 1989. In 2001, it was converted to the 17th Guards Motor Rifle Division and became the 70th Guards Motor Rifle Brigade in 2009. The brigade was reorganized as the 114th Guards Motor Rifle Regiment of the reformed 127th Motor Rifle Division in 2018. The regiment is currently based in Ussuriysk.

== Formation ==
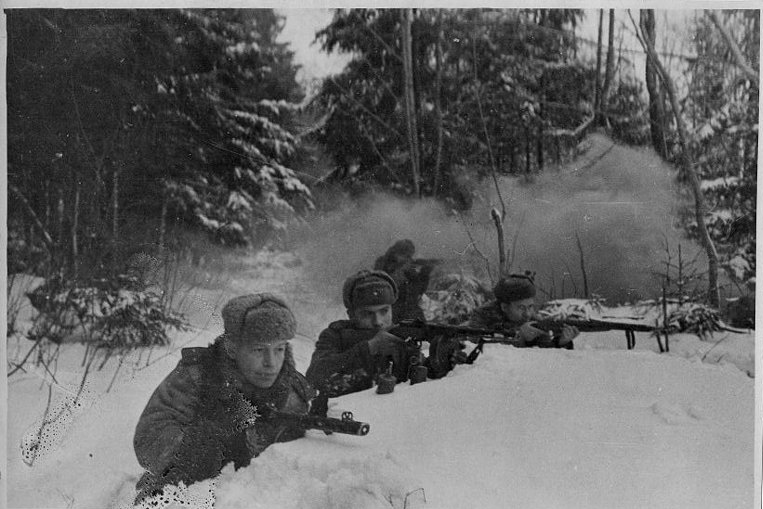
Guards Captains German Mikhailovich Dvoryaninov (chief of signals of the 52nd Guards Rifle Regiment), Ion Andreyevich Stepanov (deputy for political affairs of a battalion of the 52nd Guards), and Ryadovoy Fyodor Filippovich Litvin (signaller of the signal company of the 48th Guards Rifle Regiment), south of Nevel, December 1943

The 17th Guards was one of four Guards rifle divisions created in Kalinin Front on the same date (along with 20th, 21st and 22nd Guards) in recognition of their role in driving in the left flank of Army Group Center during the winter of 1941–42. When formed, its order of battle was as follows:

- 45th Guards Rifle Regiment from 421st Rifle Regiment
- 48th Guards Rifle Regiment from 634rd Rifle Regiment
- 52nd Guards Rifle Regiment from 920th Rifle Regiment
- 26th Guards Artillery Regiment from 349th Artillery Regiment
- 22nd Guards Antitank Battalion from 230th Antitank Battalion
- 16th Guards Sapper Battalion from 224th Sapper Battalion.

The division was part of 22nd Army when it was formed, and remained in Kalinin Front, in either that army or the 41st Army for the next year. In early 1943 it was transferred to 5th Guards Rifle Corps in 39th Army, and remained under those commands for the duration.

In late 1943 the division, along with the rest of 39th Army, was transferred to Western Front, and took part in the campaign to liberate Smolensk. The division was the first Soviet unit to enter the city of Dukhovshchina after it was abandoned by German XXVII Army Corps on the night of September 16/17 and received its name as an honorific.

During Operation Bagration the 17th Guards, now under 3rd Belorussian Front, advanced into the southern Baltic States. At the time of the German surrender the division was in East Prussia, near Königsberg. In the following months the entire 39th Army was shipped east across Siberia, and in August 1945, participated in the invasion of Japanese-occupied Manchuria as part of Transbaikal Front. By this time its towed anti-tank battalion had been replaced with a battalion of SU-76 self-propelled guns, but the divisional artillery had not been augmented as per the December 1944, Guards Rifle Division table of organization. During this campaign the division received a second honorific, Khinganskaya, for its efforts in driving through the Khingan Range.

When the war ended the division honorifics were – Russian: Духовщинско-Хинганская Краснознамённая ордена Суворова дивизия (English: Dukhovshchina, Khingan, Order of the Red Banner, Order of Suvorov), and five of its men had been named as Heroes of the Soviet Union.

Members of the division committed the notorious Gegenmiao massacre during the Manchuria Operation, torturing and killing thousands of Japanese civilians in August 1945.

== Postwar ==
Postwar, the division moved to Barabash, Primorsky Krai with the 39th Army from Port Arthur. The 39th Army disbanded in 1956 and the division became part of the 5th Army. On 17 May 1957, it became the 123rd Guards Motor Rifle Division. On 19 February 1962, the 319th Separate Equipment Maintenance and Recovery Battalion was activated. In May 1962, the 111th Separate Tank Battalion was formed. On 22 February 1968, the division was awarded the Order of the October Revolution. On 15 November 1972, the 392nd Separate Anti-Tank Artillery Battalion was activated. In 1980, the 1135th Separate Material Supply Battalion formed from the motor transport battalion. In 1989, the 111th Separate Tank Battalion disbanded.

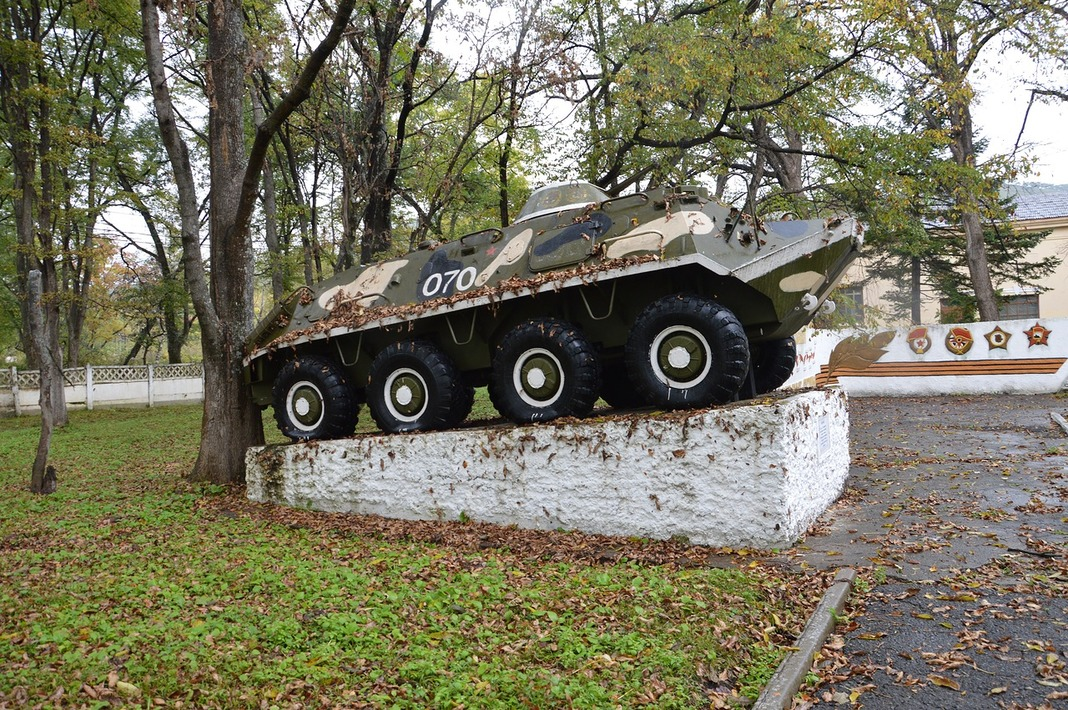
Division memorial in Barabash

On 1 October 1989, it became the 129th Guards Machine-Gun Artillery Division. The 45th Guards Motor Rifle Regiment disbanded and was replaced by the 290th Machine-Gun Artillery Regiment, the former 20th Fortified Area. The 52nd Guards Motor Rifle Regiment was disbanded and replaced by the 196th Machine-Gun Artillery Regiment, the former 4th Fortified Area. The 1170th Anti-Aircraft Artillery Regiment was disbanded and replaced by the 1133rd Anti-Aircraft Missile Regiment. The 48th Guards Motor Rifle Regiment and 1133rd Anti-Aircraft Missile Regiment transferred to the 40th Motor Rifle Division for Coastal Defence in October 1990. That division's 231st Motor Rifle Regiment and 1173rd Anti-Aircraft Missile Regiment became part of the 129th Guards Division. In September 2001, the division was converted into the 17th Guards Motor Rifle Division. In June 2009, it was downsized into the 70th Separate Guards Motor Rifle Brigade.

The brigade relocated to Ussuriysk in 2012, taking over the barracks of the former Ussuriysk Higher Military Automotive Command School of the Automotive Troops, disbanded in June 2007.

The 70th Separate Motor Rifle Brigade was reorganized as the 114th Guards Motor Rifle Regiment in 2018, becoming part of the reformed 127th Motor Rifle Division. The regiment inherited the honors of the brigade.
