= Fortress of War =

- Film poster
- Directed by: Alexander Kott
- Written by: Vladimir Yeryomin; Aleksey Dudarev; Konstantin Vorobyov; Ekaterina Tirdatova
- Produced by: Igor Ugolnikov; Ruben Dishdishyan; Vladimir Zametalin
- Starring: Aleksey Kopashov; Andrey Merzlikin; Pavel Derevyanko; Alexander Korshunov
- Narrated by: Ivan I. Krasko
- Cinematography: Vladimir Bashta
- Edited by: Mariya Sergeenkova
- Music by: Yury Krasavin
- Production companies: Belarusfilm; TRO Union; Mosfilm
- Distributed by: Central Partnership
- Release date: June 22, 2010
- Running time: 138 minutes
- Countries: Belarus, Russia
- Languages: Russian, Belarusian
- Budget: 253 million RUB
- Box office: $4,569,371

Fortress of War (festival title: The Brest Fortress; Russian: Брестская крепость, romanized: Brestskaya krepost, Belarusian: Брэсцкая крэпасць, romanized: Brestskaya krepasts' / Bresckaja krepasć) is a 2010 Russian-Belarusian war film recounting the June 1941 defense of Brest Fortress against invading Wehrmacht forces in the opening stages of Operation Barbarossa, Nazi Germany's invasion of the Soviet Union during World War II. Events are narrated from the perspective of 12-year-old Sasha Akimov, centering on three resistance zones holding out against the protracted German siege. The defending forces are led by regiment commander Major Pyotr Gavrilov (44th Rifle Regiment of the Red Army), with Regimental Commissar Yefim Fomin (84th Rifle Regiment of the Red Army), and the head of the 9th Frontier Outpost, Lieutenant Andrey Mitrofanovich Kizhevatov.

The film makers claim that the plot is as close as possible to historical fact, and that the Brest Fortress Museum supervised the plot thoroughly.

== Plot ==
The film opens on Saturday, 21 June 1941. Sasha Akimov, a 12-year-old musician, and his older brother, Andrey, whose parents were killed in the Spanish Civil War, are serving in the 333rd Rifle Regiment of the Red Army at the Brest Fortress. Elsewhere, a commissar, Yefim Fomin, discovers that he is unable to bring his family to Brest due to a shortage of train tickets. Another officer, Gavrilov, continues to express concern about the readiness of the fort's defences should an attack come, despite warnings from his friend, an officer of the NKVD Special Department, Lieutenant Vainshtein, about an imminent war with Germany. That evening, the fortress loses power due to sabotage by German Brandenburgers (commandos).

The next morning, at 3:58, German forces begin Operation Barbarossa, the invasion of the Soviet Union. The fortress is bombarded by German artillery and Stuka dive-bombers, killing many Soviet soldiers and civilians. At 6:30, German infantry attack the fortress, capturing hospital staff and patients and massacring many of them. Fomin takes command of the defenders around the Kholm Gate, while Gavrilov rallies the defenders around the Eastern Fort. Elsewhere, NKVD border guards under the command of Lieutenant Kizhevatov repel a German sortie into the fortress, and Vainshtein thwarts a German commando's attempt to undermine the defence of the 132nd Independent NKVD Convoy Battalion barracks. As the siege commences, Sasha finds himself stranded in one of the barracks. During the fighting for the East Fort, Junior Lieutenant Andrey Akimov (Sasha's brother) is killed while destroying two Panzer IIIs with a 45 mm anti-tank gun, helping Gavrilov repel a German attack.

By the end of 22 June, the Soviet defenders are divided into groups: one force under Fomin defending the Kholm Gate, a second force under Gavrilov defending the Eastern Redoubt, while Kizhevatov defends the 9th Frontier outpost along with a group of civilians, and Vainshtein holds on to the barracks of the 132nd NKVD Battalion. The next day, fighting continues for the fortress, and Sasha makes it to the Kholm Gate. A I-16 Soviet fighter aircraft of the 123rd Fighter Aviation Regiment is shot down over the fortress, and the pilot is rescued by Fomin's men. He reveals that the Red Army is retreating towards Minsk, and Fomin realises that the men must leave the fortress or die.

On 24 June, Sasha leaves the Kholm Gate to alert the other pockets about Fomin's plan for a breakout. While Sasha finds that the 132nd has been overrun and Vainshtein dead, he manages to deliver the message to Kizhevatov and Gavrilov. That night, a breakout is attempted by all three remaining groups but is driven back by the Germans, suffering many losses. The next morning, realising he cannot properly defend them, Kizhevatov reluctantly orders the surviving civilians (including his wife and daughter and also Sasha) to vacate the fortress during a ceasefire.

On 26 June, the Germans drop a two-ton bomb on the fortress, causing massive damage. The Germans quickly move to eradicate the surviving pockets. The defenders at the Kholm Gate are forced to surrender, and Fomin is immediately shot under the Commissar order by a German firing squad, as a Jew, a communist, and a commissar. Gavrilov orders his remaining men to attempt to break out individually. Kizhevatov and his surviving men manage to regroup in the barracks; Sasha returns to meet them there. After ordering Sasha to take the regimental colours and remember the truth about the defenders, Kizhevatov takes a machine gun to cover his men while they attempt a breakout. The breakout fails, and the remaining defenders, including Kizhevatov, are killed as Sasha manages to escape. Years later, an elderly Sasha pays tribute at the memorial of the Brest Fortress, accompanied by his grandson, to remember the good days and memories of the life before the Nazis took everything.

== Cast ==
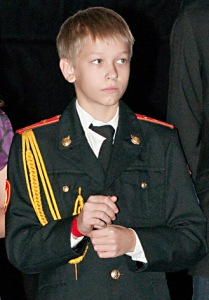
Aleksey Kopashov at the premiere of the film on November 3, 2010

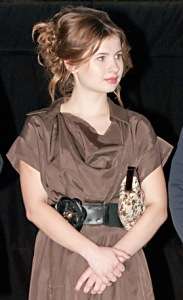
Anna Tsukanova-Kott at the premiere of the film on November 3, 2010

- Aleksey Kopashov as Alexander 'Sashka' Akimov
- Andrey Merzlikin as Lieutenant Andrey Kizhevatov
- Pavel Derevyanko as Regimental Commissar Yefim Fomin
- Alexander Korshunov as Major Pyotr Gavrilov
- Mikhail Pavlik as Lieutenant of the NKVD Vanshtein
- Kirill Boltaev as Lieutenant Anatoly Vinogradov
- Sergey Tsepov as Captain Ivan Zubachyov
- Benik Arakelyan as Starshina Samvel Matevosyan
- Yevgeny Tsyganov as Senior Political Officer Ivan Pochernikov
- Yana Esipovich as Katya Kizhevatova, Andrey Kizhevatov's wife
- Veranika Nikanava as Anya Kizhevatova, Andrey Kizhevatov's daughter
- Maksim Kostromykin as Nikolay ′Kolka′, projectionist
- Anna Tsukanova-Kott as Sonya

== Production ==
The film's score was composed by Yuri Krasavin.
