= Raïssa Koublitskaïa =

Soviet Belarusian politician (1928–2021)

- Раіса Кубліцкая
- Born: Raïssa Vladimirovna Koublitskaïa; 10 April 1928; Kałyški, Liozna District, Minsk Region, Byelorussian SSR
- Died: June 2021 (aged 93)
- Occupation: Agricultural worker
- Years active: 1948–1983
- Awards: Order of Lenin (x2); Medal "For the Capture of Königsberg"; Order of the Patriotic War, 2nd class; Hero of Socialist Labour

Raïssa Vladimirovna Koublitskaïa (Belarusian: Раіса Уладзіміраўна Кубліцкая; 10 April 1928 – June 2021) was a Soviet Belarusian agricultural worker and politician who was the head of the cultivation of flax at the Kalinin collective farm from 1948 to her retirement in 1983. She served during the Great Patriotic War and was an elected deputy of the Supreme Soviet of the Byelorussian Soviet Socialist Republic between 1967 and 1971. Koublitskaïa was twice the recipient of the Order of Lenin and also received the Medal "For the Capture of Königsberg", the Order of the Patriotic War, 2nd class and the Hero of Socialist Labour.

== Biography ==
On 10 April 1928, Koublitskaïa was born in the village of Kałyški, Liozna District, Minsk Region, Byelorussian SSR (today in Belarus). She was a graduate of the Kolyshansk Secondary School in the seventh grade in 1941. In October 1943, at the age of 15 1/2, Koublitskaïa began working as a volunteer worker in a military hospital and remained in the job until 1946, when she returned to Kolyshki. She took part in the Great Patriotic War in Lithuania, Poland, East Prussia from 1944. Following the conclusion of the war, Koublitskaïa decided to finish her studies. She graduated in 1947.

In 1948, Koublitskaïa began working as the head of the cultivation of flax at the Kalinin collective farm in the Liozno District, Minsk Region, Byelorussian SSR. She was the leader in a group of 12 women and all worked long hours with hand equipment and travelling to villages. From 1967 to 1971, Koublitskaïa served as an elected deputy of the Supreme Soviet of the Byelorussian Soviet Socialist Republic and also served at the regional and district Soviets of People's Deputies. From 1984, she chaired the department of women veterans of the Great Patriotic War at the Frunze regional veteran organization and was an honorary member of the Presidium of the veteran organization. Koublitskaïa retired in 1983.

== Personal life ==
She married fellow villager and combine operator Grigory and changed her surname to Koublitskaïa. They had no children. Koublitskaïa died in June 2021.

== Awards ==
On 9 June 1945, she received the Medal "For the Capture of Königsberg". Koublitskaïa received the Order of Lenin on 30 April 1966 "for high indications in the cultivation of flax" and again on 10 March 1976 with the title of Hero of Socialist Labour and the "Hammer and Sickle" gold medal "for growing flax".

She got the Order of the Patriotic War, 2nd class on 11 March 1985. The administration of the Frunzensky district of Minsk No. 433 awarded Koublitskaïa the title of Honorary Resident of the Frunzensky District of Minsk on 27 May 2008 as "one of the goals of this initiative is to pay tribute to people who have made a great contribution to the development of our country and to the upbringing of the younger generation." A portrait of her was unveiled on the Alley of Glory in the town of Liozna in July 2015. Koublitskaïa was made an Honorary Citizen of the Liozno District an April 2018 and was also an Honored Collective Farmer.
