= Ivan Zubachyov =

Soviet military personnel (1898–1944)

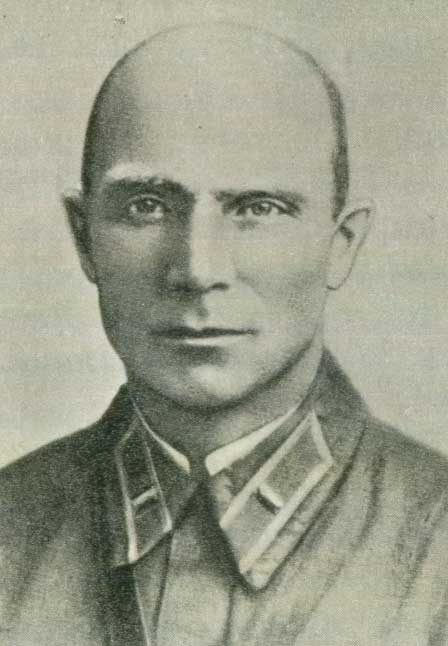
- Born: 28 February 1898; Zaraysky District, Ryazan Governorate, Russian Empire
- Died: 21 July 1944 (aged 46); Stalag XIII-C, Hammelburg, Germany
- Military career
- Allegiance: Soviet Union
- Conflicts: World War II; Defense of Brest Fortress

Ivan Nikolaevich Zubachyov (Russian: Иван Николаевич Зубачёв; 1898–1944) was a Soviet officer known for the defense of the Citadel of Brest Fortress.

== Biography ==
Ivan Zubachyov was born on February 28, 1898, in the village of Podlesnaya Sloboda, Zaraysky District, Ryazan Governorate, in a peasant family. He worked as a blacksmith at the Kolomna plant.

In 1918, he joined the Russian Communist Party (Bolsheviks), and served in the Red Army during the Russian Civil War and the Polish-Soviet War.

Zubachyov later served during the Winter War with the rank of captain and the post of commander of the battalion of the 44th regiment. The regiment from May 1941 was stationed at Brest Fortress. With the German attack on June 22, due to the fact that the regiment commander Pyotr Gavrilov was cut off with his detachment in the Kobryn fortification, Zubachyov led the defense on the site of the regiment. On June 24, at a meeting of senior officers, he was appointed commander of the consolidated defense group. His deputy was appointed regimental commissar Yefim Fomin. On this council, Zubachyov categorically spoke out against the plans for a breakthrough, believing that the Red Army would soon go on the counteroffensive, and that the garrison's task was to defend the fortress until reinforcements arrived.

He was taken prisoner along with the rest of the survivors after the fall of the citadel on June 26, and spent the rest of his life in German detention. He died in the prison camp Nürnberg-Langwasser (Stalag XIII D) on July 21, 1944.
