= Yefim Fomin =

Soviet political commissar (1909–1941)

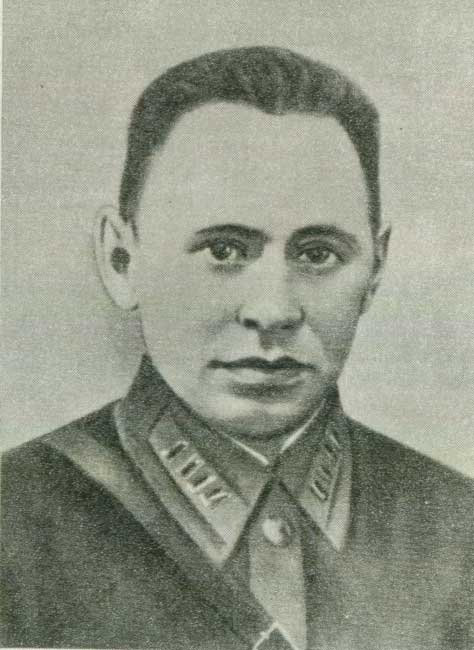
- Born: 15 January 1909; Kolyshki, Russian Empire
- Died: 26 June 1941 (aged 32); Brest, Byelorussian SSR, Soviet Union
- Cause of death: Execution by shooting
- Occupation: Political commissar
- Known for: Defense of Brest Fortress

Yefim Moiseyevich Fomin (Belarusian: Яўхім Майсеевіч Фамін, romanized: Yaukhim Maisieyevich Famin; Russian: Ефим Моисеевич Фомин; 15 January 1909 – 26 June 1941) was a Soviet political commissar. He is known for his part in the 1941 Defense of Brest Fortress, during which the German Army captured and immediately executed him.

== Early life ==
Fomin was born into a Jewish family in Kolyshki in Vitebsk Governorate (present-day Liozna Raion, Belarus) in 1909. He lost his parents as a young boy and was raised in orphanages. In 1924, Fomin joined the Komsomol, at the age of 15. He worked at a shoe factory in Vitebsk and then moved to Pskov. There, he was sent to the Communist Party school to prepare for a career as a professional party worker. In 1930, at the age of 21, while at the party school, Fomin became a member of the Soviet Communist Party. When he returned from the school, he was assigned to be a propagandist of the Pskov City Committee of the Communist Party.

== Army career ==
In 1932, the Party assigned Fomin to the Soviet Army, where he became a political commissar and began a nomadic life of the military: Pskov, Crimea, Kharkov, Moscow, and Latvia.

In August 1938, Fomin was designated as the divisional commissar of the 23rd (Kharkov) Rifle Division. In 1940, he served in Daugavpils, Latvia. However, in March 1941, he was demoted to a regimental commissar and assigned to the 84th Rifle Regiment of the 6th Rifle Division stationed in Brest.

On 21 June 1941, Fomin wanted to travel to Daugavpils to bring his family to Brest, but he failed to get a train ticket due to a big crowd of people at the railway station. On 22 June, Fomin was at the Brest Fortress, when the Wehrmacht started the war codenamed Operation Barbarossa. As the only higher commander present, he took over the command of the group of Soviet soldiers that defended the Kholm Gate.

The battle for the fortress continued for several days. Fomin moved to the northern part of the fortress' Central island where he was captured on 26 June 1941. Fomin was identified as a commissar and a Jew and due to the Commissar Order he was shot without delay, presumably, near the Kholm Gate.

== Posthumous honours ==
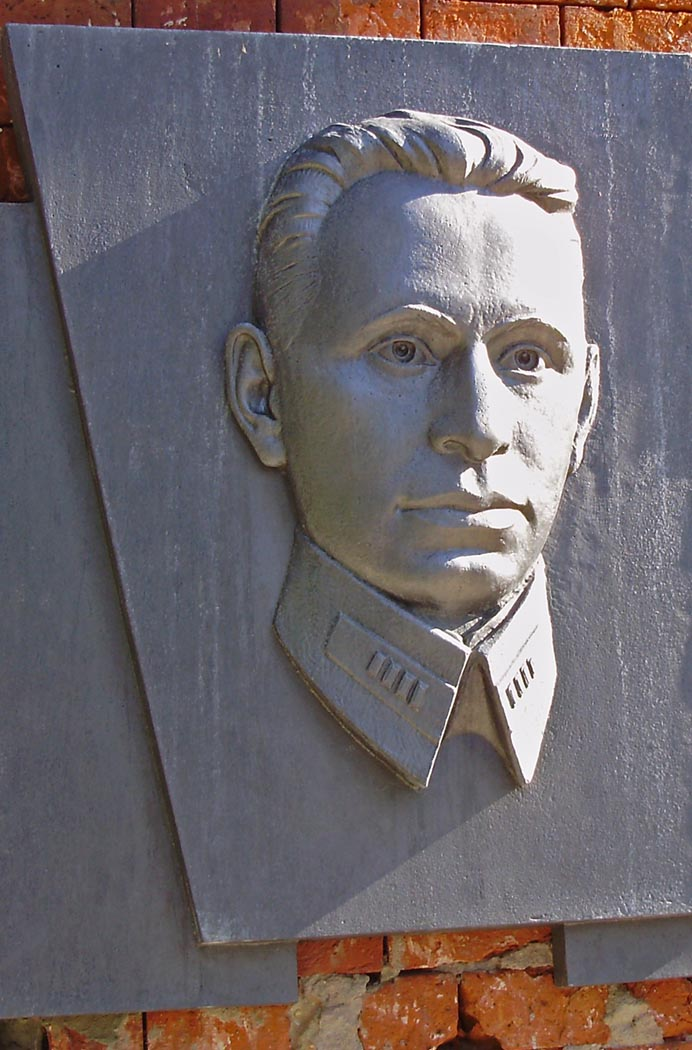
Fomin's memorial relief on the left side of the outside facade of the Kholm Gate in the Brest Fortress.

In January 1957, Fomin was posthumously awarded the Order of Lenin for his role in the defense of the Brest Fortress. In May 1991, at a reunion of veterans of the 6th Rifle Division, Fomin's demotion to regimental commissar was posthumously revoked and he was restored to the rank of divisional commissar.
