= St. John the Evangelist Church, Terespol =

Orthodox church in Terespol, Poland

Coordinates: 52°04′31.94″N 23°37′40.58″E

St. John the Evangelist Church
- Cerkiew św. Apostoła Jana Teologa
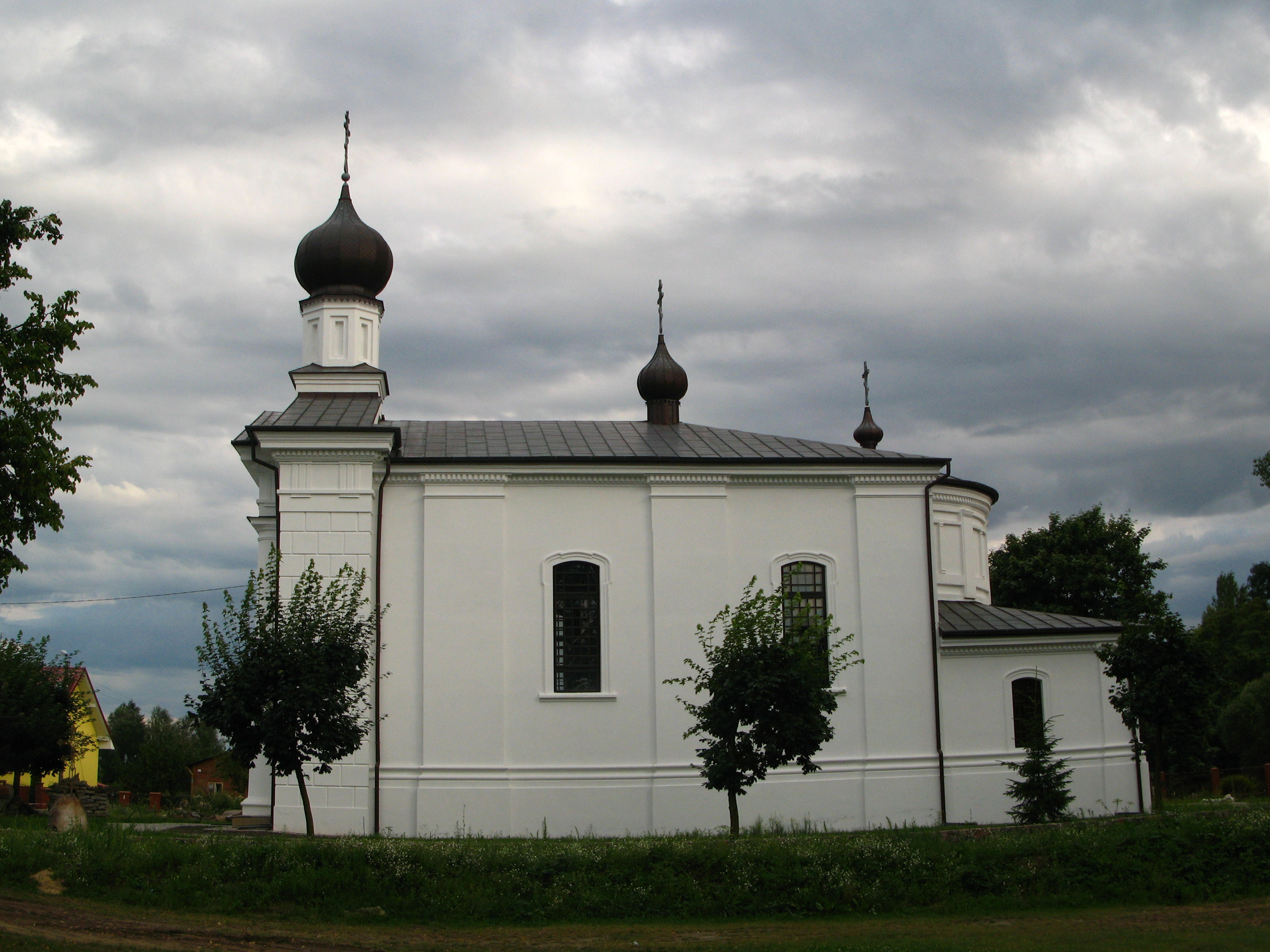
- St. John the Evangelist Church
- Location: Terespol
- Address: 2 Cerkiewna Street
- Country: Poland
- Denomination: Eastern Orthodoxy
- Previous denomination: Uniate (1745–about 1875); Eastern Orthodoxy (around 1875–1926); Neo-Uniate (1926–1941)
- Churchmanship: Polish Orthodox Church

History
- Status: active Orthodox Church
- Founder: Antoni Pociej
- Dedication: John the Evangelist

Architecture
- Style: Baroque
- Completed: 1745

Specifications
- Materials: brick

Administration
- Diocese: Diocese of Lublin and Chełm

The St. John the Evangelist Church is an Orthodox parish church in Terespol, Poland. It belongs to the Terespol Deanery of the Diocese of Lublin and Chełm of the Polish Orthodox Church. The temple is located in the eastern part of the city, at 2 Cerkiewna Street.

The church was built in the 18th century as a Uniate (Greek Catholic) church. Until the January Uprising, it was a strong center of the Uniate faith, and the local clergy were associated with the Polish independence movement. In 1875, due to the Conversion of Chełm Eparchy, the church in Terespol was transferred to the Russian Orthodox Church. Most of the faithful did not accept this decision and stopped attending the church altogether. After the change in denomination, the building was renovated twice – in 1881 and between 1897 and 1898. During the second renovation, a free-standing bell tower was erected next to the church, with a bell co-funded by Tsar Nicholas II, and new frescoes were created inside.

After Poland regained independence, reopening the church was not initially planned. In 1926, it was made available to the faithful as the seat of a Neo-Uniate parish. In 1941, it was once again transferred to the Orthodox Church and has remained active within its structures since then.

== History ==
=== Uniate church ===
According to various sources, the St. John the Evangelist Church in Terespol is either the second or third temple at this location. The exact time of the construction of the first temple has not been determined. According to Grzegorz Pelica, the currently existing church was built in 1745, funded by the local landowner Antoni Pociej as a Uniate church. The construction work was directed by Jan Jerzy Flemming. However, the Catalogue of Art Monuments in Poland indicates that this structure survived until the end of the 18th century and was then replaced by a new temple.

In the 19th century, the temple was renovated and rebuilt several times.

The church in Terespol was a significant Uniate center, and the priests serving there were associated with the Polish independence movement under Russian rule. The staffing of the parson position was influenced by the Pauline monastery in Terespol, which desired a clergy member sincerely devoted to the Uniate faith to lead the pastoral ministry. Father Eliasz Saykowicz, who served in Terespol from 1827 to 1831, supported the November Uprising, while Father Jerzy Koncewicz lost his parish in 1865 due to his involvement in the January Uprising. During the November Uprising, 785 faithful attended the Terespol church.

=== Orthodox church under Russian rule ===
As a result of the liquidation of the Uniate Chełm diocese, to which the Terespol parish belonged, the church was transferred to the Diocese of Chełm and Warsaw of the Russian Orthodox Church in 1875. In the years immediately preceding this event, the number of worshippers attending the church was estimated to be about 950. Most of them (almost 70%) reacted negatively to the abolition of the union and joined the group of so-called resisters – former Uniates who were formally Orthodox but in reality refused to participate in the rites of this faith, still identifying themselves with Catholicism.

Six years after the abolition of the union, the church in Terespol was renovated thanks to the efforts of Bishop Modest of Lublin (responsible for the former Uniate parishes). On 29 November 1881, Father Tymothy Sofronowicz, dean of the second deanery of Biała, re-consecrated the church. In 1892, Archbishop Flavian of Warsaw and Chełm conducted a canonical visitation of the Terespol church. Five years later, another renovation of the temple was carried out, completed in 1898. The renovation plan was developed by N. Fiodorov, an engineer of the Brest Fortress, and the new frescoes were painted by iconographers Afanasij Tulski and Aleksiej Lizunov, who were serving their military service in Brest at the time. The same authors created new icons for the church. The funds collected for the renovation (6,819 rubles and 37 kopecks) were more than sufficient, so they were used not only for the renovation of the church but also for the construction of a parish reading and writing school, which began operation in September 1898. At the end of that same month, the church, after the completed renovation, was re-consecrated. Due to the illness of the ordinary of the Warsaw diocese, Archbishop Jerome, the ceremonies were led by the superior of the St. Onuphrius Monastery in Jabłeczna, Archimandrite Herman. During the ceremonies, the church received a bell funded by Tsar Nicholas II, his mother Dowager Empress Maria Feodorovna, and Father John of Kronstadt. The bell was ceremoniously transported from the Terespol railway station by a Cossack detachment under the command of Yesaul Yeresienkov. The ceremony of hanging the bell on the renovated bell tower was attended by representatives of the Russian administrative and military authorities.

=== Church in independent Poland ===
==== Neo-Uniate church ====
After Poland regained its independence, the Ministry of Religious Affairs and Public Education did not include the Terespol church in its 1919 list of Orthodox sacred objects scheduled to be opened. In 1926, to prevent the church's closure, the local community agreed to join the Neo-Uniate Church. The local priest, Father Alexander Nikolski, also adopted Byzantine rite Catholicism, which had material motivations and was related to his poor theological and moral formation. Initially, 410 faithful attended the Neo-Uniate church in Terespol, but this number began to decline. By the turn of 1929 and 1930, there were only 350 left. Simultaneously, in 1931, the number of Orthodox faithful in Terespol who did not identify with the Neo-Uniate Church was estimated to be as high as 1,000 people. Only a few dozen from this group converted to Latin rite Catholicism.

==== Orthodox church ====
In 1941, the Orthodox parish in Terespol was reestablished within the Diocese of Chełm and Podlachia, and Father Alexander Nikolski, after a second conversion, became its parson again. According to another source, the Terespol church remained the seat of the Neo-Uniate parish until 1946, and Father Nikolski ceased pastoral activities in 1940, emigrated to Germany, and did not convert to Orthodoxy but remained a Catholic priest.

The church remained active until the end of World War II. In 1945, Bishop Tymothy of Lublin asked the new communist authorities to keep the Terespol church open as one of the seven Orthodox temples in the Lublin province. The church in Terespol was not closed and remained active even after the deportation of the Ukrainian Orthodox population during Operation Vistula. It belonged to the Biała deanery, where 1,490 faithful attended 4 churches in total. In 1969, the number of Orthodox believers in Terespol was estimated at 169.

At the beginning of the 21st century, the number of faithful attending the church was estimated at 120. In 2000, the roof was repaired. A new fence was built around the church, and the interior, the front façade, and the bell tower were renovated.

==== Icons exuding fragrant oil ====
Since 2010, the church in Terespol has become a special center of worship for the icon of the Mother of God "Quick to Hear". In September of that year, an icon belonging to one of the church's parishioners began to exude fragrant oil. The icon was displayed in the church in Terespol and quickly became a pilgrimage site for Orthodox Christians from Poland, Lithuania, Ukraine, and Belarus, as well as Catholics. Representatives of the Polish Orthodox Church assert that the event is miraculous but do not confirm whether the icon or the oil from it has caused healings (as some believers claim). Over the next two months, similar phenomena were observed on four other icons in the Terespol church: two icons of Mary and two depictions of synods of saints. One of the icons was given to the Monastery of the Protection of the Mother of God in Turkowice. After a year, the phenomenon persisted on two icons.

On 9 October 2011, a copy of the icon of the Mother of God "Quick to Hear", gifted to the parish by the Docheiariou monastery from Mount Athos, was placed in the church. The welcoming ceremonies and the installation of the icon in the church were attended by hierarchs of the Polish Orthodox Church – Metropolitan of Warsaw and all Poland, Sawa, Archbishop Abel of Lublin and Chełm, as well as hierarchs from the Belarusian Orthodox Church – Bishop John of Brest and Kobryn and Bishop Seraphim of Babruysk and Bykhaw.

== Architecture ==
The church is a historic monument, listed in the heritage registers on 4 April 1958 (relisted on 25 November 1966) under number A/77.

=== Building structure ===
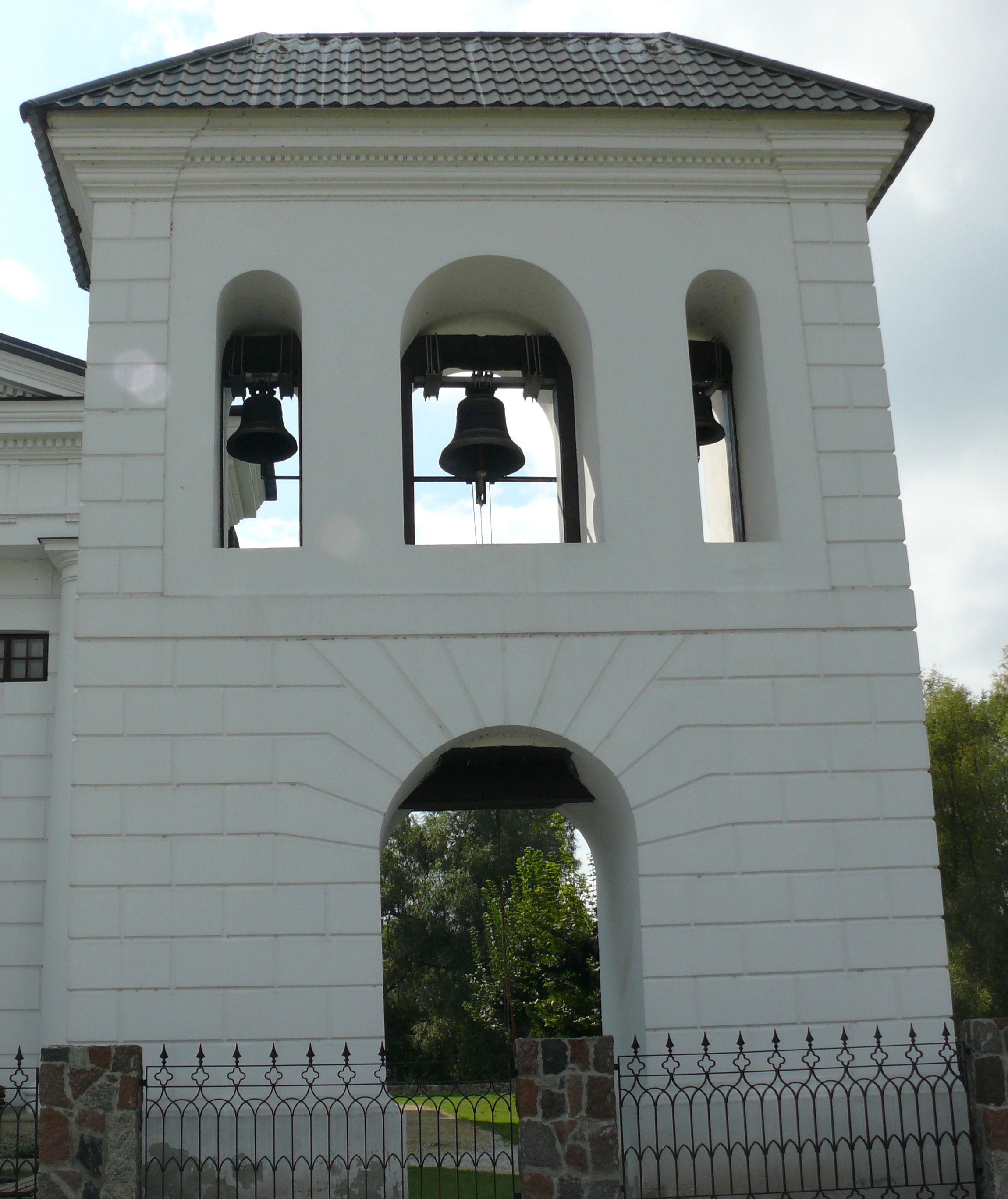
Free-standing bell tower near the church

Initially, the church was built in the Baroque style, but several 19th-century renovations transformed it into a Neoclassical building. The church is oriented, tripartite, and constructed on a rectangular plan from brick, which is plastered. The rectangular plan is complemented by two sacristies and a semicircular apse of the chancel. The nave of the church, with rounded corners, is the same height as the chancel. There is a matroneum inside the church.

The front elevation is slightly wider than the nave. It is adorned with a four-column Doric portico, topped with a triangular pediment. A section of the cornice conceals a rectangular portal and a round window. The gable of the church is crowned with a ridge turret featuring an onion-shaped dome. The side façades of the church are topped with a cornice with a simplified dentil frieze, divided by Tuscan pilasters, between which blind windows are placed. The church has a gable roof (over the nave) and a shed roof (over the sacristies), covered with metal sheets.

Adjacent to the church is a freestanding bell tower, which took its present form during the renovation at the end of the 19th century. It can accommodate three bells and is covered with a four-sided roof.

=== Interior ===
The side walls of the church are bossaged and additionally divided by Tuscan pilasters, ending with a simplified dentil frieze. The nave has a wooden ceiling with a facet, while both sacristies have flat ceilings.

The church's interior features a 19th-century set of frescoes by Tulski and Lizunov. Behind the altar, they placed a larger-than-life figure of the Lord in Glory, surrounded by Christ the Savior, St. Basil of Caesarea, St. Gregory of Nazianzus, St. John Chrysostom, Saints Cyril and Methodius, and St. Vladimir the Great. In the nave, on the side walls of the church, the Russian iconographers depicted the Four Evangelists and scenes of the Crucifixion and Resurrection.

In 2005, the church's iconostasis was replaced with a modern structure made between 2004 and 2005 by Mikhail Kotsky from Lutsk. The older, historic iconostasis was transferred to the newly built Church of St. Mary Magdalene in Puławy.

In the side icon cases, there is an icon of St. Alexander Nevsky, placed in the church by Captain F. Charkiewicz, head of the Russian garrison in Terespol, to commemorate the Russian victory in the Battle of Brest during the Kościuszko Uprising. Alexander Nevsky was the patron of General Alexander Suvorov, who commanded the Russian forces in that battle. Other historic icons in the church include a copy of the Black Madonna of Częstochowa painted on a mirror, a 19th-century icon of the Mother of God in a silvered dress, images of St. Theodosius of Kiev, St. Alexandra, St. Anthony of Kiev, St. Stephen, St. Nicholas, St. Joannicius, and the Archangel writing a book. Other elements of the church's equipment were funded by parishioners. In 1905, the St. Petersburg official Nikolayev donated a three-candle chandelier, three candle holders, a censer, three silk veils, wax candles, and a copy of the Theotokos of Tikhvin with an icon case, an eternal lamp, and a supply of oil for it. From the same period (early 20th century) comes a liturgical chalice and Golgotha, while at the end of the previous century, the Lord's Grave with the Epitaphios, as well as feretory with the figures of St. George and the Mother of God, St. John the Evangelist, and the Holy Family and a processional cross were made. A much older Baroque crucifix was made at the turn of the 18th and 19th centuries.

In October 2015, a reliquary containing the relics of St. Andrew the Apostle, St. Lazarus of Bethany, and St. Martyr Charlamp was placed in the church, brought from Belarus.

== Bibliography ==
- Pelica, Grzegorz Jacek (2007). Kościół prawosławny w województwie lubelskim (1918–1939) (in Polish). Lublin: Fundacja Dialog Narodów. ISBN 978-83-925882-0-7.
- Wysocki, J. (2011). Ukraińcy na Lubelszczyźnie w latach 1944–1956 (in Polish). Lublin: Instytut Pamięci Narodowej. ISBN 978-83-7629-260-1.
