= Kholm Gate =

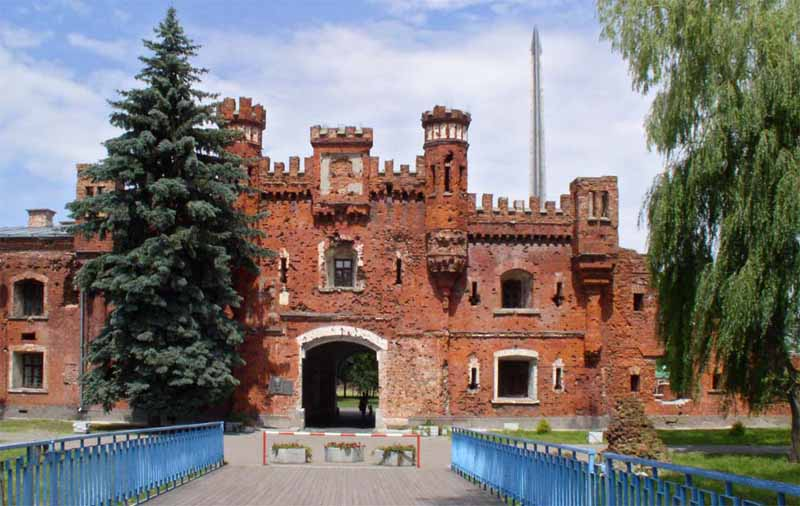
- The exterior facade of the Kholm Gate, with damage from World War II still visible

General information
- Type: gatehouse
- Classification: fortification
- Location: Brest Fortress, Brest, Belarus
- Coordinates: 52.0812262°N 23.6564016°E
- Completed: 1847

The Kholm Gate (Russian: Холмские ворота, Belarusian: Холмская брама) is a gate of the citadel of Brest Fortress in Brest, Belarus. Originally built in the 19th century during Russian rule, as one of the four fortified gatehouses, leading into the Citadel of the Russian Brest Fortress. The exterior facade, facing the southern branch of the Mukhavets River, was designed in a classical style decorated with turrets and a medallion. The Kholm Gate was named after the town of Chełm, which was directly connected to the gate by a road, with Kholm being the East Slavic version of the town's name. In June 1941, Brest Fortress was the site of heavy fighting during the Defense of Brest Fortress, early into the German invasion of the Soviet Union during World War II. Kholm Gate's facade was badly damaged, but survived relatively intact compared to the rest of the fortress and is one of the two surviving gates, along with the Terespol Gate.

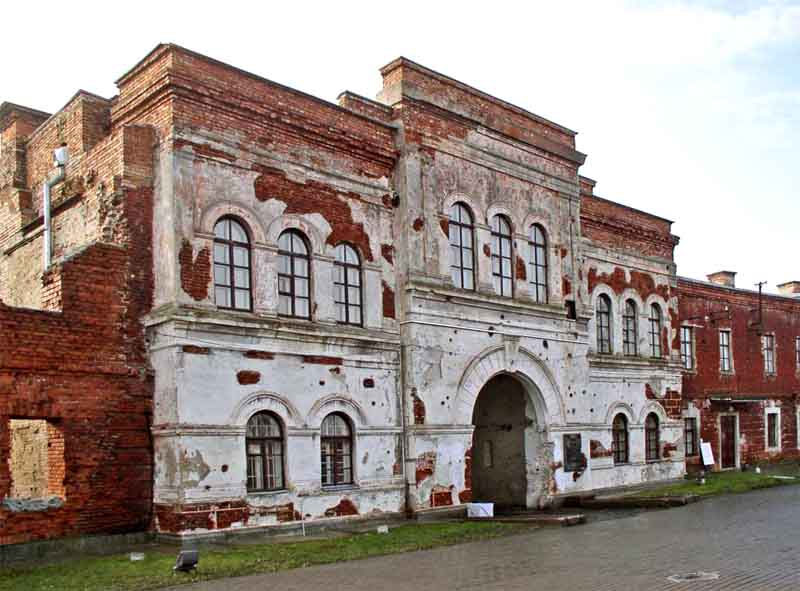
The interior facade of the Kholm Gate.

== Books ==
- В. Бешанов. Бресткая крепость". Минск: Беларусь, 2004, ISBN 985-01-0428-7
