= Kalyshki =

Village in Vitebsk Region, Belarus

Kalyshki Калышкі (Belarusian) Kolyshki
- Village
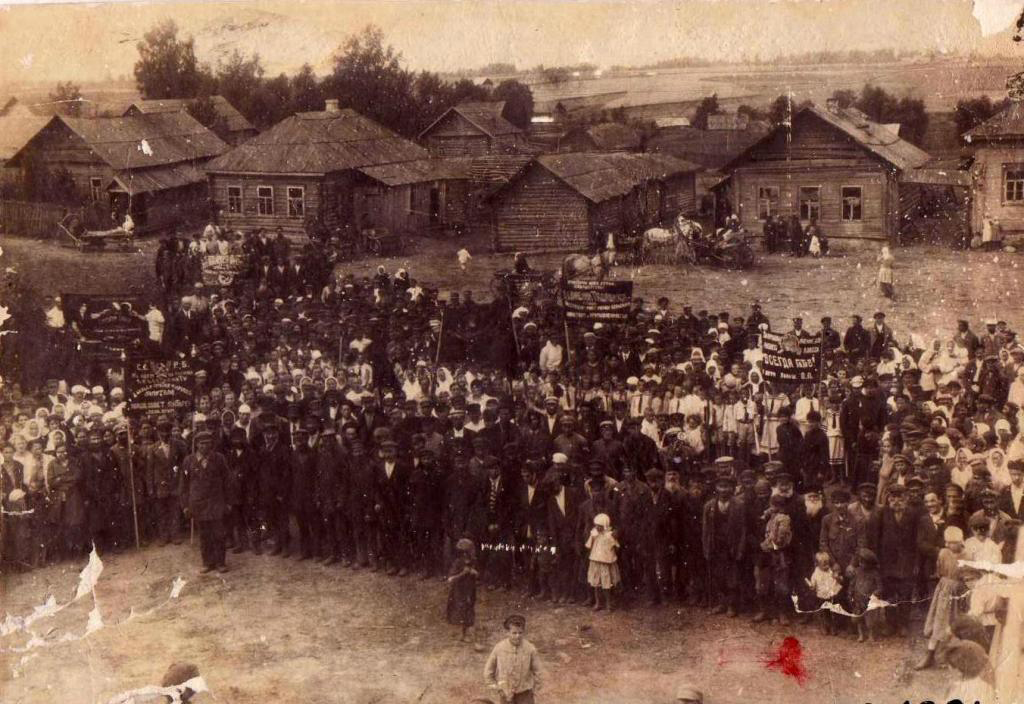
- Kalyshki Market in 1921

- Location within Belarus
- Coordinates: 55°9′59″N 30°57′31″E
- Country: Belarus
- Region: Vitebsk Region
- District: Lyozna District

Population (2010)
  - Total: 73
- Time zone: UTC+3 (MSK)
- Area code: +375 2138
- License plate: 2

Kalyshki or Kolyshki (Note: Belarusian: Калышкі, romanized: Kalyški; Russian: Колышки; Yiddish: קאליסק, romanized: Kalisk)) is a village in Lyozna District, Vitebsk Region, Belarus. It is located near the border with Russia.

== Notable people ==
- Avraham Kalisker (1741–1810), rabbi and Hasidic leader
- Yefim Fomin (1909–1941), Soviet political commissar
