= Terespol =

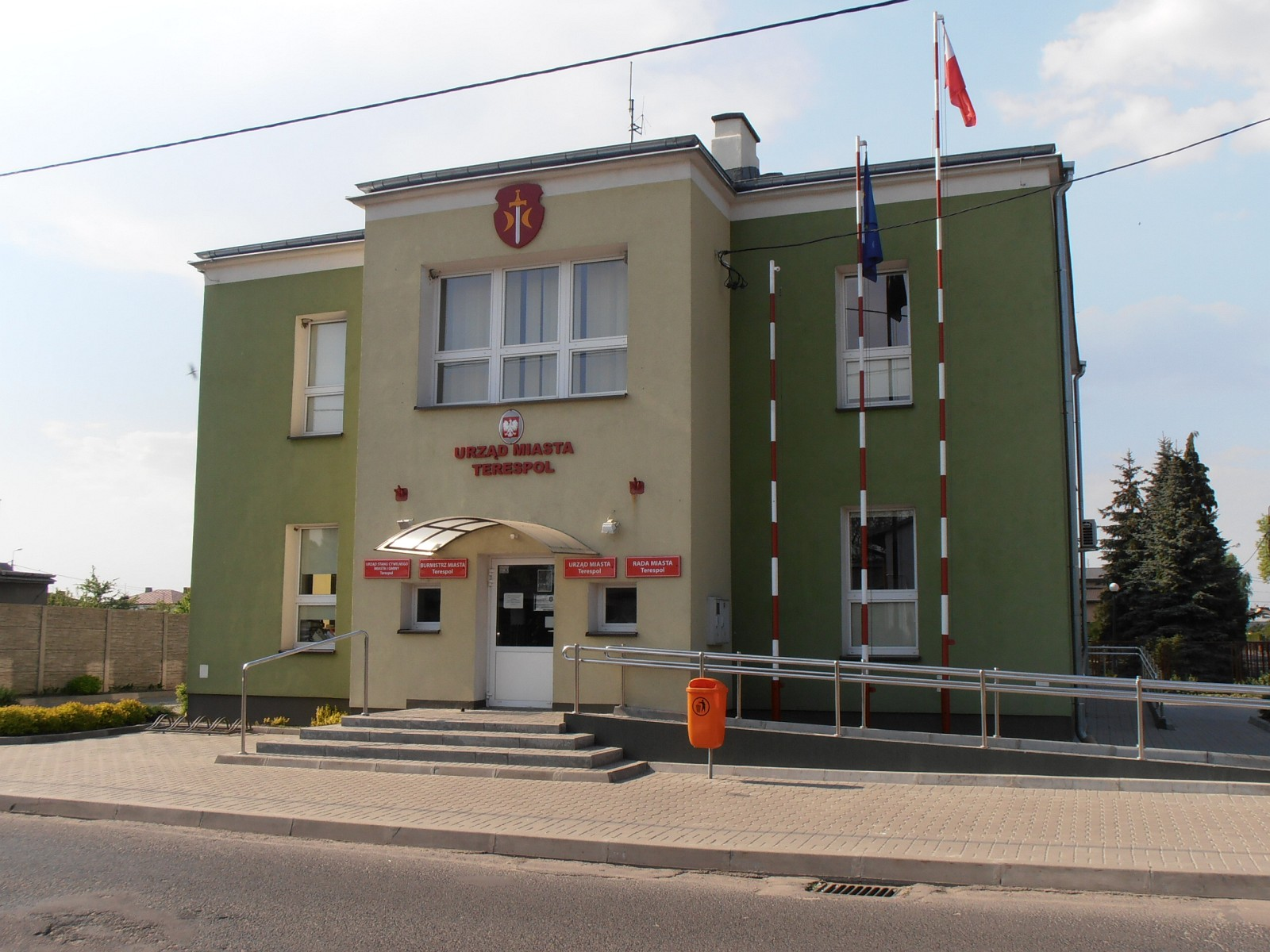
- Terespol local government building

- Coat of arms
- Interactive map of Terespol
- Location within Poland
- Coordinates: 52°4′35.87″N 23°36′57.86″E
- Country: Poland
- Voivodeship: Lublin Voivodeship
- County: Biała
- Gmina: Terespol (urban gmina)

Government
  - Mayor: Jacek Danieluk

Area
  - Total: 10.11 km^{2} (3.90 sq mi)

Population (2014)
  - Total: 5,794
  - Density: 573.1/km^{2} (1,484/sq mi)
- Time zone: UTC+1 (CET)
  - Summer (DST): UTC+2 (CEST)
- Postal code: 21–550
- Area code: +48 83
- Car plates: LBI
- Website: www.terespol.pl

Terespol (Polish: [tɛˈrɛspɔl]; Belarusian: Тэрэ́спаль, romanized: Teréspaĺ) is a border town in eastern Poland on the border with Belarus. It lies on the border river Bug, directly opposite the city of Brest, Belarus. It has 5,794 inhabitants as of 2014.

== Overview ==
Since 1999 Terespol has been within Biała County in Lublin Voivodeship. Between 1975 and 1998 it belonged to Biała Podlaska Voivodeship. The town is a busy border crossing between Poland and Belarus on the European route E30 which links Berlin-Warsaw-Minsk-Moscow. Another crossing into Brest is located at Kukuryki northwest of Terespol. a local train used to run between Brest and Terespol. Due to the COVID-19 pandemic, the train was cancelled at the beginning of 2020 and has been suspended for an indefinite period.

Terespol features in a novel by the Yiddish Nobel Prize-winning writer Isaac Bashevis Singer, The Family Moskat (1950), in which the young protagonist, Asa Heshel Bennet, comes to Warsaw from his hometown of Terespol Minor to study.

== History ==
The town of Terespol is located in the spot of a village called Błotków or Błotkowo, which existed in the 16th–17th centuries. In 1512, this area became property of a nobleman called Iwan Sapieha of Kodeń. Later it belonged to the Hornostaj and Dorohostajski families. Administratively it was within the Grand Duchy of Lithuania, part of the Podlaskie Voivodeship until 1566, and the Brest Litovsk Voivodeship afterwards until the Partitions.

=== 17th century ===
In 1609, King Sigismund III Vasa built here a spacious palace with a vast garden. Due to proximity to the city of Brest, the settlement prospered. During the Deluge (1655–1660), Błotków together with the palace were ransacked and burned to the ground by Swedish soldiers.

In the second half of the 17th century, Błotków with its ruined palace was purchased by Castellan of Vilnius Józef Bogusław Słuszka, who founded here a town, named Terespol after his wife, Teresa née Gosiewska. In 1697, Holy Trinity church was built here, soon afterwards, Dominican friars settled in Terespol.

=== 18th century ===
In 1748, Terespol became property of Grand Treasurer of Lithuania Georg Detlev von Flemming, who made great contribution to the development of the town, draining local swamps and building a number of dykes and canals. Furthermore, Flemming introduced a number of German settlers, and built a manor house in the location of the destroyed royal castle. In 1757, one weekly and two one-day annual fairs were established. In 1764, Terespol was ransacked by the private army of magnate Karol Stanisław Radziwiłł, who waged a personal war with Flemming for his support of the Czartoryski family. Later on the town passed to the Czartoryski family.

Historical population
| Year | Pop. | ±% |
|---|---|---|
| 1897 | 4,107 | — |
| 1910 | 3,487 | −15.1% |
| 1921 | 1,919 | −45.0% |
| 1931 | 2,308 | +20.3% |
| 1939 | 2,570 | +11.4% |
| 1950 | 3,416 | +32.9% |
| 1960 | 3,832 | +12.2% |
| 2010 | 5,901 | +54.0% |

After the Third Partition of Poland–Lithuania (1795) Terespol briefly belonged to the Habsburg Empire.

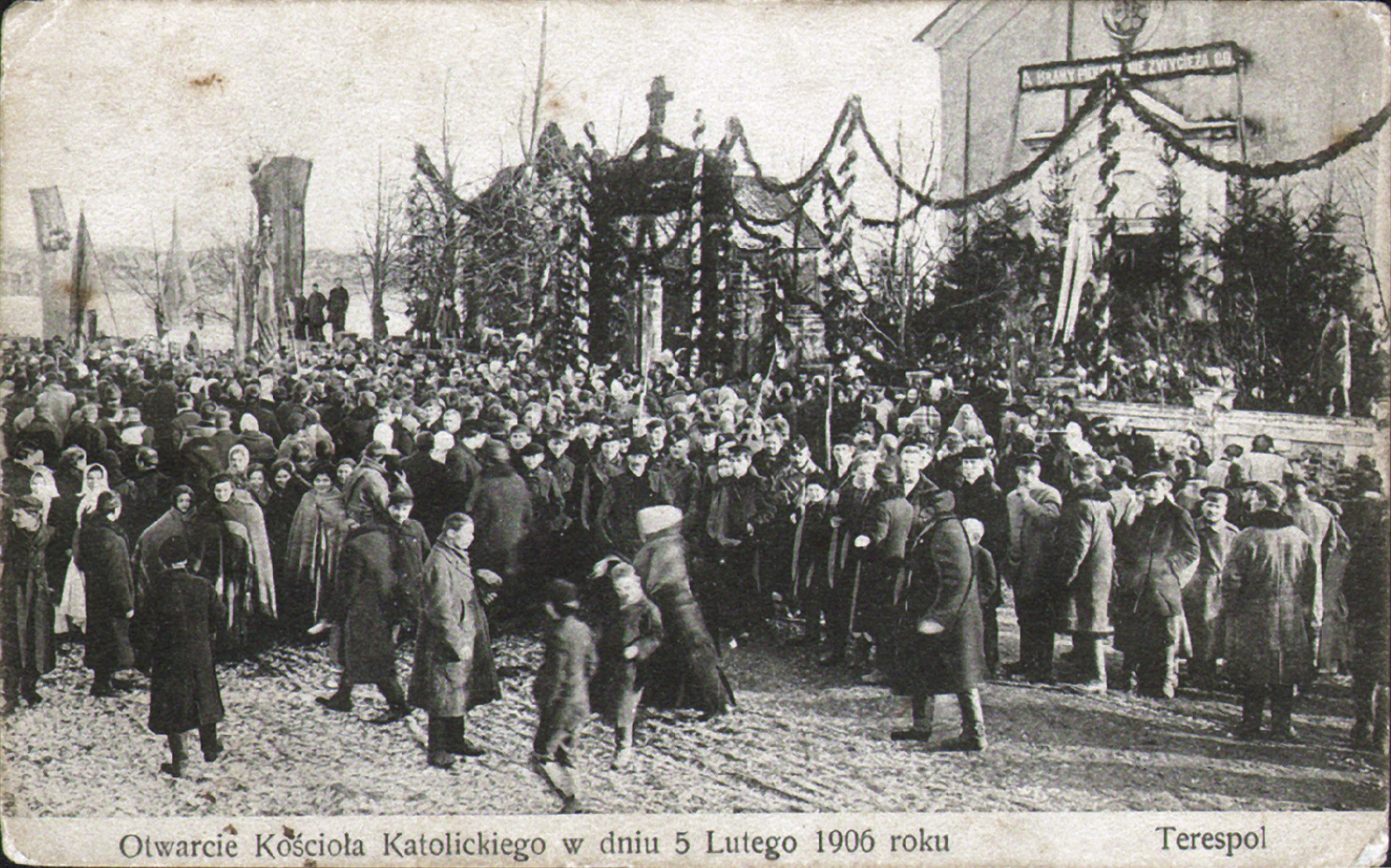
Opening of a new Catholic church in Terespol in 1906

=== 19th century ===
After the Polish victory in the Austro-Polish War of 1809, it was part of the Polish Duchy of Warsaw, and from 1815 to 1915, it belonged to Russian-controlled Congress Poland. The town burned in several fires, but continued to prosper, due to the construction of a highway from Warsaw to Brest (1819–1823). After the November Uprising, Terespol belonged to the Russian Imperial government. In 1855, due to the construction of Brest Fortress, Terespol was moved westwards, and all buildings in the old town were destroyed for military purposes. In 1867, a railroad to Warsaw was completed; in 1870, it was extended to Brest. As a result of Russian discriminatory regulations the town saw a large influx of Jews, who then became the town's largest ethnic group.

=== 20th century ===
In 1915, all residents living within 30 kilometres (19 miles) from the fortress were forcibly resettled into Russia, and during the evacuation, the town was ransacked and burned. Terespol was reintegrated with Poland, after the country regained independence in 1918. In the Second Polish Republic Terespol was part of the Lublin Voivodeship.

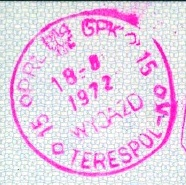
Old communist-era passport exit stamp from Terespol into Brest

During World War II Terespol was briefly occupied by the Soviets in September 1939, and then by Nazi Germany from 1939 to 1944. During the occupation, most Jews were murdered in the Holocaust. The Germans also established a transit camp for Polish prisoners of war in Terespol. Terespol became a border town after the Soviet Union annexed former eastern territories of Poland.

== Climate ==
Terespol has an oceanic climate (Köppen climate classification: Cfb) using the −3 °C (27 °F) isotherm or a humid continental climate (Köppen climate classification: Dfb) using the 0 °C (32 °F) isotherm.

Climate data for Terespol (1991–2020 normals, extremes 1955–present)
| Month | Jan | Feb | Mar | Apr | May | Jun | Jul | Aug | Sep | Oct | Nov | Dec | Year |
|---|---|---|---|---|---|---|---|---|---|---|---|---|---|
| Record high °C (°F) | 11.6 (52.9) | 16.8 (62.2) | 22.3 (72.1) | 30.3 (86.5) | 32.0 (89.6) | 34.4 (93.9) | 36.2 (97.2) | 36.2 (97.2) | 34.5 (94.1) | 26.3 (79.3) | 19.1 (66.4) | 14.5 (58.1) | 36.2 (97.2) |
| Mean daily maximum °C (°F) | 0.1 (32.2) | 1.7 (35.1) | 6.9 (44.4) | 14.3 (57.7) | 19.9 (67.8) | 23.1 (73.6) | 25.2 (77.4) | 24.7 (76.5) | 19.0 (66.2) | 12.6 (54.7) | 6.0 (42.8) | 1.5 (34.7) | 12.9 (55.2) |
| Daily mean °C (°F) | −2.4 (27.7) | −1.4 (29.5) | 2.5 (36.5) | 8.9 (48.0) | 14.0 (57.2) | 17.3 (63.1) | 19.3 (66.7) | 18.5 (65.3) | 13.4 (56.1) | 8.1 (46.6) | 3.2 (37.8) | −0.9 (30.4) | 8.4 (47.1) |
| Mean daily minimum °C (°F) | −5.0 (23.0) | −4.3 (24.3) | −1.4 (29.5) | 3.5 (38.3) | 8.2 (46.8) | 11.4 (52.5) | 13.5 (56.3) | 12.4 (54.3) | 8.3 (46.9) | 4.2 (39.6) | 0.7 (33.3) | −3.4 (25.9) | 4.0 (39.2) |
| Record low °C (°F) | −34.3 (−29.7) | −29.1 (−20.4) | −24.5 (−12.1) | −6.4 (20.5) | −3.0 (26.6) | −0.2 (31.6) | 3.6 (38.5) | 1.3 (34.3) | −4.1 (24.6) | −9.9 (14.2) | −20.0 (−4.0) | −26.4 (−15.5) | −34.3 (−29.7) |
| Average precipitation mm (inches) | 29.9 (1.18) | 27.3 (1.07) | 30.0 (1.18) | 36.1 (1.42) | 60.5 (2.38) | 43.0 (1.69) | 34.0 (1.34) | 37.7 (1.48) | 52.8 (2.08) | 37.8 (1.49) | 33.2 (1.31) | 32.6 (1.28) | 455.0 (17.91) |
| Average extreme snow depth cm (inches) | 8.0 (3.1) | 9.1 (3.6) | 6.1 (2.4) | 1.3 (0.5) | 0.0 (0.0) | 0.0 (0.0) | 0.0 (0.0) | 0.0 (0.0) | 0.0 (0.0) | 0.3 (0.1) | 3.7 (1.5) | 5.6 (2.2) | 9.1 (3.6) |
| Average precipitation days (≥ 0.1 mm) | 16.57 | 14.98 | 14.33 | 11.50 | 12.97 | 13.10 | 13.93 | 10.60 | 12.03 | 13.10 | 14.87 | 16.67 | 164.64 |
| Average snowy days (≥ 0 cm) | 18.1 | 16.7 | 8.6 | 0.9 | 0.0 | 0.0 | 0.0 | 0.0 | 0.0 | 0.3 | 4.8 | 13.5 | 62.9 |
| Average relative humidity (%) | 86.9 | 84.0 | 77.0 | 69.1 | 70.7 | 72.4 | 73.8 | 74.2 | 79.8 | 83.2 | 88.0 | 88.8 | 79.0 |
| Mean monthly sunshine hours | 43.2 | 64.1 | 128.0 | 192.8 | 260.7 | 270.4 | 271.9 | 264.6 | 170.0 | 110.2 | 48.4 | 35.9 | 1,860.2 |
Source 1: Institute of Meteorology and Water Management
Source 2: Meteomodel.pl (records, relative humidity 1991–2020)

== Sights ==
Around Terespol one can find some of the old fortifications that were once part of the Brest Fortress. In Terespol there is a former powder magazine of the fortress. Other sights include the 19th-century monument to the construction of the highway connecting Warsaw with nearby Brest, and modern monuments: the Independence Monument and the Tadeusz Kościuszko monument.

== International relations ==
=== Twin towns – Sister cities ===
Terespol is twinned with:

- Brest in Belarus

== Gallery ==
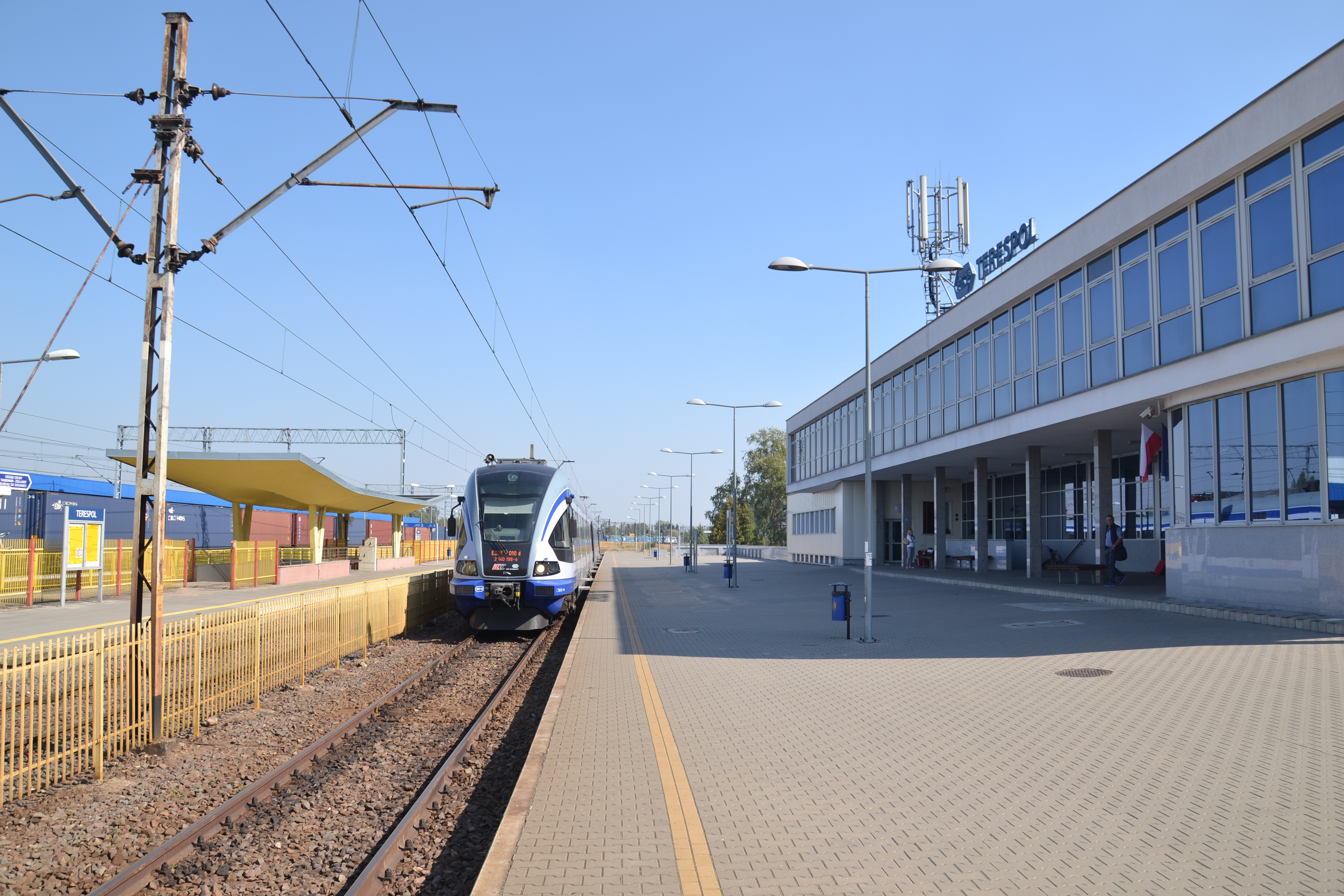
Train station in Terespol

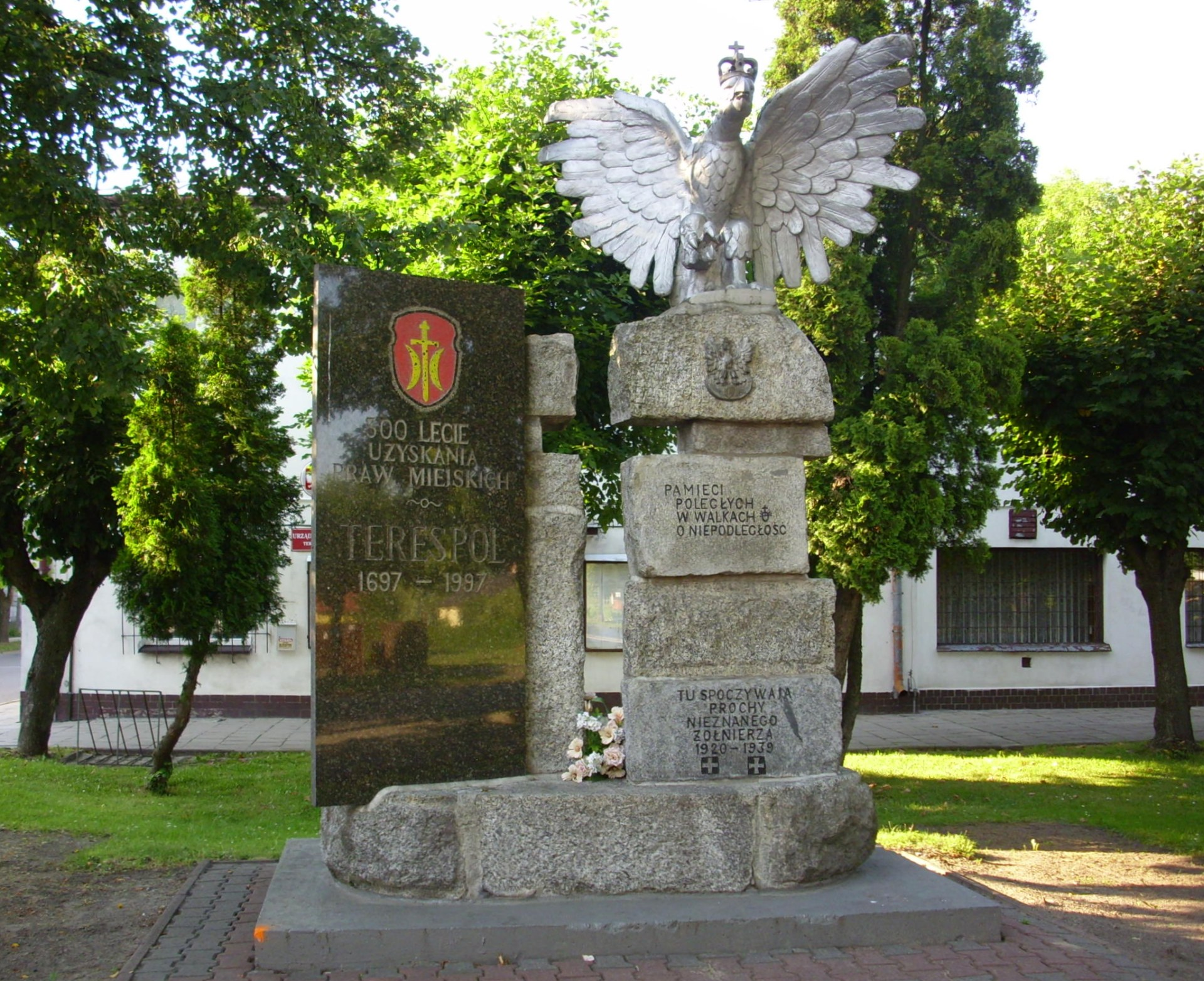
Independence Monument

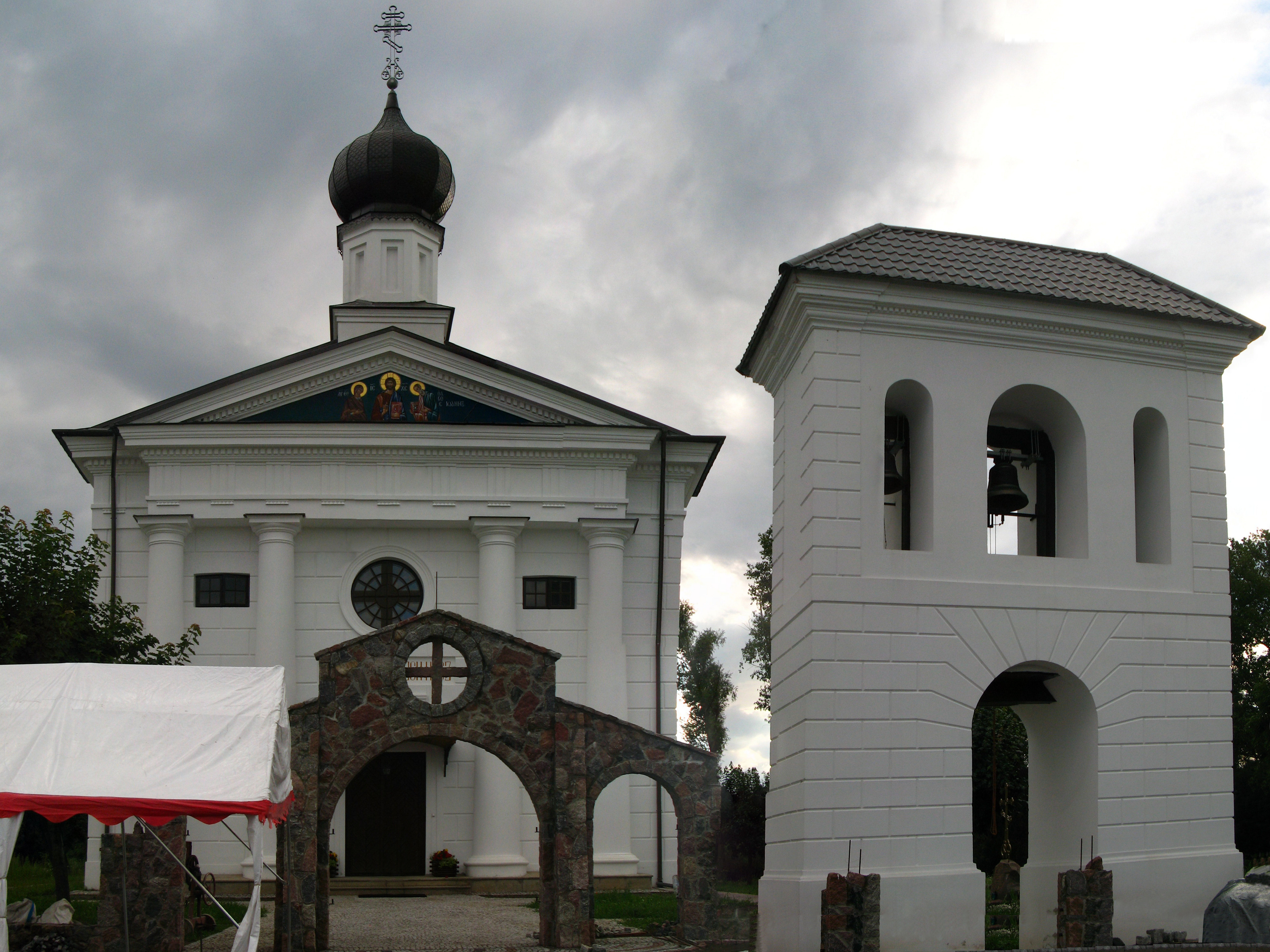
Eastern Orthodox church of St. John the Evangelist

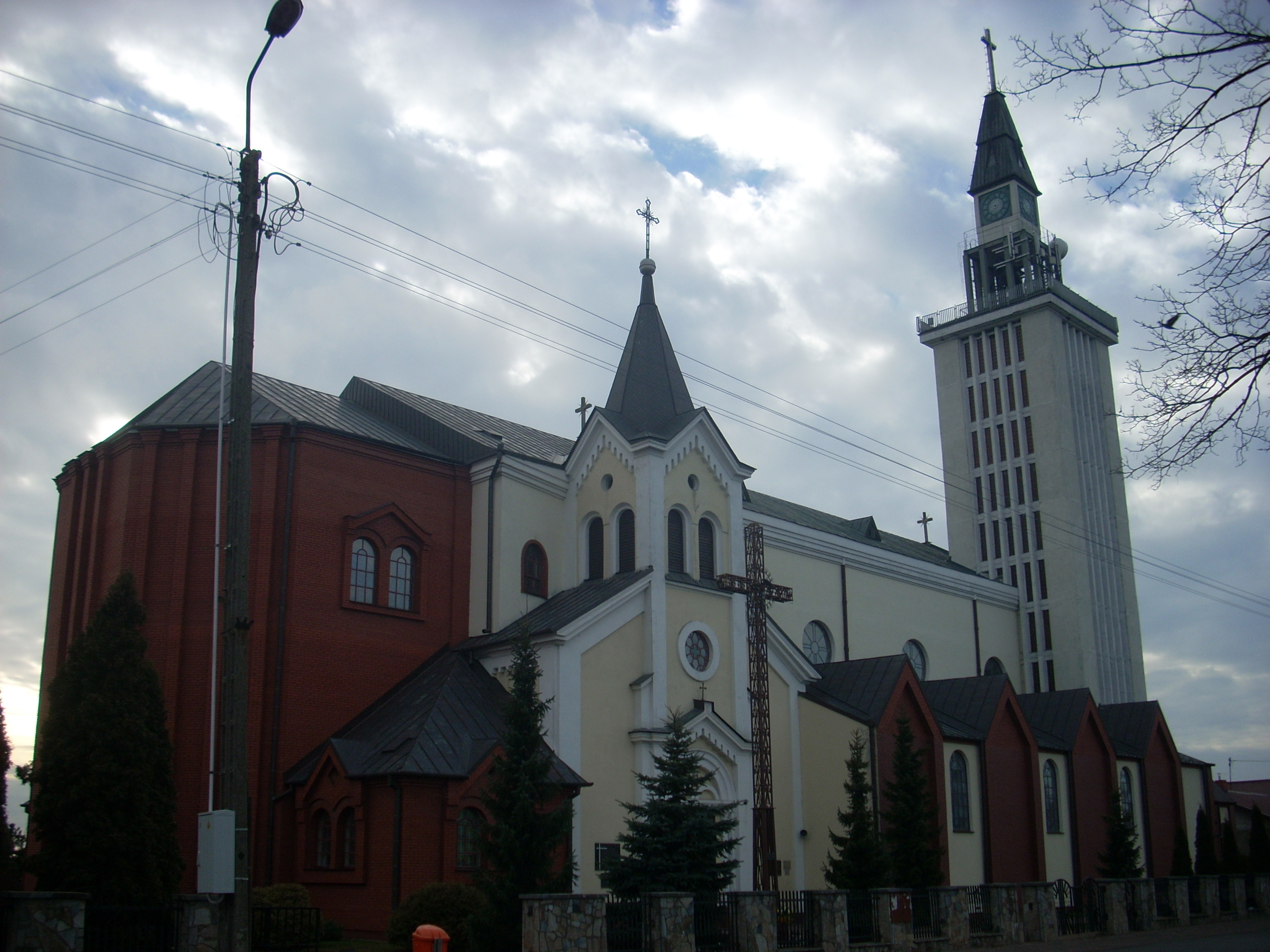
Catholic church of the Holy Trinity

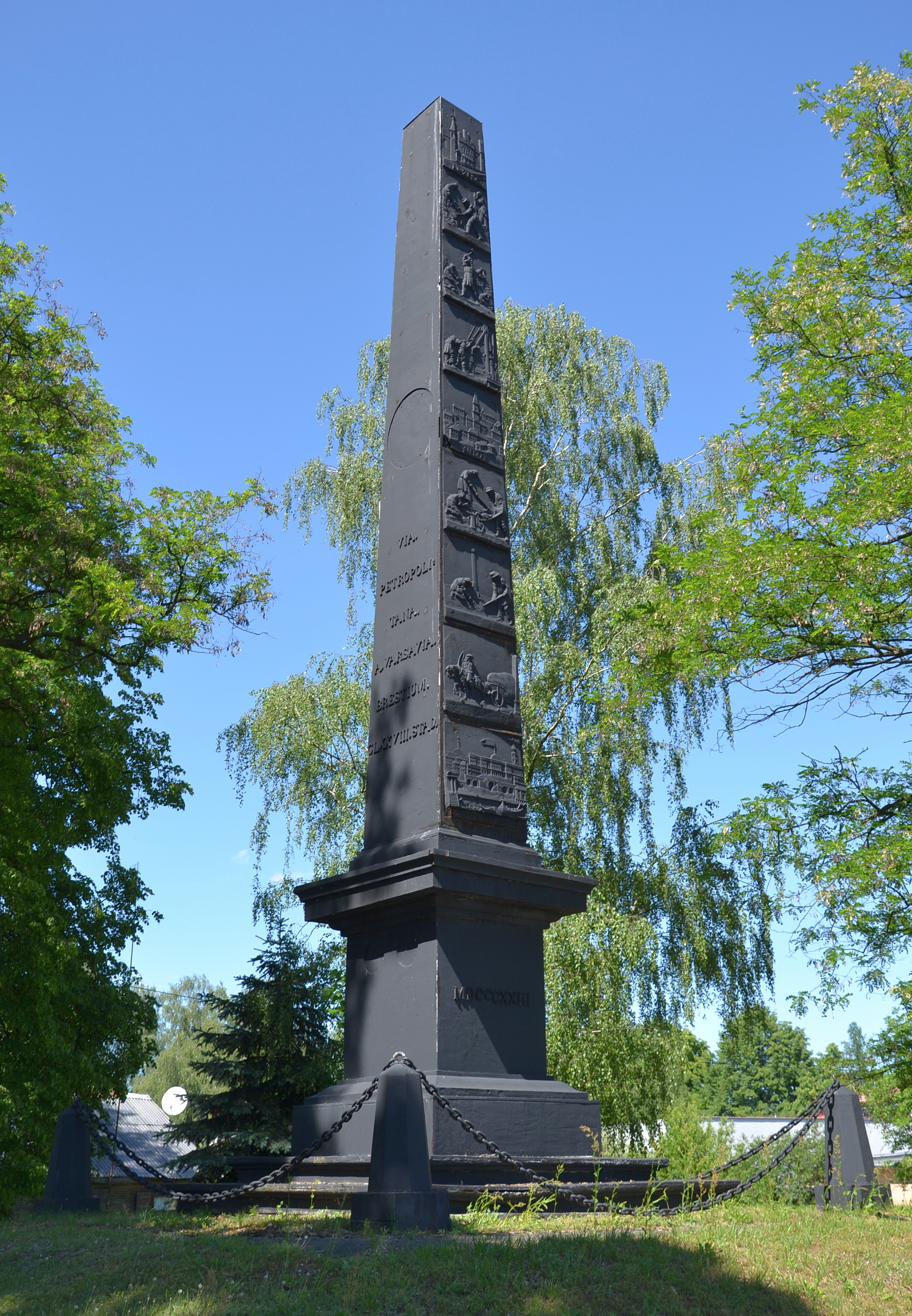
Monument to the construction of the Brest Highway (from Warsaw to Brest)

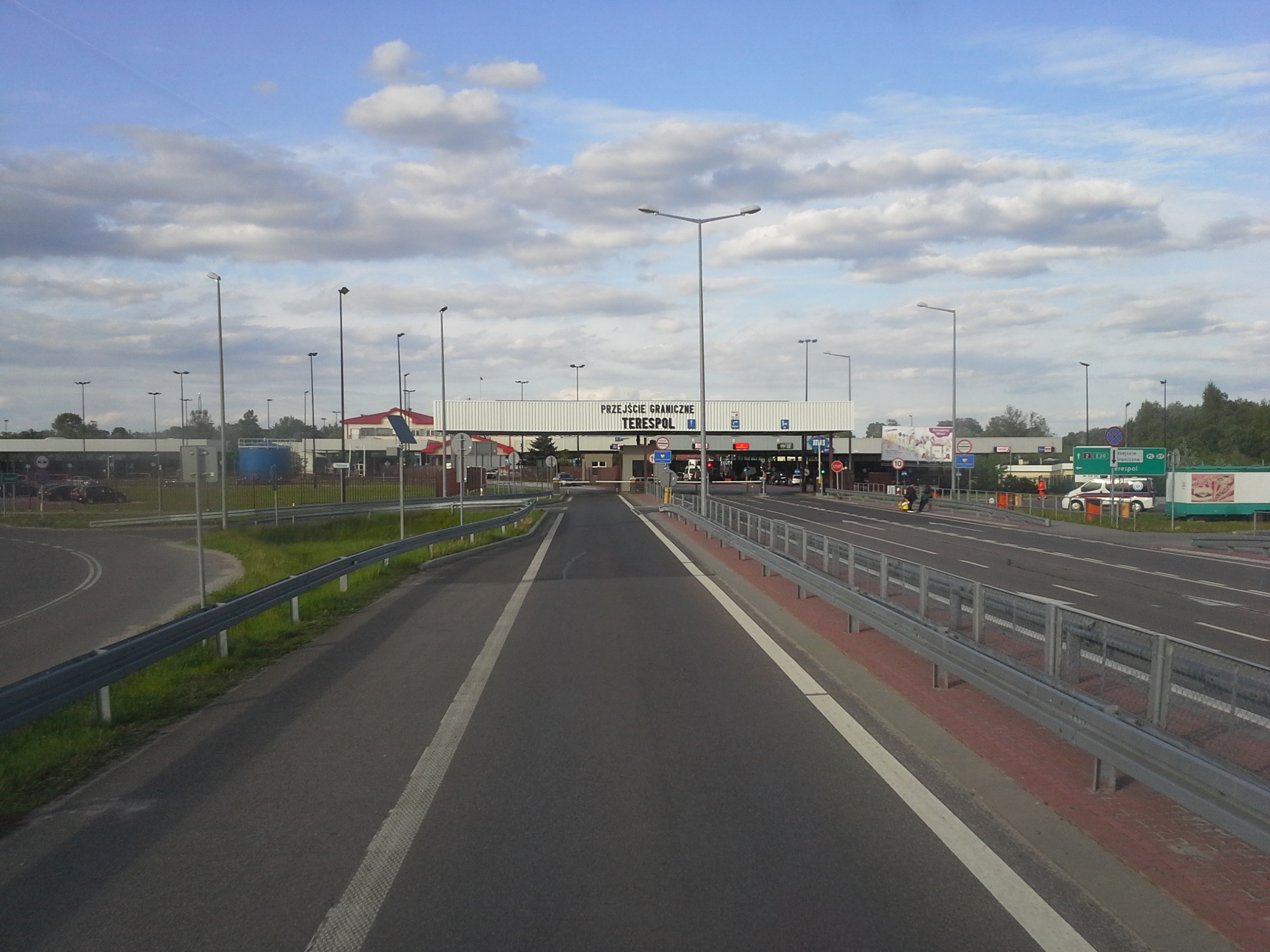
Terespol border checkpoint
