= Abraham Kalisker =

Hasidic rabbi (1741–1810)

Abraham HaKohen of Kalisk (1741–1810) was a prominent Chassidic rabbi of the 3rd generation of Chassidic leaders. He was a disciple of Dov Ber of Mezeritch.

== Biography ==
Kalisker was born in 1741 in Kalyshki, Belarus to Alexander. In his youth, he studied Torah with the Vilna Gaon, who later became the leader of the mitnagdim - i.e. those who opposed Hasidic Judaism.

Kalisker and his followers took an emotional and mystical approach towards the service of God in contrast to the formalism of traditional religious scholars, who focused on Talmudic study. After the death in 1772 of his teacher, Dov Ber of Mezeritch, most of the opposition to hasidism was directed against Kalisker and his disciples.

In 1777, at about age 36, he joined the first hasidic aliyah under the leadership of Menachem Mendel of Vitebsk and emigrated to the Holy Land. Their immigration was bankrolled by hallukot in the region. He died in Tiberias in the Ottoman Empire (currently in Israel) on 9 January 1810.
