= Terespol Gate =

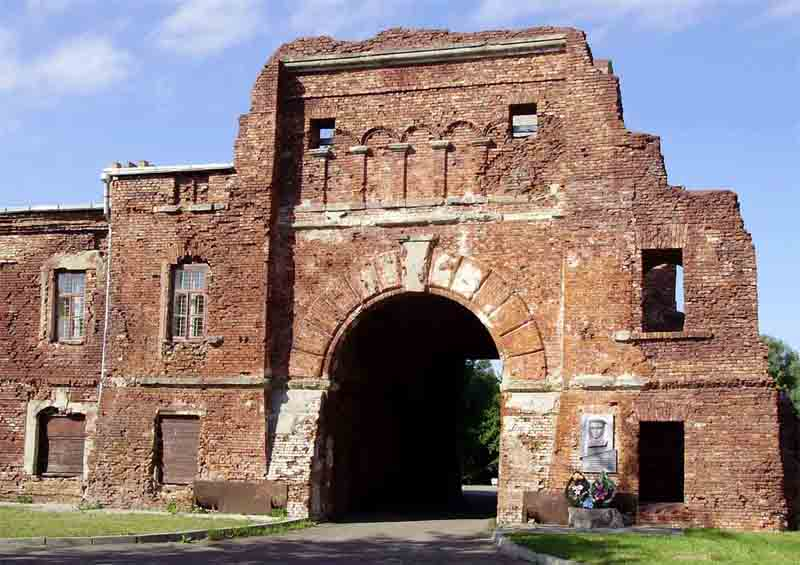
- The interior facade of the Terespol Gate, with damage from World War II still visible
- Interactive map of the Terespol Gate area

General information
- Type: gatehouse
- Classification: fortification
- Location: Brest Fortress, Brest, Belarus
- Coordinates: 52.0823975°N 23.6512464°E

The Terespol Gate was one of the four gates leading into the Citadel of the Russian Brest Fortress. It was designed in a classic style in the early 19th century. It faces the Bug River. A suspension bridge was built here in the early 19th century to span the Bug River. The bridge was badly damaged in 1915 at World War I. Another bridge built here before 1941 was ruined during World War II. Now there is no bridge here, however, a new suspension bridge for pedestrian cross border traffic will be built in coming years.

Before the war outbreak in 1941, the gate used to be a three-storey structure with small turrets above. Inside there were two enormous water tanks which supplied the Citadel with water. On June 22, 1941 Wehrmacht infantry made their way into the Citadel. During the battle the gate was badly damaged; the upper part was destroyed.

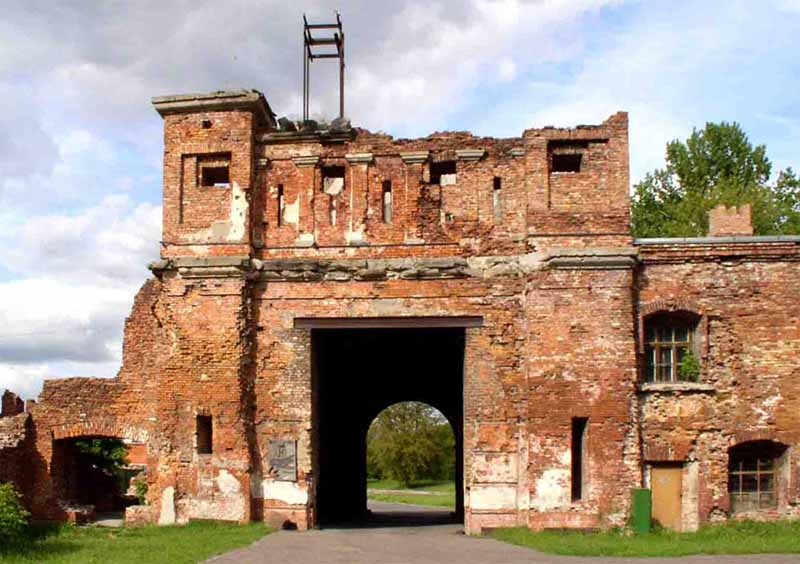
the outside façade of the Terespol Gate of the Brest Fortress.

== Books ==
- В. Бешанов. Бресткая крепость". Минск: Беларусь, 2004, ISBN 985-01-0428-7
