= Andrey Kizhevatov =

Hero of the Soviet Union

Andrey Mitrofanovich Kizhevatov
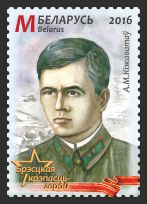
- Born: 31 August 1907; Penza Governorate, Russian Empire
- Died: 29 June 1941 (aged 33); Brest, Byelorussian SSR, Soviet Union
- Military career
- Allegiance: Soviet Union
- Branch: Border troops
- Rank: Lieutenant
- Conflicts: World War II; Defense of Brest Fortress †
- Awards: Hero of the Soviet Union

Andrey Mitrofanovich Kizhevatov (Russian: Андрей Митрофанович Кижеватов; 1907–1941) was a Soviet border guard commander, one of the leaders of the Defense of Brest Fortress during Operation Barbarossa, head of the 9th frontier post of the 17th Brest border detachment of the People's Commissariat of Internal Affairs (NKVD).

== Biography ==
Andrej Kizhevatov was born on 31 August 1907 in the village of Seliksa, Penza Governorate. He had served in the Red Army since 1929. After graduating from the school of junior commanders of the 7th separate artillery battalion, in 1930 he became the commander of a gun detachment in a separate equestrian division of the Belarusian border district. From November 1932, he was on long service, served at the Kulikovskaya outpost of the Timkovich frontier detachment, rising to the post of assistant chief of the border post by May 1938.

In 1939, Kizhevatov was promoted to junior lieutenant, and in September that same year he was appointed acting chief of the frontier post at Brest. On 17 July 1940 he was appointed head of the 9th frontier post of the 17th Brest frontier detachment located in the Brest Fortress. On 25 February 1941 he was promoted to the rank of lieutenant.

On June 22, 1941, Lieutenant Kizhevatov led the defense of the outpost and was wounded for the first time. On June 23, when only ruins remained from the outpost building, he and his fighters moved to the basements of the 333rd Infantry Regiment, located near the barracks, where a group of fighters under the command of Senior Lieutenant Potapov fought. In the following days, he continued, along with Potapov, to lead the defense of the barracks of the 333rd Regiment and the Terespol Gate. On June 29, when the ammunition was almost spent, it was decided to make the last desperate attempt to break through. Potapov led the breakthrough group, while 17 wounded soldiers led by the already seriously wounded Kizhevatov remained to be covered in the fortress. Lieutenant Kizhevatov perished in the ensuing battle. The breakthrough also ended in failure - most of its participants died or were captured.

In the autumn of 1942, the whole Kizhevatov family was shot by the Nazis in the village of Velikorit of Malorita District: his mother, wife and children — 15-year-old Nyura, 11-year-old Vanya, and two-year-old Galya.(source?)
