= Brest Fortress =

Fortress in Brest, Belarus

Coordinates: 52.082°N 23.658°E

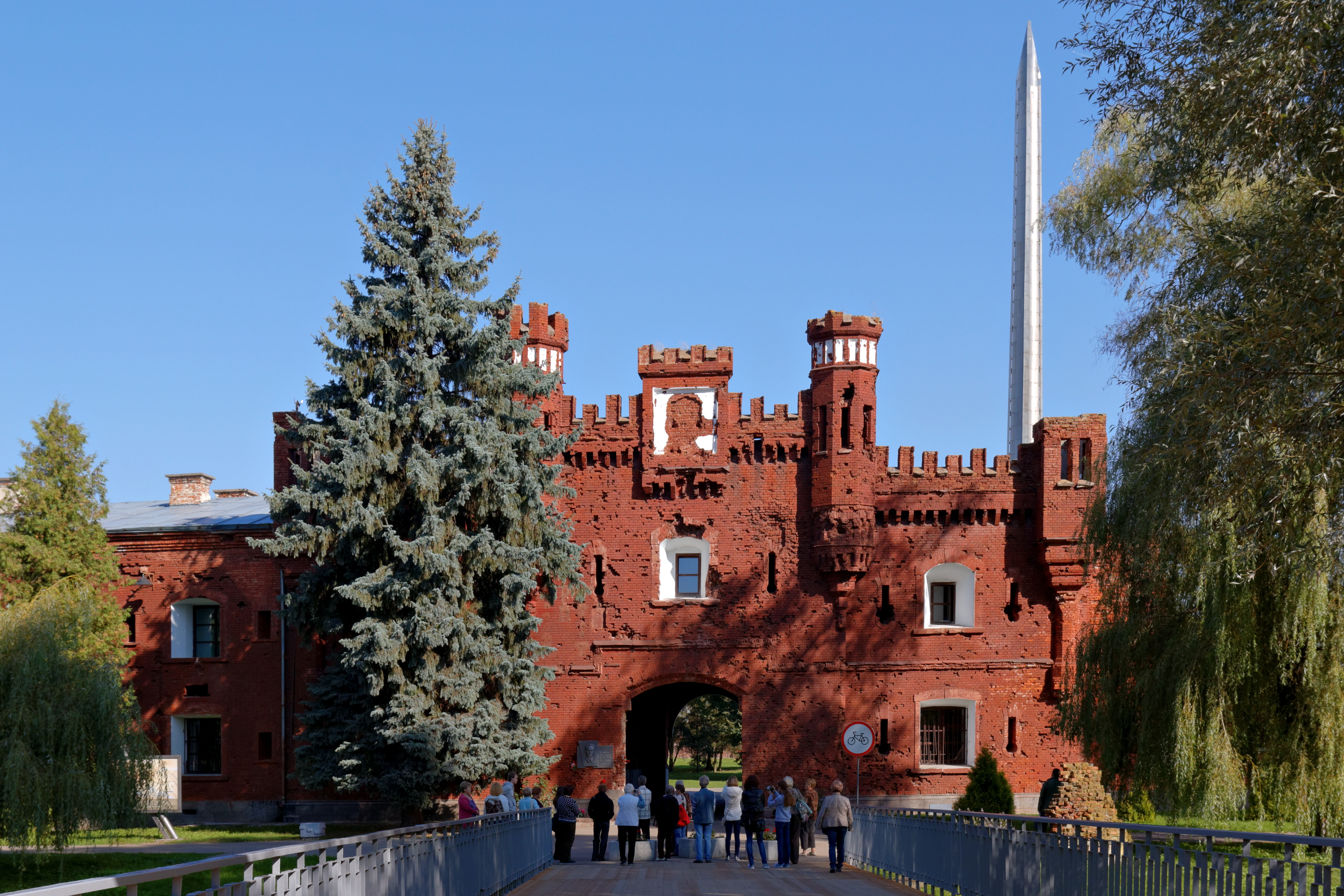
Brest Fortress

Brest Fortress (Note: Belarusian: Брэсцкая крэпасць, romanized: Bresckaja krepasć; Russian: Брестская крепость, romanized: Brestskaya krepost; Polish: Twierdza brzeska; Lithuanian: Bresto tvirtovė)) formerly known as Brest-Litovsk Fortress, is a 19th-century fortress in Brest, Belarus. In 1965, the title Hero Fortress was given to the fortress to commemorate the defence of the frontier stronghold during the first week of Operation Barbarossa, when Axis forces invaded the Soviet Union on 22 June 1941. The title "Hero Fortress" corresponds to the title "Hero City" that the Presidium of the Supreme Soviet of the Soviet Union awarded to twelve Soviet cities.

== Description ==
Brest Fortress has sustained its original outline of a star shaped fortification since its construction in the early 19th century. The Citadel, the core of the fortress, was on the central island formed by the Bug River and the two branches of the Mukhavets River. The island was skirted by a ring of a two-storied barrack with 4 semi-towers. The 1.8 km long barrack comprised 500 rooms to accommodate 12,000 soldiers within thick walls built from super strong red bricks. Originally there were 4 gates to enter the Citadel. Today only Kholm Gate and Terespol Gate can be seen; most of the barrack lies in ruins.

The Citadel was surrounded by 3 fortifications as bridgeheads, that were made up by branches of the Mukhavets River and moats (ditches), fortified by earthworks 10 m high with redbrick casemates inside. The 3 fortifications were named after two towns: Russian name for the city of Kobryn in Belarus, Terespol in Poland, and Volyn, a historic region of Volhynia majorly located in Ukraine. The Kobrin Fortification was the biggest in the fortress, located in the northeastern part, shaped like a horseshoe, featured 4 fortification curtains, 3 detached ravelins and a lunette in the western part, East Fort and West Fort. The Terespol Fortification was the western bridgehead, featuring 4 detached lunettes. The Volyn Fortification was the southeastern bridgehead, featuring 2 fortification curtains with 2 detached ravelins.

== History ==
=== Construction ===
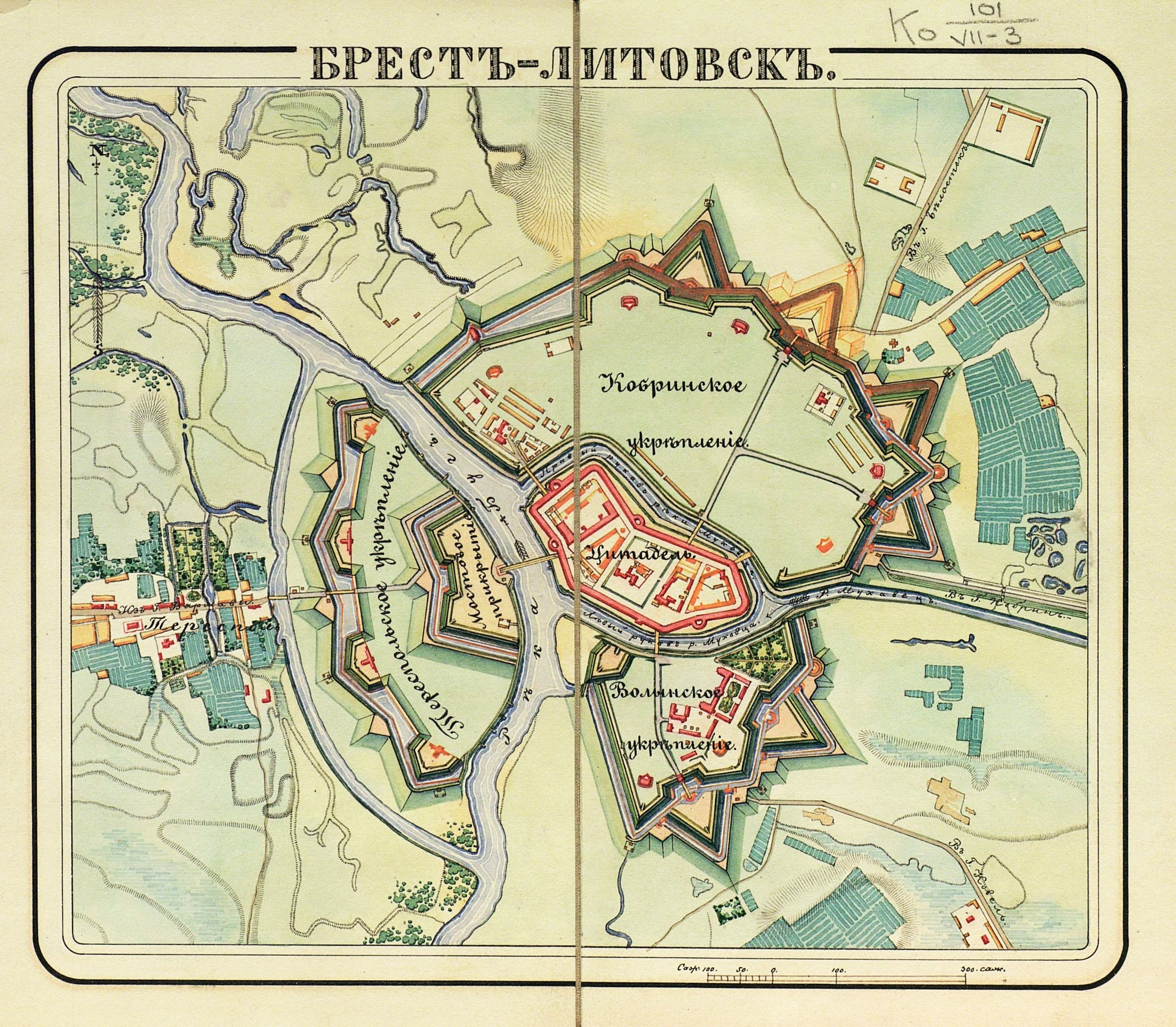
The fortress in the 1830s

The construction of the Imperial Russian fortress, in place of the old Ducal Lithuanian Brest Castle, started in 1833 based on a draft of the Russian military engineer Karl Opperman.

=== World War I ===
After the fall of the forts at Kaunas and the Modlin Fortress in Novogeorgievsk, the Russians abandoned Brest fortress, carrying away most of their stockpiled munitions. The Germans entered the fort on 26 August 1915. In 1918, the fort was the location of the signing of the Treaty of Brest-Litovsk, which made peace between USSR and the Central Powers.

=== World War II ===
The fortress in 1941

==== Polish defense of Brest Fortress ====
The Battle of Brześć Litewski (also known as the Siege of Brześć, Battle of Brest-Litovsk or simply Battle of Brześć) was a World War II battle involving German and Polish forces that took place between 14 and 17 September 1939, near the town of Brześć Litewski (now Brest, Belarus). After three days of heavy fighting for the stronghold in the town of Brześć, the Germans captured the fortress and the Poles withdrew.

On 14 September, 77 German tanks of the 2nd Battalion of the 8th Panzer Regiment, part of 10th Panzer Division, reached the area of Brześć and attempted to capture the fortress on the run. The probe attack was repelled by Polish infantry and the 113th company of light tanks, consisting of 12 obsolete Renault FT tanks. All the Polish tanks were destroyed, but the German forces were forced to retreat towards their initial positions. Polish armoured train number 53 (PP53), which made a reconnaissance advance to Wysokie Litewskie, was attacked by a scout patrol from the 10th Panzer Division. The crew from the train opened fire with artillery. Several other skirmishes were fought, but were largely inconclusive.

Later that day the German artillery arrived and started bombardment of both the fortress and the town. Heavy street fighting ensued. At dawn approximately half of the town was in German hands, the other half being defended by Polish infantry. Polish anti-tank weapons, artillery and AA guns were very scarce and were unable provide enough support for the infantry. The following day Polish defenders withdrew from the town, but heavy casualties on both sides prevented the German units from continuing the attacks on the fortress. Instead, it was constantly shelled with artillery and bombed by the Luftwaffe.

The main assault finally started in the early morning of 16 September. The defenders had plenty of small arms ammunition and light arms thanks to the munitions depot in the fortress, but had almost no anti-tank weapons and insufficient artillery cover.

Although the German infantry was repelled and the assault of German tanks was stopped by two FT tanks sealing the northern gate of the fortress, by nightfall it became apparent that the German pressure made the situation very grave. Despite heavy losses, the German 20th Motorized Division and 10th Armored Division captured the northern part of the citadel. Meanwhile, the combined 3rd Armored Division and 2nd Armored Division comprising the XXII Armored Corps entered the area. The Poles were unable to resupply and the casualties rose to almost 40%.

At dawn General Plisowski ordered part of the Polish forces to retreat from the easternmost fortifications and regroup to the other side of the river and southwards. The evacuation was completed by the early morning of 17 September when the last unit crossing the bridge blew it up to hinder the Germans.

After its capture by the Germans, it was soon passed on to the USSR per the German–Soviet Frontier Treaty.

==== Soviet defense of Brest Fortress ====
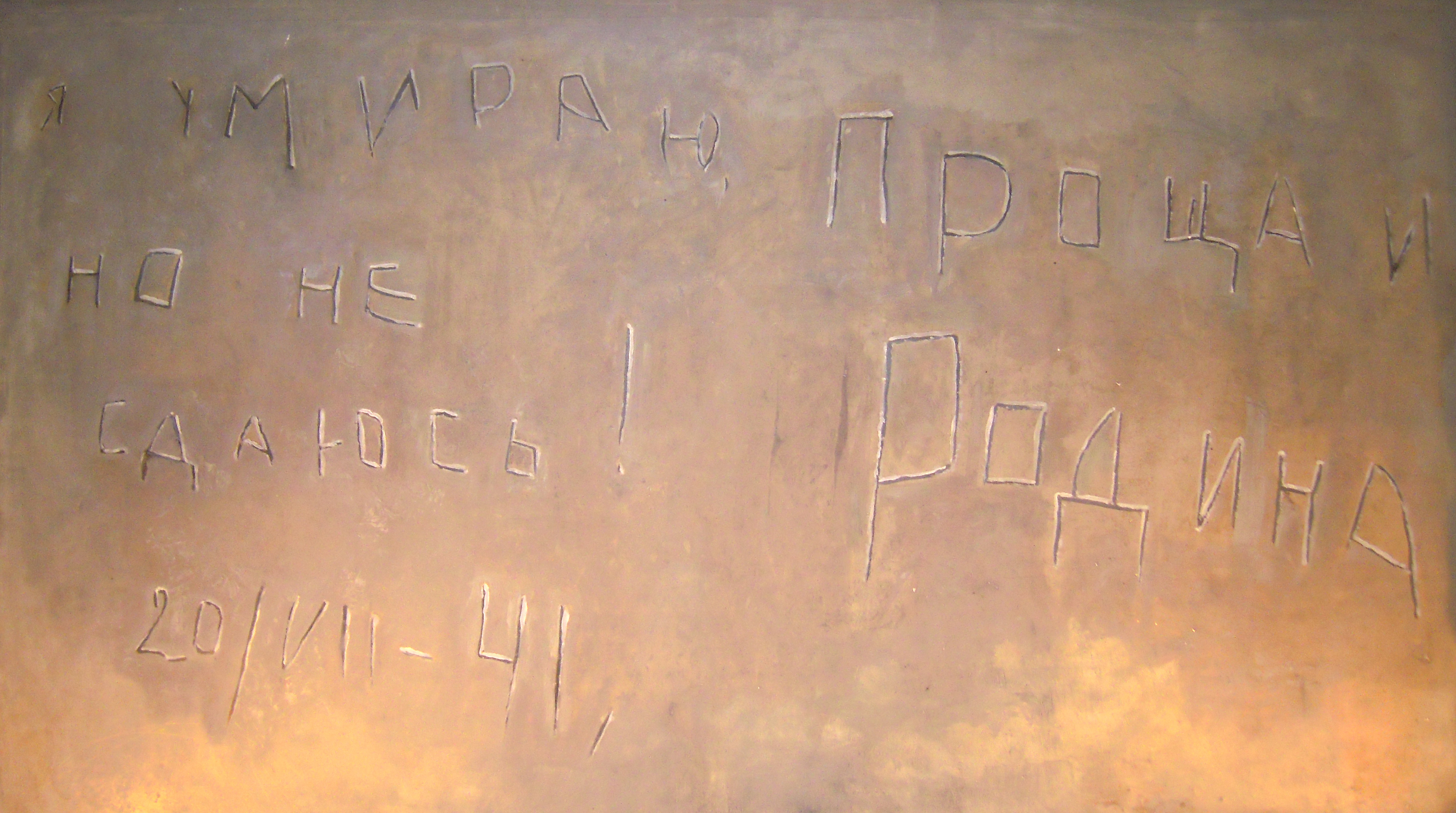
Copy of the inscription found inside the citadel: "I'm dying, but I won't surrender! Farewell Motherland. 20.VII.41" exhibited in the Museum of the defense of the Brest fortress

At 04:15 (Moscow time) 22 June 1941, the German Wehrmacht attacked the Brest fortress with no warning. The attack started with an artillery barrage, including 60cm mortars of the second battery of the Heavy Artillery Battalion 833 Nr. III ("Thor") and Nr. IV ("Odin"). The defenders were taken by surprise and initially failed to form a solid front. By 09:00 that day, the fortress was completely surrounded. The ensuing battle of Brest Fortress lasted for eight days, during which about two hundred soldiers and officers defending the fortress died; German casualties amounted to 430 soldiers and officers.

The last defended part in the fortress was taken by 29 June. All in all about 6,800 Soviet soldiers and commanders were captured.

According to Soviet accounts, the battle lasted until 20 July, with no one surrendering to the Germans. This narrative became a testament to the resilience and courage of Red Army and Soviet people. A few Soviet soldiers did indeed hold out inside pockets of the fortress until as late as 23 July.

The last Soviet platoon fighting in the fortress was led by Pyotr Gavrilov, a major commanding the 44th Motor Rifle Regiment of the 42nd Rifle Division. He surrendered with his remaining survivors on 23 July 1941 after holding out for 31 days and was held captive in Hammelburg and Ravensbrück concentration camps until his release after the end of the war in May 1945. He was awarded the Order of Lenin and the title Hero of the Soviet Union in 1957.

==== August 1941 ====
During a journey to different parts of the Eastern front, Hitler and Mussolini visited the fortress on 26 August 1941. Strong security measures were in place.

== Legacy ==
=== War memorial complex ===
In the late 1960s, the construction of the war memorial complex "Brest Hero Fortress" was started. The complex was opened on 25 September 1971. The memorial complex is a national place of grief and pride, a popular tourist attraction. It comprises the barracks, gunpowder bunkers, forts and other fortifications, the Museum of the Defence of Brest Fortress, located on the site of the old fortress, along with the new monumental structures: the Main Entrance, the Obelisk, the Main Monument, the sculpture "Thirst".

The centre of the complex is officially known as Ceremonial Square.

=== Tentative World Heritage site ===
This site was added to the UNESCO World Heritage Tentative List on 30 January 2004, in the Cultural category. It was removed from the list in 2016. In 2024, it was added to the list again, as a transnational nomination of memorials to the Great Patriotic War together with Russia's Mamayev Kurgan. Preservation and development is being carried out by the Brest Fortress Development Foundation.

=== Symbol of Brest city ===
The Brest Fortress is used as a symbol of the Belarusian city of Brest.

=== Brest in literature and popular culture ===
- Fortress of War (Russian: Брестская крепость), a 2010 Russian-Belarusian film
- Weary Sun Triumph Brest Fortress (Russian: Утомленное солнце Триумф Брестской крепости), a 2010 alternative history by Valeriy Belousov
- I, a Russian soldier (Russian: Я — русский солдат), a 1995 movie based on the novel His Name is Not in the List
- His Name is Not in the List (Russian: В списках не значился) novel by Boris Vasilyev)
- 1941: Brest Fortress. Kazakhstan. (Russian: 1941: Брестская крепость: Казахстан) book by Kazakh professor Akhmetova, Laila about the defenders of Brest Fortress from Kazakhstan (2016)

== See also ==
- Defense of Brest Fortress (1941)
- Battle of Brześć Litewski (1939)
- List of Jesuit sites
