= Lyozna =

Lyozna Лёзна (Belarusian) Лиозно (Russian)
- Urban-type settlement
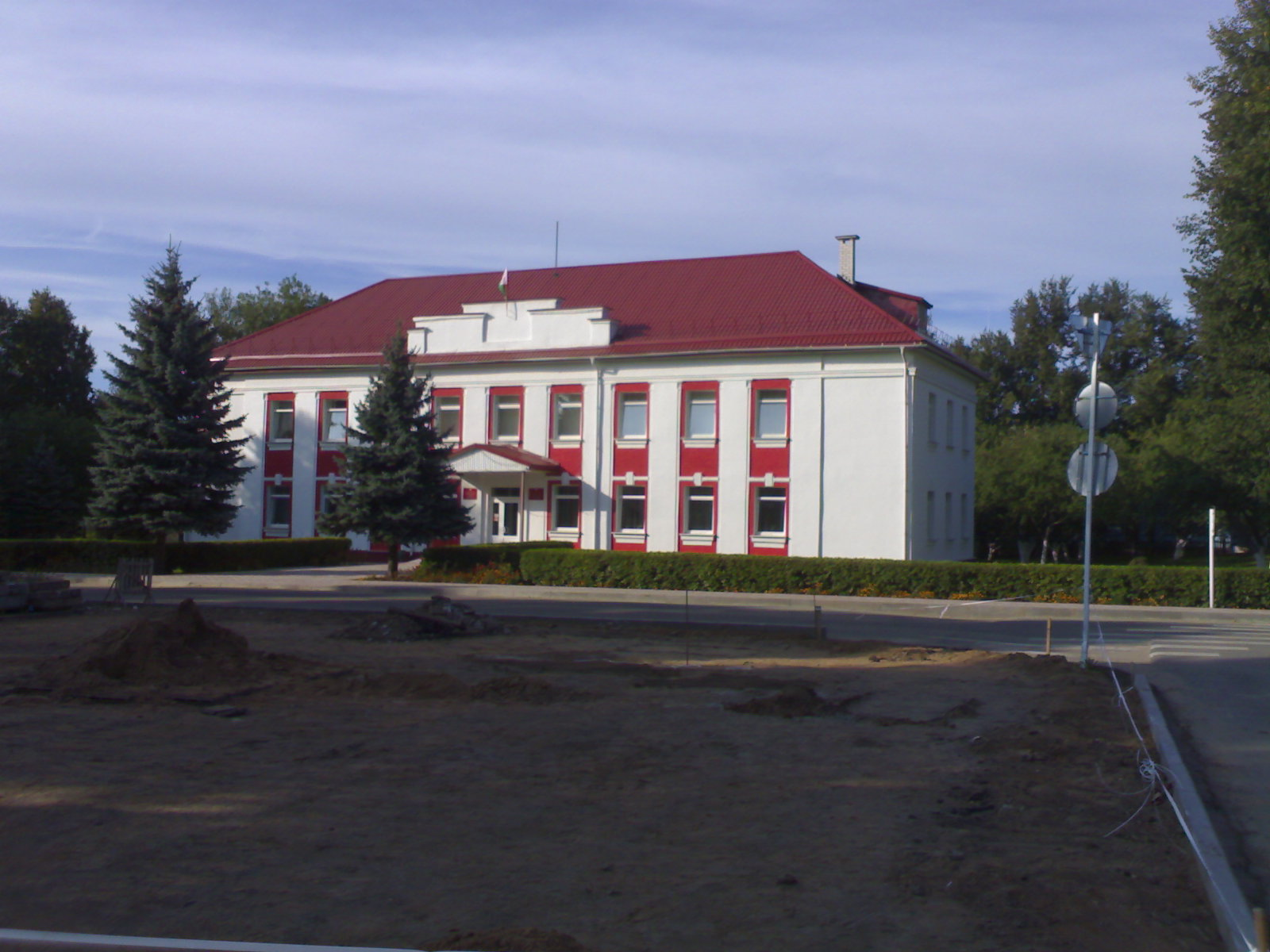
- Town hall

- Flag Coat of arms

- Location within Belarus
- Coordinates: 55°1′N 30°48′E
- Country: Belarus
- Region: Vitebsk Region
- District: Lyozna District
- Established: 1527
- Elevation: 193 m (633 ft)

Population (2025)
  - Total: 6,515
- Time zone: UTC+3 (MSK)
- Postal codes: 211220, 211221
- Area code: +375 2138
- License plate: 2
- Website: liozno.vitebsk-region.gov.by

Lyozna or Liozno (Note: Belarusian: Лёзна, romanized: Liozna; Russian: Лиозно, romanized: Liozno; Polish: Łoźna; German: Ljesno; Yiddish: ליאזנע, romanized: Lyozne.) is an urban-type settlement in Vitebsk Region, Belarus. It serves as the administrative center of Lyozna District. It is located 45 kilometres (28 mi) east-southeast of Vitebsk, close to the border with Russia by the Vitebsk–Smolensk railroad branch and highway, on the Moshna River. As of 2025, it has a population of 6,515.

== History ==
Lyozna is first mentioned in 1527. In 1654, it was mentioned as a shtetl (small town with a high Jewish population).

=== World War II ===
In 1939, 711 Jews lived in the settlement, making up 17.3 percent of the population.

During the German invasion of the Soviet Union, the settlement was captured on 16 July 1941 by V Army Corps of the 9th Army; it was part of Army Group Centre Rear Area. The ghetto in Lyozna was liquidated at the end of February 1942. Lyozna remained under German military occupation until 8 October 1943.

== Notable people ==
- Marc Chagall, Belarusian-French painter
- Schneur Zalman, the first Rebbe of the Chabad-Lubavitch Hasidic dynasty
- Dovber Schneuri, the second Rebbe of the Chabad-Lubavitch Hasidic dynasty
- Menachem Mendel Schneersohn, the third Rebbe of the Chabad-Lubavitch Hasidic dynasty

== Sources ==
- Megargee, Geoffrey P.; Dean, Martin (4 May 2012). The United States Holocaust Memorial Museum Encyclopedia of Camps and Ghettos, 1933 –1945: Volume II: Ghettos in German-Occupied Eastern Europe. Indiana University Press. ISBN 978-0-253-00202-0.
