= Karl Opperman =

German-born Russian officer, engineer and surveyor (1866–1831)

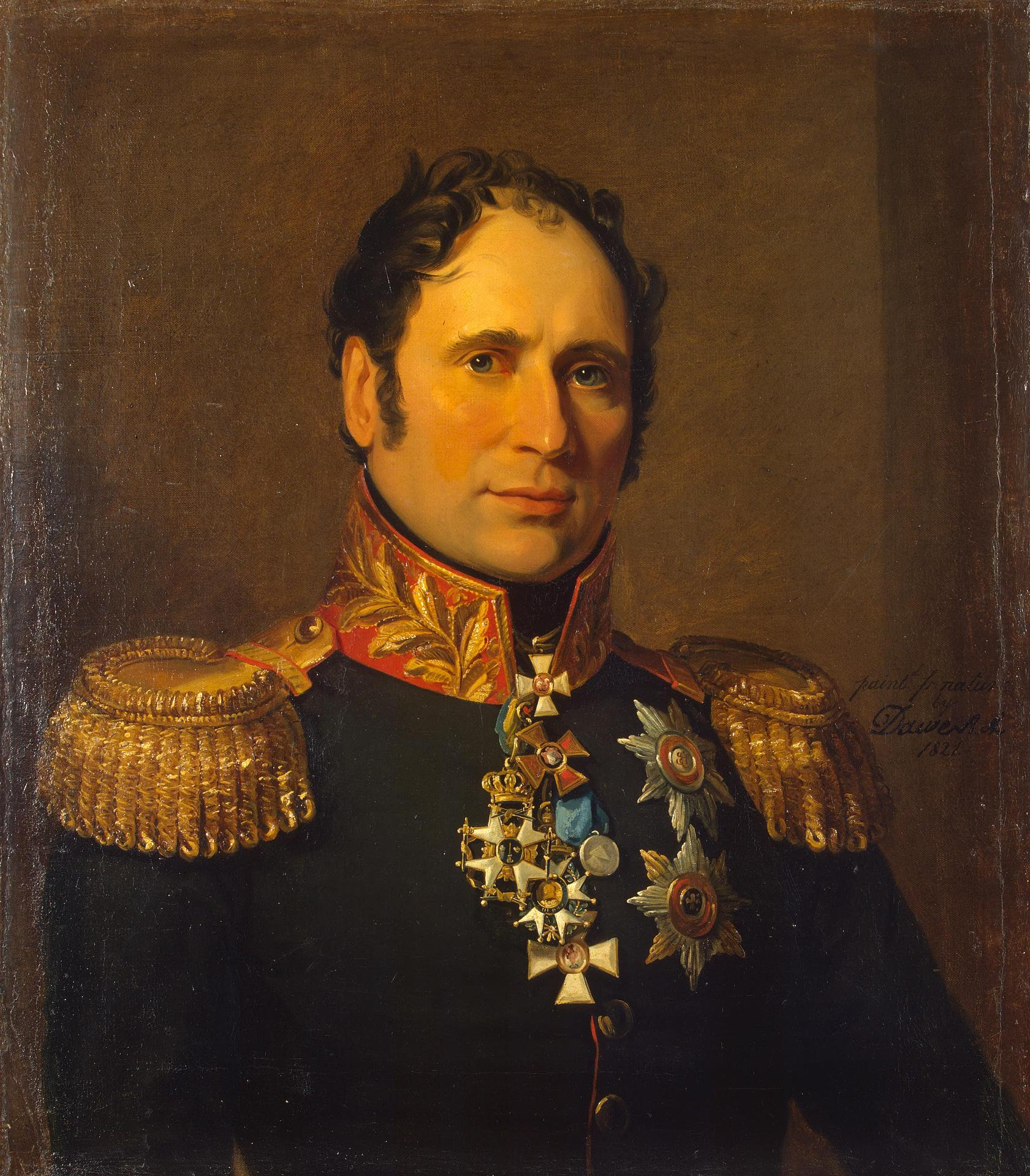
Portrait by George Dawe, 1821

Karl Ludwig Wilhelm Oppermann (Russian: Карл Иванович Опперман, romanized: Karl Ivanovich Opperman; 12 November 1766, Darmstadt – 2 July 1831, Vyborg) was a German-born engineer, surveyor, army officer and fortification builder in the service of the Imperial Russian Army. He fought in the Napoleonic Wars and was a member of the State Council, Director of the Engineering and Building Department, Head of the Engineering and Artillery School and the school guard sub-ensigns and cavalry cadets, director of the maps and the hydrographic depot and an honorary member of the Imperial Academy of Sciences.

== Life ==
From a middle-class family in the Landgraviate of Hesse-Darmstadt, his father was a privy councilor and a major dignitary at the court whilst research suggests his mother was a half-sister of Ludwig Heinrich von Nicolay (1737–1820). He was educated in engineering and mathematics and initially joined the Hessian army in 1779, in which he was promoted to engineer-captain in 1783. He also decided to move to Russia on October 12, 1793 and was accepted into the Engineer Corps with the rank of lieutenant.

In the late 18th century, he mapped the Partitions of Poland. His map (New Boundary Map of the Russian Empire from the Baltic to the Caspian Sea) was probably completed in 1797, but was backdated to 1795 to predate the 1796 death of Catherine the Great and decisions taken in its aftermath by Prussia and Austria. Opperman died in Vyborg on 2 July [14 July N.S.] 1831.

== Sources ==
- "Опперман, Карл Иванович" . Brockhaus and Efron Encyclopedic Dictionary (in Russian). 1906.
