= Defense of Brest Fortress =

Battle of World War II in 1941

Battle of Brest
- Part of the Eastern Front of World War II
- The Eastern Front at the time of the Battle of Brest.
Date	22–29 June 1941
Location	Brest, Belarusian SSR, Soviet Union
Result	German victory

Belligerents
Germany	Soviet Union

Commanders and leaders
(Nazi Germany) Fritz Schlieper	(Soviet Union) Pyotr Gavrilov (POW) (Soviet Union) Ivan Zubachyov (POW) (Soviet Union) Andrey Kizhevatov † (Soviet Union) Yefim Fomin (executed)

Strength
About 17,000, 2 panzer divisions	Over 9,000, 2 T-26 Infantry Tanks, BA-20 Bobik

Casualties and losses
429 dead, 668 wounded	More than 2,000 dead about 6,800 captured

The defense of Brest Fortress was the first battle of Operation Barbarossa, the Axis invasion of the Soviet Union launched on 22 June 1941. The German Army attacked without warning, expecting to take Brest on the first day, using only infantry and artillery, but it took them a week, and only after two bombardments by the Luftwaffe. Many defenders were killed or captured.

== Background ==
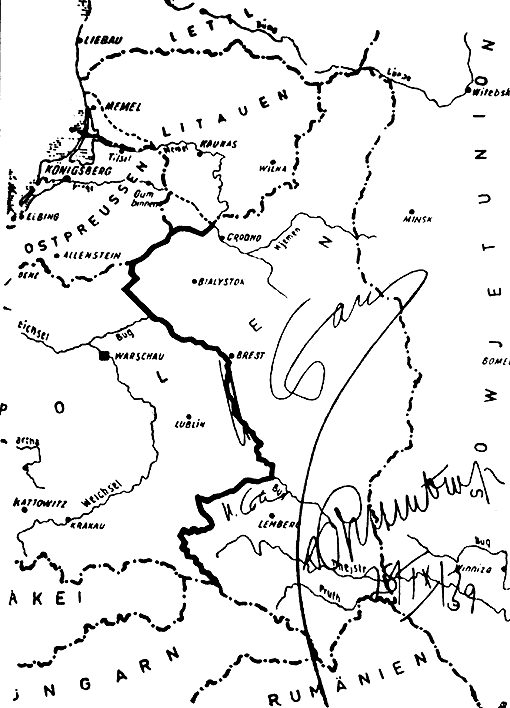
The map from the secret appendix to the Molotov–Ribbentrop Pact showing the new German-Soviet border after September 1939; the town of Brest can be seen as located next to the border.

The area around the nineteenth-century Brest Fortress was the site of the 1939 Battle of Brześć Litewski, when the German XIX Panzer Corps captured it from the Polish Army during the Polish September Campaign. According to the terms of the 1939 German–Soviet non-aggression pact, the territory around Brest and 52 per cent of Poland was assigned to the Soviet Union.

In the summer of 1941, the Germans advanced to capture the fortress from the Red Army. The Germans planned to seize Brest and the Brest Fortress, which was in the path of Army Group Centre, during the first day of Operation Barbarossa. The fortress and the city controlled the crossings over the Bug River, as well as the Warsaw–Moscow railway and highway.

== Opposing forces ==
The Brest garrison consisted of approximately 9,000 Soviet soldiers, including regular soldiers, tankmen, border guards and NKVD operatives. The Red Army soldiers belonged to elements of the 6th and 42nd Rifle Divisions, under Colonel Mikhail Popsuy-Shapko and Major-general Ivan Lazarenko respectively, the 17th Frontier Guards Detachment of the NKVD Border Troops and various smaller units (including the hospital garrison and a medical unit, as well as units of the 132nd Separate NKVD Convoy Battalion of the Internal Troops of the Soviet Union, etc.) inside the fortress. There were also 300 families of the servicemen inside the fortress.

The Austrian 45th Infantry Division (about 17,000 strong) had to take the fortress during the first day. For the first five minutes of the shelling it was supported by parts of the artillery of the 31st and 34th Infantry Divisions. The 45th Division had neither aircraft nor tanks at its disposal but was supported on 22 June by a battery of assault guns (Sturmgeschütze) from 34th Division and on 29 June, by some Ju 88 bombers that dropped 23 bombs.

== Siege ==
The layout of the Brest Fortress in June 1941

The fortress had no warning when the Axis invasion began on 22 June 1941, and it became the site of the first battle between Soviet forces and the Wehrmacht. The attack started with a 29-minute bombardment by artillery and Nebelwerfer. Many of the Soviet survivors of the fighting wrote after the war that the fortress was bombed by German aircraft. Due to the simultaneous artillery fire, tank support against the fortress made this not possible. Only two air raids took place on 29 June 1941, but then only the East Fort on the northern island of the fortress was bombed by the Luftwaffe. The initial artillery fire took the fortress by surprise, inflicting severe material damage and personnel casualties. The first German assault groups crossed the Bug river four minutes after the bombardment had started; the surprised Soviet defenders were unable to form a solid front and instead defended isolated strongpoints–the most important of which was the fortress.

Some Soviet troops managed to escape the fortress but most were trapped inside by the encircling German forces. Despite having the advantage of surprise, the attempt by the Germans to take the fortress with infantry quickly stalled with many losses: about 281 Wehrmacht soldiers died the first day in the fighting for the fortress. Fighting continued two more days. By the evening of 24 June 1941, some 368 Germans had been killed and 4,000–5,000 Red Army soldiers had been captured. On 25 and 26 June 1941, local fighting continued mainly in the citadel. In the evening of 26 June 1941 most of the northern Kobrin fortification, except the East Fort, was captured.

Of the fighting around East Fort, the commander of the 45th Infantry Division, Generalmajor Fritz Schlieper, wrote to Oberkommando der Wehrmacht (OKW, German armed forces high command)

It was impossible to advance here with only infantry at our disposal because the highly-organised rifle and machine-gun fire from the deep gun emplacements and horse-shoe-shaped yard cut down anyone who approached. There was only one solution – to force the Soviets to capitulate through hunger and thirst. We were ready to use any means available to exhaust them... Our offers to give themselves up were unsuccessful...

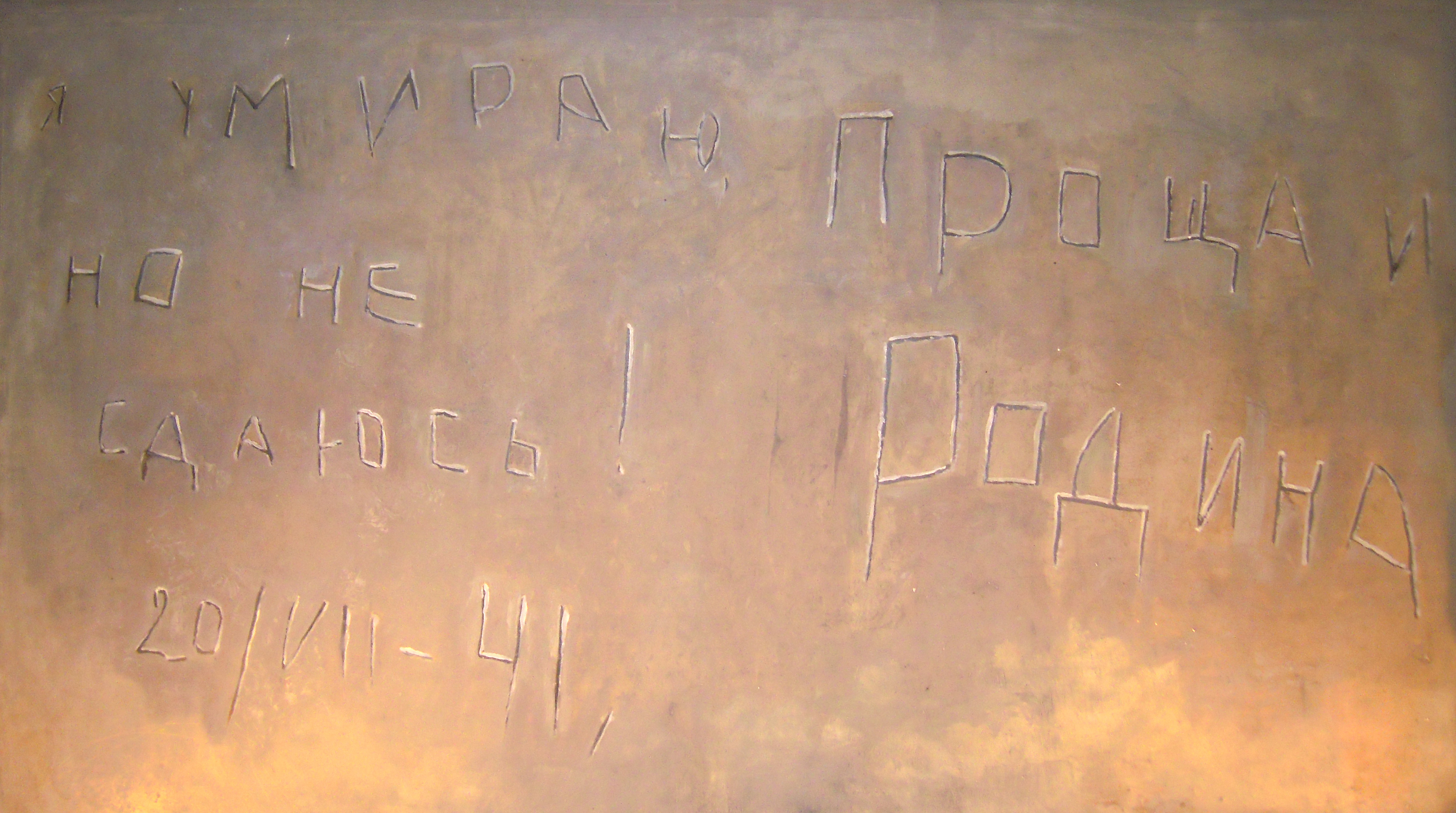
Copy of the inscription found inside the citadel: "I'm dying, but I won't surrender! Farewell Motherland. 20.VII.41" exhibited in the Museum of the defense of the Brest fortress

Although the Soviet soldiers in the opening hours of the battle were stunned by the surprise attack, outnumbered, short of supplies and cut off from the outside world, many of them held out much longer than the Germans expected. The Germans used artillery, rocket mortars 15 cm Nebelwerfer 41 and flame throwers. The civilians inside the fortress tended the wounded, reloaded the machine-gun drums and belts and took up rifles to help defend the fortress. Children brought ammunition and food supplies from half-destroyed supply depots, scavenged weapons and watched enemy movements.

Schlieper wrote in his detailed report that,

...the 81st Combat Engineer Battalion was given the task of blowing up a building on the Central Island ... in order to put an end to the Russian [sic – Soviet] flanking fire on the North Island. Explosives were lowered from the roof of the building towards the windows, then the fuses were lit. When they exploded, we could hear the Soviet soldiers screaming and groaning, but they continued to fight.

Chaplain Rudolf Gschöpf wrote,

We only gradually managed to take one defensive position after another as a result of stubborn fighting. The garrison of the so-called "Officers' House" on the Central Island only ceased to exist with the building itself ... The resistance continued until the walls of the building were destroyed and razed to the ground by more powerful explosions.

On 24 June, with Germans having taken most parts of the fortress, some Soviet troops were able to link up and coordinate their actions under the command of Captain Ivan Zubachyov; his second in command was Regimental Commissar Yefim Fomin. On 26 June small Soviet forces tried to break out from the siege but failed and suffered many casualties; that day Zubachyov and Fomin were captured. Zubachyov was sent to a POW camp in Hammelburg where he died; Yefim Fomin was executed on spot under the Commissar Order and as a Jew.

German soldiers in the Citadel in June 1941

As the East Fort could not be taken by infantry, the Luftwaffe bombed it twice on 29 June and forced its approximately 360 defenders to surrender.

Gschöpf wrote

Late on the 30th of June the division received the order to abandon Brest. Early on the 1st of July we paid tribute to the perished in the Division cemetery that was laid out on the eve... The main units of the Division abandoned Brest on the 2nd of July 1941.

The total German losses in the battle for the Brest fortress were about 429 killed and about 668 wounded. Soviet losses numbered about 6,800 POWs and about 2,000 dead. The magnitude of these losses can be weighed by the fact that total German losses on the Eastern Front up to 30 June 1941 amounted to 8,886 killed; the fighting at Brest accounted for over 5 per cent of all German fatalities.

After eight days of battle, the Germans had captured the fortress but the strategic objectives – control over the Panzerrollbahn I, the road to Moscow, the important railway line and the bridges over the Bug river – were accomplished on the very first day of the war. Because of the high German losses the German High Command demanded General Fritz Schlieper to present a detailed report regarding combat at Brest 22–29 June 1941. It was made on July 8, 1941. A copy was captured by the Red Army near the town of Livny, Russia in winter 1941–1942.

Some individual soldiers and perhaps small groups of Red Army soldiers kept hiding in the fortress after the fall of the Eastern Fort. After the war, graffiti were found on some fortress walls. They became iconic symbols of the defense. Two of them said

We'll die but we'll not leave the fortress

and

I'm dying but I won't surrender. Farewell, Motherland. 20.VII.41.

—

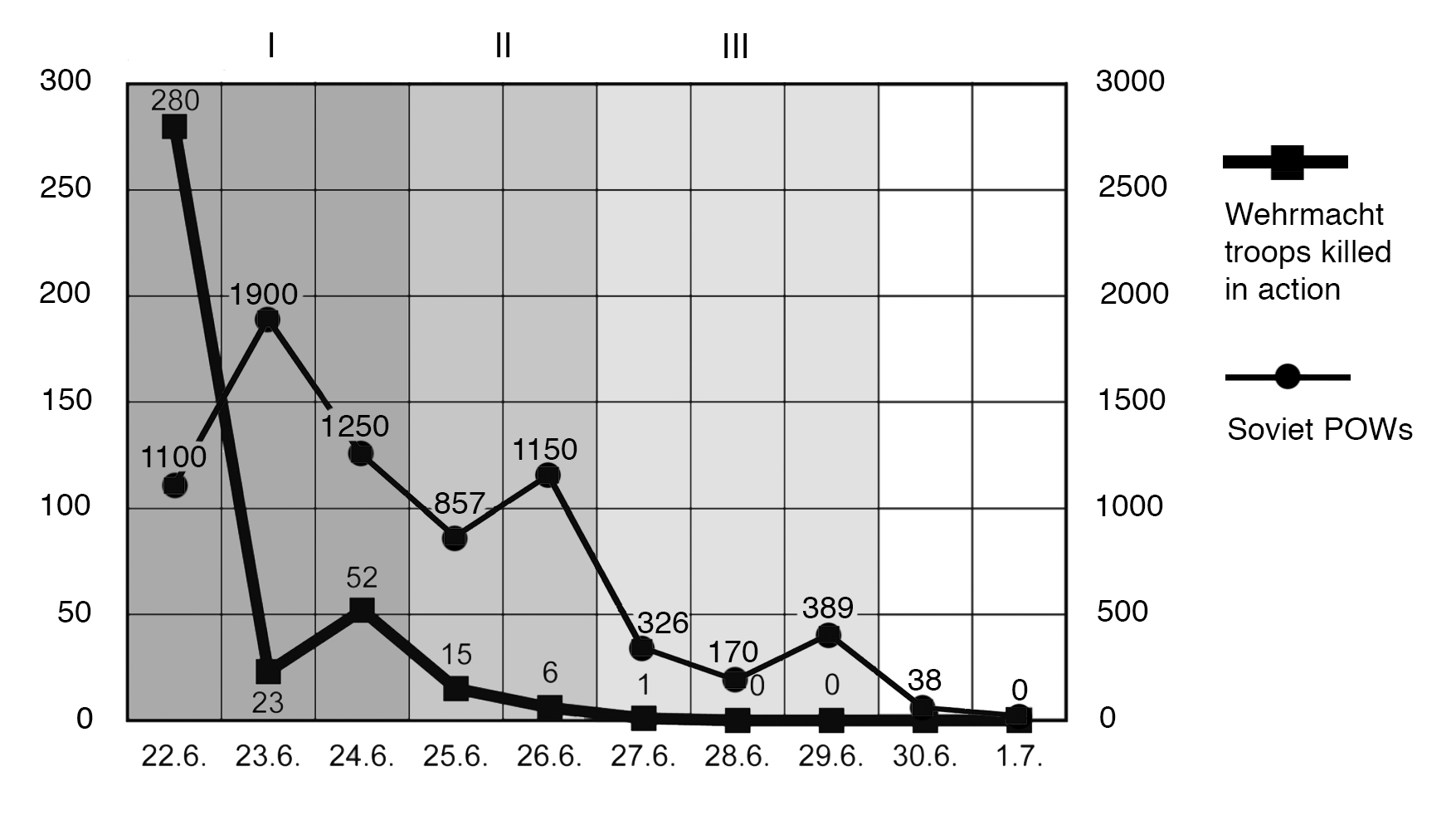
Development of losses in the battle for the Brest fortress in June 1941

It is said that Major Pyotr Gavrilov, one of the best known defenders of Brest (later decorated for it as Hero of the Soviet Union) was captured only on 23 July.

The only documented proof of resistance after 29 June 1941 is a report that states that a shoot-out occurred on July 23, 1941, with the subsequent capture of a Soviet lieutenant ("Oberleutnant") the next day.

== Aftermath ==
Since the mid-1950s, a myth grew that the fortress held out for 32 days and that the defenders refused to surrender.

After the publication in 1957 and 1959 of his first books about the defenders of the Brest Fortress ("Brest Fortress" and "Heroes of the Brest Fortress"), S. S. Smirnov devoted ten years to a new, significantly revised and expanded edition of the book "Brest Fortress":

"This book is the fruit of ten years of work on the history of the defense of the Brest Fortress: many trips and long thoughts, searches for documents and people, meetings and conversations with you. [It] is the final result of this work.

Stories and novels, poems and historical studies will be written about you, about your tragic and glorious struggle, plays and films will be created. Let others do it. Perhaps the material I collected will help the authors of these future works. In a big business, it's worth being just one step, if this step leads up. Ten years ago, the Brest Fortress lay in forgotten, abandoned ruins, and you – its hero-defenders – were not only unknown, but, as people who mostly went through Hitler's captivity, you encountered offensive distrust of yourself, and sometimes experienced direct injustice." .

— Sergey Smirnov, Open letter to the heroes of the Brest Fortress, 1964.

Smirnov was awarded the 1965 Lenin Prize in the field of literature and journalism.

Brest Fortress became a symbol of Soviet resistance. In 1965, the fortress received the title of Hero Fortress for the 1941 defense. In 1971, a huge memorial was opened with the Museum of the Defense of the Brest Fortress as its centrepiece. Several monuments in the style of socialist realism dominate the area. The main monument, a 32 m (105 ft)-high concrete head, in 2014 was purportedly "awarded" the title of "the world's ugliest monument" by CNN, for which the CNN Moscow Chief of staff had to apologize, as this caused outrage.

The events surrounding the defense of Brest Fortress were dramatized in the 1957 film Immortal Garrison and again in the 2010 film Fortress of War. The Soviet writer Boris Vasilyev wrote a novel named His Name Is Not in the List (В списках не значился) about a soldier named Nikolai Pluzhnikov who defended the Brest Fortress in 1941. At the end of the novel, when Pluzhnikov was captured by the German troops and was interrogated, he simply replied "I am a Russian soldier," and died due to exhaustion from months of fighting. Vasilyev's novel was dramatized in the 1995 film I, a Russian soldier (Я — русский солдат), directed by Andrey Malyukov.

Amongst the huge amount of Soviet literature there are no academic publications, since Soviet historians avoided the topic. The first Russian semi-academic monograph was published only in 2008 by Rostislav Aliev.
