= Pyotr Gavrilov =

Soviet officer

- Born: 30 June 1900; Kazan Governorate, Russian Empire
- Died: 26 January 1979 (aged 78); Krasnodar, Soviet Union
- Military career
- Allegiance: Soviet Union
- Conflicts: World War II; Defense of Brest Fortress
- Awards: Hero of the Soviet Union

Pyotr Mikhaylovich Gavrilov (Russian: Пётр Миха́йлович Гаври́лов; 30 June 1900 – 26 January 1979) was a Soviet officer known as the hero of the Defense of Brest Fortress.

== Biography ==
Pyotr Gavrilov was an ethnic Kryashen Tatar and a major in command of the 44th Motor Rifle Regiment of the 42nd Rifle Division. On 23 July 1941, he was taken captive by the Germans after holding out for 31 days and was held captive until his release after the end of the war in May 1945.

After his release from captivity, he was restored to the army in the same rank, but his party membership was not restored due to the loss of his membership card and stay in captivity. He was reassigned as the chief of camp for Japanese prisoners of war in Siberia in 1946–1947. Afterwards, he moved to Krasnodar.

In 1956, he was reunited with his first wife and adopted son, whom he had not seen since the first day of the war. After Sergey Smirnov's book The Brest Fortress («Брестская крепость») was published in 1956, Gavrilov's party membership was reinstated. By a decree of the Presidium of the Supreme Soviet of the USSR dated January 3, 1957, Pyotr Mikhailovich Gavrilov was awarded the title of Hero of the Soviet Union and the Order of Lenin.

Subsequently, Gavrilov made a number of trips around the USSR and was actively involved in social work. Delegations, filmmakers and journalists began visiting him. Gavrilov was given a three-room apartment in a new building. From 1968 until the end of his life, he lived in Krasnodar at house 103 on Svetlaya Street (in 1980 it was renamed Gavrilova Street).

He died in Krasnodar on January 26, 1979. He was buried with military honors at the Brest garrison memorial cemetery next to his comrades in arms, according to his will.

=== Memory ===
- Streets in Kazan, Brest, Krasnodar, Irkutsk and Pestretsy are named after Gavrilov.
- A collective farm in his native village of Alvidino was also named after him.
- A peak in the Central Tien Shan is named after P. M. Gavrilov.
- A museum has been opened in Alvidin, the native village of Pyotr Gavrilov.
- The name of P. M. Gavrilov was given to secondary school No. 23 in Brest. One of the exhibitions in the school museum is dedicated to P. M. Gavrilov.

== Notes ==
- Smirnov S.S. (1965). Brest Fortress. On your way, romantic. Moscow: Young Guard. Archived from the original on 2007-09-29. (496 pages)
- Khanin L. (1963). Heroes of the Soviet Union - Sons of Tataria. Kazan: Tatar Book Publishing House. pp. 93–99.
