= Lyozna district =

District of Vitebsk region, Belarus

Lyozna district Лёзненскі раён (Belarusian) Лиозненский район (Russian)
- District
- Flag Coat of arms

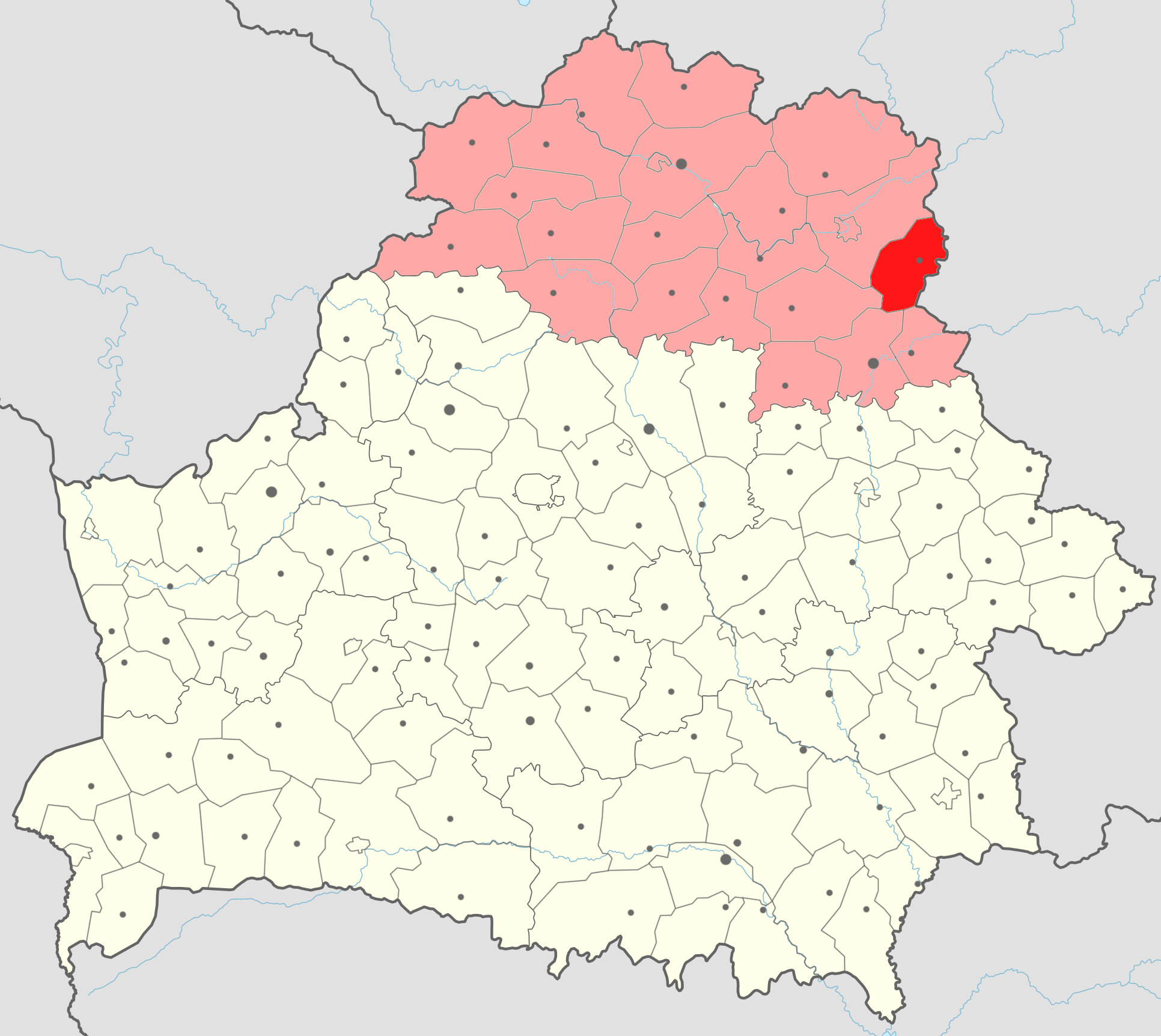
- Coordinates: 55.0167°N 30.8000°E
- Country: Belarus
- Region: Vitebsk region
- Administrative center: Lyozna

Area
  - Total: 1,417.63 km^{2} (547.35 sq mi)

Population (2023)
  - Total: 15,022
  - Density: 10.597/km^{2} (27.445/sq mi)
- Time zone: UTC+3 (MSK)

Lyozna district (Belarusian: Лёзненскі раён; Russian: Лиозненский район) is a district (raion) of Vitebsk region, Belarus. The administrative center of the district is Lyozna.
