= Ivan Sidorovich Lazarenko =

Soviet general (1895–1944)

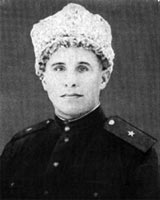
- Born: 8 October [O.S. 26 September] 1895; Staromikhailovka, Labinsky Otdel, Kuban Oblast, Russian Empire
- Died: 26 June 1944 (aged 48) near Kholmy, Chavusy Raion, Mogilev Oblast, Soviet Union
- Military career
- Allegiance: Russian Empire; Soviet Union
- Branch: Imperial Russian Army; Red Army
- Service years: 1915–1917; 1918–1944
- Rank: Major general
- Commands: Karelian Fortified Region; 42nd Rifle Division; 369th Rifle Division
- Conflicts: World War I; Russian Civil War; Spanish Civil War; World War II; Winter War; Eastern Front
- Awards: Hero of the Soviet Union; Order of Lenin; Order of the Red Banner (2); Order of the Patriotic War, 1st class; Cross of St. George, 1st, 2nd, 3rd, and 4th class

Ivan Sidorovich Lazarenko (Russian: Иван Сидорович Лазаренко; 8 October 1895 – 26 June 1944) was a Red Army major general and a posthumous Hero of the Soviet Union.

From 1940 to 1941 he was the commander of the 42nd Rifle Division. After his division was destroyed near Brest, Belarus, during the German invasion of the Soviet Union (see also Defense of Brest Fortress), in 1941 he was court-martialed and condemned to death, but the sentence was canceled. In 1943 he became the commander of the 369th Rifle Division; he was killed in action in 1944. Lazarenko was posthumously awarded the title Hero of the Soviet Union for his leadership of the division in the Mogilev Offensive.

== Early life and World War I ==
Lazarenko was born on 8 October 1895 in the stanitsa of Staromikhailovka in the Labinsky Otdel of Kuban Oblast (now Mikhailovka, Kurganinsky District, Krasnodar Krai) to a peasant family. After graduating from seven grades at a gymnasium, he worked as a miner. During World War I, Lazarenko was mobilized into the Imperial Russian Army's 5th Amur Border Regiment on 15 May 1915. In September, he was sent to the 107th Severotroitsk Cavalry Regiment, fighting on the Western Front. There, Lazarenko graduated from the regiment's training unit. He was awarded four Crosses of St. George for his actions on the Southwestern Front, making him a Full Cavalier of St. George. During the Povolzhye famine of 1921, Lazarenko donated his crosses for famine relief. For his actions, he was promoted to senior unteroffizier and later wachtmeister, and given command of a platoon for 1.5 years, in addition to carrying the regimental flag for five months.

== Russian Civil War ==
On 27 September 1917, due to illness, Lazarenko was evacuated from the front to Moscow, and from there was sent to the 3rd Machine Gun Regiment in Saratov, where he joined a Red Guard detachment on 12 October. For participating in a demonstration, he was arrested on 20 October, but after the Bolsheviks seized power in Saratov on 27 October Lazarenko was released and appointed a platoon commander in the detachment. With the detachment, he fought in battles with the Ural Cossacks, who attempted to recapture the city.

In December, Lazarenko was transferred to the 2nd Atamanovsky Regiment, which was disarmed by White Cossack commander Krasnov's troops in Rostov-on-Don at the end of the month. He then joined the Rostov Red Guard detachment and was made a battery commander, fighting in battles against Krasnov's troops. Lazarenko transferred to become a squadron commander in a detachment led by Rudolf Sivers during battles with White troops at Novorossiysk and Tsaritsyn. At the end of June 1918, the detachment was converted into the Stenka Razin Cavalry Detachment, which his squadron also joined.

During the summer, he fought in battles near Penza, and became detachment commander after the death of its commander at the end of July, joining the Red Army in September. Lazarenko fought in battles near Syzran and Ufa, and was concussed while fighting on the Belaya River. He was treated in military hospitals and went back into combat in January 1919 as a platoon commander in the 63rd Cavalry Regiment, fighting against Anton Denikin's troops on the Southern Front. In May, he became a machine gun squadron commander in the 1st Kuban Zlobin Regiment of Dmitry Zhloba's 1st Partisan Cavalry Brigade. Lazarenko was treated in the hospital from November to December, then was sent to the 1st Exemplary Regiment in the 1st Special Purpose Brigade, where he became a machine gun squadron commander and assistant regimental commander for line units. During his time on the Southern Front in 1919 and 1920, Lazarenko fought in battles at Lugansk, Debaltseve, Novocherkassk, Rostov-on-Don, Manych, Krasnodar, and Novorossiysk.

He was wounded on 26 March 1920, and upon his recovery became a platoon commander in the 15th Don Rifle Regiment. With the unit, Lazarenko fought against Pyotr Wrangel's White army, and participated in the destruction of Colonel Fyodor Nazarov's diversionary landing force in the area of the Konstantinovskoye and Razdorskaya stanitsas. In July and August, he fought in the repulse of Sergei Ulagay's landing operation, particularly distinguishing himself in battle at the stanitsa of Stepnoy, where he captured troops of General Babiev. For his actions, Lazarenko was personally awarded the Order of the Red Banner by Lenin. In September, the regiment was merged into the 10th Rifle Regiment of the 2nd Cavalry Division's 1st Brigade, and he became a machine gun section commander, fighting in battles with Wrangel's troops in the areas of Mariupol, Bolshoy Tokmak, Melitopol, Aleksandrovskoye, and in Crimea. After the defeat of the White forces Lazarenko fought against Nestor Makhno's Revolutionary Insurrectionary Army of Ukraine in Taurida Governorate during late 1920. He joined the Communist Party of the Soviet Union in 1921, and took part in the suppression of partisan forces led by Popov, Fyodorov, and Sychyov in the Donbas and Don Oblast.

== Interwar period ==
After the end of the war, the 1st Brigade became the 4th Red Banner Rifle Regiment, which later became the 9th Rifle Division's 25th Cherkassy Red Banner Rifle Regiment, with Lazarenko continuing as machine gun section commander and then commander of a machine gun company. In September 1924, he entered the Vystrel courses, graduating a year later. In October 1926, he was seconded to the Novocherkassk OGPU replacement battalion as a clerk. In March 1927, he returned to the 25th Rifle Regiment, successively serving as commander of a machine gun company, battalion, and acting regimental commander. In 1929, he graduated from the Novocherkassk Communist University. Lazarenko transferred to command the Moscow Military District's 27th Separate Territorial Rifle Battalion at Borisoglebsk in November 1931. He completed two Frunze Military Academy correspondence courses in 1934 and in 1935 graduated from reconnaissance courses in Moscow.

In March 1935, he took command of the 49th Rifle Division's reconnaissance battalion. Lazarenko was sent to Spain in 1936 as a Soviet adviser to the Spanish Republican Army during the Spanish Civil War, becoming senior adviser to the commander of the 5th Corps, Colonel Juan Modesto. After returning to the Soviet Union, he became the 38th Rifle Division's assistant commander in March 1938, but transferred to command of the Karelian Fortified Region in October 1939, shortly before the Soviet Union invaded Finland, beginning the Winter War. On 31 January 1940, the 42nd Rifle Division was formed from troops stationed in the fortified region, under Lazarenko's command. He led the division during the Soviet offensive on the Karelian Isthmus in the last months of the war. Promoted to major general on 4 June, Lazarenko continued to command the 42nd after it was transferred to Brest in the Western Special Military District in early 1941, becoming part of the 4th Army. From November 1940 to May 1941, he studied at the Frunze Military Academy's Higher Academic Courses.

== World War II ==
On 22 June 1941, Operation Barbarossa, the German invasion of the Soviet Union began. Under heavy artillery and air bombardment, Lazarenko managed to extricate the remnants of his division from the German assault, which encircled the remainder of the division that defended the Brest Fortress. The 42nd retreated to positions east of Brest, and after a fighting retreat exited the pocket at Bobruisk. On 4 July he was arrested, along with other Western Front commanders scapegoated for the defeats of the early days of the fighting, and was sentenced to death on 17 September. The sentence read: "despite having knowledge of the active preparations of the enemy for military operations, showing carelessness, he did not keep the troops on alert. In the first moments of the attack Lazarenko showed confusion and inaction, and, instead of taking action and repulsing the enemy, he went to the corps headquarters, leaving his units without proper guidance." On 29 September his sentence was suspended and instead changed to ten years in labor camps. Lazarenko was imprisoned in a camp in the Komi Autonomous Soviet Socialist Republic for slightly more than a year.

On 21 October 1942, Lazarenko was released from prison and sent to the front as deputy commander of the 146th Rifle Division with the rank of colonel. In January 1943 he was transferred to serve in the same position with the 50th Army's 413th Rifle Division, fighting on the Western Front. The 413th fought in the Third Rzhev–Sychevka Offensive in March, Operation Kutuzov, the Smolensk–Roslavl Offensive, and the Bryansk Offensive. On 24 October, as a result of proposals from front commander Konstantin Rokossovsky, the 50th Army's military tribunal removed the criminal conviction from Lazarenko's military record. He took command of the 369th Rifle Division on 16 November, and was restored to the rank of major general in 1944. From late June 1944, Lazarenko led the division in the Mogilev Offensive, part of Operation Bagration, the Soviet strategic offensive that recaptured Belarus and eastern Poland. Between 23 and 25 June, the 369th broke through heavily fortified German defenses, and crossed the Pronya and Basya Rivers, advancing 25 kilometers and inflicting heavy casualties. On 26 June, while directing his troops in the crossing of the Resta River four kilometers west of the village of Kholmy in Chavusy Raion, Lazarenko was killed when a German artillery shell scored a direct hit on his command vehicle.

Initially buried in Krichev, he was reinterred in Mogilev after its recapture on 28 June. On 21 July Lazarenko was posthumously awarded the title Hero of the Soviet Union and the Order of Lenin for his leadership of the division.

== Legacy ==
A square and a street in Mogilev were named for Lazarenko. In April 2010, on the proposal of the Chief Military Prosecutor of the Russian Federation, the Military Collegium of the Supreme Court of the Russian Federation quashed the indictment of 17 September 1941, stating that it "did not correspond to the facts of the case". The court deemed Lazarenko's actions on 22 June to have been consistent with the situation and orders from the corps headquarters.

== Personal life ==
Lazarenko married Polina Ivanovna and had a son, Grigory, who also fought in World War II.

== Notes ==
=== Bibliography ===
- Maslov, Aleksander A. (1998). Fallen Soviet Generals: Soviet General Officers Killed in Battle, 1941–1945. Translated by David Glantz. London: Frank Cass. ISBN 9780714647906.
- Tsapayev, D.A.; et al. (2015). Goremykin, V.P. (ed.). Великая Отечественная: Комдивы. Военный биографический словарь [The Great Patriotic War: Division Commanders. Military Biographical Dictionary] (in Russian). Vol. 4. Moscow: Kuchkovo Pole. ISBN 978-5-9950-0602-2.
