= 220th Rifle Division =

220th Motorized Division (March 11, 1941 – July 21, 1941); 220th Rifle Division (July 21, 1941 – July 1945)
- Active: 1941–1945
- Country: Soviet Union
- Branch: Red Army
- Type: Infantry
- Role: Motorized Infantry
- Size: Division
- Engagements: Operation Barbarossa; Battle of Smolensk (1941); Operation Typhoon; Battles of Rzhev; Operation Mars; Battle of Smolensk (1943); Orsha offensives (1943); Operation Bagration; Vitebsk–Orsha offensive; Minsk offensive; Goldap-Gumbinnen Operation; Vistula–Oder offensive; East Prussian Offensive; Prague Offensive
- Decorations: Order of the Red Banner; Order of Suvorov
- Battle honours: Orsha

Commanders
- Notable commanders: Maj. Gen. Nikifor Gordeevich Khoruzhenko; Lt. Col. Nikolai Georgievich Tsyganov; Maj. Gen. Stanislav Giliarovich Poplavskii; Maj. Gen. Vasilii Alekseevich Polevik; Col. Pyotr Selvestrovich Khaustovich

The 220th Rifle Division was briefly a Red Army motorized infantry division that was re-organised shortly after the German invasion as a standard rifle division.

It managed to avoid destruction during Operation Typhoon, but only its 653rd Rifle Regiment remained battleworthy through the winter. Once rebuilt it took part in the fighting around Rzhev in 1942 and then in the follow-up to the German evacuation of the salient in the spring of 1943. When the summer offensive toward Smolensk began in August it was part of Western Front's 31st Army and it remained in this Army almost continuously for the duration of the war. During the following autumn and winter it took part in the front's increasingly futile offensives on Orsha, but in the first stages of the Destruction of Army Group Center it assisted in the liberation of that town and was awarded its name as an honorific; its rifle regiments soon also gained honors for the liberation of Minsk. Less than two weeks later it also shared credit for the liberation of the city of Grodno and was awarded the Order of the Red Banner while several of its subunits were recognized for successfully crossing the Neman River nearby. After the abortive offensive into East Prussia in October it contributed to the capture of that province in early 1945 before being moved to 1st Ukrainian Front in April, and it ended the war in Czechoslovakia. Despite its solid combat record it was disbanded during the summer.

== 220th Motorized Division ==
The division was first organized beginning in March 1941 in the Oryol Military District at Voronezh as part of the 23rd Mechanized Corps. It was commanded by Maj. Gen. Nikifor Gordeevich Khoruzhenko and consisted of:

- 653rd Motorized Rifle Regiment
- 673rd Motorized Rifle Regiment
- 137th Tank Regiment
- 660th Artillery Regiment
- 46th Antitank Battalion
- 235th Antiaircraft Battalion
- 295th Reconnaissance Battalion
- 381st Light Engineering Battalion
- 584th Signal Battalion
- 218th Artillery Park Battalion
- 360th Medical/Sanitation Battalion
- 690th Motor Transport Battalion
- 166th Repair and Restoration Battalion
- 58th Regulatory Company
- 468th Chemical Defense (Anti-gas) Company
- 214th Field Postal Station
- 394th Field Office of the State Bank

When Operation Barbarossa began the 220th was still forming up and was very poorly equipped. Trucks and other motor vehicles were in short supply, and the tank regiment had no tanks at all, owing to the policy of the corps commander, Maj. Gen. M. A. Myasnikov, of concentrating nearly all of the available vehicles in his 48th and 51st Tank Divisions. For practical purposes the division was motorized in name only. On June 22 the corps, which also included the 27th Motorcycle Regiment, was still in the Oryol District and the 220th was located at Yelets, but by July 1 it had come under the command of 19th Army in the Reserve of the Supreme High Command. Within days the corps (minus the 51st Tanks which remained in the Reserve and deployed to Rzhev) was committed along with 19th Army as part of Western Front.

=== Battle of Vitebsk ===
By late on July 9 forces of 3rd Panzer Group had created a serious breach in the Red Army's defenses around Vitebsk. The front commander, Marshal S. K. Timoshenko, ordered 19th Army, commanded by Lt. Gen. I. S. Konev, to counterattack to restore the situation despite the fact it was not yet assembled. The 220th had arrived by rail despite the rest of 23rd Mechanized lagging in the rear. It took part in the counterattack the next day, which faltered after two days of heavy fighting due to the lack of coordination and reserves. By nightfall on July 12 both motorized corps of the Panzer Group were over the Dvina River and fanning out around Vitebsk. By this time the division was entirely separated from its Corps and was fighting in a salient east of Orsha. Timoshenko continued to attempt to retake Vitebsk with counterattacks that included the 220th, but these made no progress at all. The division soon saw fighting in the Smolensk region and on July 21 the pretense of it being a motorized unit was given up when it was redesignated as a standard rifle division with the addition of the 376th Reserve Rifle Regiment.

== 220th Rifle Division ==
Shortly after its redesignation the division was moved to the 32nd Army of Reserve Front, east of Smolensk, where it joined five militia (Opolcheniye) divisions from Moscow. General Khoruzhenko remained in command. Its order of battle, still based on the prewar shtat (table of organization and equipment), eventually became as follows:

- 376th Rifle Regiment (later 137th Rifle Regiment)
- 653rd Rifle Regiment
- 673rd Rifle Regiment
- 218th Light Artillery Regiment (until September 30, 1941)
- 660th Howitzer Artillery Regiment (until August 31, 1941; after September 30, 660th Artillery Regiment)
- 46th Antitank Battalion
- 435th Mortar Battalion (from October 26, 1941 to October 25, 1942)
- 489th Reconnaissance Company (later 295th)
- 381st Sapper Battalion
- 216th Signal Battalion (later 584th, later 216th Signal Company)
- 360th Medical/Sanitation Battalion
- 86th Chemical Defense (Anti-gas) Company (later 58th and 89th)
- 78th Motor Transport Company (later 690th Motor Transport Battalion)
- 330th Field Bakery (later 468th Motorized Field Bakery)
- 142nd Divisional Veterinary Hospital (later 110th)
- 10904th Field Postal Station (later 214th)
- 546th Field Office of the State Bank

=== Operation Typhoon ===
In August the 220th was moved to 49th Army, also in Reserve Front. At the beginning of October, when Operation Typhoon began, it was still under these commands, along with the 194th, 248th and 303rd Rifle Divisions plus the 29th and 31st Cavalry Divisions. The army was occupying a defensive line between Vyazma and Rzhev with its divisions spread along very wide sectors. As an example the 220th was deployed on a line from Valutino to Bulashovo that was 35 km (22 mi) in length. Owing to the advance of 2nd Panzer Group to the south, which began on September 30, the army received orders the next day to entrain for redeployment to this sector; the 220th was to depart from Sychyovka on October 4. This plan was entirely overtaken by events when 3rd Panzer Group began its own part of the offensive on October 2. The redeploying divisions were taken by surprise when German tanks of 6th Panzer Division seized two intact bridges over the Dniepr River east of Kholm-Zhirkovskii on October 3 and the next day also forced crossings in the sector of the 220th and 248th, brought 25-30 tanks over the river to the eastern bank and dug in around two small bridgeheads.

At 2300 hours on October 5 the STAVKA finally decided to begin the withdrawal of the forces of Western and Reserve Fronts to new lines. As part of this order all the units of 31st and 32nd Armies, plus the 220th, were transferred to Western Front. By this time the situation had deteriorated significantly. At 1150 hours on October 6 the commander of 32nd Army, Maj. Gen. S. V. Vishnevskii, reported about a German breakthrough on the Volochek–Pigulino sector:

My intended attack against this grouping with the 220th, 18th, 140th and 248th Rifle Divisions is developing slowly because of extremely heavy enemy air attacks. In the sector between the Dnepr and Viaz'ma Rivers, the 248th Rifle Division suddenly retreated... At present time, I have no information on how my order is being carried out by the commander of 220th Rifle Division, who on 6 October 1941 refused to carry out my attack order, alluding to an order from the 49th Army.

The order in question was that directing it to entrain at Sychyovka, which in the confusion had not been countermanded; General Khoruzhenko had also failed to receive his reassignment to Western Front. Meanwhile the division's Special Department, in accordance with previously issued orders, was continuing to purge "unreliable elements" from the ranks. For example, in place of the 673rd Rifle Regiment's 2nd Battalion, which consisted of "Westerners" (natives of the western districts of Belarus and Ukraine, who in difficult situations tended to surrender in large numbers) who'd been swept up and sent to the rear, it was necessary to form a new battalion from the personnel of the construction units and rear services.

At 1600 hours on October 7 General Vishnevskii reported that up to 10 German tanks had broken through in the Vysokoe area, pressuring the 18th Division while moving toward Sychyovka, and that a 30 km-wide (19 mi) gap had opened between it and the 140th. In addition the 248th was no longer combat effective. Given his difficulties in directing the 18th and 220th Divisions he recommended that they be resubordinated to 31st Army, which was done. (On October 13 this officer would be taken prisoner.) The same day the 7th Panzer Division of 3rd Group linked up with the 10th Panzer Division of 4th Panzer Group in the vicinity of Vyasma and the encirclement was closed.

==== Reorganization and Rebuilding ====
Remnants of the division were able to escape from encirclement to join 29th Army in Kalinin Front by October 10. The 653rd Rifle Regiment was least affected by these events, and fought detached from the rest of the division in 22nd Army through the winter and into the spring; the remainder was kept in reserve in 29th and 30th Armies. In May 1942, the 220th went into Kalinin Front reserves to be rebuilt. On May 4 Khoruzhenko left the division. He would go on to lead the 15th Guards Rifle Corps and reached the rank of lieutenant general. He was replaced by Lt. Col. Nikolai Georgievich Tsyganov, who had previously served as commander of the 376th Rifle Regiment and as divisional chief of staff. This officer would later lead the 11th Guards Rifle Division and reached the rank of colonel general postwar. Tsyganov was in turn replaced by Col. Stanislav Giliarovich Poplavskii on July 3; he had previously commanded the 256th Rifle Division and would be promoted to major general on February 14, 1943.

== Battles for Rzhev ==
The division, now back in 30th Army, took part in the First Rzhev–Sychyovka Offensive Operation, fighting in the northeast outskirts of Rzhev itself in the late summer and autumn of 1942. Units of the army reached the Volga 5–6 km (3.1–3.7 mi) west of Rzhev on August 25–26 and forced a crossing on the 29th, but over the following weeks it was unable to seize the town. In order to facilitate cooperation the army was transferred to Western Front, but this made little difference. Further attacks followed on September 14 and September 21, but only a few blocks of the town were taken, at considerable cost to both sides. 30th Army went over to the defense on October 1.

=== Operation Mars ===
In the late stages of Operation Mars, after the Red Army attacks had failed on all other sectors, the 39th Army was still making limited gains in its diversionary efforts in the Molodoi Tud sector northeast of Olenino. By the second week of December Army Gen. G. K. Zhukov was looking for any success anywhere in his collapsing offensive and on December 8 ordered his 39th and 30th Armies once again to crush the enemy Olenino grouping, while the 30th was also to break through on a sector from Koshkino to Burgovo and capture Rzhev by the 23rd. In preparation the 375th Rifle Division, with the 380th and 220th in support, pounded the German defenses south of the Volga. From December 9 to 12 this effort failed to make any progress, while 39th Army had gained some ground near the village of Gonchuki. Therefore the 220th and 16th Guards Rifle Divisions were transferred to this sector. The two divisions attacked at midday on December 13 following an immense four-hour artillery preparation and just as an encircled Soviet tank group struck the German rear. This produced enough of a rupture of the defenses that the tanks were able to escape, but otherwise failed. A further effort was made the next day, supported by artillery and mortar fire plus the remaining vehicles of the tank group, and produced another minor breakthrough but this was contained and eliminated on the 15th. The 375th was brought in the next day to join the assault, but this made little difference and Zhukov finally allowed the army to go over to the defense on December 23.

Beginning on February 25, 1943 the 220th launched a joint attack with the 369th Rifle Division against the defenses of the 251st and 87th Infantry Divisions along the river west of Rzhev which managed to seize a bridgehead on its southern bank. This led to speculation in the German command that the STAVKA was aware of its plan to withdraw from the salient. M. A. Burlatov, who commanded the sanitation platoon of the 360th Medical/Sanitation Battalion, wrote on March 3:

... there was a certain strange silence. There was not a sound, either from the direction of the Germans, or from our side. Gradually the soldiers began to clamber out of the trenches and shelters; such brave hearts slowly but steadily grew in number. Just then I heard a shout: "Fritz has skedaddled!"

Beginning that day it joined in the liberation of Rzhev as the German Ninth Army withdrew from the salient (Operation Büffel). 30th Army pursued the German forces as best it could through the devastated territory and the spring rasputitsa, coming to a halt against a new German fortified line at the base of the former salient on March 31. The later commander of the 220th, Vasilii Alekseevich Polevik, summarized the March battles: "The division coped with its assigned task. But the losses were significant."

== Advance to Smolensk ==
From April to early August the 220th rested, replenished and fortified its positions in anticipation of a German summer offensive. In April it was moved back to 31st Army; apart from one brief reassignment to 68th Army in September it would remain in this Army for the duration of the war. In June it was subordinated to the 45th Rifle Corps along with the 88th and 331st Rifle Divisions. On June 8 General Poplavskii handed the division to Colonel Polevik. The former took command of 45th Corps and later led the 2nd Polish Army; the latter would be promoted to the rank of major general on July 15, 1944.

=== Battle Along the Vop ===
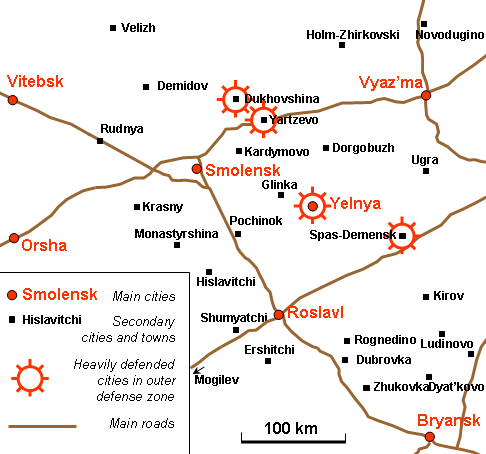
General layout of the Smolensk region during the battle

Following the German defeat at Kursk, Kalinin and Western Fronts prepared their own offensive through the Smolensk land bridge to liberate that city; Operation Suvorov began on August 7. The only real Soviet success on the first day was achieved by 31st Army against the XXXIX Panzer Corps in the Yartsevo sector. The main effort was made by the 36th Rifle Corps with 45th Corps (220th and 331st Divisions) and 42nd Guards Tank Brigade in support. This attack started later in the day than elsewhere and did not gather real steam until late in the day; 36th Corps was operating west of the Vop River while 45th was on the east side. It struck the inexperienced 113th Infantry Division, which had only been at the front for two weeks. The artillery preparation had been unusually effective because communication lines had not been buried deeply enough. Between 1800 and 2000 hours the 45th Corps overran II Battalion of Grenadier Regiment 261 in the center of the division's front and II Battalion of Grenadier Regiment 260 which was blocking a north-south road just east of the Vop. By 2100 hours infantry of the corps managed to overrun a battery of the division's artillery regiment and the 113th's front was breaking apart. During the night both German infantry regiments fell back 2 km (1.2 mi) where their main battle line was re-established behind the Vedosa River. The army commander, Maj. Gen. V. A. Gluzdovskii, now committed his mobile group in an effort to reach the Minsk–Moscow highway. Only the arrival of reserves from XXXIX Corps managed to stabilize the situation.

The next day the 45th Corps attacked at 1300 hours and overran the Veste Coburg (Hill 216.6) position of the main battle line and effective collapsed Grenadier Regiment 260. The 220th surged into the gap just east of the Vop in pursuit. Two hours later the lead elements of 18th Panzergrenadier Division, the reserve formation of 4th Army, arrived at Manchino to launch a counterattack. It encountered German troops from the 260th, some half-naked and most without weapons, retreating in panic. When efforts to halt the rout failed the 18th had no option but to try to fill the vacuum created by this collapse, taking up positions south of the Vedosa to prevent a complete breakthrough. In the morning of August 9 the 18th mounted its counterattack to re-establish the lost position but was repulsed with heavy losses. In three days of fighting the 113th had suffered more than 1,700 casualties and while the 18th blocked any further Soviet advance it had lost over 1,500 was now tied to this sector. By August 15 Western Front had expended almost all of its artillery ammunition and rainy weather had set in, forcing a suspension of the offensive on August 21.

31st and 5th Armies returned to battle on August 28 with the objective of reaching Yartsevo and Dorogobuzh. In the morning of September 1 the latter was occupied by 5th Army, but 31st Army only managed to push back the 252nd Infantry Division as logistics continued to be an issue. By September 3 the XXXIX Corps was still holding east of Yartsevo and on the 7th the offensive was suspended again. During each of these suspensions the 220th was pulled back into second echelon for replenishment, a total of four times during Suvorov. Finally, on September 25, Smolensk was liberated.

== Orsha Offensives ==
At the beginning of October the 220th was serving as a separate division in 68th Army but later that month it returned to 45th Corps in 31st Army, after briefly joining 36th Corps of the same Army. It had just been assigned on October 3 when the army began a joint attack with 5th Army along the Smolensk–Orsha highway against the 197th Infantry Division of XXVII Army Corps. 36th Corps assaulted westward in the sector between Ordovka and Ermaki north of the highway, unhinging the defense and driving German units through the latter village. Under heavy pressure over the following days the 197th was forced to withdraw on October 9, and again on October 11, reaching a line from the Verkhita River to the Dniepr, roughly 20 km (12 mi) east of Orsha. General Gluzdovskii was now ordered to pause before renewing the attack the next day.

Gluzdovskii now deployed his reinforced army astride the highway with 36th Corps to the north, 71st Rifle Corps to the south, and 45th Corps plus the 220th in second echelon. The front began with an artillery preparation that lasted 85 minutes but failed to take the German forces by surprise. The army's shock groups were stalled almost immediately without any appreciable gains and a further effort the next day did no better. After a regrouping the offensive recommenced on October 21, at which time the 220th was again under 45th Corps command. The corps was deployed astride both the highway and the nearby rail line in the center of the army's sector. This was preceded by an artillery preparation of two hours and ten minutes, and the army's lead divisions punched through the 197th Infantry's first defensive line; the 220th was again in second echelon. The force penetrated up to 4 km (2.5 mi) on a 1,000 m (3,300 ft) front, but German reserves soon halted the effort to exploit with the 2nd Guards Tank Corps. On October 24 the second echelon divisions were committed in what turned out to be a final effort to achieve a breakthrough. The army managed to reach Kireeva at the cost of heavy casualties from German artillery and mortar fire which again could not be adequately replied to due to supply shortages. The offensive was shut down on October 26, by which time the 31st and 10th Guards Armies had jointly suffered 19,102 casualties, including 4,787 killed.

In early November Western Front prepared for another attempt to break through the German defenses. The front's first shock group consisted of the 10th Guards and 31st Armies on both sides of the Orsha highway, but by now their rifle divisions averaged only 4,500 personnel each. 45th Corps, south of Kireevo, faced the 119th Panzergrenadier Regiment of 25th Panzergrenadier Division. The 220th was in the second echelon when the attack began on November 14 after a three-and-a-half hour artillery and air preparation, but was soon stopped in its tracks due to heavy machine gun fire. The fighting continued over the next four days but 45th Corps gained no more than 400m at considerable cost. The STAVKA, however, ordered the offensive to continue, which it did beginning on November 30 after another regrouping. 31st and 10th Guards Armies were concentrated on a 12 km-wide (7.5 mi) sector from Osintori to the Dniepr, with the 31st focused on just 3 km (1.9 mi) of that with four divisions in first echelon and five in the second. In the event the attack made virtually no ground even after the second echelon was brought up, and the front went over to the defense on December 5. 10th Guards Army was soon relieved for redeployment to another sector and 65th Guards Rifle Division's defensive sector was taken over by the 653rd Rifle Regiment. The failure of the Orsha offensives was ascribed, apart from the strength of the German defenses, to a lack of training of Red Army replacements and a stereotyped use of artillery which did more to warn the German forces of attacks than to actually inflict damage. During December the STAVKA ordered Western Front to shift its efforts towards Vitebsk.

=== Babinavichy Offensive ===
At the start of the new year the 220th, one of just four divisions remaining in 31st Army, had been assigned to the 71st Corps with the 331st Division. It was still under these commands at the start of February, when the front began planning a new offensive along an axis north of Babinavichy. Gluzdovskii was to form a shock group consisting of the 220th, 42nd and 251st Rifle Divisions to advance northwestward along the north bank of the Luchesa River to smash the defenses of the VI Army Corps' 256th Infantry Division and outflank the German grouping around Vysochany from the south. The offensive was set to begin on February 22 with the 220th and 251st in the first echelon and the 42nd Guards Tank Brigade in support. The assault fairly easily tore a 5 km-wide (3.1 mi) gap in the forward defenses of the 256th Infantry and by day's end the division had penetrated to a depth of 1,000m and captured the village of Vospintsy before its attack faltered on the outskirts of Ryzhiki and the second German defensive position along the Vitebsk–Babinavichy road. Once again sparse German reserves were able to contain the advance even though it persisted into March. During its course 31st Army lost another 5,767 casualties, including 1,288 dead.

The army regrouped once again in early March for another drive on Orsha. The 220th and 251st were moved south through the mud of the spring rasputitsa to back up the 331st Division, which was facing the 78th Assault Division. The attack began on March 5 but made only minimal gains and the commitment of the 220th and 192nd Rifle Divisions the next day made no difference; the offensive collapsed in failure by March 9.

By this time the division was so worn down that each rifle regiment had only two rifle battalions, and each battalion had only two rifle companies and a sub-machinegun platoon. This was just 40 percent of approved strength in infantry, but the 660th Artillery Regiment was at full strength and was fully motorized with a mix of Lend-Lease and Soviet vehicles. During the final years of the war, the Red Army increasingly substituted firepower for manpower, and many rifle divisions remained combat effective with these strengths.

== Operation Bagration ==
In April the 31st Army became part of the 3rd Belorussian Front when Western Front was split up. As part of the regrouping prior to the summer offensive, 36th Rifle Corps was moved to the south bank of the Dniepr by the army's new commander, Lt. Gen. V. V. Glagolev. He planned to launch his main attack with 36th and 71st Corps along a 39 km-wide (24 mi) front from Kireeva to Zastenok Yurev in the general direction of Dubrowna and Orsha along both banks of the Dniepr in conjunction with 11th Guards Army. The two Corps were largely opposed by the 25th Panzergrenadiers. 36th Corps (220th, 173rd and 352nd Rifle Divisions) was to break through the defense between the Dniepr and height 215.2 and capture the line Pashino–Bolshoe Bakhovo by the end of the second day. The 220th and 352nd were in first echelon while the 173rd was assigned to the army reserve.

The preliminary operation, effectively a reconnaissance-in-force, took place on June 22 but the forward detachments of 31st Army made no progress in the face of powerful artillery and mortar fire and the first German defensive zone remained intact. When the main offensive began the following day and the two Corps were able to break this first line and advance up to 3 km (1.9 mi) into the depth of the defense but were halted around 1300 hours as resistance increased. Stubborn fighting continued through June 24 and the army gained only another 1,000-1,500m as elements of 78th Assault reinforced the sector. The next day 71st Corps, north of the Dniepr, completed its breakthrough of the main defensive zone as German forces began falling back toward Orsha and 11th Guards Army started outflanking it to the north. After an advance of up to 27 km (17 mi) by 36th Corps the battle for the city itself began on June 26 and it was cleared by 0700 hours the next day; the 220th was awarded a battle honor for its role:

ORSHA - ...220th Rifle Division (Col. Polevik, Vasilii Alekseevich)... By order of the Supreme High Command of 27 June 1944 and a commendation in Moscow, the troops who participated in the battles for the liberation of Orsha are given a salute of 20 artillery salvoes from 224 guns.

=== Minsk Offensive ===
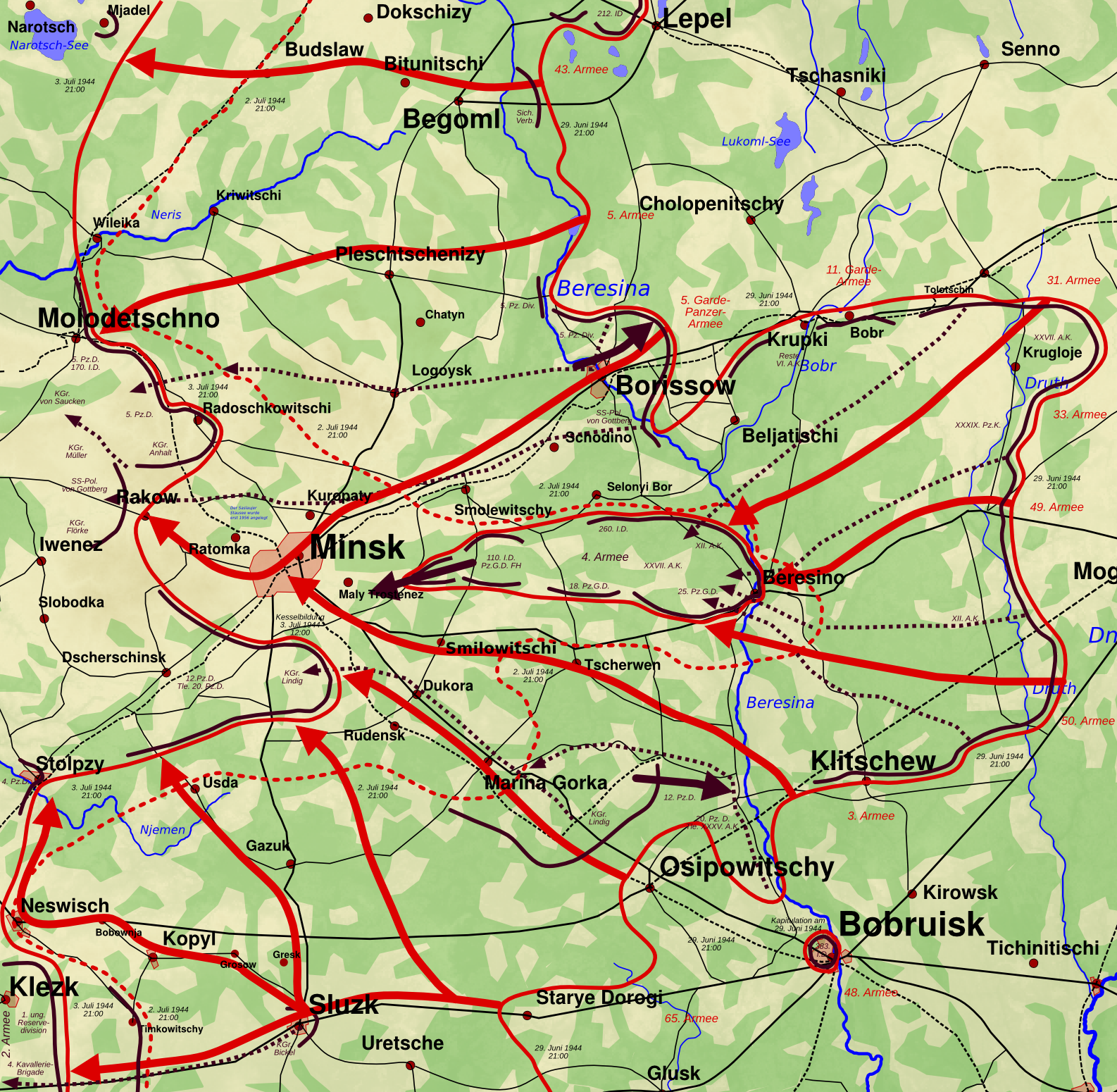
Minsk Offensive June 29-July 3. Note initial position of 31st Army.

After the fall of Orsha the 31st Army began a full pursuit of the defeated German forces in an effort to prevent them escaping over the Berezina River, which was reached by the end of June 28. German 4th Army was now deeply enveloped from the north and was facing destruction as it attempted to pull back to Minsk. The Belarusian capital was soon liberated and in consequence each of the 220th's rifle regiments were awarded honorifics:

MINSK - ...376th Rifle Regiment (Lt. Colonel Guguev, Yurii Petrovich) ...653rd Rifle Regiment (Colonel Skovorodkin, Igor Viktorovich) ...673rd Rifle Regiment (Lt. Colonel Danenkov, Kuzma Danilovich)... By order of the Supreme High Command of 3 July 1944 and a commendation in Moscow, the troops who participated in the battles for the liberation of Minsk are given a salute of 24 artillery salvoes from 324 guns.

Later that month the division participated in the liberation of Grodno, near the border with Poland, and was awarded the Order of the Red Banner. For his leadership during the fighting near Grodno, political officer Cpt. Kirill Akimovich Koshman of the 376th Rifle Regiment was named a Hero of the Soviet Union. Koshman had already distinguished himself in the fighting for the German airstrip at Rzhev in the summer of 1942. He also provided leadership in the pursuit of 9th Army from the salient in March 1943 and in August in the fighting near Yartsevo, during which he was wounded by a mortar shell fragment which happened to strike the Order of the Red Star decoration on his chest. On July 12 the Regiment forced a crossing of the Neman River just north of Grodno. Koshman helped lead the defense of the bridgehead over the next three days which saw 18 unsuccessful counterattacks by tanks and infantry. He was awarded his Gold Star on March 24, 1945 and went on to serve postwar, reaching the rank of colonel before his retirement in 1961.

As a result of the battle for the Neman crossing the 660th Artillery Regiment received its name as a battle honor while on August 12 the 376th was awarded the Order of the Red Banner, the 653rd and 673rd each received the Order of Alexander Nevsky, and the 381st Sapper Battalion won the Order of the Red Star.

== Advance into Germany ==
In late October the 31st Army took part in the Goldap-Gumbinnen Operation along with most of the rest of 3rd Belorussian Front. Elements of the army captured Goldap on October 28 but were soon forced back out of it. Despite this reverse, on November 14 the 653rd Rifle Regiment would be granted the Order of the Red Banner with the 376th and 673rd Regiments would each receive the Order of Suvorov, 3rd Degree.

=== East Prussian Offensives ===
During October the 220th had been moved to 71st Corps, rejoining the 88th and 331st Divisions. General Polevik left the division on November 8 due to illness. He was briefly replaced by Maj. Gen. Ivan Aleksandrovich Sevastyanov, the deputy commander of 36th Corps, then by the divisional chief of staff, Col. Grigorii Fyodorovich Kobylkin, until Col. Pyotr Selvestrovich Khaustovich took command on November 26. He would remain in command for the duration.

The second attempt to destroy the German forces in East Prussia began on January 12, 1945. The objective of 3rd Belorussian Front was much as before: to penetrate the defenses north of the Masurian Lakes in the Insterburg region and then advance to launch a frontal attack on Königsberg. 31st Army remained on the front's left flank and in the early going was ordered to firmly defend the front south of Goldap. The army went over to the offensive on January 22 and by the next day the German grouping facing it was in retreat. During that day the corps captured the important road junction of Benkheim while the army developed the offensive toward Angerburg and Lötzen, advancing more than 45 km (28 mi) before storming the heavily fortified strongpoint at the former location. The advance continued during the following days and on January 31 the division helped to take Heilsberg and Friedland. On April 5 the 673rd Regiment would be recognized for its role in this fighting with the Order of the Red Banner, the 653rd with the Order of Suvorov, 3rd Degree, while the 376th Rifle and 660th Artillery Regiments were each awarded the Order of Alexander Nevsky.

31st Army resumed its offensive on February 2 and soon captured the major road junction of Landsberg. However this was a crucial point for the German forces attempting to break out of the pocket that was forming around Königsberg. The 129th Infantry and 558th Grenadier and 24th Panzer Divisions launched powerful counterattacks in an effort to encircle the 71st Corps and while they were unable to break into Landsberg they isolated it for several days, bypassing to the north and south and causing considerable havoc in the Soviet rear areas. Once communications were restored the corps continued its advance in the direction of Kanditten. Later that month the 220th was transferred to the 44th Rifle Corps, where it would remain for the duration. On April 26 the division was awarded the Order of Suvorov, 2nd Degree, for its part in defeating the encircled German troops southwest of Königsberg.

== Postwar ==
In April it was shifted with 31st Army south to 1st Ukrainian Front, and then took part in the last Soviet offensive of the war in Europe, towards Prague, from May 6–11. The division ended the war in Czechoslovakia, rounding up fugitives of the defeated German Army Group Center east of the city. It now carried the full title of 220th Rifle, Orsha, Order of the Red Banner, Order of Suvorov Division. (Russian: 220-я стрелковая Оршанская Краснознамённая ордена Суворова дивизия.) The division was disbanded "in place" along with the corps with the Central Group of Forces in the summer of 1945.

In his memoirs, Marshal I. S. Konev praised the performance of the 220th Rifle Division during the Battles for Rzhev, where the division had served as part of his Kalinin Front in 1942.
