= 369th Rifle Division =

369th Rifle Division (August 1, 1941 – July, 1945)
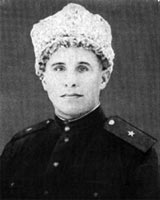
- Maj. Gen. I. S. Lazarenko, Hero of the Soviet Union
- Active: 1941–1945
- Country: Soviet Union
- Branch: Red Army
- Type: Division
- Role: Infantry
- Engagements: Battles of Rzhev; Sychyovka-Vyazma Offensive; First Rzhev–Sychyovka Offensive Operation; Operation Kutuzov; Battle of Smolensk (1943); Novyi Bykhov - Propoisk Offensive; Operation Bagration; Minsk Offensive; Osovets Offensive; Vistula-Oder Offensive; Battle of Berlin
- Decorations: Order of the Red Banner
- Battle honours: Karachev

Commanders
- Notable commanders: Lt. Col. Emelyan Ivanovich Vasilenko; Col. Gavrill Ivanovich Fisenko; Lt. Col. Aleksei Pavlovich Golovko; Col. Mikhail Zurabovich Kazishvili; Maj. Gen. Ivan Vasilevich Khazov; Maj. Gen. Ivan Sidorovich Lazarenko; Col. Pyotr Semyonovich Galaiko; Col. Aleksandr Aleksandrovich Fedotov; Col. Ivan Andreevich Golubev

The 369th Rifle Division began forming on August 1, 1941, as a standard Red Army rifle division, in the Chelyabinsk Oblast. After forming, it was assigned to the 39th Army which soon became part of Kalinin Front, and it participated in the near-encirclement of the German 9th Army around Rzhev in the winter counteroffensive of 1941–42. In late January, 1942, it was transferred to the 29th Army of the same Front, which was very soon after encircled by German forces near Sychevka, and while it was written off by German intelligence in February, enough of the division escaped that it was not officially disbanded. By August it returned to battle, now in 30th Army of Western Front, still fighting near Rzhev. After the salient was finally evacuated in the spring of 1943 the division was moved to Bryansk Front, first in 11th Army and then in 50th Army, under which it served for most of the war. In the summer counteroffensive the 369th was awarded the battle honor "Karachev" for its part in the liberation of that city. At the start of Operation Bagration the division was in 2nd Belorussian Front and its commander, Maj. Gen. I. S. Lazarenko, was killed a few days later; despite this loss it was awarded the Order of the Red Banner for its successful crossing of the Dniepr River and the liberation of Mogilev. The division continued to advance through Belarus and into Poland and eastern Germany over the following months, but despite a fine record of service was disbanded soon after the German surrender.

== Formation ==
The division began forming on August 1, 1941, at Kurgan in the Urals Military District in the Chelyabinsk Oblast. Its basic order of battle was as follows:

- 1223rd Rifle Regiment
- 1225th Rifle Regiment
- 1227th Rifle Regiment
- 929th Artillery Regiment

Lt. Col. Emelyan Ivanovich Vasilenko was assigned to command of the division on the day it began forming, but he was replaced in mid-September by Lt. Col. Gavrill Ivanovich Fisenko; this officer would be promoted to full colonel on November 28. In that month it was still in the Urals when it was assigned to 39th Army and began moving towards the front. By late December 39th Army had been assigned to Kalinin Front. By this time, after nearly a month of counteroffensive against German Army Group Center, the rifle divisions of Kalinin Front averaged less than 3,700 men, so the 369th was a welcome reinforcement.

Beginning on January 8, 1942, 39th Army took part in the Sychevka-Vyasma Offensive Operation, which was planned "to encircle, and then capture or destroy the enemy's entire Mozhaisk - Gzhatsk - Vyasma grouping", that is, what later became known as the Rzhev salient. At the end of January the 369th was transferred to the 29th Army, still in Kalinin Front, attacking towards Sychevka. Within days forces of the German 9th Army encircled 29th Army. Over the next six weeks the Army struggled behind enemy lines, attempting to reestablish communications or at least to break out. Although the 369th was counted as destroyed by German intelligence in February, enough men escaped that it was not officially disbanded, but it would spend months recovering from the ordeal. Colonel Fisenko was replaced in command by Lt. Col. Aleksei Pavlovich Golovko at the end of February, who was in turn replaced by Col. Mikhail Zurabovich Kazishvili on May 9, while the division was rebuilding.

== Continued Service ==
The 369th returned to the front in August, now in 30th Army of Kalinin Front, where it took part in the latter stages of the First Rzhev–Sychyovka Offensive Operation to the north and east of Rzhev itself:

"In the Kalinin Front's journal of combat operations for 23 August 1942, it was noted: 'The 30th Army commander decided to go on the offensive... with the assignment to destroy the enemy's Rzhev grouping in concert with the 29th Army and to take Rzhev.'"

While this offensive did gain some ground east of the city, Rzhev never fell, and the August fighting cost 30th Army more than 80,000 casualties. By the beginning of September the Army was reassigned to Western Front.

The division served on an inactive sector during Operation Mars and saw little action. In the run-up to the German evacuation of the salient, which was to begin on March 1, 1943, the 369th and 220th Rifle Divisions struck the defenses of German 9th Army's 251st and 87th Infantry Divisions along the Volga River west of Rzhev on February 25 and managed to seize a bridgehead on the southern bank, leading to speculation that the Soviet forces were expecting the German move. In the event, Western and Kalinin Fronts mostly followed up the evacuation over the coming month. On March 9, Colonel Kazishvili handed his command to Maj. Gen. Ivan Vasilevich Khazov.

In April the division was moved to the Reserve of the Supreme High Command for a further rebuilding, assigned to 11th Army. It returned to the front in July with that Army as part of Bryansk Front, in 53rd Rifle Corps. During Operation Kutuzov in August the division was reassigned briefly to 46th Rifle Corps, and while serving in this unit took part in the liberation of Karachev on August 15, for which it was awarded the name of that city as an honorific. In September the division was again reassigned, this time to 50th Army, where it would remain for most of the rest of the war.

== Into Belarus ==
As of October 1 the 369th had returned to 46th Rifle Corps, and 50th Army had been moved to Central Front, which became Belorussian Front later that month. On November 16, General Khazov was replaced in command by Col. Ivan Sidorovich Lazarenko, who had been serving as deputy commander of the 413th Rifle Division for nearly a year. In the last week of that month, the 3rd and 50th Armies, and part of the 10th, began the Novyi Bykhov - Propoisk Offensive across the Sozh River. The 369th was on its Army's right flank, linking with 10th Army just south of Petukhovka. The joint attack began on the 25th, across the Pronya River on this sector, and the division penetrated German defenses, turned the left flank of the 260th Infantry Division, and liberated the villages of Kuzminichi and Khomenki, 3–5 km (1.9–3.1 mi) deep in the German rear area. This advance, combined with the successes of 3rd Army and the rest of 50th Army to the south, left the German forces with no alternative to a retreat westwards. By late on November 30, 50th Army had closed up to a new defense line from Chavusy diagonally to the Dniepr River at Novyi Bykhov.

On January 4, 1944, a new offensive aimed at Bykhov and Chavusy was launched by elements of 3rd, 50th and 10th Armies. Under the plan for this offensive, 46th Corps was to be on call to exploit if it proved successful. While important gains were made, there was no breakthrough, in part due to the rifle divisions of all three armies numbering roughly 3,500 men each, and the 369th saw little action before the attack was suspended on January 8. In late March the commander of what was now designated 1st Belorussian Front, Army Gen. K. K. Rokossovsky, produced a plan to eliminate the German bridgehead over the Dniepr, based on Mogilev. 50th Army formed a shock group based on 46th and 121st Rifle Corps, but the 369th was assigned a flank support role. In the event the attack, which began on March 25, collapsed after minimal gains and was called off on March 31. During this battle the division was shifted to the 42nd Rifle Corps, and when 50th Army was moved to 2nd Belorussian Front in April the division joined 121st Rifle Corps.

=== Operation Bagration ===
In the buildup to the summer offensive the 369th was moved to the much-expanded 49th Army, in the same Front, and when the offensive began it was in the 62nd Rifle Corps. In the initial phase the main objective of 49th Army was Mogilev. In the evening of June 25 units of the German 12th Infantry Division were strenuously resisting the division's advance with heavy fire from prepared defenses. At 0200 hrs. on June 26 the division forced a crossing of the Vasya River under heavy fire, and advanced to the east bank of the Resta River by the end of the day. During heavy fighting near the village of Kholm, Lazarenko, who had been promoted to major general earlier in the year, was killed in action. He was replaced the next day by Col. Pyotr Semyonovich Galaiko. On July 21 Lazarenko was posthumously made a Hero of the Soviet Union.

The battle continued on June 27, during which 2nd Belorussian Front cleared the entire east bank of the Dniepr, while 49th Army crossed the river both north and south of Mogilev. A gap opened between the German 110th Infantry Division and the city's defenders, allowing the Army's engineers to build a 16-tonne and 30-tonne bridge across the Dniepr. The 369th and 290th Rifle Divisions, along with 50th Army's 121st Corps, followed the 23rd Guards Tank Brigade and the 1434th Self-Propelled Gun Regiment (SU-85s) across the river and struck Mogilev from the northwest, which led to street fighting during the night. By evening this bridgehead was 25 km (16 mi) deep, halfway to the Drut River.

Mogilev was liberated on June 28, and at about this time the 369th left 62nd Corps to become a separate division in 49th Army. Over the following week it joined the pursuit of the remnants of German 4th Army, which were soon encircled east of Minsk. On July 9, 49th Army was tasked with the elimination of this pocket. The 369th, along with 38th Rifle Corps and four other separate rifle divisions, plus three NKVD border regiments, were to methodically comb through the forested areas east of the city with light air support. This operation ended on July 13 and while it was going on, on July 10 the division was awarded the Order of the Red Banner for its role in the forcing of the Pronya and Dniepr and the liberation of the cities of Mogilev, Shklov and Bykhov earlier in the campaign. On September 1 the 1227th Rifle Regiment was decorated with the Order of Aleksandr Nevsky for its part in the Osovets Offensive.

== Into Germany ==
After the mopping-up operation the 369th returned to 50th Army, initially in 69th Rifle Corps. Through the remainder of 1944, as it advanced through Belarus and into Poland, it was moved from this Corps to 81st Rifle Corps and back again. The 1227th Rifle Regiment was awarded the Order of Aleksandr Nevsky on September 1 for its role in the fighting for Osowiec and its fortifications. On October 13 Colonel Galaiko handed his command to Col. Aleksandr Aleksandrovich Fedotov. Prior to the Vistula-Oder Offensive, on December 29, 50th Army was ordered to move the division to 2nd Belorussian Front reserves at Zambrów; however, later orders kept the division in Army reserves. The offensive began on January 14, 1945, but 50th Army remained holding its previous line for the first few days. On January 20, 50th Army was again ordered to transfer the 369th into Front reserve, to be concentrated by the morning of the 22nd at Maków Mazowiecki. As of February 1 the division remained in Front reserve.

Near the end of January the 70th Army and other elements of the Front had encircled the fortress of Toruń on the Vistula River with the 136th Rifle Division and a regiment of the 71st Rifle Division. This was considered sufficient as the garrison was believed to be 3,000 - 4,000 men. In fact, there were ten times that number, and on the night of January 30/31 they began to break out to the northwest, soon breaking through by sheer weight of numbers in the direction of the 70th Army headquarters at Unisław. The headquarters was forced to displace, which disrupted communications in the Army. Meanwhile, the 369th and 330th, the two Front reserve divisions, were directed towards Unisław where they came under 70th Army command on February 3. By the end of February 8 nearly all of the escaping German forces had been mopped up. The 369th would remain in 70th Army, in the 96th Rifle Corps, for the duration of the war.

After a brief halt and a regrouping 70th Army was ordered to resume the offensive on February 22 in the direction of Konarzyny, Reinwasser and Bartin. On March 3, Colonel Fedotov was removed from command due to excessive casualties suffered by the division in the February fighting, including the liberation of Tuchola on February 15; he was replaced by Col. Ivan Andreevich Golubev, who would remain in command for the duration. Later in the month the main objective of 2nd Belorussian Front was the group of German forces in Gdańsk and Gdynia. On March 23, 70th Army, with the help of flanking forces of other armies, broke through the German defenses and captured the town of Sopot and reached the shore of Gdańsk Bay. 96th Corps was then directed northwards, towards Kolibken, south of Gdynia. In the course of the next five days the 369th and its Corps assisted 19th Army in the liberation of this city.

=== The Berlin Operation ===
70th Army was one of the three combined-arms armies in 2nd Belorussian Front that helped form its shock group at the start of the assault on Berlin. At this time the division had somewhere between 3,600 and 4,800 men. The Army was deployed along a 14 km (8.7 mi) front, but the breakthrough sector was 4 km (2.5 mi) wide along the West Oder River in the area of Mescherin. The 369th was in the first echelon of 96th Corps with 165th Rifle Division. 3rd Guards Tank Corps was subordinated to 70th Army for the operation. During April 18–19 the Front launched intensive reconnaissance efforts in preparation for the crossings, including the elimination of German advance parties in the lowlands between the East and West Oder. The division designated a reinforced rifle regiment to this task. Over these two days the Army's first echelon took up positions on the east bank of the West Oder, and at one location had managed to create a small bridgehead on the west bank.

The front's full offensive began on April 20. 70th Army continued fighting to cross the West Oder into the night of April 21–22. At 1100 hrs. on the 22nd it resumed its attack, having beaten off 16 counterattacks, and advanced as much as 2–3 km (1.2–1.9 mi). By the end of the day 96th Corps had reached the Stettin - Harz highway. By the end of the next day the Corps had advanced as far as Geesow and Hohenreinkendorf, 6 km (3.7 mi) from the riverbank. The advance continued on the 24th, gaining as much as 8 km (5.0 mi), and 96th Corps reached Luckow and Petershagen. On the following day 70th Army beat off eight German attacks, captured Penkun, and advanced 15 km (9.3 mi), completing the breakthrough of the Oder defensive line, while 96th Corps reached the northern outskirts of Blumberg and Kasekow.

70th Army resumed its offensive on the morning of April 26 and forced a crossing of the Randow River, the German second defensive zone, along its entire front. It then advanced 6–8 km (3.7–5.0 mi) farther. On the following day, with the backing of 3rd Guards Tank Corps, the army advanced flat-out to the west, covering as much as 30 km (19 mi), and 96th Corps ended the day in the defile between the Sternhagener See and Grosser Potzlowsee. Through the period from April 28 to May 5 the further advance was only opposed by small covering detachments seeking in any way to slow down the offensive. On May 3 contact was made with British Second Army east of Wismar and the next day reached the Baltic in the Warnemunde sector, where the 369th ended the war.

== Postwar ==
Following the German surrender, the men and women of the division shared the full title of 369th Rifle, Karachev, Order of the Red Banner Division (Russian: 369-я стрелковая Карачевская Краснознамённая дивизия). On June 29, Col. Savelii Alekseevich Sviderskii, commander of the 1225th Rifle Regiment, and Lt. Col. Vasilii Fyodorovich Morozov, commander of the 1227th Rifle Regiment, were both made Heroes of the Soviet Union. According to STAVKA Order No. 11096 of May 29, 1945, part 8, the 369th is listed as one of the rifle divisions to be "disbanded in place". It was disbanded in accordance with the directive in July 1945.
