= 413th Rifle Division =

413th Rifle Division (August 6, 1941 – 1946)
- Active: 1941–1946
- Country: Soviet Union
- Branch: Red Army
- Type: Division
- Role: Infantry
- Engagements: Battle of Moscow; Defense of Tula; Operation Büffel; Operation Kutuzov; Battle of Smolensk (1943); Battle of the Dniepr; Novyi Bykhov - Propoisk Offensive; Bykhov-Chausy Offensive; Rogachev-Zhlobin Offensive; Operation Bagration; Lublin-Brest Offensive; Vistula-Oder Offensive; East Pomeranian Offensive; Battle of Berlin
- Decorations: Order of the Red Banner; Order of Suvorov
- Battle honours: Brest

Commanders
- Notable commanders: Maj. Gen. Alexei Dmitrievich Tereshkov; Maj. Gen. Ivan Stepanovich Khokhlov; Col. Ivan Vasilevich Mulov; Col. Andrei Nikolaievich Volkov; Col. Fyodor Stepanovich Afanasev

The 413th Rifle Division was formed as an infantry division of the Red Army in the summer of 1941 in the Far Eastern Front. It was considered to be a "sister" division to the 415th, and was one of the divisions of Siberians sent west to help defend Moscow during the winter of 1941–42. It was assigned to the 50th Army and originally saw action in the defense of the city of Tula before going over to the counteroffensive in December, suffering massive casualties in the process. It spent much of the next year along the lines it gained over the winter, southwest of the capital, before beginning to push westward as part of Western Front's 1943 summer offensive. During the winter of 1943-44 it was in Belorussian Front (later 1st Belorussian Front) gradually gaining ground towards the Dniepr River to the east of Rogachev. At the start of Operation Bagration the 413th was in the 3rd Army but was soon reassigned to the 65th Army where it remained for most of the rest of the war. The division was awarded a battle honor for its role in the liberation of Brest in July and in 1945 received both the Order of the Red Banner and the Order of Suvorov as it advanced into Poland and Germany with 2nd Belorussian Front. The 413th had a distinguished career as a combat unit, ending its combat path north of Berlin. It was disbanded in the summer of 1946.

== Formation ==
The 413th Rifle Division began forming on August 6, 1941, entirely from assets in the Far Eastern Front. Soldiers and officers came from the South Kazakhstan and Blagoveshchensk Infantry Schools, the Khabarovsk Infantry and Military-Political Schools, and the Vladivostok Artillery Academy. Command cadre came from the staffs of the 1st and 2nd Red Banner Armies, and included many veterans of the Lake Khasan and Khalkhin-Gol fighting. Its order of battle, based on the first wartime shtat (table of organization and equipment) for rifle divisions, was as follows:

- 1320th Rifle Regiment
- 1322nd Rifle Regiment
- 1324th Rifle Regiment
- 982nd Artillery Regiment
- 291st Antitank Battalion (from January 19, 1942)
- 519th Mortar Battalion (until October 10, 1942)
- 207th Reconnaissance Company
- 425th Sapper Battalion
- 487th Signal Battalion (later 487th Signal Company)
- 350th Medical/Sanitation Battalion
- 347th Chemical Protection (Anti-gas) Company
- 212th Motor Transport Company (later 486th Motor Transport Battalion)
- 524th Field Bakery
- 159th Divisional Veterinary Hospital
- 960th Field Postal Station
- 270th Field Office of the State Bank

At the time of its formation its personnel were noted as being mostly Siberian and Kazakh. Maj. Gen. Alexei Dmitrievich Tereshkov was appointed to command on the day the division began forming. The division was considered to be ready for combat by October 1, and over the course of the month was railed westward to join Western Front on October 31, and was then assigned to 50th Army, near Tula, on November 5. It was one of six divisions transferred from Far Eastern Front to the fighting front from September to November. Contrary to the German understanding at the time, there were no wholesale transfers from the far east to the Moscow front.

== Battle of Moscow ==
The 413th first went into action less than a week after joining its Army, which was in Bryansk Front. At this time it had a personnel strength of about 12,000 troops and about 100 artillery pieces and mortars of all types, making it quite a strong front-line division for that period. In the Army's plan for the defense of Tula the division was to launch a counterblow as soon as it de-trained against the forces of the German 2nd Panzer Army from the Volokhov area in the direction of Novyi Tulskii, from five to 15 km southeast of the city. Subsequent operations were to continue the advance towards Shchyokino to link up with 3rd Army. Upon arrival the division consolidated with two rifle regiments along the line from Nizhnie Prisady to Dubovka and the third in Dedilovo, where the 299th Rifle Division was also concentrating.

The counterattack began at dawn on November 7 but developed slowly due to active German resistance and inexperience on the Soviet side. The 32nd Tank Brigade was intended to coordinate with the 413th but was late in reaching its start line and communications between the two units and higher headquarters worked poorly. By the evening the division had reached a line from Malaya Yelovaya to Tikhvinskoe by was attacked there at 2200 hours by two battalions of infantry and 25-30 tanks and was forced to fall back towards Sergievka. (The division did not receive its 291st Antitank Battalion until January 19, 1942.) Following the failure of the Soviet attack the German forces renewed their efforts to force their way into Tula from the south, which were unsuccessful. On November 10 the 50th Army was re-subordinated to Western Front.

In its first week of fighting the division's infantry strength had been reduced to just 800 men. On November 18 the 17th Panzer and 112th Infantry Divisions drove the 413th and 299th Divisions out of Dedilovo before developing their attack to the east in the direction of Stalinogorsk in an effort to outflank the city. During November 20 the division, along with the 32nd Tanks, fought stubborn defensive battles and by the end of the day no longer held a continuous front, with one regiment holding Bolokhovka, a second in the area of Gorki and Dubravo, and the third in the area of Kurakino, overall facing up to an infantry division and 40-50 tanks attempting to outflank Bolokhovka from the north and south. As a result of this fighting the division, along with the 299th and 239th Rifle Divisions, and supporting armor, regrouped 6–8 km north over the night, taking up a line chiefly along the north bank of the Shat River, with the 413th on the line from Marino to Verkhnee Petrovo. On November 24 the 17th Panzer made unsuccessful attempts to cross the river while its main forces advanced towards Kashira.

During the first days of December the 3rd and 4th Panzer Divisions attacked towards Rudnevo, 20 km northeast of Tula, attempting to reach the northern and eastern outskirts of the city. The commander of 50th Army, Lt. Gen. I. V. Boldin, was ordered to destroy this force, starting on December 3. The division was at this point defending the city's eastern sector and during the day it occupied Kolodeznaya with one regiment and by 1400 hours was fighting for Dorofeevka, helping to secure the right flank of the 217th Rifle Division's 740th Rifle Regiment. As of December 7, with the vastly-overextended German offensive coming to a halt and with the Red Army about to shift to the counteroffensive, the 413th was securely holding a line from Height 217.2 to Kryukovo to Tulitsa.

=== Winter Counteroffensive ===
The initial objective of 50th Army was to encircle and destroy the 2nd Panzer Army in conjunction with the 1st Guards Cavalry Corps and the new 10th Army moving westward from the Ryazan area. Its offensive began on December 8 and the 413th, along with the 340th Rifle Division, was again ordered to advance on Shchyokino as well as Dedilovo with the aim of cutting off the retreat route of the Germans' Venev-Dedilovo-Stalinogorsk grouping. The division was supported by the 156th NKVD Regiment and part of the 112th Tank Division, which was under direct command of the 340th, and faced elements of the 296th Infantry Division. By the end of December 10 it had advanced up to 7 km against stubborn resistance. On the following day new orders directed the 413th to take the village of Bolokhovka prior to reaching positions 2 km west of Dedilovo. On December 14 the division secured the villages of Podosinki, Zamyatino and Krutoe (all 5 km southwest Bolokhovka) with its hardest fighting along the Shat River from Prisady station to the east. After December 15 the main forces of the Army began turning to the northwest and by the 18th began advancing towards Kaluga.

By December 20 the 413th had reached a line from Sizenevo to Nikolskie Vyselki and was echeloned to the rear and left of the 50th Army's front with the 217th Rifle Division. On the next day, as the Army's forward detachments began to liberate Kaluga, the division was fighting for Odoevo with one regiment while its main forces were developing the offensive in the direction of Okorokovo. Odoevo was occupied by remnants of the 112th and 167th Infantry Divisions and was cleared by the end of December 22, which allowed the 1st Guards Cavalry to advance to the Oka River south of Likhvin. Over the next three days the division attacked in the direction of Cherepet and Likhvin meeting little resistance. General Boldin ordered General Tereshkov to avoid head-on attacks and encircle the latter town with two regiments while the third moved towards Gordikovo. After stubborn street fighting German resistance in Likhvin collapsed and it was cleared on December 26, following which the 413th continued to develop the offensive to the northwest; Boldin's intention was a deep envelopment of Kaluga from the southwest and west by his left flank divisions.

Kaluga was finally cleared by 1000 hours on December 30 and the surviving German forces fell back to the northwest and west after suffering 7,000 casualties. On the same day the division reached a line from Kromeno to Rassudovo, preventing the retreating forces from moving to the southwest. Following this victory Boldin ordered the bulk of his forces to pursue in the direction of Yukhnov with the 413th and 217th Divisions specifically sent towards Uteshevo. During January 6, 1942 the 50th Army began to run up against more powerful German defenses and the division, having taken Zheleztsovo, continued attacking toward Osenevo and Nedetovo but was being pressed from the north where the 137th and 52nd Infantry Divisions were operating. After this date the Army's forces was involved in increasingly stubborn battles along the approaches to Yukhnov.

By January 14 was regrouping his worn forces as he strained to reach Yukhnov as quickly as possible. The 413th had its front facing west and was fighting in the same area against a German group trying to break through to Uteshevo. The group was forced to fall back with the assistance of the 7th Guards Cavalry Division. By the end of January 18 the division was still slowly forcing the German grouping back along the line from Vshivka to Troskino, after with it was moved to the Army's left flank with the 290th Rifle and 7th Guards Cavalry Divisions which attacked together in the direction of Trufanovo from January 22 in order to bypass Yukhnov from the southwest. Meanwhile, German strength continued to build. An order of January 27 tasked the 413th with blocking two German strongpoints with part of its forces while advancing with its main forces to the area of Marino - Voitovo - Krutoe, due west of Yukhnov. The struggle for this city would continue through February, and it would not be finally liberated until March 5.

== Into Western Russia and Belarus ==
Once Yukhnov was taken 50th Army ground to a halt, and remained roughly on a line from that town to Mosalsk until March, 1943, playing a limited role in the follow-up to the German 9th Army's evacuation from the Rzhev salient, ending up facing its defenses north of Spas-Demensk. In January Col. Ivan Sidorovich Lazarenko had been appointed the 413th's deputy commander, a post he would hold until November 16, when he took command of the 369th Rifle Division. Lazarenko went on to be promoted to major general but was killed in action near Chausy in late June, 1944, posthumously being named a Hero of the Soviet Union in July. On May 24 Col. Ivan Stepanovich Khokhlov took over the 413th from General Tereshkov; Khokhlov would be promoted to the rank of major general on October 16. In the same month it was assigned to the 38th Rifle Corps. During Operation Kutuzov, 50th Army took a secondary role, acting as a flank guard for 11th Guards Army, but still made substantial gains during July. From July 18–21 the 1322nd Regiment was fighting for several villages, including Paliki. Starshina (sergeant-major) Stepan Ignatievich Khirkov was a deputy platoon commander and the political organizer for a company of the regiment. He had already been acclaimed within Western Front for his political work and had received the Order of the Patriotic War, 2nd degree, from General Boldin in person. Khirkov helped to lead the defense of his company's positions, personally destroying two German tanks, and led a counterattack on July 21 which finally drove the German forces back, but suffered fatal wounds and died the same day. On June 3, 1944 he was posthumously made a Hero of the Soviet Union.

In August, in preparation for the summer offensive towards Smolensk, 50th Army was transferred to Bryansk Front and the 413th went back to being a separate rifle division, but was then assigned to 46th Rifle Corps in September; it would be in that Corps for most of the rest of the war. When Bryansk Front was disbanded on October 10, 50th Army joined Central Front, which was soon renamed Belorussian Front.

=== Novyi Bykhov-Propoisk Offensive ===
By the third week of November the left (south) flank of 50th Army had reached the confluence of the Sozh and Pronya Rivers east of the town of Propoisk, which is on the west bank of the Sozh. The Front commander, Army Gen. K. K. Rokossovsky, ordered his 3rd and 50th Armies to attack across the Sozh, with the 3rd beginning on November 22 and the 50th two days later in a supporting role. At this time the 413th was again a separate division in the Army, which was facing the German 9th Army's XXXXI Panzer Corps. The division, with the 110th Rifle Division, attacked in the Uzgorsk and Krasnaia Sloboda sector just north of Propoisk after a ten-minute artillery raid with the 108th Rifle Division in second echelon. These forces were able to cross the river and penetrate the German defense despite rasputitsa conditions and an almost complete absence of roads; in fact, the attack developed quite slowly until 10th Army to the north entered the offensive on November 28 and the commander of 9th Army, Gen. Walter Model, convinced Hitler to allow him to withdraw to new defenses closer to the Dniepr. By November 30 the Army had advanced from 16 to 30 km on a 37 km front, with the 413th still in the first echelon.

=== Bykhov-Chausy Offensive ===
General Rokossovsky planned an offensive to begin in the first days of January, 1944 in the direction of Bykhov to be mounted by his 3rd and 50th Armies. By this time the 3rd Army had reached the Dniepr and a large grouping of German forces were partially encircled east of the river around Bykhov, presenting an inviting target. The 413th, again with the 108th and 110th Divisions, supported by the 233rd Tank Regiment, attacked the positions of the 95th Infantry Division early on January 4 across the Ukhliast River on the 7 km-wide sector between Smolitsa and Krasnitsa with the initial objective of taking the German strongpoint in the latter village. The first day's attack took one German position but was stopped short of Krasnitsa. On January 6 the 324th Rifle Division arrived to reinforce the assault, but the defenders were also reinforced by a battalion-sized battlegroup from the 18th Panzer Grenadier Division which helped to bring the attack to a standstill. Late on January 8 Rokossovsky ordered the offensive halted.

=== Rogachev-Zhlobin Offensive ===
Later in January the division was put under command of the 121st Rifle Corps, still in 50th Army. On the morning of February 22 the left wing of the Army (110th, 108th, 324th and 413th Divisions) went over to an offensive along the Mshatoe Swamp to Adamenka line. On February 24 the 121st Corps assaulted across the Dniepr west of Selets-Kholopeev. The arrival of a battlegroup from 20th Panzer Division stabilized the situation but did not eliminate the bridgehead. Shortly after the end of the operation on February 26 the division was moved back to 46th Corps, 50th Army in the renamed 1st Belorussian Front.

Rokossovsky's next target was the German bridgehead east of the Dniepr centered on Mogilev. He prepared an operation in late March which was to finally liberate both Bykhov and Chausy on the south side of the bridgehead with his 10th and 50th Armies backed by the 1st Guards Tank Corps. General Boldin formed a shock group consisting of the 121st Corps plus the 108th and 413th Divisions of 46th Corps in the 10-km wide sector from Vetrenka to Krasnitsa. The group was supported by the tanks of 233rd Tank Regiment and the SU-76s of 8th SU Brigade, and faced about half each of 18th Panzer Grenadier and 31st Infantry Divisions. The assault began at dawn on March 25 but made little headway over the next six days, gaining between 1 – 3 km and capturing the southern outskirts of Krasnitsa but unable to do more before the offensive was shut down on March 31.

== Operation Bagration ==
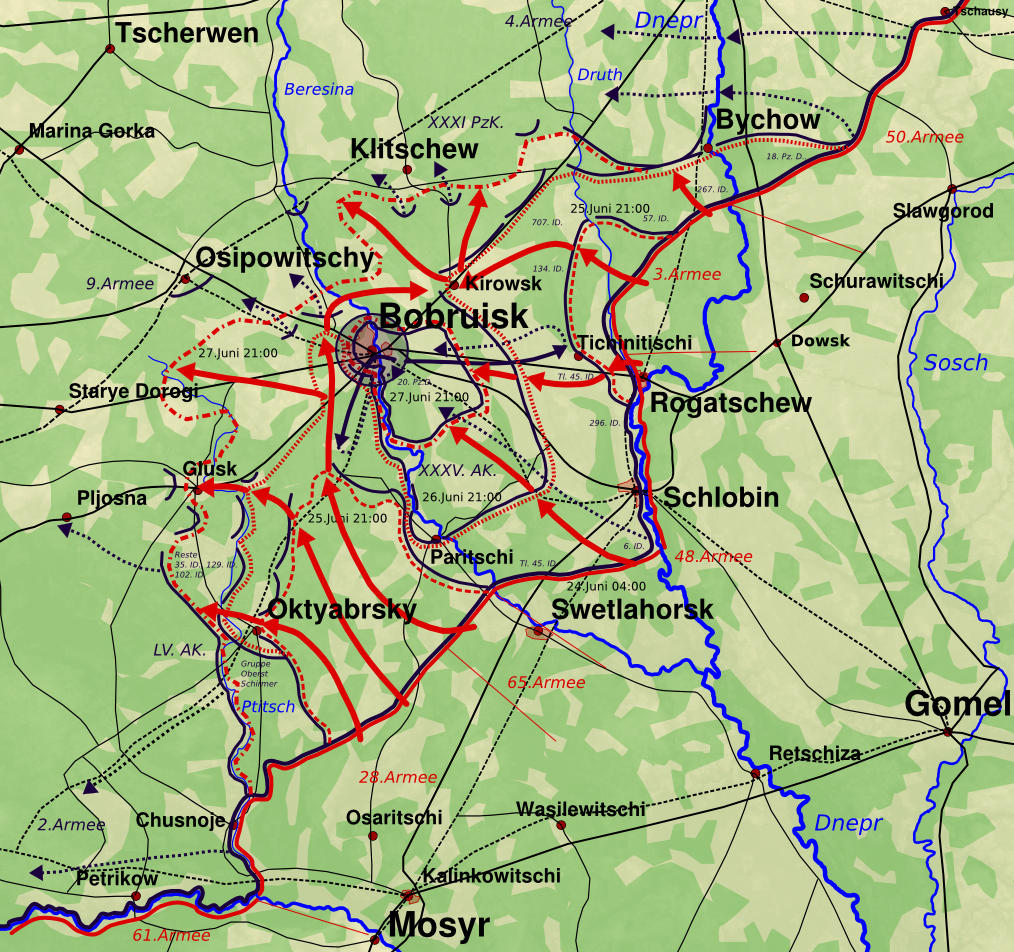
Development of the Bobruysk Operation. 3rd Army began well west of the Dniepr and advanced on Bobryusk from the northeast.

The fighting in Belorussia went into a relative lull through April, May and early June. In April the 413th finally left 50th Army as it and 46th Corps was reassigned to 3rd Army while the 50th was moved to the new 2nd Belorussian Front. On June 1 General Khokhlov handed his command over to Col. Ivan Vasilevich Mulov.

At the start of the summer offensive 46th Corps had just two divisions (72nd and 413th) and was held in reserve to exploit the breakthrough of German 4th Army's lines by the 35th and 41st Rifle Corps, which were tightly packed on a 10 km front facing the northern flank of the 134th Infantry Division. At 0400 hours on June 24, the second day of the main offensive, the German front was hit by a two-hour artillery barrage by 3rd and 48th Armies, followed by the attack of 11 rifle divisions in the first echelon against less than three German infantry divisions. The 134th managed to halt 3rd Army's forces by 0800 hours but later that day the divisions to its north and south gave way which allowed the 9th Tank Corps to exploit into the German rear, gaining 10 km. The next day 46th Corps was committed into the battle in the direction of Ozerane and Pennoe, reaching the outskirts of Pennoe by the end of the day. The commitment of these two corps completed the breakthrough of 4th Army's defenses during June 26, and 3rd Army was now moving decisively towards Bobryusk and the north. By nightfall on June 27 the German forces in the city had been surrounded. The task of taking and clearing the city over the next few days fell to 48th Army while 3rd Army pressed on to the north and west with Osipovichi as its objective.

When the Front began its Baranovichi-Slonim offensive on July 5 the 46th Corps was in Rokossovsky's reserve along with the 80th Rifle and 1st Guards Tank Corps behind the Front's right wing. Baranovichi was taken by 0400 hours on July 8 by forces of 65th Army. At the start of the Brest-Siedlce operation on July 17 the 46th Corps remained in second echelon, along with 1st Guards Tank Corps and the 1st Polish Army.

Near the end of this offensive the 413th took part in the liberation of the city of Brest, on the pre-war border with Poland, on July 28, and received the name of that place as an honorific:

"BREST... 413th Rifle Division (Col. Mulov, Ivan Vasilevich)... The troops who participated in the liberation of Brest, by the order of the Supreme High Command of 28 July 1944, and a commendation in Moscow, are given a salute of 20 artillery salvoes from 224 guns."

At this time the division was in the 114th Rifle Corps of 70th Army. By August 1 it had returned to the 46th Corps which had been transferred to 65th Army, still in 1st Belorussian Front. A month later it was back in 114th Corps of 70th Army, but in October it returned to 46th Corps in 65th Army, where it would remain for the duration of the war. On September 25 Colonel Mulov was replaced in command by Col. Andrei Nikolaievich Volkov.

== Into Poland and Germany ==
On November 19 Marshal Rokossovsky officially assumed command of 2nd Belorussian Front and as part of the handover the 65th Army, which had fought under his command since Stalingrad, was reassigned to that Front, where it would remain for the duration. In the plan for the Viatula-Oder Offensive in January, 1945 the Army was deployed along the line from Borsuki to Ceppelin and was to attack with its left wing on a 7 km front in the direction of Jackowo, Sochocin and Drobin. On January 14 the Army broke through the German defense along a 12 – 13 km front and advanced in fighting from 3 to 5 km. A further advance of 3 to 4 km was made the next day following a 12-minute onslaught by all its artillery. The attack continued overnight, and during January 16 the Army gained up to 20 km, captured the German strongpoint at Nasielsk and cut the railroad from Ciechanów to Modlin. On the 18th the Mława fortified area was secured by combined forces of 5th Guards Tank, 48th and 65th Armies. On February 19 the division was recognized for its part in the battles for Mława, Działdowo and Płońsk in this early stage of the offensive with the award of the Order of the Red Banner.

By the end of January 26 the 65th Army had reached the approaches to Marienwerder and Graudenz and the east bank of the Vistula River southwest of Graudenz. The East Pomeranian Offensive began on February 10, and in a final change of command Colonel Volkov was replaced on February 20 by Col. Fyodor Sepanovich Afanasev. As of February 24 the 65th Army was fighting along a line roughly from Skurz to Wda to Osowo to Schwartzwasser. By March 5 elements of the Front had reached the Baltic Sea north and northwest of Köslin, cutting off the German forces in the Danzig area from Germany; however 65th Army had only managed to advance 8 – 10 km during this period. From March 14–30 the 8th Mechanized Corps worked with 46th Corps in the final reduction of the German Danzig-Gdynia grouping.

On March 24 two men of the 413th were named as Heroes of the Soviet Union, one posthumously. Jr. Sgt. Stepan Vasilievich Averyanov of the 1320th Regiment and the late Sr. Lt. Nikolai Ivanovich Klimenko of the 1324th Regiment had both commanded machine-gun detachments during the attempts of the German forces to break out of the Bobryusk encirclement on June 28–29, 1944. Klimenko had died of wounds on June 30.

=== Berlin Strategic Offensive ===
For the offensive into central Germany the 65th was one of four combined-arms armies deployed by 2nd Belorussian Front along the northern reaches of the Oder River. The Army deployed along the 17 km front from Altdamm to Ferdinandstein, and was to launch its main attack with its left wing, forcing the West Oder and breaking through along a 4 km sector from Kurow to Kolbitzow. The 413th was one of the Army's seven divisions grouped along the axis of the main attack. 46th Corps had a two-echelon formation, with the division in second echelon. The strength of the Army's rifle divisions varied from 3,600 to 4,800 men at this time. 65th Army began forcing the West Oder at 0715 hours on April 20 simultaneously with the start of a 45-minute artillery preparation. 46th Corps' forward detachments managed to seize a bridgehead in the Niederzaden area. On April 21 the division and its corps-mate, the 108th, crossed the river along the line from Frauenhof to Retzowsfelde from 0700 to 2100 hours covered by an extensive smokescreen. German artillery fired up to 1,000 shells and mortar rounds against the smoked area but failed to damage a single crossing.

After beating off counterattacks by Waffen SS troops of the 3rd Panzer Army reserve over the previous day, 46th Corps began to expand its bridgehead on April 22 and by the end of the day had reached a line from Hohen Zaden to the eastern outskirts of Kolbitzow. As German resistance weakened, by the end of the 24th the Corps had reached a line from the outskirts of Pritzlow to Schmellentin to Height 76.2. The next day it got as far as Barnimslow with its front facing northwards towards the Baltic coast. Finally on April 26 the 105th Rifle Corps took Stettin by storm while the 46th and 18th Rifle Corps attacked to the northwest and forced the Randow River and broke through the second German defensive zone. During the fighting the latter two corps repulsed four German counterattacks carried out by the 50th SS Police Brigade, remnants of the 610th Special Purposes Division and the 1st Naval Infantry Division. By the end of the day after an advance of 10–12 km they reached a line from Saltsow to Wollschow to Battin. On the same day each of the four regiments of the 413th were awarded the Order of Suvorov, 3rd Degree, in recognition of their roles in earlier fighting for Gnev and Starogard.

== Postwar ==
When the shooting stopped, the division was on the Baltic coast hear the mouth of the Elbe. On June 4 the division was further distinguished with the Order of Suvorov, 2nd Degree, for its part in the capture of the towns of Eggesin, Torgelow and Templin, west of the Oder in the Berlin campaign. As a result, the final honorific title of its men and women was 413th Rifle, Brest, Order of the Red Banner, Order of Suvorov Division. (Russian: 413-я стрелковая Брестская Краснознамённая ордена Суворова дивизия).

The division was reassigned to the Northern Group of Forces in Poland shortly after the German surrender. In August, 1945 it was moved to Belgorod in the Voronezh Military District. The division was briefly transferred to the 96th Rifle Corps before being disbanded by the summer of 1946.
