= Alexey Tereshkov =

Soviet lieutenant general (1893–1960)

Lieutenant General Alexey Tereshkov
- Native name: Аляксей Дзмітрыевіч Церашкоў
- Born: 17 March 1893; Karma, Gomelsky Uyezd, Mogilev Governorate, Russian Empire
- Died: 18 March 1960 (aged 67) Gorky, Soviet Union
- Allegiance: Russian Empire; Soviet Union
- Branch: Imperial Russian Army; Red Army/Soviet Army
- Service years: 1913–1953
- Rank: Lieutenant General
- Commands: 413th Rifle Division; 38th Rifle Corps; 113th Rifle Corps; 5th Guards Rifle Corps
- Conflicts: World War I; Battle of Galicia; Russian Civil War; Spanish Civil War; World War II; Battle of Moscow; Battle of Smolensk; Operation Bagration; Vistula-Oder Offensive; Battle of Berlin
- Awards: Hero of the Soviet Union; Order of Lenin (2); Order of the Red Banner (4); Order of Suvorov, 2nd class; Order of Kutuzov, 2nd class; Cross of St. George 2nd, 3rd and 4th class; Medal of St. George (3)

Alexey Dmitrievich Tereshkov (Russian: Алексей Дмитриевич Терешков; Belarusian: Аляксей Дзмітрыевіч Церашкоў; 17 March 1893–18 March 1960) was a Belarusian Soviet Army Lieutenant general and a Hero of the Soviet Union. Tereshkov fought in World War I as a non-commissioned officer and then as a platoon leader. After the February Revolution he joined the Bolshevik party and became a partisan fighting against German troops in Belarus. Tereshkov became a Red Army officer and fought in the Russian Civil War as a company commander. He fought in the Spanish Civil War and after Operation Barbarossa, was commander of the 413th Rifle Division in the Far East. The division fought in the Battle of Moscow. In May 1943, Tereshkov was appointed Commander of the 38th Rifle Corps, leading the corps during the Battle of Smolensk, Operation Bagration, Vistula–Oder Offensive, and the Battle of Berlin. He was awarded the title "Hero of the Soviet Union" for his leadership in the Vistula–Oder Offensive. Postwar, Tereshkov led the 113th and 5th Guards Rifle Corps. He retired in 1953 and died in 1960.

== Early life and career ==
Tereshkov was born on 17 March 1893 in the village of Karma in Mogilev Governorate. From the time he was a child, Tereshkov helped his father in carpentry, then became a bricklayer. Tereshkov built houses in Shuya, Moscow and Kiev. In 1913, he was drafted into the Imperial Russian Army. After the beginning of World War I, he was sent to the front. In the fall of 1914, Tereshkov was wounded in the leg near Lemberg. After his recovery, Tereshkov graduated from short courses and became a senior non-commissioned officer. He was again sent to the front. For his actions, he was awarded three Crosses of St. George and three Medals of St. George. Tereshkov became a platoon leader at the front. He joined the Bolsheviks immediately after the February Revolution. Tereshkov deserted from the army and returned to Karma.

Tereshkov created a Bolshevik cell in Karma. During the Russian Civil War, he led a partisan unit against German troops and was later a company commander in the Bohun Regiment led by Nikolay Shchors.

== Interwar ==
After the end of the Civil War, Tereshkov was a battalion commander and a regimental commander. In 1922, he graduated from the Vystrel course. Between 1937 and 1938, Tereshkov fought in the Spanish Civil War with the rank of major. For his actions he was awarded the Order of the Red Banner on 22 February 1939. Tereshkov was promoted to Major general on 4 June 1940. In 1941, he graduated from the Frunze Military Academy Commanders Refresher Courses.

== World War II ==
After the beginning of Operation Barbarossa, Tereshkov was appointed commander of the newly formed 413th Rifle Division in the Far East. In the fall of 1941 it was transferred to the 50th Army and fought in the defense of Tula. On 31 October the division's troops entered combat after disembarking from trains. The division was ordered to take up defenses on the line of Nizhnye Prisady, Sergeyevsky, and Trushkino. The division took the brunt of the advance of the 2nd Panzer Group towards Dedilovo. From 9 November to 5 December the division repulsed German attacks. The 413th Division withdrew to the north bank of Shat River defending Marvino and Petrovo. The division participated in the army's counterattack, which stopped the German attack. In late November, the division defended Venyov, and Tereshkov became commander of the Venyov Combat Area. Two other battle-weakened divisions were assigned to the command along with separate units. For five days the troops were able to stop the German advance south of Venyov. On 24 November, Venyov was captured. During the defensive battles, the division reportedly destroyed more than 100 German tanks. In December, the division launched an attack towards Shchyokino and Zhidkov, soon capturing Shchyokino. Elements of the division captured Vorotynsk station. During 1942, the division fought in a number of offensive and defensive operations. On 2 January 1942 Tereshkov was awarded a second Order of the Red Banner.

On 23 May 1943, Tereshkov was appointed commander of the 38th Rifle Corps. As part of the 50th Army, 49th Army and 33rd Army, the corps fought in the Smolensk Operation, the Bryansk Offensive, and the Gomel-Rechitsa Offensive. On 28 September 1943 Tereshkov was awarded the Order of Suvorov 2nd class. The corps fought in Operation Bagration. The corps helped encircle German troops around Mogilev. During the Minsk Offensive the corps rapidly advanced and captured Chavusy and Chervyen’. During the crossing of the Vistula the corps helped hold the Puławy bridgehead. On 3 November Tereshkov was awarded a third Order of the Red Banner. In January 1945, the corps fought in the Vistula–Oder Offensive. The corps broke through German defenses on the bridgehead and started to pursue retreating German troops. The corps crossed the Warta and fifteen days later, having advanced 400 kilometers, the corps crossed the Oder and captured a bridgehead in the Fürstenberg area. On 21 February, Tereshkov received the Order of Lenin. On 6 April 1945, Tereshkov was awarded the title Hero of the Soviet Union and the Order of Lenin for his leadership during the offensive. The corps then fought in the Berlin Offensive. On 20 April Tereshkov was promoted to lieutenant general. On 29 May he was awarded the Order of Kutuzov 2nd class.

== Postwar ==
Tereshkov became commander of the 113th Rifle Corps in November 1945. On 11 January 1947 he became commander of the 5th Guards Rifle Corps. Both corps were part of the 39th Army, stationed in the Liaodong Peninsula. On 20 June 1949 Tereshkov was awarded a fourth and last Order of the Red Banner. In May 1950 he became deputy commander of the Gorky Military District. Tereshkov retired in 1953 due to his age and lived in Gorky. He died on 18 March 1960 and was buried in the Marina Roshcha cemetery.

== Sources ==
- Feskov, V.I.; Golikov, V.I.; Kalashnikov, K.A.; Slugin, S.A. (2013). Вооруженные силы СССР после Второй Мировой войны: от Красной Армии к Советской [The Armed Forces of the USSR after World War II: From the Red Army to the Soviet: Part 1 Land Forces] (in Russian). Tomsk: Scientific and Technical Literature Publishing. ISBN 9785895035306.
