= 51st Tank Division =

- 51-я танковая дивизия
- Active: March 1941
- Disbanded: July 15, 1941
- Country: Soviet Union
- Branch: Red Army
- Type: Armored

Commanders
- Current commander: Colonel Pyotr Grigoryevich Chernov

The 51st Tank Division was a division of the Soviet Armed Forces during World War II. It was designated as Military Unit Number 4865.

== History of the Division ==
Formed in March 1941 on the basis of the 5th Light Tank Brigade in the Ural Military District.

In the active army from June 1941 to July 1941.

The division's management was stationed in Bryansk by June 22. With the beginning of Operation Barbarossa, the unit was subordinated to the corps of the 24th Army, but as of 01.07.1941 it was re-subordinated to the 19th Army. At the same time, most of the division's units remained in peacetime states, as the division was undersupplied. For this reason, it remained under completion in the area of Rzhev, with the exception of the 102nd Tank Regiment, which was sent to Vitebsk by the command of the 23rd Mechanized Corps, where on July 10, 1941, it participated in several attempts to knock the enemy out the bridgehead in the eastern part of the city together with the 220th Motorized Division. She took part in the preparation of defensive lines (Selizharovo, Olenino, Vasilyevo).

On July 13, 1941, it was renamed the 110th Tank Division and in July 15 it was transferred to the 31st Army.

== Composition ==
- 101st Tank Regiment: Commander Lieutenant Colonel P. A. Yudin
- 102nd Tank Regiment: commander - Major N. And. Smirnov, Chief of Staff - Captain V. F. Svetlov
- 51st Motor Rifle Regiment
- 51st Howitzer Artillery Regiment
- 51st Reconnaissance Battalion
- 51st Independent Anti-aircraft Artillery Division
- 51st Separate Communications Battalion
- 51st Motor Transport Battalion
- 51st Repair and Repair Battalion
- 51st Pontoon and Bridge Battalion
- 51st Medical and Sanitary Battalion
- 51st Regulatory Company
- 51st Field Automobile Bakery
- 758th Field Post Station
- 503rd Field Cash Desk of the State Bank

== Division Command ==
=== Division commander ===
- Chernov, Pyotr Georgievich (11.03.1941 - 15.07.1941), Colonel

=== Deputy commander for the combat unit ===
- Arman, Pol Matisovich (11.03.1941 - 07.1941), Colonel
- from May 9, 1941 - deputy commander of the division Massarygin, Georgy Semyonovich Colonel.

=== Military commissar of the division ===
- Viktor Prokofyevich Shirokov (20.03.1941 - 12.07.1941), regimental commissar

=== Chief of Division Staff ===
- Kopienko Vladimir Emelyanovich (12.03.1941 - 12.07.1941), lieutenant colonel

== Literature ==
- Drig, E. F. (2005). Mechanized corps of the Red Army in battle. History of the armored troops of the Red Army in 1940-1941. Unknown Wars (in Russian). Moscow: AST. ISBN 5-17-024760-5.
- The first officer of the USSR Ministry of Defense. Command of the corps and divisional unit of the Soviet Armed Forces during the Great Patriotic War of 1941-1945 / selection and design. A. And. Kalabin. - Moscow: Military Academy named after M. B. Frunze, 1964. - 572 p. - (annex to the book "Military cadres of the Soviet State in the Great Patriotic War of 1941-1945").
- The leading political composition of the departments of fronts, fleets, armies, flotillas, corps, divisions, units of the Navy and tank brigades of the Great Patriotic War of 1941-1945 / selection and design. A. С. Zherzdev. - Moscow: Publication of the Military Academy named after M. B. Frunze, 1968. - p. 786.
