= Stalin Line =

Soviet fortification system of the interwar period

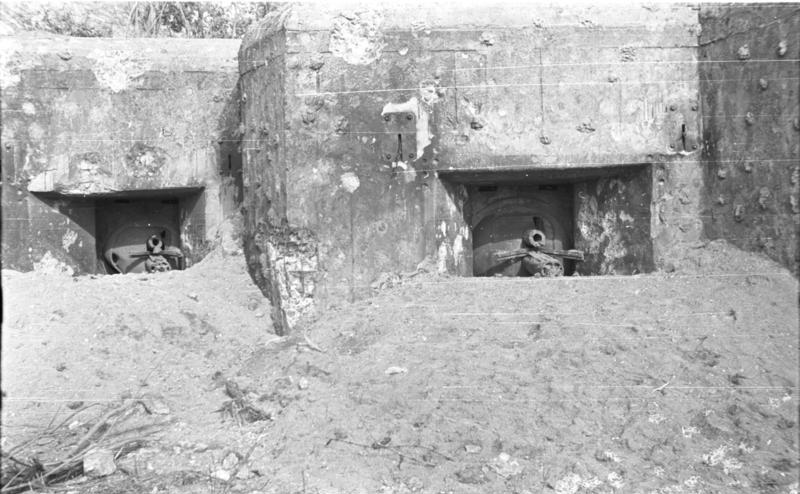
Gun emplacements of a Stalin Line bunker near Mogilev.

The Stalin Line was a line of fortifications along the western border of the Soviet Union (USSR). Work began on the system in the 1920s to protect the USSR against attacks from the west. The line was made up of concrete bunkers and gun emplacements, somewhat similar to, but less elaborate than the Maginot Line. It was not a continuous line of defense along the entire border, but rather a network of fortified districts, meant to channel potential invaders along certain corridors.

== World War II ==
In the aftermath of the Molotov–Ribbentrop Pact, with the westward expansion of the USSR in 1939 and 1940 into Poland, the Baltic, and Bessarabia, the decision was made to abandon the line in favour of constructing the Molotov Line further west, along the new border of the USSR. A number of Soviet generals felt that it would be better to keep both lines and to have a defence in depth, but this conflicted with the pre-World War II Soviet military doctrine.

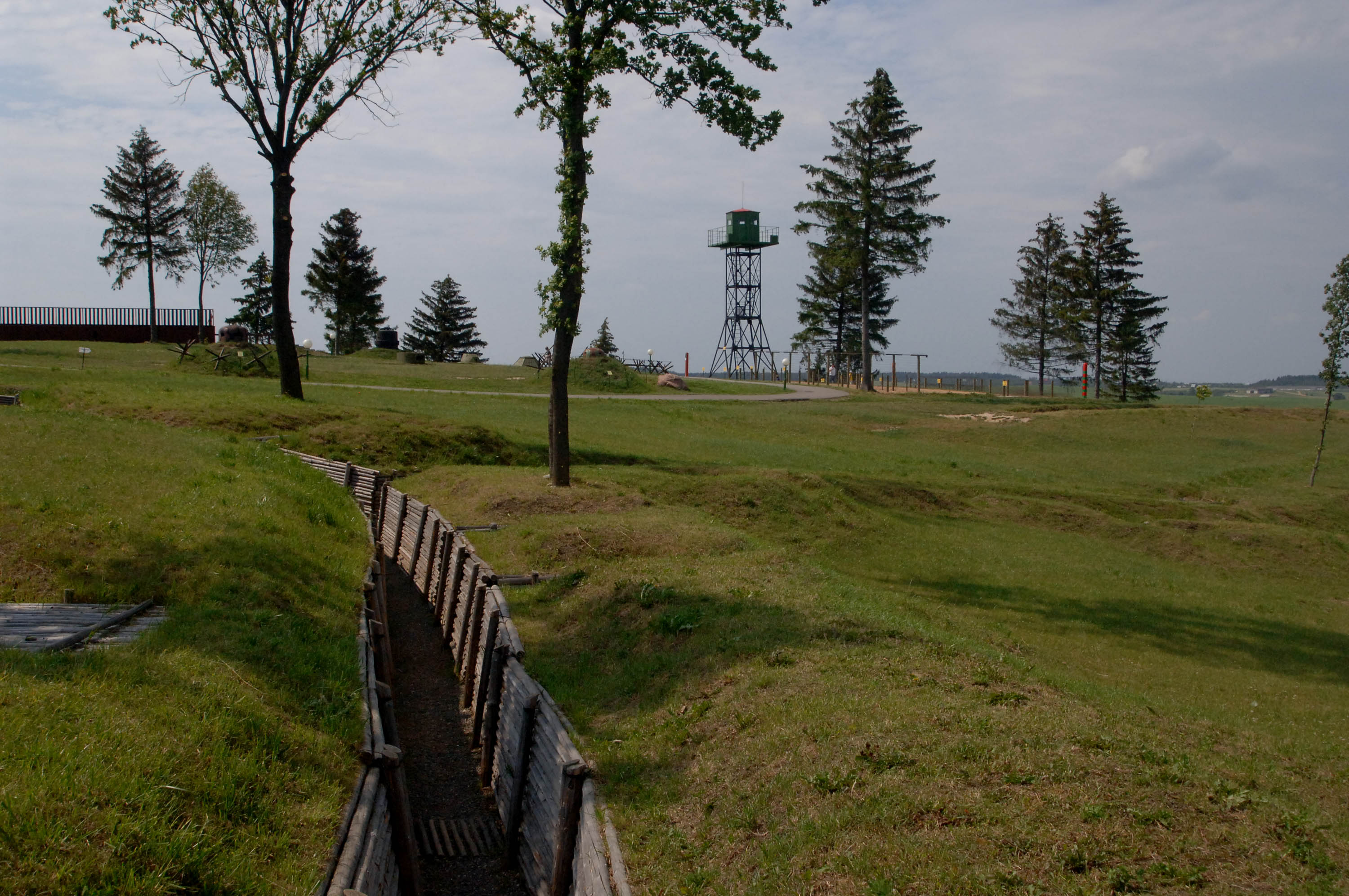
Preserved remains of the Stalin Line near Minsk.

Thus, the guns were removed, but were mostly in storage as the new line began construction. The 1941 Axis invasion caught the Soviets with the new line unfinished and the Stalin Line largely abandoned and in disrepair. Neither line of fortifications was of much use in stopping the onslaught, though parts of the Stalin Line were manned in time and contributed to the defense of the USSR.

== Post-World War II ==
Following World War II the line was not maintained, in part due to its wide dispersal across the USSR. Unlike Western Europe, where similar fortifications were demolished for development and safety reasons, much of the line survived beyond the breakup of the USSR in 1991 due to being ignored. Today, the remains of the Stalin Line fortifications are located in Belarus, Russia, and Ukraine (plus possibly the eastern parts of Moldova).

== See also ==
- KaUR – the fortified region north of St. Petersburg
- Soviet offensive plans controversy – controversial attempt to explain 1940–1941 dismantling of the Stalin Line.
