= 23rd Mechanized Corps =

- Active: 1941
- Country: Soviet Union
- Branch: Red Army
- Type: Mechanized corps
- Engagements: World War II: Battle of Smolensk (1941)

Commanders
- Notable commanders: Mikhail Myasnikov

The 23rd Mechanized Corps (Military Unit Number 9841) was a Mechanized corps of the Red Army. Its divisions fought in the Battle of Smolensk (1941) but the corps itself never fought as a unit. The corps became the second formation of the 23rd Rifle Corps.

== History ==
=== Formation ===
The 23rd Mechanized Corps was formed in March 1941 in the Oryol Military District at Voronezh. The corps included the 48th and 51st Tank Divisions, and the 220th Motorized Division. The 48th was at Voronezh, the 51st at Bryansk, and the 220th at Yelets. The corps was commanded by Major General Mikhail Myasnikov.

=== World War II ===
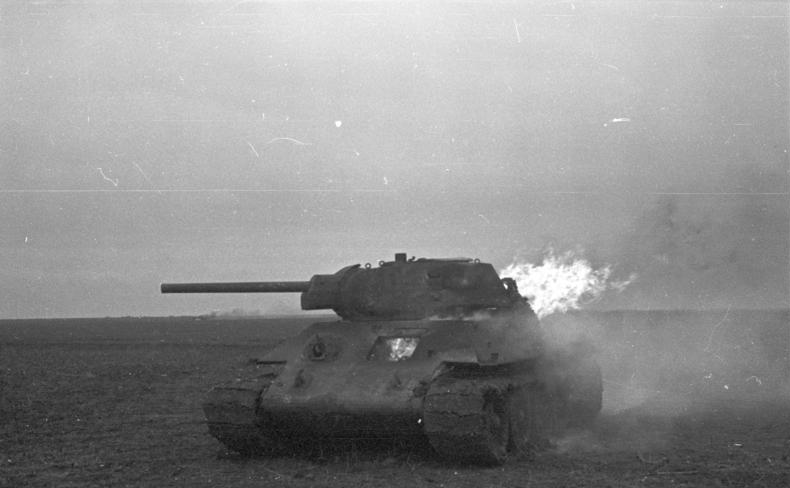
Burning T-34 tank of the type used by the corps

The corps was assigned to support the 24th Army on 27 June, but due to the slow deployment of the 25th Mechanized Corps was reassigned to the 19th Army on 1 July. The corps moved to the Vitebsk and Liozno region. At this time the corps had 413 tanks. These included 21 new KV tanks and T-34 medium tanks. The 51st Tank Division was sent to Rzhev to support the reserve armies. On 9 July the 220th Motorized Division was ordered into action with the 19th Army, without the rest of the 23rd Mechanized Corps, which had not yet arrived in the area. On 10 July, the 51st Tank Division was assigned to the 31st Army. The 57th Tank Division was assigned to the corps to replace the 51st Division but never joined it, instead moving to Orsha in support of the 20th Army. On 11 July, the corps became part of 19th Army reserve in the Mogilno and Berezino region. The 48th Tank Division was sent to the Nevel region and became part of the 22nd Army on 12 July to lead the army's counterattack. As a result of these changes, the corps did not fight as a unit.

The perechen (list of Soviet units during World War II) states that the corps was converted into the 23rd Rifle Corps (Second Formation) on 20 July. Corps deputy commander Yakov Sharaburko became commander of the 23rd Rifle Corps, part of the 24th Army. On 1 August it included the 100th Rifle Division and the 194th Mountain Rifle Division.
