= Karelian Fortified Region =

Soviet border defenses against Finland

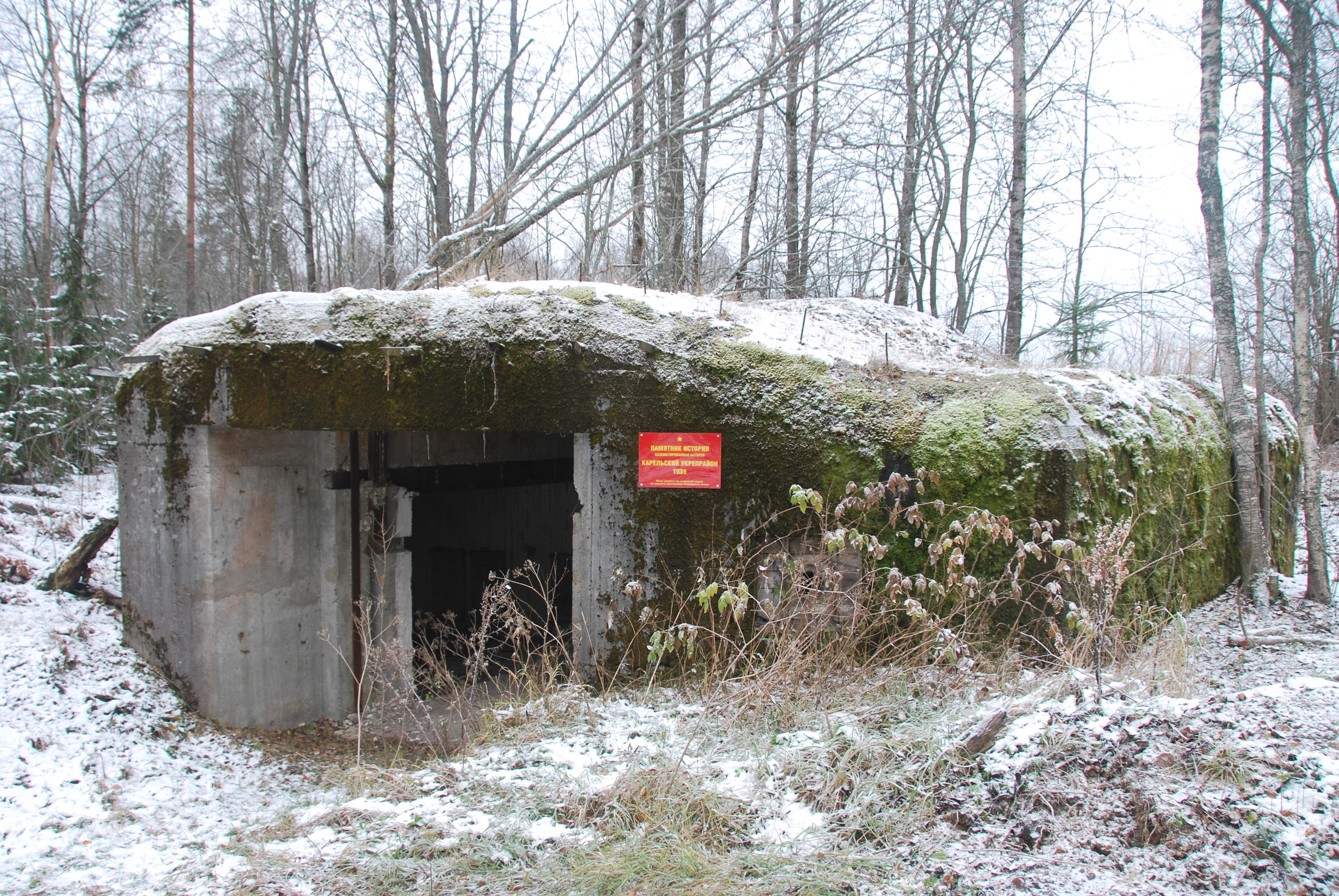
Fortifications in Kalelovo

The 22nd Karelian Fortified Region (KaUR; Russian: Карельский укрепленный район; Карельский укрепрайон; КаУР) is a 60 km wide Soviet defensive fortified district to the north of Leningrad (now Saint Petersburg) that was built in 1928–1932, 1938–1939, 1941–1944 and 1950–1965 in the Soviet part of the Karelian Isthmus amongst other fortified areas (including the Stalin Line) constructed around that time in order to defend the western borders of the Soviet Union. The KaUR spans the old Finno-Russian border from Valkeasaari near the northern shore of the Gulf of Finland through Lempaala to Nizhniye Nikulyasy Bay on the western shore of Lake Ladoga.

The 42nd Rifle Division was formed from individual infantry and construction battalions within the Region on 17 January 1940. Its commander in 1941 was General Major Mikhail Andrianovich Popov.

Among Soviet definitions of Fortified Regions were:

- Fortified Region as a fortified area, equipped in engineering terms for defence, line of defense in the form of long-term centers of resistance strongholds that are in interaction and forming general group (tens of kilometers of engineering structures, different obstacles, managed and unmanaged minefields), with a garrison of Fortified district troops designed to perform defensive tasks.
- Fortified area as a system of permanent fortifications, permanent resistance in these special garrisons and combined arms. Restricting the opponent for all his front, they create the possibility of concentration of large forces and means for applying the enemy crushing blows in other areas. Troops battling in fortified areas require special tenacity, endurance and stamina.

== See also ==
- Mannerheim Line
- Salpa Line
- Molotov Line
- Stalin Line
