= Chavusy district =

District of Mogilev region, Belarus

Chavusy district Чавускі раён (Belarusian)
- District
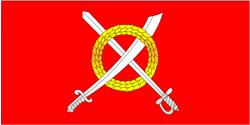
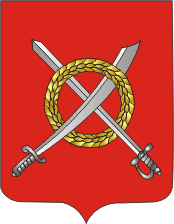
- Flag Coat of arms

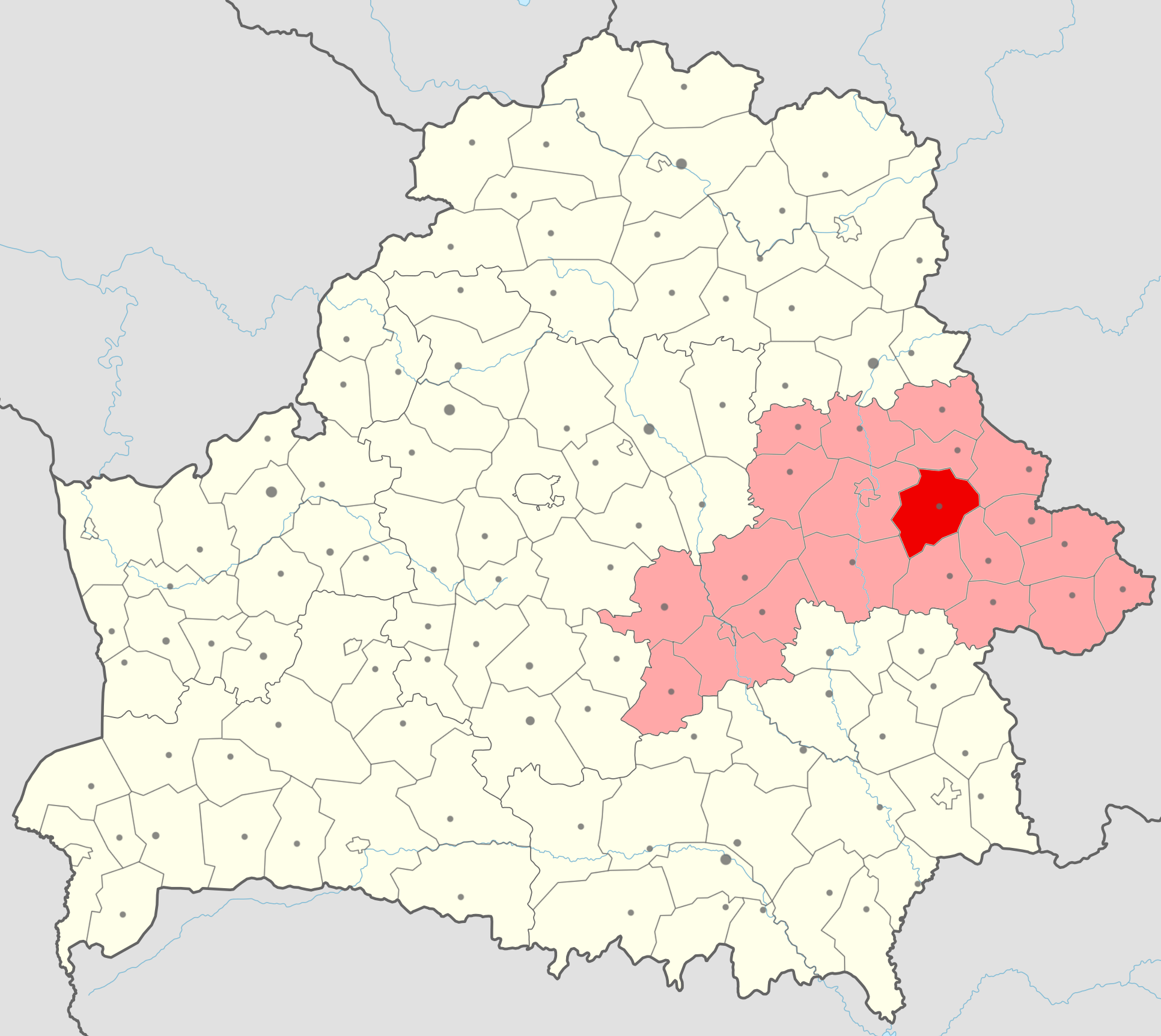
- Coordinates: 53°48′N 30°58′E
- Country: Belarus
- Region: Mogilev region
- Administrative center: Chavusy

Area
  - District: 1,471.39 km^{2} (568.11 sq mi)
- Elevation: 193 m (633 ft)

Population (2024)
  - District: 16,629
  - Density: 11.302/km^{2} (29.271/sq mi)
  - Urban: 9,817
  - Rural: 6,812
- Time zone: UTC+3 (MSK)

Chavusy district or Čavusy district (Belarusian: Чавускі раён; Russian: Чаусский район, romanized: Chaussky rayon) is a district (raion) of Mogilev region in Belarus. The administrative center is the town of Chavusy. As of 2009, its population was 21,242; the population accounted for 50.3% of the district's population. As of 2024, it has a population of 16,629.
