= 42nd Rifle Division =

42nd Motorized Division 42nd Rifle Division
- Active: 17 Jan 1940 – 29 Jun 1945
- Country: Soviet Union
- Branch: Red Army
- Type: Infantry
- Size: Division
- Engagements: Winter War; Brest Fortress; Battle of Smolensk; Battle of Kiev; Smolensk Strategic Offensive; Minsk Offensive; East Prussian Offensive
- Battle honours: Smolensk; Order of the Red Banner; Order of Kutuzov II class Order of Suvorov II class

The 42nd Rifle Division was a unit of the Red Army during the Great Patriotic War. The division, first formed in 1940, was nearly destroyed in the opening days of the Operation Barbarossa defending the Brest Fortress. Disbanded in late December 1941 and immediately reformed in the Volga Military District. The division then served on the front until disbanded at the end of the war.

== History ==
=== 1st Formation ===
The division was formed on 17 January 1940 in the Leningrad Military District from individual infantry and construction battalions in the Karelian Fortified Region. Kombrig Ivan Sidorovich Lazarenko was appointed as commander. In February 1940 it fought in the Winter War as part of the 7th Army's 34th Rifle Corps and on 27 February was assigned to the 10th Rifle Corps.

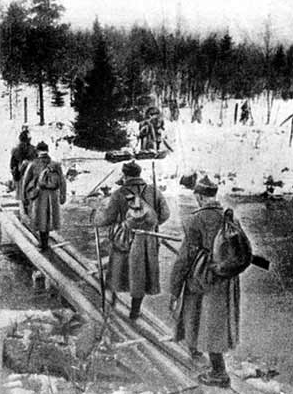
Soviet infantry crossing Rajajoki 1940

In June 1940 the division was sent to Estonia as part of the 8th Army's 19th Rifle Corps, but was reassigned to the Western Special Military District to replace the 33rd Rifle Division. In the spring of 1941 the division was ordered to the area of Brest. As part of the 4th Army's 28th Rifle Corps, the division was tasked to defend the right wing of the Brest Fortified Region from the mouth of the river to Drohiczyn Pulva. By early June 1941 the division was still not fully manned having about 8,000 assigned out of 14,500 authorized.

==== Beginning of the War ====
On 22 June 1941 the units of the division were in several places within the Brest covering region. The 459th Rifle Regiment, 472nd Artillery Regiment, 4th Antitank Battalion, and the 3rd Medical Battalion were in their training area around Zhabinka. The remaining units were based in the Brest Fortress and the immediate surrounding areas. The massive artillery strike by the German 4th Army's 45th Infantry Division at 0400 on 22 June disrupted many of the division's units located inside the fortress. Many units inside the fortress dispersed into scattered groups and the division lost a significant number of personnel and most of its equipment. The 393rd Separate Antiaircraft Artillery Battalion escaped from the fortress with three of its guns, but no ammunition for them. In the Zhabinka training area the division managed to gather together two battalions of the 44th and 455th Rifle Regiments (mostly without weapons), as well as vehicles from the 7th Motorized Infantry Company of the 84th Reconnaissance Battalion. The rest of the division's surviving members were consolidated into a small number of groups, who either took up the Defense of Brest Fortress or joined the 22nd Tank Division on the outskirts of Zhabenko in an attack to relieve the siege of Brest.

The remaining parts of the 42nd Rifle Division, stationed east of Brest attempted a defense in the Kobrin District and the Birch-Kartuzskaya area. During the period 25–27 June the division lost all of its assigned artillery and together with the rest of the Soviet 4th Army attempted a series of delaying actions as they took up positions on the east bank of the Berezina River at Babruysk. The division fought a series of fierce defense battles in the area. By 1 July the occupied positions near Zhuravichi where it received 1,000 replacements. In early July the Western Front ordered to construct a defensive line along the Berezina River to the Dnieper River on the line of: Lyubanichi - Ohotichi - Ozerany - Shapchitsy to a depth of 5 km in order to counter possible enemy actions north of Bobruisk. The division along with local civilian parties built these barriers. Unfortunately these efforts proved worthless as German flank attacks thwarted these plans and the entire 4th Army was surrounded. By 4 July the division was completely unfit for combat, but yet managed to escape from the encirclement and gather in the Gorki-Vydrenka area. At this point the division had about 4,000 members, of which half were reservists who had arrived at the unit just before the war began.

==== Battle of Smolensk ====
After resupply the division, still assigned to the 4th Army's 28th Rifle Corps, took up positions, along with the rest of the Corps, in the second tier of the Soviet Western Front near Propoisk. However, the rapid breakthrough of German Panzer groups across the Dnieper line brought the division again under attack. By 15 July its divisions were pushed back from Propoisk and were surrounded, and the German 4th Panzer Division took the town.

On 29 July, Colonel M.E. Kozyr with a group from the division headquarters and headquarters of the 44th Infantry Regiment, escaped from the encirclement. On 30 July, the 21st Army ordered the 42nd Division resubordinated to the 21st Rifle Corps, and then reassigned to the 67th Rifle Corps.

In early August 1941 the division transferred to the 3rd Army and participated in the battles in the Pripyat Marshes. After leaving the Pripyat Marshes the 42nd Division again became a part of the 67th Corps of the 21st Army, now assigned to the Bryansk Front.

==== Battle of Kiev ====
By 1 September 1941 the 67th Rifle Corps was deployed on the line Obolon - Reymentarovka - Zhadovo - Semenivka front to the east and began an offensive against the units of the 2nd Panzer Group. However, on 2 September the Corps came under the flank attack by the Das Reich Motorized Division and the German 1st Cavalry Division and began to withdraw to their original positions . By the end of 12 September, Soviet forces fought along the on line Grigorovka - Hvastovtsy - Nizhin. By 20 September a large group of Soviet troops, including the 42nd Division, was locked in Kiev cauldron. Likely destroyed by the end of September, the division was disbanded 27 December 1941. The 42nd Rifle Division name was assigned to one of the new units being formed at this time in the Volga Military District.

==== Subordinate Units ====
44th Rifle Regiment
455th Rifle Regiment
459th Rifle Regiment (formerly 459th Light Motorized Rifle Rgt)
472nd Artillery Regiment
17th Howitzer Artillery Regiment
4th Separate Antitank Artillery Battalion
393rd Separate Antiaircraft Artillery Battalion
84th Reconnaissance Company
262nd Sapper Battalion
18th Separate Signal Battalion
3rd Medical Battalion
35th Separate Chemical Defense Company
158th Motor Transport Battalion
9th Field Bakery
188th Field Office of the State Bank

=== 2nd Formation ===
Started forming on 27 December 1941 at Volsk in the Volga Military District. The division remained in the Volga Military District until Mar 42 and was assigned to the STAVKA reserves for another two months before being assigned to the front line. Assigned to the 49th Army in the Western Front. The division had a quiet year with the 49th Army before being reassigned to the 33rd Army in April 43.

As the Soviet summer offensive began the division, along with the 33rd Army, Western Front, and the neighboring fronts advanced west. The division participated in the Battle of Smolensk liberating the city in late September 1943.

In June 1944, now back with the 49th Army the division took part in Operation Bagration and the defeat of Army Group Center. The division fought towards Minsk, and the liberated Grodno. The unit was awarded both the Order of the Red Banner and the Order of Kutuzov II Class for it actions during this operation.

In 1945 the division participated in the East Prussian Strategic Offensive Operation, fighting at Danzig, the East Pomeranian Strategic Offensive Operation, and the Berlin Strategic Offensive Operations. The division ended the war on the Elbe River near Ludwigslust. It was still part of the 49th Army of the 2nd Belorussian Front. Initially, part of the Group of Soviet Occupation Forces in Germany, the division was ordered to disband in June 1945, and completed disbanding on 12 June 1945.

Fought at Lenino, Mogilev.

==== Subordinate Units ====
- 44th Rifle Regiment
- 455th Rifle Regiment
- 459th Rifle Regiment
- 472nd Artillery Regiment
- 4th Antitank Battalion
- 102nd Mortar Battalion (until 14 October 1942)
- 84th Reconnaissance Company
- 262nd Sapper Battalion
- 563rd Separate Signals Battalion (formally 18th Sep. Signals Battalion, 158th Sep. Signals Company)
- 3rd Medical Battalion (formally 607th Medical Battalion)
- 504th Separate Chemical Defense Company
- 166th Auto-Transport Company (formally 158th Auto-Transport Company)
- 420th Field Bakery
- 885th Veterinary Field Hospital
- 1655th Field Postal Station
- 1076th Field Cash Office of the State Bank

== Commanders ==
- Kombrig Ivan Lazarenko - (31 Jan 1940 - 02 Jul 1941) Major General 4 Jun 1940
- Colonel M.D. Grishin - (24 Jul 1941 - 27 Dec 1941)
- Colonel S.L. Sadovskii - (27 Jul 1941 - 14 Jul 1942)
- Colonel N.K. Mul'tan - (15 Jul 1942 - 26 Nov 1943) Major General 14 Feb 1943
- Colonel S.M. Moiseyenkov - (27 Nov 1943 - 1 Jan 1944)
- Colonel S.M. Moiseyenkov (07 Jan 1944 - 23 Jan 1944)
- Colonel A.I. Slits - (24 Jan 1944 - 21 Mar 1944)
- Colonel S.I. Stanovskii - (22 Mar 1944 - 29 Mar 1944)
- Colonel A.I. Slits - (30 Mar 1944 - 30 Oct 1944)
- Colonel N.S. Pachkov - (31 Oct 1944 - 16 Apr 1945)
- Colonel S.K Isakov - (17 Apr 1945 - 27 Apr 1945)
- Colonel G.I. Yemel'Yanenko - (28 Apr 1945 – after 9 May 1945) (probably until unit disbanded)

== Sources ==
- Aliev, Rostislav & Britton, Stuart, The Siege of Brest 1941: A Legend of Red Army Resistance on the Eastern Front, Pen & Sword, October 2013
- Crofoot, Craig, Armies of the Bear, orbat.com, 42nd Rifle Division
- Sharp, Charles C., Soviet Order of Battle World War II, Volume VIII, Red Legions: Soviet Rifle Divisions Formed Before June 1941, George F. Nafziger, 1996
- Sharp, Charles C., Soviet Order of Battle World War II, Volume X, Red Swarm: Soviet Rifle Divisions Formed Frome 1942 to 1945, George F. Nafziger, 1996
