= Chavusy =

Chavusy Чавусы
- Town
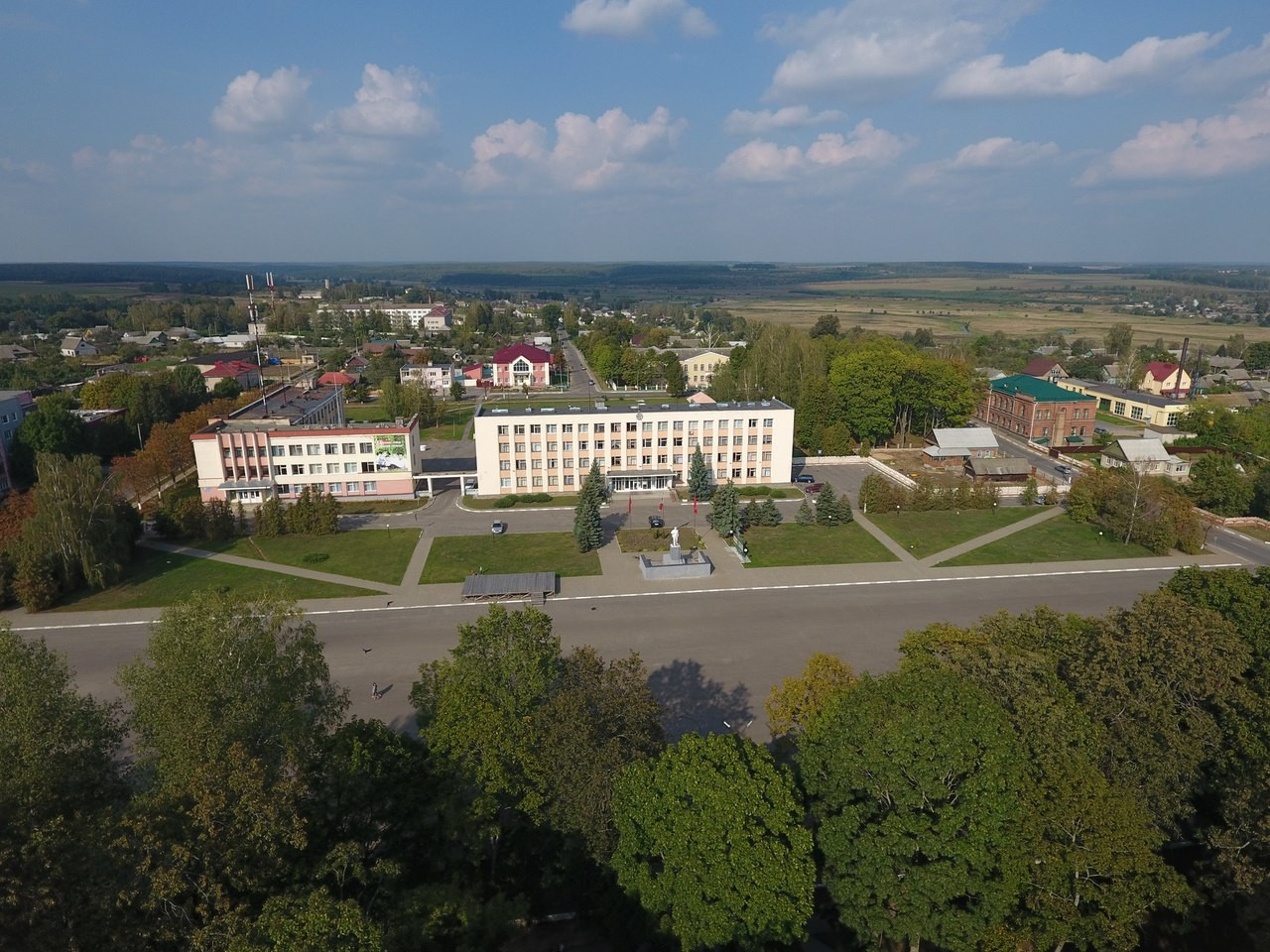

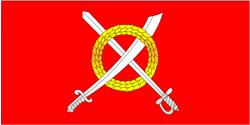
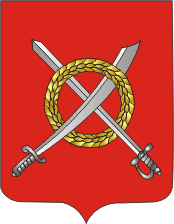
- Flag Coat of arms

- Location within Belarus
- Coordinates: 53°48′27″N 30°58′17″E
- Country: Belarus
- Region: Mogilev Region
- District: Chavusy District

Population (2025)
  - Total: 9,690
- Time zone: UTC+3 (MSK)

Chavusy or Chausy (Note: Belarusian: Чавусы, romanized: Čavusy; Russian: Чаусы; Polish: Czausy; Yiddish: טשאָוס.) is a town in Mogilev Region, in eastern Belarus. It serves as the administrative center of Chavusy District. In 2009, its population was 10,692. As of 2025, it has a population of 9,690.

== History ==
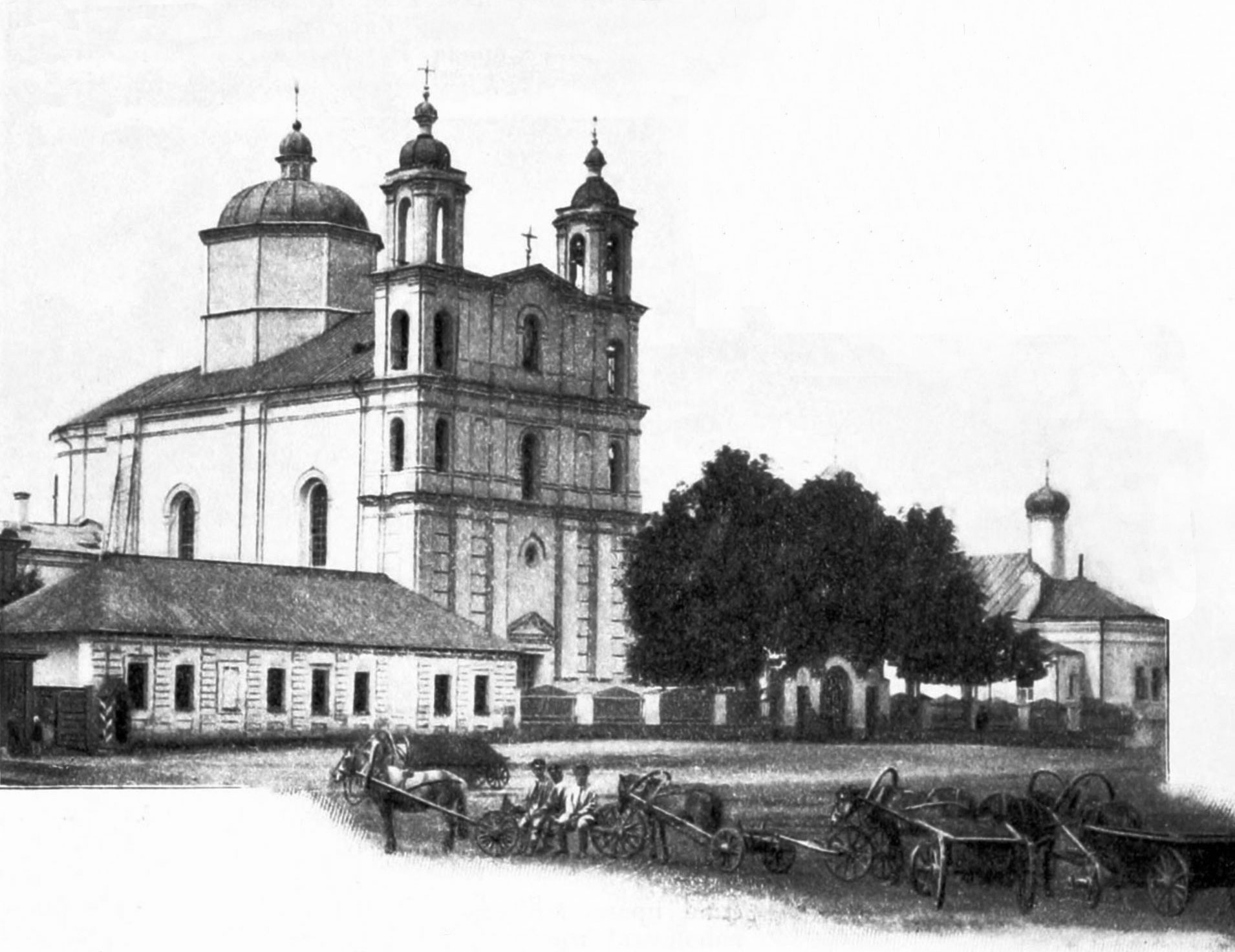
Former Carmelite church in the late 19th century

In a Royal privilege of Stephen Báthory from 1571, the settlement was mentioned as a village. King Władysław IV Vasa granted Magdeburg rights.

=== Jewish history ===
It once was a substantial Jewish shtetl, which dated from the 17th century, as appears from a charter granted to the Jews January 11, 1667, by Michał Kazimierz Pac, castellan of Wilno, and confirmed by King Augustus III of Poland. March 9, 1739.

In 1780, at the time of a visit of Catherine II, there was a Jewish population of 355, in 1,057; and the town possessed one synagogue. In 1803 the Jewish population was 453, in 1,185; in 1870 it was 2,433, in 4,167; and in 1897, 2,775, in about 6,000. Some of the Jewish artisans were employed in the tanneries and in silk and woolen factories. The Jewish population in the district of Chavusy (including the town) as of the 1897 Russian census was 7,444, or 8.42 per cent of the total population.

Chavusy was occupied during World War II by the Germans beginning in July 1941. Though a portion of the Jewish population was able to escape before the Germans arrived, the remaining Jews were registered, marked and subjected to forced labor under the German occupation. The first two round-ups of Jews occurred in August 1941, in which approximately 50 Jews were killed. Overall, approximately 675 Jews were executed in Chavusy. In 1952-53, thanks to funds collected from the relatives of victims, the remains of the victims were reburied at the Jewish cemetery. A total of 127 bags of remains were reburied, and the first memorial was erected in 1958, which was later replaced by a second one.

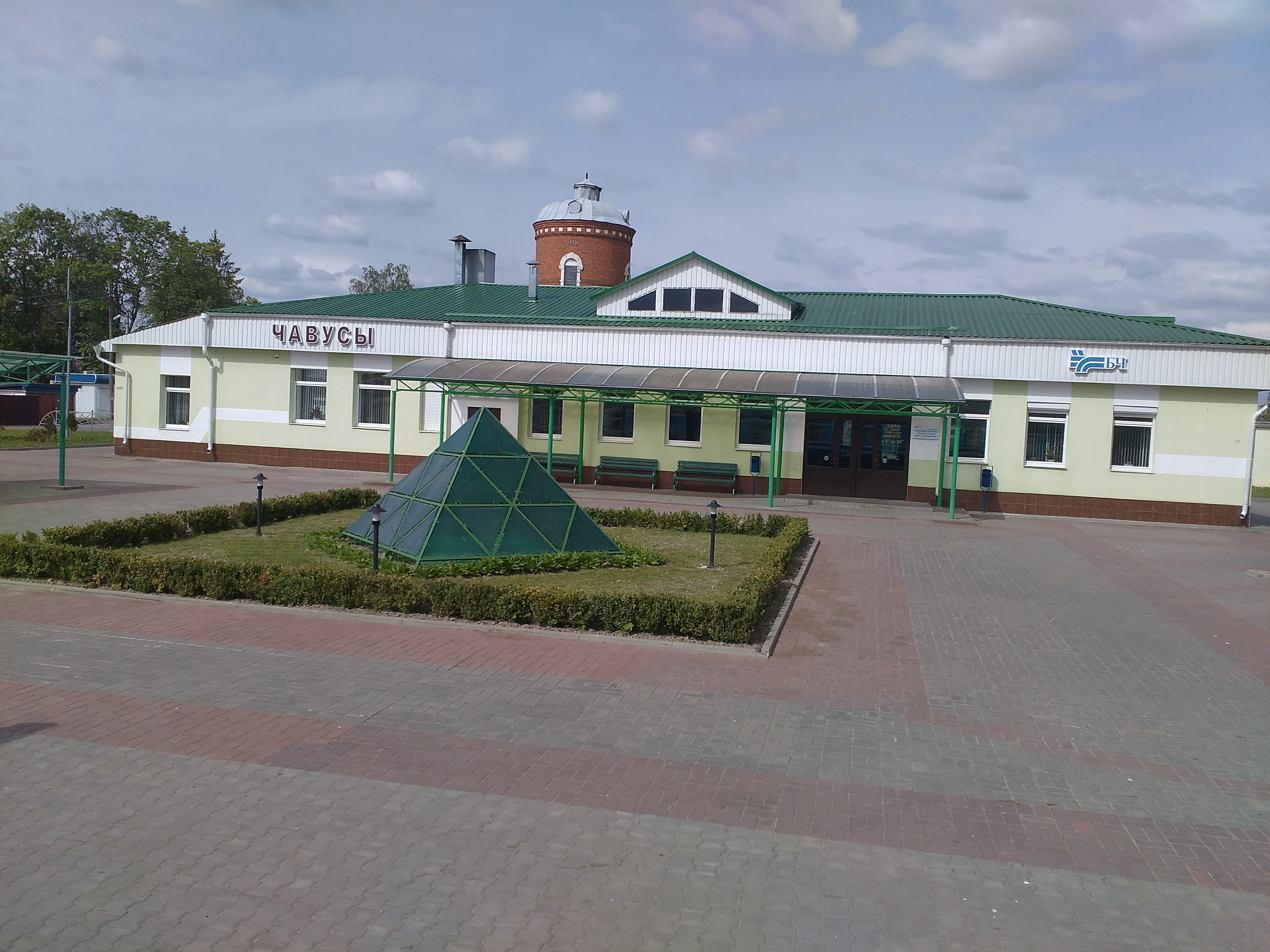
Train station in Chausy

== Notable residents ==
- Leonid Yurkevich (1908–1937). Belarusian poet. He began publishing in 1924. His first poetry collections were published in 1930. He worked in newspaper editorial offices.
- Alexander Akentyev (born 1950). Belarusian architect. His main works include: the reconstruction project for the pioneer development area in Novopolotsk and the development of the Aeroport microdistrict in Polotsk; and the master plans for Svetlogorsk and Molodechno.
- Berta Sosina-Izraitel (1903–1982). Belarusian scientist in the field of radiology. Author of scientific papers on functional radiodiagnostics of gastrointestinal and cardiovascular injuries. She was one of the first in the country to use cardiac radiokymography.
- Konstantin Renard (1884–1961). Scientist in the field of plant breeding, seed production, and floriculture. He is the author of scientific works on flax and cereal breeding, as well as floriculture. He is the creator of varieties of malting barley and long-grain flax. He is the author of over 70 scientific papers.
- Vladimir Kudrevich (1884 – 1957) was a Belarusian landscape painter. From 1909, he participated in art exhibitions. His main works include "Old Minsk," "On the Dnieper," "Belarusian Village," and "Along the Roads of War." He ran an art studio and performed as an actor.
- Izyaslav Kotlyarov (born 1938) was a Belarusian poet and journalist. His poems were published in the magazines "Znamya," "Yunost," "Novy Zhurnal" (New York), and in almanacs. He translated poems by Belarusian poets into Russian. Author of poetry collections: "My Peer," "Our Yard," "Dialogue = Dialogue," and others.
- Sergey Novikov (born 1979). Belarusian biathlete, silver medalist in the 2010 Olympic individual biathlon, three-time Winter Universiade champion, and two-time European champion. He is an Honored Master of Sports of the Republic of Belarus. He participated in the 2006 Olympic Games.
- Ekaterina Ivanchikova (born 1987), singer
