= Anatoly Dyakonov =

Soviet Army lieutenant general

Anatoly Aleksandrovich Dyakonov
- Dyakonov, 1947
- Born: 24 June 1907; Zimniki, Don Host Oblast, Russian Empire
- Died: 8 August 1972 (aged 65) Moscow, Soviet Union
- Allegiance: Soviet Union
- Branch: Red Army (later Soviet Army)
- Service years: 1929–1963
- Rank: Lieutenant general
- Commands: 257th Rifle Division; 83rd Rifle Corps; 56th Rifle Corps; 8th Guards Airborne Corps
- Conflicts: World War II
- Awards: Hero of the Soviet Union; Order of Lenin (2); Order of the Red Banner (2)

Anatoly Aleksandrovich Dyakonov (Russian: Анатолий Александрович Дьяконов; 24 June 1907 – 8 August 1972) was a Soviet Army lieutenant general and a Hero of the Soviet Union.

== Early life and prewar service ==
Dyakonov was born on 24 June 1907 in the khutor of Zimniki, Glazunovskaya stanitsa, Don Host Oblast. He worked as a physical education instructor in Novonikolayevsky District, then from June 1926 went on Komsomol work as a pioneer leader and physical education instructor in Leninsky District of Rostov-on-Don.

In November 1929 Dyakonov was conscripted into the Red Army and sent to become a cadet in the one-year conscript training detachment of the 84th Rifle Regiment of the 28th Mountain Rifle Division of the North Caucasus Military District at Ordzhonikidze. After completing training in October 1930, he passed the external examination to become a platoon leader and then served with the regiment as commander of rifle and training platoons and rifle and reconnaissance companies. With the regiment, he fought in the suppression of revolt against Soviet rule in Chechnya and Ingushetia between 1929 and 1932. Dyakonov graduated from the correspondence department of the Budyonny Military Electrotechnical Academy of the Red Army in 1936. He transferred to the 82nd Mountain Rifle Regiment of the division at Grozny to become its assistant chief of staff in August 1938. In August 1939, as a result of the Battles of Khalkhin Gol, Dyakonov was sent to the Transbaikal to serve as chief of the 2nd (reconnaissance) section of the staff of the 114th Rifle Division of the Transbaikal Military District.

== World War II ==
With the rank of captain, Dyakonov was sent to the Northwestern Front to fight in the Winter War in late 1939, and appointed commander of the 60th Separate Volunteer Ski Detachment, formed in the 7th Army and designed to bypass Finnish lines on the Gulf of Finland. The detachment fought together with the 86th Motor Rifle Division in the battles for the Koivisto Islands and Koivisto. Subsequently Dyakonov led a group of soldiers on a 25-kilometer night march into the rear of the Finnish fortifications defending Tiurinsaari island and attacked elements of the garrison, capturing and holding positions on the island, which enabled the ski detachment to carry out its mission. In the battle they were credited with killing up to 300 Finnish soldiers and capturing elements. His battalion went on to cut the Vyborg–Helsinki highway. These actions were described by the writer Vladimir Stavsky in the eighth issue of the Krasnoarmeyets magazine for 1940. For his leadership, Dyakonov received the title Hero of the Soviet Union and was awarded the Order of Lenin on 21 March. In late February 1940, he took command of the 284th Motor Rifle Regiment of the 86th Rifle Division, but was wounded in action on 2 March during the battles for Vyborg, and evacuated to the rear.

After recovering, Dyakonov was appointed commander of the 380th Rifle Regiment of the 117th Rifle Division of the North Caucasus Military District at Kamensk-Shakhtinsky on 9 May. In the spring of 1941, he was sent to study at the Frunze Military Academy.

After Operation Barbarossa began on 22 June, Dyakonov left the academy, and in September took command of the 27th Separate Cadet Rifle Brigade. Until November the brigade fought in heavy defensive battles near Moscow, then was relocated to the Kalinin Front and fought in the destruction of the German forces around Lake Seliger, the capture of Molotitsy and the encirclement of the Demyansk Pocket. On 29 January Dyakonov, now a colonel, took command of the 257th Rifle Division of the 3rd Shock Army, which he led in the Toropets–Kholm offensive. Its units advanced more than 380 km in fighting from Ostashkov to Velikiye Luki, then went on the defensive. In the spring of 1942, the 31st Rifle Brigade and two ski battalions were placed under the control of the division, expanding its defensive line from 40 to 80 km. During the Battle of Velikiye Luki, the division distinguished itself in the capture of the city and other fortified points, for which it was converted into the 91st Guards Rifle Division on 18 April.

Dyakonov rose to deputy commander of the 43rd Army in March 1943 and served in the same role for the 4th Shock Army from 30 June. He took command of the 83rd Rifle Corps of the 39th Army on 20 July, leading it in the Smolensk and Dukhovshchina-Demidov offensives. The corps went on to fight as part of the 4th Shock, 6th Guards, and 43rd Armies in attacks towards Vitebsk, the Nevel Offensive, and the Gorodok Offensive, then until early April 1944 defended Nevel. From April 1944 to March 1945 Dyakonov completed an accelerated course at the Voroshilov Higher Military Academy, then was sent to the Far Eastern Front, taking command of the 56th Rifle Corps of the 16th Army on 27 March.

During the 1945 Soviet–Japanese War, Dyakonov led the corps in the invasion of South Sakhalin, in which it played a key role, in cooperation with the Northern Pacific Flotilla. In difficult conditions of swampy and mountainous terrain, its units broke through Japanese fortified positions of the Koton (Kharamitog) fortified region and rapidly continued on to Shiritoru, Ochiai, and Toyohara.

== Postwar ==
After the end of the war, Dyakonov continued to command the corps as part of the Far Eastern Military District. From December 1947 to December 1949 he completed the basic course at the Voroshilov Higher Military Academy, graduating with a gold medal. From February 1950 he commanded the 8th Guards Airborne Corps, then from March 1951 served as first deputy commander-in-chief of the Separate Guards Airborne Army. When the latter was reorganized as the headquarters of the Airborne Forces, Dyakonov became deputy commander of the Airborne Forces in May 1953. From June 1955, he served as general-inspector of the Airborne Forces Inspectorate of the Main Inspectorate of the Soviet Ministry of Defense. In July 1956, Dyakonov was sent to North Korea to serve as senior military advisor to the commander and chief of staff of the Korean People's Army, and in May 1957 became military attaché at the Soviet embassy in Pyongyang and head of the group of Soviet military specialists in Korea. Returning to the Soviet Union, he ended his career as assistant commander-in-chief of the forces of the Moscow Military District for higher educational institutions before retiring on 29 August 1963. Dyakonov died on 8 August 1971 in Moscow.

== Awards ==
Dyakonov was a recipient of the following decorations:

- Order of Lenin (2)
- Order of the Red Banner (2)
- Order of Suvorov, 2nd class (2)
- Order of the Red Star
- Medals
