= Leonid Chigin =

Soviet colonel (1914–1943)

Leonid Sergeyevich Chigin
- Born: 11 August 1914; Bukino, Gorbatovsky Uyezd, Nizhny Novgorod Governorate, Russian Empire
- Died: 19 July 1943 (aged 28) near Gusevo, Oryol Oblast, Soviet Union
- Allegiance: Soviet Union
- Branch: Red Army
- Service years: 1934–1943
- Rank: Colonel
- Commands: 78th Tank Brigade; 113th Tank Brigade
- Conflicts: World War II †
- Awards: Hero of the Soviet Union; Order of Lenin

Leonid Sergeyevich Chigin (Russian: Леонид Сергеевич Чигин; 11 August 1914 – 19 July 1943) was a Red Army colonel and a posthumous Hero of the Soviet Union.

Chigin served in the Red Army from the early 1930s as a junior officer in tank units, and was in a staff position when Operation Barbarossa began. After fighting in the Border Battles in the Baltics, he became commander of the 78th Tank Brigade in early 1942 and commanded it in the Battle for Velikiye Luki. Transferred to command the 113th Tank Brigade in April 1943, Chigin was killed leading the brigade during Operation Kutuzov and posthumously made a Hero of the Soviet Union for his actions.

== Early life and prewar service ==
Chigin was born on 11 August 1914 to a peasant family in the village of Bukino, Nizhny Novgorod Governorate. After graduating from primary school in 1925, he moved to live with his older sister in Borisovo-Pokrovskoye. Chigin graduated from a seven-year secondary school in 1928 and began working at a kolkhoz. Having joined the Komsomol the previous year, he was sent to the village of Rozhnovo on a Komsomol direction to supervise the village library in 1929. Chigin later participated in the construction of the Bor Glass Factory. Drafted into the Red Army in 1932, he became a cadet at the Gorky Tank School in May of that year. After graduating from the school, Chigin became a platoon commander in the Separate Reconnaissance Battalion of the 51st Rifle Division, stationed in the Ukrainian Military District, in November 1934. Chigin joined the Communist Party in 1937. He rose to company commander with the battalion before being sent to the Military Academy for Mechanization and Motorization for advanced studies in August 1938. Upon his graduation, Chigin was appointed chief of the 1st (operational) section of the staff of the 125th Tank Regiment of the 202nd Motorized Division of the Baltic Special Military District in May 1941.

== World War II ==
With his unit, Chigin fought in the Border Battles on the Northwestern Front, and within two months he became a battalion commander in the regiment, fighting in the area of Pskov and Staraya Russa. Serving as assistant chief of a section of the operations department of the staff of the 27th Army from October, he was wounded in the area of Demyansk on the 28th of that month, and fought in the Toropets–Kholm Offensive from January 1942. Appointed commander of the 78th Tank Brigade of the army on 3 March 1942, he was evaluated as a "strong-willed, competent, and a fighting commander" for his performance in the Battle for Velikiye Luki, and promoted to colonel on 22 February 1943.

Transferred to command the 113th Tank Brigade of the 15th Tank Corps in April 1943, Chigin arrived to lead the brigade while it was being rebuilt in the Reserve of the Supreme High Command at Plavsk. The brigade and its corps joined the Bryansk Front on 13 July to fight in Operation Kutuzov. Chigin led the 113th in the main attack of the corps when it entered battle on 19 July near the settlement of Aleksandrovsky, Oryol Oblast. He controlled the brigade by radio from the lead tank and was killed with his crew that day when a shell hit his tank during fighting for the village of Gusevo. Chigin's brigade was credited with destroying up to 40 tanks, 17 guns, and killing around 1,400 German soldiers during the fighting. For his actions, he was posthumously awarded the title Hero of the Soviet Union and the Order of Lenin on 4 June 1944. Chigin was buried in Gusevo.

He was survived by his wife, Anastasiya Mikhailovna. A bust of Chigin is located in nearby Zalegoshch, where a street is named for him.

Hero of the Soviet Union citation

Comrade Chigin, commanding the brigade from 15 May 1943, managed to knit together and prepare the personnel of the brigade for future battles against the German invaders in a short period of time. In the period of the fighting from 19 July 1943, the brigade, thanks to skillful leadership from Comrade Chigin, inflicted great damage to the enemy in men and materiel, destroying up to 40 tanks, 17 guns, about 1,400 enemy soldiers and officers and many other losses. Chigin was himself courageous, brave, and decisive. On the battlefield, Chigin, courageously fighting against the arrogant Fascist enemy, died the death of the brave. For [his] bravery and courageous leadership displayed in battle against the German invaders, Comrade Chigin [is] worthy of the award of the title Hero of the Soviet Union posthumously.
