= 11th Motor Rifle Division "Sultan Sanjar" =

Unit of the Turkmen Ground Forces

The 11th Motor Rifle Division "Sultan Sanjar" is a unit of the Turkmen Ground Forces. It descends from the 88th Motor Rifle Division of the Soviet Army, first formed in May 1957. It is currently based out of Serhetabat (formerly Kushka).

== History ==
=== Soviet Army ===
In May 1957, the 88th Motor Rifle Division (First Formation) was established at Belgorod-Dnestrovsky in Ukraine from the 14th Rifle Division (Odesa Military District). It was redesignated the 180th Motor Rifle Division in November 1964. In 1980, it was reestablished at Kushka, in the Turkmen SSR. It replaced the 5th Guards Motor Rifle Division of the Turkestan Military District, which had been dispatched to Afghanistan. In 1982, it came under the control of the 36th Army Corps. In March 1989, it absorbed the returning 5th Guards Motor Rifle Division without inheriting any awards.

=== Turkmen Army ===
After the dissolution of the Soviet Union, the unit was inherited by the Government of Turkmenistan. In May 1992, it was taken over by the Armed Forces of Turkmenistan. According to former Soviet Ground Forces personnel, after the collapse of the Soviet Union, the 5th Guards Motorized Rifle Division was renamed into a division named after Saparmurat Niyazov with a deployment in Kushka. According to other sources, the name of Turkmenbashi was assigned to the 22nd Motorized Rifle Division stationed in the city of Kizyl-Arvat (now Serdar). In July 2004, by the decree of the President of Turkmenistan Niyazov, the division was renamed to the Turkmen 11th Motor Rifle Division, "Sultan Sanjar", named after Sultan Ahmad Sanjar. Its forces are concentrated on the Afghanistan-Tajikistan border.
