= Turkmen Ground Forces =

- Türkmenistanyň gury ýer güýçleri / Түркменстаның гуры ер гүйчлери
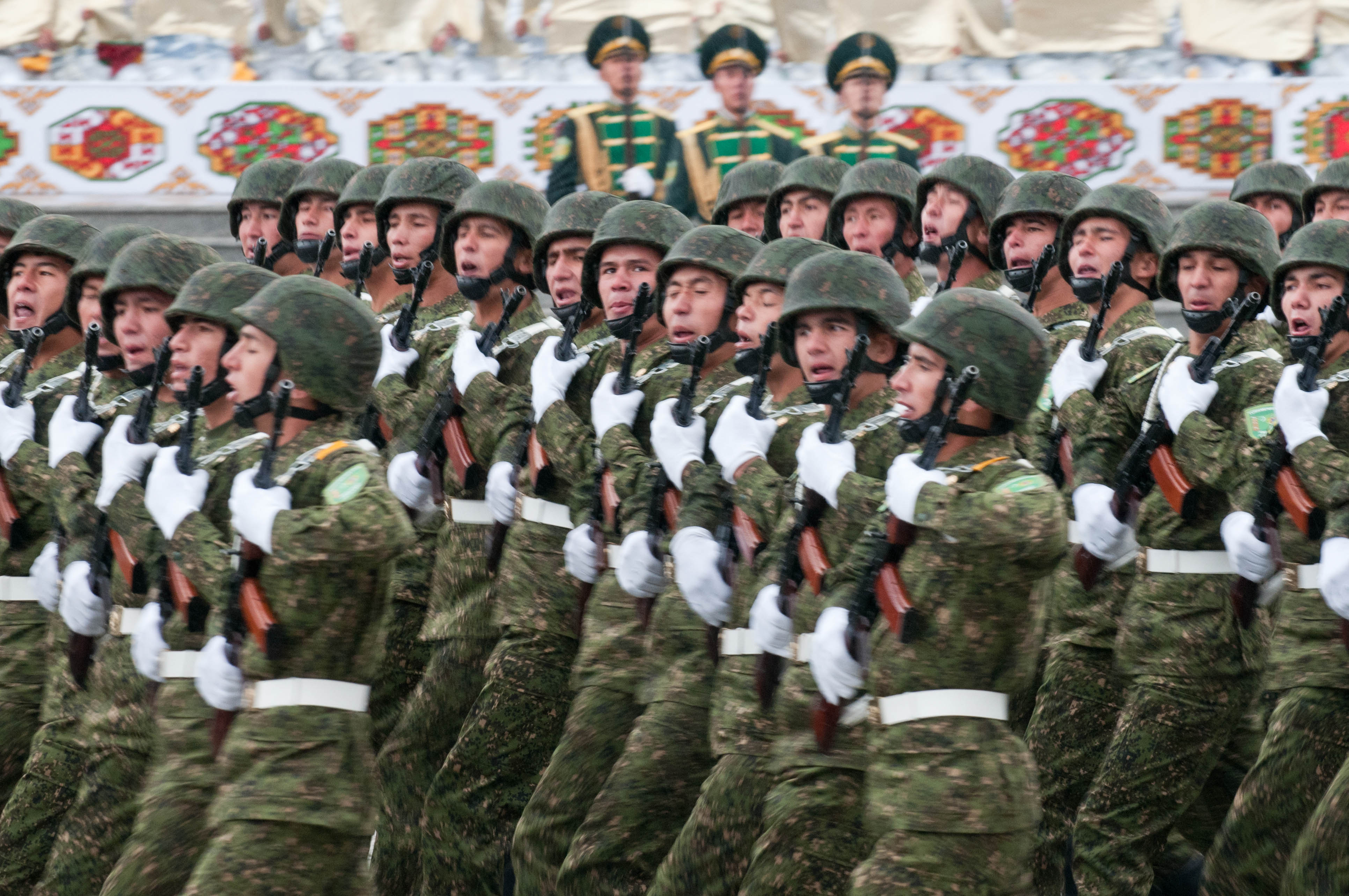
- Turkmen infantry
- Founded: 1992
- Country: Turkmenistan
- Type: Army
- Role: Ground warfare
- Size: 42,758 troops
- Part of: Armed Forces of Turkmenistan
- Headquarters: Ashgabat
- Colors: Green
- Anniversaries: 27 January

Commanders
- Supreme Commander-in-chief: Serdar Berdimuhamedow
- Commander of the Turkmen Ground Forces: Colonel Rovshen Ayazov

Insignia
- Flag

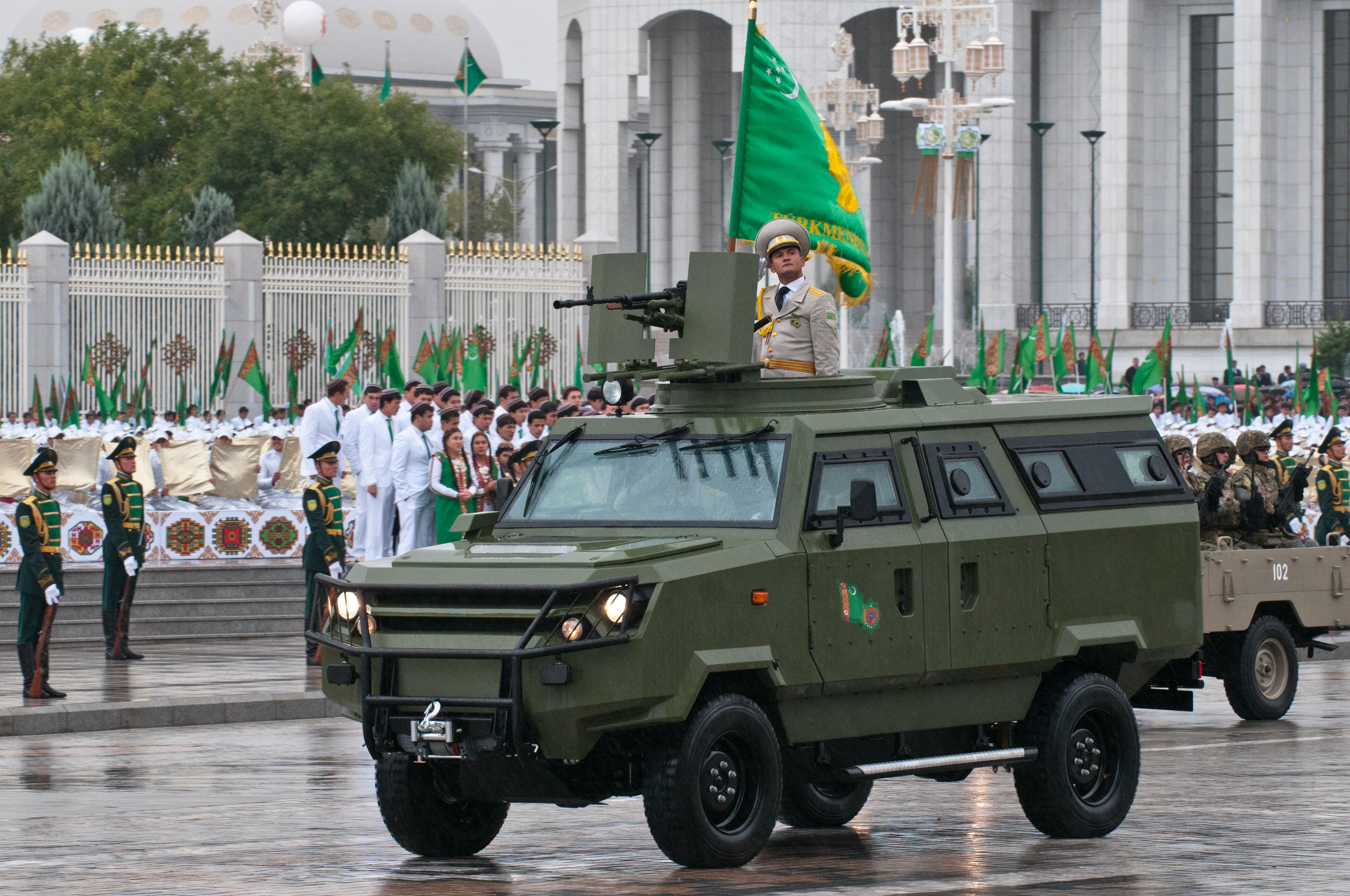
An armored vehicle during a parade in 2011

The Turkmen Ground Forces (Turkmen: Türkmenistanyň gury ýer güýçleri) is the army branch of the Armed Forces of Turkmenistan. The ground forces include the 2nd, 3rd, 11th, and 22nd Motor Rifle Divisions as well as smaller units consisting of various types of troops.

== History ==
The basis of the present-day Turkmen Ground Forces are several rifle divisions from the Turkestan Military District (based in neighboring Uzbekistan) of the Soviet Armed Forces. Of these units, the 36th Army Corps was stationed in the Turkmen SSR. More than 50,000 former Soviet Army personnel were either withdrawn or fired following the creation of the national defence ministry. This was more than half the Soviet troops who operated in the Turkmen SSR at the end of 1991. The interim army commanders in the first half of the 1990s included Major General Viktor Zavarzin and Lieutenant General Nikolai Kormiltsev (chief of staff and commander of the Separate Combined-Arms Army of Turkmenistan respectively). By 1993, the ground forces operated 200 military units, 70 of which were under joint Turkmen-Russian jurisdictions. The ground forces had been reduced to about 11,000 by 1996, which was organized into a singular army corps. The army has celebrated 27 January as Defender of the Fatherland Day since 2009.

== Structure ==
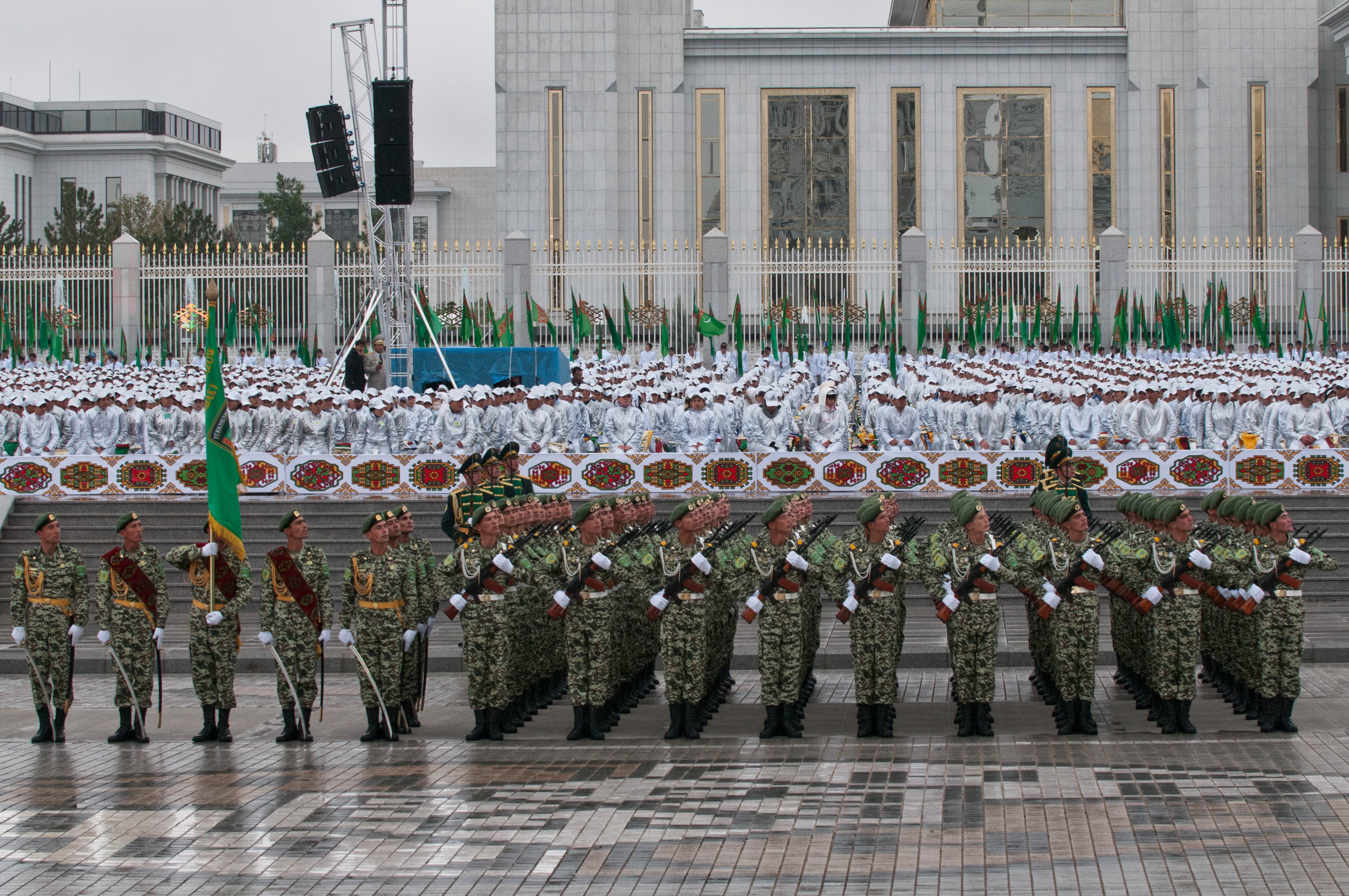
Anti-aircraft units

Units of the Ground Forces are located in each of the five military districts: Ahal Military District, Balkan Military District, Dashoguz Military District, Lebap Military District, Mary Military District. Direct operational control of the ground forces is carried out by the General Staff of the Armed Forces of Turkmenistan.

In late 2017, the International Institute for Strategic Studies listed the Ground Forces with a special forces regiment; a tank brigade, reportedly the 14th; the 3rd Motor Rifle Division, of a tank regiment, three motor rifle regiments, and an artillery regiment; the 22nd Motor Rifle Division "Atamyrat Niyazov" with one tank regiment, one motor rifle regiment, and an artillery regiment; four motor rifle brigades; a naval infantry brigade, and the 2nd Training Motor Rifle Division "Alp Arslan". The IISS also listed smaller formations: a Scud brigade with SS-1 Scud; an artillery brigade; a mixed artillery/anti-tank regiment; a multiple rocket launcher brigade; an anti-tank regiment; an engineer regiment; and two surface-to-air missile brigades.

An undated list of Ground Forces units included the following:

- 2nd Training Motor Rifle Division "Alp Arslan" (Headquarters Tejen in the Ahal Region)
  - 1 Tank Regiment
  - 1 Motorized Rifle Regiment
  - 1 Artillery Regiment
- 3rd Motorized Rifle Division named Bairam Khan (Headquarters Ashgabat)
  - 1 Tank Regiment
  - 3 Motorized Rifle Regiments
  - 1 Artillery Regiment
- 11th Motor Rifle Division "Sultan Sanjar" (Headquarters Serhetabat, Mary Region)
  - 1 Tank Regiment
  - 1 (23rd) Motorized Rifle Regiment
  - 1 Artillery Regiment
- 22nd Motorized Rifle Division named after Hero of Turkmenistan Atamyrat Niyazov (Headquarters Serdar, Balkan Region)
  - 1 Tank Regiment
  - 1 Motorized Rifle Regiment
  - 1 Artillery Regiment
- 4th Separate Motorized Rifle Brigade named after Tughril (deployed in the city of Kerki, Lebap Region)
- 5th Separate Motorized Rifle Brigade named after Chaghri Beg
- 6th Separate Motorized Rifle Brigade named after Gorogly Beg
- 152nd Independent Air Assault Battalion
- Artillery Brigade (deployed near Ashgabat)
- Independent Anti-Tank Regiment
- Independent Mixed Artillery Anti-Tank Regiment
- Rocket-propelled Artillery Team (deployed near Ashgabat)
- Anti-aircraft Missile Brigade named after Saparmurat Niyazov
- Anti-aircraft Missile Brigade
- Independent Engineer Regiment (deployed near Ashgabat)
- Independent Honor Guard Battalion of the Ministry of Defence (deployed in Ashgabat)

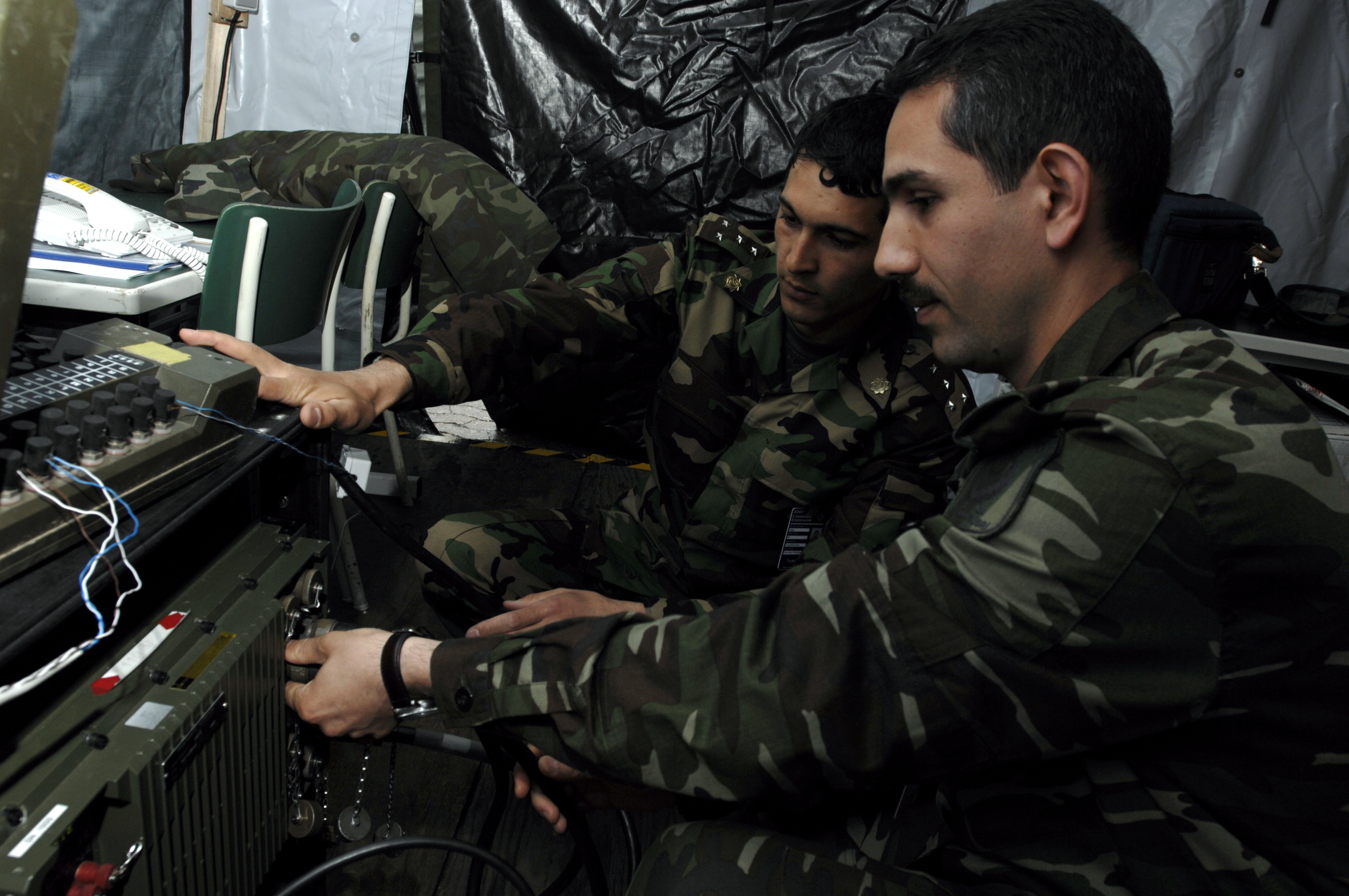
Turkmen Captain Ali Tuvakklychev with his Azeri counterpart during the exercise Combined Endeavor 2007 in Germany.

== Facilities ==
- Kelyata Training Center (Bäherden District of the Ahal Region)
- Northern Kelete Training Ground (near the village of Kelete)
- Mountain Training Center "South Kelyata" (near Ashgabat)

== Traditions ==
=== Battle Banners ===
To receive a battle banner, commanders of military units approach the Supreme Commander-in-Chief, receiving the battle banner from his hands and handing it over to the standard bearer. Then, having unfurled the green battle banners, groups of standard-bearers led by their commanders, chasing a step, pass in front of the line of participants in the current ceremony and take their places. It occurs on holidays such as State Flag and Constitution Day.

=== Cavalry ===
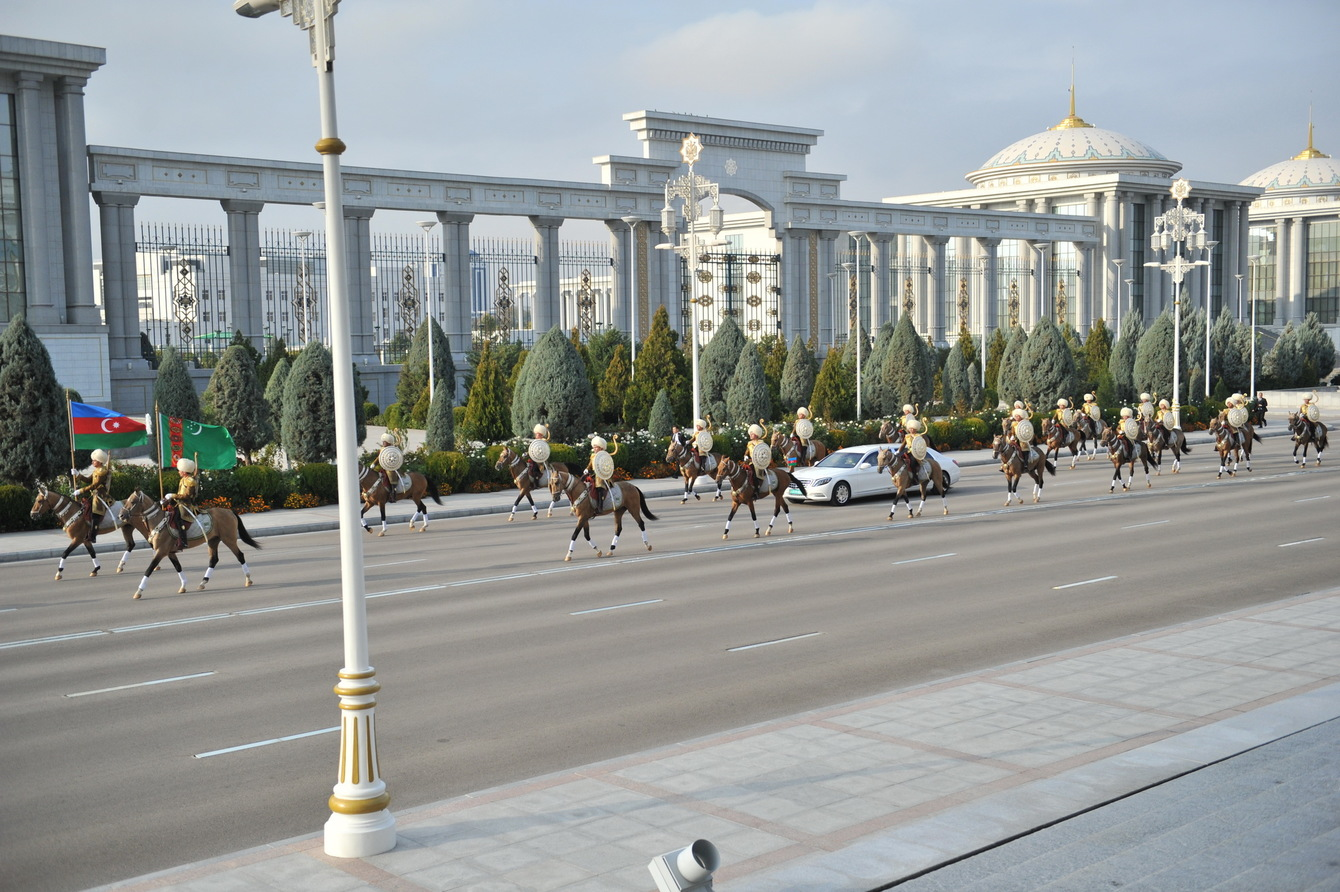
Mounted army cavalry in Ashgabat.

In October 2012, special cavalry units were ordered to be established in the ground forces. That same year, the Equestrian Complex of the Ministry of Defense was opened.

=== Ranks ===
In 2003, President Niyazov called for the strengthening of the Ground Forces in accordance with national traditions. Speaking at the Defence Ministry, he said that the Turkmen "esger" (warrior) carries more respect that just “soldier”. As a result, he reverted the ranks to traditional names and structure:

- Esger - warrior
- Onbashi - leader of 10 (section leader)
- Yuzbashi - leader of 100 (junior officer)
- Munbashi - leader of 1000 (senior officer)
- Goshunbashi - Army commander

The rank of a marshal was also reintroduced. These ranks were all reverted to their more russified predecessors after his death in 2006.

== Personnel ==
=== Conscripts ===
Service in the army is required for all males under 27 years of age. Only some of the conscript's time in the military is occupied with military service, the rest being occupied with "labour" (half a day) and "self-improvement" (2–3 hours a day) by reciting traditional Turkoman texts, learning songs and playing music. Minister of Defence Dangatar Kopekov stated in 1992 that legislation was drafted to where draft dodgers would face "very severe measures, including criminal responsibility". Despite this, desertion is rampant, and was at a 20% rate in 1994. In August 2020, a Turkmen court sentenced Jehovah's Witness siblings to two years in prison for conscientious objection to military service.

== See also ==
- Armed Forces of Turkmenistan
- Turkmen Naval Forces
- Turkmen Air Force
- Begench Beknazarov
