= Gusevo =

Gusevo (Russian: Гусево) is the name of several rural localities in Russia.

- Gusevo, Bashkortostan, a village in the Gusevsky Rural Settlement of Abzelilovsky District
- Gusevo, Kaliningrad Oblast, a settlement in the Mozyrsky Rural Settlement of Pravdinsky District
- Gusevo, Oryol Oblast, a village in the Bortnovskoye Rural Settlement of Zalegoshchensky District
