= Turkestan Military District =

Military district of the Russian Empire and Soviet Union

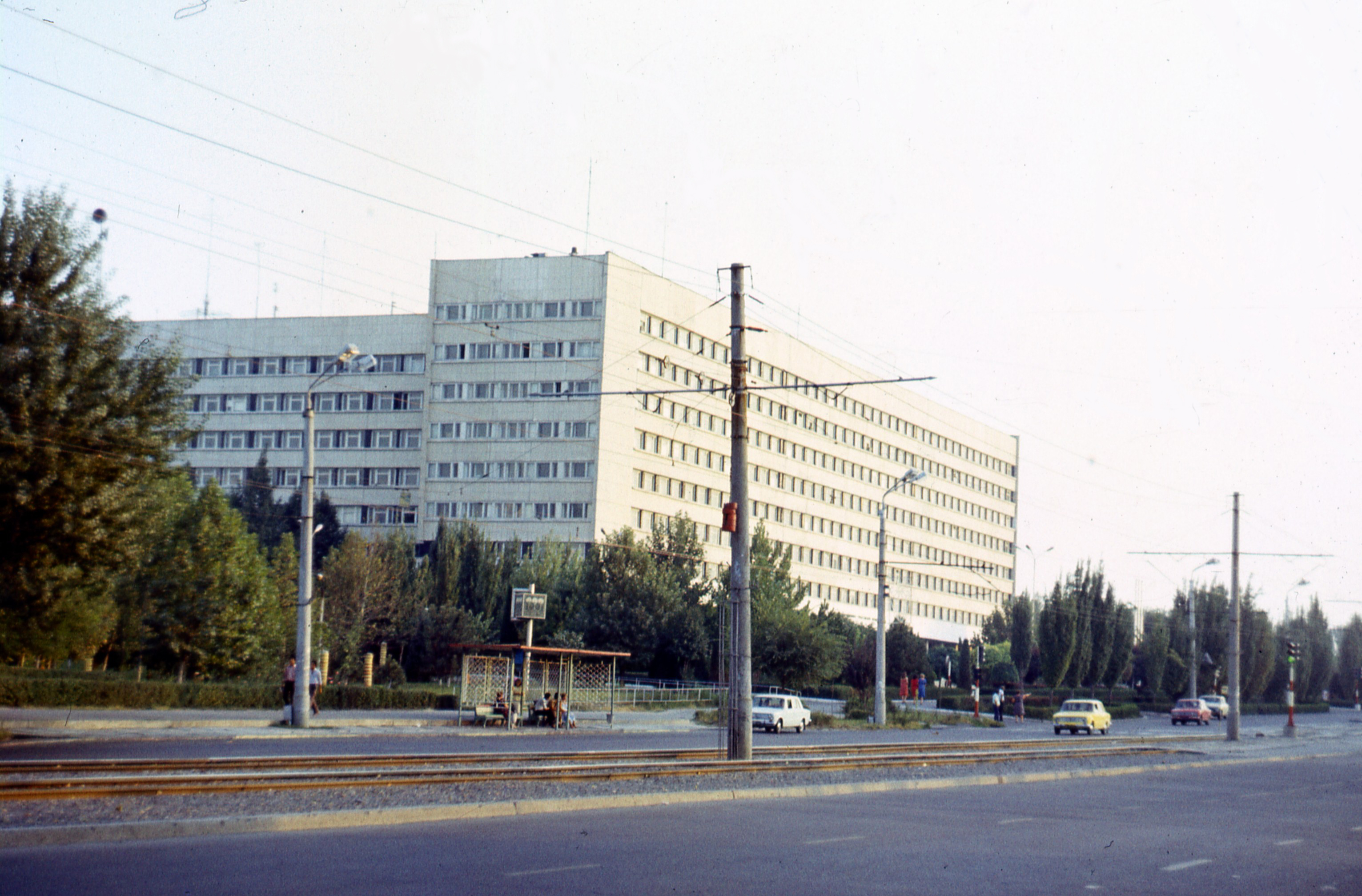
- Staff building of the Turkestan Military District, Tashkent, 1977
- Active: 1867–1920; 1945–1992
- Country: Russian Empire (1867–1917); Soviet Union (1945–1991); CIS (1991–1992); Kazakhstan; Kyrgyzstan; Tajikistan; Turkmenistan; Uzbekistan
- Type: Military district
- Headquarters: 100 Maxim Gorky Avenue, Tashkent
- Engagements: Russian conquest of Central Asia; Russian Civil War; Soviet–Afghan War
- Decorations: Order of the Red Banner

Commanders
- Notable commanders: Ivan Yefimovich Petrov

In 1989

The Turkestan Military District (Russian: Туркестанский военный округ (ТуркВО), Turkestansky voyenyi okrug (TurkVO)) was a military district of both the Imperial Russian Army and the Soviet Armed Forces, with its headquarters at Tashkent. The District was first created during the 1874 Russian military reform when by order of Minister Dmitry Milyutin the territory of Russia was divided into fourteen military districts. Its first commander was Konstantin Petrovich von Kaufmann, who was also Governor-General of Russian Turkestan at the time.

== History ==
=== Turkmen Horse Half-Regiment ===
The Turkmen Horse was a cavalry force forming part of the Imperial Russian Army prior to the Revolution of 1917. Numbering two squadrons in peacetime, it was recruited from the Moslem Tekin tribesmen of the Turkestan Military District. Recruitment was on a voluntary basis with the men providing their own horses and equipment, and the Tsarist government paying an allowance and issuing weapons. The Half-Regiment was derived from various Turkmen mounted militias first raised in the 1880s. Its uniform was modeled on tribal dress and included a distinctive striped kaftan and shaggy fleeced hats.

With the outbreak of World War I the native Turcoman cavalry recruited from Moslem volunteers was increased to a full division in strength. Following the overthrow of the Tsarist regime the Turkmen Horse formed the bodyguard of General Lavr Kornilov.

=== Central Asian Military District ===
From 1918 to 1926 the District was referred to as the Turkestan Front as its forces were conducting active operations against the Basmachi Revolt throughout practically all the District's territory.

In October 1919, Gleb Bokii was sent by Cheka head Felix Dzerzhinsky to Tashkent to head the operations of the Cheka in the Turkestan Front.

By USSR Order No. 304 of June 4, 1926, the Turkestan Front was renamed as the Central Asian Military District (САВО), which included the territories of the Turkmen and Uzbek SSRs and the Kirghiz and Tajik ASSRs. In connection with changes of administrative-territorial division of republics and areas of Central Asia, as of August 1940 the district included the Kazakh, Kirghiz, Tajik, Turkmen, and Uzbek Soviet Socialist Republics and their respective autonomous areas.

=== Turkestan Military District ===
This designation was re-created on 9 July 1945, after the division of the Central Asian Military District into the Turkestan and Steppe Military Districts. The new Turkestan and Steppe districts were formed from the headquarters of the 1st and 4th Shock Armies respectively. In September–October 1945 it included the 1st Rifle Corps (Ashkabad), with the 306th, 344th, and 357th Rifle Divisions, and the 119th Rifle Corps (Stalinabad ((Dushanbe)) with the 201st (Dushanbe), 360th (Termez), and 374th Rifle Divisions (Chardzhou). On 30 October 1945 the 374th Rifle Division left 119th Rifle Corps and was replaced by 306th Rifle Division. However in May 1946 306th Rifle Division was disbanded. In July 1946 the Steppe Military District was dissolved and its responsibilities transferred back to the Turkestan Military District.

After a number of changes to 119th Rifle Corps, including 201st RD being reduced in status to a brigade for eight months, in 1950 it comprised the 201st Mountain Rifle Division at Dushanbe and the 376th Mountain Rifle Division at Osh. In June 1955 the corps was renumbered the 33rd Rifle Corps and the divisions renumbered the 27th and 71st Mountain Rifle Divisions. The 71st Motor Rifle Division was then reduced into the 427th Motor Rifle Regiment in 1958.

In January 1958 from the abolished South Ural Military District the Turkestan District gained the territories of Aktyubinsk, Guryev and the West-Kazakhstan areas of the Kazakh SSR. In 1957 5th Guards Motor Rifle Division, the former 5th Guards Mechanised Corps that had ended the war in Germany with 4th Tank Army, moved to Kushka in the Turkmen SSR.

In 1960, with the entry into service of the BTR-50, the 427th MRR was reorganized into the 71st Motorized Rifle Division (cadre). In 1962, the 71st Motor Rifle Division was reorganized into the 34th Separate Reinforced Motorized Rifle Battalion (34th Motorized Rifle Battalion), which began to cover the state border with the PRC.

In 1968 the now-33rd Army Corps moved from Dushanbe to Kemerovo in the Siberian Military District.

The district initially covered most of Soviet Central Asia, but due to tensions between the Soviet Union and China the Tajik SSR, Kyrgyz SSR, and Kazakh SSR, the majority of the district area of responsibility, was split off to recreate the Central Asian Military District (SAVO), headquartered at Alma-Ata, on 24 June 1969. The Turkestan Military District was left with the Uzbek SSR and the Turkmen SSR. The 73rd Air Army was transferred to provide air support for the Central Asian Military District, while the Air Force of the Turkestan Military District was reestablished to provide control of air units stationed in the reduced territory of the district. Shortly afterwards in April 1970, the 1st Army Corps headquarters was relocated from Ashkabad to Semipalatinsk, where it became part of the Central Asian Military District. The Turkestan Military District was left with the 5th Guards Motor Rifle Division at Kushka and the 58th Motor Rifle Division at Kyzyl-Arvat in the Turkmen SSR, and the 108th Motor Rifle Division at Termez in the Uzbek SSR for ground combat units. It also included the 61st Training Motor Rifle Division at Ashkabad.

To replace the 1st Army Corps which had been moved northeast to Semipalatinsk, the 36th Army Corps was created in Ashkabad. The corps was created in 1982. It comprised two divisions - the 88th (created after the transfer of the 5th Guards MRD to the 40th Army) and the 58th Motor Rifle Division.

In the 1980s the District became part of the Southern Strategic Direction alongside the North Caucasus and Transcaucasus Military Districts. General Igor Rodionov commanded the District in 1985-6. Within the District's territory and under its command was the 40th Army, in Afghanistan, the 36th Army Corps, and other forces, totaling one Soviet Airborne Troops airlanding (the 105th Guards Airborne Division at Fergana) and 8 motor rifle divisions. Aviation support for the district was provided by the 49th Air Army, and air defence by the 12th Independent Air Defence Army of the Air Defence Forces. The VVS Turkestan Military District, created in 1969, was redesignated the 49th Air Army in 1988, with in 1980 a strength of three fighter and fighter-bomber regiments, a reconnaissance aviation regiment, a mixed aviation squadron, and a communications and automated control regiment.

From June 1, 1989, the Central Asian Military District was dissolved and its territory again incorporated into the Turkestan Military District, as part of the unilateral reductions which Soviet leader Mikhail Gorbachev had announced at the United Nations on 7 December 1988.

After the withdrawal from Afghanistan the 40th Army was disbanded. But in June 1991 it was reformed at Semipalatinsk from 32nd Army. Immediately prior to its dissolution, the 32nd Army consisted of the 78th Tank Division (Ayaguz); the 5202nd Base for Storage of Weapons and Equipment (VKhVT) Semipalatinsk, (prior to 1989 - the 71st Motor Rifle Division); the 5203rd VKhVT Ust-Kamenogorsk (prior to 1989, the 155th Motor Rifle Division); and the 5204th Base for Storage of Weapons and Equipment at Karaganda (prior to 1989 - the 203rd Zaporozhye Khingan Motor Rifle Division).

The District was finally dissolved on June 30, 1992 with the demise of the Soviet Union, when its forces were distributed between five newly independent Central Asian countries — Kazakhstan, Kyrgyzstan, Tajikistan, Turkmenistan and Uzbekistan. The most powerful grouping went to become the core of the Armed Forces of Kazakhstan which acquired all the units of the 40th (the former 32nd) Army and part of the 17th Army Corps, including six land force divisions, storage bases, the 14th and 35th Guards Air Assault Brigades, two rocket brigades, 2 artillery regiments and a large amount of equipment which had been withdrawn from over the Urals after the signing of the Treaty on Conventional Armed Forces in Europe.

The Museum of history of The Turkestan Military District is on Gorki Avenue in Tashkent, Uzbekistan.

== Commanders ==
=== Russian Empire ===
- Adjutant General, Engineer-General Konstantin Petrovich von Kaufmann; (07.1867 - 04.1882)
- Lieutenant General Mikhail Chernyayev; (05.1882 - 02.1884)
- Lieutenant General Nikolai Rozenbakh; (02.1884 - 10.1889)
- Lieutenant General Baron Alexander Borisovich Vrevsky; (10.1889 - 03.1898)
- General of Infantry Sergei Mikhailovich Dukhovsky (03.1898 - 01.1901)
- General of the cavalry Nikolai Alexandrovich Ivanov; (01.1901 - 05.1904)
- General of the cavalry Nikolai Nikolaevich Tevyashev; (06.1904 - 11.1905)
- Lieutenant General Dejan Subotić (11.1905 - 08.1906)
- General Evgeny Osipovich Matsievsky; (08.1906 - 12.1906)
- General of Infantry Nikolai Ivanovich Grodekov; (12.1906 - 03.1908)
- General of artillery Pavel Mishchenko; (05.1908 - 03.1909)
- General of the cavalry Alexander Samsonov; (03.1909 - 07.1914)
- General of Infantry Fyodor Vladimirovich Martson; (10.1914 - 07.1916)
- infantry general Mikhail Romanovich Erofeev; (07.1916)
- Adjutant General, General of Infantry Aleksey Kuropatkin (07.1916 - 02.1917)
- Colonel Leonty Nikolaevich Cherkes (03.1917).

=== Soviet Union ===
- Ivan Petrov - Army General: July 1945 - July 1952
- Alexei Radzievsky - Lieutenant General: July 1952 - April 1953
- Alexander Luchinsky - Colonel-General, from August 1955 Army General : April 1953 - October 1957
- Ivan Fedyuninsky - Army General : December 1957-December 1965
- Nikolai Lyashchenko - Colonel-General, from February 1968 Army General : December 1965 - June 1969
- Stepan Belonozko - Colonel-General : January 1970 -December 1978
- Yuri Maksimov - Colonel-General, December 1982 Army General : January 1979 -September 1984
- Nikolai Popov - Colonel-General, Army general from February 1988 : September 1984 -January 1989
- Ivan Fuzhenko - Colonel-General : January 1989 -December 1991
- Georgi Kondratyev - Lieutenant General, Colonel-General from 1992 : December 1991 -June 1992.

== Composition ==
In 1988-9, these forces included the:

- 40th Army (Kabul, Afghanistan)
  - 5th Guards Motor Rifle Division (Shindand, Herat)
  - 103rd Guards Airborne Division (Bagram, Afghanistan)
  - 108th Motor Rifle Division (Bagram)
  - 201st Motor Rifle Division (Kunduz)
- 36th Army Corps (Ashkabad)(formed May 1982)
  - 58th Motor Rifle Division (Kyzyl-Arvat)
  - 88th Motor Rifle Division (Kushka)
  - 154th Motor Rifle Division (Ashkabad)(mobilisation; activated 1972; part division 61st Training Motor Rifle Division)
- District Troops
  - 787th Independent Training Motor Rifle Regiment - 720th Training Centre (Shengeldi (ru:Ченгельды)), Saryagash District, Kazakh SSR)
  - 353rd Guards Artillery Brigade (Kattakurgan)
  - 845th Independent Rocket Divizion (Kattakurgan)
  - 135th Anti-Tank Artillery Brigade (Mary, Turkmenistan SSR)
  - 2nd Anti-Aircraft Rocket Brigade (Samarkand)
  - 162nd Independent Military-Transport Helicopter Regiment (Mil Mi-6, Mi-8, Mi-24V) (Kagan, Uzbekistan)
  - 399th Independent Helicopter Regiment (Chirchik)
  - 230th Engineer-Sapper Brigade (Samarkand)
  - 805th Independent Spetsnaz Company (Fergana)
  - 94th Pontoon-Bridge Regiment (Fergana)
  - 56th Independent Radio-Technical Brigade PVO (Chimkent)
  - 4th Guards Motor Rifle Division (Termez)(Military Unit Number 28345)
    - 365th and 367th Guards Motor Rifle Regiments; 1213th Motor Rifle Regiment; 304th Guards Tank Regiment; 837th Artillery Regiment; 1168th Anti-Aircraft Rocket Regiment, smaller units
  - 61st Training Motor Rifle Division (Ashkabad)
- 12th Independent Air Defence Army (HQ Tashkent)
  - 88th Communications Centre
  - 37th Air Defence Corps (Alma-Ata)
    - 737th Fighter Aviation Regiment (Ayaguz)
  - 15th Air Defence Division (Samarkand)
    - 9th Guards Fighter Aviation Regiment (Andijan)
  - 17th Air Defence Division (Mary, Mary Oblast)
    - 152nd Fighter Aviation Regiment (Ak-Tepe) (MiG-23M)(Formed 1950)
    - 179th Guards Fighter Aviation Regiment

== See also ==
- Central Asian Military District

== Notes ==
- Holm, Micheal (2015-01-01). "33rd Army Corps".
