= 2nd Training Motor Rifle Division "Alp Arslan" =

357th Rifle Division (August 1941 – March 4, 1955) 209th District Training Centre 2nd Training Motor Rifle Division (2000s-onwards)
- Active: 1941–1955; 2000s-present
- Country: Soviet Union (1941-1991); Turkmenistan (since 2000s)
- Branch: Red Army (1941-1946); Soviet Army (1946-1991); Turkmen Ground Forces (since 2000s)
- Type: Division
- Role: Infantry
- Garrison/HQ: Tejen, Ahal Region
- Engagements: Battles of Rzhev; Operation Seydlitz; Battle of Velikiye Luki; Battle of Nevel (1943); Operation Bagration; Riga Offensive (1944); Courland Pocket
- Decorations: Order of Suvorov

Commanders
- Notable commanders: Colonel Dmitry Kirshev; Lieutenant Colonel Batyr Mollayev

The 2nd Training Motorized Rifle Division named after Alp Arslan is a division of the Turkmen Ground Forces. Its headquarters is at Tejen in the Ahal Region. It traces its history to the 357th Rifle Division formed in August 1941 in Sarapul in the then Udmurt Autonomous Soviet Socialist Republic as a standard Red Army rifle division. It notably served on the front lines of the 1st Baltic Front during the Second World War. Particularly, it helped lead the 3rd Shock Army in the battle and siege of Velikiye Luki. By late October 1945, the division had been transferred to the Turkmen SSR, where it was re-designated four times as Soviet Army unit. It remained in Turkmenistan even after the events of 1991 and serves as one of four units in its armed forces.

In the summer and autumn of 1944 the 357th took part in the Riga Offensive into the Baltic states, and won the Order of Suvorov for its part in the liberation of that city.

== Formation and World War II ==
The 357th Rifle Division began forming in August 1941 in the Udmurt Autonomous Soviet Socialist Republic of the Ural Military District. Its order of battle was as follows:

- 1188th Rifle Regiment
- 1190th Rifle Regiment
- 1192nd Rifle Regiment
- 923rd Artillery Regiment
- 640th Sapper Battalion
- 219th Antitank Battalion
- 422nd Reconnaissance Company
- 377th Signal Company

On the first day of September Colonel Dmitry Kirshev was assigned to command of the division, a post he would hold until February 14 1942. The division was assigned to 39th Army while it was still forming, but by the time it reached the front it had been reassigned to 22nd Army in the Kalinin Front. By the end of January 1942, it was back in 39th Army.

=== Battles of Rzhev ===
During this period, the armies of Kalinin Front were deeply outflanking Army Group Center from the north, carving out the Toropets salient to the north and west of German 9th Army's positions in the Rzhev salient. During the rest of the winter the 39th Army was tasked with driving westwards to encircle and destroy these enemy forces in conjunction with Western Front attacking from the east. In the event, difficult terrain and supply shortages, plus desperate German resistance, frustrated this plan. On February 15 1942, Colonel Kirshev was replaced in command by Colonel Aleksandr Lvovich Kronik.

On July 2 Army Group Center launched Operation Seydlitz to finally liquidate this threat to its rear. On July 6 the corridor from Kalinin Front to its besieged 39th and 22nd Armies was cut at the village of Pushkari, north of Belyi, which encircled the 357th along with several others. Over the following weeks individuals, small groups, and even some formed and armed subunits managed to make their way through the encirclement lines, but despite this 39th Army reported 582 killed, 269 wounded and the enormous total of 22,749 missing in action in the month of July. 39th Army had to be reformed on the basis of the 58th Army headquarters. While enough of the division survived this ordeal to avoid being disbanded, by August 1 its remnants were in the Moscow Military District for rebuilding, which went on into September.

=== Battle of Velikiye Luki ===
By October 1 the division had been sufficiently rebuilt that it was assigned to the Moscow Defence Zone. On October 13 Kalinin Front received orders that several formations would be transferred to its command, in the buildup to the forthcoming Operation Mars. Among these was the 5th Guards Rifle Corps to reinforce 43rd Army. The 357th was directed to begin loading onto trains at Naro-Fominsk on October 15; however it is listed as still being in the Moscow Zone on November 1. The division arrived in 43rd Army later that month where it was assigned to 5th Guards Corps, but was soon sent, with its Corps, to reinforce 3rd Shock Army, which launched an offensive to retake Velikiye Luki and Novosokolniki on November 25. The 357th was described at this time as being at full strength for equipment and personnel, and that one in four (25 percent) were Party members or Komsomols. The division's Deputy for Political Affairs was senior Battalion Commissar V. A. Belov.

Major General Afanasy Beloborodov 5th Guards Corps was to take the leading role in the offensive. After forcing a crossing of the Lovat River and bypassing Velikiye Luki to the southwest, its objective was to cut the rail lines from Velikiye Luki to Nevel and Velikiye Luki to Novosokolniki, and to link up with other forces of 3rd Shock advancing from the northeast to encircle the city. The 357th was to then storm the city from the west while 9th Guards Rifle Division continued the advance on Novosokolniki. 46th Guards Rifle Division, on the left flank, was to cover the other two divisions against counterattacks from the southwest. On the eve of the offensive, forward detachments of all three divisions crossed the Lovat, suppressed the German advanced positions along the west bank, and then advanced to their main line along the Nevel railway; this reconnaissance-in-force both revealed much of the enemy fire plan and put artillery observers in position to direct fire against it in the opening preparation. As reinforcement, the 357th was assigned the 27th Tank Regiment and, as it was intended to attack a fortified city, it also got one battalion of the 358th Guards Artillery Regiment, consisting of 12 152mm howitzers. Altogether, with its own assets and the divisional and regimental artillery, the Corps had about 45 barrels per kilometre on the breakthrough front. The Lovat is not wide (25 to 60 metres) but has a fast current, steep banks, and few good approaches.

The night of November 24 was foggy, which hindered German illumination flares as the Soviet forward detachments crossed the river and entered no-mans-land and the German advanced posts fell back to their main position. By 0800 hrs. on November 25 the Corps had seized a bridgehead of about 14 square kilometres, and the 1192nd Rifle Regiment had advanced to the village of Peschanka. However, the supporting tanks had fallen behind during the night approach. The fog lifted after 1000 hrs., allowing the 30-minute artillery preparation to begin. The infantry attack began at 1100 hrs., but developed slowly because the enemy fire system could not be fully suppressed. As the 1192nd attacked Peschanka it came under flanking fire from height 158.1 and the village of Gorushka, which slowed its progress. Later in the day, Katyusha rocket volleys suppressed the German fire enough that the 357th was able to enter Gorushka, while the 9th Guards seized height 158.1. This last was a serious loss to the enemy line. Meanwhile, the 508th Guards Rifle Regiment of the 46th Guards found a gap in the main German line, and over the next day exploited into the depth of their defense.

While the Guards divisions created an outer encirclement of Velikiye Luki, the 357th moved as planned to cut the road and railroad immediately west of the city, beginning an inner encirclement, while still facing resistance from elements of the 251st and 257th Infantry Regiments of the 83rd Infantry Division, backed by rocket artillery and some armor. On the night of November 26/27 the first German reserves were identified, from the 20th Motorized Division and the 138th Regiment of 3rd Mountain Division. After painful progress through November 27, at 1500 hrs. Colonel Kronik was able to report that his troops had reached the Velikiye Luki - Novosokolniki road, sealed the Vorobetzkaya exit, and was attacking height 164.9. The division continued to make progress on the 28th, reaching out to the 381st Rifle Division which was advancing from the north. By the end of the day this was accomplished, while the 9th Guards had completed the outer encirclement. This produced an inner pocket of the Velikiye Luki garrison, and an outer pocket of the remaining defending forces, mainly the two regiments of 83rd Infantry and the 138th Mountain Regiment, which were holding out in and around the village of Shiripino.

It was clear to the Soviet command that the Germans would soon attempt to relieve the besieged city, which lay about 15km from their lines, by first breaking through to the Shiripino group (holding a pocket about 4 - 4.5km in length) before covering the remaining distance. The top priority for the Soviets was to eliminate the pocket. Army General Georgy Zhukov arrived, along with Kalinin Front's chief of artillery General N. M. Khlebnikov, and insisted on assessing the situation from Colonel Kronik's observation post, despite the fact it was under fire from two sides. The attack began on the evening of December 2, with 12 Soviet battalions including the full 1188th Rifle Regiment and the divisional training battalion. However, just as the artillery preparation was to begin, word arrived that the expected German relief attempt had begun; the lines of the 508th Guards Rifle Regiment had been penetrated and by morning the attackers reached the pocket, but the Soviet commanders on the ground organized counterattacks to prevent any further advance. The battle continued and at noon the 357th's training battalion captured Shiripino, while Major M. Ye. Kheifets' 1188th Regiment took Shelkovo. Although the German command was successful in evacuating some of its encircled troops, it was unable to hold its ground, and when the lines stabilized the distance to Velikiye Luki had barely lessened.

In anticipation of a further German effort to relieve Velikiye Luki, the 357th was transferred to the direct command of 3rd Shock Army on December 10. During the remainder of the month the division, along with the 257th Rifle Division and the 8th Estonian Rifle Corps, with significant assistance from corps- and army-level artillery, gradually ground down the city garrison. The encircled troops were reliant entirely on air-dropped supplies, and as the new year began were hanging on in the old fortress (Kreml) west of the river and in and around the railway station east of it.

Another German thrust to break through to the city began in early January 1943, and reached to within 8km of the Kreml before being halted. Two more desperate efforts were made on January 10 and the night of January 14/15, the last of which provided cover for a breakout from the Kreml position; only about 150 officers and men managed to reach friendly lines. The following day the rest of the garrison surrendered, bringing the battle to a close.

On February 22, Colonel Kronik was promoted to the rank of Major General. He remained in command until October 14, when he was given command of the 178th Rifle Division, which was also in 3rd Shock Army. He was replaced by the previous commander of the 178th, Major General Aleksandr Kudryavtsev, who held this post for the duration of the war.

=== Battle of Nevel ===
The 3rd Shock Army did not see much action through the spring and summer of 1943, and many of the reinforcements it had received for Velikiye Luki were reassigned. By September it was reduced to five rifle divisions (including the 357th) with an average strength of 5,000 - 6,000 men each; three rifle brigades; one tank brigade; seven assorted artillery regiments; and two field fortified regions. During that month Lt. General K. N. Galitsky was ordered to plan for an offensive in the direction of Nevel. This was mainly intended as a diversion to draw German reserves away from a larger offensive on Vitebsk by the rest of Kalinin Front and most of Western Front. The operation was to begin at 0500 hrs. on October 6 with a reconnaissance in force. The 357th was in the first echelon on a 4km attack front with the 28th Rifle Division to its south.

This reconnaissance was followed by a ninety-minute artillery preparation beginning at 0840, then bombing strikes. The infantry assault began at 1000, directly at the boundary between Army Groups North and Center. While the German 263rd Infantry Division contained the 357th's attack, to the south the 2nd Luftwaffe Field Division was unexpectedly routed by the 28th Rifle Division. The Luftwaffe division had been decimated during its first battles during Operation Mars nearly a year earlier, and had never completely recovered. The 28th penetrated the German's first defensive position by noon, and poured through the gap, followed by the 54 tanks of the 78th Tank Brigade, a truck-mounted regiment of the 21st Guards Rifle Division, an anti-tank and a howitzer artillery regiment. The city of Nevel, 25km in the German rear, was liberated off the march by the end of the day. Galitsky ordered the 357th, the 46th Guards Rifle Division, and the 100th and 31st Rifle Brigades, into the breach, and by October 10 a salient 25km deep and roughly the same distance wide was separating the two German army groups. The 357th was holding a sector east of Lake Iban, roughly along the Velikiye Luki - Nevel railway.

=== Polotsk-Vitebsk Operation ===
Later in October the division was reassigned to the 60th Rifle Corps in 4th Shock Army, in the renamed 1st Baltic (former Kalinin) Front. A new operation was planned to further exploit the breakthrough at Nevel after a pause for rest and regrouping. 4th Shock was tasked with driving to the southwest and south after making a breakthrough, threatening Polotsk and Vitebsk respectively and also threatening to encircle much of 3rd Panzer Army.

3rd and 4th Shock Armies, over the course of five days, made heavy attacks which dented 3rd Panzer Army's defenses before beginning the full offensive on November 2. 60th Rifle Corps, backed by the 143rd Tank Brigade formed 4th Shock's assault group, facing the German 87th Infantry Division and (a sign of their tremendous shortage of manpower) the partly reorganized 2nd Luftwaffe on a 10km-wide sector 16km south of Nevel. The Corps soon penetrated the German defenses to a depth of roughly 10km, at which point the 2nd Guards Rifle Corps was committed into the gap. Over the following weeks this Corps advanced south toward Gorodok while 60th Corps moved along the railway from Nevel toward Polotsk. By the end of the month the 357th had advanced with its Corps as much as 90km and had liberated more than 500 villages, while Hitler raged in his headquarters about the Schweinerei (filthy mess) around Nevel and ordered several attempts to seal off the breakthrough, none of which succeeded. However, 60th Corps remained 26km short of Polotsk, facing Combat Group von Gottberg (several composite battalions) and the 211th Infantry Division.

While most of the forces of 1st Baltic Front battled for Gorodok in December, and later attempted to liberate Vitebsk into January and February 1944, the 357th, with most of 60th Corps, remained on the defense along the same line.

=== Operation Bagration ===
In June the division was reassigned to the 1st Rifle Corps in 43rd Army, still in 1st Baltic Front, and was in positions north of the German salient at Vitebsk. Following a very heavy artillery barrage lasting 20 minutes at dawn on June 22, assault companies of the division, in concert with those of six other divisions, attacked the positions of the German 252nd Infantry Division and Corps Detachment D on a 20 km front, breaking through to the second defense line by noon. The following day the division assisted in the envelopment of Corps Detachment D's positions in Shumilino, advancing in second echelon behind its Corps-mates, the 179th and 306th Rifle Divisions. The 1st Corps reached the Dvina River by evening. From here, it was ordered westward, and reached Beshenkovichi by the end of June 25. By the 27th it had reached Lepel, against scattered German resistance.

=== Baltic Campaign ===
Along with its Army, in the following months the 357th advanced into the "Baltic Gap" between Army Groups North and Center, driving towards Riga and the Baltic coast. On July 6 it was past the Lithuanian border and was fighting on the outskirts of Švenčionys. Sgt. Aleksei Golubkov was an observer for the division's 923rd Artillery Regiment. Over the course of two hours he received three wounds while repairing breaks in his field telephone lines. Finally the German forces were reduced to holding a church, surrounded by a wall. Golubkov, assisted by a soldier named Nikolaiev, made a hidden advance to outflank the wall and suppressed the enemy fire, killing or wounding 18 German soldiers, and allowing the infantry to storm the building. In the process, Golubkov was mortally wounded by grenade fragments. For his gallantry, Sergeant Golubkov was posthumously named a Hero of the Soviet Union on March 24 1945. By the beginning of August the 357th had advanced as far as Kupiškis, moving generally northwest in the direction of Riga. Two weeks later it had reached the Latvian border southeast of Bauska, which 43rd Army liberated over the coming weeks.

On October 22 the division was recognized for its role in the liberation of Riga with the award of the Order of Suvorov. In January 1945, the 357th moved with its 1st Rifle Corps to the 51st Army, and then shifted with the 51st Army to 2nd Baltic Front in February. From March onward the division was part of the Courland Group, keeping guard over the remnants of the former Army Group North in its pocket on the coast of Latvia. When the war ended it was still in 1st Rifle Corps, which was now in the 1st Shock Army.

== Postwar ==
The 357th ended the war with the full title of 357th Rifle, Order of Suvorov Division (Russian: 357-я стрелковая ордена Суворова дивизия). About the end of September and October 1945, the division arrived at Ashgabat in the Turkestan Military District with the 1st Rifle Corps. It continued to serve well into the postwar era until it was finally re-designated as the 61st Rifle Division on March 4 1955. In early 1957 the division became the 61st Motor Rifle Division while the corps became the 1st Army Corps; it was reorganized as the 61st Motor Rifle Training Division in 1960, directly subordinate to the district headquarters. When training divisions became district training centers in 1987, the 61st was renumbered as the 209th District Training Center.

== Service in independent Turkmenistan ==
After the dissolution of the Soviet Union the center was taken over by the Armed Forces of Turkmenistan. By the early 2000s the 209th had become the 2nd Training Motor Rifle Division named for Alp Arslan at Tejen in the Ahal Region). The Alp Arslan honorific was awarded in July 2004. It consists of one tank regiment. one motorized rifle regiment, and one artillery regiment. It takes part in regular National Army exercises. Among their commanders is Major Amangeldy Berdiyev and Lieutenant Colonel Batyr Mollayev, who led the unit until June 2007, later became the Commander of the Turkmen Ground Forces. In August 2020, a Turkmen court sentenced Jehovah's Witness siblings to two years in prison for conscientious objection to military service in the division.

== See also ==
- List of military units named after people
