= Commander of the Turkmen Ground Forces =

Commander of the Ground Forces
- Türkmenistanyň medaragly Güýçleriniň gury ýer güýçleriniň serkerdesi (Turkmen)
- Flag of the Ground Forces
- Incumbent; Colonel Rovshen Ayazov since 2017
- Ministry of Defence
- Reports to: Chief of the General Staff
- Constituting instrument: Constitution of Turkmenistan

The Commander of the Turkmen Ground Forces (Turkmen: Türkmenistanyň medaragly Güýçleriniň gury ýer güýçleriniň serkerdesi) is the administrative head in the Turkmen Ground Forces, and is under the Chief of the General Staff and the Ministry of Defence. The current Commander of the Land Forces is Colonel Rovshen Ayazov.

== List of commanders ==
No.	Portrait	Name (born–died)	Term of office			Ref.
No.	Portrait	Name (born–died)	Took office	Left office	Time in office	Ref.
		Geldymukhammed Ashirmukhammedov	1997	2002	4–5 years	
		Colonel; Mashat Orazgeldyev	2002	24 June 2004	1–2 years	
		Colonel; Bayramgeldy Akummedov	23 June 2007	5 November 2009	2 years, 135 days	
		Lieutenant Colonel; Batyr Mollayev	5 November 2009	?		
		Colonel; Rovshen Ayazov	c. 2017	Incumbent	8–9 years	
