= 257th Rifle Division (November 1941 formation) =

- Active: November 1941–April 1943
- Country: Soviet Union
- Branch: Red Army
- Type: Infantry
- Engagements: Toropets–Kholm Offensive; Battle of Velikiye Luki

Commanders
- Notable commanders: Anatoly Dyakonov

The 257th Rifle Division (Russian: 257-я стрелковая дивизия) was an infantry division of the Soviet Red Army, the second unit to bear the designation during World War II. The division joined the 3rd Shock Army and was sent into battle in the Toropets–Kholm offensive in January 1942. Following the conclusion of the offensive, the 257th defended positions northeast of the city of Velikiye Luki for much of the year. For distinguishing itself during the Battle of Velikiye Luki in late 1942 and early 1943, the division was reorganized as the 91st Guards Rifle Division in April 1943.

== Formation and Toropets–Kholm Offensive ==
The 257th Rifle Division, the second of three unrelated units to bear the designation during World War II, was formed in Kalinin Oblast during November and December 1941, under the command of Major General Karp Zheleznikov, who arrived on 14 November. The division began forming in accordance with a directive of the Northwestern Front dated 8 November 1941 in the area of Kuzhenkino and Yedrovo. It included the 943rd, 948th, and 953rd Rifle Regiments, the 793rd Artillery Regiment, and smaller support units. The 943rd Rifle Regiment was formed from the Valdai Rifle Regiment, which arrived to the Kuzhenkino area on 12 November, while the 948th Rifle Regiment was formed from the 34th Consolidated Tank Regiment, which also arrived on the same day. The 953rd Rifle Regiment was formed from march companies of replacements that arrived at Vypolzovo during November and December. The 793rd Artillery Regiment was formed from the reserves of artillery of the front and stationed in the area of Yedrovo from 12 November. Support units were formed at Kuzhenkino between 12 and 15 November, and officers bringing the division up to strength began arriving on 10 November.

When the formation period of the division ended on 15 November, it included 5,805 men, 51 percent of its authorized strength, including 2,266 in the 943rd Rifle Regiment, 1,182 in the 948th Rifle Regiment, 415 in the 953rd Rifle Regiment and 958 in the 793rd Artillery Regiment. The division was also understrength in equipment, with only 27 percent of its authorized horses, 41 percent of its authorized vehicles, 37 percent of its authorized rifles, eleven percent of its authorized heavy machine guns, 41 percent of authorized light machine guns, and 32 percent of its authorized 76 mm guns. As a result, the division continued to be brought up to strength with personnel and equipment until 20 December, including 1,764 replacements received on 15 December. The front headquarters declared the formation of the division finished on 14 December, although the division lacked its authorized anti-aircraft and mortar battalions.

By the time the division concentrated for the offensive in the area of Lake Seliger on 1 January, it included 9,192 men with over 2,000 men in each infantry regiment, roughly three-quarters of its authorized strength. The ethnic makeup of the division was 68.5 percent Russian with the remainder 9.1 percent Ukrainian, 2.8 percent Belorussian, 5 percent Kazakh, 4 percent Tatar, 2.9 percent Chuvash, among other ethnicities. While holding defenses on the northeastern bank of Lake Seliger the 80th and 65th Separate Ski Battalions, 1334th Separate Sapper Battalion, and the 107th Separate Guards Mortar Battalion with Katyusha rocket launchers were attached to the division.

The 257th was sent to the 3rd Shock Army of the Northwestern Front, and entered combat for the first time during the Toropets–Kholm offensive in January 1942. By the start of the drive on Kholm on 17 January the division was 30 to 50 kilometers southeast of the town, positioned in the village of Apolets. On 19 January, simultaneously with the successful advance of the 33rd Rifle Division, the vanguard of the 257th reached the area of Losevo, implying a move on Velikiye Luki. On the next day, the division advanced on Velikiye Luki, followed by the 31st, 45th and 54th Rifle Brigades. On 21 January, the 257th entered Snopovo, cutting the road between Kholm and Toropets to encircle the German troops in the Kholm Pocket. Zheleznikov suffered a leg fracture in an accident on 23 January and was evacuated from the front, and division chief of staff Lieutenant Colonel Aleksandr Letunov became acting division commander. Continuing the advance on Velikiye Luki, the flank guards of the division engaged scouts from Gruppe Meyer during the afternoon of 27 January. The skiers of the division and partisan detachments operated against Gruppe Meyer, defending the gap between Kholm and Velikiye Luki. Colonel Anatoly Dyakonov took command of the division on 29 January. During the offensive, the 257th broke through German defenses northwest of Ostashkov in conjunction with other units of the army, and overcame stubborn resistance to develop the offensive towards Velikiye Luki. From late January to November, the division as part of the 3rd Shock Army of the Kalinin Front defended positions northeast of Velikiye Luki. On 15 June, the 31st Rifle Brigade and two ski battalions were placed under the control of the division, expanding its defensive line from 40 to 80 km. The brigade and ski units remained under division control until late September. During its months on the defensive, the division conducted reconnaissance raids against the opposing German positions with the goal of capturing prisoners and destroying infrastructure. Sporadic skirmishes took place between elements of the division and German troops seeking to improve their positions. In this period of relative quiet on the front, between 1 June and 20 September, the 257th lost 320 men: 100 killed, 188 wounded, two captured and 30 missing.

The 953rd Rifle Regiment of the division was shifted to the Kholm sector after a series of failed attacks against the Kholm Pocket in early April 1942 bled the Soviet forces there white. The regiment was transferred to the 391st Rifle Division on 9 April, taking over the positions of the 45th Rifle Brigade in Zeshki, near Dubrovo and Skaruyevo. The regiment came under the operational control of the 117th Rifle Division. Ahead of the next 3rd Shock Army offensive from 16 to 18 April, the 953rd took over the sector of the 159th Ski Battalion in Mikhaily. During the offensive, the regiment left behind one battalion to hold the entire regimental sector and with two battalions attacked from the southwest of Skaruyevo, but could not overcome the German defenses. The attacks of the 2nd Guards Rifle Corps failed and after several attempts on Skaruyevo the regiment retreated into the forest 700 meters to the southwest of the village. After the German counteroffensive began, the 953rd defended Zeshki from a small German force on 21 and 22 April. It went over to the defensive in that sector on 22 April. The regiment was subordinated to the 33rd Rifle Division on 24 April. As the German attack ground towards the relief of the Kholm Pocket, the 953rd was replaced by the 164th Rifle Regiment of the 33rd Division by the end of 5 May. That morning, German motorized infantry attacked units of the regiment in Zeshki from the direction of Dubrovo. During the fighting the regiment retreated, but soon counterattacked to retake Zeshki, restoring the positions before its relief. That day German troops broke the 105-day siege of the Kholm Pocket. The 953rd did not return to the 257th Division until 15 September.

== Battle of Velikiye Luki ==
During the winter of 1942–1943, the 257th fought in the Battle of Velikiye Luki to destroy the German garrison of the city, which was captured on 17 January 1943. For the battle in the city, the division trained extensively for urban warfare, practicing attacks upon mock German fortifications built from snow. Dyakonov created five assault detachments of up to a hundred soldiers from the personnel of the division, consisting of sappers, machine gunners, mortarmen, smoke screen deployers, artillerymen, and Ampulomet throwers. Each detachment included reconnaissance, assault, support, reinforcement, and reserve groups. The assault on the city began at 10:00 on 13 December with a Katyusha rocket salvo, followed by artillery preparation. The 357th and 257th Rifle Divisions attacked from the west, while the 7th Estonian Rifle Division attacked from the east. The artillery fire proved ineffective due to poor visibility and unsuppressed German machine gun fire brought the infantry to a halt. However, the assault groups of the 257th continued the attack with relative success, crossing the Lovat. The infantrymen followed the assault groups, clearing the remaining German centers of resistance. Due to lack of preparation, the 357th and the 7th Estonian Rifle Divisions, who attacked with reinforced battalions instead of assault groups, failed to achieve their objectives and the city was not captured by the target date of 16 December.

As a result, army commander Kuzma Galitsky decided to send the 249th Estonian Rifle Division into action to break the stalemate, while the 257th was ordered to capture strongpoints on the outskirts of the city that flanked the advancing forces. The offensive resumed in earnest on 18 December, with the 257th continuing its relatively successful advance, but the Estonian divisions made almost no progress and German reports indicated the defection of Estonian troops. Galitsky ordered the 47th Mechanized Brigade of the 2nd Mechanized Corps into action, with the 257th attacking from the north and the 47th from the south to split the German garrison in half. The assault began on 25 December, and by 30 December the 257th had captured the northern half of the city center, while the 47th made steady progress made possible by the defenders' lack of anti-tank guns. The infantrymen and tankers were separated by only four quarters of the city by the evening of 30 December. The following day brought the fiercest street fighting of the battle and by 1 January 1943 the majority of the city had been cleared of resistance. The 257th and 47th linked up, splitting the garrison between the area of the railway station and the old fortress.

Realizing the ineffectiveness of national divisions, Galitsky continued the offensive with the 257th and the 47th. In the following days, the 257th and 47th mopped up the remaining German resistance, finishing with the capture of the citadel on 16 January. By the end of the fighting, at 18:00 on 16 January, the division had a total strength of 3,344 men, with 1,570 in its three rifle regiments. The division received 5,020 replacements, overwhelmingly for its infantry, between 27 November and 10 January.

After the liberation of Velikiye Luki, the division was withdrawn to the second echelon of the army on 17 January, where it remained until 9 February. Between 10 and 12 February the division fought in the area of Gorovatka, 10 kilometers northwest of Velikiye Luki. During the three days of fighting, the 257th lost 465 killed and 811 wounded. This reduced the division to 2,008 men by 18 February when it was holding defensive positions. In March, Major General Mikhail Ozimin became division commander. For the "skill and courage" demonstrated by its personnel during the Battle of Velikiye Luki, the division was reorganized as the 91st Guards Rifle Division on 18 April 1943.
