= Karp Zheleznikov =

Soviet army general (1895–1957)

Karp Afanasyevich Zheleznikov
- Zheleznikov, c. 1945
- Born: 13 October 1895; Orsha, Mogilev Governorate Russian Empire
- Died: 16 January 1957 (aged 61) Gorky, Soviet Union
- Allegiance: Russian Empire; Russian SFSR; Soviet Union
- Branch: Imperial Russian Army; Red Army
- Service years: 1915–1918, 1918–1950
- Rank: Major general
- Commands: 33rd Rifle Division; 257th Rifle Division
- Conflicts: World War I; Russian Civil War; Polish–Soviet War; World War II
- Awards: Order of Lenin; Order of the Red Banner (2)

Karp Afanasyevich Zheleznikov (Russian: Карп Афанасьевич Железников; 13 October 1895 – 16 January 1957) was a Soviet Army major general who held division command during World War II. He is the father of the writer Vladimir Zheleznikov.

== Early life, World War I, and Russian Civil War ==
A Belarusian, Karp Afanasyevich Zheleznikov was born on 13 October 1895 in Orsha, Mogilev Governorate. During World War I he was conscripted into the Imperial Russian Army in May 1915 after graduating from a higher primary school in Orsha. Zheleznikov was sent to serve in the 73rd Reserve Infantry Battalion at Baranovichi as a private. In late June he was sent to the Western Front and joined the 224th Yukhnov Infantry Regiment. Due to being relatively well educated, Zheleznikov was sent to the 2nd Moscow School of Praporshchiks and after graduation as a warrant officer (praporshchik) on 1 May 1916 was appointed a junior officer in the 217th Reserve Infantry Regiment. During the February Revolution Zheleznikov was serving with the 37th Infantry Regiment at Yelnya, and during the October Revolution was with the 303rd Reserve Infantry Regiment at Zhizdra. With these units, he served as a platoon and company commander, and was promoted to podporuchik. In March 1918 Zheleznikov was appointed by the regimental committee to work as a member of a liquidation commission. After the disbandment of the regiment and demobilization, he lived in Zhizdra for a month, then returned to Orsha. In late May he was directed by the Orsha labor exchange to service in the Orshansky Uyezd Militsiya department.

Zheleznikov was mobilized into the Red Army during the Russian Civil War on 4 August 1918 and appointed assistant chief of the commandant section of the Orshansky Uyezd Military Commissariat. From March 1919 he served as military instructor of the Lioznensky Military Commissariat of the Vitebsk Governorate, and from July commanded a platoon and company of the 25th Rifle Regiment. With the regiment, he fought on the Southwestern Front against the Armed Forces of South Russia in battles in the area of Rossosh, Russkiye Brody, Livny, and Novosil. In late October 1919 he became seriously ill and was hospitalized until January 1920.

After recovering, Zheleznikov was appointed to the 58th Separate Battalion of the 1st Rifle Brigade of the Smolensk sector, where he served as a company commander and battalion adjutant. From October 1920 he was assistant commander of the 15th Separate Battalion of the brigade. With these battalions, he fought in the Polish–Soviet War on the Western Front between July and November 1920 in the areas of Volkovysk, Gorodishche, Glubokoye, Negoreloe, and Stolbtsy in Minsk Governorate, and Rakov, Rodoshkovichi, and others in Vilna Governorate. In November he fought against the forces of Stanisław Bułak-Bałachowicz in Ovruchsky Uyezd of Volyn Governate. Between December 1920 and January 1921 he was hospitalized at the 142nd Evacuation Point, then worked as an instructor in the 1st Company Sector of the Territorial Forces of the Orshansky Uyezd Military Commissariat.

== Interwar period ==
After the end of the war, Zheleznikov served with the 27th Omsk Rifle Division from November 1922 to January 1939. Until November 1923, he served as an assistant company commander in the 79th Kronstadt Rifle Regiment, then in the same position in the divisional school for training junior commanders. In August 1924 he transferred to the 80th Leningrad Rifle Regiment, in which he served as an assistant company commander, supply company commander, rifle company commander, 1st battalion commander, and acting chief of regimental staff. From April 1930 to November 1931 Zheleznikov completed the Vystrel course. Upon his return to the division, he was appointed to the 81st Red Banner Rifle Regiment, serving as assistant regimental commander for personnel before becoming regimental commander on 17 July 1937.

Then-Colonel Zheleznikov was appointed assistant commander of the 8th Rifle Division in January 1939, and in August of that year took command of the 33rd Rifle Division. He commanded the 33rd in the Soviet invasion of Poland, during which it advanced into territory annexed as part of the Byelorussian SSR. Zheleznikov was promoted to major general on 4 June 1940. The division was relocated to Latvia in June, where it become part of the 11th Army of the newly formed Baltic Special Military District.

== World War II ==
After Operation Barbarossa began on 22 June 1941, Zheleznikov commanded the 33rd as part of the 16th Rifle Corps of the 11th Army of the Northwestern Front in heavy defensive battles on the state border in the area of Kybartai, covering the sector from Gumbinnen to Kaunas. For 17 hours the division held its defensive positions, but at the end of the day were forced to retreat to the Pilviškiai area, where they took up defensive positions on the line of the Šešupė. Subsequently, as ordered by the 11th Army commander, the division conducted a fighting retreat on Kaunas and then on Jonava. On 25 June the division and its corps fought in a counterattack from the Jonava area to Karmėlava and Kaunas. The counterattack failed and the division was forced to withdraw further to the Idritsa and Sebezh area. For "the tenacity shown by the division in battles in the area of Kybartai, Vladislavov, Vilkaviškis, Marijampolė, and Jonava, personal courage in the breakout from encirclement in the Jonava area on 26 June, for tireless concern for soldiers and skillful leadership of the division in the breakout from encirclement across the Viliya and Western Dvina rivers," Zheleznikov was awarded the Order of the Red Banner on 31 August.

From 10 July, the division fought as part of the 27th Army of the Northwestern Front, being encircled twice and breaking out to Toropets, Sakhnovo, Loknya, and further to Kholm. After leaving the encirclement, the division was withdrawn to the Valday area for rebuilding. On 24 September Zheleznikov was relieved of command and demoted to command the 117th Rifle Regiment of the 23rd Rifle Division of the army. The regiment distinguished itself in early October in battles on the Lake Beloye and Lake Seliger bridgehead, and on 8 November Zheleznikov took command of the 257th Rifle Division, forming as part of the front. In late December the division joined the 4th Shock Army, then transferred to the 3rd Shock Army. The division fought in the Toropets–Kholm offensive, during which Zhleznikov suffered a serious leg fracture in an accident on 23 January and was hospitalized until September of that year.

The Sverdlovsk Garrison Military-Medical Commission classified Zheleznikov as fit for limited duty noncombatant positions in December 1942, and until January 1943 he was at the disposal of the Main Personnel Directorate awaiting reassignment. Zheleznikov was appointed chief of the Vladimir Infantry School, and from June 1944 was chief of the Gorky Suvorov Military School.

== Postwar ==
Zheleznikov continued in this position until his retirement due to illness in April 1950. He died in Gorky on 16 January 1957.

== Awards ==
Zheleznikov was a recipient of the following decorations:

- Order of Lenin
- Order of the Red Banner (2)
- Order of the Red Star
- Medals
