= 78th Tank Division =

Tank division of the Soviet military

78th Tank Brigade (1942–1945) 78th Tank Regiment (1945–1949) 15th Tank Division (1949–1965) 78th Tank Division (1965–1992) 78th Mechanized Division (1992–2003)
- Active: 1942–2003
- Country: Soviet Union (1942–1992); Kazakhstan (1992–2003)
- Branch: Soviet Army (1942–1992); Kazakh Ground Forces (1992–2003)
- Type: Armored
- Garrison/HQ: Ayaguz (1970–2003)
- Engagements: World War II: Toropets–Kholm Offensive; Leningrad-Novgorod Offensive; Riga Offensive (1944); Courland Pocket
- Decorations: Order of the Red Banner
- Battle honours: Nevel; Kabanbai Batyr

Commanders
- Notable commanders: Anatoly Kvashnin

The 78th Tank Division was a division of the Soviet Ground Forces, active from 1965 to the 1990s. It was originally established in 1949 as the 15th Tank Division, from the 78th Heavy Tank Self-Propelled Regiment (the former 78th Tank Brigade). It gained the 78th designation in 1965. It was part of the 1st Army Corps from 1960, and was based at Ayaguz from 1970. In 1991, on the fall of the Soviet Union, the 78th Tank Division was serving at Ayaguz, Kazakh SSR, in the Turkestan Military District. In March 1992 it became part of the Kazakh Ground Forces, and soon after became the 78th Mechanized Division.

In 1992 it became a mechanized division. In 2000, it received the honorific "Kabanbai Batyr". In 2003, the division disbanded due to the reorganization of the Kazakh Ground Forces into brigades. The 369th Guards Motor Rifle Regiment became the 3rd Separate Guards Mechanized Brigade. The 180th and 156th Tank Regiments became the 11th Kabanbai Batyr Tank Brigade. The 1030th Self-Propelled Artillery Regiment became the 34th Artillery Brigade.

== History ==
The 78th Tank Brigade began forming in accordance with a directive of the NKO dated 11 February 1942, in the city of Vladimir as part of the Moscow Military District. The brigade included the 263rd and 264th Tank Battalions and a technical support company. Major Aleksey Dmitrievich Loktionov became brigade commander. Lieutenant Colonel Leonid Chigin took command of the brigade on 3 March 1943 and commanded it until 30 April.

In the autumn of 1943, the 78th Tank Brigade took part in the Nevel Offensive. One Soviet report said the brigade only lost seven tanks in the offensive. For distinction in battles during this operation, by order of the Supreme Commander-in-Chief on September 7, 1943, the brigade was given the honorary name "Nevelskaya". On April 4, 1944, it was reassigned to the 10th Guards Army of the 2nd Baltic Front.

On February 10, 1945, it was withdrawn from the 10th Guards Army and subordinated to the 42nd Army of the 2nd Baltic Front.

=== Cold War ===
Between 1 and 2 November 1945 the 78th Separate Tank Brigade left the Baltic Military District, and entrained for the station of Osipovichi in the Belorussian Military District, where it became part of the 12th Mechanized Division and was reorganized as a tank regiment. In accordance with a directive dated 30 July 1949, the regiment handed over its T-54 tanks to units of the 12th Mechanized Division and received in exchange 65 T-34 tanks. From 15 July 1949 the regiment left the 12th Mechanized Division and entrained for Chardzhou, where it became part of the Turkestan Military District. By an order dated 11 August 1949 the regiment, with a strength of 811 men and 65 T-34 tanks was expanded to form the new 15th Tank Division. The 78th Tank Regiment itself formed the 143rd Tank Regiment (v/ch 01287) at Chardzhou, as well as the 156th and 167th Tank Regiments, the 180th Heavy Tank Self-Propelled Gun Regiment, 608th Anti-Aircraft Artillery Regiment, and 94th Guards Mortar Battalion (MLRS). Except for the 143rd Tank Regiment, the division was stationed at Kogon from 1949.

In accordance with a directive dated 12 March 1957, the 15th Tank Division was reorganized along a new table of organization and equipment. The division included the 143rd, 156th, and 180th Heavy Tank Regiments, the 608th Anti-Aircraft Artillery Regiment, 194th Separate Signals Battalion, 103rd Separate Sapper Battalion, 19th Separate Medical-Sanitary Company, 120th Separate Auto-Transport Company, 406th Armored Repair Workshop, 407th Auto-Transport Workshop, and 8th Separate Training Tank Battalion. On 5 August 1961 the 180th Heavy Tank Regiment was redesignated as the 180th Tank Regiment. The division relocated to Ashgabat in 1958.

In October 1960, the division became part of the 1st Army Corps. On 19 February 1962 the 345th Separate Missile Battalion and separate equipment maintenance and recovery battalion were activated.

On 11 January 1965, the division was redesignated as the 78th Tank Division, restoring its original World War II number. On 1 January 1968, it had a total strength of 7,404 men including 886 officers. In April 1970, the 374th Motor Rifle Regiment moved to the 155th Motor Rifle Division and was replaced by the 5th Guards Motor Rifle Division's 369th Guards Motor Rifle Regiment. At the same time the division transferred to Ayaguz in May 1970. In 1972, the chemical defense company became the 564th Separate Chemical Defense Battalion. The 1052nd Separate Material Supply Battalion was formed in 1980 from the motor transport battalion. On 24 September 1981, the division became part of the 32nd Army. In 1988, the division was equipped with T-62 tanks and BMP-1 infantry fighting vehicles. On 1 March 1988, it returned to control of the 1st Army Corps. On 4 June 1991 it became part of the reformed 40th Army. During the Cold War it was maintained at 65% strength.

=== Kazakh service ===
In March 1992, it was taken over by Kazakhstan. On 7 May 1992, it officially became part of the Kazakh Ground Forces. On 14 May 1999, the division was reorganized into the 3rd Mechanized Division. The full name of the division after the reorganization was the 3rd Mechanized Red Banner Nevelsk Division. At the same time, the 180th Tank Regiment was renamed to the 31st Tank Regiment. On 20 October 2000, it was named after Kabanbai Batyr. In connection with the transition of the Ground Forces to a brigade formation in 2003, the division was disbanded. On 15 May 2005, the 31st Tank Regiment was reorganized into the 11th Separate Mechanized Brigade. On 1 December 2007, the 11th Mechanized Brigade was reorganized into the 11th Tank Brigade.

== Commanders ==
- Major Aleksey Dmitrievich Loktionov, 7 January 1942 – 3 March 1943 (Lt. Col. from 20 February 1942)
- Lieutenant Colonel Leonid Chigin, 3 March–30 April 1943 (Col. from 22 February 1943)
- Major Yakov Grigoryevich Kochergin (1 May 1943 – 14 November 1944)
- Colonel Vasily Konstantinovich Borodavkin (14 November 1944 – 23 March 1945)
- Lt. Col. Vasily Firsovich Kirdyashev (23 March–17 May 1945; Col. from 10 April 1945)
- Col. Nikolay Mikhailovich Lebedev (17 May 1945 – 18 March 1946)
- Col. Nikolay Fyodorovich Bylinsky (18 March 1946 – 8 March 1948)
- Col. Nikolay Denisovich Morachevich (8 March 1948 – 26 August 1949)
- Major-general Anatoly Vasilyevich Kvashnin (1982 - 1987)
