= Vladimir Zheleznikov =

Russian children's writer (1925–2015)

- Владимир Железников
- Born: 26 October 1925; Vitebsk, USSR
- Died: 3 December 2015 (aged 90); Moscow, Russia
- Education: Gorky Literary Institute
- Occupations: Writer, screenwriter, playwright
- Writing career
- Language: Russian
- Period: 1957—2015
- Genre: Children's literature

Vladimir Karpovich Zheleznikov (Russian: Владимир Карпович Железников; October 26, 1925, Vitebsk – December 3, 2015, Moscow) was a Soviet and Russian children's writer and screenwriter. He was a laureate of the USSR State Prize (1974, 1986) and a Honored art worker of the Russian Federation (1995).

== Biography ==
Vladimir Zheleznikov was born into the family of a border guard officer, Karp Zheleznikov, and Yevgenia Vasilyevna Zheleznikovа (1900–1979), a teacher of Russian language and literature. According to Vladimir Zheleznikov himself, "just before the war, when I was fifteen, I wrote a short novella. I did not choose a professional writing career right away. During the war years, I studied at a special school of the Air Force and at an artillery school. After the war, I came to Moscow and graduated from the law institute here. In parallel, I pursued my writing endeavors". In 1957, he graduated from the Gorky Literary Institute.

He worked at the magazine Murzilka. He considered writer Vitaly Bianki and artist Vladimir Lebedev his mentors.

Zheleznikov died at the age of 90 on December 3, 2015. He is buried at the Troyekurovskoye Cemetery.

== Work ==
Vladimir Zheleznikov's books have been translated into many languages of the world; they focus on relationships between people, the problems of growing up, childhood, and adolescence. They have become classics of domestic children's literature and are included in the school curriculum. The writer was the ability to convey the acuity and drama of a child's worldview, when an event trivial to adults could grow in a child's eyes to the scale of a tragedy.

His first book, The Multicolored Story, was published in 1960.

The story "The Cosmonaut" represented the USSR (alongside stories by Rady Pogodin, Oles Donchenko, Makvala Mrevlishvili, Jaan Rannap, and Hakim Nazir) in the collection of stories by writers from different countries Children of the World (1962), prepared by an international editorial board (published in the USSR in 1965).

As a screenwriter, he debuted in 1970 with the film Silver Trumpets.

From 1988, Zheleznikov served as the artistic director of the Globus film studio, which produces films for children.

== Family ==
His daughter is Tatyana Vladimirovna Zheleznikovа (born 1945), a pianist who has been a repetiteur at the Moscow Conservatory since 1968.

His wife (second marriage) was Galina Alekseevna Arbuzova (born 1935), daughter of playwright Aleksei Arbuzov and stepdaughter of Konstantin Paustovsky. She graduated from the Gorky Literary Institute (seminar in literary criticism) and co-authored screenplays.

== Memories ==
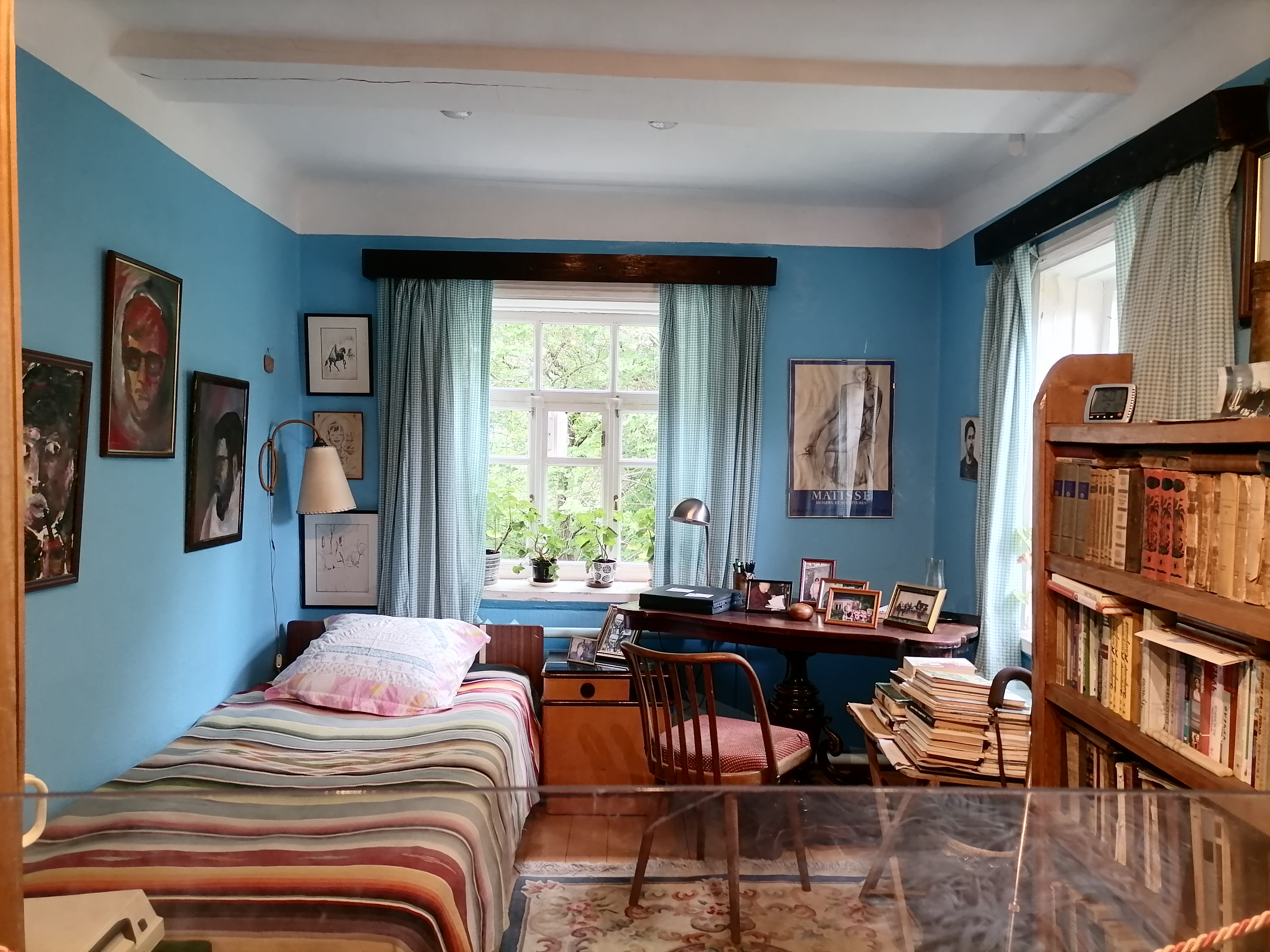
Zheleznikov's office in Tarusa

A memorial study dedicated to Zheleznikov has been set up in the Paustovsky house-museum in Tarusa.
