= 1st Army Corps (Soviet Union) =

The 1st Army Corps was an army corps of the Soviet Armed Forces. It was formed in 1957 and finally deactivated in 1991. It draws its history from the 1st Rifle Corps, formed in 1922. Troops of the 1st Rifle Corps participated in the Winter War (November 1939 - March 1940) and World War II.

== First Formation ==
The corps was formed in June, 1922 in Petrograd (currently Saint-Petersburg) as the 1st Army Corps (1 ak). Creation of the corps was based on a Directive of the Commander number 195060/69, of 15 May 1922, Order Petrograd VO No.1416/383, 6 June 1922. In July 1922 it was named the 1st Rifle Corps. In 1926 corps headquarters was moved to Novgorod, and in 1938 to Pskov.

On May 15, 1939, the 75th Rifle Division (75th RD) was transferred from the 14th Rifle Corps (Kharkov Military District) and arrived in the Leningrad Military District. In September 1939, the 75th Rifle Division concentrated in the 1st Rifle Corps 8th Army on the border with Estonia.

In November 1939 the 75th Rifle Division arrived in Schlusselburg (LenVO) where on vehicles it was transferred to Karelia, as part of the 1st Rifle Corps, 8th Army, LenVO. That same month corps headquarters was moved to Petrozavodsk (November 1939 - April 1940).

Corps Headquarters was located at:

- Pskov (April - June 1940);
- Tartu (June - July 1940);
- Białystok ( from July 1940).

The corps was a part of the:

- Petrograd Military District (1922-1924);
- Leningrad Military District (1924-1939);
- 8th Army Leningrad Military District (November 1939 - July 1940 );
- 10th Army Western Special Military District (July 1940).

The corps participated in the Soviet-Finnish War (1939-1940) (November 1939 - March 1940).

On June 22, 1941, at the beginning of Operation Barbarossa, the corps comprised the:

- Corps Headquarters (Bialystok) (Shtat (Table of Organisation and Equipment) 4/1)
- 2nd Rifle Division (Osovets)
- 8th Rifle Division (Stavisky)
- 130th Corps Artillery Regiment (Łomża)
- 262nd Corps Artillery Regiment
- 23rd Separate Communications Battalion

General Major F.D. Rubtsov was the corps commander.

Last mention in the Boevoi sostav Sovetskoi armii (Combat composition of the Soviet Army, BSSA) was on 1 July 1941 with the corps directly subordinated to the Western Front (Soviet Union).

== Second formation ==
The corps reappeared in BSSA on 1 June 1942 directly subordinated to the North Caucasian Front, and made up of four rifle brigades. Thereafter, the last 1942 BSSA mention of the corps is on 1 August 1942.

== Third formation and Cold War ==
The 1st Rifle Corps reappears in the BSSA on 1 September 1943 as part of the Northwestern Front. Final mention on 1 May 1945 subordinated to the 1st Shock Army, Leningrad Front, and in command of the 306th, 344th, and 357th Rifle Divisions. The corps headquarters, as well as the 4th Shock Army, was moved to Central Asia after the end of the war and established at Ashgabat. On 25 June 1957 it was renamed the 1st Army Corps. In April 1970, the corps headquarters was moved to Semipalatinsk, and 78th Tank Division moved it headquarters from Ashkabad (Turkmen SSR) to Ayaguz (Kazakh SSR) at the same time. In September 1981 it was raised in status to become 32nd Army.

32nd Army was redesignated 1st Army Corps once again on 1 March 1988, but on 4 June 1991 the headquarters was again renamed to become 40th Army.

== Commanders ==
- Vasily Blyukher (1922-1924)
- Mikhail Sangursky (August 1924 -May 1926)
- Vitaly Primakov (May 1926 – 1927)
- Mikhail Kalmykov (July 1927)
- Eduard Lepin (July 1930)
- Yakov Sheko (September 1930 - July 1931)
- Leonty Ugryumov (July 1931 -February 1935)
- Vladimir Kurdyumov (May 1935 - March 1937),
- Mikhail Khozin (March 1937-July 1937),
- Vasily Malofeev (August 1937-August 1938)
- Valerian A. Frolov (January -October 1939)
- Roman Ivanovich Panin (October 21, 1939 -December 29, 1939),
- Dmitry Timofeyevich Kozlov (December 1939 -April 1940)
- Fyodor Dmitrijevich Rubtsov (April 27, 1940 -July 6, 1941)
- Vasily Kotelnikov (September 3, 1943 - May 27, 1944)
- Nikolai Vasilyev (May 28, 1944 - July 1945)
