= Battle of Velikiye Luki =

1942 battle

- Part of the Eastern Front of World War II
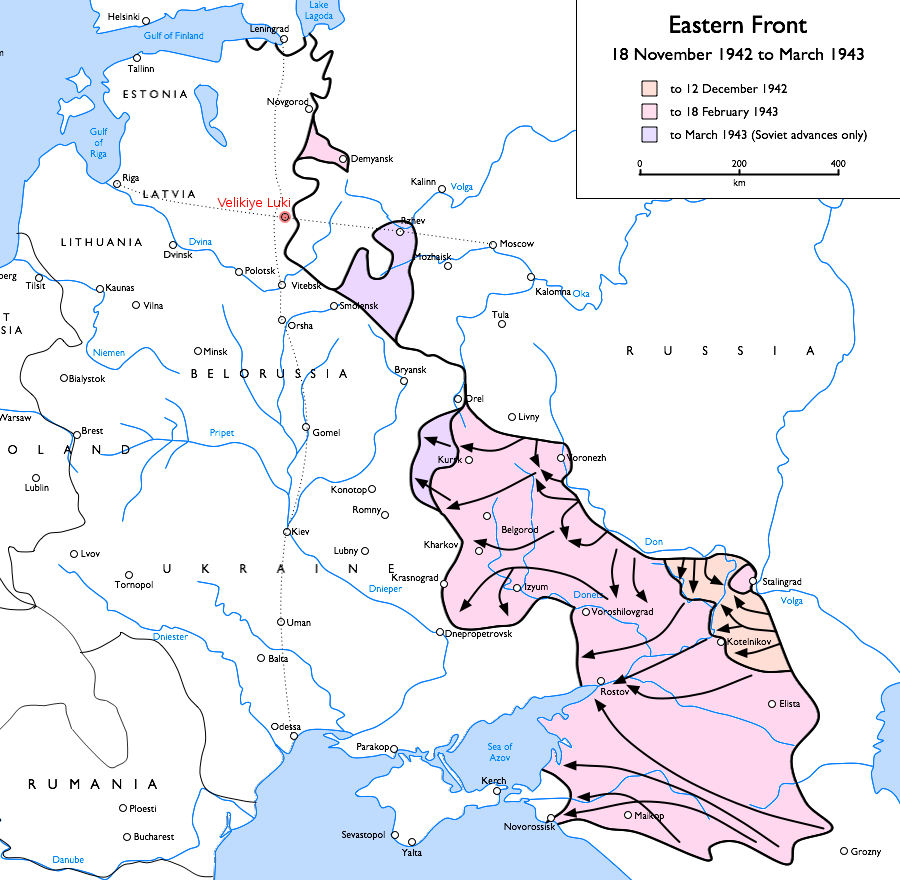
- Velikiye Luki (red, upper left) and the nearby rail trunks, in the context of the Soviet 1942–1943 offensives. (click to enlarge)
Date	19 November 1942 – 16 January 1943
Location	Velikiye Luki, Russian SFSR, Soviet Union
Result	Soviet victory

Belligerents
Germany	Soviet Union

Commanders and leaders
(Nazi Germany) Kurt von der Chevallerie	(Soviet Union) Maksim Purkayev (Soviet Union) Kuzma Galitsky

Strength
LIX Korps – ~50,000 (on 19 Nov); Reinforcement forces: ~50,000	3rd Shock Army – 95,608 (on 19 Nov); Reinforcement forces: 86,700

Casualties and losses
Western estimate: 5,000 KIA and MIA; 15,000 WIA; Soviet estimate: ~60,000 killed, missing or wounded, 4,500 captured	104,022; 31,674 killed or missing 72,348 wounded

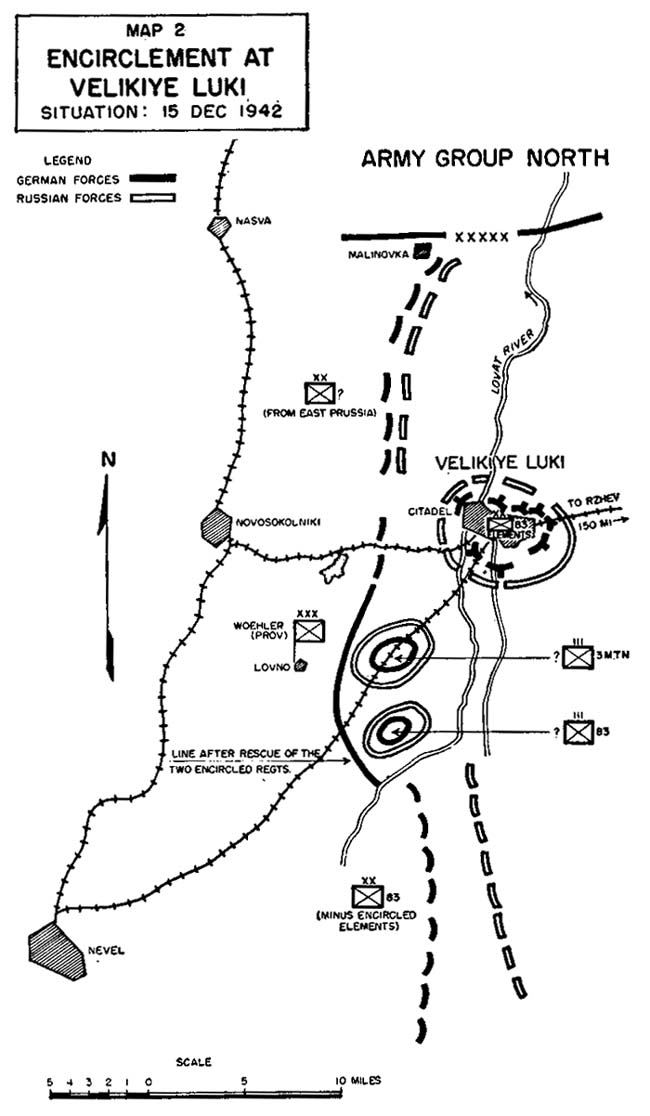
Situation after the initial Soviet advance.

The Battle of Velikiye Luki, also named Velikiye Luki offensive operation (Russian: Великолукская наступательная операция), started with the attack by the forces of the Kalinin Front against the 3rd Panzer Army during the winter campaign of 1942–1943 with the objective of liberating the Russian city of Velikiye Luki as a previous part of the northern pincer of the Rzhev-Sychevka Strategic Offensive Operation (Operation Mars).

Sometimes known as "The Little Stalingrad of the North", the Soviet forces encircled the city on 27 November 1942 but were unable to make much progress against German units further west nor retake a key railway to Leningrad. The German garrison in the city was ordered to hold out for a relief force. As was the case at Stalingrad, German counter-attacks were unable to reach the city and the garrison surrendered on 16 January 1943.

== Background ==
As part of Operation Barbarossa, the German army took Velikiye Luki on 19 July 1941 but was forced to retreat the next day due to Soviet counter-attacks breaking the line of communications. A new attack was launched in late August, and the city was recaptured on 26 Aug.

The city had great strategic value due to the main north–south railway line running just west of the city at Novosokolniki, as well as the city's own rail network to Vitebsk and bridges over the Lovat River. After its capture and with the German offensive running out of steam for the winter, the area was fortified. Marshy terrain extended to Lake Peipus from just north of the city defended by the 16th Army, making operations in the region around the city difficult for both sides. Rather than maintaining a solid "front" in the area, the Germans established a series of thinly held outposts to the north and south of the city.

Soviet counter-attacks during the Winter Campaign of 1941–1942, especially the Battles of Rzhev just to the south, formed a large salient in the German lines. Velikiye Luki lay just on the western edge of the original advance and was as important for the Soviets as the Germans. The city dominated the region and would therefore be the natural point for fighting, offering the possibility of eliminating the German bridges on the Lovat, and to deny the Germans use of the rail line that provided communications between Army groups North and Centre. As long as the German Army occupied both rail junctions at Velikiye Luki and Rzhev, the Red Army could not reliably reinforce or supply its troops on the north face of the massive Rzhev Salient. Because of its strategic significance, the Germans fortified the city over the course of 1942. The Soviets often raided German-held territory around the town and the town could only be kept supplied by armoured trains.

== Soviet offensive ==
The Soviet offensive to retake the city was developed in mid-November 1942 using troops from the 3rd and 4th Shock armies and 3rd Air Army. The city was defended by the 83rd Infantry Division (Lieutenant General Theodor Scherer) the lines to the south held by the 3rd Mountain Division and the front to the north held by the 5th Mountain Division. The city was provided with extensively prepared defenses and garrisoned by a regiment of the 83rd Division, a total of about 7,000 troops.

=== Encirclement of German forces ===
Rather than attacking the town directly, the Soviet forces advanced into the difficult terrain to the north and south of the town. Spearheaded by the 9th and 46th Guards and 357th Rifle Divisions of 5th Guards Rifle Corps to the south and the 381st Rifle Division to the north, the operation commenced on 24 November. Despite heavy losses, they successfully cut the land links to the city by 27 November, trapping the garrison; by the next day they threatened to cut off other elements of the corps south of the city when the front commander released his 2nd Mechanised Corps into the breach created between the 3rd Mountain and 83rd Infantry Divisions. Army Group Centre's commander asked the OKH for permission to conduct a breakout operation while the situation was still relatively fluid by pulling the German lines back by around ten miles (16 km). The request was dismissed by Hitler, who, pointing to an earlier success in a similar situation at Kholm, demanded that the encircled formations stand fast while the Gruppe "Chevallerie" from the north and 20th Motorised Division from the south counter-attacked to open the encirclement.

=== German relief attempts ===
The garrison were ordered to hold the city at all costs, while a relief force was assembled. The remainder of the 83rd Infantry and 3rd Mountain Divisions, encircled south of Velikiye Luki, fought their way west to meet the relieving troops. Due to Army Group Centre's commitments at Rzhev, the only resources immediately available to man the lines opposite Velikiye Luki were those already in the area, which were organised as Gruppe Wöhler (291st Infantry Division). Later, other divisions were made available, including the understrength 8th Panzer Division from Gruppe Chevallerie, the 20th Motorized Infantry Division from Army Group Centre reserve, and the weak 6th Luftwaffe Field Division, and the hurriedly rushed to the front 707th and 708th Security, and 205th and 331st Infantry divisions although there was a corresponding build-up of Soviet strength.

Throughout December, the garrison – which maintained radio contact with the relief forces – held out against repeated Soviet attempts to reduce their lines, and in particular the rail depot in the city's southern suburb. The Soviet forces, attacking strongly entrenched troops in severe winter weather, suffered extremely high casualties, while conditions in the city steadily deteriorated despite airdrops of supplies, ammunition and equipment. In the meantime, Soviet attempts to take their main objective, the rail lines at Novosokolniki, had been frustrated by the counter-attacks of the relief force. An attempt by the Germans to reach Velikiye Luki in late December ran into stubborn Soviet defence and halted, heavily damaged.

Operation Totila, the next attempt to break through to Velikiye Luki, was launched on 4 January. The two German spearheads advanced to within five miles (8.0 km) of the city, but stalled due to pressure on their flanks. On 5 January, a Soviet attack from the north split Velikiye Luki in two, isolating a small group of troops in the fortified "citadel" in the west of the city, while the bulk of the garrison retained a sector centred around the rail station in the south of the city. The former group broke out on during the night of the 14th; around 150 men eventually reached German lines. The German garrison surrendered on 16 January.

== Aftermath ==
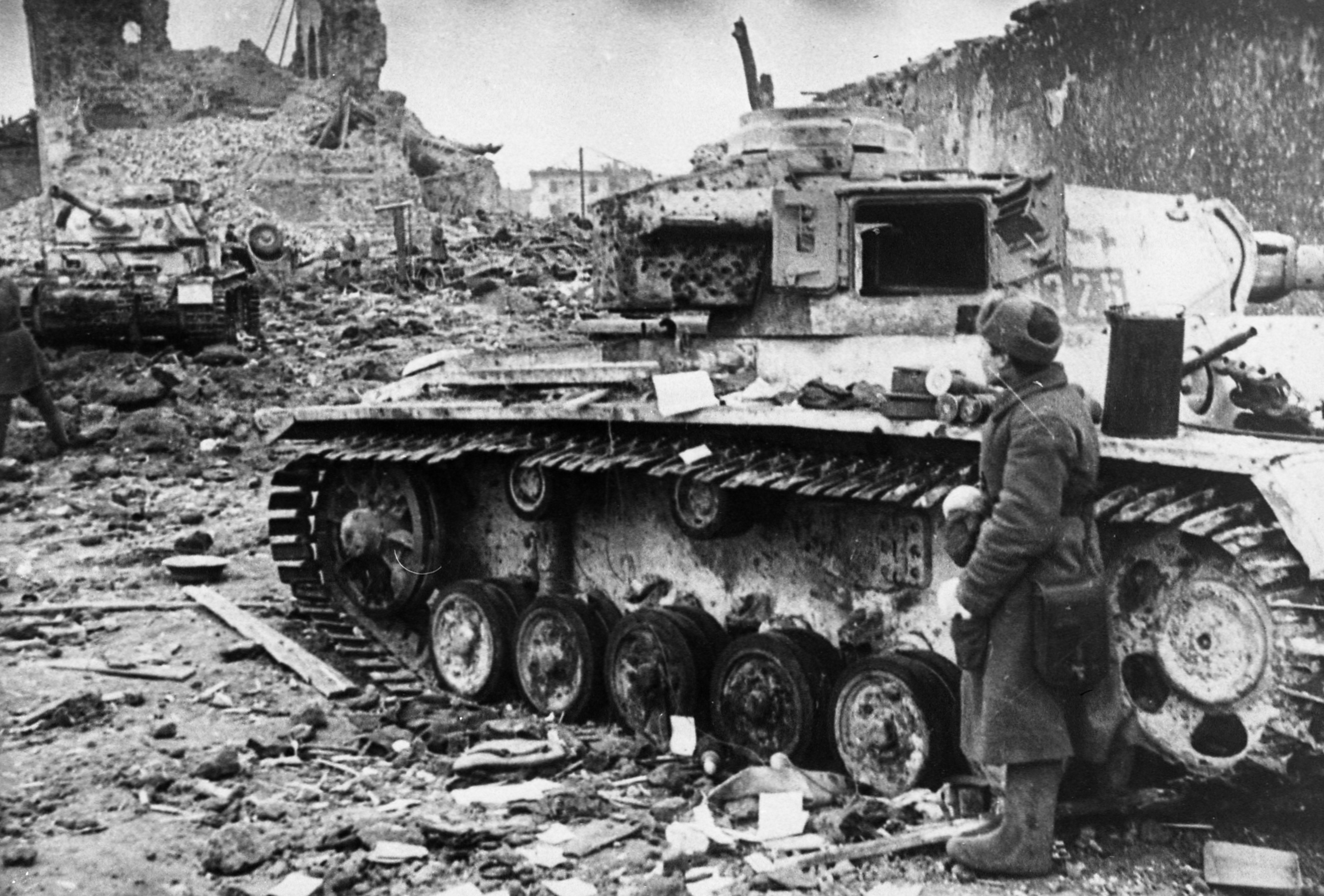
Soviet soldiers examine destroyed German Panzer III and IV tanks in the ruins of Velikiye Luki

After the war, the Soviet authorities collected a representative set of Germans of various ranks from general to private who had fought at Velikiye Luki from prisoner-of-war camps and brought them to the city. A military tribunal held a public trial and convicted them for war crimes related to anti-partisan warfare. Nine were sentenced to death, including the two regimental commanders in the Battle Fritz-Georg von Rappard and Eduard von Saß, and publicly hanged in the main square of Velikiye Luki in January 1946.

The battle is sometimes called "The Little Stalingrad of the North" due to its similarities with the Battle of Stalingrad in the south. The battle was a small affair by the standards of the Eastern Front (150,000 total casualties suffered by both sides; 2,000,000 total casualties at Stalingrad) but had enormous strategic consequences. The liberation of Velikiye Luki meant the Red Army had, for the first time since October 1941, a direct rail supply line to the northern face of the Rzhev Salient, exposing the German troops at Rzhev to encirclement. The defeat at Velikiye Luki forced a withdrawal from the salient, ending any German military threat to Moscow.

Even after withdrawing from Rzhev, possession of Velikiye Luki meant that the rail link between Army groups North and Centre was severed, preventing the German Army from shifting reinforcements between threatened sectors. The rail lines from Velikiye Luki led directly into the rear of Vitebsk, a supply hub for Army Group Centre. Army Group Centre was exposed to attack from the north, east, and (after the Battle of Smolensk) south, exposing the army group to encirclement, which happened in Operation Bagration the following year.

== Orders of battle ==
While it is somewhat difficult to separate the actions of various Red Army and Wehrmacht units within the flurry of movements involved in the larger scope of the Soviet operations, for the most part these below are derived from Glantz and Isayev.

=== Soviet ===
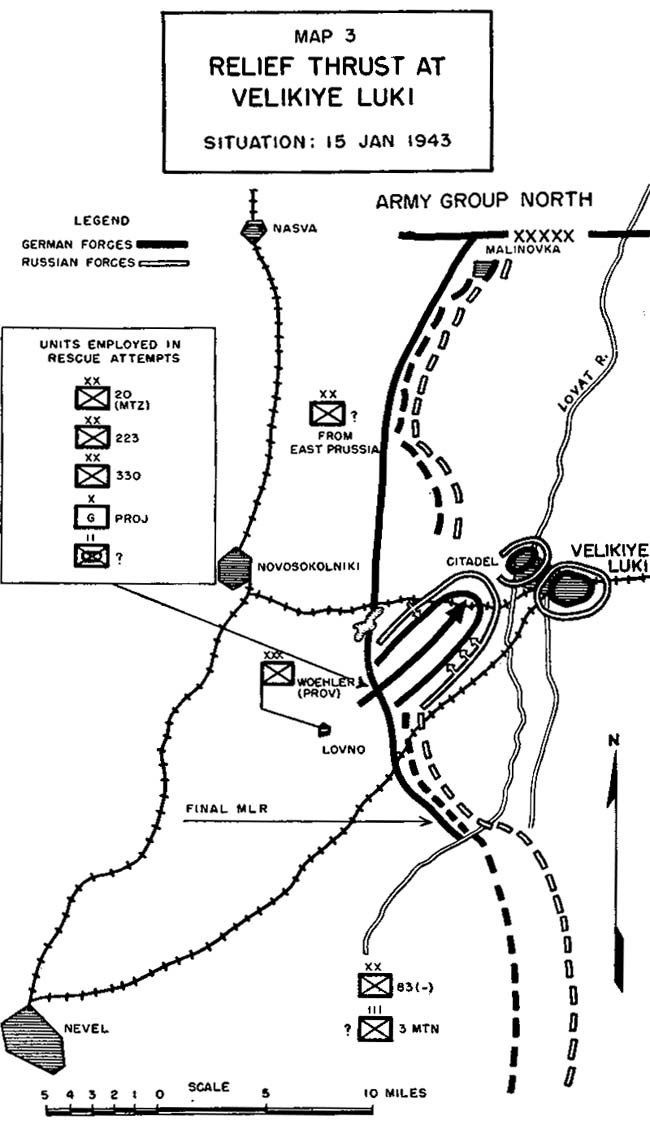
German relief attempts. (Notice that the order of battle given on this 1952 map is not accurate.)

- Kalinin Front (Maksim Alekseyevich Purkayev) engaged in the Second Rzhev-Sychevka Offensive to the south of Velikiye Luki.
- 4th Shock Army
- 3rd Shock Army as of 1 December 1942 (General Lieutenant Kuzma Galitsky)
  - 2nd Guards Rifle Corps (held a defensive front during the battle)
  - 5th Guards Rifle Corps (Major General A. P. Beloborodov)
    - 9th Guards Rifle Division (Major General I. V. Prostyakov)
    - 46th Guards Rifle Division (Major General S. I. Karapetyan)
    - 357th Rifle Division (Colonel A. L. Kronik)
  - Separate Rifle Divisions:
    - 21st Guards Rifle Division (Major General D. V. Mikhaylov)
    - 28th Rifle Division (Colonel S. A. Knyazkov)
    - 33rd Rifle Division (Major General F. A. Zuyev)
    - 117th Rifle Division (Colonel E. G. Koberidze)
    - 257th Rifle Division (Colonel A. A. Dyakonov)
    - 381st Rifle Division (Colonel B. S. Maslov)
  - Separate Rifle Brigades:
    - 31st Rifle Brigade
    - 54th Rifle Brigade
  - 44th Ski Brigade
  - 2nd Mechanized Corps (Major General Ivan Korchagin)
    - 18th Mechanized Brigade
    - 34th Mechanized Brigade
    - 43rd Mechanized Brigade
    - 33rd Tank Brigade
    - 36th Tank Brigade
    - 68th Separate Motorcycle Battalion
  - 184th Tank Brigade
  - 27th Separate Tank Regiment
  - 34th Separate Tank Regiment (Lieutenant Colonel Bogdanov) equipped with T-34 tanks
  - 37th Separate Tank Regiment
  - 38th Separate Tank Regiment (Lieutenant Colonel Zheleznov, after 30.12.42 Lieutenant Colonel Khubayev) equipped with T-34 tanks
  - 45th Separate Tank Regiment
  - 146th, 170th Separate Tank Battalions
  - 225th, 289th, 293rd Separate Engineer Brigades
  - 94th Motor-Pontoon Battalion
- 3rd Air Army
- Long Range Aviation
  - 3rd Long-range aviation division (Colonel Yukhanov)
  - 17th Long-range aviation division (General Major of Aviation Loginov)
  - 222nd Long-range aviation division (Colonel Titov)

=== German ===
- Army Group Center
  - Group "Chevallerie" from (LIX Corps)
    - Wehrmacht's Velikiye Luki garrison
    - Gruppe "Wöhler"
      - 83rd Infantry Division (Lieutenant-General Theodor Scherer)
- Operation "Totila" relief forces
  - II/11th Panzer Division
    - Two battalions/331st Infantry Division
  - 8th Panzer Division (14 PzKW 38t, and one command tank)
  - 20th Motorized Infantry Division
  - 6th Luftwaffe Field Division
  - 3rd Mountain Division (at Novosokol'niki to the rear of 83rd Infantry Division's positions)
  - 291st Infantry Division
  - 1 SS Infantry Brigade (mot)
  - Frikorps Danmark

Most of Army Group Center was engaged in resisting the second Soviet Rzhev-Sychevka offensive throughout this period.

Almost half of the 83rd Infantry Division was assigned to the Velikiye Luki garrison.

The 3rd Mountain Division was at little more than half strength, since its 139th Regiment had been left in Lapland when the division withdrew from northern Finland. The 138th Mountain Regiment was the unknown unit of 3rd Mountain shown in Maps 2 and 3.

20th Motorized was from Army Group Center's reserve.

== See also ==
- Eastern Front (World War II)
