= Zimnyatsky =

Zimnyatsky Зимняцкий
- Khutor
- Location within Volgograd Oblast Location within Russia
- Coordinates: 49°42′N 42°52′E
- Country: Russia
- Region: Volgograd Oblast
- District: Serafimovichsky District
- Time zone: UTC+4:00

Zimnyatsky (Russian: Зимняцкий) is a rural locality (a khutor) and the administrative center of Zimnyatskoye Rural Settlement, Serafimovichsky District, Volgograd Oblast, Russia. The population was 1,834 as of 2010. There are 25 streets.

== Geography ==
Zimnyatsky is located in steppe, 22 km northeast of Serafimovich (the district's administrative centre) by road. Grushin is the nearest rural locality.
