= 22nd Motor Rifle Division "Atamyrat Niyazov" =

22nd Motor Rifle Division (After 2010) 58th Motor Rifle Division (1957–1990s) 58th Rifle Division (1955–57) 344th Rifle Division (1941–55)
- Active: 1941–1990s Since June 1992
- Country: Soviet Union; Turkmenistan
- Branch: Red Army (1941-1946); Soviet Army (1946-1991); Turkmen Ground Forces (1991-present)
- Type: Division
- Role: Motor rifle
- Garrison/HQ: Serdar
- Decorations: Order of the Red Banner
- Battle honours: Roslavl

The 22nd Motor Rifle Division named for Atamyrat Niyazov (Military Unit Number 01123) is a division of the Turkmenistan Ground Forces. It traces its history to the 344th Rifle Division (Russian: 344-я стрелковая дивизия), an infantry division of the Red Army and the Soviet Ground Forces during World War II and the Cold War.

== History ==
=== World War II ===
The division was formed in the Baryshsky and Kuzovatovsky Districts of Ulyanovsk Oblast between August and October 1941 in accordance with an 11 August decree of the State Defense Committee. It was part of the operational army from 2 December of that year to the end of the war on 9 May 1945. Its basic order of battle was as follows:

- 1152nd Rifle Regiment
- 1154th Rifle Regiment
- 1156th Rifle Regiment
- 913th Artillery Regiment

In November 1941, in accordance with Direction number 55 of the Stavka and commander of the 26th Army Reserve op/2999 number from 25 November 1941, the division was loaded onto trains at Cheboksary and shipped to Noginsk, and then to Lyubertsy where it was manned and received weapons.

In December the 344th was assigned to the Moscow Defense Zone as part of the last-ditch defenses of the capital. It first went into combat in January 1942, in the 50th Army of Western Front. It remained in this Army until April 1943, when it was moved to the 49th Army in the same Front. It took part in Operation Suvorov under this command, and on 28 August made probing attacks against the German Gruppe Harpe to prevent the transfer of reserves; by three days later the division had suffered 2,000 casualties, about one-third of its strength. On 25 September it was awarded the battle honor Roslavl in recognition of its part in the liberation of that city. On 29 September the division recaptured Mstsislaw. In April 1944 it was again reassigned, this time to the 62nd Rifle Corps of 33rd Army in 2nd Belorussian Front, and fought under these headquarters during Operation Bagration. It was awarded the Order of the Red Banner on 10 July 1944, for its role in the forcing of the Pronya and Dniepr Rivers and the liberation of the cities of Mogilev, Shklov and Bykhov in the first phase of Operation Bagration. In August it went into the reserves of 1st Baltic Front, and from September 1944 until February 1945 it served in the 19th Rifle Corps of 43rd Army in that Front, along the coast of Lithuania. From at least October 1944, it had attached the 18th SU Battalion of SU-76s in addition to its organic battalion of towed anti-tank guns. During the last months of the war the 344th was part of the force containing the German forces trapped in the Courland Pocket, and it ended the war in the 1st Rifle Corps of the 1st Shock Army in the Kurland Group of Leningrad Front. On 5 April 1945, the 1154th Rifle Regiment was separately awarded the Red Banner for its role in the capture of Klaipėda (Memel).

==== Divisional commanders ====
The following officers commanded the division during World War II:

- Colonel Mikhail Pudofeyevich Glushkov (7 September 1941 – 24 February 1942)
- Colonel Pyotr Kirillovich Zhivalev (26 February 1942 – 21 February 1943)
- Colonel Mikhail Trofimovich Ilyin (28 February – 5 June 1943)
- Major General Mikhail Andreyevich Pronin (8 June 1943 – 5 August 1943)
- Colonel Vitaly Kuzmich Strakhov (6 August 1943 – 12 April 1944)
- Colonel (promoted to Major General 20 April 1945) Georgy Ivanovich Druzhinin (13 April 1944 – after 9 May 1945)

=== Postwar ===
During September and October 1945, the 344th was relocated to Kushka in the Turkestan Military District with the 1st Shock Army's 1st Rifle Corps. The division was later moved to Kyzyl-Arvat. In April 1955, it was renumbered as the 58th Rifle Division. On 25 June 1957, it became the 58th Motor Rifle Division, and around the same time the 1st Rifle Corps became the 1st Army Corps. The division was directly subordinated to the district in 1970 when the corps transferred to Kazakhstan. Michael Holm's research indicates the division comprised the 160th Motor Rifle Regiment (73806) – Kazandzhike (BMP-1), the 161st Motor Rifle Regiment (73884) – Kyzyl-Arvat (BTR-60), the 162nd Motor Rifle Regiment (14142) – Nebit-Dag (trucks), and the 231st Tank Regiment (61631) – Kazandzhike (T-55), plus artillery and the other customary units of a motor rifle division. At the time, it carried the Military Unit Number 29435. In the spring of 1982, the division became part of the new 36th Army Corps. Carey Schofield's Inside the Soviet Army, Headline, 1991, p. 117, says the division's regiments in 1989 were 254 strong (MRR BTR), 256 strong (MRR BMP) and 210 (tank regiment), and was under the command of Acting Commander Colonel Mishin.

=== Fall of the Soviet Union ===
In June 1992 the division became part of the Armed Forces of Turkmenistan. By the early 2000s the 58th had become the 22nd Motor Rifle Division "Atamyrat Niyazov," and Kyzyl-Arvat had been renamed Serdar. It has also been believed to have been referred to as the 84th Motorized Rifle Division named after Saparmurat Niyazov. From 1997 to 2002, Begench Beknazarov served as deputy division commander, a position he would serve in until he was sent into hiding following the November 2002 attack on the president's life.

== Present day ==
It is named after Atamyrat Niyazov, the father of former President Saparmurat Niyazov, in July 2004. In May 2005, it took part in the comprehensive military exercises called Kuwwatly Watan (Strong Motherland) at the Kelyata Training Center. On 21 August 2008, Turkmen President Gurbanguly Berdimuhamedov visited the unit, where he inspected its equipment, including infantry fighting vehicles and armoured personnel carriers. He also presented the division with 20 Kamaz trucks and took part in the underwater exercises of tank crews. Like many military units, it has often been accepted that commanders extort bribes for an early demobilization of conscripts.

In June 2017, officers from the division were accused of spreading "non-traditional Islam". The accusation was based on an investigation at the end of April of that year by the Ministry for National Security, as a result of which 12 senior and junior officers were sentenced to terms of 10 to 15 years in prison. The investigation stemmed from a complaint by a recruit who was forced to take off the aladja (Turkmen amulet) by senior soldiers of the unit, who also warned that he was obliged to go to evening meetings where the company commander would talks about "true Islam". In the course of the investigation, more than 70 people were detained, with many of the rank and file being sent to serve on the Afghanistan–Turkmenistan border.
