= Molotitsy =

Molotitsy Молотицы
- Selo
- Location within Vladimir Oblast Location within Russia
- Coordinates: 55°45′N 41°57′E
- Country: Russia
- Region: Vladimir Oblast
- District: Muromsky District
- Time zone: UTC+3:00

Molotitsy (Russian: Молотицы) is a rural locality (a selo) in Borisoglebskoye Rural Settlement, Muromsky District, Vladimir Oblast, Russia. The population was 1,192 as of 2010. There are 18 streets.

== Geography ==
Molotitsy is located on the Ushna River, 23 km north of Murom (the district's administrative centre) by road. Varezh is the nearest rural locality.
