= Gusevo, Oryol Oblast =

- Location of Gusevo, Oryol Oblast
- Location of Gusevo, Oryol Oblast
- Coordinates: 53°0′26″N 36°33′7″E
- Country: Russia
- Federal subject: Oryol Oblast
- Elevation: 242 m (794 ft)
- Time zone: UTC+3 (MSK)
- Postal code(s): 303541
- OKTMO ID: 54618402121

Gusevo (Russian: Гусево) is a village in Zalegoshchensky District, Oryol Oblast, under the administration of the Bortnovskoye Rural Settlement. It had a population of 3 according to the 2010 Census.
