= Minsk Military Commandant's Service =

Belarusian military unit

- Минская военная комендатура
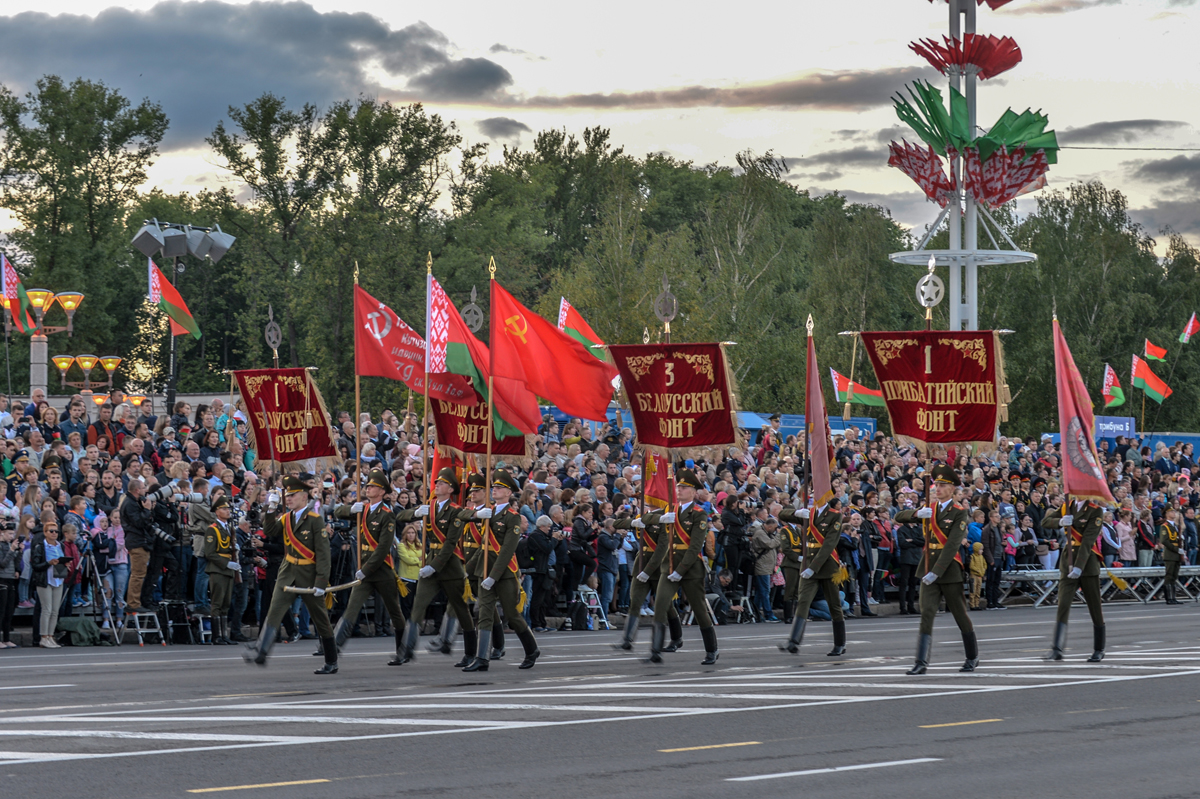
- Commandant's servicemen during the Minsk Independence Day Parade.
- Founded: November 30, 1917 – Present
- Country: Belarus
- Branch: Ministry of Defence
- Type: Military district
- Headquarters: Minsk

Commanders
- Current commander: Lieutenant Colonel Dmitry Zhukovsky
- Notable commanders: Colonel Nikolai Kurash

The Minsk Military Commandant's Service (Russian: Минская военная комендатура) is a regional formation of the Armed Forces of Belarus, based in the capital city of Minsk. It serves the territory of the Minsk Oblast and is one of 6 Military Commandant's Services in the Belarusian Armed Forces. Units under the command of commandants include military police, honour guards and military bands. It also solves a wide variety of tasks, including combat ones. The Commandant's Service is located in the military townlet of Uruchye on 20 Rogachevskaya Street. Previously, it was stationed at 4 Freedom Square.

== History ==
The Minsk Military Commandant's Service traces its history to November 30, 1917, when by order of the commander-in-chief of the Western Front, Alexander Miasnikian, a military Commandant's Service of Minsk was created. After the liberation of Minsk by the Red Army on 3 July 1944 in the Minsk offensive, by the directive of the headquarters of the 3rd Belorussian Front, the service of the Military Commandant of the City of Minsk was formed. In 1984, the administration became known as the Military Commandant's Service of the Minsk Garrison. In August 1995, it was reorganized into the Main Military Commandant's Service of the Armed Forces of the Republic of Belarus, and in 2007, it was reverted to the Minsk Military Commandant's Service.

== Structure ==
The Military Commandant's Service includes:

- Honor Guard Company
- Patrol Company
- Guard Service Company
- Band of the Honor Guard Company
- Military Traffic Police
- Department of Inquiry and Search for Servicemen
- Guardhouse

=== Special Units ===
==== Honor Guard ====
A special unit is a company of the guard of honor. Servicemen ensure the implementation of events such as the welcoming of heads of state and government delegations visiting the Republic of Belarus, as well as participate in national events and celebrations. The scope of the company's tasks also includes participation in the laying of wreaths at monuments and paying military honors at the burial of soldiers.

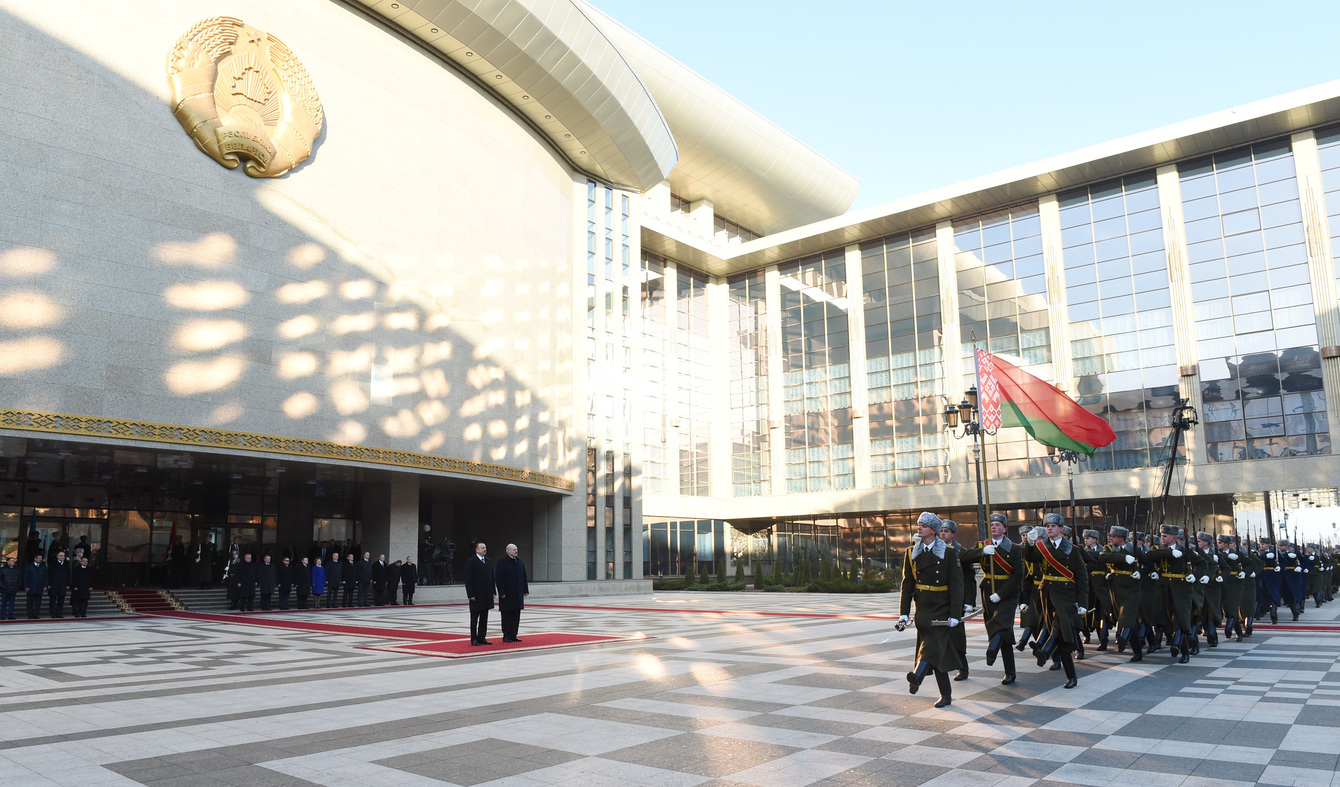
The honor guards at the Palace of Independence.

==== Unit Band ====
The Band of the Honor Guard Company of the Minsk Military Commandant was founded on 1 July 1995, as the Military Band of the Main Military Commandant's Service of the Armed Forces of the Republic of Belarus. Since 2018, the band has used chromatic fanfare trumpets in its ranks. For 21 years until 2016, the commander of the band was Sergey Kostiuchenko. It works alongside the honor guard in taking part state visits and other ceremonies in Belarus. The band is under the Military Band Service of the Armed Forces. The following have served as directors of the Band of the Honor Guard:

- Lieutenant Colonel Igor Khelbus (1993–1995)
- Lieutenant Colonel Sergey Kostiuchenko (1995–2005)
- Major Aleksandr Kantsyal (2016–2019)
- Captain Ilya Kupreev (2019– Present)

The company and the band commonly work together on joint visits to different countries.
