= List of Victory Day Parades in Minsk =

Celebration of the jubilee anniversary of the Great Patriotic War in Belarus

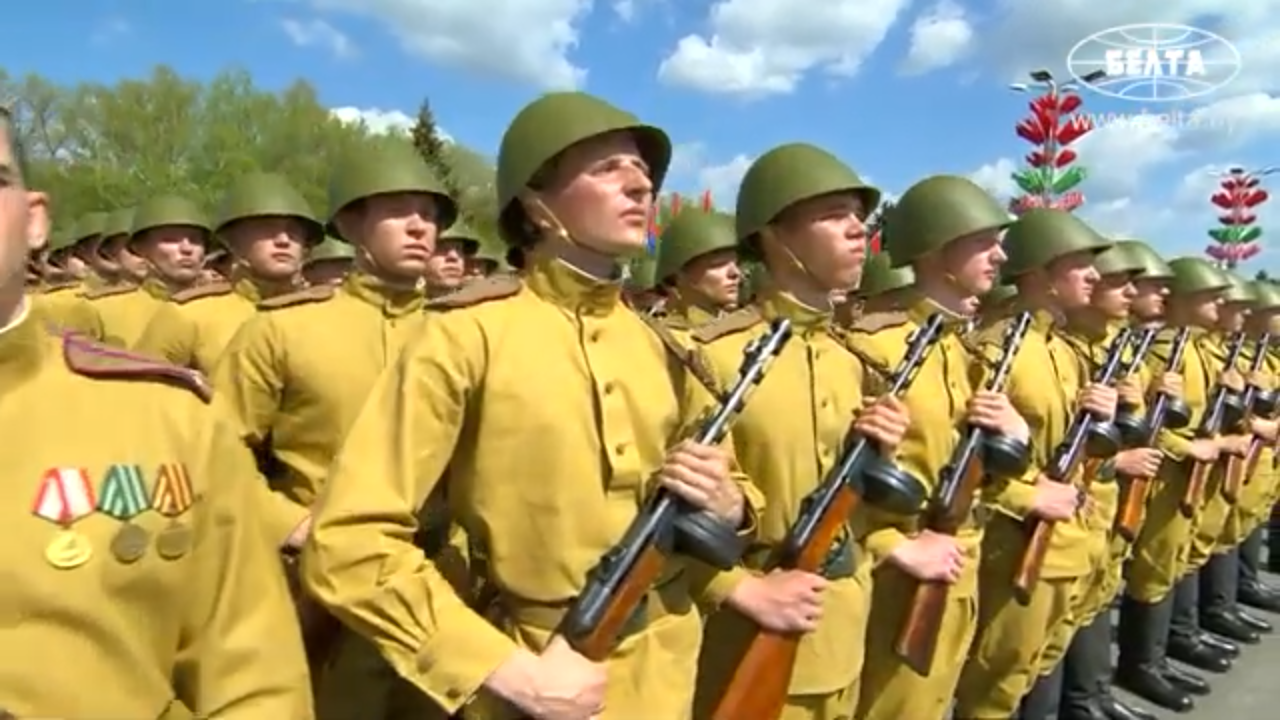
Cadets dressed in historical uniforms during the parade.

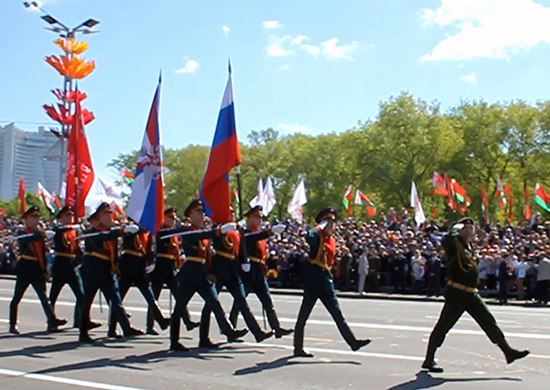
Troops of the 234th Guards Airborne Regiment of the Russian Airborne Troops.

The annual Victory Day Parade (Belarusian: Парад Перамогі; Russian: Парад Победы) on Victors Avenue in Minsk (the capital of Belarus) is a traditional military parade of the Armed Forces of Belarus that takes place every 5 years on 9 May in honor of the jubilee anniversary of the end of the Second World War (known as the Great Patriotic War in Belarus). The parade is held in the same style of other Russian Victory Day Parades.

== Parades prior to 1991 ==
The first parade in the Belarusian SSR occurred in 1965, on the occasion of the 20th anniversary. It was held on Central Square. It was presided by the commander of the Minsk Military District (then Colonel General S. S. Maryakhin). The parade saw troops of the Minsk Higher Engineering Radio Engineering School, infantrymen, artillerymen, pilots and tankers of the Minsk garrison pass the square. In attendance was First Secretary Pyotr Masherov. Self-propelled launchers based on ZIL-135 tractors with FKR-2 cruise missiles on board drive past the trade union palace. The final Soviet parade in Minsk was held in 1990 in concert with the 1990 Moscow Victory Day Parade.

== 1995 parade ==
It was the first military parade to be held in post-Soviet Belarus, being the first one to be held on Independence Square as well. The parade was inspected by Defence Minister Anatoly Kostenko. 24 units of the Minsk Garrison as well as over 100 pieces of military equipment took part in the march past.

== 2000 parade ==
The 2000 parade celebrated the 55th anniversary of the war's end. It was the second and last Victory Day parade to be held on Independence Square. Military vehicles such as the BMP and S-300 systems drove through Independence Square. After the procession of vehicles, a squadron of 30 aircraft flew over Minsk. Among the aircraft that participated were the Su-24, the MiG-29, the Su-27, the Su-25 and the IL-76. Leading Belarusian civilian enterprises demonstrated their technologies and products. One of the parade floats included a Brest carpet with the image of Marshal of the Soviet Union Georgy Zhukov.

== 2005 parade ==
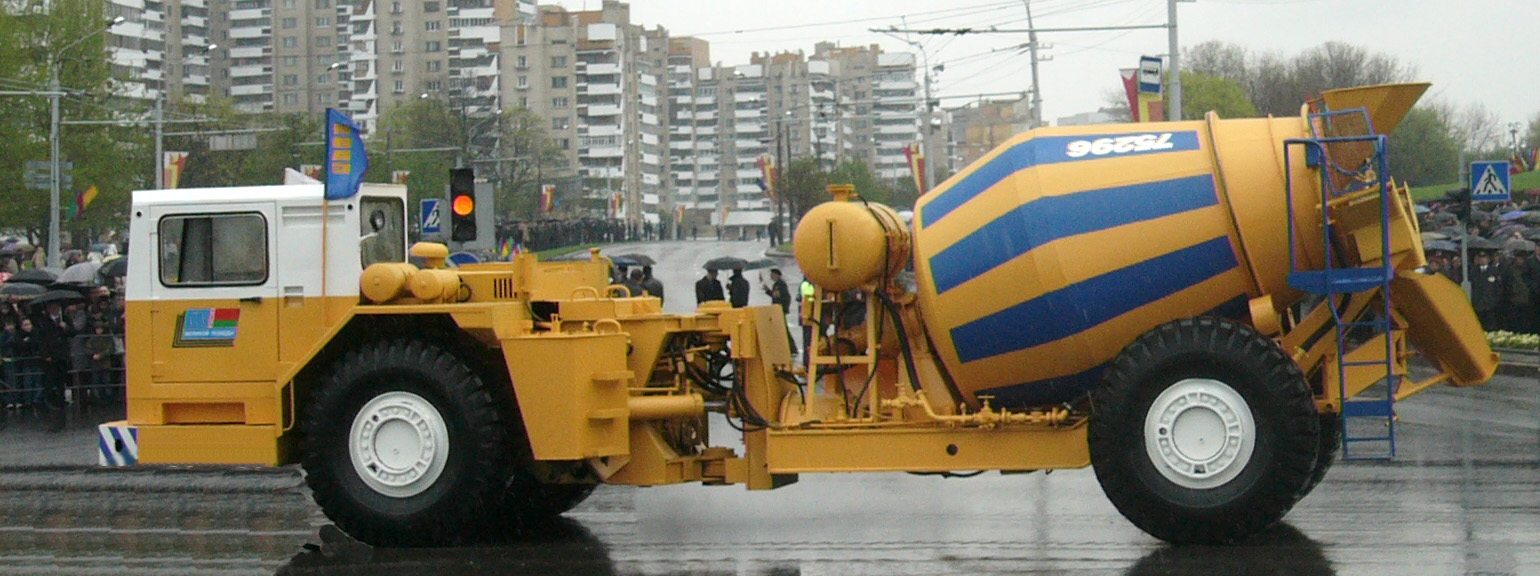
A BelAZ truck during the parade.

The 2005 Victory Day Parade celebrated the diamond jubilee of the end of the war. The parade was attended by President Alexander Lukashenko as the head of state. More than 2,500 troops representing all branches of the military and the uniformed services, as well as more than 200 pieces of military equipment participated. It was the first to be held on Victors Avenue. On 26 April, by order of Defence Minister Leonid Maltsev, the procedure for the preparation and conduct of demonstration flights was established. That same day, the flight crews and technical personnel of air bases participating in the flypast rehearsed near the 50th Mixed Air Base in the village of Machulishchi near Minsk. General rehearsals were held between 6–7 May.

There were 100,000 spectators attending the parade on 9 May. The president's speech preceded the actual parade proceedings, despite the fact there was reportedly poor audibility in spectator seats. The parade was inspected by Lieutenant General Maltsev and commanded by Major General Yuri Merentsov. A 20-minute exhibition of military drill by a 148-member honor guard concluded the parade as well as a performance by the Band of the Minsk Garrison led by Colonel Vladimir Ermolaev.

== 2010 parade ==
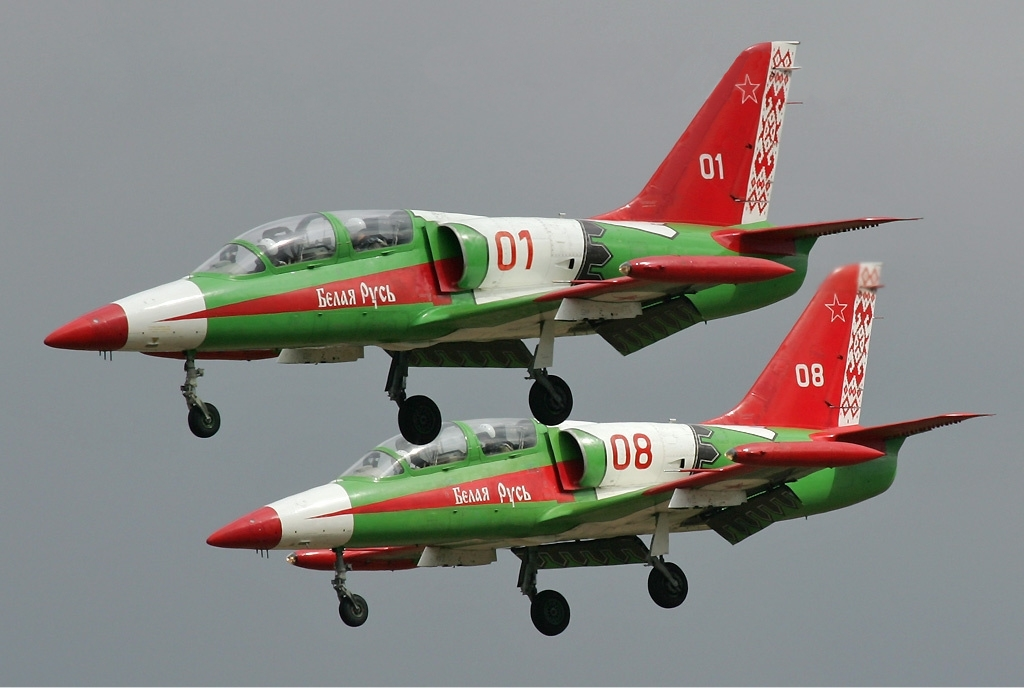
The Belaya Rus demonstration team during the parade.

The 2010 parade took place to celebrate the 65th anniversary of the end of the war. Inspecting the parade was the Minister of Defense Lieutenant General Yuri Zhadobin, with the officer commanding the parade being Deputy Minister of Defense, Major General Mikhail Puzikov. 350,000 people attended the parade according to the presidential office. Troops from Russia and Ukraine also took part in the parade (units from the 76th Guards Air Assault Division and the 95th Air Assault Brigade respectively). It was the first foreign appearance in the history of modern Belarusian parades. Among the parade formations in the procession were the 86th Communications Brigade and the Border Guard Service Institute, the latter of which was formed just four days prior. Almost 130 military vehicles participated in the mobile section of the parade. Equipment of the radio-technical troops and mobile command and control systems of the Belarusian military took part in the parade for the first time. Another feature of the mobile column was that for the first time, all equipment at the parade appeared in camouflage.

== 2015 parade ==
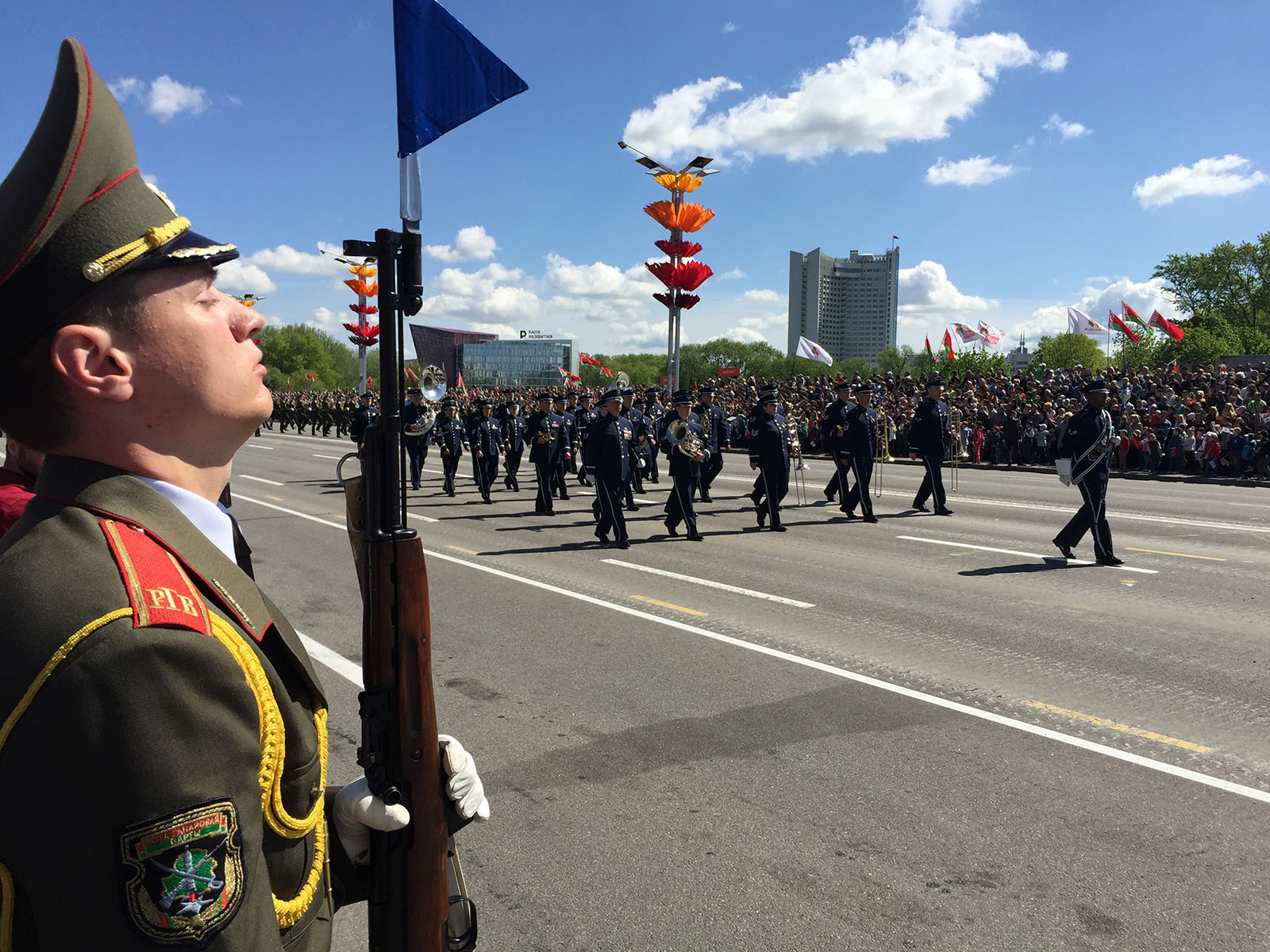
The USAFE Band.

The 2015 parade celebrated the 70th anniversary of the end of the war Presiding over the parade were Lieutenant General Andrei Ravkov and Major General Mikhail Puzikov. There were 5,000 troops on parade (including American and Russian troops). 40 members of the United States Air Forces in Europe Band were present at the parade representing the United States, while Russia was represented by the Russian Airborne Troops, as well as T-90 tanks that were brought into the Belarusian capital and Tu-22 supersonic strategic bombers among other aircraft. The Chinese manufactured Hongqi L5 made its inaugural debut at the parade for its as use the inspection vehicle for the defence minister and the parade commander.

== 2020 parade ==
The 2020 parade was in honour of the 75th anniversary of the end of the war. The two presiding officers of the parade were Minister of Defence Viktor Khrenin and Deputy Minister of Defense Sergei Potapenko in their respective positions as parade inspector and parade commander. Dmitry Mezentsev, the Russian Ambassador to Belarus, was the highest ranking foreign official at the parade, representing the Russian Federation. The aviation parade saw aircraft like the Su-30 fly overhead. The parade culminated in a theatrical performance of the famous song Den Pobedy. The 2020 parade was the only parade in the former Soviet Union besides Turkmenistan's to be held.

=== Impact of coronavirus outbreak on parade preparations ===
Due to the COVID-19 pandemic in Belarus, there were questions over the wisdom of holding a military parade. By the time the virus arrived in Belarus in later February, the Ministry of Defense had reportedly already had more than 2,000 servicemen arriving in Minsk to begin training. As per usual, the rehearsals with the mechanized columns took place at Lipki Aerodrome. A petition was created and submitted for consideration to the Ministry of Health and the Ministry of Defense calling for the cancellation of rehearsals as well as the parade. It also called for the banning of foreign military representatives in order to avoid the transmission of the virus. On 27 March, President Lukashenko reaffirmed his commitment to holding the parade, even saying that his government was "mulling over the possibilities for me to attend the parade there [in Moscow] as well".

Because of Lukashenko's plans, it was settled that the parade would be held in the early evening, following the format of jubilee Independence Day parades, in order to allow Lukashenko to attend the morning parade in Moscow first. This was later changed as soon as it was announced the Moscow parade was cancelled. On 11 April, Deputy Minister of Defense of Belarus, Sergei Potapenko, confirmed that preparations for the parade will continue and that no cancellation will be considered, saying that "a complex of antiepidemiologic and therapeutic measures is taking place" and that there are "no problems with preparing to the parade". Members of the Honor Guard of the Armed Forces of Belarus were infected with the virus by late April.

=== Governmental planning ===
When speaking on the decision to hold the parade to cabinet members, Lukashenko described it as "an emotional, deeply ideological thing". At that same meeting, he gave instructions that no one "should be dragged to this mass event". There were reports that suggested university students were offered incentives to attend the parade. These incentives, which manifested in a recruiting campaign among university students, included academic and dormitory bonuses for members of the Belarusian Academy of Sciences and recovered COVID-19 patients.

==== International presence at the parade ====
Parade formations from Russia and China were planned to be participants, until the spokespersons of both military departments cancelled their participation. On 5 May, Lukashenko has invited international leaders to attend the parade. He said: "I invite all heads of state, at least those from the former Soviet Union, to come to Minsk and attend this parade." The day after this statement was made, the office of Ukrainian President Volodymyr Zelenskyy announced that he would not travel to Minsk for the parade. In a video conference with Prescient Lukashenko, Moldovan President Igor Dodon expressed how "impressed" he was by the fact that the parade was still able to go on. Lukashenko also was open to the presence of Russian deputies and senators who expressed a desire to attend the parade in Minsk, saying that "We welcome this" and that "We don’t close the doors from our friends and brothers". The ambassadors of the following 18 countries attended: Azerbaijan, Armenia, Hungary, Venezuela, Vietnam, Iran, North Korea, Kazakhstan, China, Kyrgyzstan, Moldova, Palestine, Russia, Slovakia, Turkey, Tajikistan, the UAE and Serbia. In addition, the chargés d'affaires of Sudan, Libya and Pakistan, and the Permanent Representative of Russia to the CIS, Andrei Grozov were in attendance. One of the attendees was Slovak Ambassador and former Speaker of National Council of the Slovak Republic Jozef Migaš, who resigned later on as a result of his attendance.

=== Effects ===
==== Public reactions ====
Disagreements with the government's stance came in the form of public criticisms and expressions of concern. Belarusian opposition leader Gennady Fedynich compared the parade to holding "a feast during the plague". Other criticisms came from prominent opposition leaders such as Stanislav Shushkevich, Mikhail Chigir. On May 9, 2020, dozens of supporters of Belarusian blogger and activist Syarhei Tsikhanouski held an "Anti-parade" in Babruisk to express their disagreement with the Victory Day Parade in Minsk during the COVID-19 pandemic. The protest parade took the form of a protest motor rally. Police detained about 15 people after the motor rally. Syarhei Tsikhanouski was in detention in that moment.

==== On the pandemic ====
The World Health Organization attributed the rising rate of infections in the country to the "lack of adequate social distancing measures" and urged the government cancel the parade. The day of the parade saw and increase of case by 1271 people, with the trend staying the same over the next couple of days. On 13 May, NEXTA reported a total of 27,717 cases with a daily gain of 1,369.

==== On relations with Russia ====
In the Western media, the parade gave the appearance of an attempt to upstage the Moscow celebrations. The contrasting messages from both countries clashed when the Belarusian government accused Channel One Russia correspondent Alexei Kruchinin and his cameraman of spreading fake news about the virus in Belarus. On 6 May, Kremlin Press Secretary Dmitry Peskov refuted allegations that Russian President Vladimir Putin criticized Lukashenko for holding the parade, calling them "unreliable wild speculations". Investigative journalist Ihar Tyshkevich suggested that one of the motives for holding the parade was to fight Russian propaganda about the country that had increased in the previous year.

== 2025 ==
The 2025 parade celebrated the 80th anniversary of the end of the war. It was held in the evening to allow for President Lukashenko to participate after attending the 2025 Moscow Victory Day Parade that day. Presiding over the parade were Defence Minister Lieutenant General Viktor Khrenin and Deputy Defense Minister Major General Alexander Naumenko. The parade included units from Azerbaijan, Kazakhstan, Kyrgyzstan, Tajikistan, Uzbekistan, China, and Russia (Mikhailovskaya Military Artillery Academy and Nizhny Novgorod Cadet Corps of the Volga Federal District). For the first time, the procession of the flag of Belarus and the Victory Banner held before the inspection of troops.

== See also ==
- Minsk Independence Day Parade
- Moscow Victory Day Parade
- Victory Day Parades
