= Belaya Rus (demonstration team) =

- Belarusian Air Force badge
- Active: 2006 – Present
- Country: Belarus
- Branch: Belarusian Air Force
- Role: Aerobatic flight display team
- Size: 5 Aircraft
- Part of: 206 Flight Training Center
- Base: Lida
- Colours: Red, White, Green

Aircraft flown
- Fighter: Aero L-39 Albatros

Belaya Rus (Russian: Белая Русь) is an aerobatic team of the Air Force and Air Defence Forces of the Republic of Belarus which performs aerobatics from combat training Aero L-39 Albatros. The team performs at aviation and public holidays in the Republic of Belarus.

== Overview ==
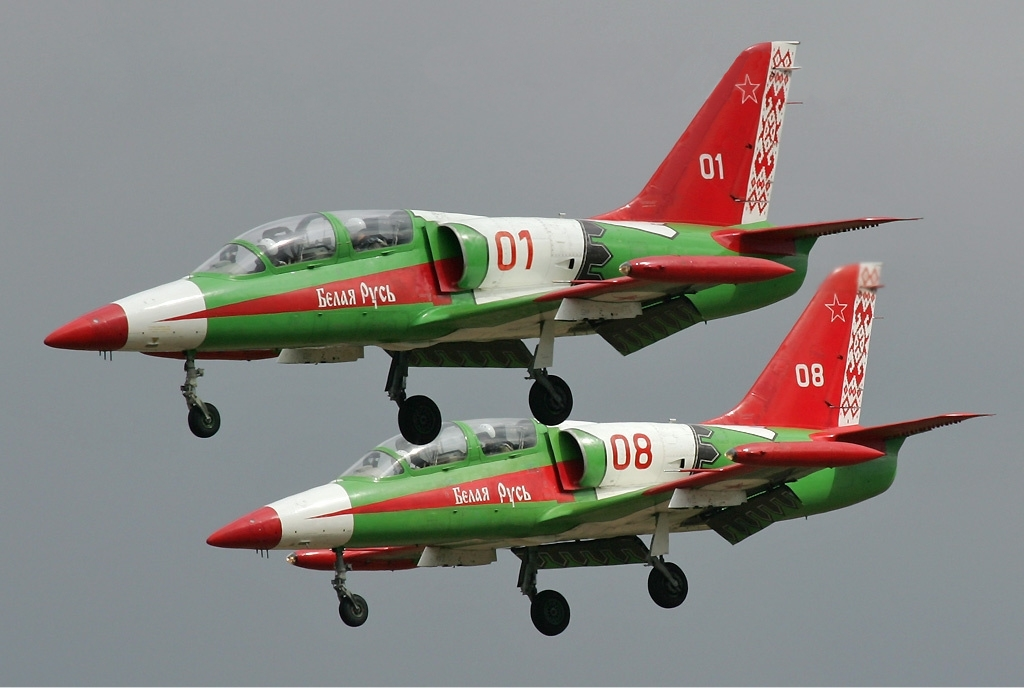
The team during the 2010 Minsk Victory Day Parade

The group was created in 2006 after the purchase of ten Czech-made L-39 Albatros training aircraft from Ukraine. It is part of the 206 Flight Training Center in Lida. In addition to performances, the group's planes play the role of training aircraft for cadets of the Aviation Department of the Military Academy of Belarus. Since 2008, the Belaya Rus aerobatic team has been participating in all air parades during the Minsk Independence Day Parade and the Victory Day Parade over the central Avenue.

In 2008, there was information that at the same time as the Belaya Rus group, a new aerobatic team of the Air Force and Air Defense Forces on the Su-27 heavy fighters would be created on the basis of 61 IAB. Its working name is "Wings of Belarus". This was announced at a press conference by Air Force Commander Major General Igor Azarenok. An agreement was reached on training Belarusian specialists in Russia in 2008, where several aerobatic teams operate, in particular, the Swifts.
