= 2015 Victory Day parade =

2015 Victory Day parade may refer to:

- 2015 Minsk Victory Day Parade, on 9 May 2015
- 2015 Moscow Victory Day Parade, on 9 May 2015
- 2015 China Victory Day Parade, on 3 September 2015
