= Lipki Aerodrome =

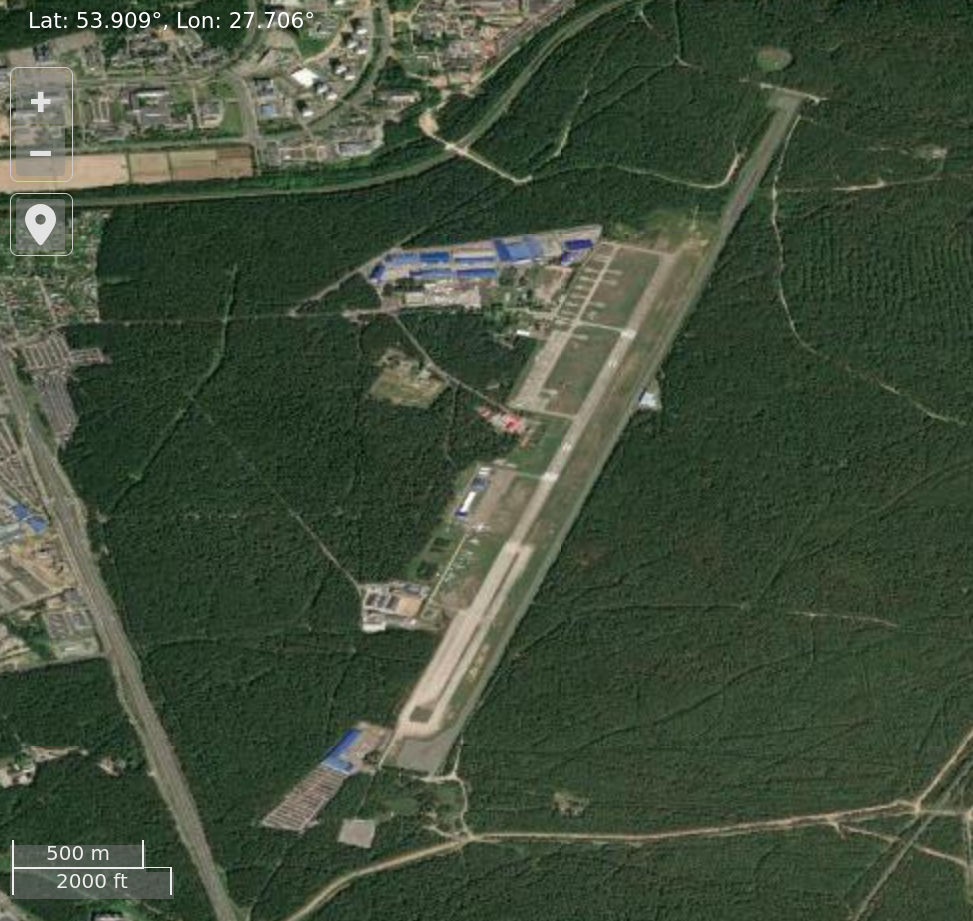
- Satellite imagery of Lipki Aerodrome
- IATA: none; ICAO: UMMI

Summary
- Airport type: Public
- Owner: Ministry of Emergency Situations (Belarus)
- Operator: Ministry of Emergency Situations (Belarus)
- Serves: Minsk
- Location: Minsk, Minsk Oblast, Belarus
- Coordinates: 53°54′34″N 27°42′22″E

Map
- Location of airport in Belarus Lipki Aerodrome (Europe)

Lipki Aerodrome (Belarusian: Аэрадром Ліпкі, Russian: Аэродром Липки) is a civil/military airport serving the city of Minsk, the capital of the Republic of Belarus. It began operating in 1980 during the Soviet era. On 21 August 2002, the government transferred control of the aerodrome from the Defence Ministry of Belarus to the Ministry of Emergency Situations. In 2016, the Minsk Independence Day Parade early rehearsals took place on the airfield. On 24 July 2017, an updated runway and training center were commissioned. The Minsk Aeroclub DOSAAF was transferred to the aerodrome from Borovaya, and the airfield became capable to receive small civil aircraft. As a result, the Republican Aviation Search and Rescue Center of the Ministry of Emergency Situations of was relocated to this site. Since then, Lipki has been the site of an athletic base, a heated hangar for aircraft, helicopter pads, and an automatic weather station. It also has areas in which it provides customs and border control.

== See also ==
- List of airports in Belarus
- Transport in Belarus
