= Border Guard Service Institute of Belarus =

Professional school in Belarus

Coordinates: 53.9432227°N 27.6303918°E

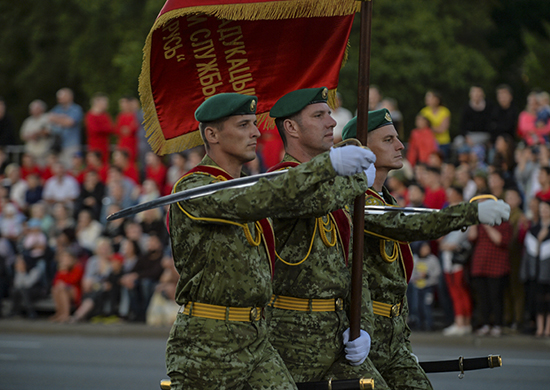
A color guard from the institute during the 2019 Minsk Independence Day Parade.

The Border Guard Service Institute of Belarus (Belarusian: Iнстытут пагранiчнай службы Рэспублікі Беларусь, romanized: Instytut pahraničnaj služby Respubliki Bielaruś) is the educational institution of the Border Guard Service of Belarus.

== History ==
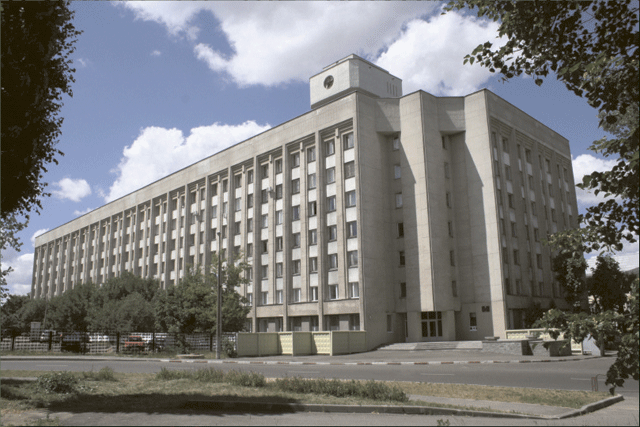
Institute headquarters in Minsk

The school was established on August 19, 1993, when, in accordance with the Resolution of the Council of Ministers of the Republic of Belarus No. 564 the Minsk Higher Military-Political-Arms School faculty was established for border troops. On May 17, 1995, Presidential Decree 192 created the Military Academy of Belarus, which included the faculty of border troops. The first graduation of officers was in 1997. During its existence, the faculty held 13 graduations for about 1,000 border guard officers; 25 students received gold medals and 69 graduated with honors. The institute was established in accordance by decree of the President Alexander Lukashenko on May 5, 2010. Just four days later, on Victory Day, it made its first national appearance among the parade formations participating in the 2010 Minsk Victory Day Parade on Victors Avenue. From July 1, 2010, the institute began as an independent entity and the successor of the Border Guard Service Institute. It is an independent institution of higher education, forming a single integrated system of training, retraining and advanced training of human resources for the border service.

== Artistic Ensemble ==
=== Choir ===
The choir of the Border Guard Service of the Republic of Belarus as well as the whole ensemble work under the umbrella of the institute.

=== Exemplary Band ===
The exemplary band is an affiliated musical unit of the Military Band Service of the Armed Forces of the Republic of Belarus. Under the direction of Captain Pavel Pashkin, the band supports ceremonial events and activities at the border service institute. The 30-member until operates as a representation of a typical Belarusian military band, with its repertoire mostly composed of military songs and marches, alongside hymns, waltzes, jazz, pop music and other musical works.

== See also ==
- Armed Forces of Belarus
- State Border Committee of the Republic of Belarus
- Military Academy of Belarus
- Ministry of the Interior Academy of the Republic of Belarus
- Minsk Suvorov Military School
