= Sergey Kostiuchenko =

Military director and musician

Colonel Serguei Kostiuchenko
- Сергей Костюченко
- Born: 17 December 1965 (age 60); Belarusian SSR, Soviet Union
- Military career
- Allegiance: USSR; Belarus
- Service years: 1981-2019
- Rank: Colonel
- Commands: Military Band Service of the Armed Forces of the Republic of Belarus

Sergey Nikolaevich Kostiuchenko (Russian: Сергей Николаевич Костюченко) is a Belarusian military conductor. He is the former Chief Director of the Military Band Service of the Armed Forces of the Republic of Belarus, holding this post from 2008-2019. At 11 in the band service was the second longest serving director of the bands after Alexander Fedorov who served for 14 years.

== Early life and career ==
He was born on 17 December 1965. At the age of six he began to learn to play the accordion and wind instruments. In 1981, Kostiuchenko was enrolled in the Moscow Military Music College. After graduating with honors in 1985, he entered the Tchaikovsky Moscow State Conservatory.

In 1990, he was appointed the chief conductor for the massed bands of the Belarusian Military District. Between 1990 and 2008, he served as military conductor of the Band of the 103rd Guards Airborne Division. He later would serve as chief conductor for the Band of the Minsk Higher Engineering Air Defense Missile School and the Honor Guard of the Armed Forces. At the same time, he simultaneously served as the deputy chief of the military band service under V. Ermolaev.

Since 2008, he has served as the Director of the Military Band Service of the Armed Forces and the Exemplary Central Band. During his tenure, he led the band’s participation in several military music festivals, including Moscow’s Spasskaya Tower Military Music Festival and Tattoo.

He retired in the summer of 2019, with his last public duty being the director of the bands of the Minsk Garrison during the Minsk Independence Day Parade in 2019, which celebrated the 75th anniversary of the Minsk Offensive. He was succeeded by Lieutenant Colonel Igor Khlebus.

== See also ==
- Central Band of the Armed Forces of the Republic of Belarus
