= Vadim Sinyavsky (politician) =

Belarusian politician (born 1970)

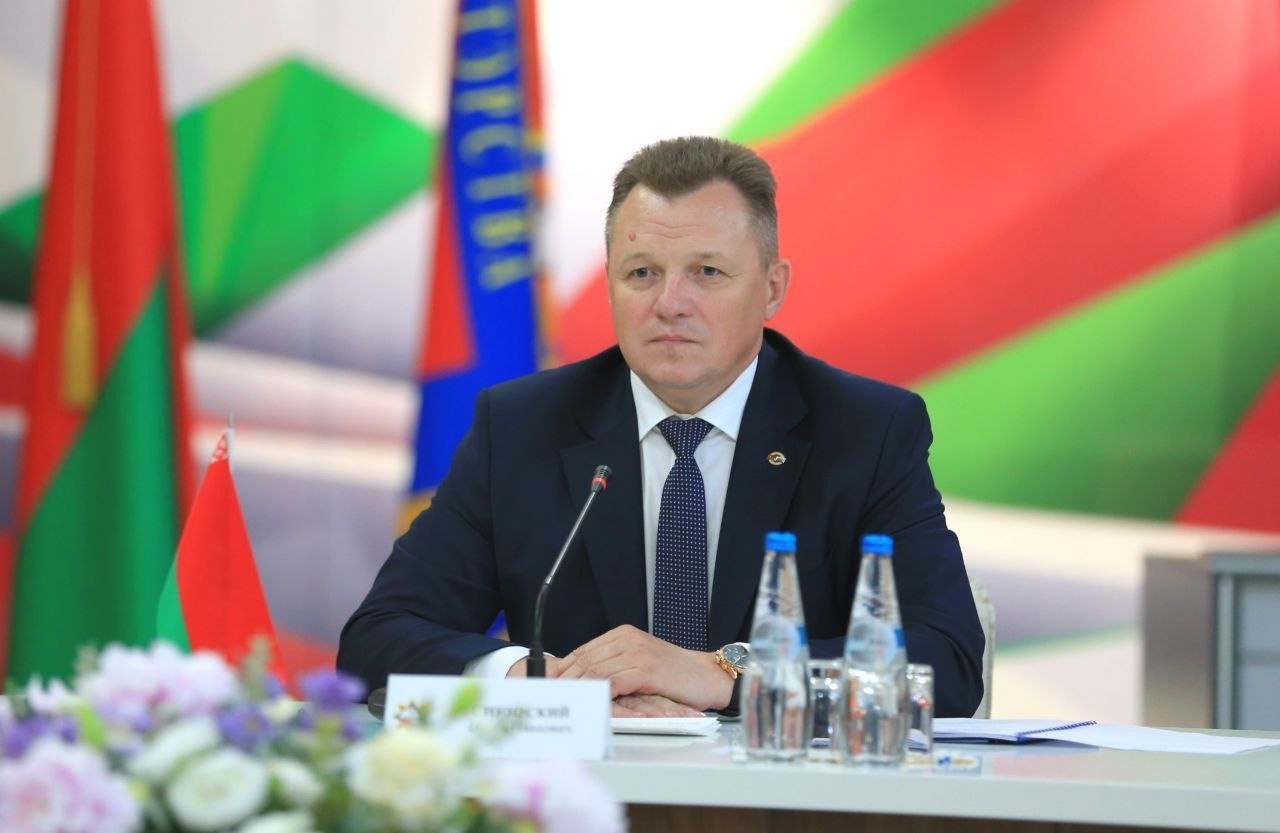
- Sinyavsky in 2022

Minister of Emergency Situations
- Incumbent
- Assumed office 11 March 2021
- President: Alexander Lukashenko
- Prime Minister: Roman Golovchenko; Alexander Turchin
- Preceded by: Vladimir Vashchenko

Personal details
- Born: 15 May 1970 (age 55)

Vadim Ivanovich Sinyavsky (Russian: Вадим Иванович Синявский; born 15 May 1970) is a Belarusian politician serving as minister of emergency situations since 2021. From 2014 to 2021, he served as head of the regional police of Grodno.
