= Honor Guard Company (Belarus) =

Ceremonial unit in Belarus

- Рота ганаровай варты
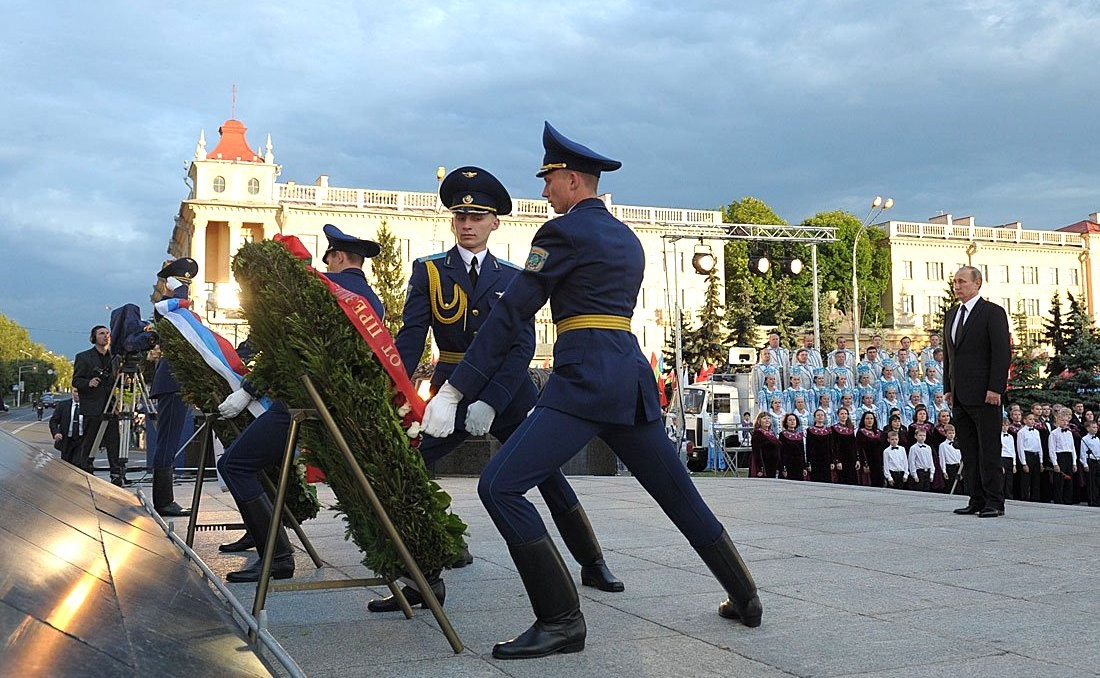
- Soldiers of the company at the victory monument in Minsk.
- Active: 22 January 1995; 31 years ago
- Country: Belarus
- Branch: Armed Forces of Belarus
- Type: Honor Guard
- Role: Ceremonial guard
- Part of: Minsk Military Commandant's Service
- Garrison/HQ: Minsk
- Anniversaries: 17 February (Day of the Honor Guard)
- Decorations: (Venezuela) Order of 19 April

Commanders
- Current commander: First Lieutenant Vladislav Shepelevich
- Deputy Commander: Nikolay Grishankov

Insignia
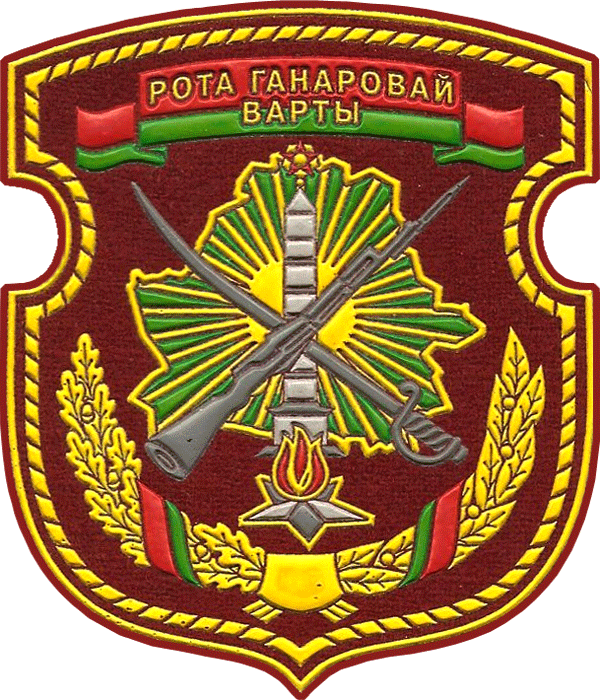
- Ceremonial Patch

The Honor Guard Company of the Minsk Military Commandant's Service (Belarusian: Рота ганаровай варты Мінскай ваеннай камендатуры, romanized: Rota hanarovaj varty Minskaj vajennaj kamiendatury; Russian: Рота почётного караула Минской военной комендатуры) is an honor guard unit of the Armed Forces of Belarus.

== Brief descriptor ==
The company was formed on 22 January 1995 as a unit from the Minsk Air Defense and Rocket School and the Minsk Higher Military Command School. To become a member of the honor guard of Belarus, one should be at least 185 cm (6 ft 1 in) and have strong health features. It was later made into an independent unit on 17 February. It is one of the youngest units of its kind in the Commonwealth of Independent States. Daily training in the company lasts at least 6 hours. The company is made up of 144 military men, all of whom takes part in ceremonies in celebrations in Belarus and other countries, such as China, France, Poland, Qatar, Russia, the United Arab Emirates and Venezuela. Despite being part of the Minsk Commandant's Service, it does not actively recruit from the Minsk area.

== Duties ==
During a meeting two days after a Russian parade in which the unit participated, President Alexander Lukashenko described it as the "crème de la crème of the Belarusian military". This is reflected in the numerous events the company is seen at such as wreath laying ceremonies and arrival ceremonies (for foreign heads of state at the Independence Palace, heads of government at the Government House and military leaders at the Defence Ministry). The commander of the guard introduces the unit in the Belarusian language during state visits, one of the only institutions to use the language. It has received a number of guests, including the Presidents of Azerbaijan, Turkmenistan, Georgia, India, Turkey, Cuba, the United States of America, Vietnam and Zimbabwe, the Prime Ministers of Hungary, Italy as well as figures such as the Patriarch of Moscow and all Rus'. During the Minsk II meetings in 2015, guardsmen did not leave the territory of the Palace of Independence more than 16 hours, periodically replacing each other at their posts.

The annual Victory Day procession and Independence Day Parades on Victors Avenue take place with the full participation of the company. The Defender of the Fatherland Day ceremony on Victory Square is also covered by the company. During the Independence Day parade, it is notable not only for providing ceremonial markers in front of the tribune, but also performing precision exhibition drill since the 2002 parade on October Square. Since 2004, the unit performing this drill routine known as the "Combined Guard of Honour Company" (Belarusian: Зводнай Роты Ганаровай Варты), consisting of full-time units personnel from the Armed Forces, the Border Guard Service, and the Internal Troops of the Ministry of Internal Affairs.

It conducts a number of community organized events, having visited a local gymnasium in 2017 for example. It celebrated its silver jubilee in 2020, getting large congratulations from Defence Minister Viktor Khrenin. In preparations for the 2020 Minsk Victory Day Parade and during the COVID-19 pandemic in Belarus, members of the company was infected with COVID-19.

=== Foreign parades ===
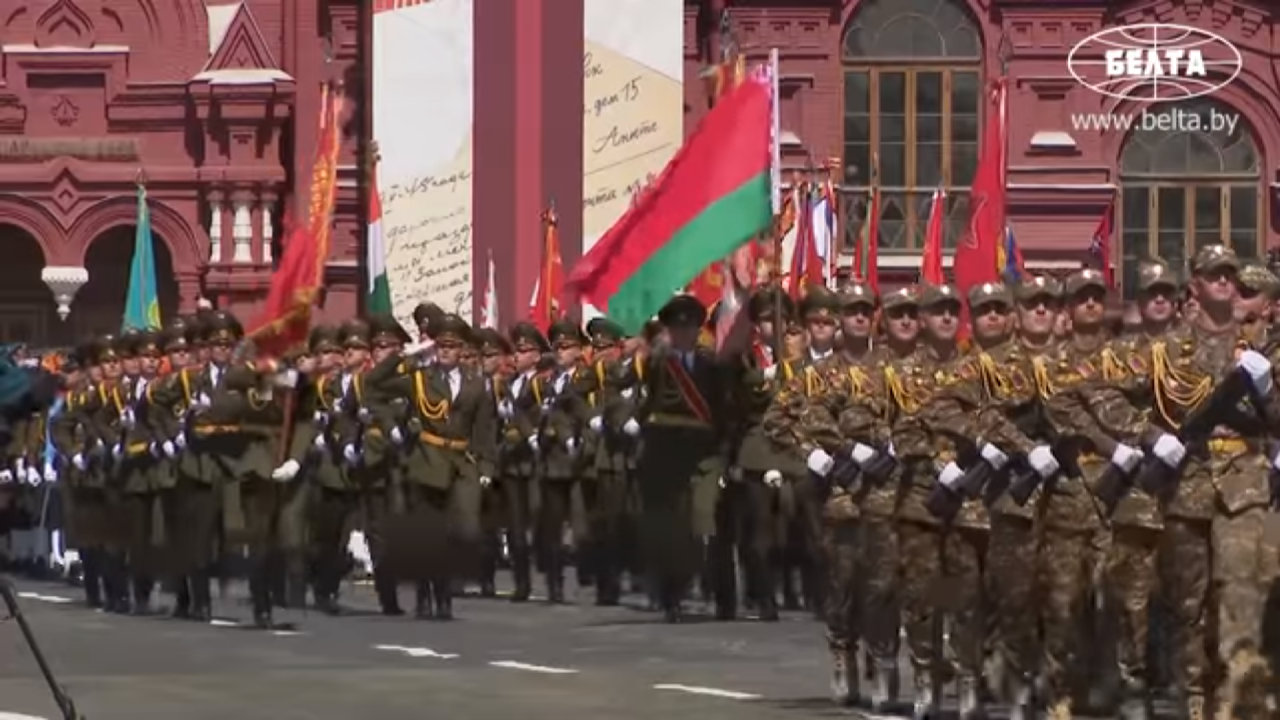
The unit on the Red Square.

In 2014, a colour guard took part in Bastille Day military parade in France marking the centennial of the outbreak of the First World War. During the 2010 Caracas Independence Day parade in Fort Tiuna, the company performed its own unique drill routine. It was also represented at the parade on Heroes' Avenue. Those who participated in the trip were presented with an engraved watch from President Alexander Lukashenko. In 2013, 2016, 2017 and 2019, it sent an exhibition team to Moscow with the Exemplary Military Band to participate in the Spasskaya Tower Military Music Festival and Tattoo on Red Square. The members of the company have also taken part in the 2015 China Victory Day Parade. In 2020, it participated in the 75th anniversary Moscow Victory Day Parade on Red Square for the first time. During the parade, the banners of the Zheleznyak Partisan Detachment and three units who participated in the Minsk Offensive were carried by the company.

== Organization ==
- Honor Guard of the Minsk Military Commandant's Service
  - Honor Guard of the Armed Forces
  - Honor Guard of the Internal Troops (Military Unit 3214)
  - Honor Guard Company of the Border Troops

All other Commandant's Services of Belarus have their own honor guard units.

== Unit Band ==
The Band of the Honor Guard Company of the Minsk Military Commandant's Service was founded on 1 July 1995, as the Military Band of the Minsk Garrison's Office. Since 2018, the band has used chromatic fanfare trumpets in its ranks. For 21 years until 2016, the commander of the band was Sergey Kostiuchenko. It works alongside the honor guard in taking part state visits and other ceremonies in Belarus. The signature march of the band is the Grenadiers March. The band is under the Military Band Service of the Armed Forces. The following have served as directors of the Band of the Honor Guard:

- Lieutenant Colonel Igor Khelbus (1993–1995)
- Lieutenant Colonel Sergey Kostiuchenko (1995–2005)
- Major Aleksandr Kantsyal (2016–Present)

The company and the band commonly work together on joint visits to different countries.

== Company commanders ==
The following have commanded the company:

- Konstantin Chernetsky (May 1995-February 1999)
- Alexander Pogulyaylo (February 1999-February 2002)
- Nikolai Kurash (February 2002-February 2004)
- Captain Dmitry Karpovich (February 2004-May 2009)
- Senior Lieutenant Pavel Guryanov (May 2009-?)

== Gallery ==
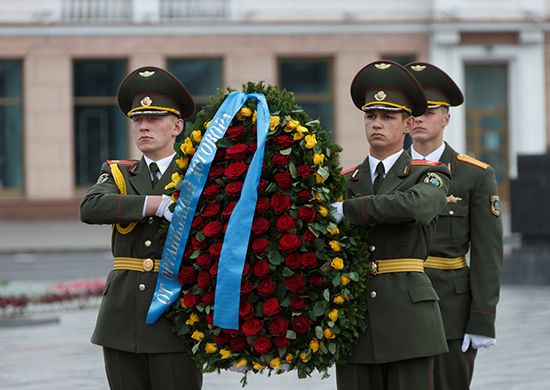
A Wreath laying team provided by the honor guard.

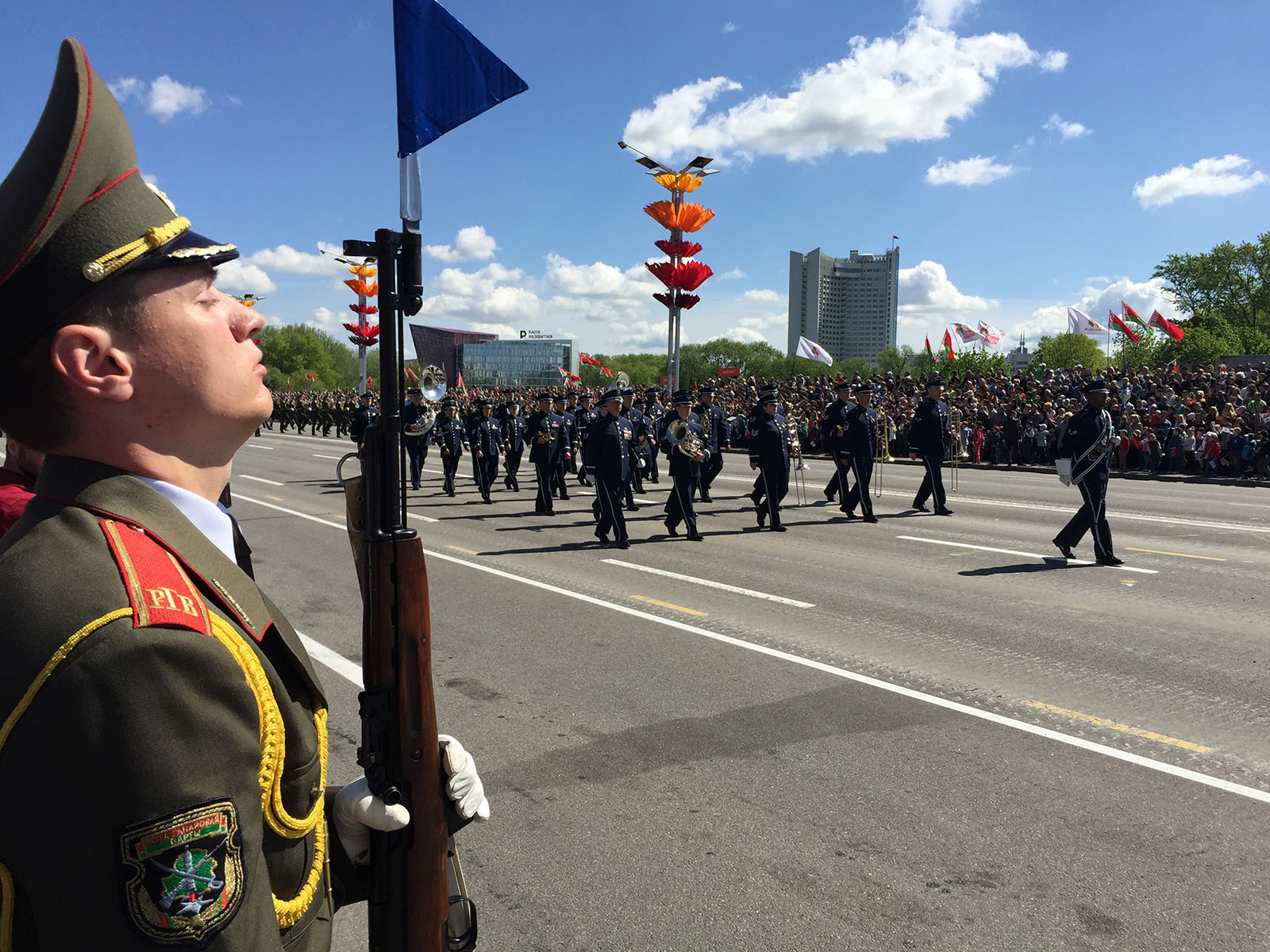
A member of the guard providing security during the 2015 Minsk Victory Day Parade.

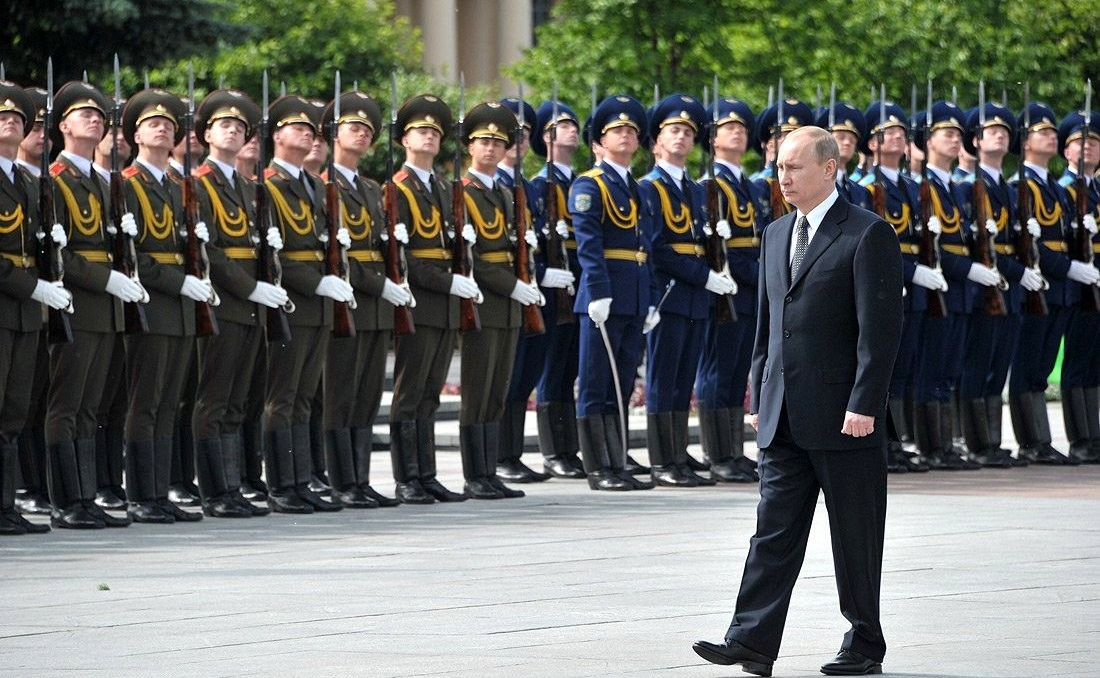
Russian President Vladimir Putin passing in front of the guard on Victory Square

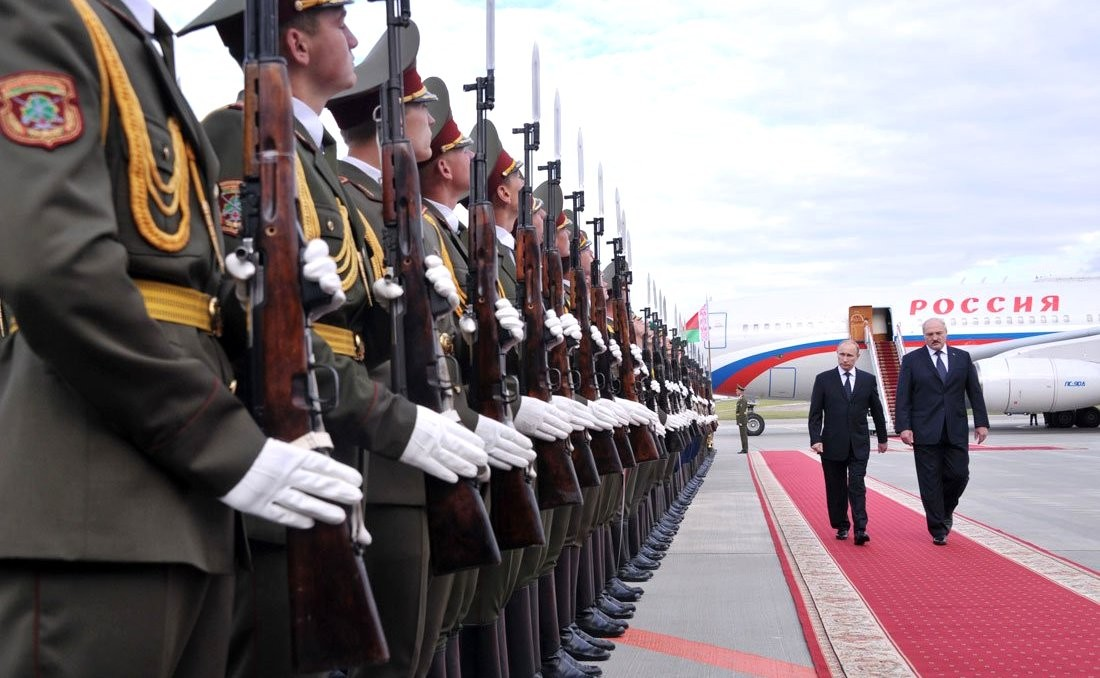
President Putin and President Alexander Lukashenko inspecting the guard during the former's arrival ceremony at Minsk National Airport in 2012.

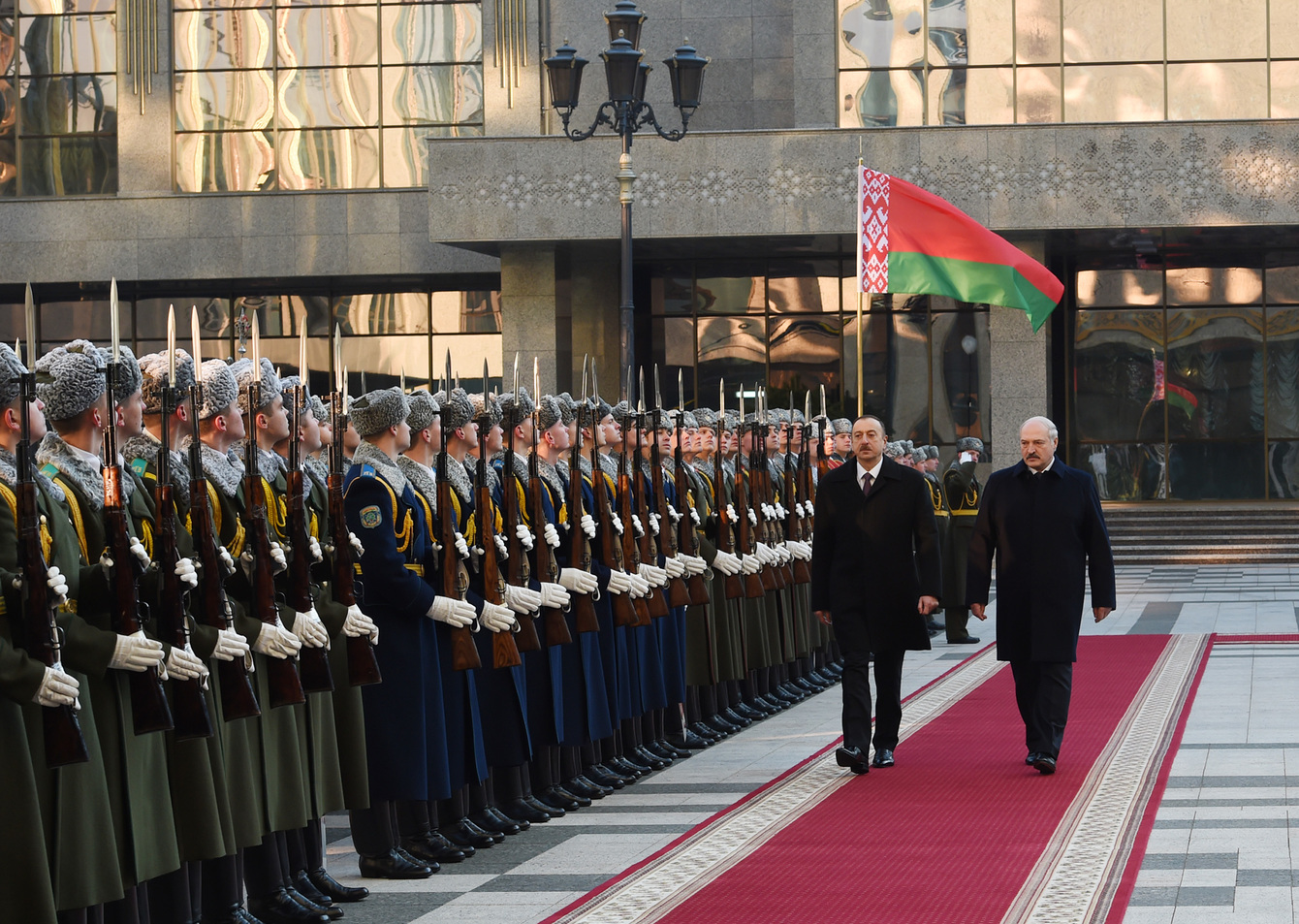
The guard being inspected by President Ilham Aliyev during his visit to the Independence Palace, Minsk.

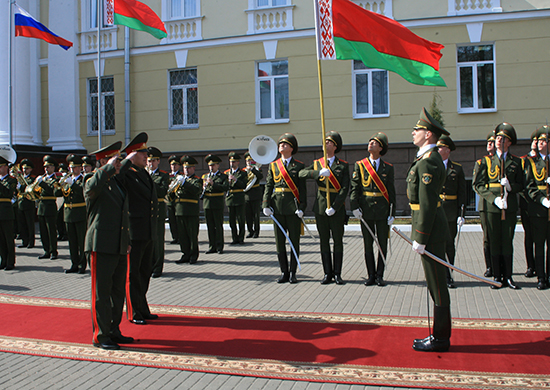
The guard rendering honors to Russian defence minister Sergey Shoygu at the defence ministry headquarters.

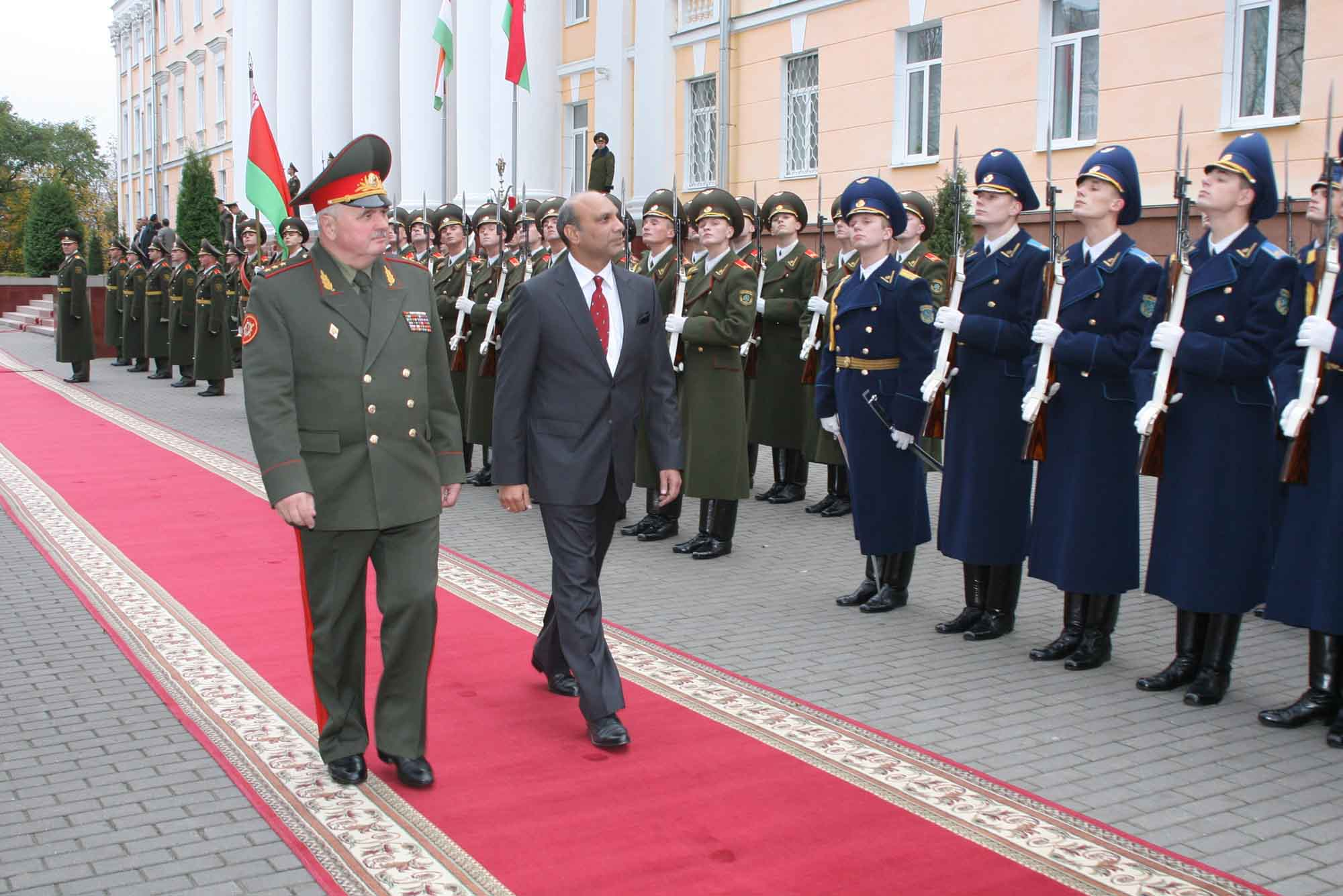
Indian Minister of State for Defence M. M. Pallam Raju inspecting the guard in October 2009.

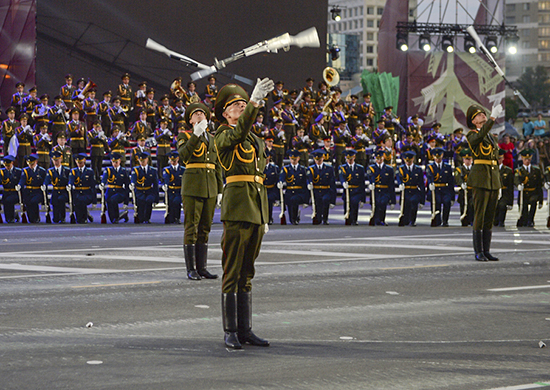
A member of the guard performing precision drill.

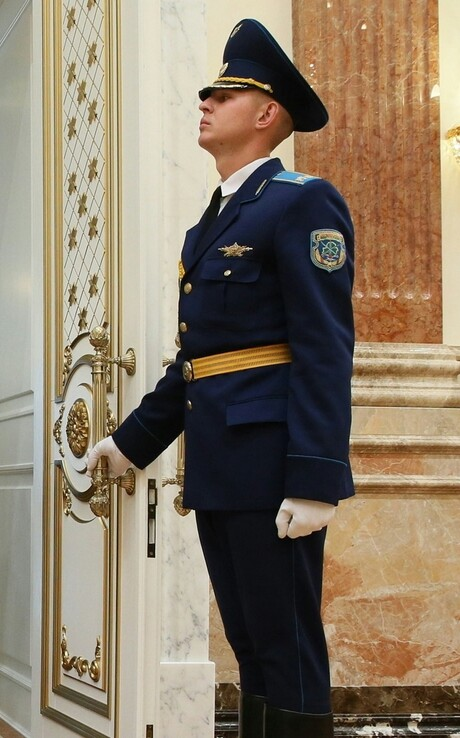
A soldier of the company at the Independence Palace.

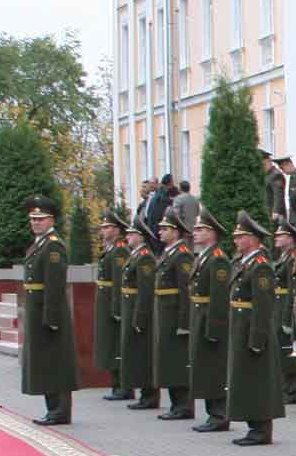
Band of the Honor Guard Company at the Ministry of Defence.

== See also ==
- Kremlin Regiment
- 154th Preobrazhensky Independent Commandant's Regiment
- Honor Guard Company of the Ministry of Defense of Kazakhstan
- Independent Honor Guard Battalion of the Ministry of Defence of Turkmenistan
- Kyiv Presidential Honor Guard Battalion
- Honor Guard Company (Moldova)
