= University of Civil Protection of the Ministry of Emergency Situations (Belarus) =

Belarusian state university

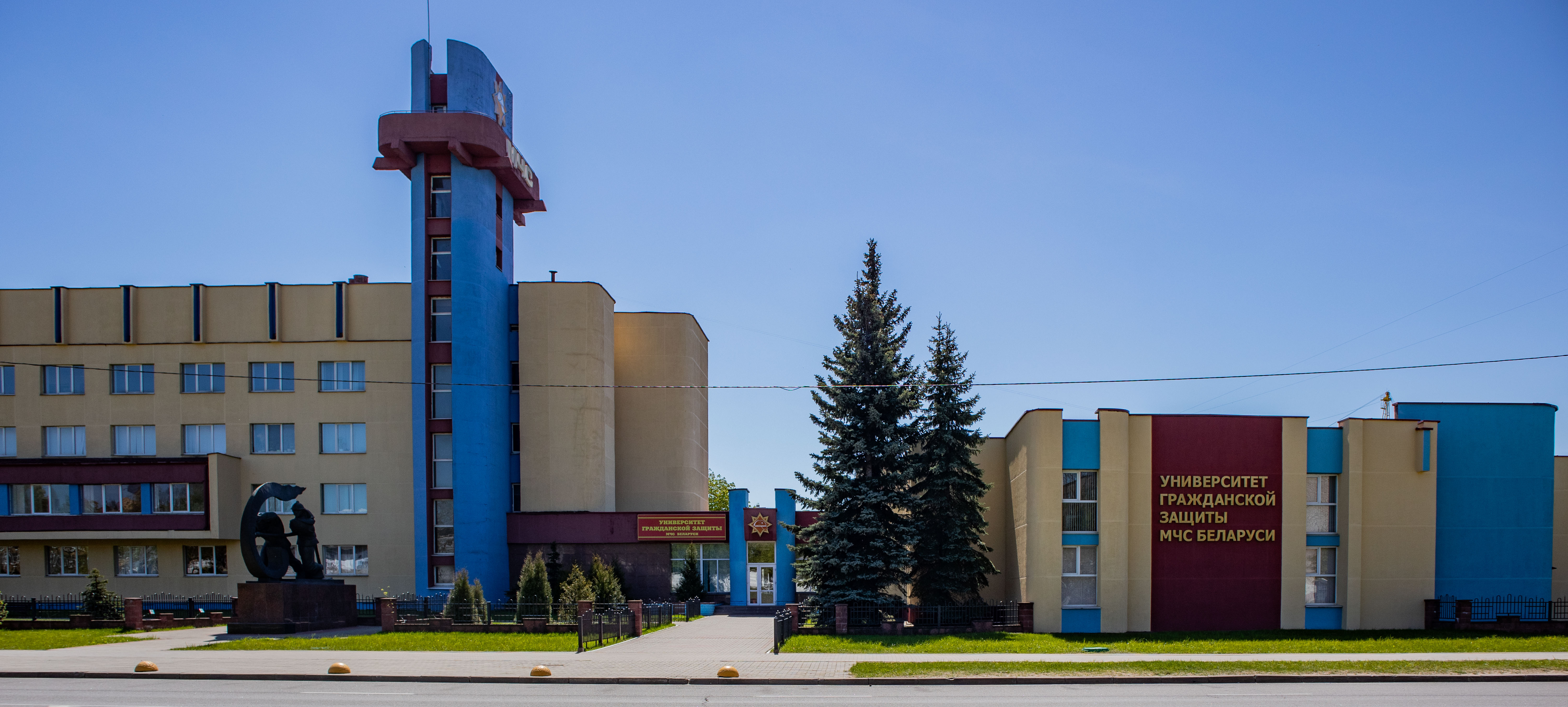
University of Civil Protection

The University of Civil Protection of the Ministry of Emergency Situations (Russian: Университет гражданской защиты МЧС Республики Беларусь) is a state institution for the training of highly qualified specialists in the Ministry of Emergency Situations. It is accredited by the National Academy of Sciences of Belarus.

== History ==
The history of the educational institution dates back to 27 September 1933, when the Fire and Technical School was established. It served to prepare personnel of the Minsk Fire Brigade. This laid the foundation for the modern national university. In 1945, at the end of the Great Patriotic War, the School was renamed to the School of Sergeant Staff of the Militarized Fire Department of the Ministry of Internal Affairs of the Byelorussian Soviet Socialist Republic. It was renamed three times (1948, 1974 and 1984) before finally, in 1992, it was reorganized into the Higher Fire-Technical School of the Ministry of Internal Affairs. Since 2000, it has been part of the Ministry of Emergencies. In 2016, the university was created by combining the Command and Engineering Institute with other educational institutions of the Ministry of Emergencies, namely the Gomel Engineering Institute and the Institute of Retraining and Advanced Training, both of which provided training in the same or related specialties. Since 2002, the institute has trained citizens of Azerbaijan, Lithuania, Tajikistan, Kazakhstan, Russia and Turkmenistan. The Institute is a member of the European Association of Higher Education Institutions (EFSCA). Since 2003, more than 4,000 foreign specialists from 48 nations have been trained at the university, including those from the Commonwealth of Independent States (CIS) and the Collective Security Treaty Organization.

== Organization ==
- Gomel Branch Establishment
- Institute for Retraining and Professional Development (IRPD)
- Teacher resource center
- Faculty of Emergency Prevention and Elimination
- Administration Training Faculty
- Corresponding and Distant Learning Faculty
- Technosphere Safety Faculty
- Faculty of Postgraduate Scientific Education
- Engineering Faculty (Gomel)
- Faculty of Life Activity Safety
- Center of Crisis Psychological Assistance
- Lyceum
- Training ground

The International Rescuers’ Training Centre is the institution providing training for international specialists on a range of training programs in the fields rescue operations, CBRN defense and the emergency training of aircraft pilots.

=== Lyceum ===
The State Educational Establishment "Specialized Lyceum at the University of Civil Protection" was established on 25 May 2004. Only males who have finished the 5th grade can apply at the lyceum for 5 a year term of study (7-11 grade) It is akin the Minsk Suvorov Military School in the Armed Forces of Belarus. The Lyceum is located on the territory of the former Selmashevets pioneer camp, whose facilities have not been used since 1989, and as a result were in extremely poor condition. Most of its facilities were restored through efforts of the Gomel Oblast Executive Committee. Among events hosted at the lyceum is the annual New Year's Eve competitions at the end of year "Parade of Stars". It has to date produced over 500 graduates.

== Heads ==
- Alexey Kozachenko (1933-1937)
- Semyon Gerasimov (1937-1939)
- Genukh Lopatukhin (1939-1941)
- Andrey Aleshkevich (1944-1948)
- Alexander Shakhvorostov (1948-1953)
- Appolinarius Utkin (1953-1959)
- Pavel Branovets (1959-1971)
- Viktor Lubinsky (1971-1973)
- Alexander Rubchenya (1973-1981)
- Boris Kulakovsky (1981-1984)
- Vladimir Vorobyov (1984-2005)
- Gennady Lasuta (2006-2009)
- Ivan Polevoda (2009 — present)

== Identity ==
Being an educational institution, it is entailed to an emblem, a graduation badge and unit color. Its slogan is "Effective education through tradition of quality and innovation dynamics". In May 2017, it was awarded the Award of the Government of Belarus for achievements in its field. In 2015, the university was awarded the EFSCA Gold Medal. One of the main activities of the university is physical activities. There are 11 sports sections and 15 kinds of sport are held at the university. Many participate on the national team of the Republic of Belarus.

Cadets of the academy are annual participants in the Minsk Independence Day Parade on Victors Avenue, representing all servicemen of the EMERCOM in a single parade formation. The Gomel Engineering Institute formerly maintained a guard of honor, which was founded in 2004 by order of Minister of Emergency Situations Valery Astapev. It now works with the university and consists of 40 people, of which 35 are cadets.

== See also ==
- Military Academy of Belarus
- Ministry of the Interior Academy of the Republic of Belarus
