= Minsk Independence Day Parade =

Event in Minsk, Belarus

Minsk Independence Day Parade Парад у Мінску ў гонар Незалежнасці Беларусі
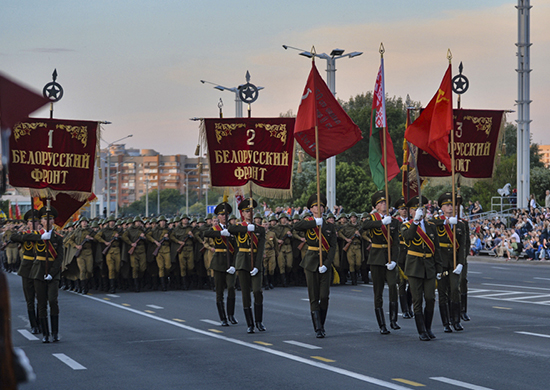
- The historical color guard during the rehearsal of the 2019 parade.
- Genre: Military parades
- Begins: 3 July
- Frequency: Annual
- Venue: Victors Avenue
- Location: Minsk
- Country: Belarus
- Inaugurated: 1997
- Previous event: 2024
- Next event: 2026
- Organiser: Ministry of Defense (Main Directorate of Ideology)

The Minsk Independence Day Parade (Belarusian: Парад у Мінску ў гонар Незалежнасці Беларусі) also known as the 3 July Parade is the main event of the Independence Day of Belarus. This parade is held annually in Minsk on 3 July. It is held every year except years that celebrate Victory Day (9 May), during which Victory Day Parades are held.

== Summary ==
The celebrations begin as the parade commander (usually the Deputy Defense Minister) arrives to take command of the parade formations from a commander of the first company participating in the parade. At 10am, the President of Belarus arrives on Victors Avenue and gets on the central grandstand to await the start of the parade. The parade commander gives the order to begin the review of the Minsk Garrison by the Defence Minister of Belarus, the parade presenting arms at this juncture. The Deputy Defense Minister of Belarus then reports to the Defense Minister on the status of the parade. Following the report, to the tune of the Central Band of the Armed Forces of the Republic of Belarus playing inspection tunes, both the parade commander and the Defense Minister then review the parade mounted in their vehicles and the Minister, once the vehicles stop upon each company of troops assembled, then congratulates them on the holiday. After this, the defense minister's car heads to the central tribune to the tune of Motherland My Dear (Радзіма мая дарагая) so that the minister can report to the president on the readiness of the parade once his limousine stops in front of the presidential grandstand, following which he disembarks and arrives there, following which the parade is ordered at ease. The president then delivers an address to the nation and congratulates the citizens on the holiday. At the end of the speech, My, belorusy is played by the Central Band of the Armed Forces, with a 21-gun salute being fired in the background. The commander of the parade then gives the order for the Minsk Garrison to commence the parade while at the same time the linemen take their places to mark the distance of the troops marching past.

The order now concluded, the parade then marches off in quick time with the drummers of the Corps of Drums of the Minsk Suvorov Military School setting the pace. As the Corps' bandmaster orders the halt, the massed bands start playing a military march (usually Letter from the 45th by Igor Luchenko as the first song) as he salutes while the drummers swing on the eyes right position. The drummers are just the first of the large ground column of an estimated 2,900 service personnel that marches past the presidential grandstand. There are generally 10 officers and around 140 conscripts in each formation. At the end of the ground columns, the massed bands play Den Pobedy by David Tukhmanov before sounding off to The Sacred War as the mobile column passes through. The exhibition drill at the end of the parade, performed by the Honor Guard of the Armed Forces of Belarus has been held annually since 2002 and shows off the military drill of the armed forces. Following the drill routine, the massed bands sing Our Fatherland's Flag (Айчыны нашай сцяг) before marching off the avenue, officially closing the parade.

=== Annual and guest participants in the Parade ===
==== Massed Bands ====
- Massed Bands of the Minsk Garrison
  - Fanfare Trumpeter Team from the Minsk Suvorov Military School
  - Exemplary Military Band
  - Band of the Military Academy of Belarus
  - Band of the Guard of Honor
  - Exemplary Band of the Ministry of Internal Affairs
  - Minsk GUVD Brass Band

==== Ground Column ====
- Corps of Drums of the Minsk Suvorov Military School
- Cadets from specialized military high schools (25 from the MES, 30 from the MVD and 50 from the army)
- Color guard carrying the Flag of Belarus, the Flag of the USSR, the Victory Banner, and the banners of the 1st Belarusian Front, the 2nd Belarusian Front, the 3rd Belarusian Front and the 1st Baltic Front.
- Historical Troops
  - Cadets from the Military Academy dressed in Red Army uniforms
  - Descendants of Belarusian Partisan Formations
- Faculties of the Military Academy of Belarus
- Cadets of the Military Faculty of the Belarusian National Technical University
- Belarusian Ground Forces
  - 120th Guards Mechanised Brigade
  - 11th Guards Berlin-Carpathian Mechanized Brigade
- Belarusian Air Force Servicemen and Cadets
- Battalion of Female Servicemen of the Armed Forces
- State Border Committee Training Institute
- Personnel of the Ministry of Internal Affairs
  - Combined Police and OMON Unit
  - Battalion of Female Policewomen of the Police (recruited from police agencies such as the Minsk City Police Department)
  - Cadets of the Internal Troops College of the Military Academy of Belarus
  - 3rd Separate Special-Purpose Brigade
- University of Civil Protection of the Ministry of Emergency Situations
- Territorial Defense of the Armed Forces
- 38th Guards Air Assault Brigade
- 103rd Guards Airborne Division
- 5th Spetsnaz Brigade

The Honor Guard of the Armed Forces of Belarus also participates in the parade and the end as part of a finale, instead of the ground column.

==== Mobile column ====
The T-34 tank generally leads the procession of military vehicles and technologies. It is also responsible for setting the pace for the mechanized column at the parade. Its symbolism lies in the fact that it was the first vehicle to take part in the liberation of Minsk. Since 2016, Dmitry Frolikov has been responsible for leading the column on this tank. Around 300 units are presented at the parade.

==== Foreign contingents since 2011 ====
- PLA Honour Guard (China, 2018, 2019, 2024)
- 234th Air Assault Regiment, 76th Guards Air Assault Division (Russia, 2011–2016, 2018)
- 275th Self-Propelled Artillery Regiment, 4th Guards Tank Division (Russia, 2019)
- Color Guard of the Azerbaijani Land Forces (Azerbaijan, 2019, 2024)
- Armenian Honour Guard Color Guard (Armenia, 2019)
- Color Guard of the Honor Guard Company of the Ministry of Defense of Kazakhstan (Kazakhstan, 2019, 2024)
- Color Guard of the National Guard of Kyrgyzstan (Kyrgyzstan, 2019, 2024)
- Color Guard of the Honour Guard Company of the Ministry of Defense of Tajikistan (Tajikistan, 2019, 2024)
- Color Guard of the Honour Guard Company of the Ministry of Defense of Uzbekistan (Uzbekistan, 2019, 2024)

== List of parades ==
=== 1997 ===
Celebrated the 6th anniversary of independence. It was the first independence day parade in the Republic of Belarus. Nearly 4,000 soldiers and officers marched through Independence Square, accompanied by 100 combat vehicles.

=== 2001 ===
The parade in 2001 celebrated a decade of independence. It was the last to be held on Independence Square.

=== 2002 ===
Celebrated the 11th anniversary of independence. It was the first parade that took place on October Square since 1984. It was also the first time the Honor Guard of the Armed Forces of Belarus performed an exhibition drill at an independence day parade.

=== 2004 ===
It celebrated the 13th anniversary of independence and the 60th anniversary of the liberation of Belarus. It was held at its current venue for the first time. It saw the participation of some 3,000 troops, an air show involving more than 40 civilian and military helicopters and aircraft (including a recently leased Boeing 737) as well as tractors and trucks carrying household appliances, refrigerators and television sets. President Lukashenko gave his first appearance in a military uniform, which drew comparisons to Soviet leader Leonid Brezhnev, whose military uniform was that of a Marshal of the Soviet Union. Among the dignitaries in attendance was Mayor of Moscow Yuri Luzhkov, Secretary-General of the Collective Security Treaty Organization Nikolai Bordyuzha, State Secretary of the Union State Pavel Borodin, Chairman of the CIS Executive Committee Vladimir Rushailo, Nobel laureate Zhores Alferov, cosmonaut Valentina Tereshkova. Kazakh Army General and former Defence Minister of Kazakhstan Sagadat Nurmagambetov, Ukrainian General of the Army and war veteran Ivan Herasymov as well as a representative delegation of French Normandie-Niemen Fighter Regiment veterans.

=== 2009 ===
Celebrated the 18th anniversary of independence and the 65th anniversary of the liberation of Belarus. Nine UAZ-469 vehicles carrying war veterans took part in the parade. The parade included more than 40 military aircraft and 160 military vehicles.

=== 2013 ===
Celebrated the 22nd anniversary of independence. More than 20 military aircraft roared overhead, as well a 3,000 servicemen took part in the parade. Attending the parade were the Presidents of Venezuela and Laos, Nicolas Maduro and Choummaly Sayasone, respectively.

=== 2014 ===
Celebrated the 23rd anniversary of independence and the 70th anniversary of the liberation of Belarus. For the first time the parade was held in the evening at nine o'clock in the evening. It was also the first to conduct the aviation portion the parade first before the infantry or mobile column passes through. Belarusian soldiers dressed up as Soviet partisans marched down the avenue during the parade.

=== 2016 ===
Celebrated the 25th anniversary of independence. It was commanded by Sergei Potapenko and included about 6,000 people and 500 vehicles, featuring the planes such as the MI-24, Yak-130 combat aircraft, and MIG-29 in the flyover. According to the Interior Ministry, over 350,000 residents of the city either took part in the military parade, the artistic show that followed or observed the parade. It was the first independence day parade to use the Chinese made Hongqi L5 as the inspection vehicle since the car's introduction in May 2015.

=== 2017 ===
Military academy cadets

Celebrated the 26th anniversary of independence. The mechanized column included T-72B combat tanks, BMP-2 infantry combat vehicles, BTR-80 armoured personnel carriers, and the Polonez Rocket Systems. On 26 June, a tank that took part in that day's dress rehearsal crashed into a tree and knocked down a lamppost in Independence Avenue in Minsk. Belarusian tractors performed a ballet after the official parade. Breaking with a 5-year precedent, the military did not invite paratroopers from the Russian 76th Guards Air Assault Division to participate in the parade. Although no official reason was given, many have speculated that the division's involvement in the 2014 Annexation of Crimea by the Russian Federation and the ongoing involvement in the War in Donbas may have been a factor. Russia was instead represented by the Commander of the Russian Airborne Forces, Colonel General Andrey Serdyukov.

=== 2018 ===
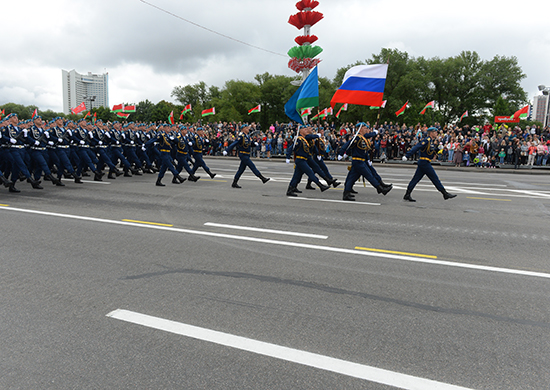
Russian troops during the 2018 parade

Celebrated the 27th anniversary of independence as well as the 100th anniversary of the founding of the Belarusian Army. The parade included female cadets for the first time. Troops from the Chinese PLA Honour Guard took part in the parade for the first time with Russian troops making a return appearance. Belarus's Bogomol and Centaur unmanned ground systems also made their debut appearance at the parade. In commemoration of the 80th anniversary of the Minsk Suvorov Military School, a section of cadets from the school took part in the parade alongside the school's Corps of Drums as part of a full contingent of junior cadets from specialized lyceums of the Emergencies Ministry, the MVD and the armed forces. 175 female cadets took part in the procession for the first time, including a cadet at the Military Academy who marched in the parade barefooted.

=== 2019 ===
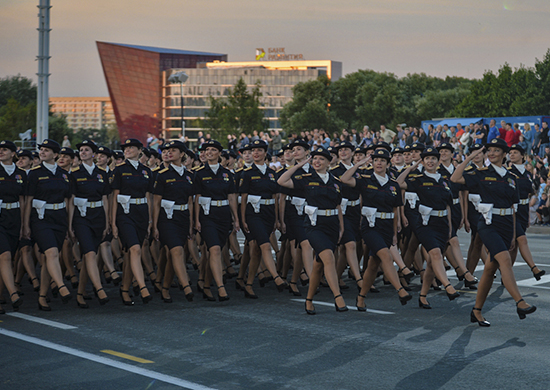
Female Belarusian policewomen

Celebrated the 28th anniversary of independence as well as the 75th anniversary of the liberation of Belarus. Unlike previous parades which may have included one or two foreign contingents, this parade included the color guards and full formations from eight different countries, including China and Azerbaijan. An elite armoured division from the Russian Ground Forces represented the Russian Armed Forces in the parade instead of the usual contingent from the airborne troops. In attendance was Azerbaijani defense minister Zakir Hasanov, Commander of the Russian Western Military District Viktor Astapov, and Uzbek army chief Pavel Ergashev. Keeping in tradition with the last jubilee parade in 2014, this parade took place in the evening time. For the first time, policewomen of the Ministry of Internal Affairs took part in the parade.

New and/or upgraded military hardware comprised about 70 percent of mechanized vehicles in the parade. Russian hardware including the 9K720 Iskander were on display. During his annual speech, President Lukashenko underscored his military policy by saying that the armed forces will find "new ways and methods of establishing relationships between various geopolitical forces".

=== 2021-2023 ===
For the first time in 22 years, there was no military parade on 3 July.

=== 2024 ===
Celebrated the 33rd anniversary of independence as well as the 80th anniversary of the liberation of Belarus. The parade included units from Azerbaijan, China, Kyrgyzstan, Kazakhstan, Russia, Tajikistan and Uzbekistan. For the first time, the procession of the flag of Belarus was held before the inspection of troops without the Flag of the USSR and the Victory Banner, which were not present in the parade procession, apart from new military equipment such as the S-400 missile systems were displayed. The parade was led by Major General Andrey Zhuk.

== Particularities ==
- In the 1990s, the parade was held and conducted in the Belarusian language and was transmitted by means of one state television channel. This changed in the 2000s when the language that was used was Russian, and therefore could be expanded to all major channels. At the same time, it was also expanded to Russian language channels in the European Union.
- Since the beginning, the parade has been followed by a Soviet-era traditional march of gymnasts, sportsmen and dancers.
- The president has traditionally wears the commander in chief's uniform during the parade.
- Every five years, reenactors dressed in the uniforms of Soviet partisans take part in the historical part of the parade. Both the uniforms and the weapons are provided by the Belarusfilm studio. This was done at the 2014 and 2019 jubilee parade editions was done for the first time in 2020 for the Victory Day Parade.

== Gallery ==
Defence Minister Ravkov being received by Deputy Defence Minister Sergei Potapenko.

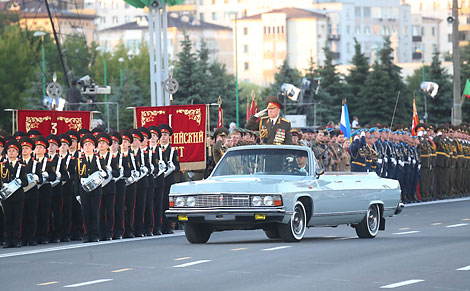
Major General Mikhail Puzikov during the 2014 jubilee parade.

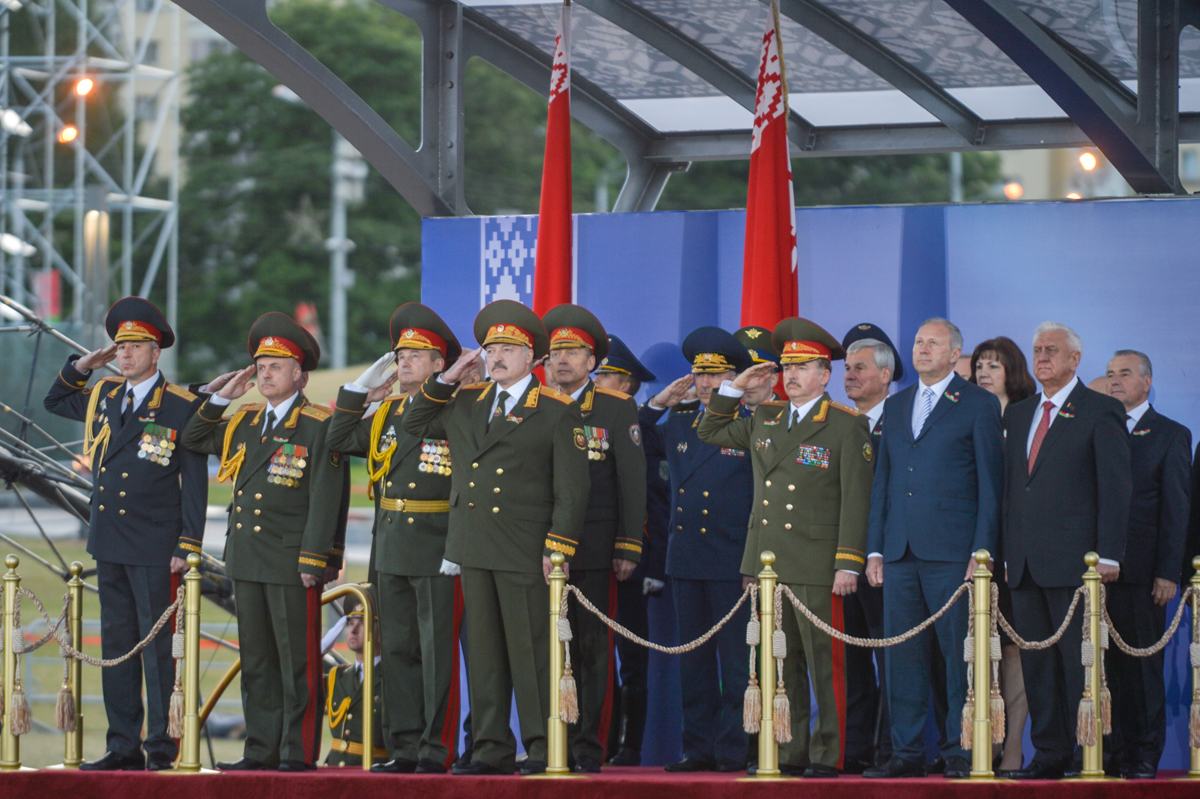
Members of the Belarusian military leadership led by Alexander Lukashenko saluting during the 2019 parade.

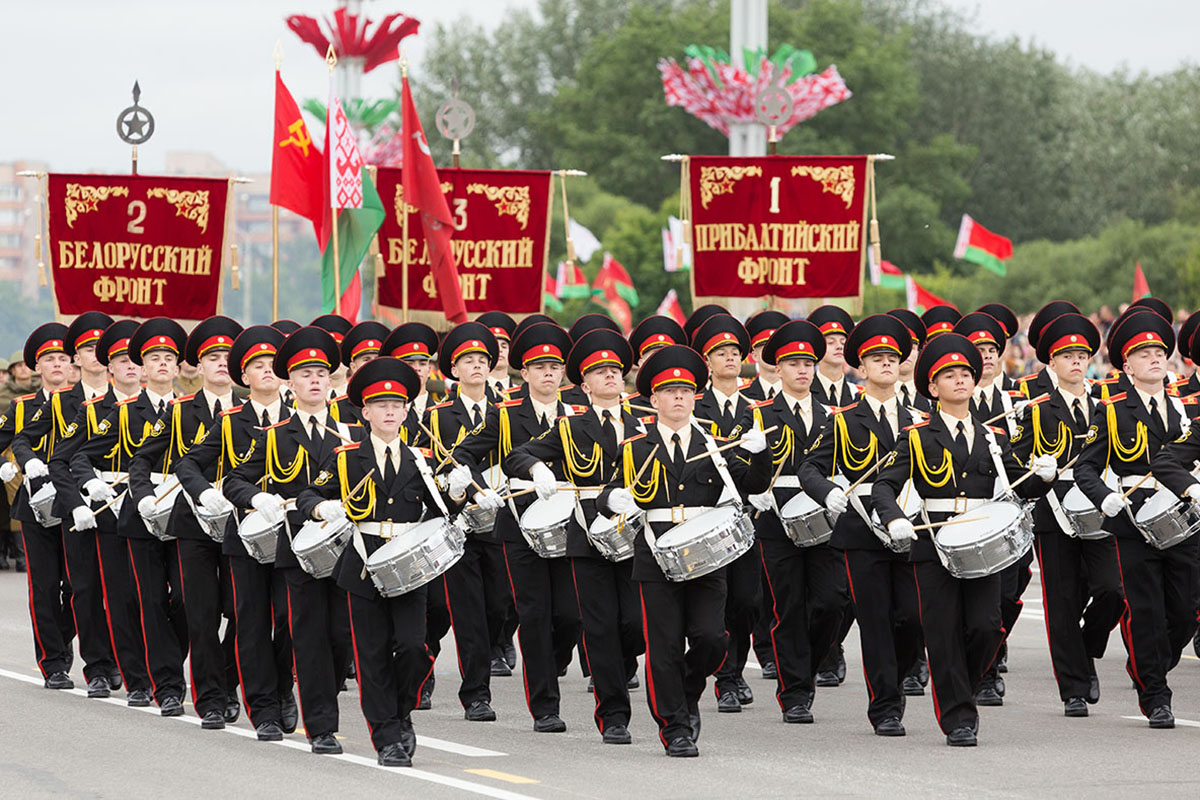
Drummers from the Minsk Suvorov Military School.

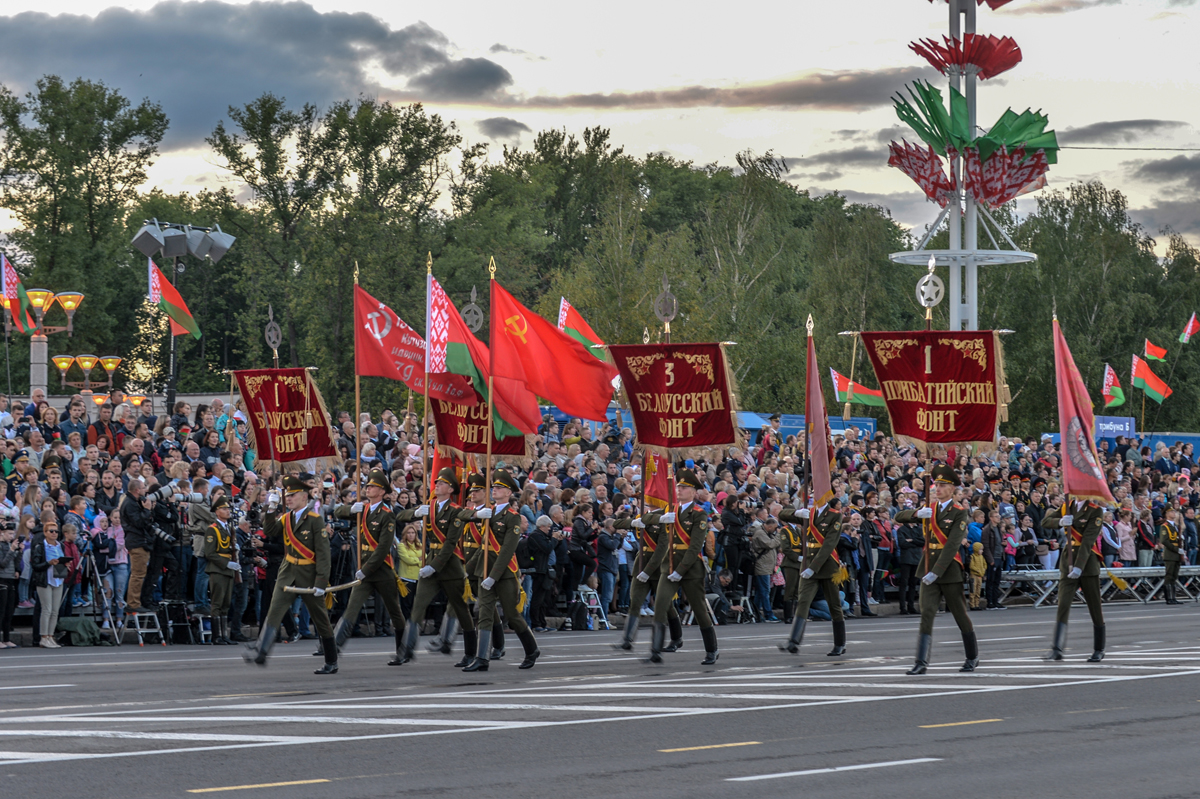
A massed color guard.

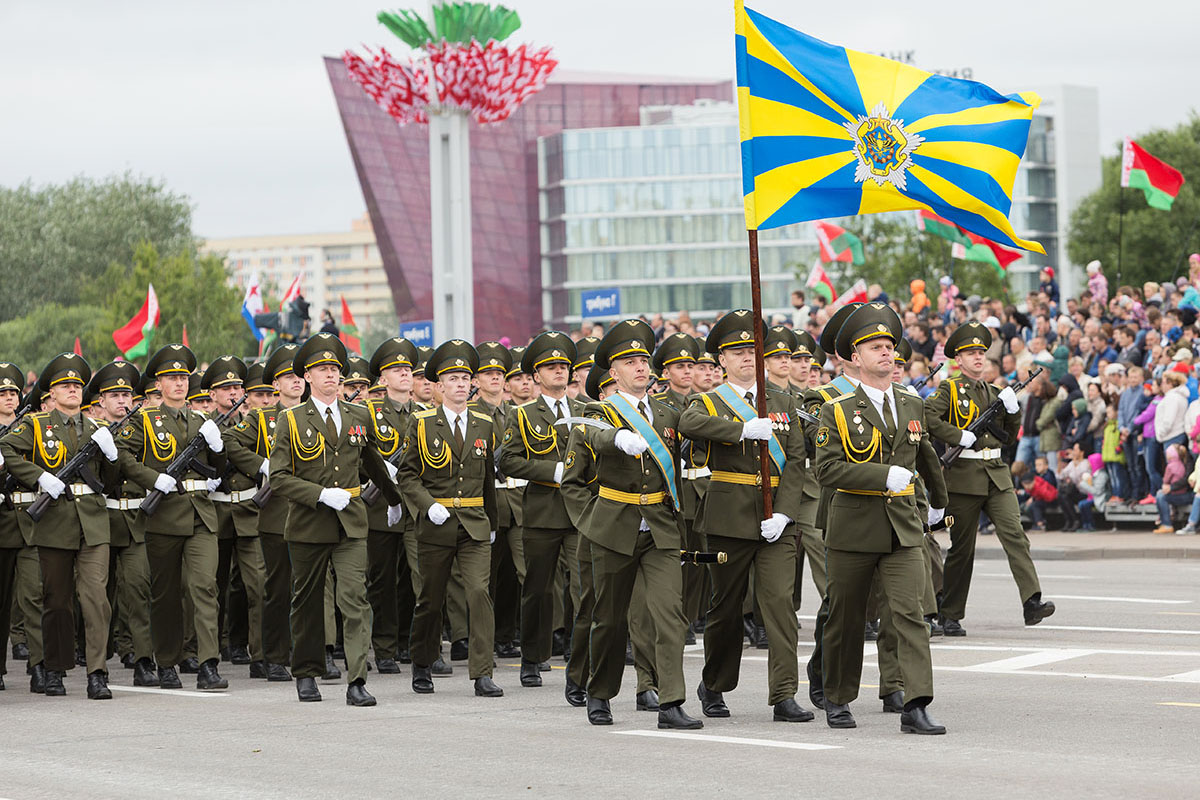
A Belarusian Air Force contingent.

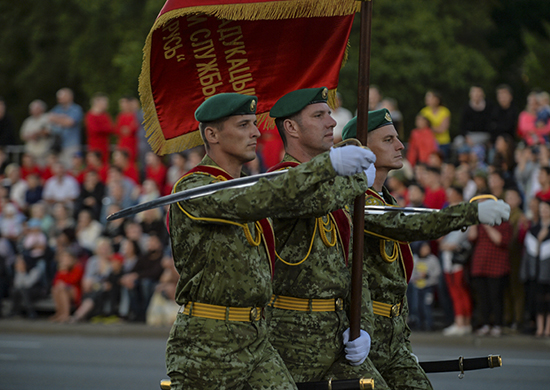
A color guard from the Border Guard Service Institute in the 2019 parade.

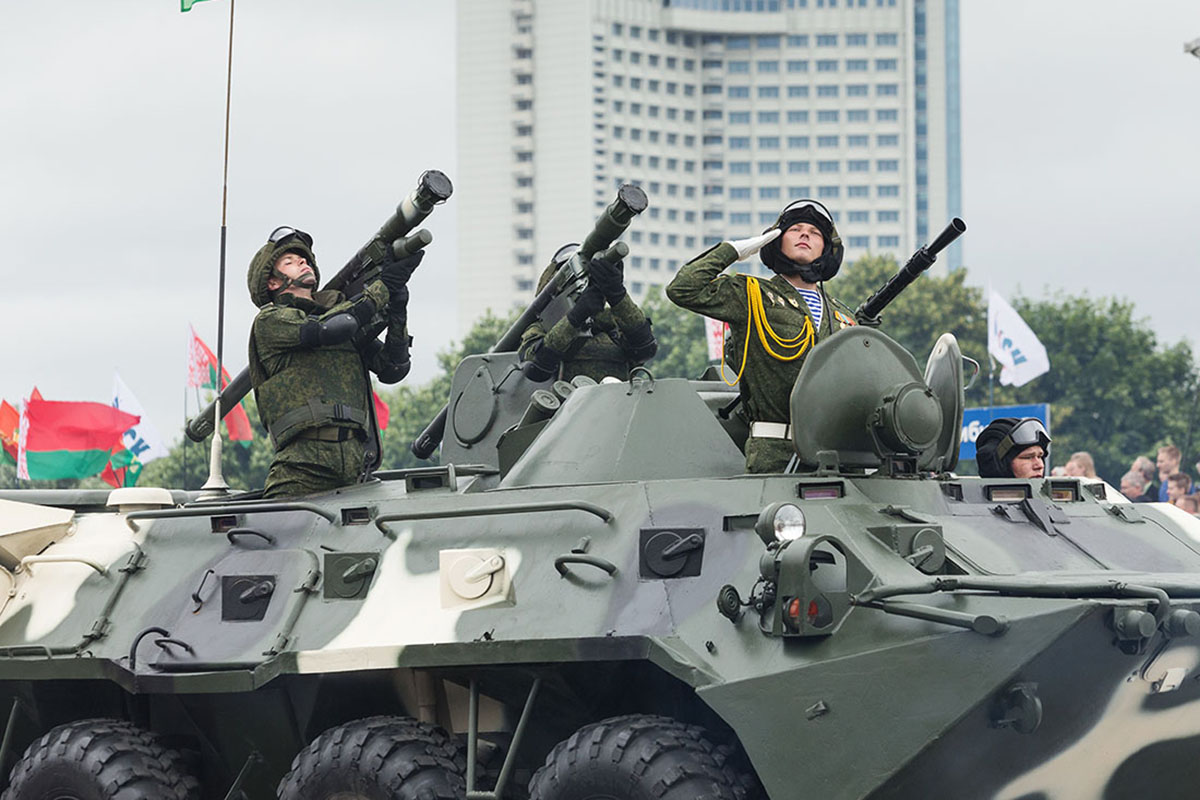
A Belarusian infantry fighting vehicle.

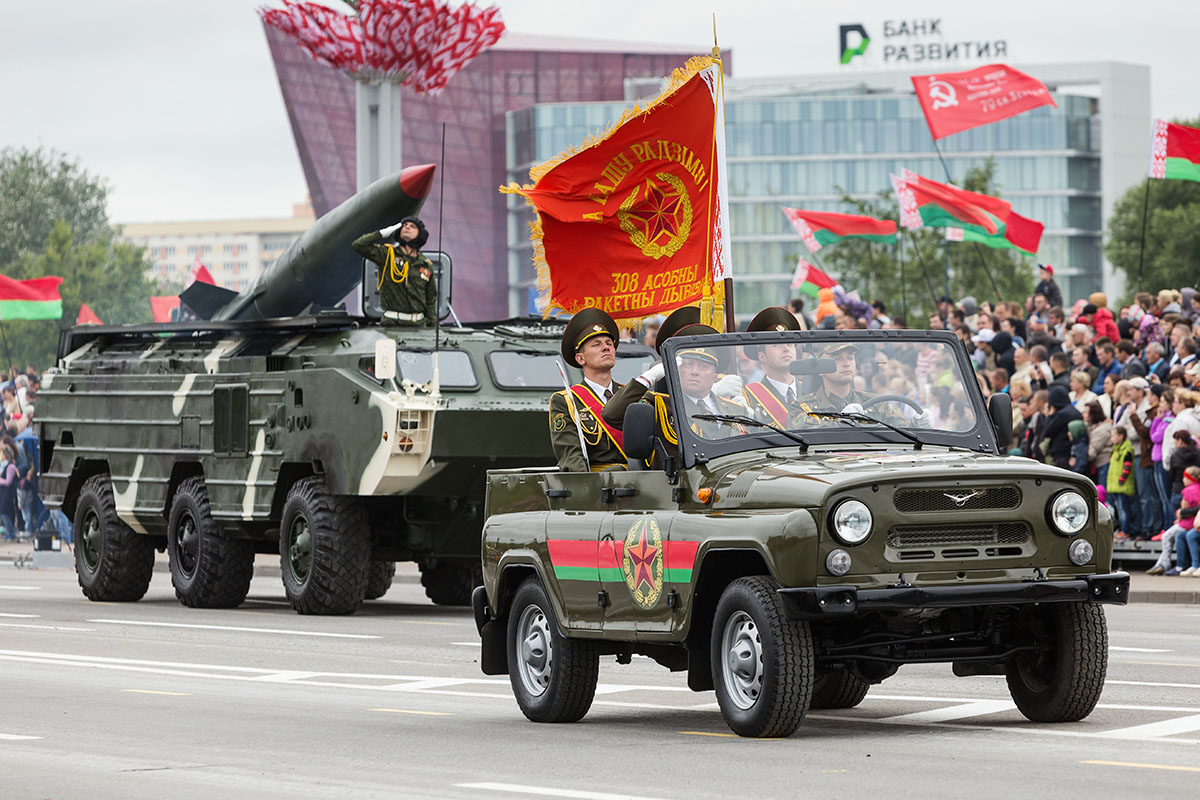
An armoured commander leading the contingent in an UAZ-469.

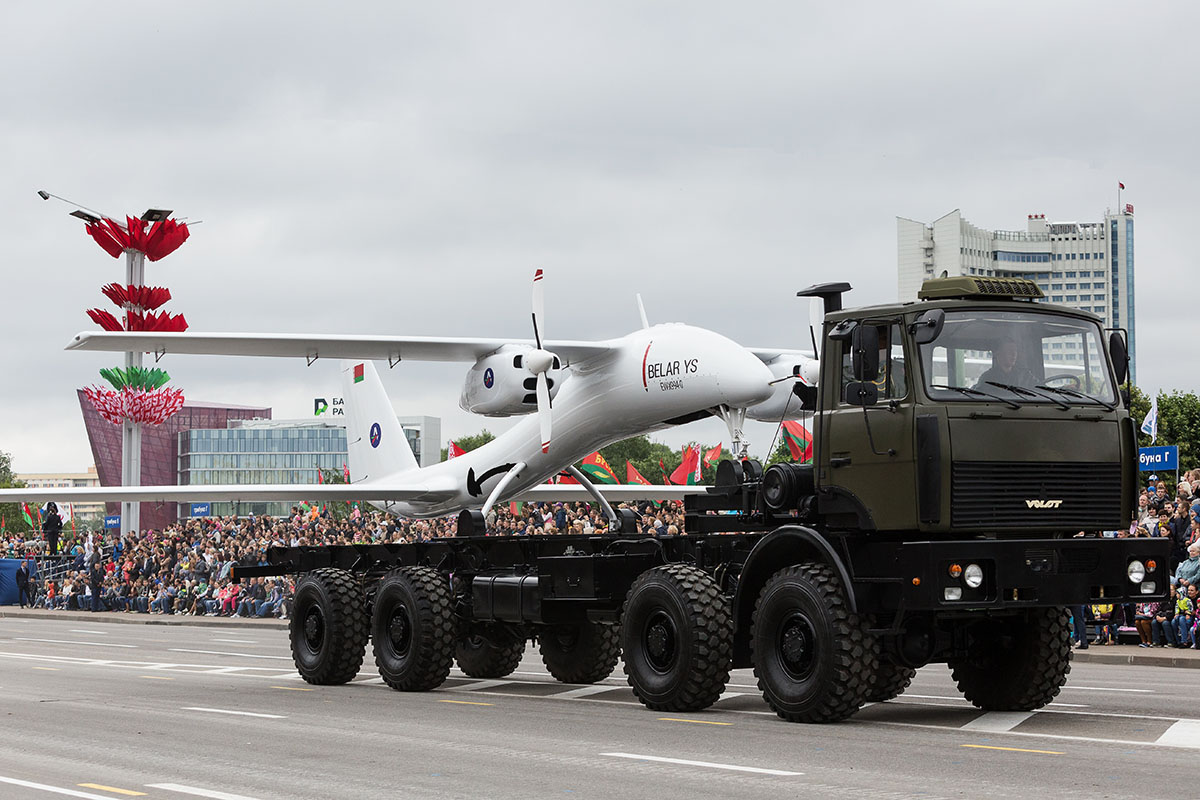
A military drone being carried by an offroad vehicle from MZKT.

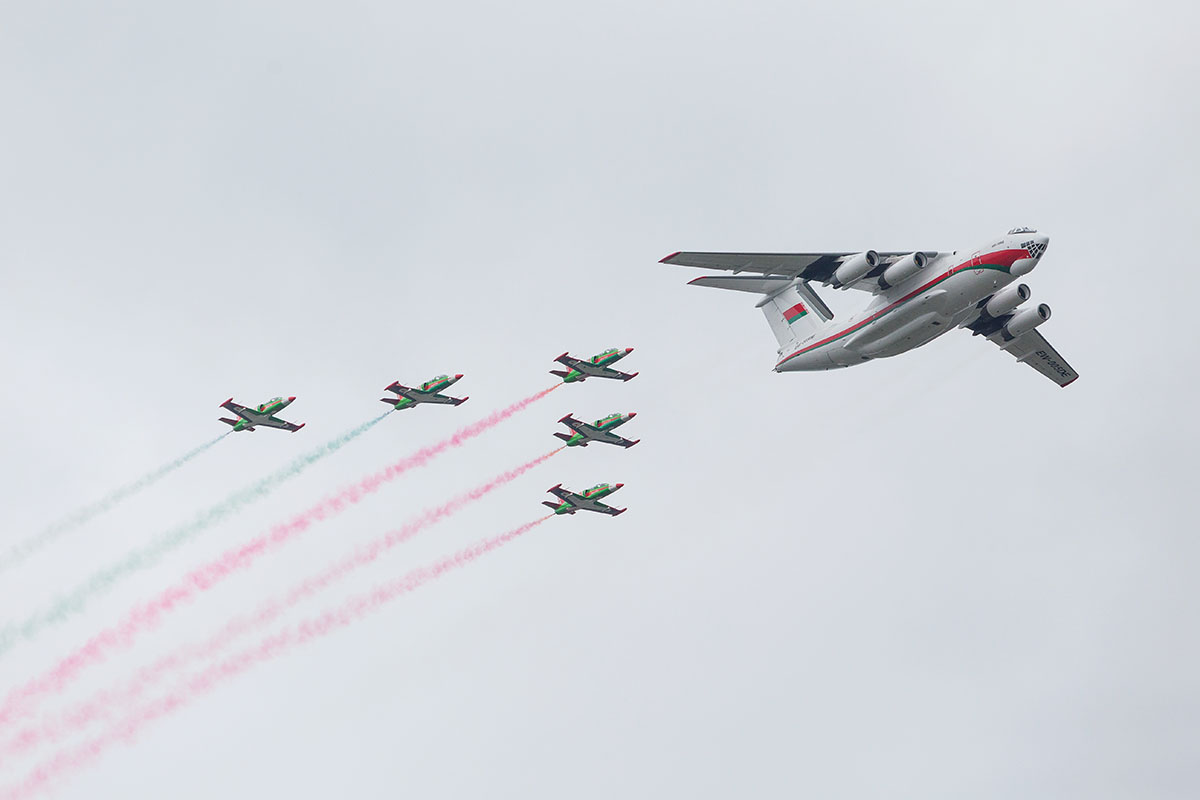
A flypast by the Air Force.

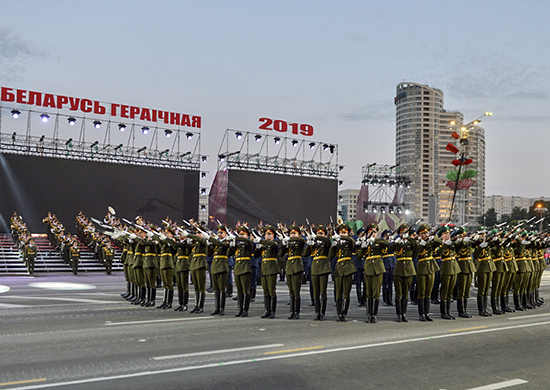
An exhibition drill routine.

== See also ==
- Partisans Parade
- List of Victory Day Parades in Minsk
- Kyiv Independence Day Parade
- Moscow Victory Day Parade
