= Sergei Potapenko =

Belarusian military leader

- Сяргей Патапенка; Сергей Потапенко

Chairman of the Belarusian Trade Union of Workers of State and Other Institutions
- Incumbent
- Assumed office March 2021

Deputy Defense Minister of Belarus
- In office 12 January 2016 – March 2021
- President: Alexander Lukashenko
- Preceded by: Mikhail Puzikov
- Succeeded by: Andrey Zhuk

Personal details
- Born: 14 March 1961 (age 65) Rzhavka, Minsk, Belarusian SSR, Soviet Union

Military service
- Allegiance: Soviet Union; Belarus
- Years of service: 1982-present
- Rank: Major General (Reserve)

Sergey Vladimirovich Potapenko (Belarusian: Сяргей Уладзіміравіч Патапенка, Siargiej Uladzimiravič Patapienka) is a Belarusian military leader and the current Chairman of the Belarusian Trade Union of Workers of State and Other Institutions.

== Biography ==
He was born on 14 March 1961 in Rzhavka, a section of the Minsk region of the Byelorussian SSR, which is modern-day Belarus. In 1978, he graduated from the Minsk Suvorov Military School. In 1982, he graduated from the Ulyanovsk Guards Higher Tank Command School. He served as a commander of a tank platoon. He graduated from the Malinovsky Military Armoured Forces Academy in 1992. He worked for the 72nd Guards Joint Training Centre on several staff positions and rose through the ranks from being a senior officer of the training division to the head of the training centre.

In 2008, Potapenko was appointed deputy commander of the North-Western Operational Command. He also commanded the Western Operational Command from 2010 to 2015.

From June 2015, he served as the head of the Main Combat Training Directorate of the Belarusian Armed Forces. On 12 January 2016, Potapenko was appointed Deputy Minister of Defence by order of a presidential decree. He was put under sanctions by Lithuania over his role in suppressing the 2020 Belarusian protests. He was put in the reserves in March 2021.
