= Military Band Service of the Armed Forces of the Republic of Belarus =

Military band service of the Ministry of Defence of Belarus

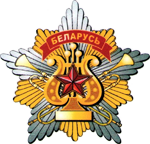
- The logo of the band.
- Active: 1 April 1950; 76 years ago
- Country: Belarus
- Branch: Armed Forces of Belarus
- Type: Military Band Department
- Size: 70 musicians at least
- Garrison/HQ: Building 1A, 21 Kuleshova Street, Minsk
- Nickname: BelArmyBand

Commanders
- Senior Director of Music/Commander: Colonel Igor Khlebus
- Director of Music: Colonel Maxim Kochetkov
- Deputy Commander and Bandmaster: Major Andrey Petrovich

Insignia
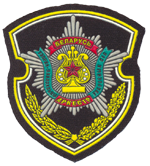
- Shoulder Patch

The Military Band Service of the Armed Forces of the Republic of Belarus (Note: Belarusian: Ваенна-аркестравая служба Узброеных Сіл Рэспублікі Беларусь, romanized: Vayenna-arkyestravaya sluzhba Uzbroyenykh Sil Respubliki Byelarus; Russian: Военно-оркестровая служба Вооруженных Сил Республики Беларусь, romanized: Voyenno-orkestrovaya sluzhba Vooruzhennykh Sil Respubliki Belarus) is the central military band service of the Armed Forces of Belarus. The band was formed on 1 April 1950 as the Band of the Belorussian Military District. It was expanded into a service in the 1990s after the Independence of Belarus occurred. Its bands participate in military parades, military tattoos, and official ceremonies of Belarus. They perform domestically, regularly performing in the Central Officers House in Minsk, as well as other garrison clubs. The massed bands of the Minsk Garrison is an annual participant in the parades of the Minsk Garrison on Victors Avenue since 2004. The repertoire of the band includes more than 500 compositions of the most important classical music composers and contemporary ones. Bands have performed in festivals in Great Britain, Ireland, Germany, France, Poland, Sweden, and Russia. The band has also played in the Spasskaya Tower military tattoo in 2013, 2016, and 2017. The band is commanded by its Senior Director of Music/Chief Conductor, Lieutenant Colonel Igor Khlebus, since 2019. The artistic director of the band is Colonel Evgueny Dovzhik.

== Structure of the Service ==
"My Belarusy"
"My Belarusy", performed here by the Central Band of the Armed Forces of the Republic of Belarus in March 2017.

As a grouping of military bands of the armed services of the republic the Military Band Service of the Armed Forces is composed of the following flagship units and other formations:

=== Exemplary Military Band ===
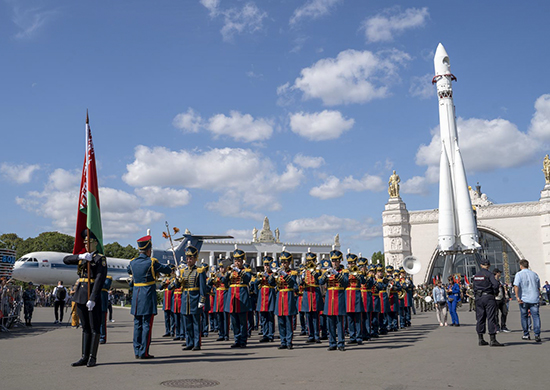
The band in traditional uniforms during a visit to Moscow (2019).

The Exemplary Military Band (also known as the Central Band of the Armed Forces), is the senior-most military unit in the service. It was founded on the basis of the Staff Band of the Belorussian Military District, which itself was founded on 1 April 1950. On 13 August 2003, the band gained the honorary title of "Honored Collective of the Republic of Belarus".

=== Band of the Guard of Honor ===
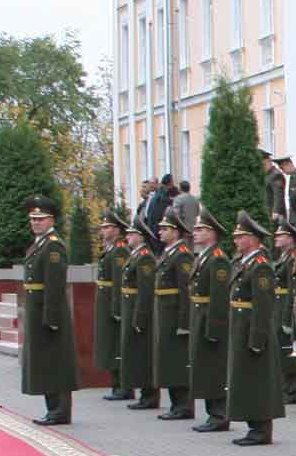
Band of the Honor Guard Company at the Ministry of Defence.

The Band of the Honor Guard Company of the Minsk Military Commandant of the Armed Forces of Belarus was founded on July 1, 1995, as the Military Band of the Minsk Garrison's Office. Since 2018, the band has used chromatic fanfare trumpets in its ranks. For 21 years until 2016, the commander of the orchestra was Sergey Kostiuchenko. It works alongside the honor guard company in taking part in ceremonies in Belarus and abroad. The orchestra's repertoire is based on Belarusian, Russian and foreign music.

The following have served as directors of the Band of the Honor Guard:

- Lieutenant Colonel Igor Khelbus (1993–1995)
- Lieutenant Colonel Sergey Kostiuchenko (1995–2005)
- Major Aleksandr Kantsyal (2016–present)

=== Cadet Bands ===
Cadet bands affiliated to the Band Service of the Armed Forces are drawn from military academies of the armed forces and ministries of the state.

- Band of the Military Academy of Belarus
- Band of the Minsk Suvorov Military School

=== Regional Bands ===
Together with the component bands of the MBSAFRB and the cadet bands of the Armed Forces, the regional bands from each of the military commandants are also components of the Band Service and are affiliated to the senior bands in Minsk. The bands of the regional departments of the Ministry of Internal Affairs, while not being part of the Band Service, are also affiliated to it as well.

- Band of the Baranavichy Military Commandant
- Band of the Babruysk Military Commandant
- Band of the Barysaw Military Commandant
- Band of the Brest Military Commandant – Created on 3 August 2001 under the direction of Alexander Nosov, the band jas been led by Lieutenant Colonel Sergey Minich since 2007.
- Band of the Grodno Military Commandant
- Band of the Minsk Military Commandant
- Band of the Vitebsk Military Commandant

=== Unit Bands ===
In addition to the baseline military bands, it maintains additional active-duty field bands that are assigned to an active duty unit, usually the size of a regiment/brigade, following the Russian tradition. These unit bands include but are not limited to:

- Band of the 103rd Guards Airborne Brigade – Founded in 1945 on the basis of the 317th Airborne Regiment of the 103rd Airborne Division. In 2005, it became part of the Vitebsk Military Commandant's Office and since 2014 has been part of the 103rd Separate Guards Airborne Brigade.
- Band of the 102nd Separate Guards Mechanized Brigade
- Band of the 5th Spetsnaz Brigade
- Band of the 6th Separate Guards Mechanized Brigade (Grodno)
- Band of the 11th Guards Berlin-Carpathian Mechanized Brigade
- Band of the 51st Guards Artillery Brigade
- Band of the 30th Separate Red Banner Railway Brigade (Band of the Belarusian Transport Troops)

== Bands of affiliated militarized formations ==
=== Exemplary Band of the Ministry of Internal Affairs ===
The Exemplary Band of the Ministry of Internal Affairs was founded on 20 July 1945 as a military band of the 21st Motorized Rifle Detachment of the Ministry of State Security of the USSR. On 28 April 1995, the band was re-branded as the band of the Ministry of Internal Affairs of the Republic of Belarus. Its first concert in its new capacity took place on the Day of the Militia parade on 4 March 1995 at October Square. It is currently led by Lieutenant Colonel Alexander Kalinin. It is also part of the Military Band Service of Internal Troops of Belarus.

=== Other bands of the MUS ===
- Band of the Academy of the Ministry of Internal Affairs
- Band of the 6th Separate Special-Police Brigade

=== Ensemble of the Border Guard Service ===
The Ensemble of the Border Guard Service is the official band supporting the everyday ceremonial activities of the Border Guard Service of Belarus, which reports to the State Border Committee of the Republic of Belarus, rather than to the Ministry of Defense. It falls under the jurisdiction of the Border Guard Service Institute of Belarus, being an artistic ensemble for the institute. It is currently led by Captain Pavel Pashkin.

=== Bands of the Ministry of Emergency Situations ===
The Band of the Ministry of Emergency Situations is the official band supporting the everyday ceremonial activities of the Ministry of Emergency Situations. It is an affiliated military brass band composed 25 musicians who have an extensive touring experience (performing at military tattoos in Poland, Germany, Belgium and Denmark).

In 2014, the Military Band of the Grodno Regional Department of the Ministry of Emergency Situations took part in the 54th International Festival of Military Music in Belgium, being greeted personally by Belgian Prime Minister Elio Di Rupo.

== Other musical units in Belarus ==
- The Concert Group of the Air Force and Air Defence Forces
- Belarusian Armed Forces Academic Song and Dance Ensemble

== List of directors ==
Directors of the Exemplary Military Band:

- V. Shalygin – (1950–1952)
- I. Mironovich – (1952–1959)
- A. Mayzler (1959–1968)
- P. Chebanenko (1968–1974)
- B. Chudakov – (1974–1979)
- J. Kraokotin – (1979–1983)
- Mikhail Bersan – (1983–1990)
- Colonel Alexander Fedorov – (1990–2004)
- Colonel Vladimir Ermolaev – (2004–2008)
- Colonel Sergey Kostiuchenko – (2008–2019)
- Colonel Igor Khlebus – (2019–Present)

== See also ==
- Military Band Service of the Armed Forces of Russia
- Military Music Department of the General Staff of the Ukrainian Armed Forces
- Representative Central Band of the Polish Armed Forces
- Lithuanian Armed Forces Headquarters Band
- Central Military Band of the Latvian National Armed Forces
