= Ministry of Emergency Situations (Belarus) =

Government ministry of Belarus

- Міністэрства па надзвычайных сітуацыях Ministerstva pa nadzvyčajnych situacyjach
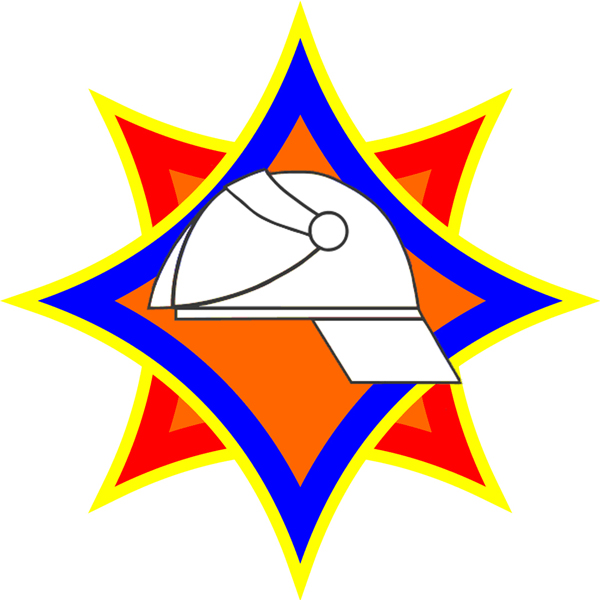
- Ministry Emblem

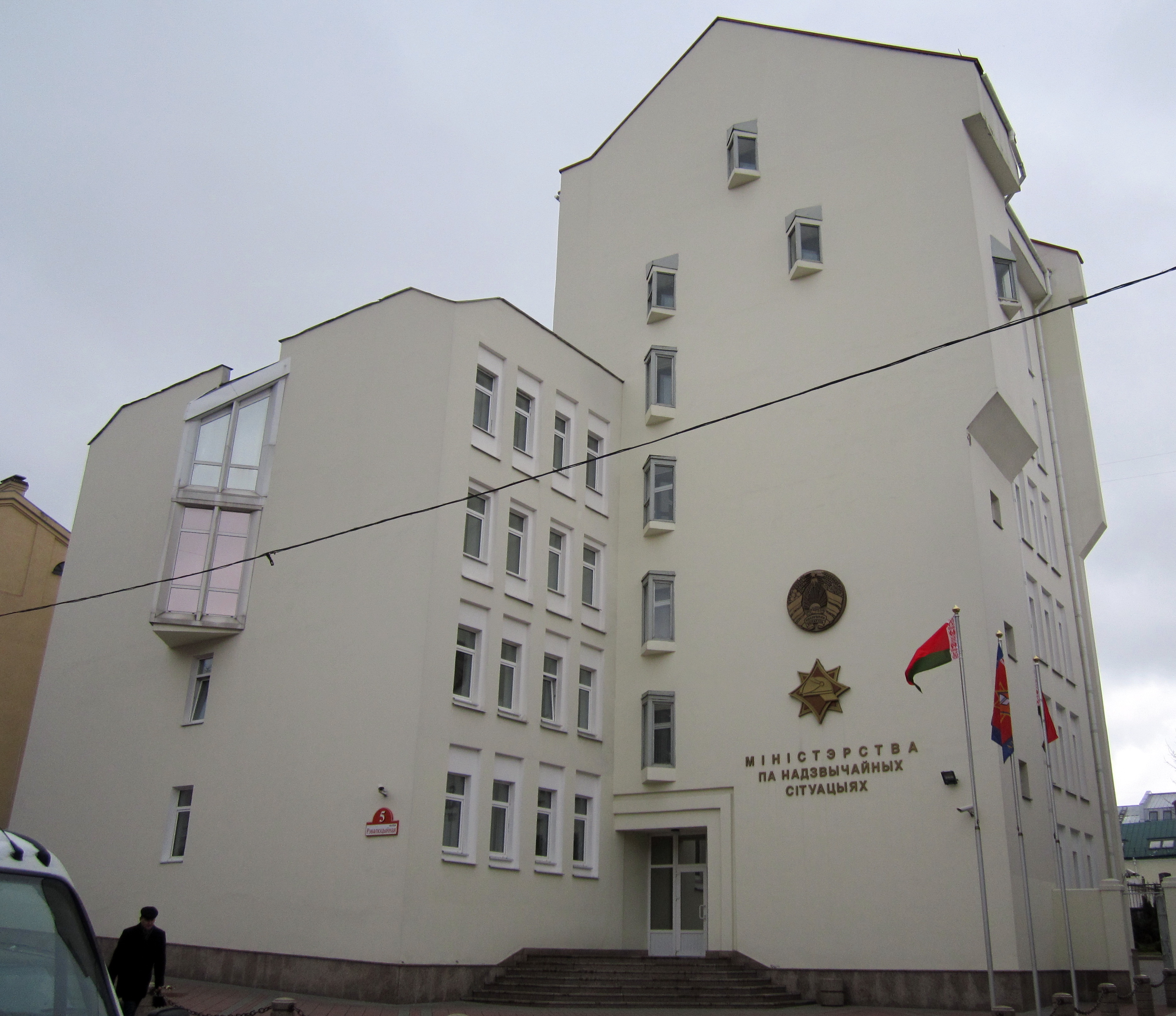
- Ministry headquarters

Agency overview
- Formed: September 23, 1994
- Jurisdiction: Council of Ministers of Belarus
- Headquarters: Revaliucyjnaja Street, Minsk
- Motto: За безопасность вместе (Security Together)
- Minister responsible: Vadim Sinyavsky, Minister of Emergency Situations
- Agency executives: Vasil Stsepanenka, First Deputy Minister; Alyaksandr Hancharou, Deputy Minister; Alyaksandr Khudaleyeu, Deputy Minister; Henadz Lasuta, Deputy Minister
- Website: mchs.gov.by

The Ministry of Emergency Situations of Belarus (Belarusian: Міністэрства па надзвычайных сітуацыях, romanized: Ministerstva pa nadzvyčajnych situacyjach) is a government agency overseeing emergency services in Belarus. It is responsible for protecting the Belarusian people during natural disasters. It is located on Revaliucyjnaja Street in Minsk. The Ministry for Emergency Situations was established in accordance a decree of President Alexander Lukashenko on September 23, 1994.

== Duties ==
The ministry performs the following duties:

- Control and management in the sphere of prevention and liquidation of emergency situations of natural and man-made disasters and civil defense
- Provide fire, industrial, nuclear and radiation safety
- Dealing with the consequences of the Chernobyl disaster
- The creation and preservation of state and mobilization material reserves
- Regulation in the field of safety of navigation of small vessels on inland waterways of Belarus

== Ministers ==
- Ivan Kenik (1994—1999)
- Valery Astapov (1999—2004)
- Enver Bariev (2004—2010)
- Uladzimir Vashchanka (2010—2021)
- Vadim Sinyavsky (2021—present)

== Structure ==
=== Apparatus ===
- Minister
- First Deputy Minister
- Deputy Ministers
  - Deputy Minister
  - Deputy Minister
  - Deputy Minister
- Assistant Minister - Spokesman
- General Directorate of the State System for Prevention and Elimination of Emergencies and Civil Protection
- Management of Emergency Services and Emergency Response
- Office Management and Enforcement
- Personnel Management
- Logistics Management
- Office of International Cooperation
- Management of Surveillance and Prevention
- Legal Support Management
- Management of Financial and Economic Work
- Department of Science and Innovation Development
- Operational Management Department
- Department of Organization of Public Education and Training
- Department of Regime-Secret Work
- Communication and Alerts Department
- Construction Department
- Sector of Ideological Work
- Mobilization Sector
- Security Sector

=== Territorial Directorates ===
- Brest Oblast Directorate
- Vitebsk Oblast Directorate
- Gomel Oblast Directorate
- Grodno Oblast Directorate
- Minsk Oblast Directorate
- Mogilev City Directorate
- Minsk City Directorate

=== Educational and scientific departments ===
- University of Civil Protection of the Ministry of Emergency Situations
- Research Institute of Fire Safety and Emergencies
- Lyceum at the Gomel Engineering Institute
- State Aviation Emergency Rescue Institution
- Republican Special Detachment
- Republican Center for Emergency Management and Response
- Republican Center for Certification and Examination of Licensed Activities
- Republican Logistics Center
- Republican Control and Revision Inspectorate
- Centralized Accounting

=== Subordinate government organizations ===
- Evacuation Administration
- Scientific Production Republican Unitary Enterprise "Security Emergency"
- Belinvestkamplekt Republican Unitary Enterprise
- Diekos Republican Unitary Enterprise
- Institute of Radiology
- Uniform Production
- Polesie Republican Unit
- Radon Specialized Unit
- Bellesavia Republican Unit
- Children's Rehabilitation and Wellness Center
- Zhdanovichi State Reserve
- Polesie State Radiation Ecological Reserve
- Protection Units

== See also ==
- Ministry of Emergency Situations (disambiguation)
- Armed Forces of Belarus
