= Pavel Mironov =

Pavel Vasilyevich Mironov
- Native name: Павел Васильевич Миронов
- Born: 21 September 1900; Vasilyevka village, Tambovsky Uyezd, Tambov Governorate, Russian Empire
- Died: 29 October 1969 (aged 69) Moscow, Soviet Union
- Buried: Novodevichy Cemetery
- Allegiance: Soviet Union
- Branch: Red Army
- Service years: 1919–1959
- Rank: Lieutenant general
- Commands: 107th Rifle Division; 5th Guards Rifle Division; 7th Guards Rifle Corps; 37th Guards Rifle Corps; 34th Guards Rifle Corps; 19th Rifle Corps
- Conflicts: Russian Civil War; World War II; Battle of Smolensk (1941); Rzhev-Vyazma Offensive; Battle of Smolensk (1943); Svir-Petrozavodsk Offensive; Vienna Offensive; Prague Offensive
- Awards: Hero of the Soviet Union; Order of Lenin (2); Order of the Red Banner (4); Order of Suvorov, 1st class; Order of Kutuzov, 2nd class; Order of the Red Star; Distinguished Service Order

Pavel Vasilyevich Mironov (Russian: Павел Васильевич Миронов; 21 September 1900 – 29 October 1969) was a Red Army lieutenant general and Hero of the Soviet Union. Mironov led the 37th Guards Rifle Corps during World War II.

== Early life ==
Mironov was born on 21 September 1900 in the village of Vasilyevka in Tambovsky Uyezd of Tambov Governorate to a peasant family. In 1912, Mironov graduated from the three classes of rural school and worked on a farm. During 1917 and 1918, he was the secretary for the village Committee of Poor Peasants and in January 1919 became the secretary for the local cells of the Communist Party of the Soviet Union. In November 1919, Mironov was drafted into the Red Army. He graduated from the Tambov command courses in 1920 and became the assistant commander and then a company commander of the Blagodarnenskogo Guard Battalion. Between March and August 1921, Mironov was the assistant commander and then a company commander of the 117th Rifle Regiment, fighting in battles in the Kuban and Stavropol.

== Interwar ==
Mironov graduated from the Vystrel Commander's Courses in 1922. In September, he became an assistant company commander in the 110th Rifle Regiment of the 37th Rifle Division. He became the assistant battalion commander in the 66th Rifle Regiment of the 22nd Rifle Division in August 1923. In September 1926, he became a battalion commander in the 222nd Rifle Regiment of the 74th Rifle Division. In 1927, he joined the Communist Party of the Soviet Union. Mironov was promoted in April 1931 to become the chief of staff of the 84th Mountain Rifle Regiment in the 28th Mountain Division. He became the chief of staff of the 282nd Rifle Regiment of the 94th Rifle Division in February 1932. In May, he became the chief of staff of the 82nd Mountain Rifle Regiment and became the regimental commander in 1934. Mironov was transferred to become the 28th Mountain Division's assistant commander in October 1938. In August 1939, he became the commander of the 107th Rifle Division. Mironov was sent to the Frunze Military Academy in November 1940 for commanders refresher courses.

== World War II ==
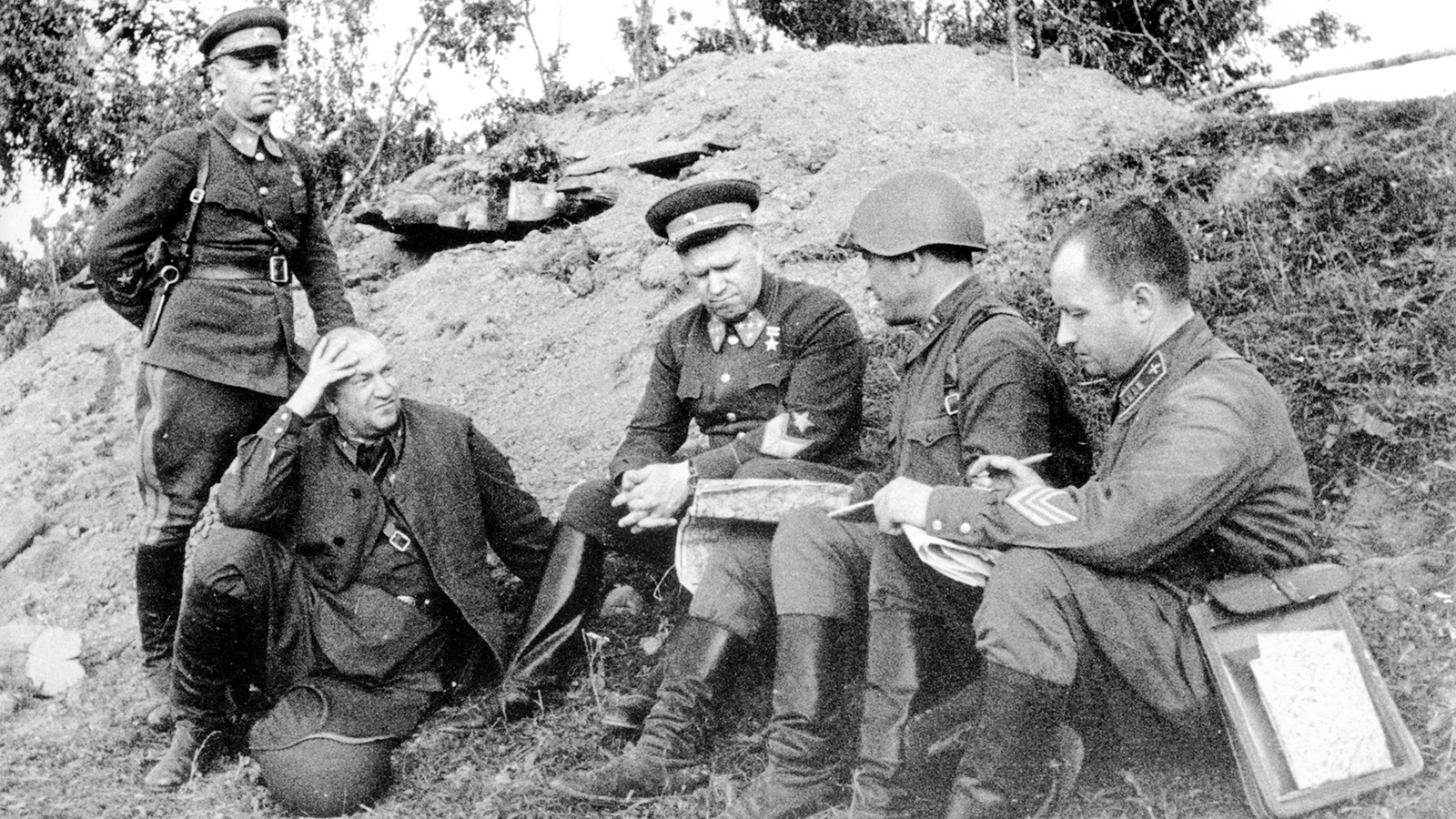
Mironov (in helmet) conversing with Georgy Zhukov, September 1941, during the Yelnya Offensive

After completing the courses in September 1941, Mironov returned to the 107th Rifle Division and led it during the Battle of Smolensk. On 26 September, the 107th became the 5th Guards Rifle Division for its actions during the Battle of Smolensk. He continued to lead the division during the Battle of Moscow, the Kaluga Offensive and the Rzhev-Vyazma Offensive. In April 1942, he became the commander of the 7th Guards Rifle Corps, which fought in the late stages of the Rzhev-Vyazma Offensive and the Battle of Smolensk in 1943. On 19 January 1944, Mironov became the commander of the 37th Guards Rifle Corps and was promoted to lieutenant general on 22 February. He led the corps in the Svir-Petrozavodsk Offensive, where it captured Olonets. In August, the corps was converted to an airborne unit but reconverted to infantry in December. In February 1945, the corps was sent to Budapest and fought in the Vienna Offensive and the Prague Offensive. On 28 April 1945, Mironov was awarded the title Hero of the Soviet Union for his leadership of the corps, as well as the Order of Lenin.

== Postwar ==
Mironov continued to command the 37th Guards Rifle Corps, which became part of the Central Group of Forces, until April 1946. In May, he was sent to study at the Military Academy of the General Staff, from which he graduated in 1947. In January of that year, he became the deputy commander of combat training for the Soviet airborne. In August 1948, Mironov was appointed commander of the 34th Guards Rifle Corps. Mironov became a senior lecturer at the Military Academy of the General Staff in December 1950. In November 1953, he became the commander of the 19th Rifle Corps. He transferred to the post of assistant commander for combat training of the Leningrad Military District in June 1955. In March 1958, Mironov became the head of the military department at the Moscow State University of Economics, Statistics, and Informatics. In April 1959, he retired. Mironov died on 29 October 1969 in Moscow and was buried at Novodevichy Cemetery.

== Honors and awards ==
Pavel Mironov received the following honors and awards:

=== Soviet ===
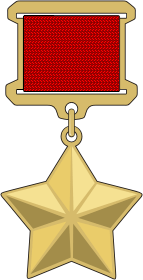
| Hero of the Soviet Union (28 April 1945) |
| Order of Lenin, twice (21 February 1945 and 28 April 1945) |
| Order of the Red Banner, four times (4 December 1942, 6 March 1944, 3 November 1944 and 15 November 1950) |
| Order of Suvorov, 1st class (21 July 1944) |
| Order of Kutuzov, 2nd class (28 September 1943) |
| Order of the Red Star (22 February 1941) |
| Medal "For the Defence of Moscow" |
| Medal "For the Victory over Germany in the Great Patriotic War 1941–1945" |
| Jubilee Medal "Twenty Years of Victory in the Great Patriotic War 1941–1945" |
| Medal "For the Capture of Vienna" |
| Jubilee Medal "XX Years of the Workers' and Peasants' Red Army" |
| Jubilee Medal "30 Years of the Soviet Army and Navy" |
| Jubilee Medal "40 Years of the Armed Forces of the USSR" |
| Jubilee Medal "50 Years of the Armed Forces of the USSR" |

=== Foreign ===
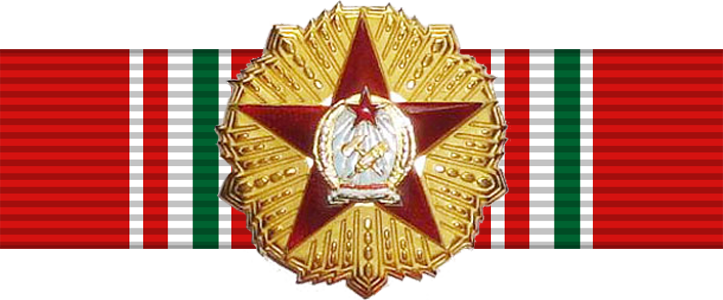
| Distinguished Service Order (May 1943) |
| Order of Merit of the Hungarian People's Republic, 1st class |
