= Nestor Kozin =

Soviet Army general (1902–1992)

Nestor Dmitriyevich Kozin
- Native name: Нестор Дмитриевич Козин
- Born: 28 October 1902; Burkovo-Pokrovskoye village, Kainskaya Uyezd, Tomsk Governorate, Russian Empire
- Died: 11 September 1992 (aged 89) Barnaul, Russia
- Allegiance: Soviet Union
- Branch: Soviet Army
- Service years: 1924–1954
- Rank: Major general
- Commands: 8th Motor Rifle Division NKVD; 63rd Rifle Division; 189th Rifle Division; 13th Guards Airborne Division; 52nd Guards Rifle Division
- Conflicts: World War II; Yelnya Offensive; Battle of Moscow; Battle of Stalingrad; Tartu Offensive; Riga Offensive; Vistula-Oder Offensive; Battle of Berlin
- Awards: Hero of the Soviet Union

Nestor Dmitriyevich Kozin (Russian: Нестор Дмитриевич Козин; 28 October 1902 – 11 September 1992) was a Soviet Army major general. After being drafted into the Red Army in 1924, Kozin became an officer and from 1939 was a battalion commander in the 107th Rifle Division. Kozin fought in the Yelnya Offensive after the 107th was moved west and became a regimental commander in the 100th Rifle Division in August 1941. After the end of the Yelnya Offensive in early September, Kozin was awarded the Order of Lenin for his leadership and the 100th Rifle Division became the 1st Guards Rifle Division. He then fought in the Battle of Moscow and in April 1942 was appointed commander of the 8th Motor Rifle Division NKVD. The division became the 63rd Rifle Division in June and fought in Operation Uranus. Kozin received the Order of Suvorov 2nd class and the division became the 52nd Guards Rifle Division for its actions in the offensive. The division continued to fight at Stalingrad and Kozin was wounded in January 1943. After recovery, he was sent to study at the Military Academy of the General Staff, where he remained until given command of the 13th Guards Airborne Division in April 1944. During August and September, Kozin led the 189th Rifle Division during the Tartu Offensive. In September, he returned to command of the 52nd Guards Rifle Division and led it during the Baltic Offensive, Vistula–Oder Offensive, East Pomeranian Offensive and Berlin Offensive. For his leadership of the division, Kozin was awarded the title Hero of the Soviet Union on 29 May. After the war, he continued to serve in the army and retired in 1954. He lived in Barnaul and died in 1992.

== Early life and prewar service ==
Kozin was born on 28 October 1902 in the village of Burkovo-Pokrovskoye (now Novopokrovka) in Tomsk Governorate. His father died when Kozin was still a child and Kozin became a farmworker. He then worked as a laborer at the Tatarsky railway station. Kozin received his only education during the Bolshevik Likbez literacy campaign.

Conscripted into the Red Army in May 1924, Kozin was sent to the 35th Rifle Regiment of the 12th Rifle Division. He graduated from the regimental school in January 1925 and remained assigned to it as a squad leader before being sent to the Omsk Infantry School for further training in October 1926. Upon his graduation from the school in January 1929, Kozin was appointed a platoon commander in the 11th Rifle Regiment of the 4th Rifle Division, stationed at Slutsk in Belarus. Serving as officer for errands under the division commander from July 1932, Kozin was transferred to the 94th Rifle Division in the Siberian Military District in November 1933.

With the 94th, he commanded a company of the 280th Rifle Regiment at Krasnoyarsk before transferring to the 281st Regiment of the division at Achinsk in April 1936. After serving as the assistant regimental chief of staff and battalion chief of staff in the 281st, Kozin became a battalion commander in the 503rd Rifle Regiment of the 91st Rifle Division, formed from the 281st, in September 1939, then held the same position in the 82nd Reserve Rifle Regiment. He became an assistant battalion commander in the district Commanders' Improvement Course (KUKS) at Biysk in July 1940, and in December was appointed commander of the 586th Rifle Regiment of the 107th Rifle Division at Barnaul.

== World War II ==
After Operation Barbarossa, the 107th Rifle Division was transferred to the front and engaged in combat on 16 July near Yelnya. During the Battle of Smolensk, Kozin was reported to have shown leadership skills. In one action, he reportedly sent only one company in frontal attack against superior German troops and outflanked the German positions using his two other companies. This attack reportedly caused the defeat of the German troops and led to a breakthrough.

In August, Kozin became commander of the 100th Rifle Division's 85th Rifle Regiment. He fought in the Yelnya Offensive at the beginning of September. The division became the 1st Guards Rifle Division, the regiment became the 2nd Guards Rifle Regiment, and Kozin was awarded the Order of Lenin for his leadership during the offensive. He led the regiment in defensive battles east of Belgorod and in December fought in the counteroffensive at Moscow. During the Yelnya and Livny Offensives, the regiment advanced 150 kilometers.

In April 1942, Kozin became the commander of the 8th Motor Rifle Division NKVD in the Voronezh area. In June, the division was converted into the 63rd Rifle Division. The division fought in the Battle of Voronezh during the summer. In late November, the division fought in Operation Uranus. The 63rd was part of the 21st Army's main attack and broke through the Romanian-German defenses, advancing southwards. In the area of Raspopinskaya village, the division helped fully encircle two corps of the Romanian Third Army between 21 and 22 November. The 63rd's attacks reportedly split the pocket in half and then simulated a mechanized attack using the division's motor transport battalion. On the evening of 23 November, Romanian 14th Infantry Division commander General Stanescu surrendered the 27,000 troops in the pocket. For his actions, Kozin was awarded the Order of Suvorov 2nd class and the division became the 52nd Guards Rifle Division on 27 November. The division then fought in the Soviet attacks to shrink the Stalingrad Pocket. On 21 January 1943, Kozin was promoted to major general. He was wounded and sent to the hospital. After his recovery, Kozin was sent to study at the Military Academy of the General Staff.

In April 1944, Kozin graduated from the academy and became commander of the 13th Guards Airborne Division, part of the Reserve of the Supreme High Command (Stavka Reserve). In August, he was transferred to command the 189th Rifle Division and led it during the Tartu Offensive. In September, Kozin returned to command the 52nd Guards Rifle Division. He led the division during the Baltic Offensive, where the division became one of the first to reach Riga. In January 1945, the division fought in the Vistula–Oder Offensive. From February to April, the division fought in the East Pomeranian Offensive. From 19 April, the division fought in the Berlin Offensive. During the next three days, the division reportedly overran three German defensive lines and on 21 April the division was among the first to reach Berlin itself. During attacks on the northern outskirts of the city, the division captured 120 quarters in fighting from 22 April to 2 May. On 29 May, Kozin was awarded the title Hero of the Soviet Union and the Order of Lenin for his leadership. He participated in the Moscow Victory Parade of 1945 on 24 June.

== Postwar ==
After the end of the war, Kozin continued in command of the division, which became part of the Group of Soviet Forces in Germany. He became commander of the 22nd Guards Mechanized Division in November 1945 and a year later transferred to the Moscow Military District to command the 18th Separate Guards Rifle Brigade. After completing the one-year improvement course for rifle division commanders at the Frunze Military Academy in February 1951, Kozin was appointed deputy commander of the 87th Rifle Corps of the Far Eastern Military District at Yuzhno-Sakhalinsk. From February 1952 he served as chief of the district Directorate for Officer Redeployment. In January 1954 he was transferred to the reserve due to health issues caused by his war wounds. He lived in Saratov but moved to Barnaul in 1955. He became an honorary citizen of the city. In 1975, Kozin published his memoirs, titled "Гвардейцы в боях" (English: "Guardsmen in Combat"). Kozin died on 11 January 1993 and was buried at the Vlasikhinskoye Cemetery in Barnaul.

== Awards and honors ==
Kozin was a recipient of the following decorations:

- Hero of the Soviet Union
- Order of Lenin (3)
- Order of the Red Banner (3)
- Order of Suvorov, 2nd class
- Order of the Patriotic War, 1st class

Since 2005, Secondary School No. 48 in Barnaul has been named for Kozin.
