= Mikhail Denisenko =

Soviet military commander

Mikhail Ivanovich Denisenko
- Михаил Иванович Денисенко
- Born: 24 July 1899; Temchenko Farm (now Kozelnoe village, Nedryhailiv Raion, Sumy Oblast, Ukraine)
- Died: 7 April 1949 (aged 49); Vitebsk
- Military career
- Allegiance: Soviet Union
- Branch: Red Army
- Service years: 1919–1949
- Rank: Major general
- Commands: 202nd Airborne Brigade; 9th Airborne Corps; 36th Guards Rifle Division; 12th Guards Airborne Division; 105th Guards Rifle Division; 103rd Guards Airborne Division
- Conflicts: Russian Civil War; World War II; Operation Uranus; Third Battle of Kharkov; Battle of Kursk; Battle of the Dnieper; Vienna Offensive; Prague Offensive
- Awards: Hero of the Soviet Union

Mikhail Denisenko (Russian: Михаил Иванович Денисенко; 24 July 1899 – 7 April 1949) was a Red Army Major general and Hero of the Soviet Union. He fought in World War II with the Soviet airborne, leading the 36th Guards Rifle Division and 12th Guards Airborne Division. Postwar, Denisenko commanded the 103rd Guards Airborne Division, before his death in 1949 in a parachute accident.

== Early life ==
Denisenko was born on 24 July 1899 to a peasant family on the Temchenko farm, which is now the village of Kozelnoe in Nedryhailiv Raion in the Russian Empire's Sumy Oblast. After graduating from high school, Denisenko worked on the construction of a railway in 1915.

== Russian Civil War and interwar service ==
In May 1919, Denisenko was drafted into the Red Army and assigned to the 3rd Lebedinsky Guard Company as a Red Army man before being sent to the reserve battalion of the 8th Army and then the 102nd Rifle Regiment of the 12th Rifle Division. With the division, he fought in operations against Anton Denikin's army on the Don and in the Donbas during 1919. From December 1919, Denisenko fought with the 45th Rifle Division during the Odessa Operation and the Kiev offensive. From late November 1920, he was a company political officer in the 420th and 397th Rifle Regiments of the 47th Rifle Division. In 1920, Denisenko joined the Communist Party.

After the end of the war, Denisenko became a cadet and company politruk at the 92nd Lebedinsky Infantry Course in July 1921. After completing the course in 1922, Denisenko entered the Poltava Infantry School, from which he graduated in August 1925. He then served as a platoon commander in the 21st Rifle Regiment of the 7th Rifle Division until October 1926. In 1927, Denisenko graduated from the Engels Military-Political Course in Leningrad and in July was a company political instructor in the 73rd Rifle Regiment of the 25th Rifle Division. From January 1930, he commanded a company and then a battalion of the 119th Rifle Regiment in the 40th Rifle Division. In December 1935, Denisenko became the commander of the training company of the 120th Rifle Regiment in the same division. In April 1936, he became the commander of the reconnaissance battalion in that division. In June 1936, he became the chief of staff of the 1st Airborne Regiment and its commander in August 1937. From December 1940, Denisenko led the 202nd Airborne Brigade.

== World War II ==
At the beginning of Soviet entry into World War II, Denisenko continued to lead the 202nd Airborne Brigade in the Far East. In December 1941, he became the head of a course for junior lieutenants in the Far Eastern Front, and then the 10th Airborne Corps' Chief of Staff. In March 1942, he became the commander of the 9th Airborne Corps in the Moscow Military District. In early August, the corps became the 36th Guards Rifle Division, with Denisenko as its commander. As part of the 57th Army, the division defended the southwestern outskirts of Stalingrad. The division participated in the elimination of the encircled German troops in Stalingrad in early 1943, and then fought in the Third Battle of Kharkov.

The division then fought in the Battle of Kursk and the Battle of the Dnieper. On the night of 26 September, the division crossed the Dnieper and captured a bridgehead near the village of Soshinovka. During the day, the division reportedly repulsed eight German counterattacks, inflicting heavy losses. Denisenko was awarded the title Hero of the Soviet Union and the Order of Lenin on 20 December for his planning of the Dnieper crossing.

In December 1943, Denisenko became the commander of the 12th Guards Airborne Division, held in reserve in Belarus during 1944. In January 1945, the division became the 105th Guards Rifle Division. Denisenko commanded the division during the Vienna Offensive and the Prague Offensive.

== Postwar ==
After the end of World War II, he continued in command of the 105th Guards Rifle Division. In August 1946, Denisenko became the Chief Inspector of the Airborne Forces. From November 1946 to September 1947, he was the deputy commander of the 69th Guards Rifle Division. In December 1948, he graduated from advanced training of division commanders at the Frunze Military Academy. Denisenko became the commander of the 103rd Guards Airborne Division. On 7 April 1949, Denisenko was killed in a parachute jump in Vitebsk.

== Legacy ==
In Volgograd, a street is named after Denisenko. There is also a memorial plaque in honor of Denisenko in Nedryhailiv.
