= 13th Airborne Division =

13th Airborne Division may refer to:

- 13th Airborne Division (United States), an airborne formation in the United States Army during World War II
- 13th Guards Airborne Division, a division of Soviet Airborne Troops which was part of the 37th Guards Airborne Corps

== See also ==
- 13th Division (disambiguation)
