= 103rd Separate Guards Airborne Brigade =

Belarusian Special Forces unit

- Russian: 103-я Витебская отдельная гвардейская Краснознамённая, ордена Ленина, ордена Кутузова II степени воздушно-десантная бригада имени 60-летия СССР; Belarusian: 103-я Вiцебская асобная гвардзейская Чырванасцяжная, ордэна Леніна, ордэна Кутузава II ступені паветрана-дэсантная брыгада імя 60-годдзя СССР
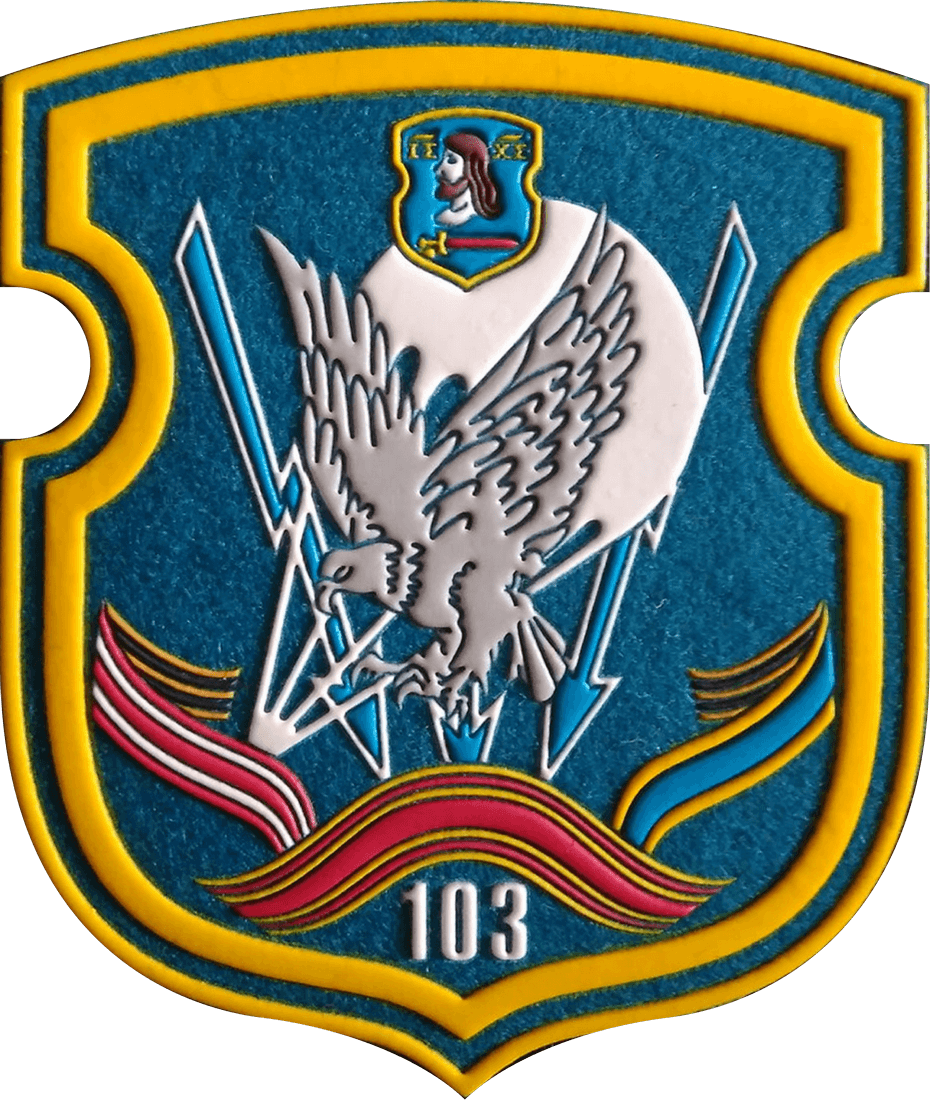
- Sleeve insignia of the brigade
- Active: 1944; 82 years ago (Soviet division); 1993; 33 years ago (modern brigade)
- Country: Soviet Union (1944–1992); Republic of Belarus (1991–1995) /; Belarus (since 1995)
- Branch: Soviet airborne (1946–1992); Belarusian Ground Forces (1992–2007); Special Forces of Belarus (2007–present)
- Type: Infantry, Airborne
- Garrison/HQ: Vitebsk
- Engagements: World War II; Operation Danube; Soviet–Afghan War; United Nations Interim Force in Lebanon; 2022 Kazakh unrest
- Decorations: Order of Lenin; Order of the Red Banner; Order of Kutuzov 2nd class
- Honorifics: 60th Anniversary of the Soviet Union; Vitebsk

Commanders
- Notable commanders: Mikhail Denisenko; Pavel Grachev

Insignia
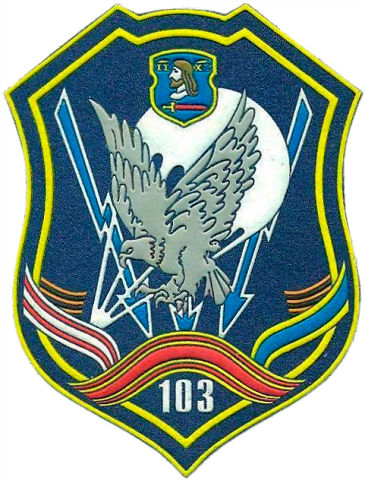
- Early brigade sleeve insignia

The 103rd Separate Guards Airborne Brigade is an airborne brigade of the Belarusian Special Forces. Its predecessor unit was the 103rd Guards Airborne Division (Russian: 103-я гвардейская воздушно-десантная ордена Ленина Краснознаменная ордена Кутузова дивизия имени 60-летия СССР), which was a division of the Soviet Airborne Troops. It was established in 1946 and disbanded in 1993, a year after its transfer to the Armed Forces of Belarus. The division was formed from the 103rd Guards Rifle Division, which fought as infantry during the final months of World War II in the Vienna Offensive following its formation in late 1944.

== History ==
=== World War II ===
The original 103rd Guards Rifle Division was formed from the previous 13th Guards Airborne Division on 18 December 1944 in Bykhaw. The 3rd Guards Airborne Brigade became the 317th Guards Rifle Regiment, the 5th Guards Airborne Brigade became the 322nd Guards Rifle Regiment and the remaining rifle units became the 324th Guards Rifle Regiment. The division became part of the 37th Guards Rifle Corps and in February were embarked on trains and moved to positions south of Budapest. Between 16 March and 1 April, the division advanced along Lake Balaton after participating in the repulse of Operation Spring Awakening. On 23 March, the division helped capture Veszprém, on 26 March Devecser, on 28 March Sárvár and finally Szombathely on 29 March. On 2 April, the division captured Gloggnitz and then fought in Vienna. After the capture of Vienna in the Vienna Offensive, the division advanced westward, pursuing retreating German units.

The division was assigned to rest and resupply in Baden bei Wien on 28 April. The division was awarded the Order of the Red Banner and the Order of Kutuzov 2nd class on 1 May. On the same day, its 317th and 324th Guards Rifle Regiments were awarded the Order of Alexander Nevsky, and its 322nd Guards Rifle Regiment the Order of Kutuzov 2nd class. On 6 May, the division marched in the direction of Vienna and on 8 May was concentrated near Traufeld. It entered Třeboň on 12 May. The division was then located at Szeged but was moved to Seltsy, Ryazan Oblast on 10 February 1946.

=== Postwar ===
In accordance with a Resolution of the Council of Ministers on 3 June 1946, the 103rd Guards Rifle Division was reorganised into the 103rd Guards Airborne Division (Red Banner, Order of Kutuzov 2nd Class), consisting of: Division Headquarters, the 317th Guards Airborne Landing Regiment (Order of Alexander Nevsky), the 322nd Guards Airlanding Regiment (Order of Kutuzov 2nd Class), the 39th Guards Airlanding Regiment (Red Banner, Order of Suvorov 2nd class), the 15th Guards Artillery Regiment and support units. The divisional staff began combat training of the Airborne Troops on 5 August 1946. The division was moved to the city of Polotsk in March 1947. On 1 October 1948, the 322nd Guards Airlanding Regiment was transferred to form the 7th Guards Airborne Division and was replaced by the 39th Guards Airlanding Regiment. After Mikhail Denisenko became commander of the division in December 1948, he was killed in a parachute jump in April 1949.

In 1956 the 350th and 357th Airborne Regiments joined the division from the disbanded 114th Guards Airborne Division. That same year (in June), the division was transferred to Vitebsk, still within the Belorussian Military District. In 1959, division personnel helped test the Antonov An-12 transport and the new D-1/8 parachute. In 1962, the division participated in the Exercise "Vltava" with other Warsaw Pact troops and received thanks from the Czechoslovak Defence Minister. The division received thanks from Grechko in July 1967 for its performance in the Exercise "Dnieper". From 21 August to 20 October 1968, the division participated in Operation Danube, the crushing of the Prague Spring. The division participated in Exercise "Brotherhood in Arms" which was held in East Germany in 1970, and in 1972 it took part in Exercise "Shield-72". In 1975, it became the first Guards Division of the Airborne Troops of the USSR to make a parachute jump out of AN-22 and IL-76 aircraft. The division also participated in Exercises Spring 75 and Vanguard 76. The 103rd Guards Airborne Division participated in the combined arms exercise "Berezin" in Belarus in February 1978. From the outset, they jumped with weapons and equipment, from IL-76s. The actions of the division's personnel on maneuvers were very highly rated by Soviet military commanders.

In December 1979 the division was transferred to Afghanistan. On 26 December, the division crossed the Afghan border. During the war in that country, the division was awarded the Order of Lenin in 1980. The 317th Guards Airborne Regiment withdrew from Afghanistan on 5 February 1989. Two days later, it was followed by the division headquarters, the 357th Guards Airborne Regiment and 1179th Artillery Regiment. On 12 February, the 350th Guards Airborne Regiment departed. A group built around the reinforced 3rd Airborne Battalion of the 357th Guards Airborne Regiment guarded the Kabul airport until 14 February.

The division was transferred to the KGB Border Troops in January 1990, and renamed the 103rd Guards Airborne Division PV KGB. It lost most of its support units, including the artillery regiment, but apparently the 20th Separate Equipment Maintenance and Recovery Battalion was retained. The division guarded the Soviet–Iranian border. On 23 September 1991 it was transferred back to the VDV.

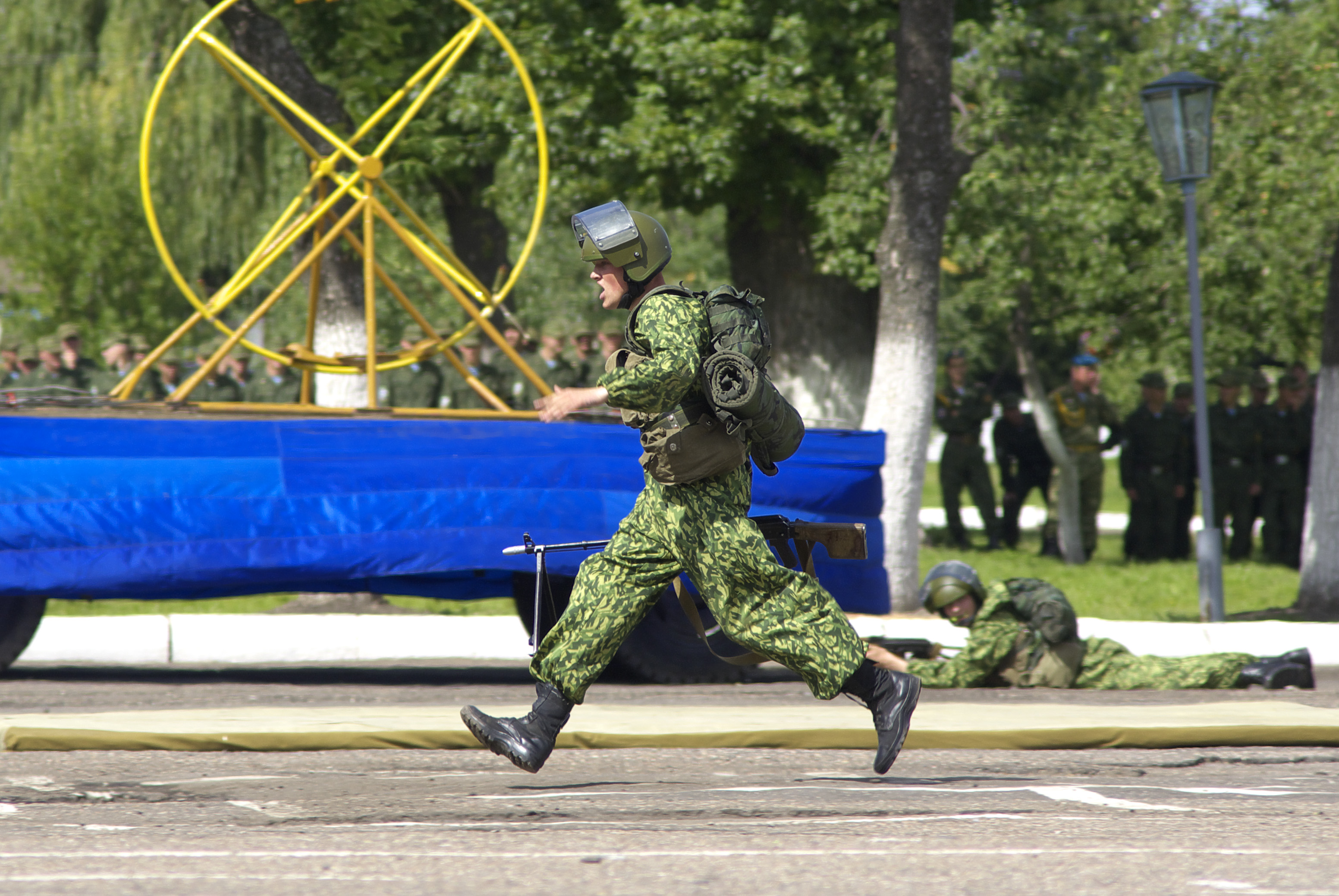
Personnel of the 103rd Guards Mobile Brigade during a demonstration

=== Service in the Armed Forces of Belarus ===
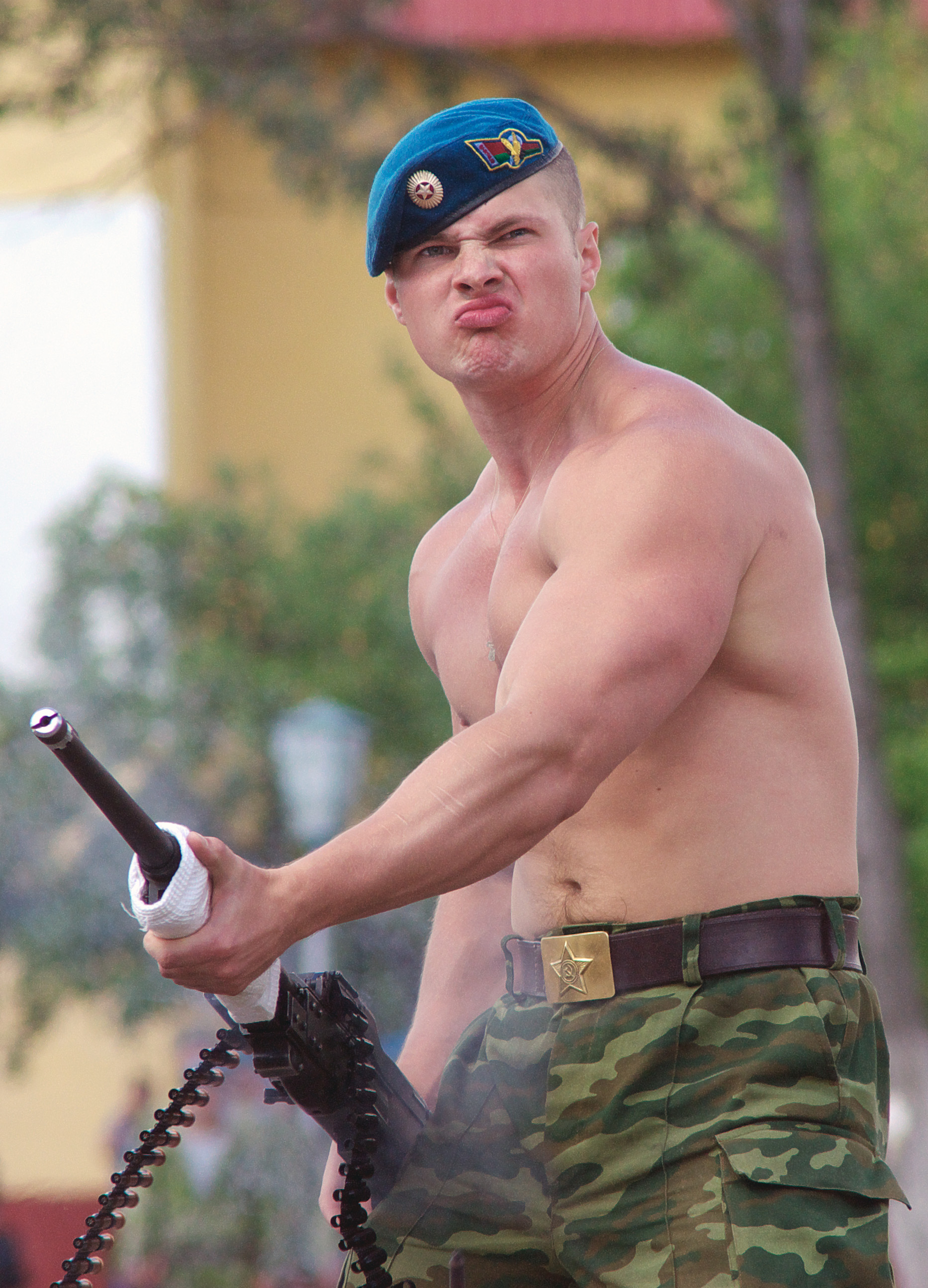
Soldier of the reconnaissance fires from PKT machine gun

On 20 May 1992, a directive of the Minister of Defence of the Republic of Belarus № 5/0251, the 103rd Guards Airborne (Order of Lenin, the Red Banner, Order of Kutuzov) Division became part of the Armed Forces of Belarus. In 1993, the Headquarters 103rd Guards Airborne Division was established as the headquarters Mobile Forces of the Republic of Belarus. The 317th Guards Airborne Regiment was upgraded to the 317th Separate Mobile Brigade on 1 September 1995. The 350th Guards Airborne Regiment became the 350th Separate Mobile Brigade at Borovukha-1 and the 357th Guards Airborne Regiment became the 357th Separate Mobile Training Battalion. The division's 1179th Artillery Regiment was disbanded. The 317th Brigade was withdrawn from the Ground Forces North Western Operational Command on 1 February 2003 and transferred to the Special Forces Directorate of the General Staff. On 15 May, the 317th Separate Mobile Brigade was given the battle flag of the 103rd Guards Airborne Division. It then became the 103rd Separate Guards Mobile Brigade (Russian: 103-я отдельная гвардейская мобильная бригада). During the reorganization, the 350th Separate Guards Mobile Brigade was disbanded in January 2002 and its heritage perpetuated in October by the 350th Separate Guards Mobile Battalion, which became part of the 103rd Brigade.

The brigade has been part of the Special Forces of Belarus since 2007. Unlike the Ground Forces, the Special Forces brigades of Belarus are maintained at full readiness and designated as rapid reaction units. The 103rd is designated as the primary peacekeeping unit of Belarus. As of 2021, it includes three airborne battalions equipped with BTR-70 and BTR-80 armored personnel carriers, and an artillery battalion with towed 120 mm Nona-M1 mortars and 122 mm D-30 towed howitzers.

In 2014, the brigade participated in the Collective Security Treaty Organization exercise "Indestructible Brotherhood 2014" in Kyrgyzstan. They also were in the training exercise "Cooperation 2014", which took place in Kazakhstan. On 2 August 2016, the brigade was renamed the 103rd Guards Airborne Brigade, restoring its original designation, along with the 38th Guards Air Assault Brigade.

On 14 January 2020, the Minister of Defense Andrei Ravkov granted the brigade the Vitebsk honorific after its base; it thus became the 103rd Vitebsk Separate Guards Airborne Order of Lenin, Red Banner, Order of Kutuzov 2nd degree, Brigade named after the 60th anniversary of the USSR.

In March 2020, personnel of the 42 Commando of the British Royal Marines worked with the Peacekeeping Company of the brigade at the Losvido Training Areas during the two-week Exercise Winter Partisan.

In response to the 2022 Kazakh unrest, Belarus was the first of the Collective Security Treaty Organization states to support Russia in its intervention in Kazakhstan, the suppression by force of anti-government protestors. The peacekeeping company of 100 servicemen from the brigade was dispatched to Kazakhstan on 6 January and returned to Belarus on 15 January after guarding strategic locations in the country.

== Composition ==
- Headquarters
- 317th Guards Airborne Battalion
- 350th Guards Airborne Battalion
- 357th Guards Airborne Battalion
- Mixed Artillery Division
- Anti-aircraft missile and artillery battery
- Communications battalion
- Reconnaissance landing company
- Engineer-sapper company
- Security and service company
- Repair Company
- Logistics Company
- Medical company
- CBRN defense platoon
- Peacekeeping company

=== 1947 composition ===
In 1947, the division was composed of the following units.

- 317th Guards Airborne Regiment
- 322nd Guards Airlanding Regiment
- 15th Guards Artillery Regiment
- 572nd Guards Self-Propelled Artillery Battalion
- 105th Guards Antiaircraft Artillery Battalion
- 116th Guards Antitank Artillery Battalion
- 112th Guards Reconnaissance Company
- 13th Guards Communications Company
- 130th Guards Engineering Battalion
- 274th Supply Truck Battalion
- 6th Air-Landing Security Company
- 175th Medical & Sanitary Company
- Separate Training Battalion

== Commanders ==
- Colonel Sergei Stepanov (1944–1945)
- Major general Fedor Bochkov (1945–1948)
- Major general Mikhail Denisenko (1948–1949)
- Colonel Viktor Georgeyvich Kozlov (1949–1952)
- Major general Ilarion Popov (1952–1956)
- Major general Mikhail Aglitski (1956–1959)
- Colonel Dmitry Shkrudnev (1959–1961)
- Colonel Ivan Kobzar (1961–1964)
- Major general Mikhail Kashnikov (1964–1968)
- Major general Alexander Yatsenko (1968–1974)
- Major general Nikolay Arsenevich Makarov (1974–1976)
- Major general Ivan Ryabchenko (1976–1981)
- Major general Albert Slyusarev (1981–1984)
- Major general Yurantin Yarygin (1984–1985)
- Major general Pavel Grachev (1985–1988)
- Major general Evgeny Bocharov (1988–1991)
- Colonel Grigory Kalabukhov (1991–1992)
