= Maria Mordasova =

Russian singer

Maria Mordasova Мария Мордасова
- Born: Maria Nikolayevna Yarkina; February 14, 1915; Nizhnyaya Mazovka, Tambovsky Uyezd, Tambov Governorate, Russian Empire
- Died: September 25, 1997 (aged 82) Voronezh, Russia
- Genres: Russian folk song
- Years active: 1942–1986

Maria Nikolayevna Mordasova (Russian: Мария Николаевна Мордасова; 14 February 1915 – 25 September 1997) was a Soviet and Russian singer, known for her renditions of folk song and chastushkas. People's Artist of the USSR (1981) and Hero of Socialist Labour (1987).

== Early life ==
Maria Nikolaevna Yarkina was born on 14 February 1915 in the village of Nizhnyaya Mazovka in Tambovsky Uyezd, one of several children in a peasant family. Her mother, Praskovia Prokofievna, was an acclaimed local singer.

Yarkina performed in the school choir and in the village club. Even as a schoolchild, she worked as a milkmaid. After finishing school, she joined an amateur theatrical group in Tambov.

Before the Second World War, she was married and widowed. Having taken her husband's surname, she would henceforth be called Maria Mordasova. In 1945, she married the Voronezh chorus' bayan player, Ivan Mikhailovich Rudenko. The marriage was a personal and professional success.

== Career ==
Mordasova moved to Voronezh to work in a textile factory. In the winter of 1942-1943, the Voronezh Russian Folk Chorus was established, of which she was one of the first members. Until 1972, she was its soloist.

Mordasova began to compile Chastushkas, fast-paced traditional Russian songs. She composed nearly 300 chastushkas as well. A performer of outstanding ability, she became very popular in the region.

Following World War II, Mordasova began to tour the Soviet Union.

In 1972, Mordasova joined the Voronezh Regional Philharmonic, leading the choral ensemble.

== Later life ==
Mordasova retired from singing in 1982 and began to write her memoirs. But retirement did not suit her and she fell into depression. When her husband fell seriously ill and into a coma, she suffered a nervous breakdown.

She died in Voronezh on 25 September 1997, and was interred in the Kominternovsk cemetery in the same town.

"Maria Mordasova Apartment-Museum", a museum in her name was established in Voronezh in 2005 in the apartment she had lived in.

== Awards and honors ==
- Honored Artist of the RSFSR (1955)
- People’s Artist of the RSFSR (1958)
- Order of the Red Banner of Labour (1960)
- People's Artist of the USSR (1981)
- Order of Lenin (1987)
- Hero of Socialist Labour (1987)
- Order of the Badge of Honour
