= 36th Guards Rifle Division =

- Active: August 1942 – March 1947 (Redesignated 24th Guards Mechanized Division October 1945)
- Country: Soviet Union
- Branch: Red Army (Soviet Army from 1946)
- Type: Infantry (Mechanized Infantry from October 1945)
- Engagements: Battle of Stalingrad; Battle of the Dnieper; Balaton Defensive Operation; Vienna Offensive
- Decorations: Order of the Red Banner; Order of Suvorov 2nd class; Order of Kutuzov 2nd class
- Honorifics: Verkhnedneprovsk

Commanders
- Notable commanders: Mikhail Denisenko

The 36th Guards Rifle Division (Russian: 36-я гвардейская стрелковая дивизия) was a Guards infantry division of the Red Army during World War II. It was formed from the 9th Airborne Corps in August 1942 as a result of the Soviet need for troops to fight in the Battle of Stalingrad. The division was awarded the honorific Verkhnedneprovsk for its crossing of the Dnieper in September 1943 near that town, later receiving the Order of the Red Banner and the Order of Suvorov, 2nd class, for its actions in the Uman–Botoșani Offensive in March 1944. It fought in the siege of Budapest during late 1944 and early 1945, receiving the Order of Kutuzov, 2nd class, for its actions. In late 1945, it was converted into the 24th Guards Mechanized Division. Stationed in Romania, it was disbanded in early 1947.

== History ==
=== Origins ===
The 9th Airborne Corps was formed in late 1941 when the Soviet Airborne Troops were rebuilt after losses suffered in the defense against Operation Barbarossa, the German invasion of the Soviet Union, which began in June of that year. It was held in reserve, but after the situation around Stalingrad worsened due to Case Blue the ten airborne corps were converted into infantry and sent to the front.

=== Stalingrad ===
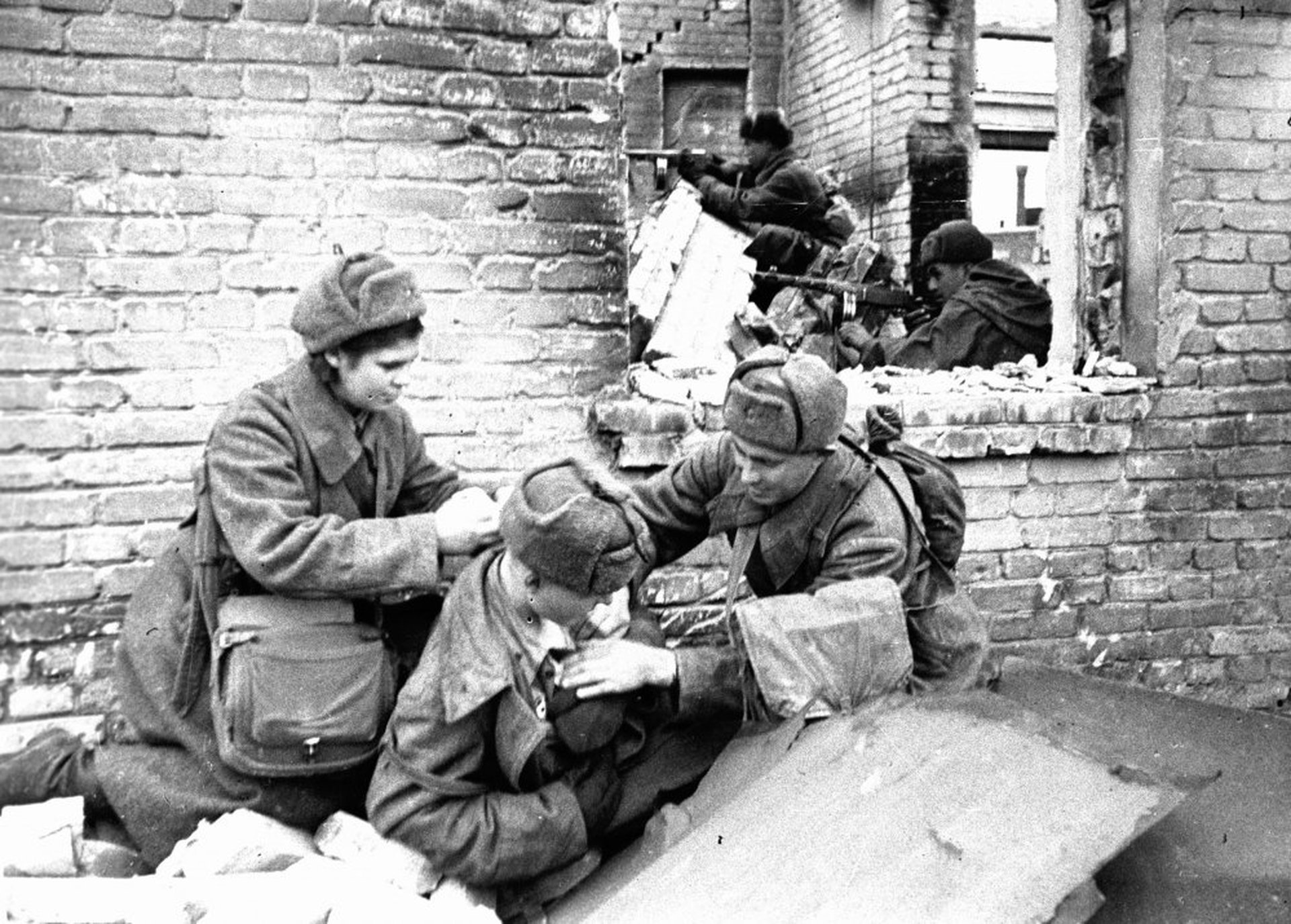
Division corpsmen Yefreytor Filipp Pavlovich Sterkhov of the 1st Battalion, 108th Guards Rifle Regiment and Krasnoarmeytsa Lidiya Sergeyevna Barlina of the 5th Battery, 65th Guards Artillery Regiment bandaging a wounded soldier in Stalingrad, 18 November 1942

The 36th Guards Rifle Division was formed during August 1942 in Ivanovo Oblast from the 9th Airborne Corps. Colonel Mikhail Denisenko, commander of the latter, continued in command of the 36th Guards; he was promoted to major general on 27 November. In addition to smaller support units, it included the 104th, 106th, and 108th Guards Rifle Regiments and the 65th Guards Artillery Regiment. Entering combat on 11 August in the Battle of Stalingrad, it served with the 57th and 64th Armies in fierce defensive battles and participated in the encirclement and elimination of the German troops in Stalingrad. For their steadfastness and courage at Stalingrad, 3,000 soldiers of the division received orders and medals, and the 36th Guards' 39th Guards Anti-Tank (Tank Destroyer) Artillery Battalion was awarded the Order of the Red Banner.

=== 1943 to 1945 ===
From March 1943 as part of the 64th Army (which became the 7th Guards Army on 16 April) of the Voronezh Front the 36th Guards fought in fierce fighting on the Seversky Donets to the southeast of Belgorod and the defensive phrase of the Battle of Kursk. After the army transferred to the Steppe Front, the division fought in the counteroffensive near Kursk and the recapture of Kharkov, returning to the 57th Army in these battles. On the night of 26 September the division crossed the Dnieper and secured a bridgehead on the right bank of the river near Soshinovka northwest of Dnipropetrovsk. For their successful Dnieper crossing, eight soldiers of the division received the title Hero of the Soviet Union. Developing the offensive, the 36th Guards took the railway station of Verkhnodniprovsk, contributing to the capture of the city of the same name on 22 October. As a result, the division received the name of the city as an honorific on the next day.

Denisenko was transferred and replaced by Major General Georgy Lilenkov in February 1944; Lilenkov commanded the division for the remainder of the war. During the March Uman–Botoșani Offensive of the 2nd Ukrainian Front, the 36th Guards, advancing as part of the 7th Guards Army, facilitated the capture of Novoukrainka by the 5th Guards Army and captured the rail junction of Pomoshnaya, for which it was awarded the Order of the Red Banner on 29 March. For successful actions in the crossing of the Southern Bug and the capture of Pervomaysk, the division was awarded the Order of Suvorov, 2nd class, on 1 April. The 36th Guards went on to cross the Prut and fought battles on Romanian territory. The division fought in the Second Jassy–Kishinev Offensive, with the 104th Guards Rifle and 65th Guards Artillery Regiments receiving the Jassy honorific on 15 September for their actions in the capture of the city on 21 August.

Between October and January 1945, the division fought in the Battle of Debrecen and the Budapest Offensive. For capturing the large rail junction of Szolnok the 104th Guards Rifle and 65th Guards Artillery Regiments were awarded the Order of the Red Banner, and the 41st Guards Sapper Battalion received the Order of Alexander Nevsky. For exemplary actions in the breakthrough of strong fortified defenses and the capture of the Aszód city and rail junction the 106th Guards Rifle Regiment received the Order of Suvorov, 3rd class. During the street fighting in the siege of Budapest the personnel of the division were credited with killing 3,600 and capturing 5,300 Axis personnel. For distinguishing itself in the siege of Budapest, the division was awarded the Order of Kutuzov, 2nd class on 5 April. In addition, its 108th and 106th Guards Rifle Regiments received the Order of Alexander Nevsky and the Budapest honorific, respectively, on the same day.

From January 1945, the division, transferred to the 26th Army of the 3rd Ukrainian Front, fought in the Balaton Defensive Operation and the Vienna Offensive. The 36th Guards ended the war on the Mur river near Judenburg in Austria. During the war, 13,000 soldiers of the division received orders and medals, eleven were made Heroes of the Soviet Union, and three became full cavaliers of the Order of Glory.

=== Postwar ===
In October 1945, the division was converted into the 24th Guards Mechanized Division. The 104th, 106th, and 108th Guards Rifle Regiments became the 77th, 78th, and 79th Guards Mechanized Regiments, respectively. Each of the latter included a separate tank battalion: the 159th Guards for the 77th, the 160th Guards for the 78th, and the 167th Guards for the 79th. The division also included the 125th Guards and 34th Tank Regiments. It was assigned to the 57th Army, which became the 9th Mechanized Army in June 1946, as part of the Southern Group of Forces. By this point it was based at Sibiu in Romania. The division was relocated to the Kiev Military District before its disbandment on 21 March 1947.
