= Berezin =

Berezin (feminine: Berezina) is a Russian surname which may refer to:

== People ==
- Aleksei Berezin (born 1993), Russian footballer
- André Berezin (born 1960), Brazilian rower
- Evelyn Berezin (1925–2018), American computer designer best known for designing the first computer-driven word processor
- Felix Berezin (1931–1980), Russian mathematician and physicist
- Fyodor Berezin (born 1960), Ukrainian science fiction writer
- Ilya Berezin (1818–1896), Russian orientalist
- Irina Berezina, chess player
- Lori Berezin, American writer, actress, artist
- Mabel Berezin, sociologist at Cornell University
- Maxim Berezin (born 1991), Russian Ice hockey player
- Sergei Berezin (1971–2024), Russian hockey player
- Sergei Berezin (footballer) (born 1960), Russian footballer
- Tanya Berezin (1941–2023), American actress, educator and co-founder and artistic director of the Circle Repertory Company
- Vladimir Berezin (born 1941), Russian swimmer
- Vladimir Berezin (TV presenter) (born 1957), Russian actor, journalist and TV and radio presenter

== Other uses ==
- Berezin B-20, 20mm caliber autocannon
- Berezin integral, mathematical way of defining integration
- The Berezin UB Soviet aircraft machine gun
- Exercise Berezin was a Soviet military exercise that took place in the Byelorussian SSR in February 1978
- Jewish (eastern Ashkenazic): habitational name for someone from any of various villages called Berez(i)no, Berez(i)na, and Bereza, in Belarus and Ukraine, all derived from an Eastern Slavic noun meaning ‘birch tree’. Russian: topographic name for someone who lived by a birch tree, from Russian bereza ‘birch’ + the Russian possessive suffix -in.
