= 217th Guards Airborne Regiment =

- Active: 1948–present
- Country: Soviet Union (1948–1992); Russia
- Branch: Airborne Troops
- Type: Airborne
- Size: Regiment
- Part of: 98th Guards Airborne Division
- Garrison/HQ: Ivanovo
- Engagements: Second Chechen War; Russo-Ukrainian War; Kharkiv offensive (2024–present); Wagner Group rebellion (alleged); Kursk offensive (2024–2025); Tyotkino incursion (2025)
- Battle honours: Order of Kutuzov, 3rd class

Commanders
- Current commander: Guards Lt. Colonel Viktor Vasilyevich Droedov

The 217th Guards Airborne Regiment is an airborne regiment of the Russian Airborne Troops. It was formed in 1948 from elements of the 296th Guards Airlanding Regiment. Currently based in Ivanovo, it is part of the 98th Guards Airborne Division.

== History ==
The regiment was formed on 1 October 1948 in Galyonki from elements of the 296th Guards Airlanding Regiment. It was part of the 13th Guards Airborne Division. In April 1955, the division was disbanded and the regiment transferred to the 98th Guards Airborne Division. In 1965, for its performance in exercises on Sakhalin, the regiment received thanks from the USSR Ministry of Defense. At the time, the regiment was commanded by Major Gennady Margelov. On 22 February 1968, the regiment was awarded the Order of Kutuzov 3rd class.

Beginning on 25 July 1969, the regiment moved to Bolhrad. 119 personnel of the regiment fought in the Soviet–Afghan War.

The regiment deployed to Oktemberyan between 23 and 29 March 1988. On 21 June it deployed in Stepanakert, which it left on 2 August. It was deployed to Yerevan on 21 September and returned to Bolhrad on 16 November. On 24 May 1989, it went back to Yerevan, which it left on 25 August. It deployed to Baku on 3 October and remained there until 18 October.

While paratroopers were being airlifted out of Baku on 18 October 1989, an Il-76MD crashed near the city, killing 9 crew members and 48 paratroopers from the regiment. On 16 January 1990 it again deployed to Baku and left there on 16 March. As a result of the Dissolution of the Soviet Union, elements of the regiment became the Ukrainian 25th Airborne Brigade. Beginning on 23 April 1993, the regiment moved to Ivanovo, where it is still based today.

The regiment fought in the Second Chechen War, during which its chief of staff was Yunus-bek Yevkurov.

In January 2022, the regiment was reportedly deployed to Belarus in the prelude to the Russian invasion of Ukraine.

It was reported by a Ukrainian source that the regiment was fighting in Bakhmut during the Battle of Bakhmut.

The regiment reportedly sided with Prigozhin during the rebellion between Wagner group and Russian MoD.
