= 37th Guards Airborne Corps =

37th Guards Rifle Corps 37th Guards Airborne Corps
- Active: 1944–1956
- Country: Soviet Union
- Branch: Red Army
- Type: infantry, airborne
- Size: corps
- Engagements: World War II: Vyborg-Petrozavodsk Offensive; Vienna Offensive; Prague Offensive
- Battle honours: Svir; Order of the Red Banner

Commanders
- Notable commanders: Pavel Mironov Vasily Margelov

The 37th Guards Airborne Corps was a Red Army airborne corps. The corps was established as the 37th Guards Rifle Corps on 19 January 1944. In August, it was converted into an airborne corps. On 18 December, it became an infantry corps again. The corps was converted to an airborne corps on 10 June 1946 and disbanded in June 1956.

== History ==
The 37th Guards Rifle Corps was created in the Moscow Military District from airborne divisions converted into infantry on 19 January 1944. In June 1944, the corps was transferred to the line of the Svir River to fight in the Svir-Petrozavodsk Operation. Between 11 and 15 June, the corps detrained at Pasha and Oyat stations in Leningrad Oblast and concentrated 40 kilometers south of Lodeynoye Pole. The corps was sent into battle on 21 June with the shock group of the 7th Army. It crossed the Svir River, with its 98th Guards Rifle Division and 99th Guards Rifle Division in the first line and its 100th Guards Rifle Division in the second line. on the first day of the offensive, the corps reportedly advanced 8 kilometers into the Finnish rear. Elements of the corps cut the Olonets-Petrozavodsk road on 25 June and captured Olonets on the same day. By 4 July, the corps was on the Tulemajoki River, but was only able to advance 15 to 20 kilometers from it due to strong Finnish opposition. On 11 July, the corps attempted to resume the attack, but was not able to make any progress. On 13 July, the corps shifted to defensive operations.

In August, it became an airborne corps as part of an attempt to form a Separate Airborne Army and was transferred to the reserve at Mogilev, where it remained until January 1945. On 18 December 1944, it was reconverted to a rifle corps. On 18 January 1945, the corps was transferred to Hungary. In February, the corps arrived in Budapest, where its elements were sent into battle on 21 February. It helped repulse Operation Spring Awakening and then advanced in the direction of Vienna. After the capture of Vienna on 1 April, the corps helped capture Gloggnitz, Wiener Neustadt and Neuenkirchen. After 8 May, it attacked the Schörner Group during the Prague Offensive.

On 10 June 1946, the corps again became airborne. The corps transferred to Monastyrische in Primorsky Krai during October 1945. The 13th Guards Airborne Division was activated from the 98th Guards Airborne Division's 296th Guards Air Landing Regiment in October 1948. The 13th Guards Airborne Division was disbanded in 1955. It was disbanded in April 1956.

== Composition ==
In February 1944, the corps was composed of the following divisions:

- 98th Guards Rifle Division
- 99th Guards Rifle Division
- 100th Guards Rifle Division

In February 1945, the corps was composed of the following divisions:

- 98th Guards Rifle Division
- 99th Guards Rifle Division
- 103rd Guards Rifle Division

In 1955, the corps was composed of the following divisions:

- 13th Guards Airborne Division
- 98th Guards Airborne Division
- 99th Guards Airborne Division

== Commanders ==
- Lieutenant general Pavel Mironov (19 January 1944 – May 1946)
- Lieutenant general Andrei Bondarev (May 1946 – 15 April 1950)
- Lieutenant general Vasily Margelov (15 April 1950 – May 1952)
- Chief Marshal of Aviation Alexander Golovanov (May 1952 – April 1953)
- Lieutenant general Vasily Margelov (April 1953 – 31 May 1954)
