= 5th Guards Rifle Division =

5th Guards Rifle Division (1941–1957) 5th Guards Motor Rifle Division (1957–1959)
- Active: 1941–1959
- Country: Soviet Union
- Branch: Red Army / Soviet Army
- Type: Motorized infantry, infantry
- Engagements: World War II; Battle of Moscow; Battle of Rzhev; Operation Kutuzov; Operation Bagration; Vitebsk-Orsha Offensive; Minsk Offensive; Vilnius Offensive; Gumbinnen Operation; Battle of Königsberg
- Decorations: Order of Lenin; Order of the Red Banner; Order of Suvorov
- Battle honours: Gorodok

Commanders
- Notable commanders: Pavel Mironov

The 5th Guards Rifle Division was an infantry division of the Red Army in World War II. It fought at Kaluga, Orel, Moscow, Bryansk, Gorodok, and in Belorussia, East Prussia, and Kurland.

== World War II ==
The 107th Rifle Division was reorganized into a Guards unit designated the 5th Guards Rifle Division on 26 September 1941, in recognition of its performance during the Yelnya offensive. The division included the 12th, 17th and 21st Guards Rifle Regiments, the 24th Guards Artillery Regiment and smaller support units. 107th Rifle Division commander Colonel Pavel Mironov continued to command the 5th Guards.

The division was withdrawn to re-form in the reserve of the Western Front in the area of Vyshny Volochyok.

As part of the 49th Army of the Western Front, the division participated in the defensive battles near Moscow. The division operated successfully in the defensive operations and during the subsequent Soviet counteroffensive during the winter of 1941–1942.

The division was part of the "operational army" in the following periods: 26/09/1941 - 22/04/1944, 28/05/1944 - 09/05/1945.

On 4 October 1941 in the region of Mtsensk and, in the area of Bryansk Front, a Stavka order hastily concentrated reserve units, from which the 1st Guards Special Rifle Corps was formed, which the division joined. However, due to the worsening of the situation on the Western Front, the same day the division was reassigned to the 49th Army and its trains directed via Gorbachev to Sukhinichi. On 5 October the division began to advance to the Medyn area to attack in the Yukhnov area as well.

By 1 November 1941, the division was with 49th Army, alongside 7th Guards Rifle Division and 60th Rifle Division.

In conjunction with the 19th Rifle Brigade, the division took part in the liberation of Tarusa on 19 December 1941 and Kondrovo on 19 January 1942, as well as assisting in the liberation of Yukhnov on 5 March. For the heroism shown by its personnel in the battle near Moscow, the division was awarded the Order of the Red Banner on 3 May. From May 1942 to June 1943 the division was part of the reserve of the Western Front, and the front's 33rd and 16th Armies. In July 1943 the division transferred to the 11th Guards Army, with which it operated until the end of the war. During July and August the division took part in the Orel offensive. In September it took part in the Bryansk offensive. In December it took part in the Gorodok offensive. For distinction in battles for the capture of Gorodok, an important fortified point of the German defenses in the Vitebsk sector, the division received the name of Gorodok as an honorific on 24 December 1943.

During the Minsk offensive, enabling the breakthrough of the German defenses in the Orsha sector, the 5th Guards Rifle Division rapidly developed the offensive, forcing a crossing of the Berezina and in conjunction with other units liberated Borisov on 1 July 1944. For its successful performance in the operation, the division was awarded the Order of Suvorov, 2nd class, on 10 July. By 14 July elements of the division reached the Neman, forced a crossing of the river and established a bridgehead. In October the 5th Guards took part in the breakthrough of German fortified defenses in the Gumbinnen operation. During the East Prussian offensive, the division broke through the deeply echeloned German defenses and took part in the Battle of Königsberg, receiving the Order of Lenin in recognition of its performance on 17 May 1945. The division ended the war in the Samland offensive and taking of Pillau.

During the war, 24,000 soldiers of the division were decorated, and eighteen received the title Hero of the Soviet Union. It ended the war with the full designation 5th Guards Rifle Gorodok Order of Lenin Red Banner Order of Suvorov Division.

== Postwar ==
With 11th Guards Army of the 3rd Belorussian Front May 1945. Became 5th Guards Motor Rifle Division in May 1957 (Military Unit Number 08618); disbanded in 1959 at Gvardeysk.

== Commanders ==
The following officers commanded the division:

- Colonel Pavel Mironov (26 September 1941–April 1942, major general 10 January 1942)
- Colonel Mikhail Yerokhin (May–September 1942, major general 3 May 1942)
- Colonel Aleksey Pavlov (September 1942–February 1943, major general November 1942)
- Colonel Nikolai Soldatov (February 1943–April 1944)
- Colonel Nikolai Kravtsov (April 1944–May 1944)
- Colonel Nikolai Volkov (May 1944–January 1945)
- Major General Georgy Peters (January 1945–May 1946)
- Major General Mikhail Pronin (May 1946–May 1947)
- Major General Ivan Ulitin (May 1947–February 1956)
