= 98th Guards Airborne Division =

Russian Airborne Troops formation

98th Guards Airborne Svir Red Banner Orders of Kutuzov and Alexander Nevsky Division
- 98-я гвардейская воздушно-десантная Свирская Краснознамённая, орденов Кутузова и Александра Невского дивизия имени 70-летия Великого Октября
- Great emblem of the 98th Guards Airborne Division
- Active: 1943–present
- Country: Soviet Union (1943–1991); Russia (1991–present)
- Branch: Soviet Airborne Forces; Russian Airborne Forces
- Type: Airborne forces
- Role: Light Infantry; Airborne Infantry; Airmobile infantry
- Size: Division
- Part of: Russian Armed Forces
- Garrison/HQ: Ivanovo
- Mottos: Честь и Родина превыше всего! (Honor and Motherland above all!)
- Anniversaries: 3 May
- Engagements: World War II; Second Soviet–Finnish War; Eastern Front; Budapest Offensive; Vienna Offensive; Prague Offensive; Soviet–Afghan War; First Chechen War; Second Chechen War; Russo-Georgian War; Russo-Ukrainian War; War in Donbas; Invasion of Ukraine; Kyiv offensive; 2023 Ukrainian counteroffensive
- Decorations: Guards; Order of the Red Banner; Order of Kutuzov; Order of Alexander Nevsky
- Battle honours: Svir

Commanders
- Current commander: Guards Maj. Gen. Ruslan Yevkodimov

Insignia
- Shoulder sleeve insignia

The 98th Guards Airborne Svir Red Banner Orders of Kutuzov and Alexander Nevsky Division named after the 70th Anniversary of the Great October Revolution (Russian: 98-я гвардейская воздушно-десантная Свирская Краснознамённая, орденов Кутузова и Александра Невского дивизия имени 70-летия Великого Октября) is an airborne division of the Russian Airborne Troops, currently based in Ivanovo.

== History ==
=== Second World War ===
During the Second World War, the formation began its existence as the 98th Guards Rifle Division (ru:98-я гвардейская стрелковая дивизия). It incorporated 296th Guards Rifle Regiment (formerly the 18th Independent Guards Airborne Brigade), 299th GRR (fmr 19 IGAB), 302nd GRR (fmr 20 IGAB). Formed in December 1943-January 1944 at Demitrov in the Moscow Military District. It was part of the 37th Guards Airborne Corps, 9th Guards Army on the Karelian Front (May 1944), on the Svir river (June 1944) and near Budapest in February 1945. The division ended the war near Prague.

=== Cold War ===
On 7 June 1946, the division became an airborne unit at Pokrovka, Primorsky Krai. It included the 296th Guards Air-Landing Regiment, the 299th Guards Airborne Regiment and the 17th Guards Artillery Regiment. On 1 October 1948, the 296th was used to form the 13th Guards Airborne Division and was replaced by the new 95th Guards Air-Landing Regiment. In 1949, the 95th became an airborne regiment.

On 1 June 1951, the division relocated to Belogorsk. The 217th Guards Airborne Regiment joined the 98th from the disbanded 13th Guards Airborne Division on 30 April 1955. In April 1956, the 95th was disbanded and replaced by the disbanded 99th Guards Airborne Division's 300th Guards Airborne Regiment. The 17th Guards Artillery Regiment also disbanded and was replaced by the 74th Guards Artillery Regiment of the 99th Division.

In June 1956, the 37th Guards Airborne Corps was disbanded and the division was directly subordinated to the Airborne Headquarters. On 6 January 1959, the 243rd Separate Military-Transport Aviation Squadron was activated with the division, equipped with 10 Antonov An-2 transports. On 15 August 1960, the 74th Guards Artillery Regiment became the 812th Separate Guards Artillery Battalion. The battalion became the 1065th Guards Artillery Regiment on 27 April 1962.

On 22 February 1968, for achievements in combat and political training, and in connection with the 50th anniversary of the USSR Armed Forces, the Division was awarded the Order of Kutuzov, 2nd degree. In August 1969, units of the division relocated to Bolgrad in the Odessa Military District (division headquarters, 217th and 299th Guards Airborne Regiments, part of the services) and Chișinău (300th Guards Airborne Regiment) and Merry Kut, Artsyz Raion (1065th Guards Artillery regiment).

The division became involved in the major exercises "South-71", "Spring-72", "Crimea-73", "Ether-74", "Spring-75", "Shield-79", "Shield-82", "Summer-90".

=== End of the Soviet era ===
In summer 1991, the division received instructions from the Government of Ukraine to swear allegiance to the Ukrainian Armed Forces. The division staff and most of the troops refused the order; the division had a large number of ethnic Ukrainians but loyalty to the division and the VDV took precedence over ethnic roots.

In February 1992, the division's regiments were ordered by VDV headquarters to prepare for a deployment to Chechnya. However, the commander of the Odesa Military District Vitaliy Radetsky arrived at the division headquarters and disputed the deployment, ordering Ukrainian Army pontoon-laying trucks to block the division's airfields. Divisional commander Valery Vostrotin ended up defusing the situation, as the pontoon truck unit's chief of staff was Vostrotin's acquaintance from Soviet Army days, and did not want the confrontation to escalate. Eventually the Chechnya deployment was canceled.

On 1 October 1992, the 300th Guards Airborne Regiment left the division and became a separate unit. It was replaced by the 106th Guards Airborne Division's 331st Guards Airborne Regiment.

The division was relocated from Bolgrad in Ukraine to Ivanovo after the fall of the Soviet Union during early 1993, following an agreement between Russia and Ukraine over dividing the division's equipment. A significant number of ethnic Ukrainian paratroopers (around 40% of the division's manpower) transferred to the Ukrainian military and formed the 1st Airmobile Division. The rest of the formation moved to Ivanovo in the spring of 1993 and by April the division was transferred to the Russian military.

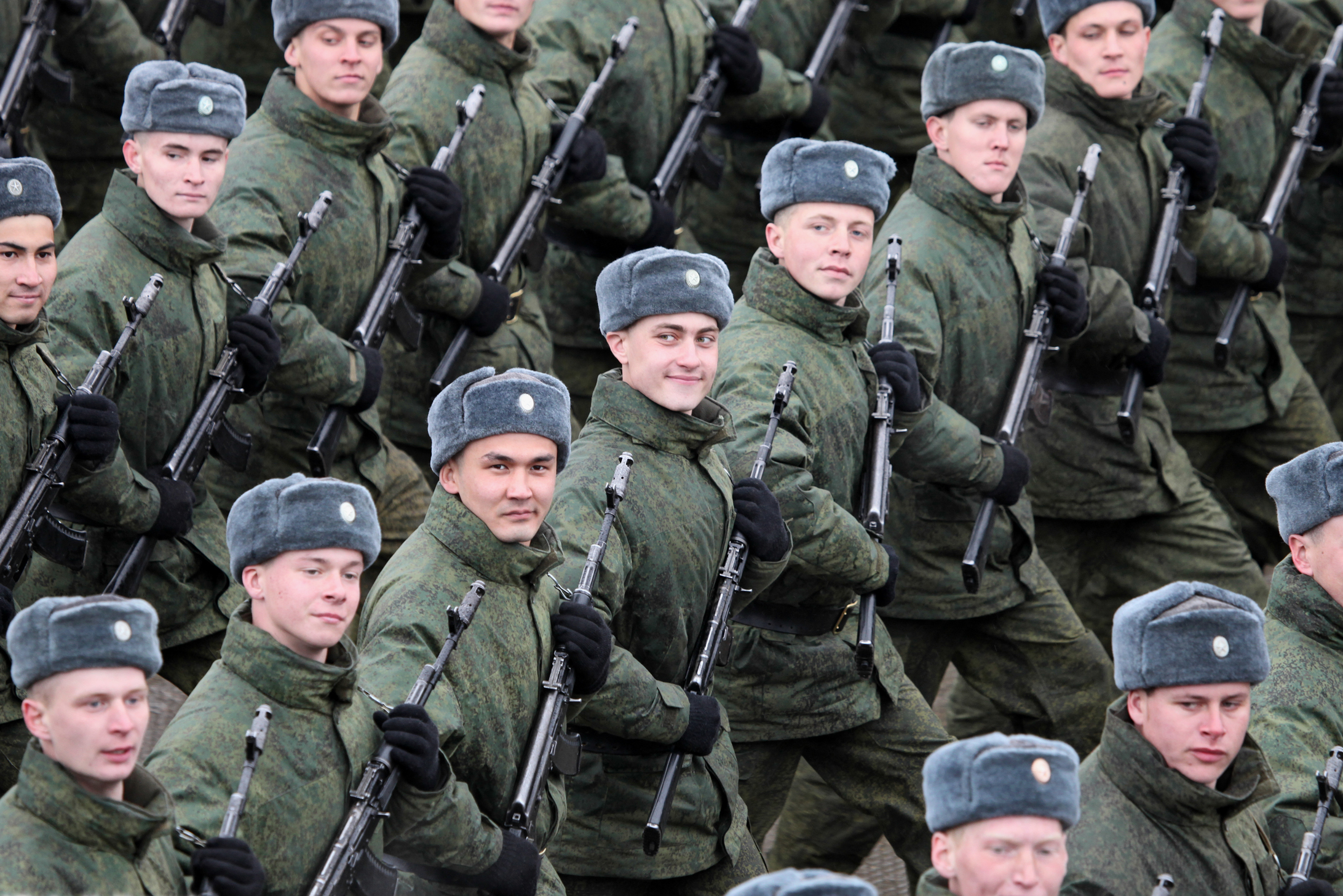
98th Guards Airborne Division in April 2012

In October 1992, the 300th Guards Parachute Regiment was detached and sent to Abakan in the Siberian Military District. In the city of Abakan, four years later, the 300th Guards Parachute Regiment was reorganised as the 100th independent Guards Airborne Brigade, but was then disbanded circa 1998.

In December 1997, the 299th Guards Airborne Regiment was absorbed into the 217th Guards Airborne Regiment.

=== Present ===
Today, its two regiments, the 217th and 299th, are stationed near the Ivanovo Severny military-transport airfield. However another source lists the two constituent regiments as the 217th and 331st, the later having transferred from 106th 'Tula' Guards Airborne Division in 1998.

It took part in the 2008 Russo-Georgian War in the Battle of Tskhinvali of the South Ossetian theatre.

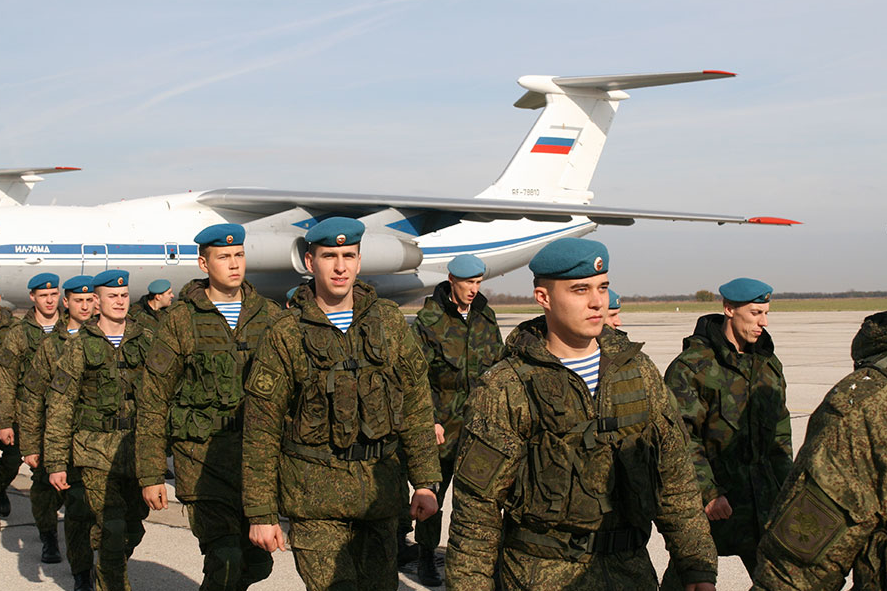
98th Guards Airborne Division in November 2016

==== Russo-Ukrainian war ====
In August 2014, an unsubstantiated source alleged 10 members of the division were captured, amidst the War in Donbas, near the Russia–Ukraine border; according to Ukraine while conducting operations in Ukraine, after having crossed the border illegally; according to Russia they had "crossed the border by accident on an unmarked section". Russia has been accused of, and has denied, supporting the pro-Russian separatists who battled the Ukrainian army in the war in Donbas. A battalion tactical group of the division's 331st Guards Regiment allegedly participated in the August fighting. In February 2015, its 217th Guards Regiment and 1065th Guards Artillery Regiment were allegedly participating in the war.

In January 2022, elements of the division's 217th Airborne Regiment were reportedly deployed to Belarus in the prelude to the Russian invasion of Ukraine.

During the invasion, the division participated in the Kyiv offensive. One of its regiments, the 331st Guards Airborne Regiment, suffered heavy losses; its commander, Colonel Sergei Sukharev was allegedly killed in action. The division's commander Colonel Viktor Gunaza was dismissed by end of March. The division was involved in defensive operations around Klishchiivka alongside the 76th Guards Air Assault Division and Storm-Z detachments during the 2023 Ukrainian counteroffensive.

On August 1, 2023, officials from the Yaroslavl Oblast announced the re-formation of the retired 299th Guards Parachute Regiment, which was later confirmed by Sergei Shoigu on September 26. Due to operational security the exact composition of this new Regiment is unknown, however, Russian military commentator Aleksei Sunonkin speculated that it was a support regiment of either motorized or regular infantry and not a VDV trained and equipped unit.

Since February 2024, parts of the division that performed defensive actions around Klishchiivka are involved in the storm of Ivanivske, Donetsk Oblast and Bohdanivka, Bakhmut Raion, Donetsk Oblast. Starting April 4, they became part of the battle of Chasiv Yar.

In July 2024, the division was awarded the Order of Alexander Nevsky.

== Structure ==
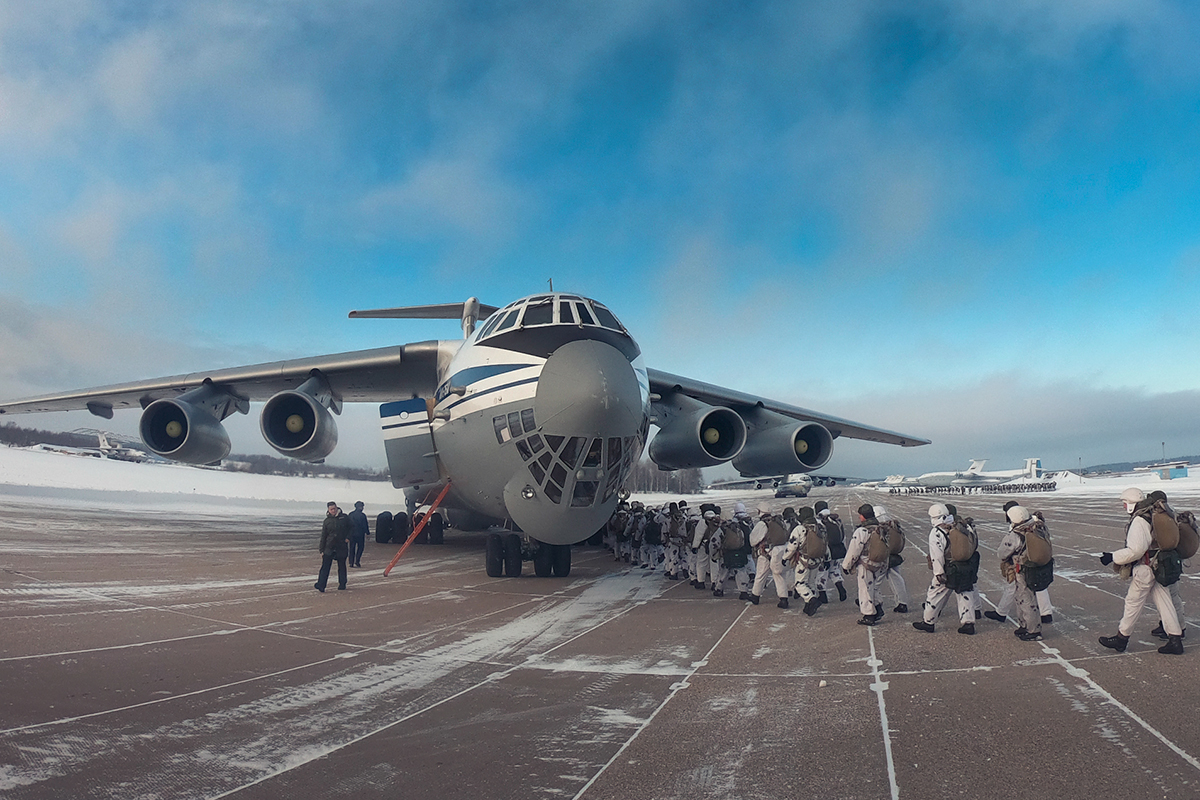
Units of the 98th Airborne Division are loading onto Il-76 aircraft at the Ivanovo-Severny airfield during the parachute exercise in 2019.

In 2014, the subordinate units of the division were as follows:

- 98th Division HQ - (Ivanovo)
  - 15th Maintenance Battalion (Ivanovo)
  - 36th Medical Detachment (airmobile) (Ivanovo)
  - 215th Reconnaissance Battalion в/ч 65391 (Ivanovo)
  - 674th Guards Signal Battalion (Ivanovo)
  - 661st Engineer Battalion (Ivanovo)
  - 728th Courier-Postal station (Ivanovo)
  - 969th Airborne Support Company (Ivanovo)
  - 1683rd Logistics Battalion (Ivanovo)
  - Training Center (Pesochnoe village, Yaroslavl region)
- 217th Guards Airborne Regiment в/ч 62295 (Ivanovo)
- 299th Guards Parachute Regiment (TBD) (Yaroslavl)
- 331st Guards Airborne Regiment в/ч 71211 (Kostroma)
- 1065th Guards Artillery Red Banner Regiment в/ч 62297 (Kostroma)
- 5th Guards Anti-Aircraft Missile Regiment в/ч 65376 (Ivanovo)
- 243rd Military Transport Aviation Squadron in Ivanovo

== Commanders ==
- Colonel Konstantin Vindushev (23 December 1943 – 10 November 1944)
- General-mayor Vasily Larin (11 November 1944–January 1947)
- General-mayor Ivan Moshlyak (January–May 1947)
- General-mayor Mikhail Alimov (7 May 1947–May 1950)
- General-mayor Valery Savchuk (May 1950–4 April 1952)
- Colonel Pyotr Ryabov (4 April 1952 – 1 July 1954, promoted to general-mayor 3 August 1953)
- Colonel Ivan Dedov (15 October 1954 – 30 May 1956)
- Colonel Andrey Yevdan (30 May 1956 – 26 January 1957)
- General-mayor Mikhail Sorokin (26 February 1957 – 12 September 1962)
- General-mayor Dmitry Sukhorukov (12 September 1962 – 28 March 1966)
- Colonel Nikolai Baranov (28 March 1966 – 1967, general-mayor 23 February 1967)
- Colonel Gennady Samoylenko (1967–1973, general-mayor 19 February 1968)
- Aleksey Anatolyevich Sokolov (1973–1977)
- Vitali Mikhailovich Lebedev 1977–1982
- Osvaldas Mikolovich Pikauskas 1982–1985
- Aleksandr Alekseevich Chindarov 1985–1989
- Valery Aleksandrovich Vostrotin 1989–1992
- Aleksandr Nikolaevich Bespalov 1992–1996
- Aleksandr Ivanovich Lentsov 1996–2009
- Aleksei Nikolaevich Ragozin 2010–2013
- Sergey Nikolaevich Volyk 2013–2015
- Dmitry Aleksandrovich Ulyanov 2015–2017
- Nikolai Petrovich Choban 2017–2020
- Viktor Igorevich Gunaza 2020–2022
- Yevgeny Nikolayevich Tonkikh c. 2023–2024
- Ruslan Leontyevich Tevkodimov 2024–present
