= 8th Motor Rifle Division NKVD =

Soviet military unit

8th Motorized Rifle Division of the NKVD Internal Troops
- Active: January 1942 - June 1942
- Country: Soviet Union
- Branch: NKVD
- Type: Infantry
- Engagements: World War II: Fighting in the area Oboyan - Stary Oskol - Buturlinovka

Commanders
- Notable commanders: Colonel F. M. Mazhirin (November 1941 – January 1942); Colonel V. F. Krylov (January 1942); Colonel V. A. Gorishnii (February 1942 – April 1942); Colonel N. D. Kozin (April–July 1942)

The 8th Motorized Rifle Division of the NKVD Internal Troops (Russian: 8-я мотострелковая дивизия внутренних войск НКВД СССР 8-y motostrelkovaya diviziya vnutrenikh voisk NKVD SSSR) was formed in accordance with NKVD Order Number 0021 from January 5, 1942, during execution GKO decree number 1099- ss on January 4, 1942. It was based on the 23rd Motorized Rifle Division NKVD Internal Troops.

David Glantz writes that in early December, the Southwestern Front combined the remnants of the 91st, 92nd, 94th, and 98th Border Guards Detachments with the 6th, 16th and 28th NKVD MRRs to form the division.(Colossus Reborn, 165)

The 8th Infantry Division of the NKVD Internal Troops was part of the troops of the South-Western Front and included the:

- 4th Red Banner Motor Rifle Regiment;
- 6th Motorized Rifle Regiment;
- 16th Motorized Rifle Regiment;
- 28th Motorized Rifle Regiment;
- 266th Motorized Rifle Regiment;
- 274th Motorized Rifle Regiment;
- 10th Artillery Regiment;

On May 9, 1942, from the 8th Motorized Rifle Division of Internal Troops stand

- Management Division,
- 4th Red Banner Motor Rifle Regiment,
- 266th Motorized Rifle Regiment,
- 274th Motorized Rifle Regiment.

On the basis of these parts of the 8th Motorized Rifle Division of the NKVD the 13th Rifle Division NKVD was formed. The 287th Infantry Regiment of the 3rd Infantry Division NKVD internal troops also joined the division.

Colonel Gorishnii Vasily Akimovich was appointed the Divisional commander, while military Political commissar Division Senior Battalion Commissar Ilya Arkhipovich Vlasenko.

== With the Red Army ==
The remaining units of the division were part of the 8th Motorized Rifle Division NKVD Internal Troops until June 25, 1942, when the division joined the Red Army and was named the 63rd Rifle Division. (The 63rd Mountain Rifle Division had been formed from the 2nd Georgian Infantry Division in 1936-37 and had been destroyed in 1942). The division then fought in the Battle of Stalingrad.

On November 23, 1942, the 63rd Rifle Division was transformed into the 52nd Riga-Berlin Guards Rifle Division for military merit. From April 22 to May 2 the division, in constant fighting took more than 20 km, 120 blocks in the streets of Berlin. On May 2 alone, Division soldiers captured more than 7,000 Germans. For their courage and fighting in the successful offensive on Berlin the division received the honorary title "Berlin" on 11 June 1945.

The commanders of the 52nd Guards Rifle Division were:

- Nestor Kozin (06/26/1942 – 01/21/1943), a colonel, made major-general 01/23/1943; Later awarded the Hero of the Soviet Union.
- Nekrasov, Ivan Mikhailovich (05/09/1943 – 11/17/1943), colonel, made major general on 09.15.43;
- Kolchigin, Bogdan K. (11/25/1943 – 12/25/1943), Major-General;
- Simonov, Nikolai (12/26/1943 – 09/23/1944), Colonel;
- Nestor Kozin (09/24/1944 – 05/09/1945), Major-General.

The division was part of the 21st Army (April 1943 - 6th Guards), 3rd Shock Army (February–March 1944) the 1st Shock Army (April–October 1944); and 3rd Shock Army (Nov 1944 – May 1945). On May 1, 1945, it was part of 38th Rifle Corps, 3rd Shock Army.

Thousands of division soldiers were decorated during the war, and seven, including the first divisional commander, awarded the Hero of the Soviet Union.

After the formation of the 52nd Guards Rifle Division, the 63rd Rifle Division was reformed again at Kaluga from the 45th and 86th Rifle Brigades in May 1943. It fought at Stalingrad, Kursk, and in the Belorussian Offensive. With 5th Army of the RVGK in May 1945.
