= 99th Guards Rifle Division =

14th Guards Airborne Division (23 Dec 1943 – 19 Jan 1944) 99th Guards Rifle Division (19 Jan 1944 – June 1946) 99th Guards Airborne Division (7 June 1946 – 4 May 1956)
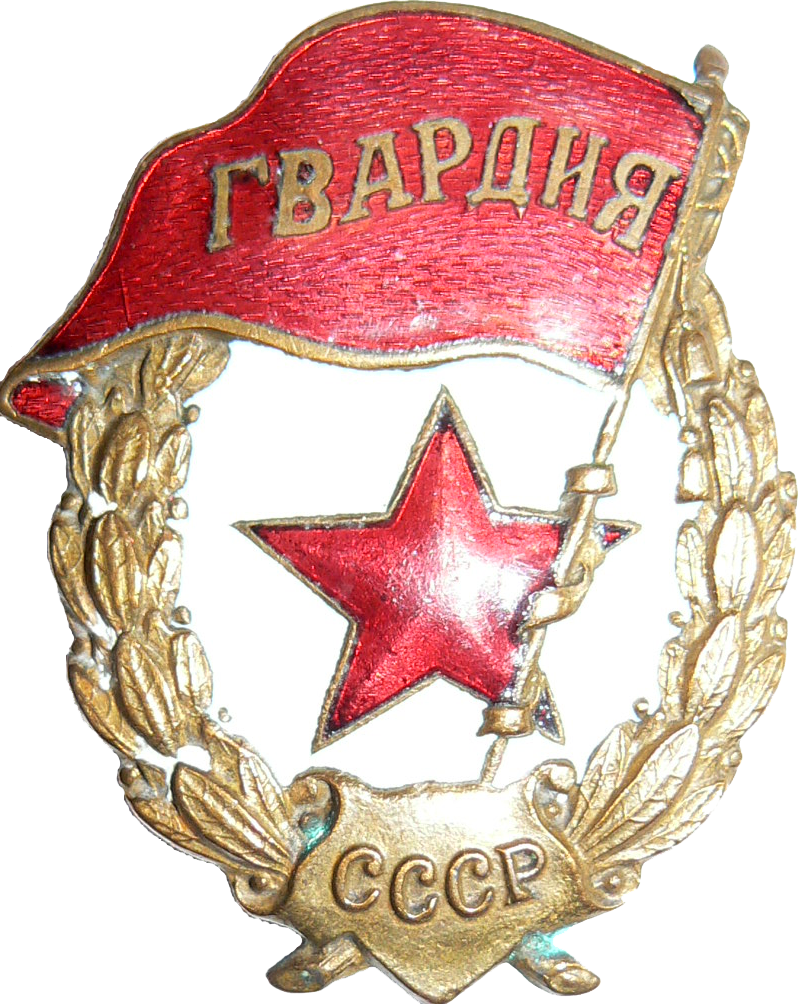
- Active: 1943–1956
- Country: Soviet Union
- Branch: Red Army (1943–1946); Soviet Airborne Troops (1946–1956)
- Type: Airborne infantry
- Engagements: World War II; Vyborg-Petrozavodsk Offensive; Budapest Offensive; Operation Spring Awakening; Prague Offensive
- Decorations: Order of Kutuzov, 2nd class
- Battle honours: Svir

Commanders
- Notable commanders: Ivan Blazhevich

The 99th Guards Rifle Division was a Red Army division of World War II. It was formed from the 14th Guards Airborne Division in January 1944. It fought in the Svir-Petrozavodsk Offensive between June and August 1944. It became the 99th Guards Airborne Division in August but was converted into infantry again in December 1944 and January 1945. The division fought in the Budapest Offensive and in the defense against Operation Spring Awakening. At the end of the war it participated in the Vienna Offensive and the Prague Offensive. In August 1945 it transferred to the Far East and was converted into an airborne division in 1946. The division served in the Far East for the next decade and was disbanded in 1956.

== History ==
The 99th Guards Rifle Division was formed from the 14th Guards Airborne Division on 19 January 1944. The 14th Guards Airborne Division had been formed on 23 December 1943 from the 6th Guards Airborne Brigade, the 13th Guards Airborne Brigade and the 15th Guards Airborne Brigade.

Prior to June 1944, it was stationed in the Moscow Military District, but was transferred to the line of the Svir to fight in the Svir-Petrozavodsk Operation. On 21 June 1944, the division crossed the Svir and breaking through the Finnish defences, seized its objectives. On 25 June, it captured the strongpoint of Kuytezha. During the river crossing, the division supported the 275th Separate Motorized Battalion of Special Forces and the 92nd Independent Tank Regiment, which utilized the T-37A amphibious tank, in the last such use of tanks in the war. On the same day, the division captured the strongholds of Pirkinichi and Semenovschinu. The division advanced to the north to Svirstroy and prevented the Finnish from blowing up a dam.

On 15 July 1944, the division, supported by the 29th Tank Brigade, attacked. After the Finnish troops were partially routed, 460 soldiers from the division were surrounded after advancing too far and killed or captured. On 9 August, the division was put in reserve near Orsha. On 9 August it became the 99th Guards Airborne Division.

From 29 December 1944 to 5 January 1945, the division was reorganised as the 99th Guards Rifle Division in the Belorussian Military District in accordance with Stavka VGK Prikaz 0047 of 18 December 1944.

In January 1945, the division was transferred to Hungary and was positioned southeast of Budapest . On 13 March 1945, it repulsed the German counterattack during Operation Spring Awakening. During the Vienna Offensive, it broke through the German defences north of Székesfehérvár, into the 6th Panzer Army's rear area, penetrating the German line between Lake Velence and Lake Balaton.

On 29 March it fought in the capture of Szombathely. In early April, in conjunction with the 6th Guards Tank Army, it advanced to the Danube, cutting of German escape routes to the west. On 1 April 1945 it was on the outskirts of Wiener Neustadt, on 2 April in Baden bei Wien. The division fought in the Vienna Offensive until 13 April. On 8 May, it captured Znojmo. The division advanced to the Elbe and in May was in the area of Mlaka in Czechoslovakia. In August 1945, the division was transferred to the Transbaikal Military District.

The 99th Guards Rifle Division was disbanded in early June 1946, probably at Manzovka, Primorskiy Krai, in the Soviet Far East, and reorganised as the 99th Guards Airborne Division of the 37th Guards Airborne Corps. In 1953 the 196th Guards Airborne Regiment was formed as part of the division. The 99th Guards Airborne Division was disbanded on 4 May 1956. Its 300th Guards Airborne Regiment and 74th Guards Artillery Regiment transferred to the 98th Guards Airborne Division.

== Composition ==
- 297th Guards Rifle Regiment (former 6th Guards Airborne Brigade)
- 300th Guards Rifle Regiment (former 13th Guards Airborne Brigade)
- 303rd Guards Rifle Regiment (former 15th Guards Airborne Brigade)
- 239th Guards Artillery Regiment
- 371st Guards Self-propelled Artillery Regiment
- 54th Guards Divisional Artillery Brigade (from 21 February 1945)
