= 13th Guards Airborne Division =

- Active: 1943–1944; 1948–1955
- Country: Soviet Union
- Branch: Soviet airborne
- Type: airborne
- Size: division
- Battle honours: Order of Kutuzov (3rd formation)

Commanders
- Notable commanders: Konstantin Vindushev

The 13th Guards Airborne Division was a division of the Soviet Airborne Troops.

Its first formation was formed in December 1943 from airborne brigades and was quickly redesignated the 98th Guards Rifle Division without seeing combat in World War II. The division was reformed in 1944 as part of the 37th Guards Airborne Corps, and was reorganized as the 103rd Guards Rifle Division within a year, again without seeing combat. The division was reformed for the third and last time in 1948. The division served in Amur Oblast in the Soviet Far East until its disbandment in 1955.

== History ==
=== First formation ===
The 13th Guards Airborne Division was first formed on 20 December 1943 from the 18th, 19th and 20th Guards Airborne Brigades, part of the Reserve of the Supreme High Command. The division included the 18, 19th, and 20th Guards Airborne Brigades, and was commanded by Colonel Konstantin Nikolaevich Vindushev. The division was redesignated as the 98th Guards Rifle Division on 19 January 1944, and became part of the 37th Guards Rifle Corps.

=== Second formation ===
The division was reformed between February and March 1944 in the Moscow Military District from the 3rd, 8th, and 21st Guards Airborne Brigades. In October, the division became part of the Separate Airborne Army's 37th Guards Airborne Corps at Teykovo, with the 3rd, 6th, and 8th Guards Airborne Brigades. The 13th Division was redesignated as the 103rd Guards Rifle Division on 18 December 1944. The division became the 103rd Guards Airborne Division on 7 June 1946 in Seltsy, Ryazan Oblast.

=== Third formation ===
The division was reformed on 15 October 1948 at Galyonki from the 296th Guards Airlanding Regiment of the 106th Guards Airborne Division, under the 37th Guards Airborne Corps. The division inherited the 296th's Order of Kutuzov. The Independent Landing Security Company was disbanded in 1949. The 116th Guards Airlanding Regiment was converted to an airborne unit at some point. On 1 June 1951, the division and its corps were relocated to Kuybyshevka-Vostochnaya. On 15 November 1953, the Separate Communications Company became the Separate Guards Communications Battalion. The Separate Medical & Sanitary Company became the Separate Medical & Sanitary Battalion on the same day. The Separate Guards Antitank Artillery Battalion and the Separate Guards Reconnaissance Company were disbanded on the same day. The division was disbanded on 25 April 1955. Its 116th Guards Airborne Regiment was transferred to the 99th Guards Airborne Division and the 217th Guards Airborne Regiment was transferred to the 98th Guards Airborne Division.

== Composition ==
The division was composed of the following units in 1948.

- 116th Guards Airlanding Regiment
- 217th Guards Airborne Regiment
- 1183rd Guards Artillery Regiment
- Separate Self-Propelled Artillery Battalion
- 100th Separate Guards Antiaircraft Artillery Battalion
- Separate Guards Antitank Artillery Battalion
- Separate Guards Reconnaissance Company
- Separate Communications Company
- Separate Guards Engineering Battalion
- Separate Supply Truck Battalion
- Separate Medical and Sanitary Company
- Separate Training Battalion

== Bibliography ==
=== References ===
- Alyohin, Roman (2009). Воздушно-десантные войска: история российского десанта [Airborne Troops: History of the Russian Paratroopers] (PDF) (in Russian). Moscow: Eksmo. ISBN 9785699332137.
- Feskov, V.I.; Golikov, V.I.; Kalashnikov, K.A.; Slugin, S.A. (2013). Вооруженные силы СССР после Второй Мировой войны: от Красной Армии к Советской [The Armed Forces of the USSR after World War II: From the Red Army to the Soviet: Part 1 Land Forces] (in Russian). Tomsk: Scientific and Technical Literature Publishing. ISBN 9785895035306.
- Glantz, David M. (1994). The History of Soviet Airborne Forces. Ilford, Essex: Frank Cass. ISBN 0714634832.
