= Vladimir Berezin (TV presenter) =

Soviet journalist

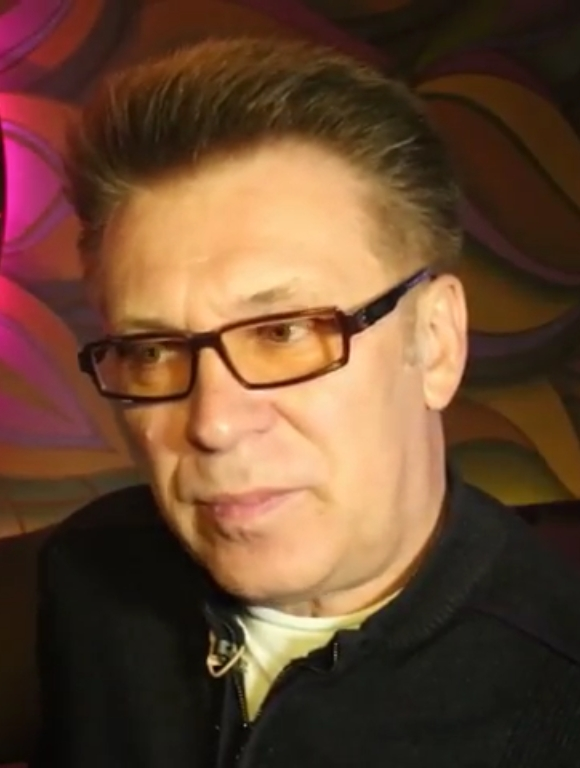
- Born: Vladimir Alexandrovich Berezin; 3 April 1957 (age 69); Oryol, RSFSR, USSR
- Education: Ural State University
- Occupations: TV presenter; journalist; actor; radio host
- Awards: Order "For Personal Courage"
- Website: v-berezin.ru

Vladimir Alexandrovich Berezin (Russian: Влади́мир Алекса́ндрович Бере́зин; born 3 April 1957, Oryol) is a Soviet and Russian actor, journalist, television and radio presenter. He was awarded the title People's Artist of Russia.

== Biography ==
Vladimir Berezin was born on 3 April 1957 in Oryol. He studied at the Orel School of Culture at the Faculty of Directing, and later at the Faculty of Journalism at Ural State University.

Already by 1980, Berezin headed the newsroom on the Sverdlovsk's TV. He stayed in this place for 10 years. It happened almost by accident even on local television Berezin noticed Boris Yeltsin, who invited him to his place in Sverdlovsk.

In the early 1990s, Berezin worked on Soviet Central Television. He was the leader of Good Morning, Good Night, Little Ones! and Vremya. Multiple announcer of the festival Slavianski Bazaar in Vitebsk.
