= Vienna offensive =

1945 Soviet invasion of Nazi-occupied Vienna, Austria during WWII

- Part of the Eastern Front of World War II
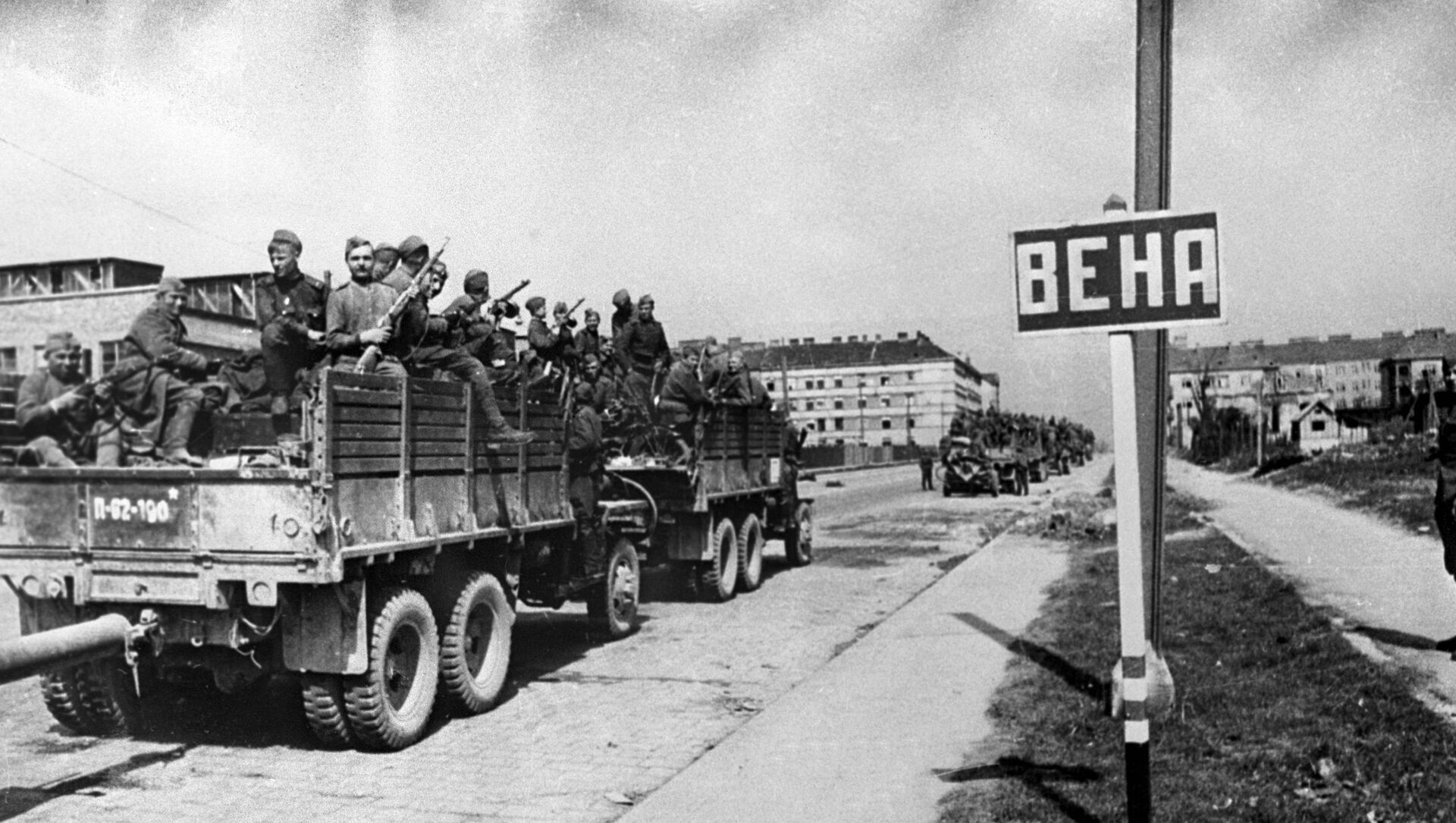
- Soviet troops on Studebaker US6 trucks during the Vienna offensive; "Vienna" is written in Russian on a signpost
Date	16 March – 15 April 1945 (4 weeks and 2 days)
Location	Vienna, Austria, Nazi Germany
Result	Allied victory

Belligerents
Germany: (Nazi Germany) State of Austria; (Kingdom of Hungary (1920–1946)) Hungary	Soviet Union; Bulgaria (Austria) Austrian resistance

Commanders and leaders
(Nazi Germany) Rudolf von Bünau (Nazi Germany) Baldur von Schirach	(Soviet Union) Fyodor Tolbukhin (Tsardom of Bulgaria (1908–1946)) Vladimir Stoychev

Strength
16 March: 25 divisions 270,000 men 772 tanks and assault guns 957 armored personnel carriers 434 guns	16 March: 77 divisions 1,171,800 men 1,600 tanks and assault guns 5,425 guns

Casualties and losses
16 March – 15 April: ~30,000 killed 125,000 captured 1,345 tanks and assault guns lost (Note: Nearly all were abandoned due to a lack of fuel. Only a fraction were destroyed in combat.); 2,250 guns and mortars lost	16 March – 15 April: 167,940 overall (including 135,000 combat casualties); 38,661+ killed 129,279 wounded or sick 603 tanks and assault guns lost 764 guns and mortars lost (Note: Site soldat.ru lists casualties of 139,815 for the 3rd Ukrainian Front and 9,805 for the 1st Bulgarian Army for the period 16 March to 15 April 1945.)

The Vienna offensive was an offensive launched by the Soviet 2nd and 3rd Ukrainian Fronts in order to capture Vienna, Austria, during World War II. The offensive lasted from 16 March to 15 April 1945. After several days of street-to-street fighting, the Soviet troops captured the city on 13 April 1945.

== Background ==
Vienna had been bombarded continuously for the year before the arrival of Soviet troops, and many buildings and facilities had been damaged or destroyed.

Joseph Stalin reached an agreement with the Western Allies prior to April 1945 concerning the relative postwar political influence of each party in much of Eastern and Central Europe; however, these agreements said virtually nothing about the fate of Austria, then officially considered to be merely the Ostmark area of Greater Germany after the Anschluss. As a result, the success of a Soviet offensive against Austria and subsequent occupation by the Red Army of a large part of the country would have been very beneficial for subsequent postwar negotiations with the Western Allies.

After the failure of Operation Spring Awakening (Unternehmen Frühlingserwachen), Sepp Dietrich's 6th SS Panzer Army retreated in stages to the Vienna area. The Germans desperately prepared defensive positions in an attempt to guard the city against the rapidly arriving Soviets.

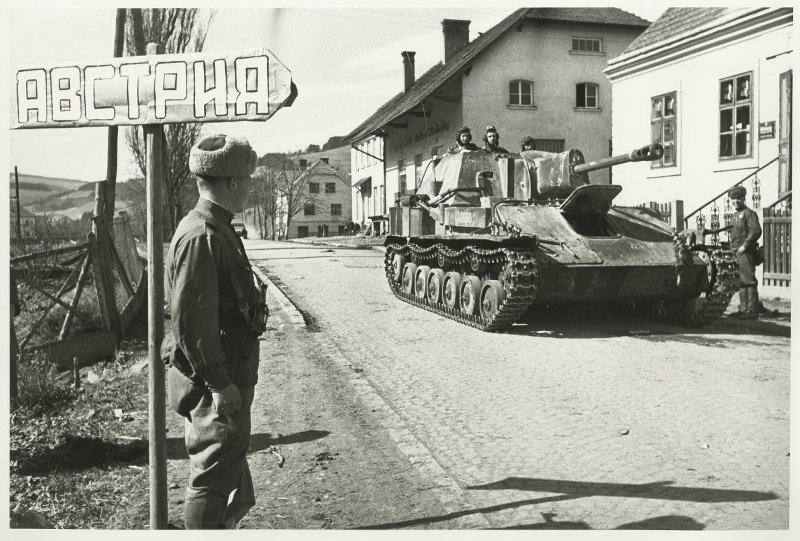
Soviet troops went on Austria.

In the spring of 1945, the advance of Soviet Marshal Fyodor Tolbukhin's 3rd Ukrainian Front through western Hungary gathered momentum on both sides of the Danube. After they took Sopron and Nagykanizsa, they crossed the border between Hungary and Austria.

On 25 March, the 2nd Ukrainian Front launched the Bratislava–Brno offensive by crossing the Hron river. On 30 March the Front crossed also the Nitra river and quickly rushed across the Danubian Lowland towards Bratislava. Having secured his right wing by 2nd Ukrainian Front, Tolbukhin was now ready to advance into Austria and take Vienna. Romanian troops, that were on the Allied side since King Michael's Coup, also took part in the offensive.

== Siege ==
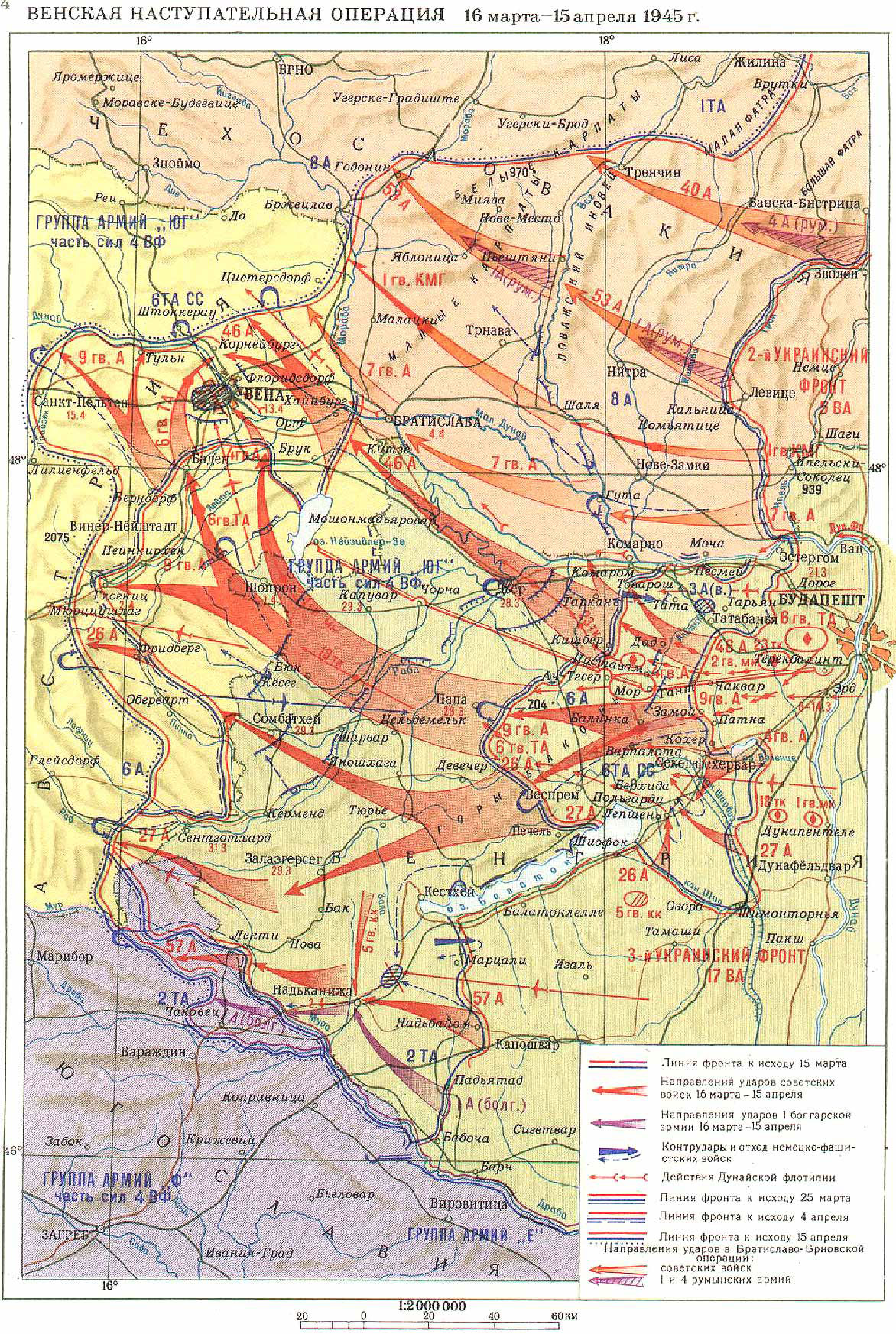
Vienna offensive

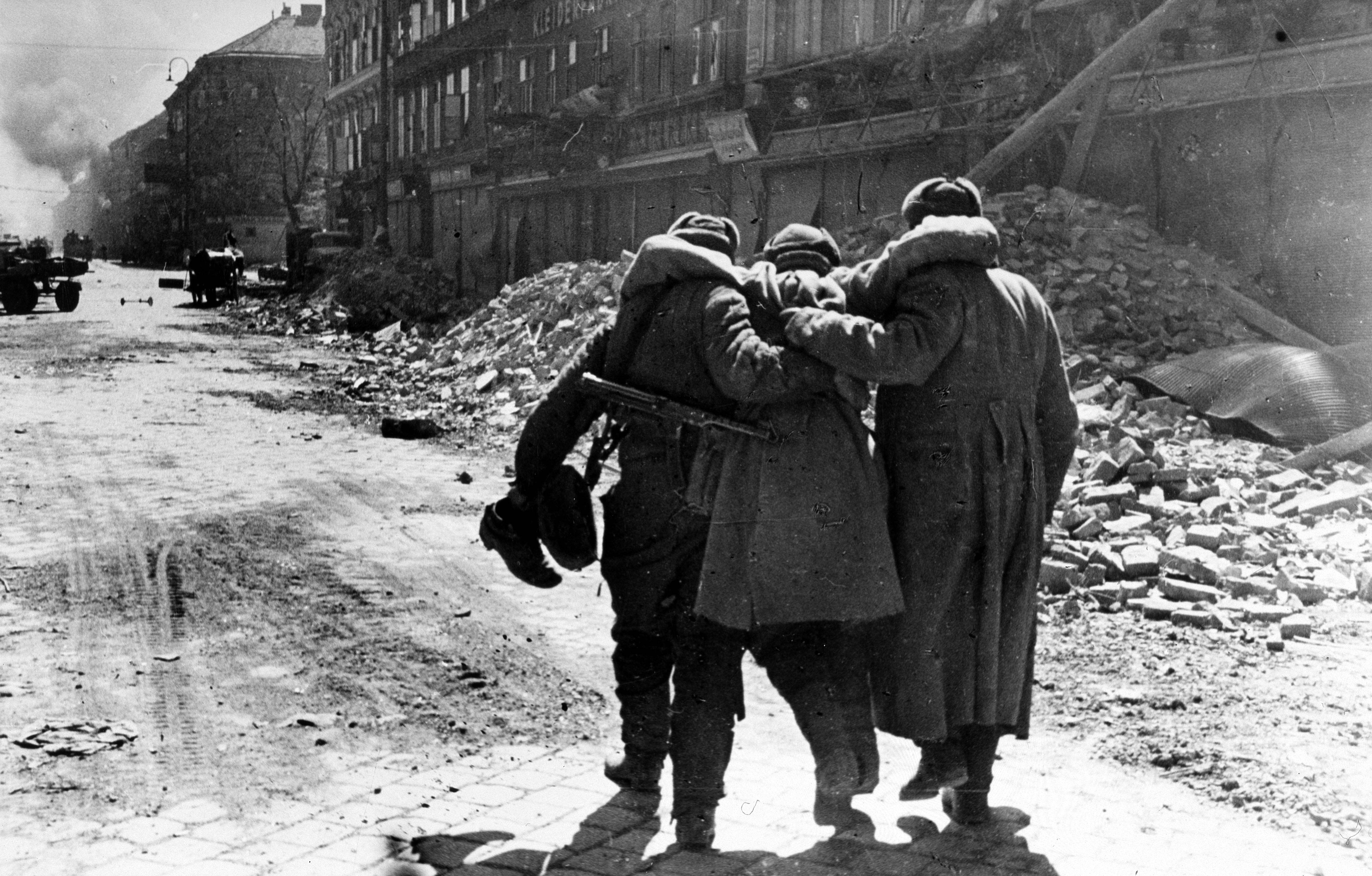
Two Red Army soldiers helping a wounded comrade walk during the fighting for the city

On 2 April, Vienna Radio denied that the Austrian capital had been declared an open city. On the same day, Soviet troops approached Vienna from the south after they overran Wiener Neustadt, Eisenstadt, Neunkirchen and Gloggnitz. Baden and Bratislava were overrun on 4 April.

After arriving in the Vienna area, the armies of the Soviet 3rd Ukrainian Front surrounded, besieged, and attacked the city. Involved in this action were the Soviet 4th Guards Army, the Soviet 6th Guards Tank Army, the Soviet 9th Guards Army, and the Soviet 46th Army. The "O-5 Resistance Group," Austrians led by Carl Szokoll, wanting to spare Vienna destruction, actively attempted to sabotage the German defenses and to aid the entry of the Red Army.

The only major German force facing the Soviet attackers was the German II SS Panzer Corps of the 6th SS Panzer Army, along with ad hoc forces made up of garrison and anti-aircraft units. Declared a defensive region, Vienna's defense was commanded by General Rudolf von Bünau, with the II SS Panzer Corps units under the command of SS General Wilhelm Bittrich.

The battle for the Austrian capital was characterized in some cases by fierce urban combat, but there were also parts of the city the Soviets advanced into with little opposition. Defending in the Prater Park was the 6th Panzer Division, along the south side of the city were the 2nd and 3rd SS Panzer Divisions, and in the north was the Führer-Grenadier Division. The Soviets assaulted Vienna's eastern and southern suburbs with the 4th Guards Army and part of the 9th Guards Army. The German defenders kept the Soviets out of the city's southern suburbs until 7 April. However, after successfully achieving several footholds in the southern suburbs, the Soviets then moved into the western suburbs of the city on 8 April with the 6th Guards Tank Army and the bulk of the 9th Guards Army. The western suburbs were especially important to the Soviets because they included Vienna's main railway station. The Soviet success in the western suburbs was followed quickly by infiltration of the eastern and northern suburbs later the same day. North of the Danube River, the 46th Army pushed westward through Vienna's northern suburbs. Central Vienna was now cut off from the rest of Austria.

By 9 April, the Soviet troops began to infiltrate the center of the city, but the street fighting continued for several more days. On the night of 11 April, the 4th Guards Army stormed the Danube canals, with the 20th Guards Rifle Corps and 1st Mechanized Corps moving on the Reichsbrücke Bridge. In a coup de main on 13 April, the Danube Flotilla landed troops of the 80th Guards Rifle Division and 7th Guards Airborne Division on both sides of the bridge, cutting demolition cables and securing the bridge. (Note: Former members of O-5 tell a different story, claiming the bridge guards were actually O-5 members who turned their machine-guns on the Germans when they attempted to destroy the bridge. Toland 1965, p. 354.) However, other important bridges were destroyed. Vienna finally fell when the last defenders in the city surrendered on the same day. (Note: Descriptions of Soviet actions are from Ustinov 1982, pp. 238–239.) Bittrich's II SS Panzer Corps, however, pulled out to the west on the evening of 13 April to avoid encirclement. The same day, the 46th Army took Essling and the Danube Flotilla landed naval infantry up the river by Klosterneuburg.

While the street fighting was still intensifying in the southern and western suburbs of Vienna on 8 April, other troops of the 3rd Ukrainian Front by-passed Vienna altogether and advanced on Linz and Graz.

On 10 April, all but two of the bridges in the city had been destroyed. The Floridsdorf bridge had been left intact by a Führer Order dictating that the bridge be held at all costs. The 2nd SS Panzer "Das Reich" left a dozen artillery pieces including 37mm anti-aircraft guns to hold off enemy attacks. That night, the "Das Reich", including their last remaining three dozen armored vehicles, pulled out of the city for the last time. Vienna had fallen, and the Germans now moved northwest to hold the next defensive line.

== Aftermath ==
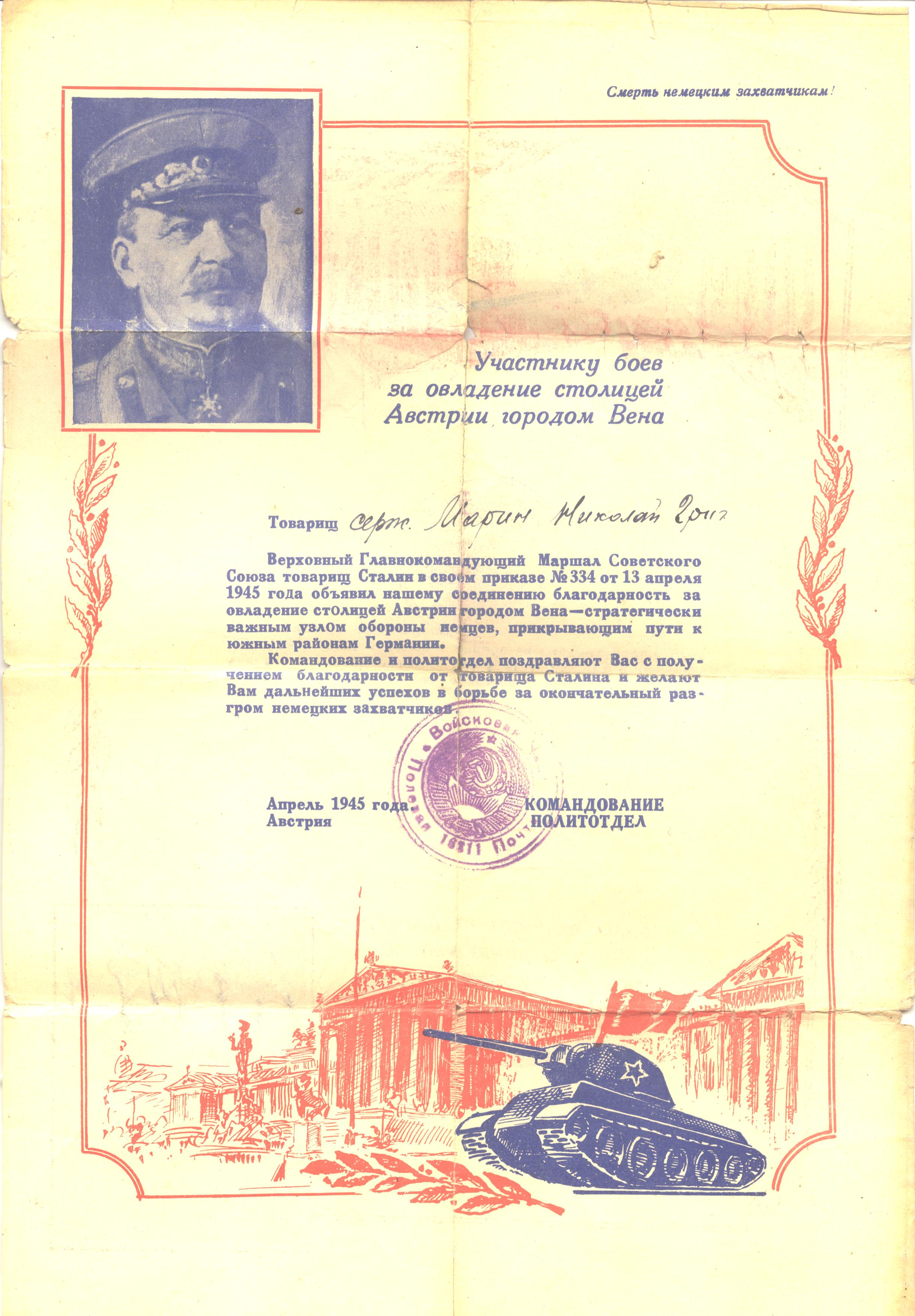
Stalin's gratitude to one of the participants of the offensive

By 15 April, armies of the Soviet 3rd Ukrainian Front pushed even further into Austria. The completely exhausted remnants of what had been the 6th SS Panzer Army were forced to flee to the area between Vienna and Linz. In pursuit of the retreating Germans were elements of the Soviet 9th Guards Army and the Soviet 46th Army. The 26th Army and 27th Armies advanced towards the area north of Graz just behind the retreating 6th Army. The 57th Army and the Bulgarian 1st Army advanced towards the area south of Graz (near Maribor) just behind the retreating 2nd Panzer Army. None of these German armies were in any shape to do more than temporarily stall the advancing Soviet forces.

Some of Vienna's finest buildings lay in ruins after the battle. There was no water, electricity, or gas — and bands of people, both foreigners and Austrians, plundered and assaulted the helpless residents in the absence of a police force. While the Soviet assault forces generally behaved well, the second wave of Soviet troops to arrive in the city were reportedly badly undisciplined. A large number of lootings and cases of rape took place in a several-week long violence that has been compared to the worst aspects of the Thirty Years War.

Like Bittrich, General von Bünau left Vienna before it fell to avoid capture by the Soviets. From 16 April until the war's end, he led Generalkommando von Bünau, surrendering to the Americans on VE Day. Von Bünau was held as a POW until April 1947. Bittrich also surrendered to U.S. forces and was held as a prisoner by the Allies until 1954. Fyodor Tolbukhin went on to command the Soviet Southern Group of Forces and the Transcaucasian Military District until his death in 1949.

Austrian politician Karl Renner set up a Provisional Government in Vienna sometime in April with the tacit approval of the victorious Soviet forces, and declared Austria's secession from the Third Reich.

There was the Medal "For the Capture of Vienna" given out to those that fought in the battle.

=== Final orders of battle (after the Vienna offensive) ===
==== Axis forces ====
On 30 April, the following order of battle was recorded by the German Army High Command (Oberkommando der Wehrmacht, or OKW). From 20 April-2 May, OKW moved from Zossen (near Berlin) to Mürwik (part of Flensburg in north Germany, near Denmark). This order of battle shows what remained "on paper" of the German armies that fought in Hungary and Austria.

- German 6th Panzer Army – east of Linz
  - I SS Panzer Corps
    - 1st SS Panzer Division
    - 12th SS Panzer Division
    - 37th SS Volunteer Cavalry Division
    - 710th Infantry division
    - 356th Infantry division
  - II SS Panzer Corps
    - 3rd SS Panzer Division
    - 2nd SS Panzer Division
    - 9th SS Panzer Division
    - Führer Grenadier Division
    - 6th Panzer Division
    - Hungarian 1st Hussar Division
    - Hungarian 1st Mountain Brigade
- German 6th Army – north of Graz
    - 9th Mountain Division (near Semmering)
    - 117th Jäger Division (arriving 12 April)
  - III Panzer Corps
    - 1st Mountain Division
    - 1st Panzer Division
  - IV SS Panzer Corps
    - 3rd Panzer Division
    - 5th SS Panzer Division
    - 14th SS Grenadier Division
- Elements of the Wehrkreiskommando XVIII (Military District XVIII)
- German 2nd Panzer Army – south of Graz (near Maribor)
  - I Cavalry Corps
    - 23rd Panzer Division
    - 4th Cavalry Division
    - 3rd Cavalry Division
    - 16th SS Panzergrenadier Division
  - XXII Mountain Corps
    - Hungarian Szent László Infantry Division
    - 118th Jäger Division
    - 297th Infantry Division
    - 711th Infantry Division
  - LXVIII Corps
    - 71st Infantry Division
    - 13th SS Alpine Division

==== Soviet and Allied forces ====
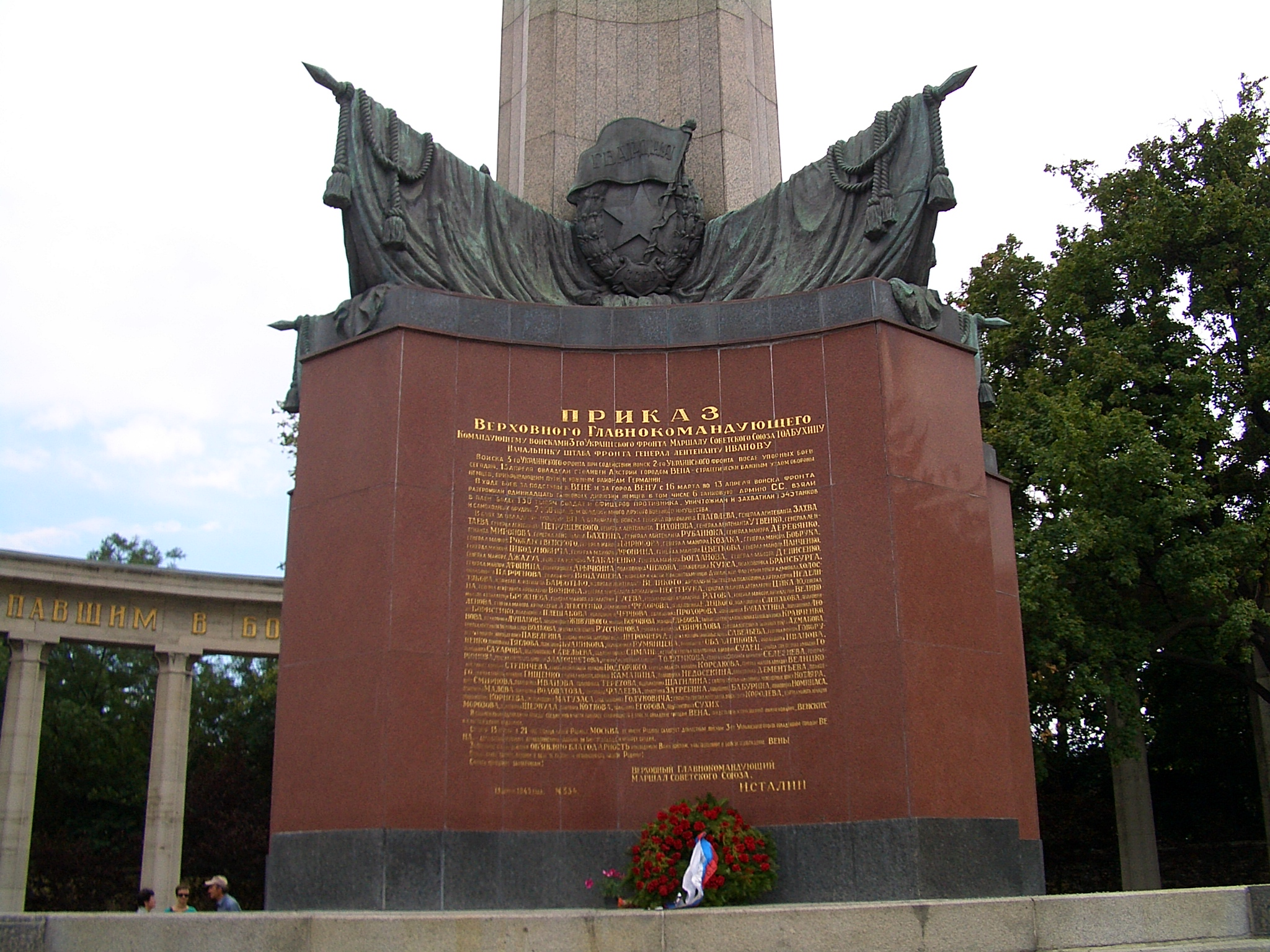
Stalin's order congratulating the units that had participated in the Vienna offensive is engraved on the Red Army Monument (Heldendenkmal der Roten Armee) that was erected by the Soviet authorities later in 1945.

The order of battle for the 3rd Ukrainian Front during the same period was:

- 4th Guards Army
  - 20th Guards Rifle Corps
    - 5th Guards Airborne Division
    - 7th Guards Airborne Division
    - 80th Guards Rifle Division
  - 21st Guards Rifle Corps
    - 41st Guards Rifle Division
    - 62nd Guards Rifle Division
    - 66th Guards Rifle Division
    - 69th Guards Rifle Division
  - 31st Guards Rifle Corps
    - 4th Guards Rifle Division
    - 34th Guards Rifle Division
    - 40th Guards Rifle Division
- 6th Guards Tank Army
  - 5th Guards Tank Corps
  - 9th Guards Mechanized Corps
- 9th Guards Army
  - 37th Guards Rifle Corps
    - 98th Guards Rifle Division
    - 99th Guards Rifle Division
    - 103rd Guards Rifle Division
  - 38th Guards Rifle Corps
    - 104th Guards Rifle Division
    - 105th Guards Rifle Division
    - 106th Guards Rifle Division
  - 39th Guards Rifle Corps
    - 100th Guards Rifle Division
    - 107th Guards Rifle Division
    - 114th Guards Rifle Division
- 26th Army
  - 30th Rifle Corps
    - 36th Guards Rifle Division
    - 68th Guards Rifle Division
    - 21st Rifle Division
  - 104th Rifle Corps
    - 74th Rifle Division
    - 93rd Rifle Division
    - 151st Rifle Division
  - 135th Rifle Corps
    - 233rd Rifle Division
    - 236th Rifle Division

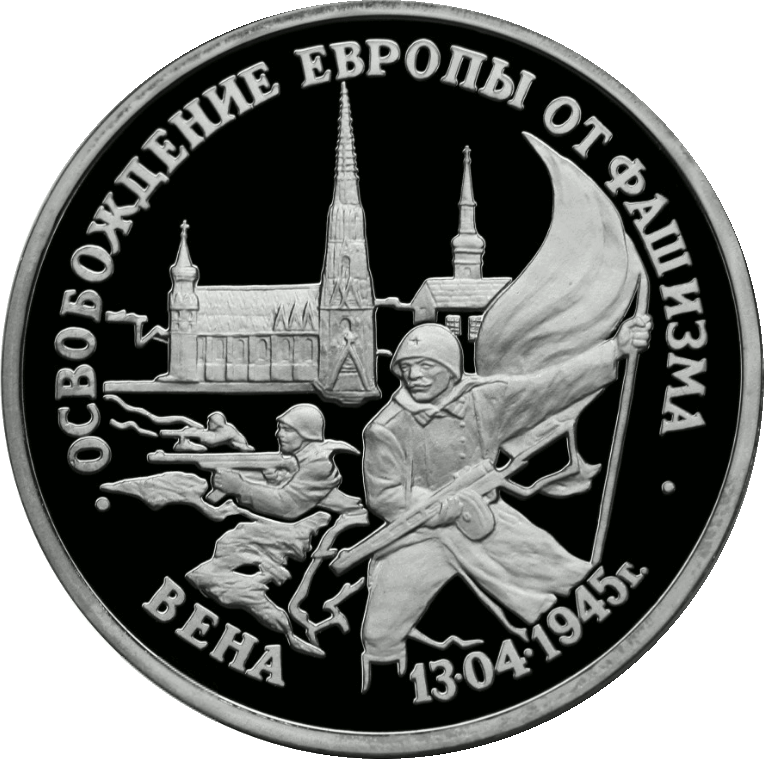
Bank of Russia commemorative coin celebrating the 50th anniversary of victory in the Great Patriotic War and the liberation of Vienna

- 27th Army
  - 35th Guards Rifle Corps
    - Guards Airborne Division
    - 163rd Rifle Division
    - 202nd Rifle Division
  - 33rd Rifle Corps
    - 78th Rifle Division
    - 155th Rifle Division
    - 206th Rifle Division
    - 337th Rifle Division
  - 37th Rifle Corps
    - 108th Guards Rifle Division
    - 316th Rifle Division
    - 320th Rifle Division
- 57th Army
  - 6th Guards Rifle Corps
    - 10th Guards Airborne Division
    - 20th Guards Rifle Division
    - 61st Guards Rifle Division
  - 64th Rifle Corps
    - 73rd Guards Rifle Division
    - 113th Rifle Division
    - 299th Rifle Division
  - 133rd Rifle Corps
    - 84th Rifle Division
    - 104th Rifle Division
    - 122nd Rifle Division
- 17th Air Army
- 5th Guards Cavalry Corps
- 1st Guards Mechanized Corps
- 18th Tank Corps
- 2nd Breakthrough Artillery Corps
  - 9th Breakthrough Artillery Division
  - 19th Breakthrough Artillery Division
  - 7th Breakthrough Artillery Division
- 3rd Anti-aircraft Artillery Division
- 4th Anti-aircraft Artillery Division
- 9th Anti-aircraft Artillery Division
- 22nd Anti-aircraft Artillery Division
- 1st Bulgarian Army
  - III Corps
    - 10th Infantry Division
    - 12th Infantry Division
    - 16th Infantry Division
  - IV Corps
    - 3rd Infantry Division
    - 8th Infantry Division
    - 11th Infantry Division
  - 6th Infantry Division

== See also ==
- Anschluss
- Battle of Berlin
- Bombing of Vienna in World War II
- Eastern Front (World War II)
- History of Germany during World War II
- Battle of Budapest – 1944/45
- Operation Frühlingserwachen – 1945
- Battle of the Transdanubian Hills – 1945
- Nagykanizsa–Körmend offensive – 1945
- Prague offensive – 1945
- Soviet 3rd Ukrainian Front
- German 6th SS Panzer Army
- End of World War II in Europe
- Siege of Vienna (1529)
- Battle of Vienna (1683)

== Sources ==
- Beevor, Antony (2002), Berlin: The Downfall 1945, Viking-Penguin Books, ISBN 978-0-670-03041-5
- Berzhkov, Velentin Mikhailovic (1987). Страницы дипломатической истории [The History of Diplomacy]. Moskva: Международные отношения.
- Dumitru, Ion S. (1999). Tancuri în flăcări [Tanks on Fire] (in Romanian). Bucharest: Nemira. OCLC 80266325.
- Laffin, John (1995). Brassey's Dictionary of Battles. New York: Barnes and Noble. ISBN 0-7607-0767-7.
- Dollinger, Hans; Jacobsen, Hans Adolf (1968). The Decline and Fall of Nazi Germany and Imperial Japan. New York: Crown.
- Frieser, Karl-Heinz; Schmider, Klaus; Schönherr, Klaus; Schreiber, Gerhard; Ungváry, Kristián; Wegner, Bernd (2007). Die Ostfront 1943/44 – Der Krieg im Osten und an den Nebenfronten [The Eastern Front 1943–1944: The War in the East and on the Neighbouring Fronts] (in German). Vol. VIII. München: Deutsche Verlags-Anstalt. ISBN 978-3-421-06235-2.
- Gosztony, Peter (1978). Endkampf an der Donau 1944/45 (in German). Wien: Molden Taschenbuch Verlag. ISBN 3-217-05126-2.
- Johnson, Lonnie (1989). Introducing Austria. Riverside: Ariadne Press. ISBN 978-0-929497-03-7.
- Jukes, Geoffrey (2002). The Second World War (5): The Eastern Front 1941–1945. Osprey Publishing. ISBN 1-84176-391-8.
- Ustinov, D. F. (1982). Geschichte des Zweiten Welt Krieges (in German). Vol. 10. Berlin: Militärverlag der DDR.
- Toland, John (1965). The Last 100 Days. New York: Random House.
