= Tambovsky Uyezd =

Tambovsky Uyezd (Тамбовский уезд) was one of the subdivisions of the Tambov Governorate of the Russian Empire. It was situated in the central part of the governorate. Its administrative centre was Tambov.

== Demographics ==
At the time of the Russian Empire Census of 1897, Tambovsky Uyezd had a population of 422,498. Of these, 99.2% spoke Russian, 0.3% Tatar, 0.2% Polish, 0.1% Ukrainian, 0.1% Yiddish and 0.1% German as their native language.
