= Victory Day parade =

Typical military parades

Victory Day Parades
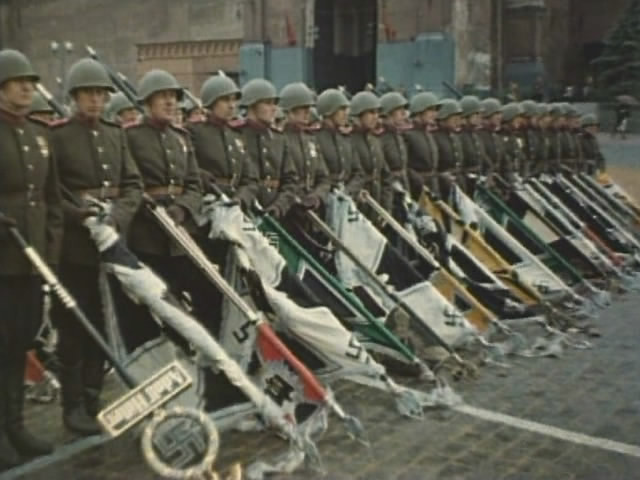
- NKVD soldiers holding captured German standards, 1945 Moscow Victory Parade
- Official name: Russian: Парад Победы; Ukrainian: Парад Перемоги; Belarusian: Парад Перамогі
- Also called: Victory Parades
- Observed by: Russia, Belarus, Ukraine, some former Soviet countries
- Observances: Moscow, Minsk, Kyiv, Astana, other cities
- Date: 9 May
- Next time: 9 May 2027
- Frequency: annual

Victory Day parades (Russian: Парад Победы, romanized: Parad Pobedy) are military parades that are held on 9 May in some post-Soviet nations, primarily Russia, Kazakhstan, Belarus and Ukraine. They are held to honor the traditional Victory Day holiday, which commemorates the German Instrument of Surrender on 8 May, 1945 (which was early midnight on 9 May in Moscow Time) and the end of the Second World War in Europe (also known as the Great Patriotic War in Russia). In 2015, the Ukrainian government renamed the holiday as "Victory Day over Nazism in World War II" as part of decommunization laws and in 2023 moved the holiday to 8 May, renaming it to Day of Remembrance and Victory over Nazism in World War II 1939 – 1945.

The People's Republic of China, once also an Eastern Bloc member until the Sino-Soviet split in 1961, also started holding decennial military parades on 3 September from 2015 onwards to commemorate the Victory over Japan Day (V-J Day). Prior to 2015, the V-J Days were commemorated every ten years, but with only civilian events and official evening galas.

== Victory parades as a holiday tradition ==
As Victory Day is the principal military holiday of Russia and of almost all member the countries of the Commonwealth of Independent States, the celebrations in Moscow and other capital cities serve as national events to mark the important holiday, which commemorates the anniversary of the capitulation of Nazi Germany to the Allied Powers in 1945. The annual or semiannual parades mark the Allied victory in World War II on the Eastern Front, on the same day as the signing of the German act of capitulation to the victorious Allies in Berlin, at midnight of May 9, 1945 (Soviet time), officially concluding the Second World War in Europe and northern parts of Africa.

During the entire history of the Soviet Union, only a total of four parades ever took place in Moscow and throughout the entire Soviet Union. In December 1947, the Presidium of the Supreme Soviet under Josef Stalin, decreed that May 9th (Victory Day) would become a working day, effectively making the celebrations cancelled and ceased completely.

However, on April 26, 1965, nearly twenty years after the first parade, under Leonid Brezhnev, the Presidium of the Supreme Soviet reversed the actions made in 1947, thus making May 9 a non-working holiday, this would be the first time Victory Day was made as an actual holiday. Further parades would be held in 1985 and 1990.

Until 1989 celebrations of Victory Day were held in most Warsaw Pact countries (save for East Germany, whose celebrations fell on 8 May except in 1975, when it was marked on 9 May). Of all the countries that observed it, only Czechoslovakia held celebration parades every 5 years, also in honor of the successful Prague Uprising that ended on that day in 1945. In addition, Poland and Yugoslavia (which was outside the Iron Curtain) also held occasional parades, with the former staging a massive parade in 1985 to mark the ruby jubilee anniversary and the latter following the practice of Czechoslovakia of parades every 5th anniversary beginning with the 20th anniversary in 1965.

In 2020, many of the traditional parades were cancelled, with the only ones being held in Belarus and Turkmenistan. The main parade in Russia, as well as parades in Kazakhstan and Kyrgyzstan were cancelled as a result of the COVID-19 pandemic. In response to these massive cancellations, World Health Organization regional director for Europe Hans Kluge referred to these cancellations as "a brave decision", highlighting their holiday significance.

=== Purpose ===
According to Russian anthropologist Sergey Ushakin, modern victory parades are intended to demonstrate the direct and immediate connection of the present with the past and to materialize the connection between generations. General Oleg Salyukov, who has commanded the parade for close to a decade, described them in an interview with TASS as a "celebration for people, not show of militarism", referring to accusations of the parade being used as show of Russian military might.

== Parades in the Russian Federation ==
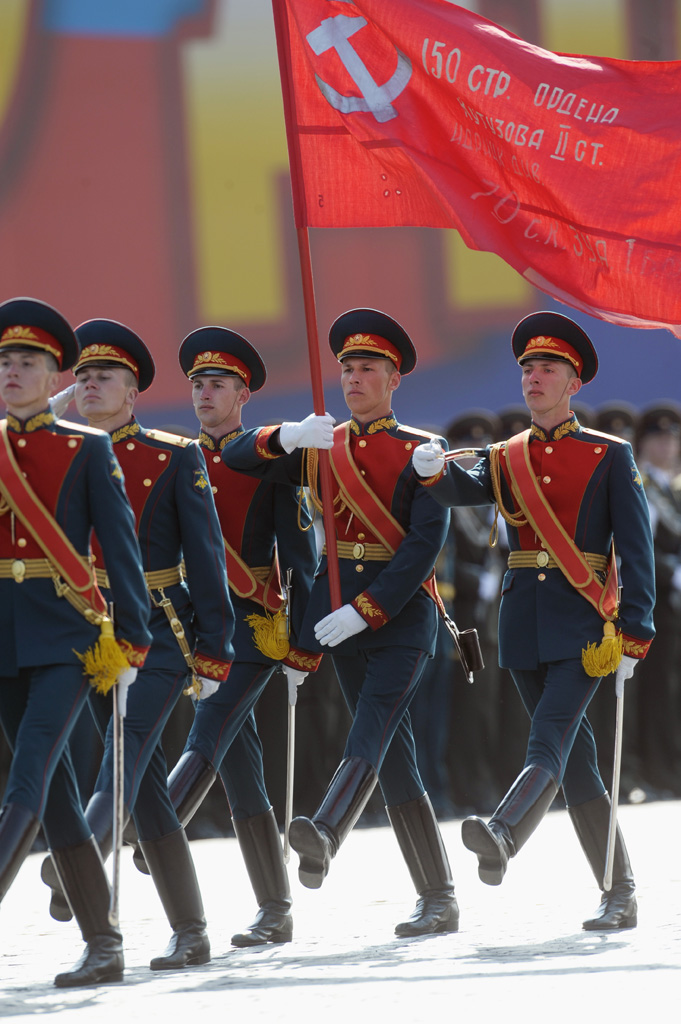
The 2008 Moscow Victory Day Parade

Today, Russia, as the largest of the countries of the former Soviet Union, continues the practice of parades held in honor of the victory won in the Great Patriotic War – the Eastern Front of the Second World War as called by the Soviet Union. The first of these parades was held in 1995 (5 years after the fall of the Soviet Union) under the auspices of President Boris Yeltsin, who held the parade to commemorate the golden jubilee of the Soviet and allied victory in the war. The parade was the only one to date that had to be divided into two parts (a full military parade on Poklonnaya Hill and a veterans ceremony on Red Square).

=== Red Square, Moscow ===
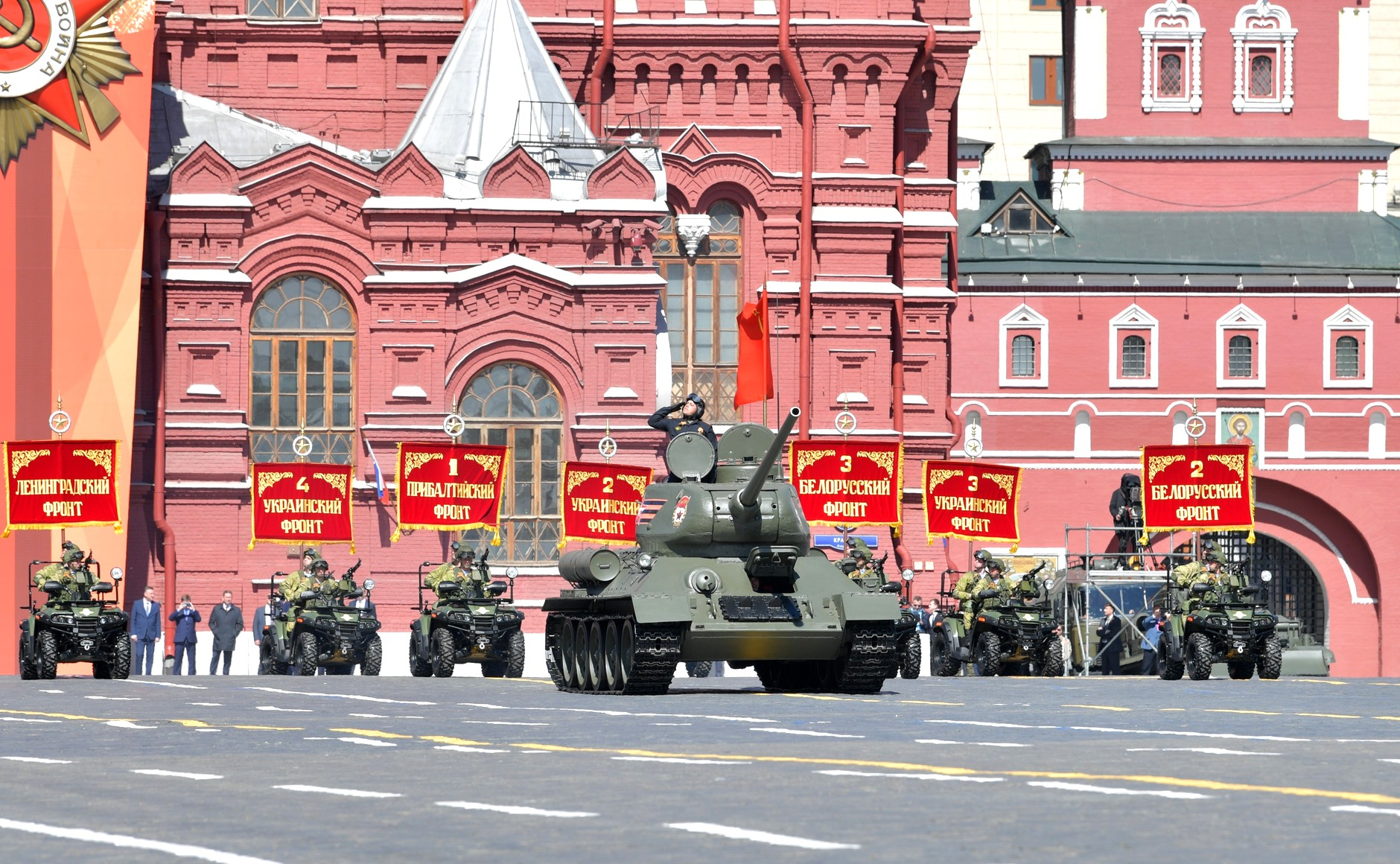
The 2018 Moscow Victory Day Parade

The most important parade of those being held on May 9 is the one held on Moscow's Red Square, with the President of Russia as the guest of honor and keynote speaker in virtue of his constitutional mandate as Supreme Commander of the Russian Armed Forces. On the morning of the day, an estimated 14,000 military personnel, including a regiment of female cadets and youth cadets, assemble by battalions on the square together with the Massed Bands of around 1,100 bandsmen under the direction of the Senior Director of Music of the Military Band Service of the Armed Forces of Russia (an appointment bestowed to either a colonel or a general rank officer), together with more than 210 vehicles and 3,800 vehicle crews assembled on Tverskaya Street just north of the Manezhnaya Square, Moscow, during the major parades a battalion or company of historical Red Army vehicles, estimated at around 36 vehicles and composed of just the T-34, GAZ-67 and the SU-100 plus the optional BM-13N (or at around an estimated 480 when counting other vehicles of the war which would take part just like in the parades of 1985 and 1990) assemble on the street as well with modern military hardware of the Armed Forces and the National Guard (and optionally by the other uniformed organizations). Each of the contingents, since 1996, carry historical military colors of the 1942 (Red Army, Soviet Air Force, People's Militia) and 1932–1944 (Navy) patterns at the head of their formations honoring the millions of men and women who served in the ranks of the military and law enforcement services of the former Soviet Union during the long period of the Eastern Front of the Second World War, and the millions among them who were either killed or were missing in action.

The celebrations begin at 9:55 am Moscow Standard Time with the arrival of the President and the Prime Minister of Russia to a special grandstand in front of Lenin's Mausoleum, where six of the past parades were reviewed by national leaders. They greet the Chief of the General Staff of the Armed Forces, service commanders, deputy ministers in the Ministry of Defence and commanders of the support units within the Armed Forces, together with veterans, veterans' families and representatives of the Suvorov and Nakhimov Schools assembled. To the left and right of the grandstand are the stands wherein veterans, veterans' families, and descendants and families of personnel killed in action are gathered. In between the grandstand to the south of the stands are two platoons of armed linemen and markers from the 154th Preobrazhensky Independent Commandant's Regiment in the Imperial-styled military uniforms and some unarmed half-companies of the Kremlin Regiment, both of which would be later taking post to mark the distance of the troops marching past and to line the square's western side facing the Kremlin together with extra drum majors from the Band Service, which are there to coordinate the march past to be timed in with the music of the bands since the parade of 1995.

As the Spasskaya Tower of the Kremlin sounds the chimes at 10 am the parade commander orders the parade to present arms as the 154th PICR's 1st Honor Guard Company Colour Guard, to the melody of The Sacred War being played by the Massed Bands, marches into the square and past the dignitaries with guard carrying both the Flag of Russia and the Victory Banner. As the colour guards approach the grandstand, the colour officers execute eyes left and resume above face after passing by. This is followed by the parade being commanded to stand at ease after the colours take their place at the northwest end of the square fronting the State Historical Museum, besides the colour of the Armed Forces. Then the Minister of Defence (usually a billet of a General of the Army) is driven on the limousine to the center of the square nearest the tribune, the parade presenting arms again at this point. The parade commander informs him of the readiness of the parade to be inspected. The report is received, and to the tune of the Massed Bands, the Minister and the parade commander are driven to inspect the parading contingents each together with the bands. As the limousines stop the Minister sends Victory Day greetings to each of the parading contingents, in which they respond with a threefold loud Oorah that is heard all over the grounds. After the final greeting, the Massed Bands strike up to Slavsya from A Life for the Tsar as the PC returns to his place, the Minister driven to the grandstand amidst loud shouts of Oorah by the parade contingents where he dismounts the limousine and the Corps of Drums of the Moscow Military Music College, an affiliate of the Suvorov Military Schools, take their place behind the parade commander's car led by the Commandant of the college and the college colour guard. The parade is ordered to stand at ease after the Minister informs the President that the parade is formed up for the march past in review and its inspection officially completed. In 1965, 1985 and 1990 parades, the limousines would inspect the personnel of the mobile column at the Manezhnaya Square formed into battalions, in remembrance of the mounted inspection of the original 1945 parade, which included cavalry, tachankas and horse artillery in addition to the huge mobile column. Following the report of the Minister of Defence, the keynote holiday address to the nation of the President follows, preceded by a fanfare by the Massed Bands, usually Govovin's Moscow Fanfare.

As the president finishes the address and a threefold Oorah resounds all over the square by the entire parade assembled and the honor guard presents arms, the Massed Bands play the National Anthem of Russia and a ceremonial battery armed with the 76 mm divisional gun M1942 (ZiS-3) fire a 21-gun salute. As the anthem ends, the bands sound Retreat as the honor guard executes order arms and the parade commander orders the parade to commence the march past in the following manner:

Parade... attention! Ceremonial march past!
Form battalions! Distance by a single lineman! First battalion will remain in the right, remainder... left.. turn!
Slope.. arms!

When the command is given, the linemen and the field markers take their places at the south end of the square. As the parade commander ends the commands with Eyes to the right, forward, quick march!, the Corps of Drums of the Moscow Military Music College, by a tradition dating from 1938, marches first, its drummers and fifers playing "General Miloradovich" by one of the college's alumni, the late Lieutenant General Valery Khalilov, Senior Director of Music of the Military Band Service and conductor of the Moscow massed bands from 2002 to 2016. When the massed bands begin to play, the Corps of Drums stops at the signal of the Corps Drum Major and swings its drumsticks during the eyes right. The Corps is followed by the colour guard of the 154th PICR and its 1st Honor Guard Company. During jubilee parades, the colour guard is followed by a company of colour bearers carrying the front standards, in the order in which they marched past in the 1945 Victory Parade, with their escorts; by the colours of the regiments, brigades and divisions that took part in the 1945 parade; by a historical unit of servicemen in period uniforms, sometimes joined by the Kuban Cossacks in memory of their contingent in that parade; and by the Escort Cavalry Squadron of the Kremlin Regiment and a number of international contingents.

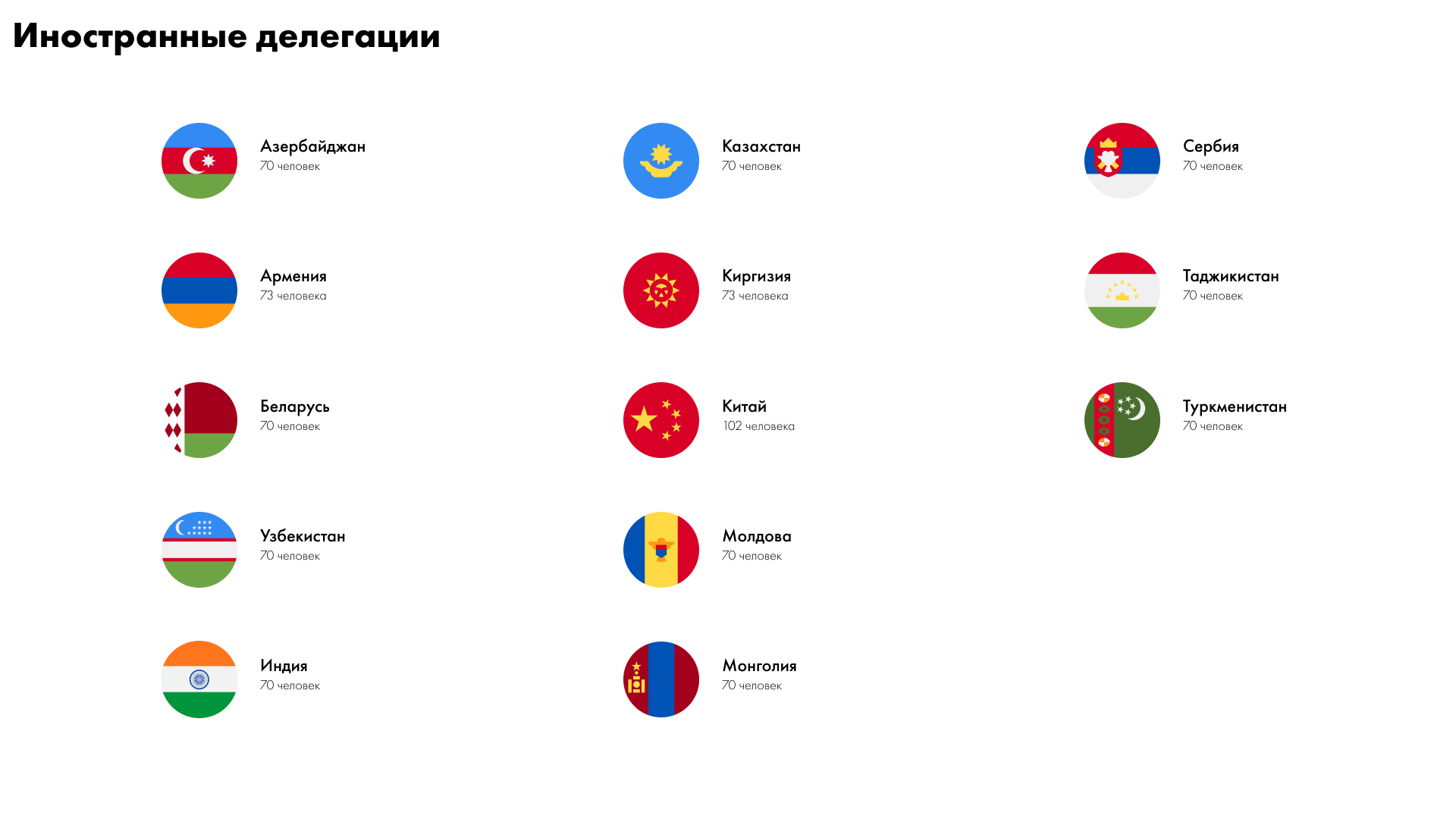
A schematic of the foreign troops in the 2020 Moscow Victory Day Parade

Once the ground column ends, the bands stop playing and, to give way to the mobile column by marching towards the facade of the GUM department store. The mobile column starts with the drive past of historical vehicles in jubilee years and only a T-34/85 medium battle tank carrying the Victory Banner non-special anniversary years.

=== Russian parades held outside Moscow ===
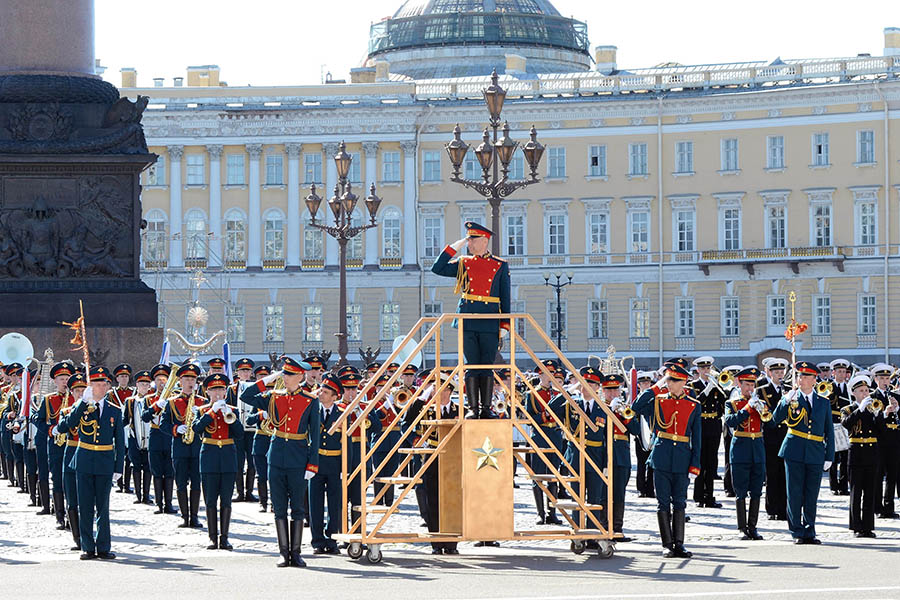
The massed bands of the St. Petersburg Garrison during the parade in 2016

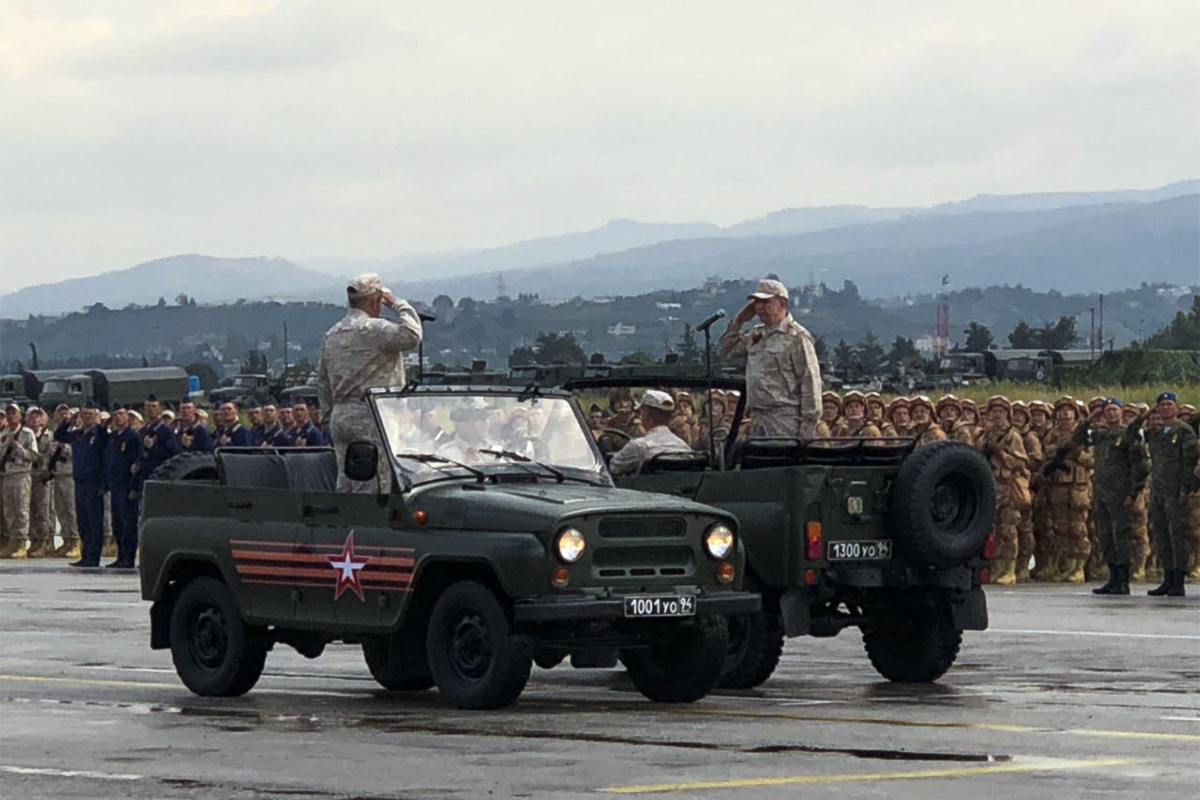
A parade at Khmeimim Air Base in Syria, 2018

As per tradition, 27 other Russian major cities (Sevastopol and Kerch in the disputed Crimea included) are expected to hold commemorative parades on that day (some of them including flypasts and fleet reviews during jubilee years), and joint civil-military parades are hosted by 50 other towns and cities nationwide. Many of these parades are modeled primarily on the Moscow parade.

The following plazas in cities outside of Moscow hold military parades:

- Palace Square (St. Petersburg)
- Soviet Square (Smolensk)
- Victory Square (Tula)
- Victory Square (Kaliningrad)
- Lenin Square (Voronezh)
- Minin and Pozharsky Square (Nizhny Novgorod)
- Five Corners (Murmansk)
- Primorskoy Square (Severomorsk)
- 1905 Square (Yekaterinburg)
- Millennium Square (Kazan)
- Lenin Square (Novosibirsk)
- Kuybyshev Square (Samara)
- Theatre Square (Rostov-on-Don)
- Square of the Fallen Fighters (Volgograd)
- Lenin Square (Novorossiysk)
- Freedom Square (Vladikavkaz)
- Lenin Square (Astrakhan)
- Lenin Square (Stavropol)
- Admiral Pavel Nakhimov Square (Sevastopol)
- Lenin Square (Kerch)
- Lenin Square (Simferopol)
- Platov Square (Novocherkassk)
- Lenin Square (Khabarovsk)
- Ship Embankment (Vladivostok)
- Central Square (Ussuriysk)
- Central Square (Belogorsk)
- Lenin Square (Chita)
- Council Square (Ulan-Ude)
- Glory Square (Yuzhno-Sakhalinsk)

Like Moscow, regional parades in recent years have included foreign troops in their parades. On the 65th anniversary in 2010, French troops took part in a parade in Murmansk while American sailors paraded in Vladivostok. This occurred once again in 2013 in Vladivostok during which American Pacific Fleet troops and sailors from the French Navy took part in the 68th anniversary parade, greeting the parade inspector in their native languages before sounding a Russian-style threefold "Ura!" Foreign cadet contingents also take part in the parade in St. Petersburg and Omsk. In 2020, it was confirmed that foreign servicemen from the armed forces of Kazakhstan, Kyrgyzstan, Tajikistan and Uzbekistan will take part in the parade in Yekaterinburg, as well an 80-man contingent from Armenia in Rostov-on-Don, plans which were later scrapped. In Ulan-Ude in 2021, a contingent of the Mongolian Armed Forces took part in the parade for the first time.

Palace Square, St. Petersburg

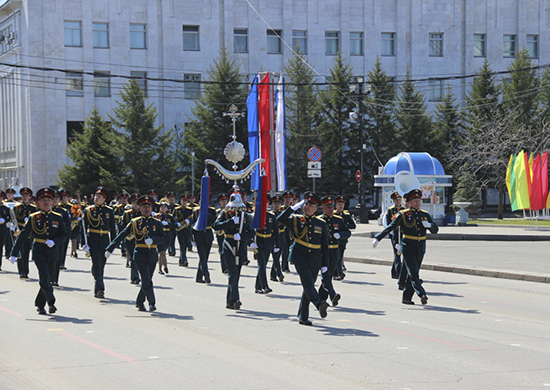
The Military Band of the Eastern Military District during a Victory Day Parade in Khabarovsk

The first Victory parade in the city was the Parade of Guards (Russian: Парад гвардейских войск) on 8 July 1945 was held in then Leningrad in the presence of at least half a million Leningraders. The parade consisted of servicemen from guards units of the Leningrad Front, all of which marched on Nevsky Prospect. On 9 May 1965, the first parade celebration of the 20th anniversary of the victory took place on the Palace Square grounds.

Ship Embankment, Vladivostok Victory Parades in Vladivostok first began in 1965. Despite this it is generally considered that the first parade in honor of the victory in Vladivostok on Svetlanskaya Street took place in 1918 dedicated to the First World War, attended by British, American and French troops. Svetlanskaya later went on to host ten victory parades, held infrequently. The traditional part of parade was reduced to the construction of areas of the central square, which resulted in parades, such as one in 2009, being held under the monument to the Red Army soldier. In 2011, the victory parade in Vladivostok moved from the central square to Ship Embankment, which was a controversial move that caused debate. Since 2012, official Victory Parades have been held annually on the street.

Lenin Square, Khabarovsk The parade in the city of Khabarovsk is the main one in the Eastern Military District. It is also unique for being the only parade wherein a Russian Orthodox Church priest blesses each of the marching contingents with holy water after marching past the dais. In 2019, the American M4 Sherman medium tank, one of the many Lend-Lease Sherman tanks supplied to the Soviet Union by the United States military industry, took part in the mobile column of the parade for the first time, after over a year of restoration work after being found by divers at the bottom of the Barents Sea. This was unprecedented, as this was the first time in years that a Lend-Lease vehicle used by the Soviet Army drove past on a regional parade in the city.

1905 Square, Yekaterinburg Unlike other cities, parades in Yekaterinburg (known in the Soviet era as Sverdlovsk) weren't held until 1975, a year when the parade in Moscow wasn't event being held despite it being a jubilee year. Another parade was held on 1905 Square in 1980. Parades returned in 1992, after the merger/creation of the Volga–Ural Military District caused large-scale parades in the region to be moved to Samara. In 2005, Yekaterinburg was one of four cities in Russia (along with Moscow, Khabarovsk and Krasnoyarsk), where heavy military equipment directly took part in the parade. The record number of military equipment participating in the parade was recorded in 2010. In 2015, aircraft were first introduced into the parade.

Lenin Square, Novorossiysk The 2021 parade in Novosibirsk was the first ever regional parade since 1990 that featured the Strategic Missile Forces' RS-24 Yars mobile ICBM system from the city-based 39th Guards Rocket Division, the first time in years that ICBMs made their appearance at the end of the mobile column segment of the parade in the city and an unprecedented decision by the parade organizers.

Kazan Kremlin The principal parade of Tatarstan, beginning 2012, has been held on the grounds of Kazan Millennium Square, outside the Kazan Kremlin, a UNESCO World Heritage Site, and at the front of Kazan Arena.

Crimea

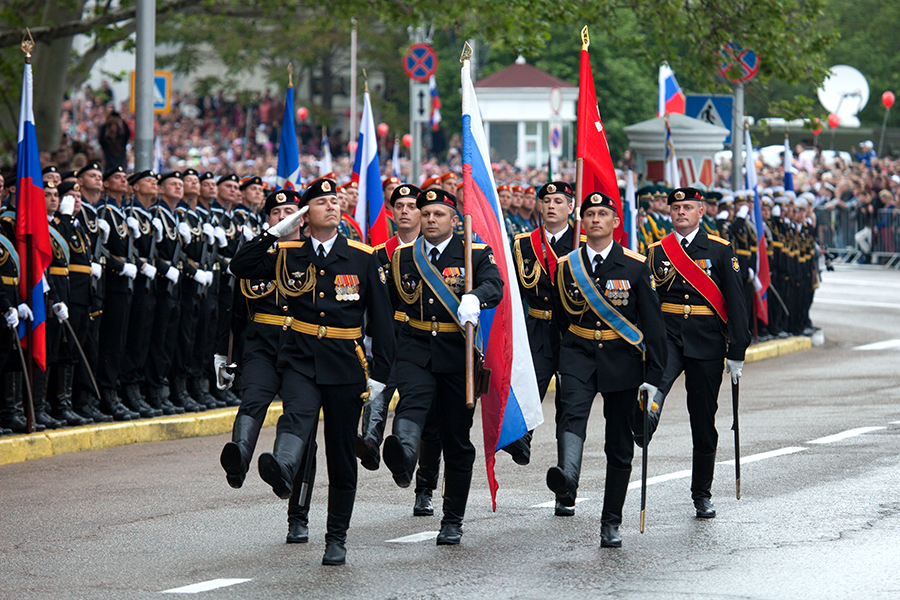
The parade in Sevastopol

Parades held in the occupied Ukrainian Republic of Crimea are spread across three cities: Sevastopol, Simferopol and Kerch. The first large-scale procession took place in 1960 at the city stadium in Simferopol. Since the 1990s, the most grandiose parades were held in Sevastopol, a Hero City. For a number of years, a joint parade of the Russian Black Sea Fleet and the Ukrainian Navy took place in the city, featuring both Ukrainian and Russian parade commanders and inspectors.

Since the 2014 Annexation of Crimea by the Russian Federation, parades have been solely held by Russia, with the first parade in May of that year commemorating the 70th anniversary of its liberation. President Vladimir Putin also visited the city to attend a fleet review after reviewing the parade in Moscow that day. No parade at all within Sevastopol, Simferopol and Kerch was held in 2025 because of Ukrainian UAV attacks on Russian military installations in the peninsula and the threat of further Ukrainian military action even targeting government facilities.

=== Russian parades outside the country ===
The following bases in foreign countries hold military parades:

- Tajikistan – Russian 201st Military Base

During the annual parade at Khmeimim Air Base in Syria, a unit from the Syrian Arab Armed Forces usually participates in the parade.

=== Incidents ===
In 2004, during a victory parade in the Chechen city of Grozny, a bomb exploded, killing 10 people including the Chechen President Akhmad Kadyrov.

== History of parades in different countries ==
=== Parades held in recognized nations ===
Armenia

Annual victory day parades in Armenia are held in Gyumri on the central square of the city, being presided by the Commander-in-Chief of the United Group of Forces and taking place with the participation of troops from the Russian 102nd Military Base, the Leninakan Border Detachment of the Federal Security Service of Russia, and military personnel of the Armed Forces of Armenia. The first one took place in 2014, after having not been held since 1993. Officials in attendance are the Governor of the Shirak Region, the Mayor of Gyumri, and the Bishop of the Diocese of Shirak. In 2015, pilots of the Russian airbase in Armenia participated in a flypast over Gyrumi and Yerevan for the first time in honor of the platinum jubilee. Because the 2020 celebrations in honor of the holiday and Shushi Liberation Day were cancelled by order of Prime Minister Nikol Pashinyan due to the COVID-19 pandemic, a fly past of the Armenian Air Force was held at the Mother Armenia monument.

Belarus

Victory parades in Belarus have dated back to Soviet parades in the former Belarusian Soviet Socialist Republic. They are usually held on jubilee years (e.g. 50th anniversary, 65th anniversary).

Czechoslovakia

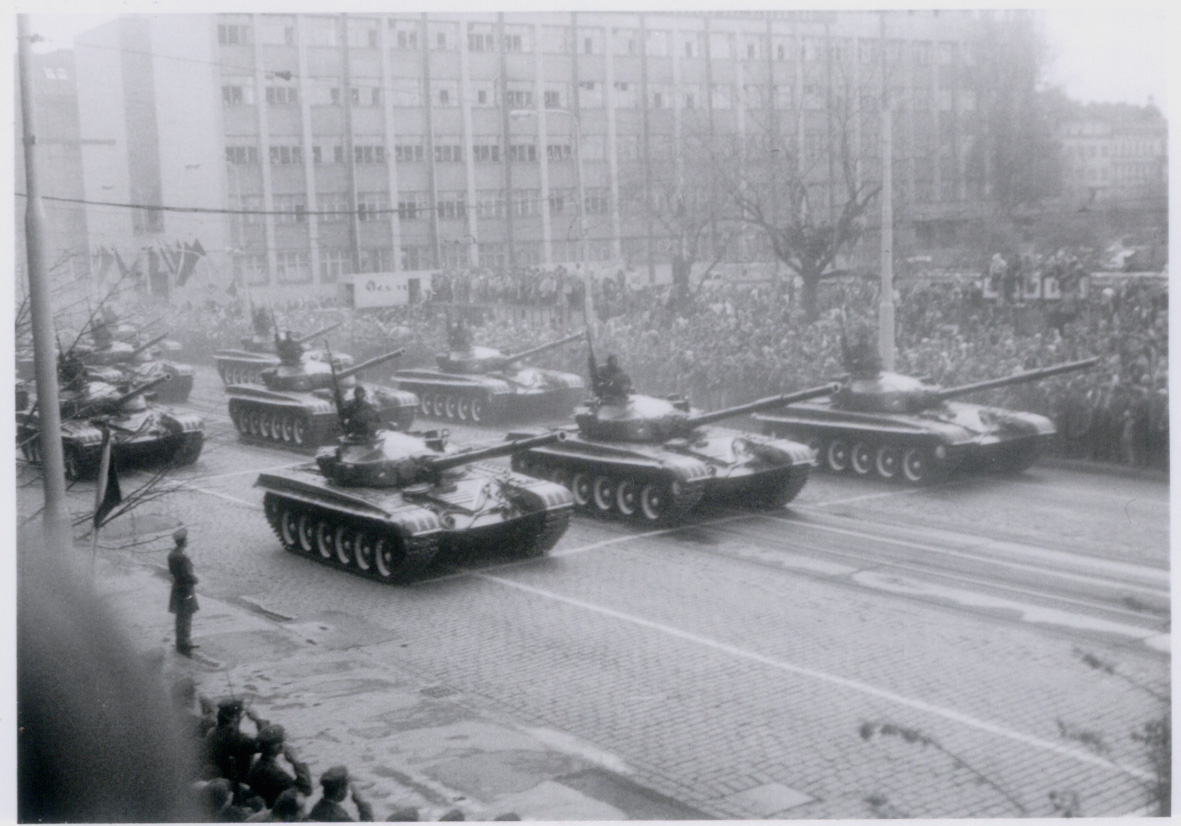
A parade of tanks of the ČSLA in Prague on Victory Day, 9 May 1985

During the period of the Czechoslovak Socialist Republic, regular victory day parades were held by the Czechoslovak People's Army (ČSLA) in Letná. The first parade took place in 1951 and have since been held every five years on 9 May up until 1990. The parade also marked the Prague uprising. The last of these parades took place in 1985. Kde domov můj and Nad Tatrou sa blýska (the Czechoslovak national anthem) was performed by the massed bands on parade before being followed by the State Anthem of the Soviet Union. Parades were also held in Bratislava and Plzeň as well.

Israel

Israel has commemorated Victory Day since it became a national holiday in 2017. As a result of the mass immigration of many Red Army veterans, Israel now hosts the largest and most extensive Victory Day celebrations outside the former Soviet space. The traditions and customs of Victory Day are the same as in Russia, with marches of Immortal Regiments held in cities with large populations of Red Army veterans and their descendants, particularly in Tel Aviv, Jerusalem and Haifa. It does not just honor all who served in the European and Mediterranean Theaters, but also particularly honors the Jewish partisans and soldiers who served in the armed forces and paramilitary formations, as well as of the civil uniformed security forces, of the Allies, whose experience would help in the formation of the current day Israel Defense Forces.

Kazakhstan

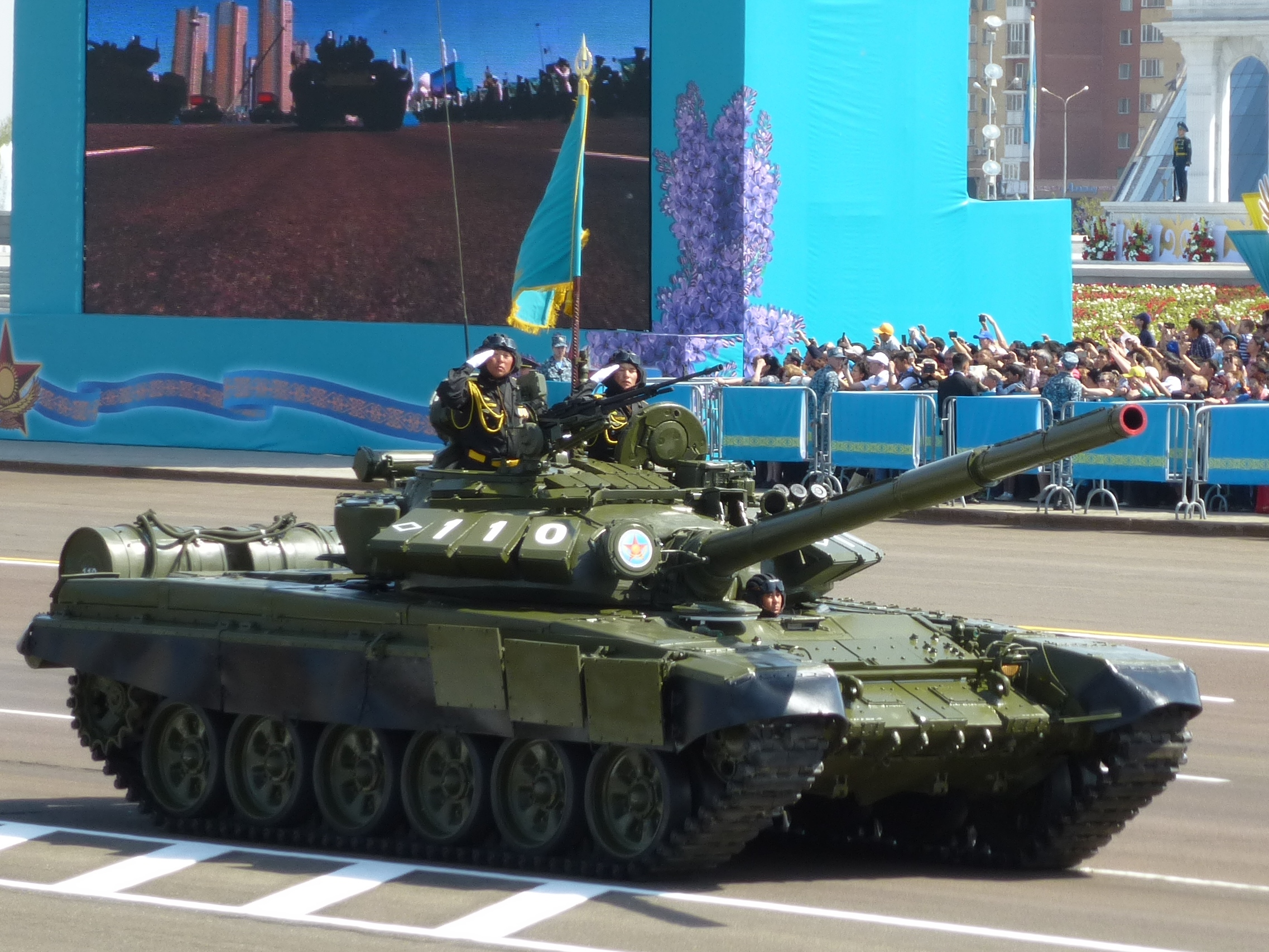
A T-72 tank during a Victory Day parade in 2015.

The first Victory Day Parade in Kazakhstan was held in 1995 in the then capital of Almaty. Celebrating the golden jubilee of the victory, it was held on Republic Square and was presided by the Minister of Defence, Army General Sagadat Nurmagambetov. Subsequent small-scale parades were held in 2000 and 2005. In 2015, a Victory Day/Defender of the Fatherland Day Parade was held on Independence Square in Nur-Sultan (then known as Astana) to celebrate the victory's platinum jubilee. As a result, most Victory Day parades are held in connection with Defender of the Fatherland Day holiday, which celebrates the founding of the Kazakh Armed Forces. In March 2020, due to the COVID-19 pandemic, President Kassym-Jomart Tokayev ordered the cancellation of that year's parade due to the ongoing COVID-19 pandemic that affected the country. On 24 June of that year, the city of Almaty held a mini Victory Parade.

In Aktau, the parade traditionally begins with the "Volley of Remembrance", fired near the Eternal Flame monument.

Kyrgyzstan

The only major Victory Day Parade in Bishkek occurred in 2015 on Ala-Too Square. It was presided by Prime Minister Temir Sariyev and Chief of General Staff Asanbek Alymkozhoev in place of President Almazbek Atambayev, who was attending the 2015 Moscow Victory Day Parade. Russian troops from the Kant Air Base also took part in the parade. In 2020, a planned parade due to be held at the same venue to mark the war's 75th anniversary was cancelled. On normal occasions, a short victory parade led by the Commander of the Bishkek Garrison is held at Victory Square.

Parades have also been held in Osh, with notable attendees including First Deputy Prime Minister Mukhammedkalyi Abylgaziev.

Moldova

On 15 April 2020, Moldovan President Igor Dodon ordered the postponement of the diamond jubilee Victory Day celebrations on 9 May, the main event of which was supposed to be the Victory Parade on Great National Assembly Square, to Liberation Day (24 August) due to the coronavirus pandemic in Moldova, marking also the 76th anniversary of the Second Jassy–Kishinev Offensive of 1944. It was expected also to mark the 29th anniversary of Moldovan independence, thus the parade was supposed to be a triple anniversary event and a prelude to the massive celebrations held in 2021 in honor of the country's 30th year of independence. The plans for the parade were cancelled in later July by order of the president due to the state mandated quarantine.

Victory parades also took place in the Soviet era.

Serbia and former Yugoslavia

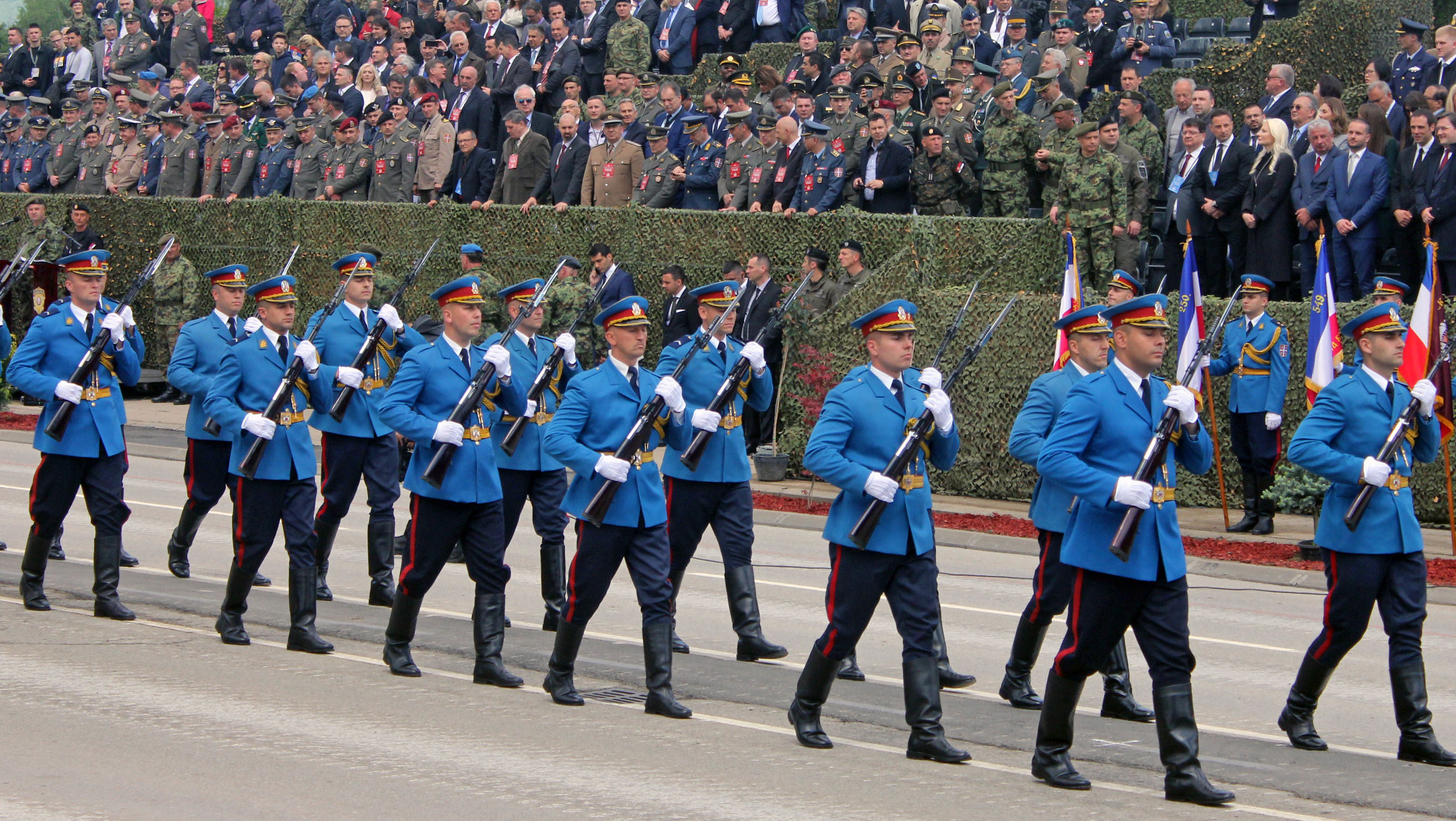
The Serbian Guards Unit during the Niš Military Parade.

Victory Day Parades in Serbia and the former Yugoslavia are held frequently, the first of which was held by the Yugoslav People's Army on Bulevar revolucije in 1965, during the 20th anniversary. After that parade, it was held every 5 years. The last victory parade in the Socialist Federal Republic of Yugoslavia was held on the ruby jubilee in 1985 (branded as Parade 85). On 10 May 2019, the first Victory Day Parade of the Serbian Armed Forces in close to 35 years was held in the city of Niš (branded as "The Defence of Freedom").

Tajikistan

Victory Day parades of the 201st Motor Rifle Division in the Tajik SSR were held on Dousti Square in the capital of Dushanbe in 1965 and 1985. Parades are also held annually in Victory Park.

Turkmenistan

In 2020, the 75th anniversary of the victory in the war was celebrated with a military parade and festive celebrations. This was the first ever Victory Parade to be held since Turkmen independence was attained. Soldiers of the Armed Forces of Turkmenistan took part in the parade, which was held at a square in front of the Halk Hakydasy Memorial Complex in the capital of Ashgabat, with a special appearance by Russian Deputy Minister of Defence Alexander Fomin. The parade featured a procession of various historical artifacts, including the banner of the 748th Infantry Regiment of the 206th Rifle Division of the 2nd Ukrainian Front (which was brought into the capital from Moscow) as well as the GAZ-M20 Pobeda parade car and battle vehicles from that era. The parade was held in spite of the coronavirus pandemic in the country and was one of two parades being held that year in the former Soviet Union, with the other being in Minsk.

Ukraine

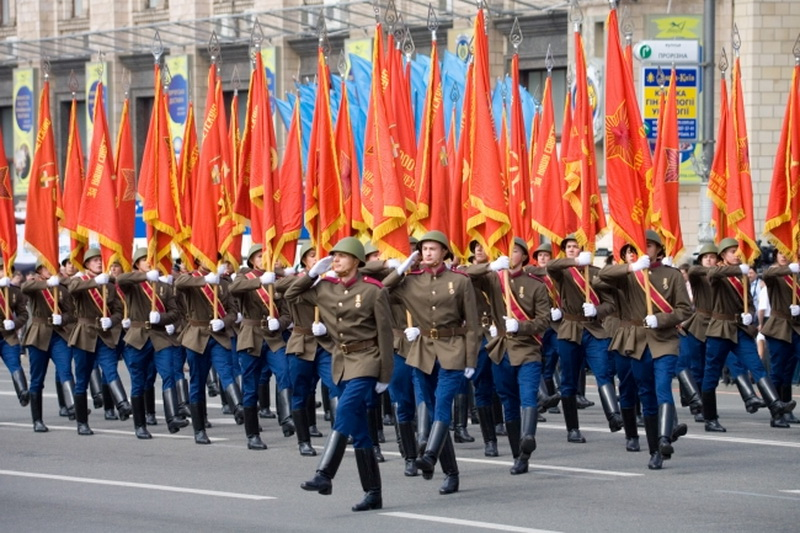
Victory Day Parade in Kyiv in 2010

Ukraine, as the second-largest former Soviet republic in terms of population, used to have some of the largest and most frequent victory parades. The first official proposal to celebrate Victory Day with a parade appeared at a meeting of the Central Committee of the Communist Party of Ukraine on 27 March 1945. The first military parade since the liberation of Kyiv was held on International Workers' Day (1 May), being dubbed in the local media as a "Victory Parade". The parade took place on Korolenko Street (now Vladimirska). During the latter half of the Ukrainian SSR's existence, parades were held in 1965 and 1990, with the planned 1985 parade being cancelled.

After independence in 1991, the first parade was held in 1995 to celebrate the golden jubilee of the Victory in Europe, and was held again in 2001, 2010, and 2011 until the last formal parade took place in 2013. All of these were held along the area of Maidan Nezalezhnosti with the mobile column stationed on Khreshchatyk Street. Parades have also been held on a regular basis in the cities of Odesa, Kharkiv, and Lviv, usually taking the form of a small march past nowadays rather than a full ceremony. From 2010 to 2013 Kharkiv's Freedom Square hosted an annual parade with the participation of the troops of the Kharkov Garrison, military academies located in Kharkiv and troops from Russia.

The planned parade was cancelled for the first time in 2014 by order of the Kyiv City State Administration in light of the start Russo-Ukrainian War and the holiday's Russian connotations.

In 2023 9 May as a public holiday was canceled and henceforth the end of the Second World War in Ukraine is celebrated on the Day of Remembrance and Victory over Nazism in World War II 1939 – 1945 on 8 May.

(For many now in Ukraine, May 9, since 2023 marked as Europe Day, is also the commemorative date of the first ever Ukrainian military parade in modern history, a historic joint Polish Armed Forces and Ukrainian People's Army parade held to mark the 1920 liberation of the capital during the Polish-Soviet War and the Ukrainian War of Independence, the only parade of the Ukrainian People's Republic during its short history.) Only in the separatist-controlled parts of Donetsk and Luhansk oblasts of the country, since 2015, do the people completely celebrate the traditional Victory Day parades with military vehicles and servicemen and women marching past the main squares of the two cities.

Uzbekistan

In 2018, a Victory Parade of the Tashkent Military District was held on its training ground in Chirchik on the occasion of Day of Remembrance and Honour. Parades have also been held in Samarkand.

=== Parades held in partly recognized states ===
Republic of Abkhazia

Victory parades have been held in Abkhazia annually since 2009. This should not be confused with the Victory parade on 30 September in Sukhumi on Independence Day.

Republic of South Ossetia

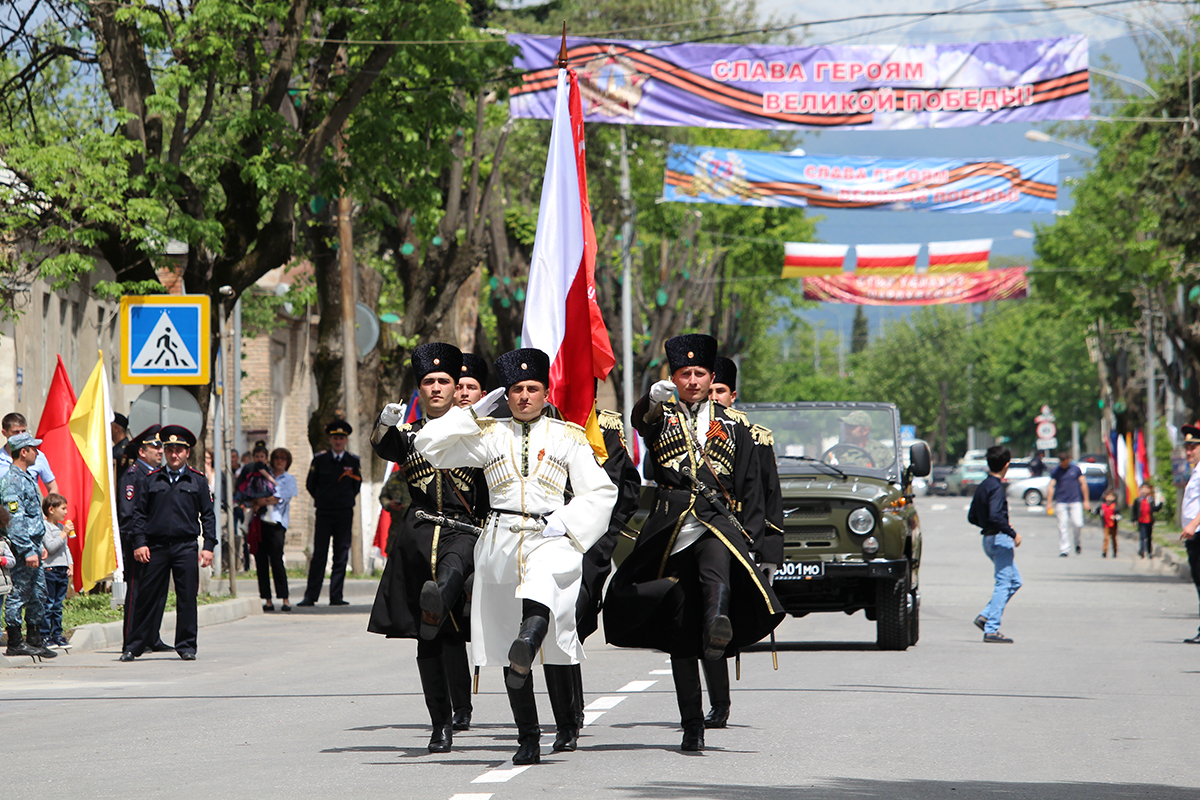
Victory Day in Tshkinvali 2018.

Like its neighbor Abkhazia, South Ossetia has held annual Victory Day Parades in the capital of Tskhinvali since 2009. All victory parades take place on Theatre Square and involve troops of the Armed Forces of South Ossetia.

In 2020, for the first time, the parade was held on 24 June in line with the Moscow parade, with President Anatoly Bibilov not being attendance due to commitments in Russia, with the parade being presided instead by Prime Minister Erik Pukhayev. During the parade, an equestrian team from the Border Administration of the Russian Federal Security Service took part in the parade for the first time in history, with the equestrian ranks being led by an officer on a stallion called Brilliant, a direct descendant of Idol (one of two stallions used in the Moscow Victory Parade of 1945), according to the local authorities. The parade also saw the introduction of female soldiers.

Artsakh Republic

The Victory Day (and Shushi Liberation Day) Parade is held on Renaissance Square in Stepanakert. It is only held on the jubilee anniversaries of the capture of Shusha and the Siege of Stepanakert, both of which ended on Victory Day in 1992. The first parade in honor of the holiday was held in 1995 to celebrate the 3rd anniversary since liberation and the golden jubilee (50th anniversary) of the end of the Second World War. Subsequent parades were held in 1997, 2007, 2012 and 2017.

Donetsk People's Republic

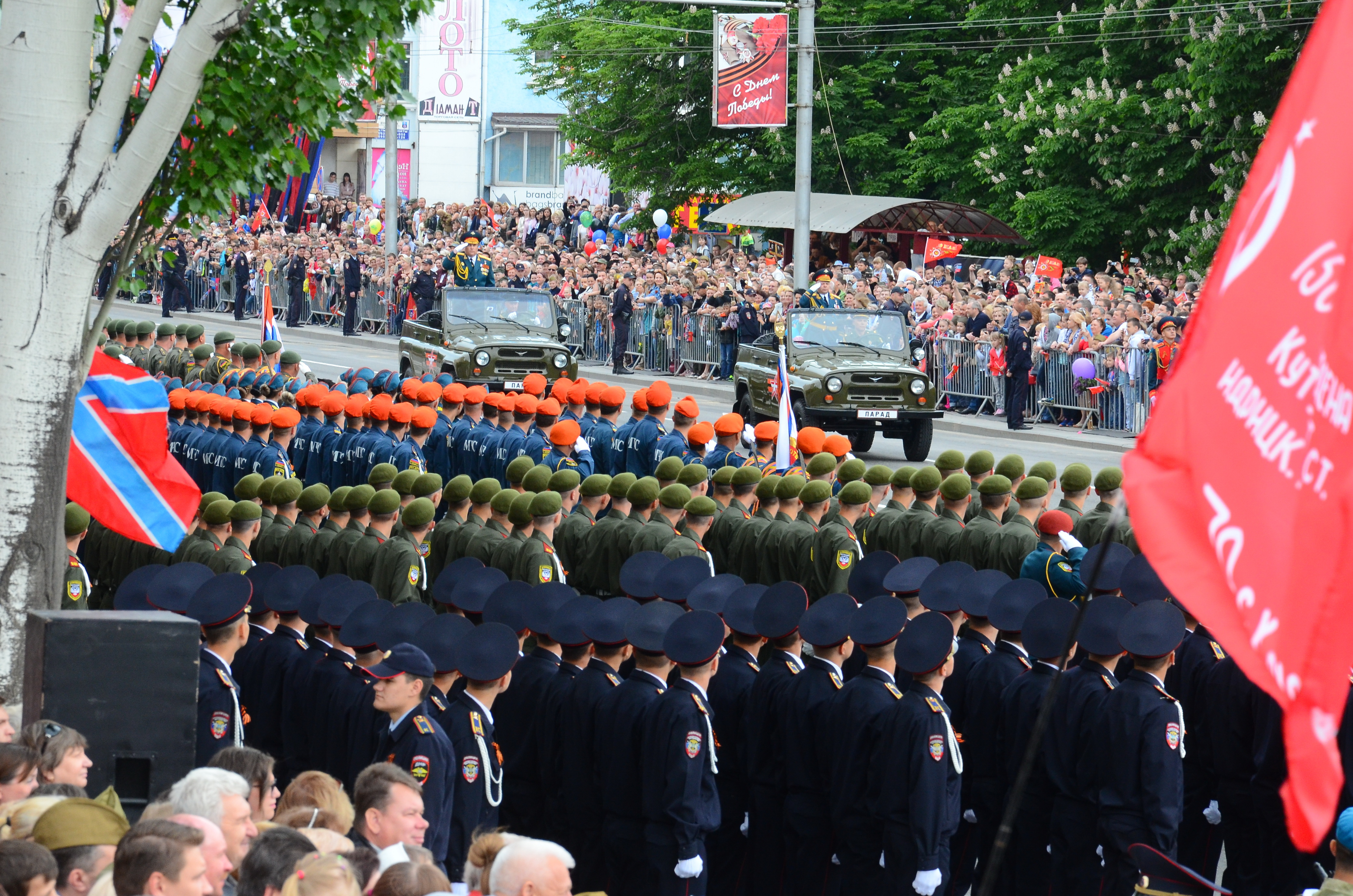
Victory Day in Donetsk 2018.

To symbolize its Russian heritage, the authorities in the breakaway Donetsk People's Republic held its first parade in 2015. The inaugural parade was held at Artem Street on Lenin Square and was criticized by the Organization for Security and Co-operation in Europe for violating the Minsk Protocol. It includes troops from the United Armed Forces of Novorossiya.

Luhansk People's Republic

The Luhansk People's Republic has conducted parades in honor of Victory Day since 2015.

=== Parades held in unrecognized states ===
Pridnestrovian Moldavian Republic

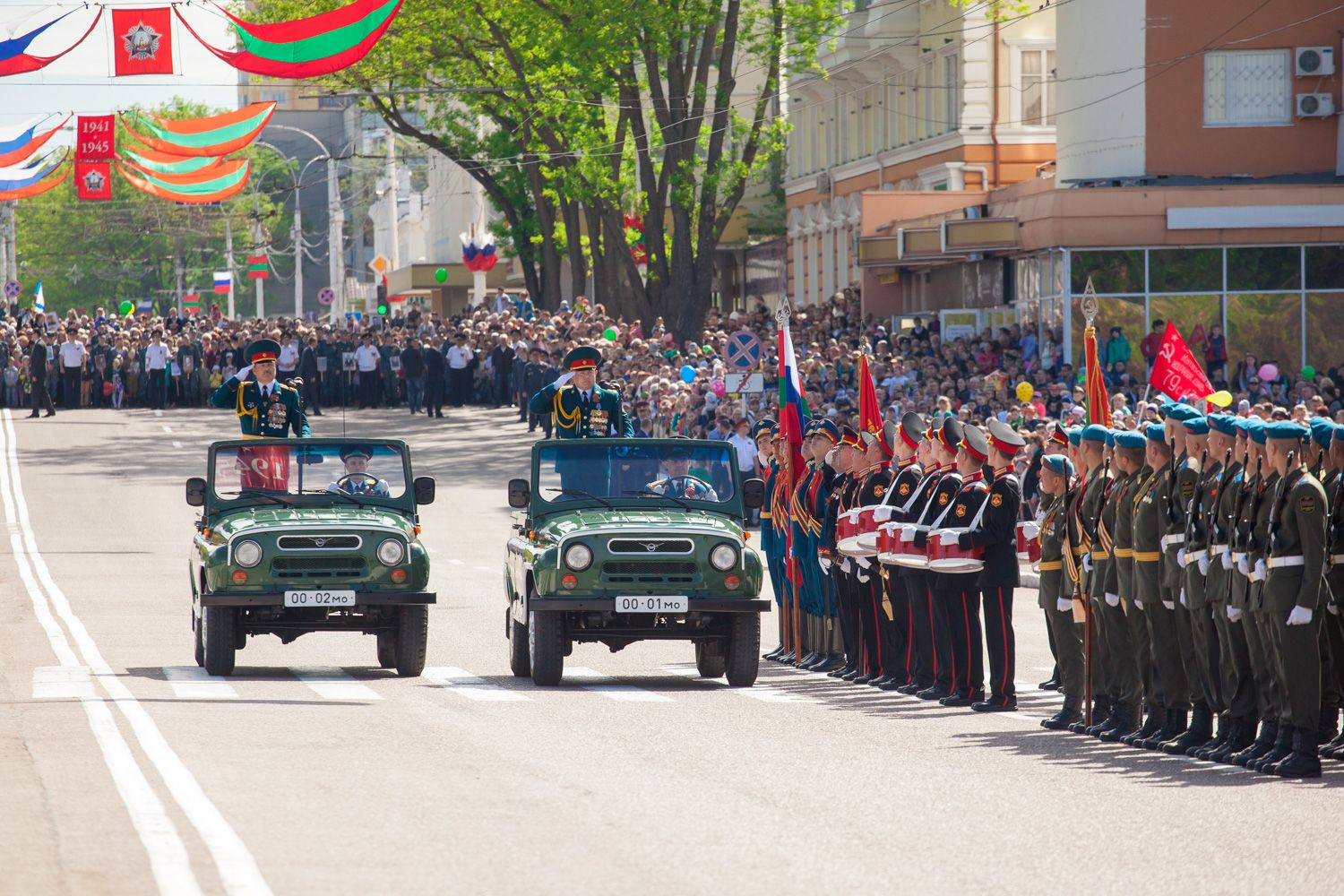
A Victory Day parade in Tiraspol, 2017.

Victory Day parades in the Pridnestrovian Moldavian Republic are held on Suvorov Square in Tiraspol. It is the first of two parades to be held every year, being held by the Armed Forces of Transnistria in conjunction with the Operational Group of Russian Forces. In addition to parades on jubilee years (2005, 2010 and 2015), it is also held annually. The parade was cancelled for the first time in 2020 and rescheduled to Republic Day on 2 September, marking the celebrations of the republic's pearl jubilee year.

== Expanded summary of the parades within current and former countries ==
=== Victors Avenue, Minsk ===
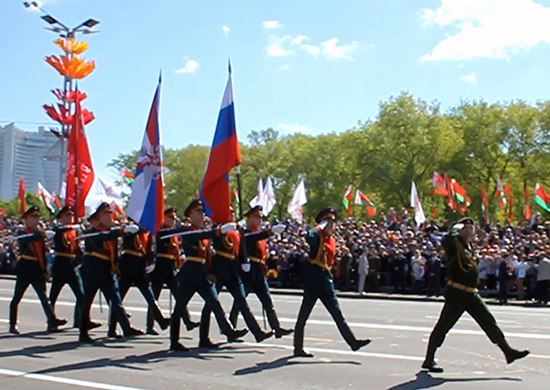
Russian troops marching in the 2015 Minsk parade as guest contingents.

The parade commander (the Deputy Defense Minister bearing the rank of Major General) arrives on Victors Avenue to receive the report from the commander of the first parade formation (usually the Military Academy of Belarus). The President of Belarus then arrives at the grandstand in front of the Minsk Hero City Obelisk to await the start of the parade. The parade commander gives the order to begin the review of the Minsk Garrison by the Defence Minister of Belarus, the parade presenting arms at that juncture and the massed bands of the Minsk Garrison under the Military Band Service of the Armed Forces of the Republic of Belarus beginning to play inspection music under the baton of the Senior Director of Music.

The Defense Minister, having now been duly notified, then reviews the parading troops along the avenue in his vehicle, stopping a few times to send holiday greetings to a 4,000 strong ground column formation from the armed forces and other uniformed organizations while the massed bands play inspection music. As the defense minister concludes the inspection of the troops, he reports to the president on the readiness of the parade. A minute of silence then takes place, followed by a performance of the National Anthem of Belarus (My Belarusy) by the massed bands. The president then delivers an address to the nation and congratulates the citizens on the holiday. As the president concludes the address, following a fanfare by the bands the parade commander then gives the order for the Minsk Garrison to get into their parade formations, and for the troops of the Honour Guard Company to take their post as linemen to mark the distance of the troops marching past the grandstand. The first unit to march, beating the snare drums, are the drummers of the Minsk Suvorov Military School, followed by cadets of special military high schools of the armed forces and public security organizations, and a colour guard consisting of the flag party (Flag of Belarus, Flag of the USSR, and Banner of Victory) the standards of the fronts which were involved in the 1944 Minsk Offensive, followed by historical companies, honoring both the regular Red Army and the Soviet Air Force that liberated the republic and the partisan movement that grew during the Nazi occupation. They consists of cadets of the Military Academy of Belarus dressed in military uniforms of the historical period of the war and equipped Mosin rifles. This is followed by the rest of the parade ground column in the following arrangement as they march past the presidential grandstand:

- Military Academy of Belarus
- Belarusian National Technical University
- 120th Guards Separate Mechanized Brigade
- 38th Guards Air Assault Brigade
- 5th Special Operations Brigade
- Battalion of women servicemen of the Armed Forces
- Cadets of the Internal Troops College of the Military Academy of Belarus
- Interior Ministry Troops
- Special Purpose Police of Belarus
- Company of women policemen of the Belarusian Police
- State Border Committee Training Institute
- Emergencies Ministry National University of Civil Defense
- Territorial Defense of the Armed Forces
- Honor Guard of the Armed Forces of Belarus

The mobile column then follows, led up by a historical segment composed of military vehicles and equipment used during the days of the 1944 Minsk Offensive, followed on by the usual flypast by the Belarusian Air Force opened by a Mi-8 helicopter.

=== Khreshchatyk Street, Kyiv ===
In the years wherein the Victory Day over Nazism in World War II (from 2015 until 2023) parade was held in the Ukrainian capital of Kyiv, the parade commander - a lieutenant general holding the appointment of Commanding General, Operational Command North or general holding the billet of Commander of the Ground Forces, following the report of the commandant, Ivan Chernyakhovsky National Defense University of Ukraine (usually a major general), inspects the formations assembled on Khreshchatyk Street, first the Kyiv Presidential Honor Guard Battalion (Presidential Brigade), the parade tri-service colour guard and then the remainder of the parade's ground and mobile columns.

At 10am, following the playing of a recording of clock chimes, and as the massed bands of the Military Music Department of the General Staff of the Ukrainian Armed Forces stationed at Independence Square played a fanfare, the President, who serves as supreme commander in chief of the Armed Forces of Ukraine, arrives. He meets with members of the National Security and Defense Council, the Supreme Commander in Chief's Staff, representatives of the Armed Forces General Staff and the Ministries of Defense and Internal Affairs, the Chairman of the Verkhovna Rada and its vice chairmen, the secretary general, sergeant at arms, faction leaders and floor leaders, and the living veterans of the war who are assembled on the grandstand near the Independence Monument. Also gathered there is the diplomatic corps, military attaches, family members of war victims and representatives of veterans organizations, government agencies, state-owned companies and the private sector.

The arrival is followed by the march in of No.1 Guard of Honor Company of the Presidential Honor Guard Battalion, which serves as the parade colour company carrying the Flag of Ukraine and the Victory Banner. As the parade presented arms, the battalion marches past the authorities and takes its place of honor in the flag pole near the Independence Monument for the flag raising ceremony after the company's color section takes post there, in which the National anthem of Ukraine is played either acapella or by the bands with choral accompaniment as a 21-gun salute is fired.

At the end of the flag raising, the parade orders arms and a moment of silence is observed in honor of all the victims of the Second World War in Ukraine and the Ukrainian heroes of that conflict.

Following this the parade presents arms to receive the parade reviewing officer, either the Minister of Defense or Commander in Chief of the Armed Forces (if the former is military, usually holding general or general of the army rank). The parade commander's vehicle drives near the bands and once the reviewing officer arrives and the bands stop playing, he informs him of the readiness of the parade to be inspected. The report is received, both then drive past the formations assembled around Khreshchatyk Street as the massed bands play slow marches, stopping to greet each of the parade battalions assembled. The tri-service colour guard, a second guard of honor company and a battalion of servicemen both under the Presidential Brigade is inspected first, then the historical battalions, followed by battalions of cadets and active servicemen and women and then the mobile column. After all have inspected, the parade commander returns to his place and the parade reviewing officer arrives at the Maidan to inform the president of the parade's readiness to march off.

=== Victory Park, Dushanbe ===
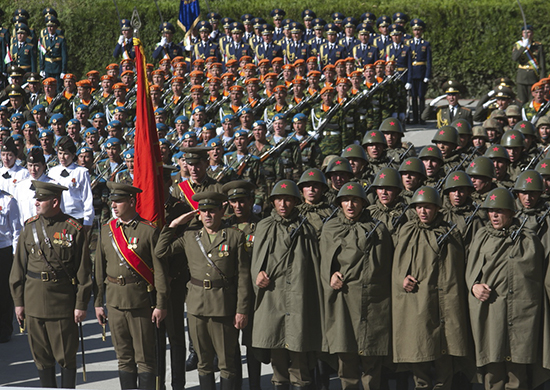
The parade in 2017

According to tradition, a wreath-laying ceremony at the tomb of the unknown soldier takes place at Victory Park.

Full order of the parade:

- Military Brass Band of the Commandant Regiment of the Ministry of Defense of Tajikistan
- Presidential National Guard
- Units of the Commandant Regiment of the Ministry of Defense
- Military Institute of the Ministry of Defense of Tajikistan
- Mastibek Tashmukhamedov Military Lyceum of the Ministry of Defense of Tajikistan
- Russian 201st Military Base
- Honor Guard Company of the Ministry of Defense of Tajikistan

=== Letná Plain, Prague ===
It was on the large expanse of Prague's Letná Plain (Letenská pláň), a large employ field that every 5 years on 9 May from 1951 to 1985 (formerly yearly until the 1960s) witnessed parades of the Czechoslovak People's Army in the federal capital of Czechoslovakia following a mix of the Soviet style and its own traditions in its grounds, celebrating both the victory in Europe and the conclusion of the successful Prague Uprising. A televised event since the 1950s, the President of Czechoslovakia, in his capacity as General Secretary of the Communist Party of Czechoslovakia (unless held by a separate person) and Supreme Commander in Chief of the People's Army, was the chief guest of honor of the parade. On the morning of the day, an estimated 9,000 military personnel, assembled by battalions on the square together with the Prague Garrison Massed Bands of around 400-800 bandsmen under the direction of the Senior Director of Music (formerly stationed in different parts of the grounds in the 1950s) were present, with the stands in Milada Horaková street filled up with together with veterans, veterans' families and the general public. At the main grandstand attached to Letná Stadium were members of the Party Central Committee, the Cabinet, the Federal Assembly leadership and the chairmen of its two chambers, senior officers of the Ministry of National Defence and the General Staff, representatives of Soviet Armed Forces formations based in the republic and the diplomatic corps.

The celebrations began at 10 am with the playing of the Presidential Fanfare, based on the Overture of the opera Libuše, signalling the arrival of the president and if present, the Party General Secretary, with the Minister of National Defence, a billet of a General of the Army, informing the President of the presence of the parade. Later on, with the massed bands playing the Uvitaci Pochod by Václav Dobiáš, the parade commander, a general officer with either Lieutenant General or Colonel General rank, with the parade now in the present arms position as ordered, after the bands stop playing, informed the Minister of National Defence on his parade car after that the parade has now been formed up for inspection. Following the report, the parade inspector then reviewed the mobile column first and then the assembled formations, including representatives of the People's Militias and the formations of the Ministry of the Interior, including the Border Guard and the National Security Corps, stopping at each unit to greet the assembled formations on the holiday.

Following the keynote address a 21-gun salute resounded over the grounds as the massed bands played both Kde domov můj and State Anthem of the Soviet Union as the entire grandstand stood up in respect of the anthems, with all military and police personnel there saluting and the whole parade presented arms.

=== Kazakh Eli Square, Astana ===
The traditional Victory Parade in the capital is held with the march on of the Flag of Kazakhstan and the Banner of Victory, before the President of Kazakhstan receives the report from the Defence Minister of Kazakhstan on the readiness of the parade. The minister and the president will then inspect the forces on parade, who will yell in a traditional greeting to their Supreme Commander-in-Chief. Once both officials arrive at the tribute, the present formally greets the troops before delivering a holiday address. Upon concluding the speech, the massed bands perform Meniŋ Qazaqstanym before the parade commander (the Commander-in-Chief of the Ground Forces) sounds the orders to begin the parade. The parade is traditionally led by cadets of the Astana Zhas Ulan Republican School. They are then followed by contingents from the three services of the Armed Forces of Kazakhstan (Ground Forces, Air Defense Forces and the Naval Forces), the State Security Service, the National Guard, and the Territorial Troops, among other ground and air equipment.

== See also ==
- Minuta Molchanya
- Pobediteli
- Time of Remembrance and Reconciliation for Those Who Lost Their Lives during the Second World War
- Immortal Regiment
- Culture of the Russian Armed Forces
