= 1905 Square (Yekaterinburg) =

Square in the center of Yekaterinburg, Russia

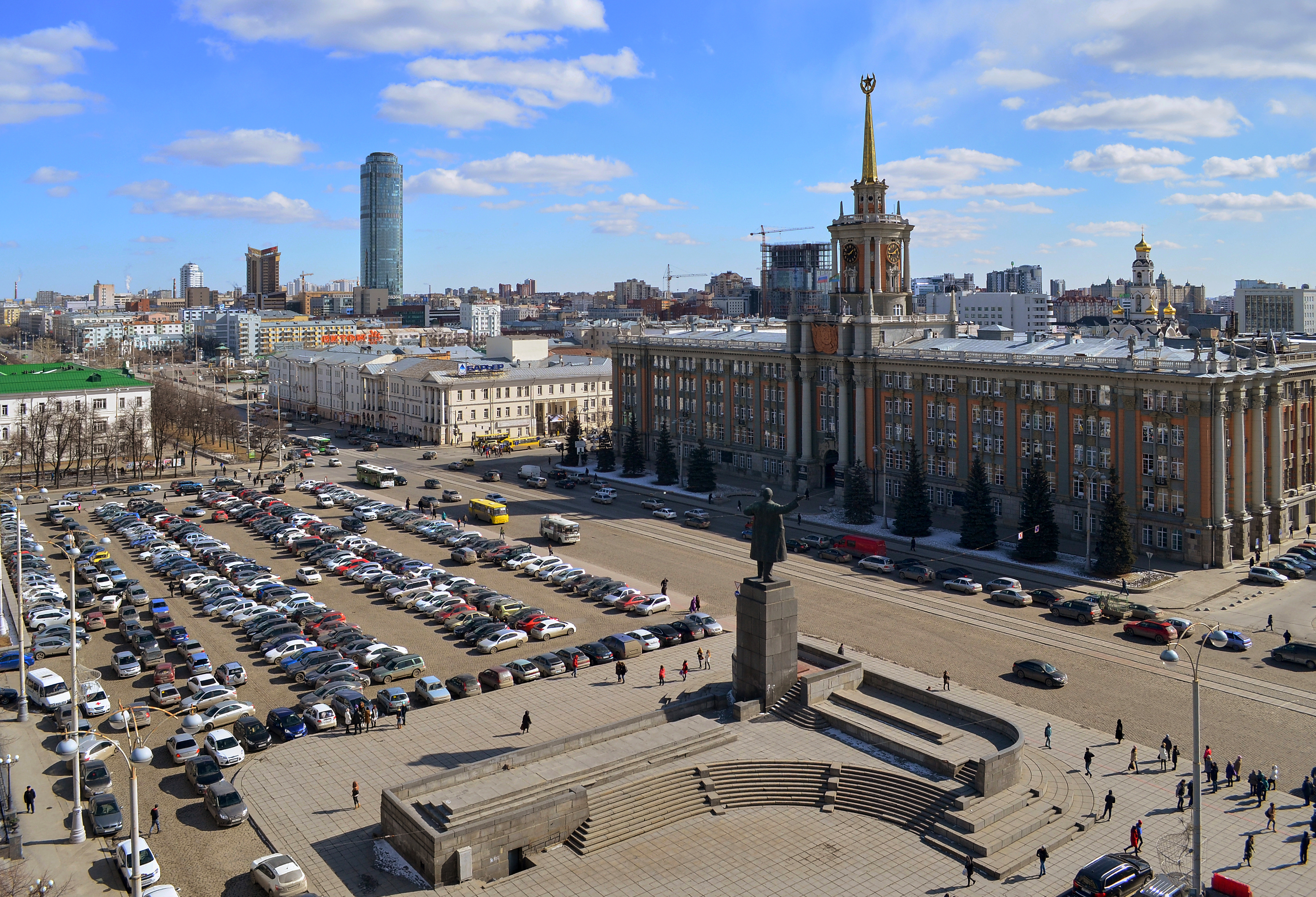
- Interactive map of 1905 Square
- Native name: Площадь 1905 года (Russian)
- Former name: Cathedral Square
- Type: Square
- Location: Yekaterinburg, Russia

Other
- Known for: The square is named after the 1905 Russian Revolution.

1905 Square (Russian: Площадь 1905 годa), also translated as the Square of 1905, is a square in Yekaterinburg, Russia. It is the oldest square in Yekaterinburg.

== History ==
=== Imperial era ===
The area arose in the early years of the construction of Yekaterinburg and soon became the central place of trade. In 1745-1747 a wooden Epiphany church was built on the square. In 1771-1774, next to the church on the square, a two-story stone Epiphany Cathedral was built. The square became the center of revolutionary events of the early 20th century. On 1 May 1905, the first political demonstration and rally took place on the square. On 19 October 1905, students and gymnasium students entered the square to discuss the "Highest Manifesto for the Improvement of Public Order", published by Emperor Nicholas II.

=== 1917-1919 ===
On 26 October 1917, the Bolsheviks declared victory in the October Revolution from the area here. A few days later, the Bolsheviks changed the name of the Cathedral Square to 1905 Square, renaming the square after the 1905 Russian Revolution. During the Russian Civil War, the first Red Army detachments went to the front from the square. In 1918, the Red Guards who died in battle with the chieftain Dutov were buried in the square. On 14 July 1919, the first parade of the Red Army took place on the square after the city's liberation from the Czechoslovak Legion.

=== Since 1920 ===
In 1928, a 5-storey residential building was built on the north side. In 1930, the historic pre-revolutionary Epiphany Cathedral was demolished by decision of the City Council. In 1929-30, two lines were laid at the Yekaterinburg tram near the square. In 1967, a side extension was made to the building of the Conservatory, where the concert hall of the Conservatory was located. Since December 1991, the Administration of the City of Yekaterinburg has been located on The square. In 1994, the Yekaterinburg metro station was opened. In 2008, during the replacement of old paving stones, numerous burials were discovered. It is assumed that, basically, they belong to the clergymen buried at the Cathedral. A few days later, prayers were held at this place by the ministers Temple of Innocent of Moscow. On 8 March 2012, the reconstruction of the historic pre-revolutionary Passage building began, which actually turned into a demolition of the building and cutting down the Square at the Passage, which caused heated discussions and protests of the citizens.

== Events on the square ==
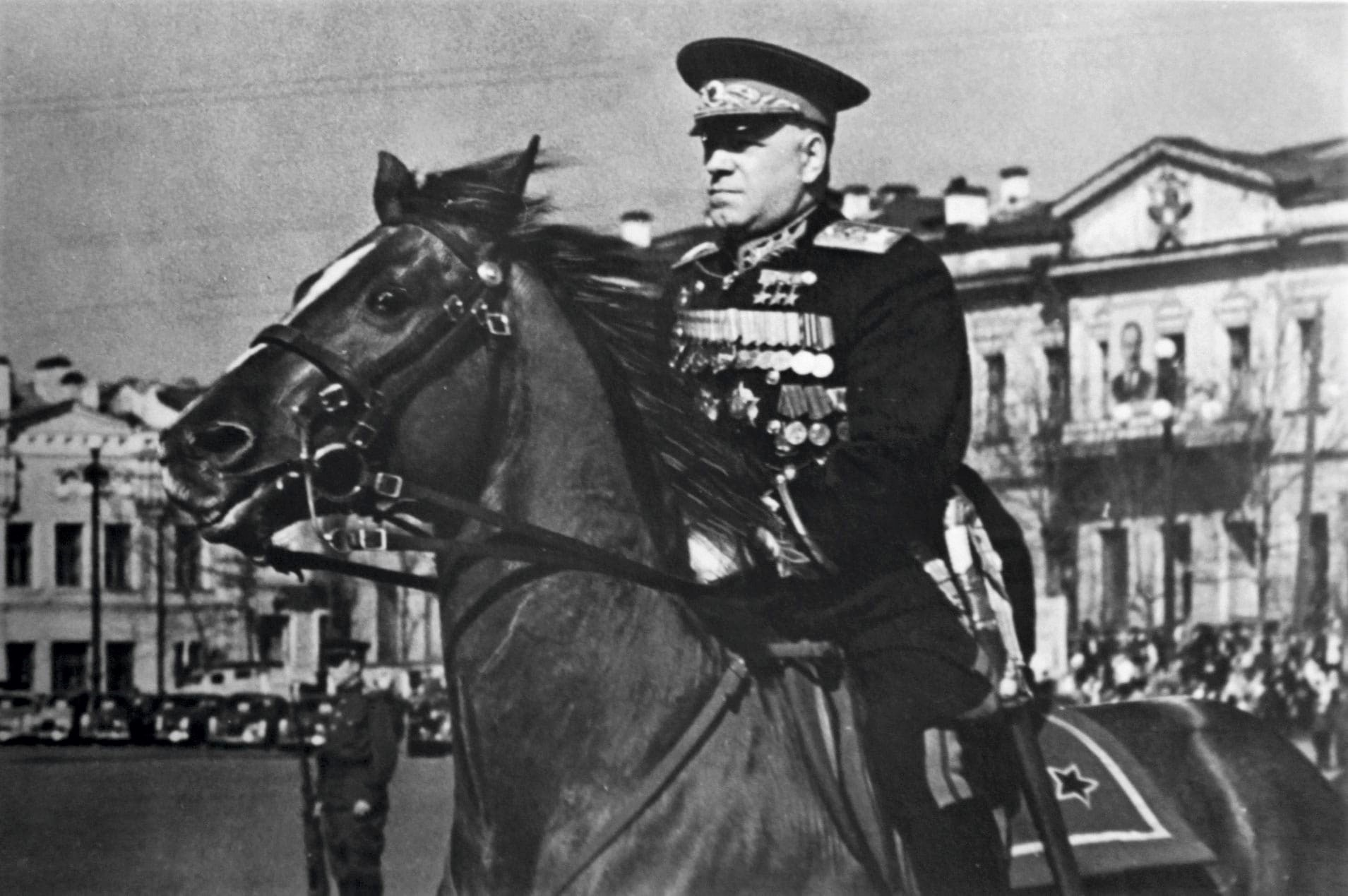
Marshal Georgy Zhukov at a post-war 1 May parade in Sverdlovsk, between 1948-1950.

Since 1947, New Year's Eve celebrations have taken place on the square. Before 1991, military parades of the Yekaterinburg Garrison and demonstrations of workers in honour of May 1, Revolution Day, and Victory Day took place there. After 1991, the number of parades was reduced to one, in honor of Victory Day in WWII. An example of this was the first of many Victory Day Parades to be held in 1975. On 29 December 1989, a protest took place on the square in front of the City Council building, protesting the actions of the National Communist Party of the Soviet Union.

== Notoriety ==
The modern square was originally two separate areas divided by the Epiphany Cathedral: Cathedral Square to the west and Trade Square to the east. Following the cathedral’s demolition in 1930, these spaces merged into the unified 1905 Square. The cathedral featured a 66.2-meter bell tower, which was once the tallest structure in the city until it was surpassed in 1876 by the Great Zlatoust (77.2 meters) located a block away. Today, a historical necropolis of the church remains partially preserved beneath the pavement, and the square is dominated by the City Administration building — a 1950s reconstruction of the former Gostiny Dvor (merchant yard) — and a prominent statue of Vladimir Lenin erected in 1957.

== Gallery ==
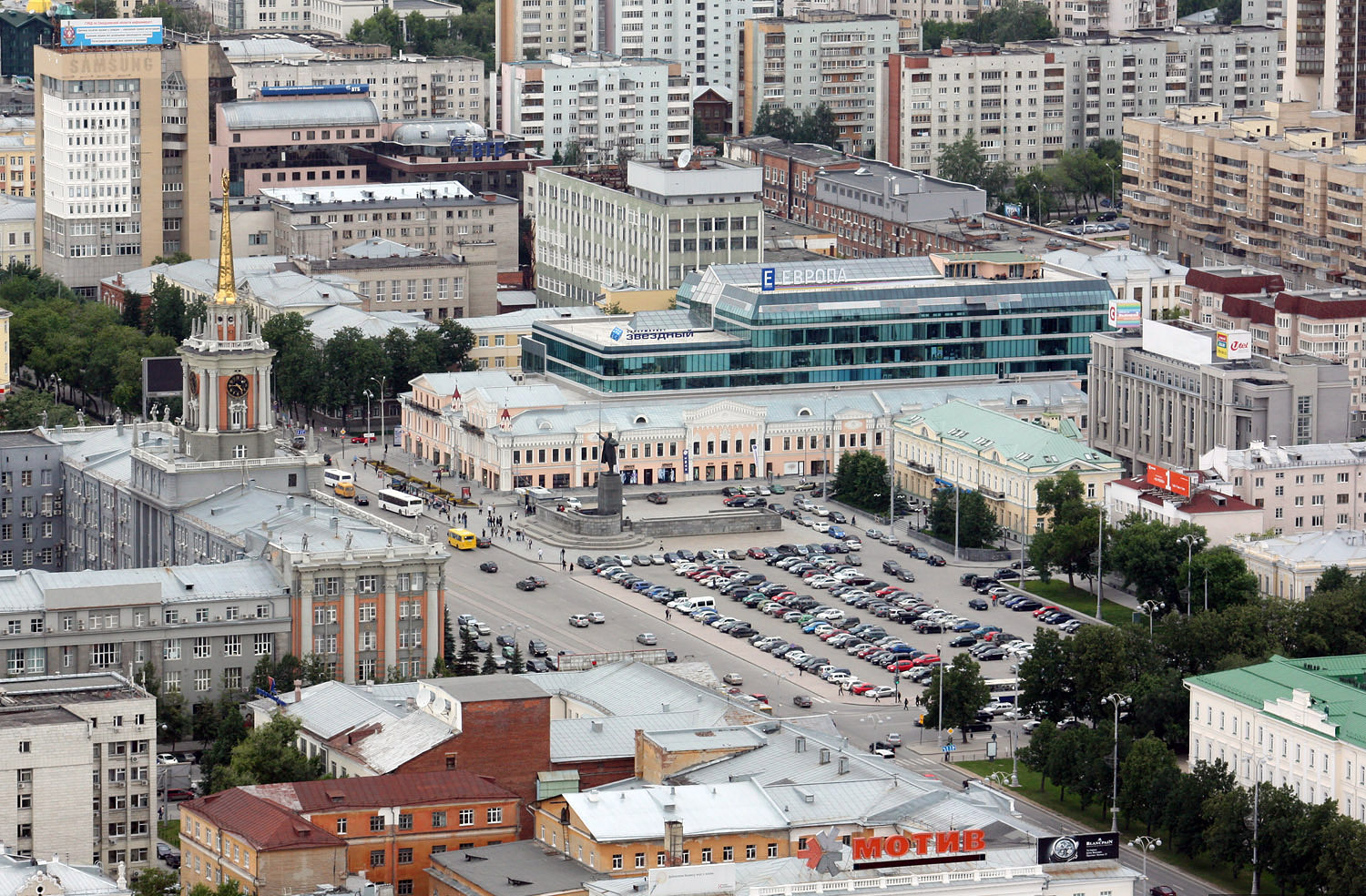

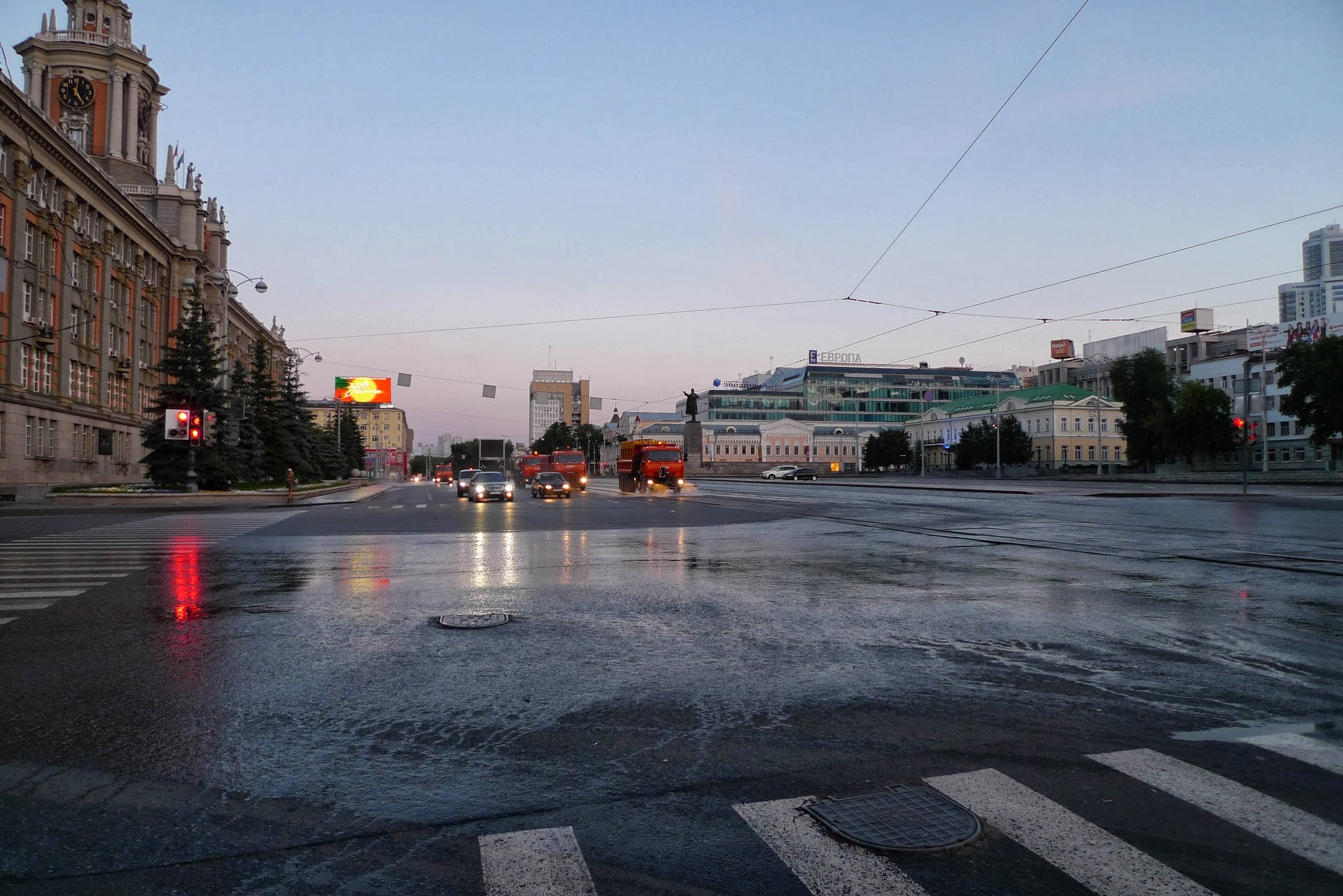

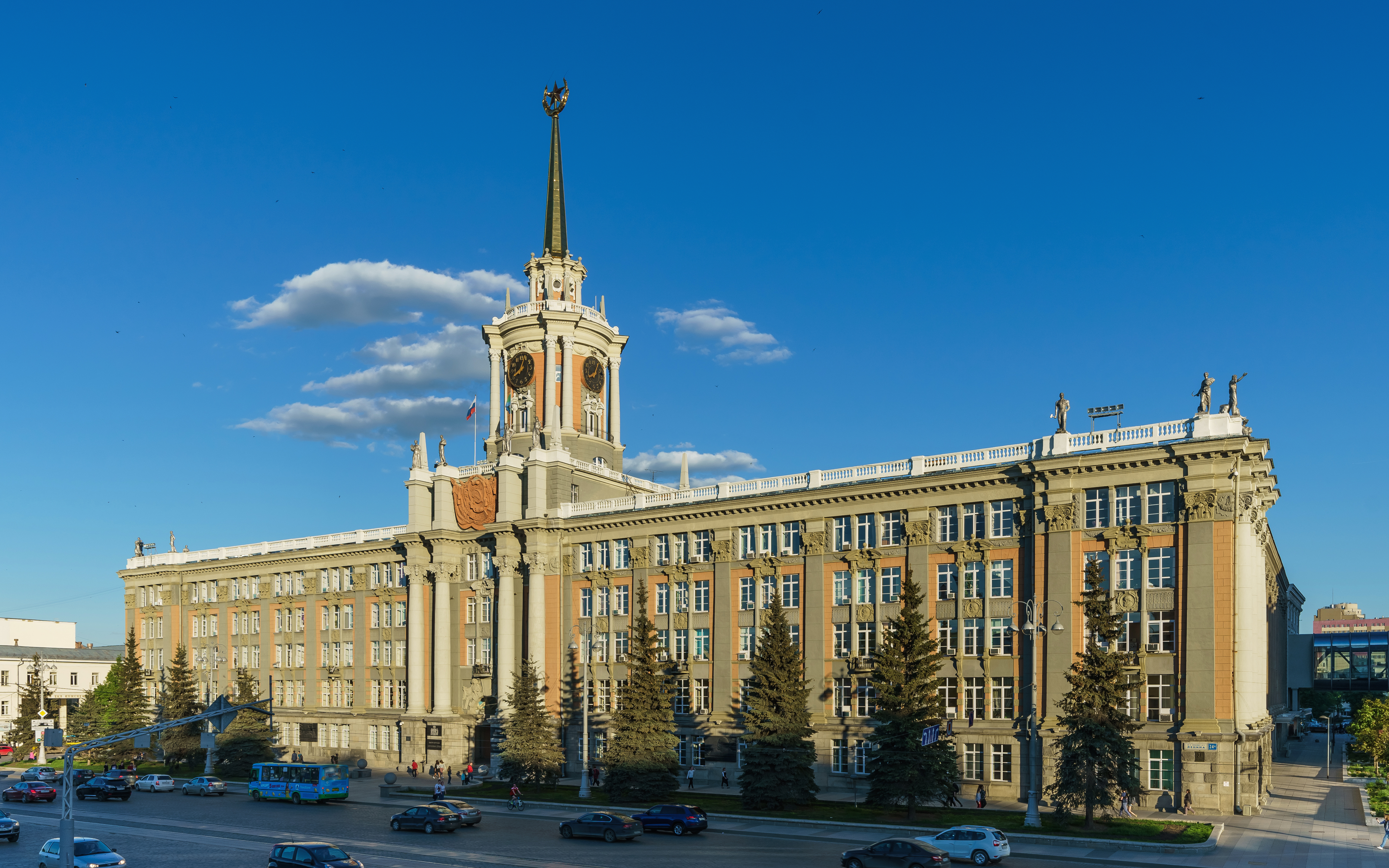
The building of the city duma.

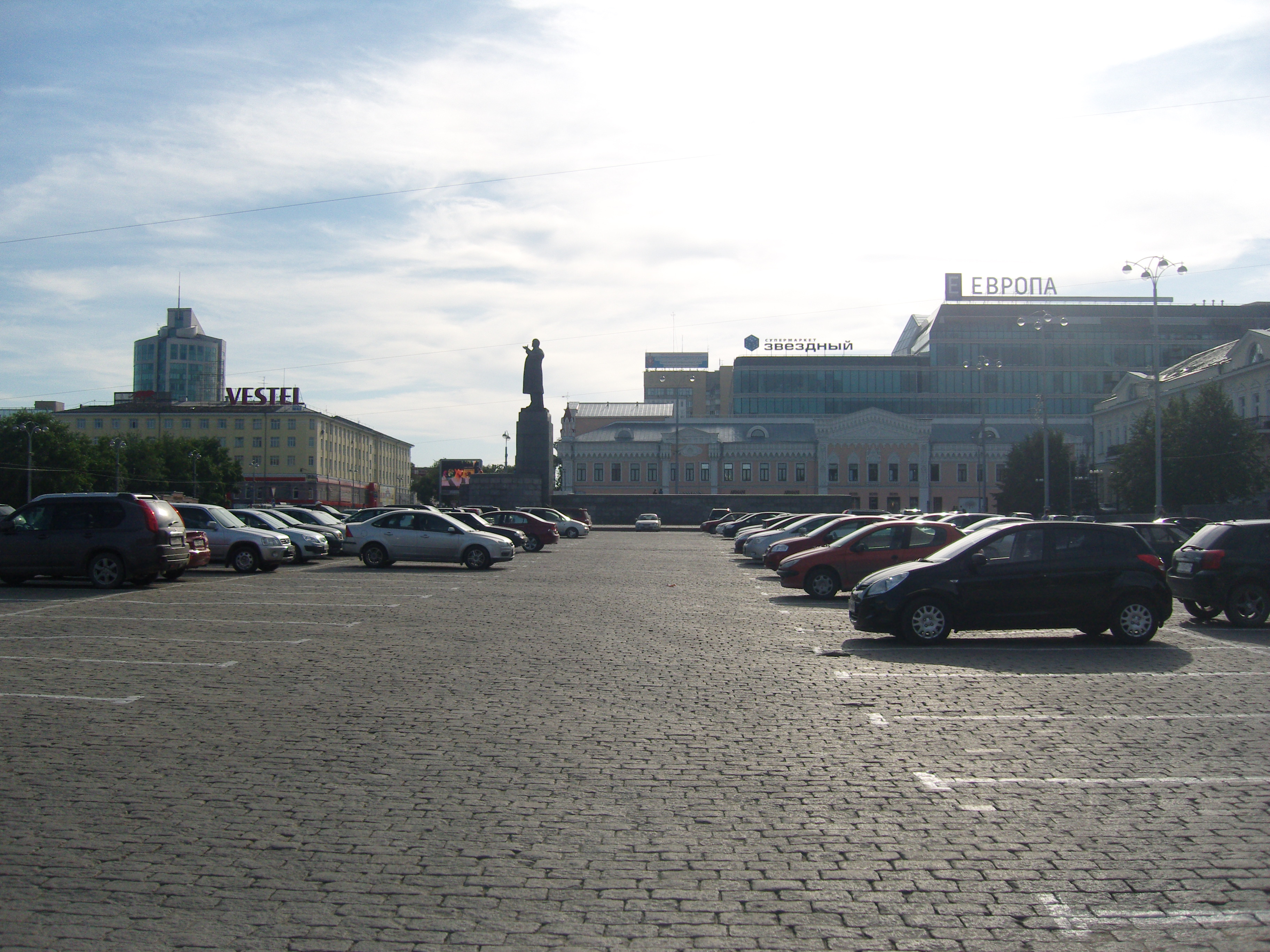

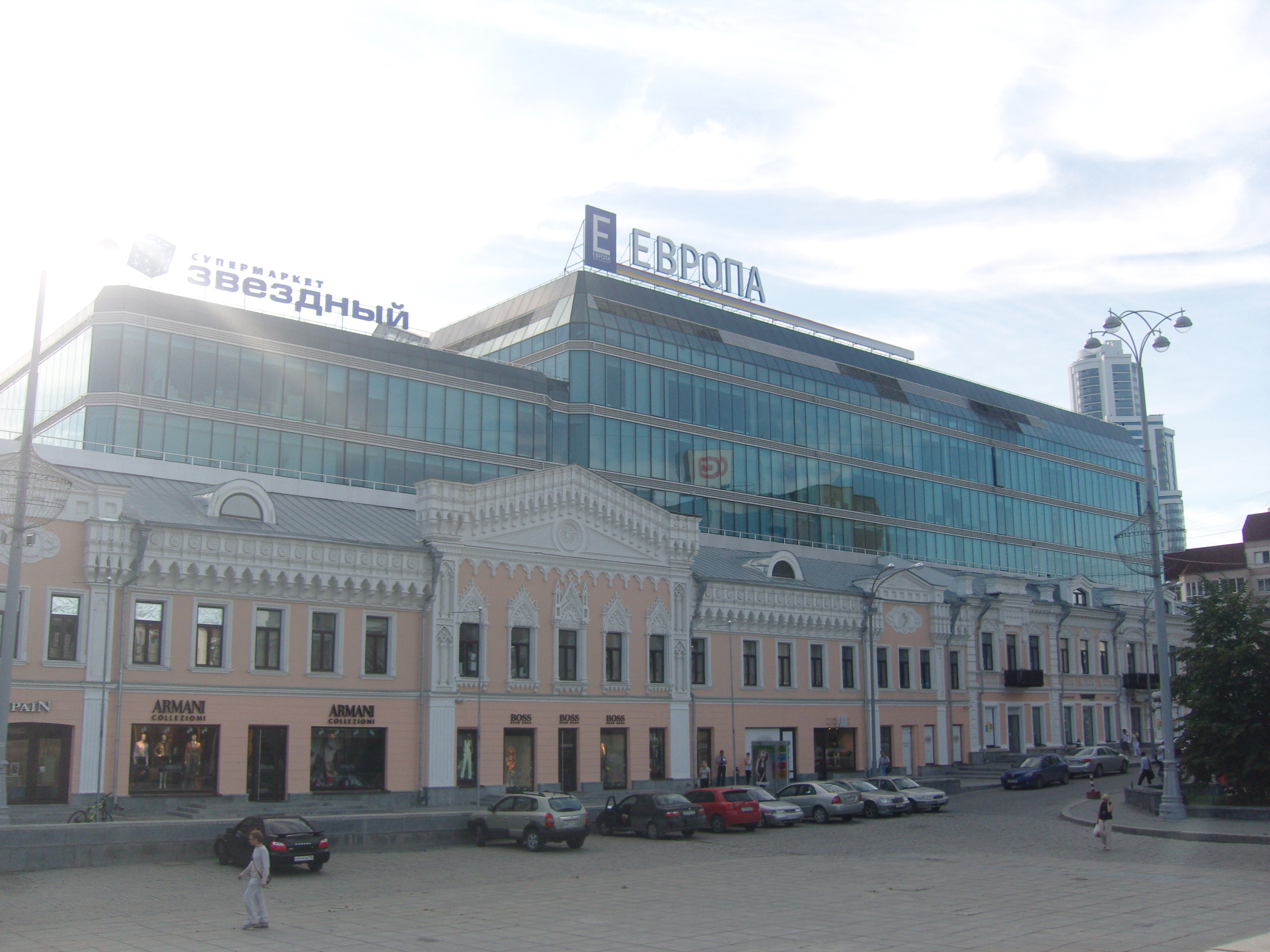

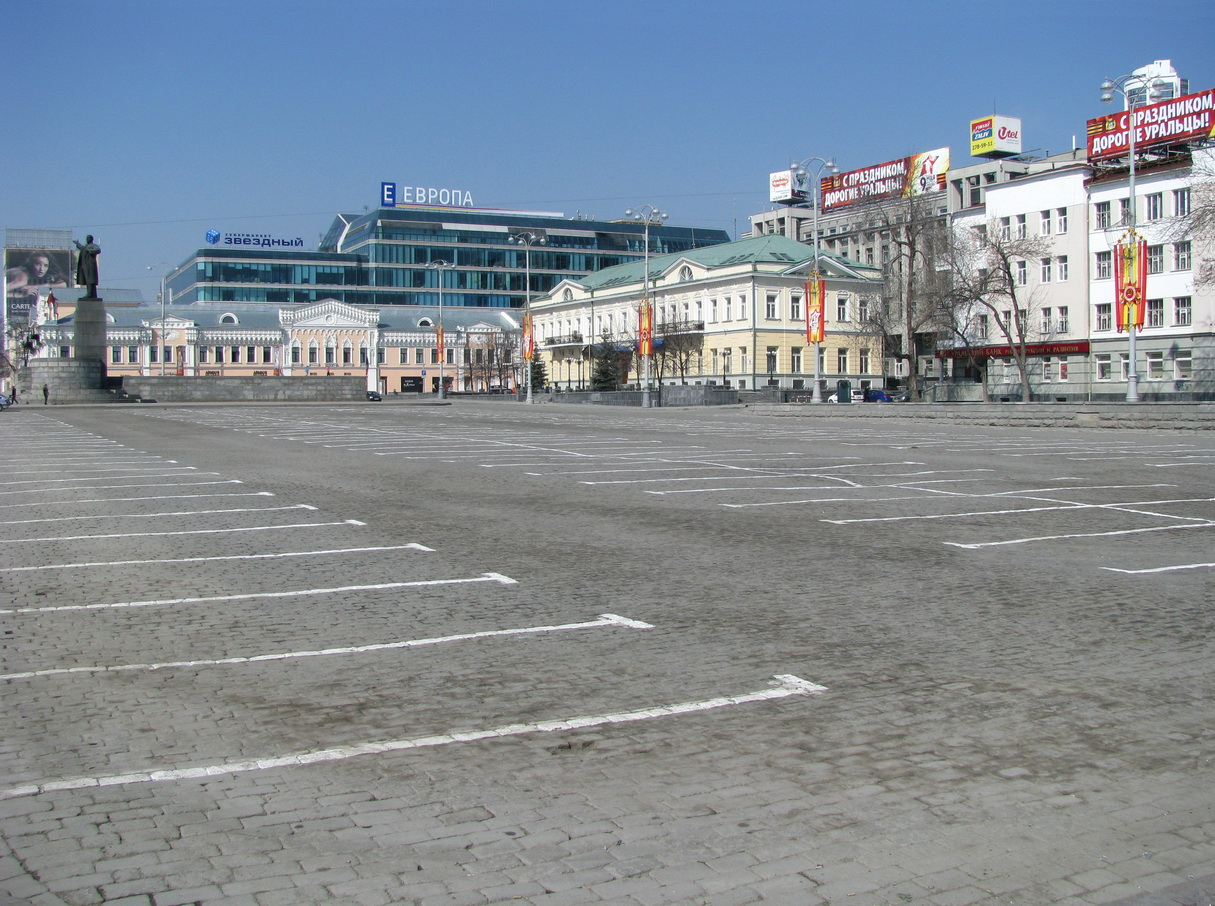
