= 1985 Warsaw Victory Day Parade =

The 1985 Warsaw Victory Day Parade was a military parade (Defilada Zwycięstwa) held in Warsaw, the capital of the Polish People's Republic. It was held to commemorate the ruby jubilee (40th anniversary) of the end of the Second World War. The parade featured officers and soldiers of the Polish People's Army who marched in front of the Palace of Culture and Science on Parade Square. 3,000 troops took part in the parade, which had musical accompaniment by the Representative Central Band of the LWP. The units on parade included guards of honour including the Representative Honor Guard of the LWP and the Academy of Officers of Anti-Aircraft Defense Forces at Koszalin. The parade was commanded by Divisional General Jerzy Skalski of the Warsaw Military District, who reported to General Florian Siwicki, Minister of National Defence and presiding officer for the parade.

Among the distinguished Polish attendees were First Secretary of the PKLN and Prime Minister Wojciech Jaruzelski as well as Henryk Jabłoński, the de facto head of state as the Chairman of the Council of State. Delegations from countries such as Cuba, Bulgaria and Mongolia attended the parade, including the United States, which was represented by Chargé d'affaires John R. Davis. It was also attended by Nikolai Ryzhkov, a then full member of the 26th Soviet Politburo and future Premier of the Soviet Union.

== See also ==
- Victory Day (9 May)
- 1985 Moscow Victory Day Parade
