= Victory Park, Dushanbe =

Park in Dushanbe, Tajikistan

Coordinates: 38°34′59″N 68°48′43″E

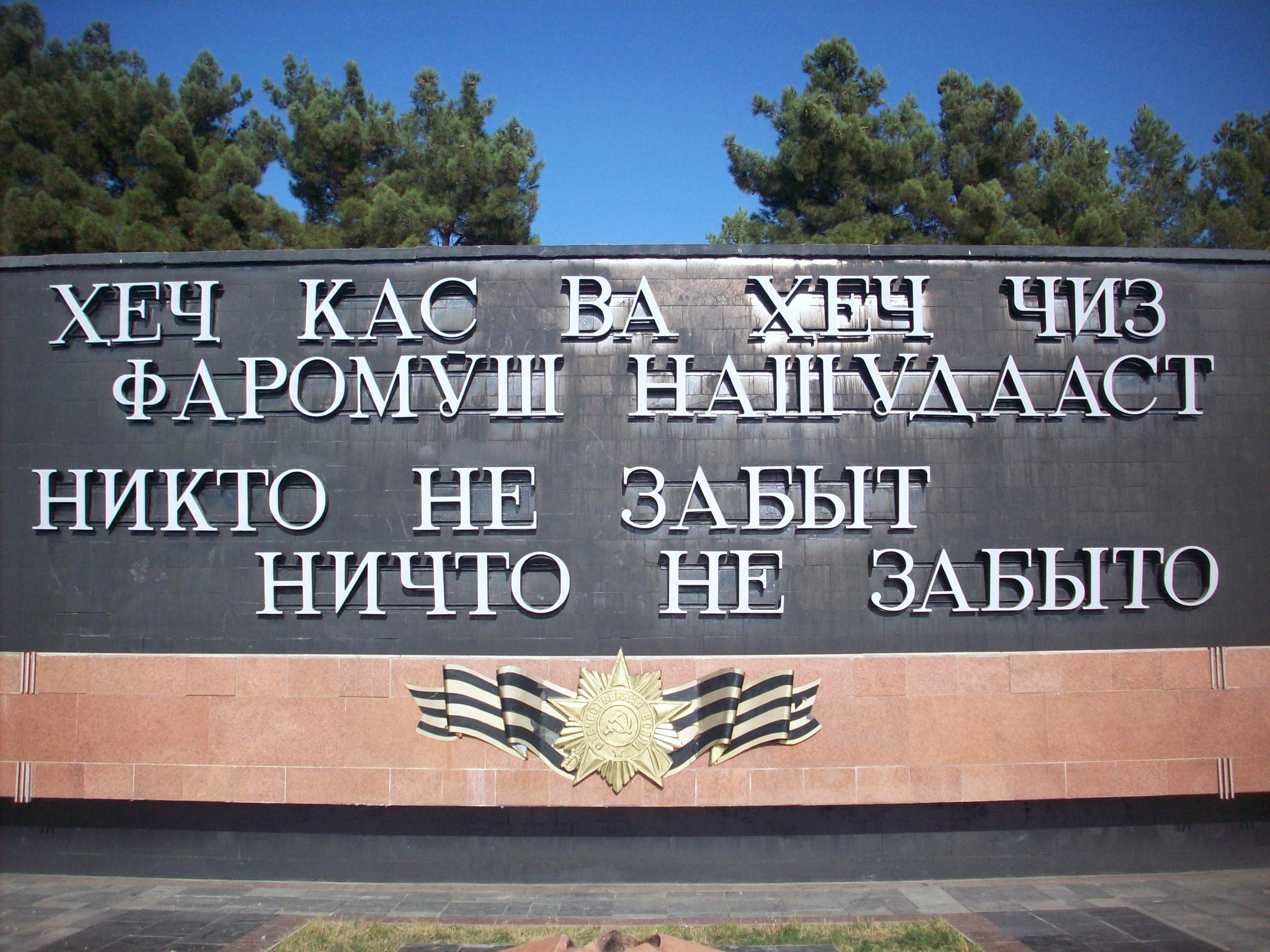
The park in 2009.

Victory Park (Tajik: Боғи Ғалаба, romanized: Boği Ğalaba; Russian: Парк Победы, romanized: Park Pobedy) is a park in honor of the Great Patriotic War located in the mountainous part of Dushanbe in Tajikistan. The park was completed in 1985.

== Overview ==
Victory Park is a favorite vacation for citizens. The park has a cafe which is open in Summer, located adjacent to a funicular. On holidays, Victory Day parades are in the park such as in 2015 and 2017. During Navruz, the park was decorated with 80,000 flowers of various types.

=== The area in general ===
Victory Park was opened in honor of the 40th anniversary of the Victory in the Great Patriotic War, however, the architectural and sculptural memorial complex was built in 1975. The central area is filled with an eternal flame, an alley of Heroes with high relief and sculpture Mother. At the foot of the stair is a granite slab with inscriptions in Tajik soldiers that were awarded the title of Hero of the Soviet Union.

== Gallery ==
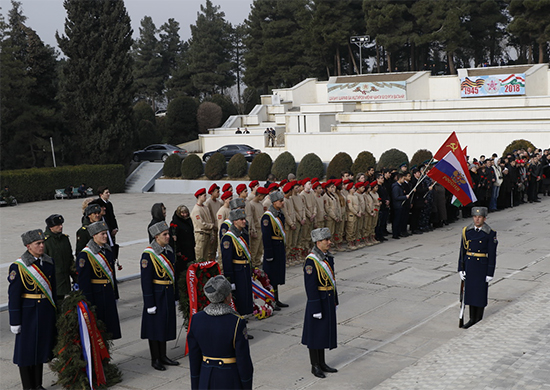
A wreath laying ceremony in the park.

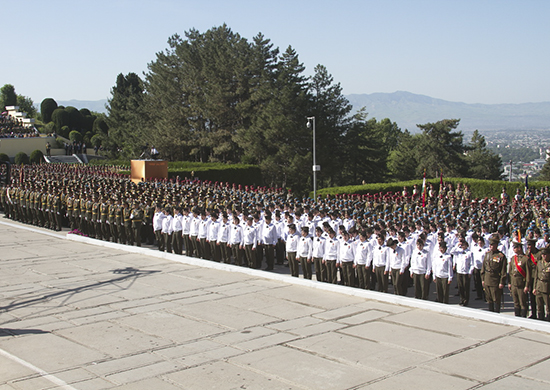
A parade in the park in 2017.

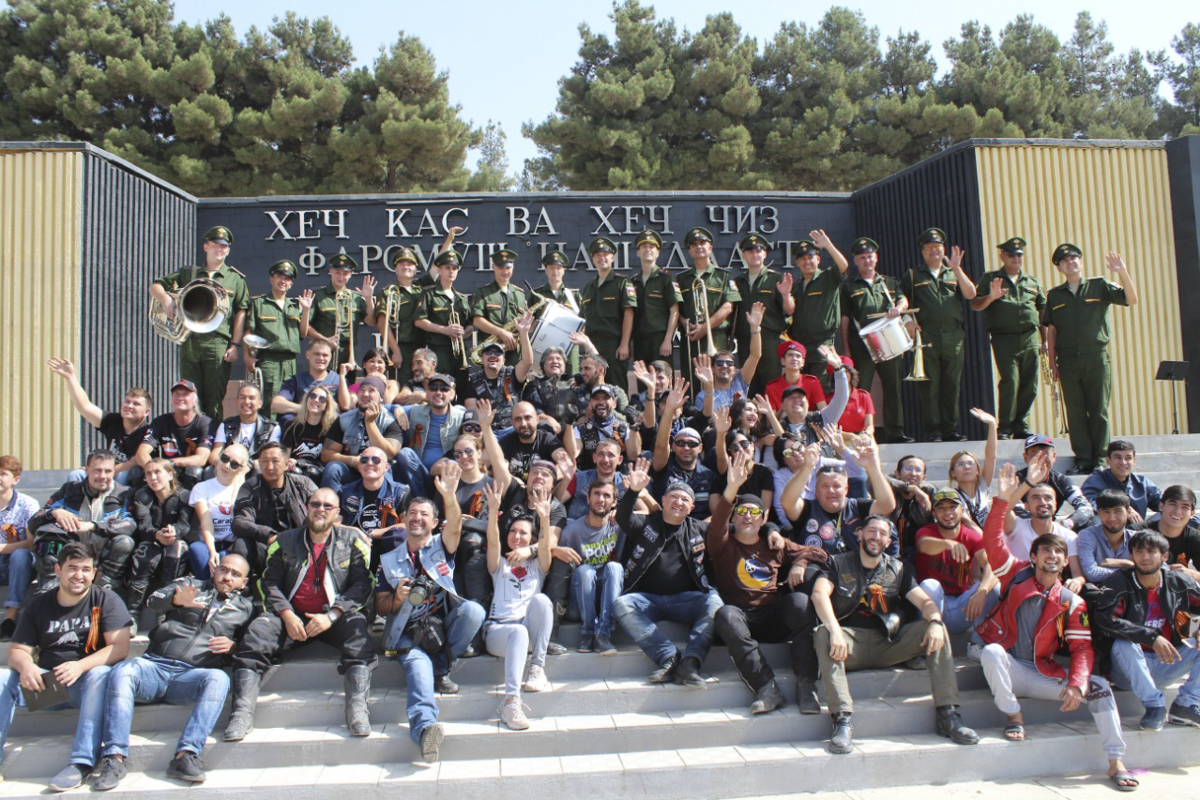
The military band of the Russian 201st Military Base at Victory Park.

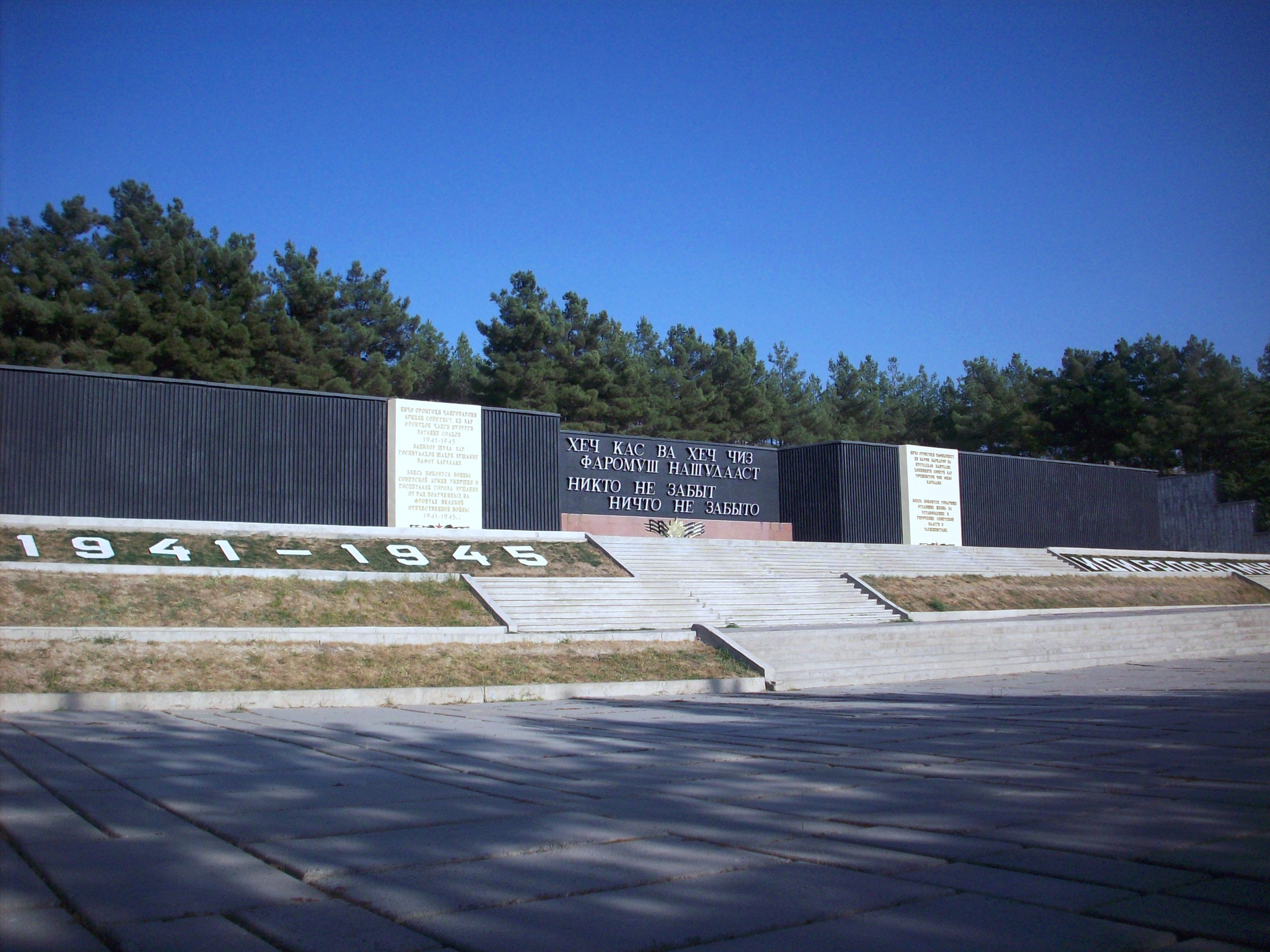
The World War 2 Memorial.
