= 1985 Moscow Victory Day Parade =

Russian military parade

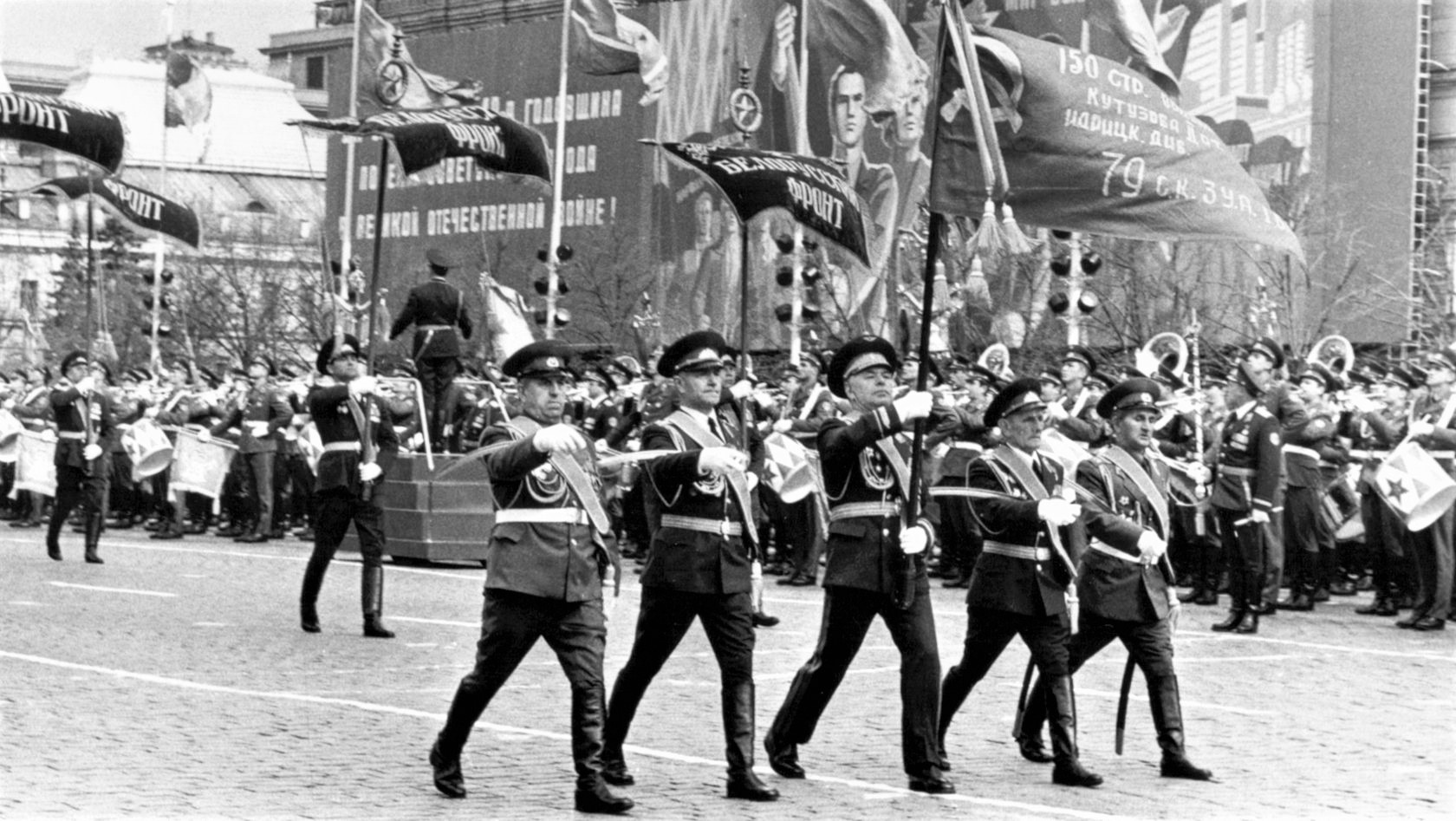
Nikolai Skomorokhov and a color guard of veterans trooping the Victory Banner across Red Square.

The 1985 Moscow Victory Day Parade (Russian: Парад Победы, romanized: Parad Pobedy) was held on 9 May 1985 on the Red Square in Moscow to commemorate the 40th anniversary of the Victory in Europe. The parade marked the Soviet Union's victory in the Great Patriotic War. It was the first V-Day parade held since 1965, and the third of four Victory Day parades held during the Soviet Union's existence.

Prior to 1965 Victory Day was not a major holiday and parades were not held, with the exception of the 1945 Victory Day Parade. The Victory Parade of 1985 was the third made after 1945 Victory Day Parade. After this parade next would be held 1990.

The parade was observed by Soviet leaders from the Lenin Mausoleum. Major political figures attending were General Secretary Mikhail Gorbachev, and Minister of Defense Marshal Sergei Sokolov among others. The parade was commanded by the Moscow Military District Commander General of the Army Pyotr Lushev, and was his last major national parade in this capacity. During this parade veterans marched in Red Square for the first time, the next time being in 1990.

== Full order of the marchpast ==
Following the limousine carrying General of the Army Lushev, the parade marched past Red Square in the following order:

=== Military bands ===
- Massed Military Bands of the Moscow Military District

=== Ground column ===
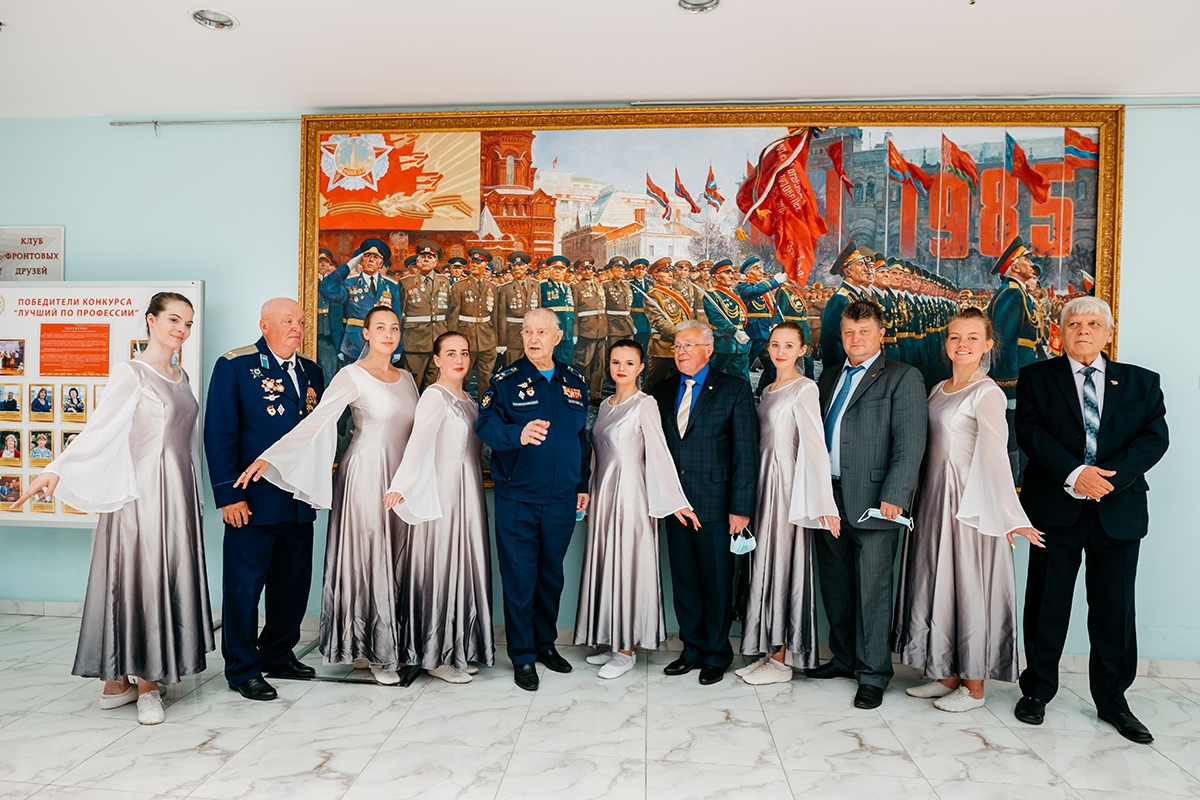
Soviet Air Force veterans in front of a portrait depicting participants in the 1985 parade.

- Corps of Drums of the Moscow Military Music College
- Victory Banner Color Guard
- Front Standards
- Colour guard battalion of regimental, brigade and division colors of the Soviet Army
- Veterans regiment
  - Heroes of the Soviet Union
  - Recipients of the Order of Glory
  - Veteran participants of the Moscow Victory Parade of 1945
  - Veterans of the Polish People's Army (Polish 1st Infantry Division)
  - Veterans of the Czechoslovak People's Army (Czechoslovak 1st Corps)
  - Partisans
  - Civil awardees of the Order of Labour Glory
- Historical regiment
- M. V. Frunze Military Academy
- V. I. Lenin Military Political Academy
- Military Artillery Academy "Felix Dzerzhinsky"
- Military Armored Forces Academy Marshal Rodion Malinovsky
- Military Engineering Academy
- Military Academy of Chemical Defense and Control
- Yuri Gagarin Air Force Academy
- Prof. Nikolai Zhukovsky Air Force Engineering Academy
- M. V. Frunze Naval College
- 98th Airborne Division
- Moscow Border Guards Institute of the Border Defence Forces of the KGB "Moscow City Council"
- 366th Guards Marine Brigade of the Baltic Fleet
- OMSDON Ind. Motorized Division of the Internal Troops of the Ministry of Internal Affairs of the USSR "Felix Dzerzhinsky"
- Suvorov Military School
- Nakhimov Naval School
- Moscow Military High Command Training School "Supreme Soviet of the Russian SFSR"

=== Mobile Column ===
- Historical segment
  - GAZ-67B
  - T-34
  - SU-100
  - SU-76
  - 53-K
  - ML-20
  - M-30
  - B-4
  - A-19
  - Katyusha rocket launchers (BM-13Ns)
  - 61-K
  - 52-K
- 2nd Guards Tamanskaya Motorized Rifle Division
  - BRDM-2
  - BTR-70
  - BMP-2
- 98th Airborne Division
  - BMD-1
- 4th Guards Kantermirovsky Tank Division
  - T-72
  - T-80
- Rocket Forces and Field Artillery
  - BM-21 Grad
  - 2S1 Gvozdika
  - 2S3 Akatsiya
  - 2K12 Kub
  - 9K52 Luna-M
  - SS-1 Scud

== Music ==
Providing the ceremonial music for the parade was the massed bands of the Moscow Military District, under the overall direction of Major General Nikolay Mikhailov.

Inspection and address

1. Jubilee Slow March "25 Years of the Red Army" (Юбилейный встречный марш "25 лет РККА) by Semeon Tchenertsky
2. Slow March of the Tankmen (Встречный Марш Танкистов) by Semeon Tchenertsky
3. Slow March of the Guards of the Navy (Гвардейский Встречный Марш Военно-Морского Флота) by Nikolai Pavlocich Ivanov-Radkevich
4. Slow March of the Officers Schools (Встречный Марш офицерских училищ) by Semyon Tchernetsky)
5. Slow March Victory (Встречный Марш «Победа») by Yuriy Griboyedov
6. Slow March of the Officers Schools (Встречный Марш офицерских училищ) by Semyon Tchernetsky)
7. Slow March (Встречный Марш) by Dmitry Pertsev
8. Slow March of the Red Army (Встречный Марш Красной Армии) by Semyon Tchernetsky
9. Slow March (Встречный Марш) by Severian Ganichev
10. Slow March Victory (Встречный Марш «Победа») by Yuriy Griboyedov
11. Slow March of the Guards of the Navy (Гвардейский Встречный Марш Военно-Морского Флота) by Nikolai Pavlocich Ivanov-Radkevich
12. Slow March (Встречный Марш) by Viktor Sergeyebich Runov
13. Glory (Славься) by Mikhail Glinka
14. Signal Everyone, listen! (Сигнал «Слушайте все!») by unknown composer
15. State Anthem of the Soviet Union (Государственный Гимн Советского Союза) by Alexander Alexandrov
16. Fanfare (Фанфара)

Infantry Column

1. Long Live our State (Да здравствует наша держава) by Boris Aleksandrov
2. "The Sacred War" (Священная война) by Alexandr Alexandrov
3. Farewell of Slavianka (Прощание Славянки) by Vasiliy Agapkin
4. Victory Day (День Победы) by David Fyodorovich Tukhmanov
5. In Defense of the Homeland (В защиту Родины) by Viktor Sergeyevich Runov
6. On Guard for the Peace (На страже Мира) by Boris Alexandrovich Diev
7. Combat March (Строевой Марш) by Dmitry Illarionovich Pertsev
8. Air March (Авиамарш) by Yuliy Abramovich Khait
9. Leningrad (Ленинград) by Viktor Sergeyeich Runov
10. We are the Army of the People (Мы Армия Народа) by Georgy Viktorovich Mavsesyan
11. Sports March (Спортивный Марш) by Valentin Volkov
12. Victory Day (День Победы) by David Fyodorovich Tukhmanov
13. Long Live our State (Да здравствует наша держава) by Boris Aleksandrov

Mobile Column

1. Victorious March (Победный Марш) by Nikolai Pavlocich Ivanov-Radkevich
2. Salute to Moscow (Салют Москвы) by Semyon Tchernetsky
3. Defenders of Moscow (Защитников Москвы) by Boris Alexandrovich Mokroysov
4. Farewell of Slavianka (Прощание Славянки) by Vasiliy Agapkin
5. Old March (Старинный Марш) by Isaac Tchernetsky
6. March of the Guards Mortar Personnel (Марш Гвардейцев-миномётчиков) by Semyon Tchernetsky
7. March of the Tankmen (Марш Танкистов) by Semyon Tchernetsky

Conclusion

1. Invincible and legendary (Несокрушимая и легендарная) by Alexander Alexandrov
2. Victory Day (День Победы) by David Fyodorovich Tukhmanov
3. Invincible and legendary (Несокрушимая и легендарная) by Alexander Alexandrov
