= Oleg Belokonev =

Belarusian general (born 1965)

Major General Oleg Belokonev
- Алег Аляксеевіч Белаконеў; Олег Алексеевич Белоконев
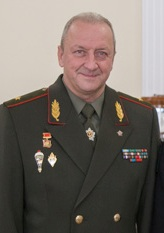
- Belokonev in 2018
- Born: 15 May 1965 (age 61); Barabash, Primorsky Krai, RSFSR, Soviet Union
- Military career
- Allegiance: USSR (until 1991); Belarus
- Branch: Soviet Army; Belarusian Ground Forces
- Service years: 1983–2019
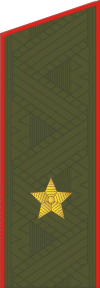
- Rank: Major General
- Commands: Special Forces of Belarus; General Staff of the Armed Forces of Belarus
- Awards: Order "For Service to the Homeland in the Armed Forces of Belarus"

Major General Oleg Alexeyevich Belokonev (Belarusian: Алег Аляксеевіч Белаконеў, Aleh Alyakseyevich Belakoneu, Russian: Олег Алексеевич Белоконев; born 15 May 1965) is a Belarusian general who was the Chief of the General Staff of the Armed Forces of Belarus from 2014 to 2019. He notably oversaw the Zapad 2017 exercise with Russia during his tenure as Chief of the General Staff.

== Biography ==
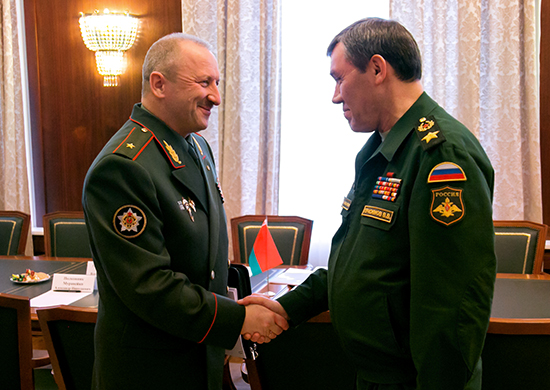
Belokonev (right) with the Chief of the General Staff of Russia, Army General Valery Gerasimov.

He was born on 15 May 1965 in a rural village in the Primorsky Krai region of the Russian Soviet Federal Socialist Republic. He is of Russian origin. He first began his service in the Armed Forces of the USSR in the early 1980s. He graduated with honors in 1987 from the Omsk Higher All-Arms Command School and was immediately sent to serve in the armed forces thereafter. Belokonev then began to rise to the position of platoon commander and eventually commander of a motorized rifle battalion.

In 1999 Belokonev graduated with a gold medal from the Military Academy of Belarus before going back into active duty service in the Armed Forces of Belarus. In the early 2000s, Belokonev primarily served in the area of operations of the Grodno Military Commandant of the Western Operational Command.

In August 2010, he was appointed commander of Belarusian Special Forces. Just 5 months later, on the eve of Armed Forces Day, Colonel Belokonev was promoted to the rank of Major General. On 11 January 2014 he was appointed by President Alexander Lukashenko, to the position of Chief of the General Staff of the Armed Forces, also concurrently serving as First Deputy Minister of Defence of Belarus. He is a recipient of the Order "For Service to the Homeland in the Armed Forces of Belarus" having been awarded the order in 2014. He was dismissed in December 2019.

In 2019, Belokonev became member of the lower chamber of the Parliament of Belarus following a rigged election. As member of parliament, Belokonev is Chairperson of the Standing Commission on National Security.

== Call for murdering Belarusian opposition ==
On 1 October 2021, at the funeral of a KGB officer killed during the raid of the home of programmer Andrei Zeltser, himself killed by the KGB during the incident, Belokonev publicly called for murdering members of the opposition to revenge hypothetical killings of state security officials:

In what families were these people raised? I think we deal too gently with them and the suchlike. For some reason they do not act in a lawful manner, and we try to do everything within the scope of the law; [we try] to talk to them within the limits of the law, to persuade them within the limits of the law, to reason them within the limits of the law. One should follow Putin’s words and ‘waste them in the sh*thouse’ – 20, 100 persons for one our guy as a lesson to everyone else… So that no one was offended. It may be rude, but honest,”

== Sanctions ==
In December 2022, General Belokonev was added to the Canadian sanctions list.

== Personal life ==
Belokonev is married with two daughters.
