= Belarusian Armed Forces Academic Song and Dance Ensemble =

Belarusian Armed Forces Academic Song and Dance Ensemble Акадэмічны ансамбль песні і танца Узброеных Сіл Рэспублікі Беларусь
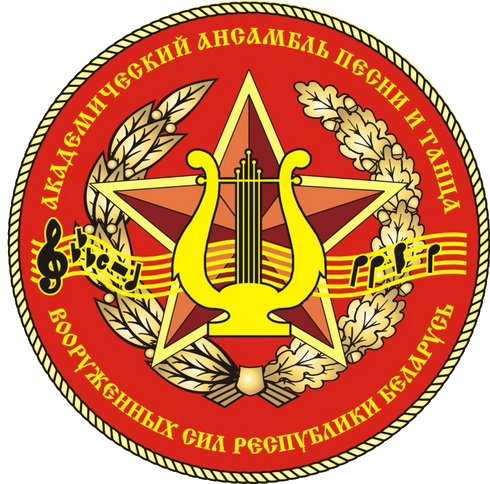

Background information
- Origin: Belarus
- Genres: classical, folk, pop
- Years active: 1938–Present

The Belarusian Armed Forces Academic Song and Dance Ensemble (Belarusian: Акадэмічны ансамбль песні і танца Узброеных Сіл Рэспублікі Беларусь, romanized: Akademičny ansambĺ pieśni i tanca Uzbrojenych Sil Respubliki Bielaruś) is a musical unit of the Belarusian Armed Forces that is stationed in Minsk.

== History ==
The group first formed as a freelance unit on 17 February 1938 at a sanatorium for Red Army officers in the village of Gnyozdovo (near Smolensk). By order of Marshal of the Soviet Union Klement Voroshilov on 9 January 1939, the group was formally introduced as the Red Army Song and Dance Ensemble of the Belarusian Special Military District. In 1940, the ensemble followed the example of the military district headquarters, and was transferred to Minsk from Smolensk. During the World War II (known as the Great Patriotic War in Russia and Belarus), the ensemble served on the frontlines to regularly perform 4-5 performances a day for frontline troops, which resulted in over 40 artists being awarded with honorary medals such as the Order of Glory. On the 1945 Victory Day (9 May), the team performed in the liberated Soviet city of Königsberg (now Kaliningrad).

In 1949, it became known as the Red Army Song and Dance Ensemble of the Belarusian Military District, which served Soviet Army troops in the Belarusian SSR. In the postwar period, the team grew and progressed in various ways, performing for soldiers in the garrisons on Belarusian territory, as well as performing abroad which included a 1982 trip to the Polish People's Republic and a 1986 trip to the Democratic Republic of Afghanistan. In 1990, the ensemble conducted a European tour which included France, Netherlands, Portugal, Germany, Spain and other countries in a sign of a thaw in East-West relations. In March 1992, the Red Army Song and Dance Ensemble was renamed to its current name. In 1998, on the 60th anniversary of the founding of the ensemble, the ensemble was given the honorary title of being an "Academic Ensemble", and on 1 September 2009, the ensemble became an official state institution.

== Notable members ==
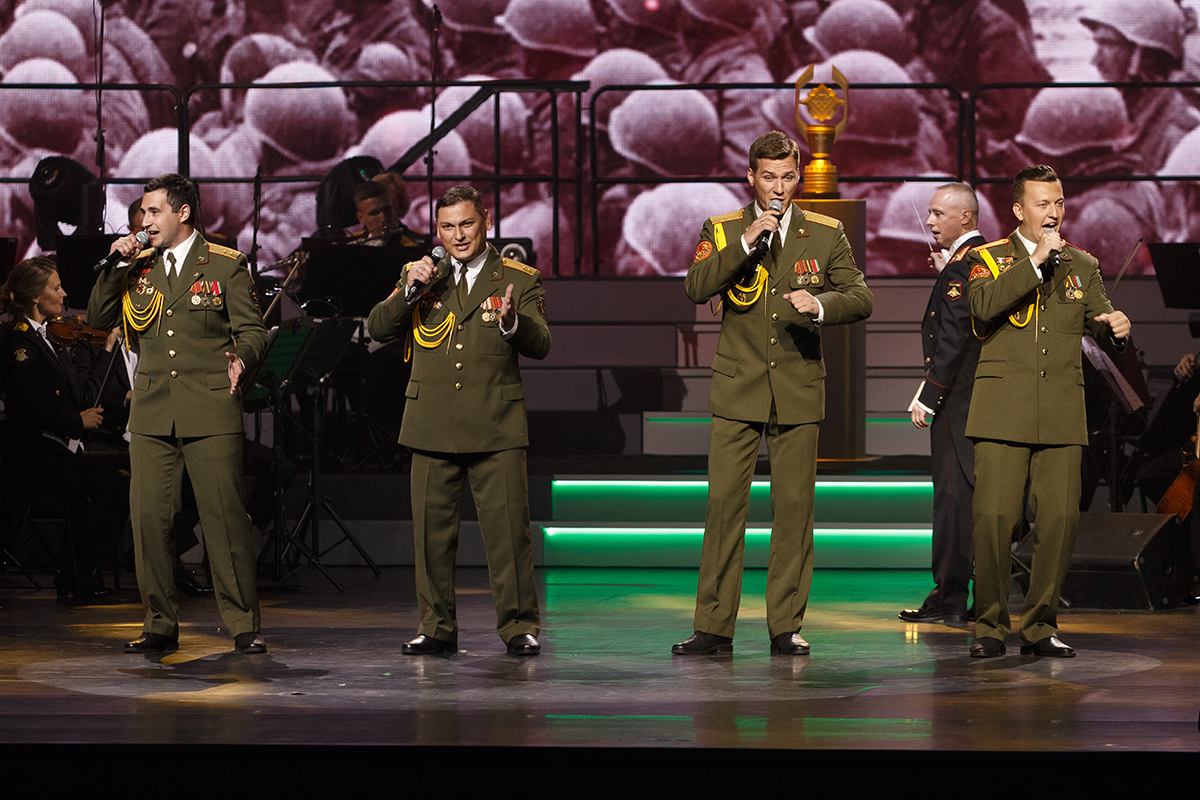
Members of the ensemble during the closing ceremony of the International Army Games in 2020

- Victor Vuyachich — a Belarusian Soviet crooner
- Valery Pryshchaponak
- George Svetashav
