= 2021 Minsk apartment shooting =

Killing of Belarusian IT worker

Andrei Zeltser in his apartment, holding a shotgun and glancing at the camera.

On 28 September 2021, Andrei Zeltser, a Belarusian IT worker, was killed in Minsk by members of the State Security Committee of the Republic of Belarus (Belarusian KGB) who conducted a raid on his apartment. After a door breaching, a shootout took place, in which Zeltser fatally shot Dmitry Fedosyuk, a KGB agent from the Alpha Group unit. Zeltser was then killed by the KGB. Zeltser was subsequently called a "terrorist" by the government. According to the state-owned Belarusian Telegraph Agency, "members of an extremist group with ties to the opposition, supposedly, lived in the apartment", referring to Zeltser, 31, and his wife, who was arrested.

More than a hundred people were detained in the aftermath of the event, in connection to social media comments, and some were subsequently given prison sentences.

== Participants ==
Andrei Yuryevich Zeltser (Belarusian: Андрэй Юр'евіч Зельцэр, Russian: Андрей Зельцер; born 1989) was an opposition supporter and has been described as a dissident. (Note: Charter 97 establishes Zeltser as an author of a 'manifesto in which he called on those who disagree with the award of victory to Alexander Lukashenko to "go to the end"'.) According to a media report, on 16 August 2021 he posted an image of the white-red-white historical flag of Belarus (which has been used as a symbol of the opposition to the regime of Alexander Lukashenko) and "made a call to the people to unite and fight for the future of the country". He worked for EPAM Systems, a Pennsylvania-headquartered software engineering company started by Belarusians. There was speculation that Zeltser was a citizen of the United States; a U.S. official said that more information on this is being sought. Zeltser raised an eight-year-old son, who was at school at the time of the shoot-out.

Dmitry Yuryevich Fedosyuk (Belarusian: Дзмітрый Юр’евіч Федасюк, Russian: Дмитрий Федосюк; born June 5, 1990), was the KGB agent killed in the shoot-out. He was a senior lieutenant at the KGB's Alpha Group unit and had the call-sign Nirvana. His career at the KGB began as an accountant. His mother was the head of a department within the KGB. He was married and had a five-year-old daughter. Fedosyuk was posthumously awarded the Order for Personal Courage.

== Aftermath ==
=== Mass arrests ===
An edited video of the incident, which was recorded on multiple cameras, was broadcast by Belarus state TV channels. (Note: According to Radio Free Europe/Radio Liberty, "It's not clear if the way the video was edited accurately presents the true sequence of events.") This was followed by arrests of more than 100 people in connection to social media comments about the event, on charges of insulting a government official or inciting social hatred. By 3 November 2021, more than 136 people were detained for 'trying to whitewash' Zeltser's name in social networks. For more than a month, detainees were denied access to legal counsel. Human rights activists said that the prison officials had not allowed basic necessities to be delivered to the prisoners.

In February 2023, the Viasna Human Rights Centre reported that several of the detainees were released after having served their full sentences.

=== Arrest of Gennady Mozheiko ===
Among the arrested was journalist Gennady Mozheiko, a correspondent of the Belarusian version of Komsomolskaya Pravda (KP v Belorusi). Mozheiko was detained in Moscow and sent to the Okrestina Detention Centre in Minsk. The Daily Telegraph reported on an allegation that he was subject to extraterritorial abduction in Moscow, by Belarusian agents; the official Belarusian account is that he was arrested in Belarus, upon crossing the border. He was jailed for having written a news piece that featured a former classmate of Zeltser describing him in positive terms; the article was published on September 28, 2021, and was deleted the next morning. The website of Komsomolskaya Pravda in Belarus was blocked by authorities on the same day; the newspaper ceased its operations in Minsk. Russia expressed dissatisfaction over these developments, based on an expectation that work of "[their] media outlets" would not be interfered with, while also citing freedom of the press. Nevertheless, the Belarusian authorities charged Mozheiko with 'whitewashing a criminal'. As of October 16, 2021, Mozheiko is charged with 'inciting hatred' and 'an insult to a representative of the authority' under the articles of the State Criminal Code.

=== Official reactions ===
On 1 October 2021, at the funeral of the KGB officer killed during the raid, Major General Oleg Belokonev publicly called for murdering members of the opposition as a revenge against hypothetical killings of state security officials:

In what families were these people raised? I think we deal too gently with them and the suchlike. For some reason they do not act in a lawful manner, while we try to do everything within the scope of the law; [we try] to talk to them within the limits of the law, to persuade them within the limits of the law, to reason them within the limits of the law. One should follow Putin’s words and "waste them in the outhouse" (Note: In 1999 Vladimir Putin said: "if we capture them [Chechen rebels] in the toilet then we will waste them in the outhouse", see Putinisms) – 20, 100 persons for one our guy... So that no one dared to do the same. It may be rude, but honest.

Lukashenko held a minute's silence to honor the agent who was killed, and said that the government would "not forgive them [opposition supporters] for the death of this guy."

=== Opposition reactions ===
Prominent opposition activist Pavel Latushko said that "a fair investigation (of the incident) is impossible under Lukashenko", and: "Not only Andrei Zeltser — a calm, kind and compassionate man — has been declared a terrorist. All of those who disagree with the regime have been declared terrorists."
