= 38th Separate Guards Air Assault Brigade =

Special forces brigade of the Armed Forces of Belarus

38th Separate Guards Air Assault Brigade (2 August 2016–present) 38th Separate Guards Mobile Brigade (1 September 1995–2 August 2016) 38th Separate Guards Airborne Brigade (1 June 1990–1 September 1995) 38th Separate Guards Air Assault Brigade (October 1979–1 June 1990)
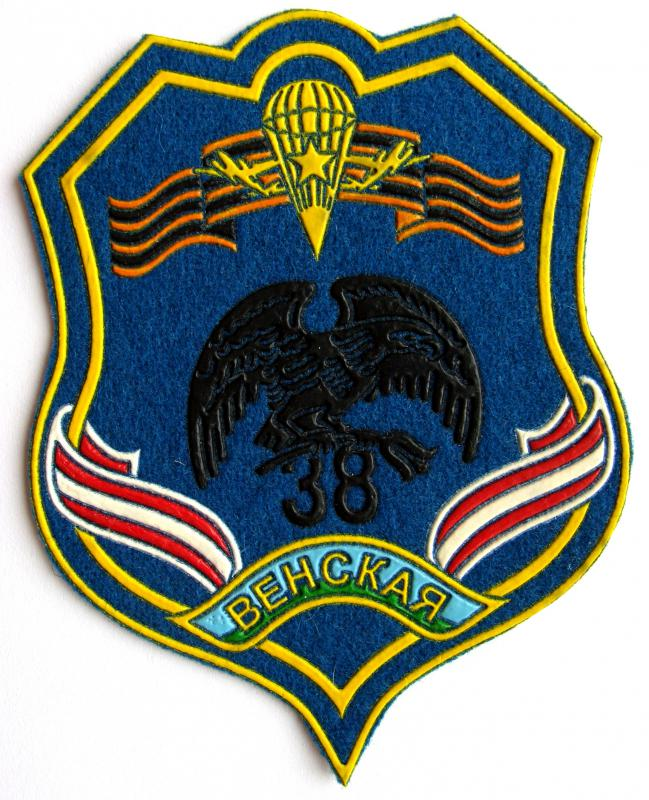
- Active: 1979–present
- Country: Soviet Union (1979–1992); Belarus (1992–present)
- Branch: Soviet Ground Forces (1979–1990); Soviet Airborne Forces (1990–1992); Spetsnaz of Belarus (2003–present)
- Type: Airborne
- Size: Brigade
- Garrison/HQ: Brest
- Decorations: Order of the Red Banner
- Honorifics: Brest; Vienna

Commanders
- Current commander: Colonel Valery Bulygo
- Notable commanders: Vadim Denisenko

The 38th Separate Guards Red Banner Air Assault Brigade is a Special forces brigade of the Armed Forces of Belarus. It is currently based in Brest. The brigade was originally formed from the elements of the disbanded 105th Guards Vienna Airborne Division in 1979 as the 38th Separate Guards Air Assault Brigade. In 1990, it was transferred to the Soviet airborne and renamed the 38th Separate Guards Airborne Brigade. In January 1992, it was taken over by Belarus and was later renamed the 38th Guards Mobile Brigade. The brigade was renamed the 38th Guards Air Assault Brigade in 2016.

== History ==
The 38th Separate Guards Air Assault Brigade was formed in October 1979 from the headquarters of the 105th Guards Airborne Division in Brest, part of the Belorussian Military District. The official day of formation is considered to be 10 November. The brigade was composed of three airborne battalions, an air assault battalion, an artillery battalion and an antiaircraft artillery battalion. From 4 to 12 September 1981, the brigade participated in the exercise "West-81". Between August 1987 and June 1989, the brigade was commanded by Vitaly Raevsky. Due to the First Nagorno-Karabakh War, the brigade was deployed to Baku in January 1990. On 1 June 1990, the brigade was transferred to the Soviet Airborne Forces and renamed the 38th Separate Guards Airborne Brigade. Its air assault battalion was disbanded and the antiaircraft artillery battalion became a battery. After the Dissolution of the Soviet Union, the brigade was transferred to the Armed Forces of Belarus.

On 1 September 1995, the brigade transferred to the Mobile Forces of the Republic of Belarus and was renamed the 38th Separate Guards Mobile Brigade. From 2002 to 31 January 2003, the brigade was part of the Ground Forces. On 1 February, it moved to the Belarusian Army Spetsnaz.

Between 2008 and 2011, the brigade was commanded by Vadim Denisenko, who later became commander of the Special Forces of Belarus.

On 3 June 2015, it was reported that the brigade had been brought to full combat readiness on the Ukrainian border. Between 15 and 27 June, it was announced by China and Belarus that the two countries would stage Exercise Dashing Eagle 2015 with PLA paratroopers and the 38th's 382nd Mobile Battalion participating.

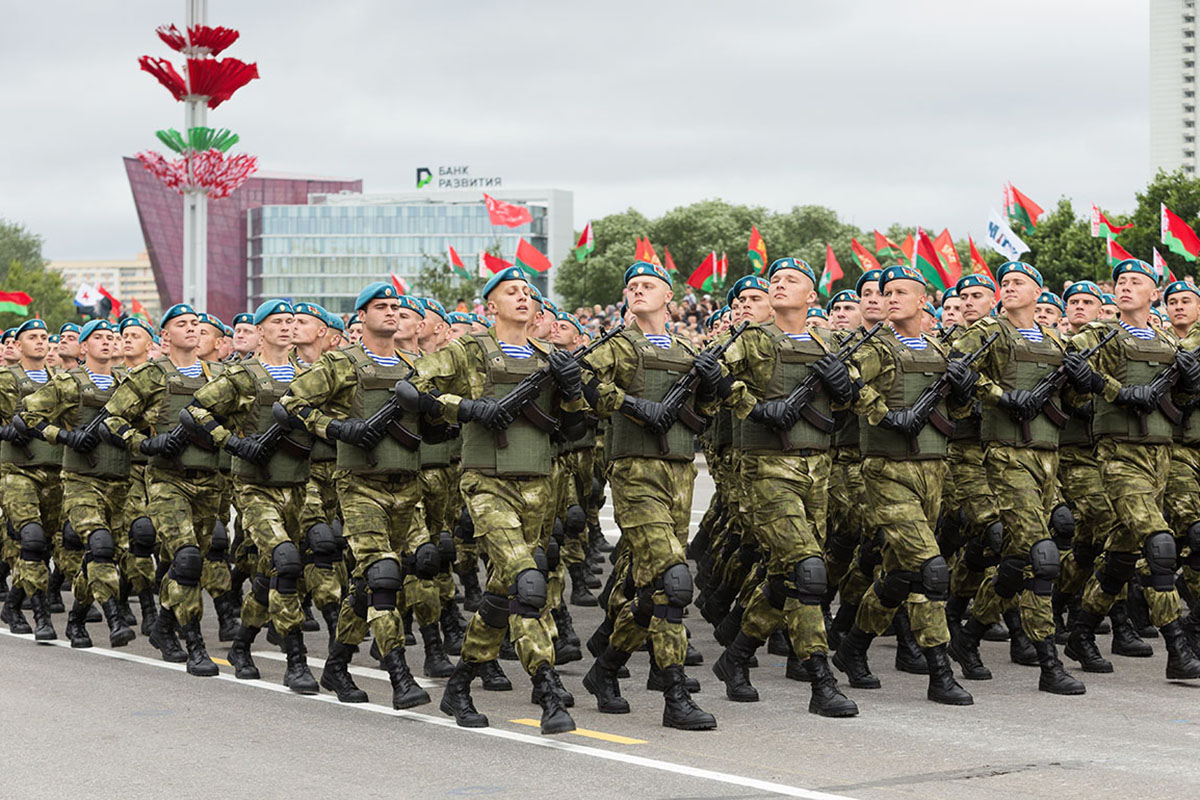
The brigade at the 2017 Minsk Independence Day Parade.

On 2 August 2016, the brigade was renamed the 38th Separate Guards Air Assault Brigade, restoring its original name. The brigade received the honorific Brest after its base location on 14 January 2020. The brigade was used to suppress the 2020 Belarusian protests in Brest in August of that year.

== Commanders ==
- Colonel Lyutsian Surint (1991 - 199?)
- Lieutenant Colonel Valery Sakhashchyk (1999-2002)
- Colonel Vadim Denisenko (2008-2011)
- Colonel Viktar Hulevich (2011 - 2013)
- Colonel Dmitry Ptashnik (2013 - 2015)
- Colonel Dmitry Sobol (2015 - 2018)
- Colonel Alexander Ilyukevich (2018 - 2021)
- Colonel Dmitry Korshunov (2021 - 2024)
- Colonel Valery Bulygo (since 2024)
