= 5th Spetsnaz Brigade =

Belarusian special forces brigade

- Active: 1963 – present
- Country: Soviet Union (1963–1991); Belarus (1992–present)
- Branch: Soviet Army (1963–1991); Special Forces of Belarus (1992–present)
- Type: Special forces
- Garrison/HQ: Marjina Horka
- Motto(s): Anywhere, anytime, any problem
- Engagements: Soviet–Afghan War, Nagorno-Karabakh conflict, Libyan Civil War (2011)

Commanders
- Current commander: Colonel Dmitry Kuchuk

The 5th Spetsnaz Brigade (Russian: 5-я отдельная бригада специального назначения, romanized: pyataya otdel'naya brigada spetsial'nogo naznacheniya; Belarusian: 5-я асобная брыгада спэцыяльнага прызначэньня) is a special forces brigade of the Armed Forces of Belarus, formerly part of the Soviet Spetsnaz GRU.

== History ==
It was formed at Marjina Horka, Minsk Region, 1 January 1963 as the 5th Special Forces Brigade GRU. It initially had two battalions. On 3 April 1978 renamed 5th Independent Special Forces Brigade GRU. The 5th Spetsnaz Brigade would be involved in the Soviet-Afghan War, Spetsnaz Forces in Afghanistan were issued AK-74s, RPKs, RPDs, AKS-74u's, Dragunovs, and were issued KS-23 riot shotguns.

In the last years of the Soviet Union, the brigade had an all-professional company formation manned entirely by officers and praporshchiks. The 5th Spetsnaz Brigade took the oath of allegiance to Belarus on 31 December 1992, now part of the Special Forces of Belarus along with two brigades formerly part of the 103rd Guards Airborne Division.

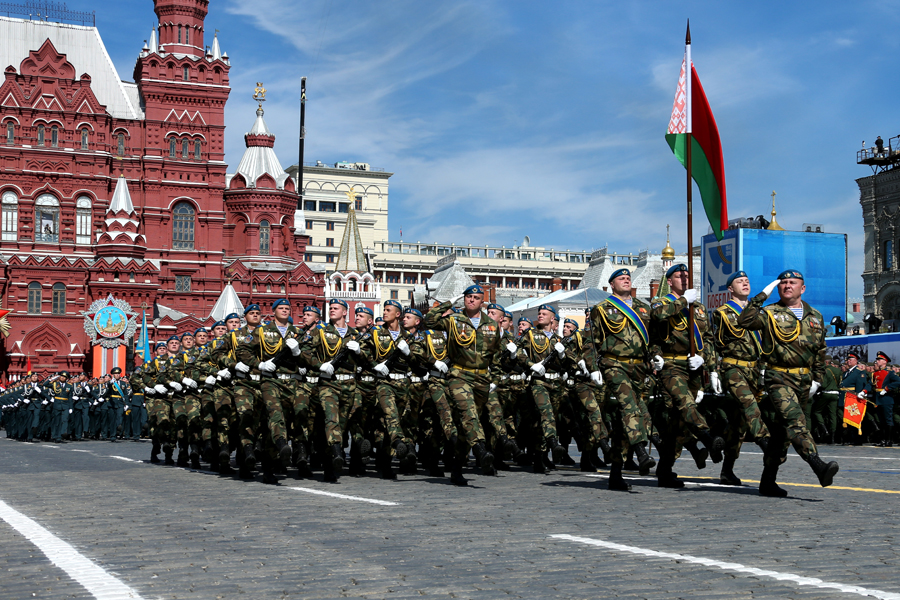
Troops of the brigade during the 2015 Moscow Victory Day Parade

On 12 September 2002, President Alexander Lukashenko presented the commander of the brigade with a new independence-era Battle Banner instead of the Soviet one. The brigade is considered to be one of the best formations in the Armed Forces. In 2008, commandos from the Venezuelan National Directorate of Intelligence and Prevention Services visited Belarus, where they received training from the BFSO Dynamo and the brigade. It participated in the Zapad 2009 exercise joint exercise with the Russian Armed Forces. According to some reports, in 2011, servicemen of the 334th Separate Unit of the brigade took part in the Libyan Civil War. In 2010 and 2015, the brigade represented Belarus at the Moscow Victory Day Parade on Red Square, marching in the historical part of the parade.

In August 2020, 5th Spetsnaz Brigade participated in the suppression of the protests in Belarus. On August 11, Hienadz Shutau was shot in Brest by captain Roman Gavrilov of 5th Spetsnaz Brigade.

== Commanders ==
The following is a list of commanders of the brigade:

- Ivan Kovalevsky (1962–1966)
- Ivan Kovalenko (1966–1968)
- Gennady Yevtushenko (1969–1972)
- Valentin Kartashov (1973–1976)
- Yevgeny Faleev (1976–1979)
- Grigory Kolb (1979–1982)
- Eduard Ivanov (1982–1984)
- Yuri Sapalov (1984–1987)
- Dmitry Gerasimov (1987–1988)
- Vladimir Borodach (1988–1991)
- Ivan Mole (1991–1992)
- Valery Gaydukevich (1992–1995)
- Ivan Vilchkovsky (1995–1999)
- Alexander Chmyrev (1999–2003)
- Georgy Zlatin (2003–2005)
- Pavel Tikhonov (2005–2007)
- Vladimir Karuk (2007—2010)
- Alexander Naumenko (2010–2012)
- Sergey Simkin (2012—2014)
- Alexey Popov (2014–2017)
- Colonel Dmitry Kuchuk (since 2017)
