= Military ranks of Belarus =

The Military ranks of Belarus are the military insignia used by the Armed Forces of Belarus. Being a former member of Soviet Union, Belarus shares a rank structure similar to that of Russia. Belarus is a landlocked country, and does not possess a navy.

== Commissioned officer ranks ==
The rank insignia of commissioned officers.

Rank group	General / flag officers				Senior officers			Junior officers
Belarusian Ground Forces
Belarusian Ground Forces	Вярхоўны галоўнакамандуючы Viarchoŭny haloŭnakamandujučy	Ґенэрал-палкоўнік; Gjeneral-palkoŭnik	Ґенэрал-лейтэнант; Gjeneral-liejtenant	Ґенэрал-маёр; Gjeneral-major	Палкоўнік; Palkoŭnik	Падпалкоўнік; Padpalkoŭnik	Маёр; Major	Капітан; Kapitan	Старшы лейтэнант Staršy liejtenant	Лейтэнант; Liejtenant	Малодшы лейтэнант Malodšy liejtenant
Belarusian Air Force
Belarusian Air Force		Ґенэрал-палкоўнік; Gjeneral-palkoŭnik	Ґенэрал-лейтэнант; Gjeneral-liejtenant	Ґенэрал-маёр; Gjeneral-major	Палкоўнік; Palkoŭnik	Падпалкоўнік; Padpalkoŭnik	Маёр; Major	Капітан; Kapitan	Старшы лейтэнант Staršy liejtenant	Лейтэнант; Liejtenant	Малодшы лейтэнант Malodšy liejtenant
Rank group	General / flag officers				Senior officers			Junior officers

== Other ranks ==
The rank insignia of non-commissioned officers and enlisted personnel.

Rank group	Senior NCOs						Junior NCOs	Enlisted
Belarusian Ground Forces
Belarusian Ground Forces	Старшы прапаршчык Staršy praparščyk	Прапаршчык; Praparščyk	Старшына; Staršyna	Старшы сяржант Staršy siaržant	Сяржант; Siaržant	Малодшы сяржант Malodšy siaržant	Яфрэйтар; Jafrejtar	Радавы; Radavy
Belarusian Air Force
Belarusian Air Force	Старшы прапаршчык Staršy praparščyk	Прапаршчык; Praparščyk	Старшына; Staršyna	Старшы сяржант Staršy siaržant	Сяржант; Siaržant	Малодшы сяржант Malodšy siaržant	Яфрэйтар; Jafrejtar	Радавы; Radavy
Rank group	Senior NCOs						Junior NCOs	Enlisted
