= International Army Games =

Russian organized international military event

International Army Games Армейские международные игры
- Emblem of the games
- Frequency: Every 2 years
- Inaugurated: 2015
- Most recent: 2022
- Organizer: Russian MoD
- Headquarters: Moscow

The International Army Games (Russian: Армейские международные) is an annual international military sports event organized by the Ministry of Defence (MoD) of Russia. The event, which was first staged in August 2015, involved close to 30 countries taking part in dozens of competitions over two weeks to prove which is the most skilled. The games have been referred to as the War Olympics. In addition to the competition, the International Army Games includes a military theme park, a recruitment station, and souvenir shops.

== History ==
Participant countries of the 2019 International Army Games

- 2015 International Army Games: Took place in Russia from August 1–15.
- 2016 International Army Games: Took place from July 30 to August 13. 3,500 servicemen from 19 states fought in 23 competitions.
- 2017 International Army Games: Held from July 29 to August 12 in 5 countries: Russia, China, Azerbaijan, Belarus, and Kazakhstan. During the games 28 international competitions were held, including 5 new ones.
- 2018 International Army Games: Held from July 28 to August 11. The competitions were held in Armenia and Iran for the first time. Teams from Algeria, Vietnam, Myanmar, Pakistan, the Sudan and the Philippines also took part in the games for the first time.
- 2019 International Army Games: Planned to be organized in 32 disciplines hosted in 10 countries starting on August 3 in Korla. Russia, India, China, Azerbaijan, Armenia, Belarus, Iran, Mongolia, Uzbekistan and Kazakhstan are the countries hosting it. India hosted and won Stage 2 of the games, known as the 5th International Army Scout Masters Competition. Uzbekistan came second and Russia fourth.
- 2020 International Army Games: Held from August 22 to September 5. Russia won the competition while Belarus was second and Uzbekistan was third.
- 2021 International Army Games: Held from August 22 to September 4, 2021.
- Since 2023: Not held due to shortages stemming from the Russian invasion of Ukraine. In 2023, Russian Deputy Minister of Defence Alexander Fomin stated the games would take place in even years.

== Editions ==
| Year | Edition | Dates | Host country | Events | Champion |
|---|---|---|---|---|---|
| 2015 | 1 | | Russia | 13 | Russia |
| 2016 | 2 | | Russia | 23 | Russia |
| 2017 | 3 | | Russia | 28 | |
| 2018 | 4 | | Russia | 28 | Russia |
| 2019 | 5 | | Russia | | |
| 2020 | 6 | | Russia | 30 | Russia |
| 2021 | 7 | | Russia | | Russia |
| 2022 | 8 | | Russia | 34 | |

== Competitions ==
- Tank biathlon
- Suvorov Attack ("Suvorov Onslaught"): competition between crews/specialists of infantry combat vehicles
- Aviadarts: competition for flight crews
- Masters of artillery fire: artillery calculation competition
- Clear skies: competition among anti-aircraft units
- Excellence troop intelligence: competition between intelligence departments
- Open water: competition among dispatching units
- Safe route: competition among engineering units
- Safe environment: radiation, chemical and biological defense forces' competition
- International Army Scout Masters' Competition

=== 2020 events ===
Hosts:

1. Russia
2. Iran
3. India
4. Mongolia
5. Kazakhstan
6. Uzbekistan
7. Armenia
8. Azerbaijan
9. Belarus
10. China

Events

1. Tank Biathlon = Tank Crews Competition
2. Suvorov Attack = IFV Crews Competition
3. Sniper Frontier = Snipers Competition
4. Aviadarts = Flight Crews Competition
5. Airborne Platoon = Airborne Forces Platoons Competition
6. Seaborne Assault = Naval Infantry Units Competition
7. Sea Cup = Combat Ship Crews Competition
8. Depth = Divers Multidiscipline Competition
9. Masters Of Artillery Fire = Mortar Battery Squads Competition
10. Gunsmith Master = Maintenance Platoons Competition
11. Clear Sky = Ad Units Competition
12. Confident Reception = Competition Of Anti-Aircraft Missile Troops Units
13. Army Scout Masters = Army Reconnaissance Units Competition
14. Open Water = Pontoon Bridge Crews Competition
15. Safe Route = Combat Engineering Units Competition
16. Engineering Formula = Engineering Units Competition
17. Safe Environment = NBC Reconnaissance Crews Competition
18. Masters Of Armored Vehicles = Armored Vehicles Crews Competition
19. Elbrus Ring = Mountain Infantry Units Competition
20. True Friend = Dog Handlers Competition
21. Military Medical Relay Race = Medical Staff Competition
22. Field Kitchen = Food Service Specialists Competition
23. Guardian Of Order = Military Police Competition
24. Military Rally = Armored Vehicles Crews Competition
25. Warrior Of Peace = International Competition Of Military-Professional Servicemen Skills
26. Falcon Hunting = Uavs' Crews Competition
27. Road Patrol = Military Police Officers Competition
28. Emergency Area = Competition Among Emergency Rescue Units
29. Equestrian Marathon = Competition Among Horse Mounted Units
30. Polar Star = Special Operation Units Competition

== Participants ==
Note: O = Observer

For the first time, Bolivia and Rwanda participated in the 2022 Games.

| Countries | Participated in | | | | | | | |
|---|---|---|---|---|---|---|---|---|
| Countries | 2015 | 2016 | 2017 | 2018 | 2019 | 2020 | 2021 | 2022 |
| Russia (Host) | Yes | Yes | Yes | Yes | Yes | Yes | Yes | Yes |
| Abkhazia | | | | | | Yes | Yes | Yes |
| Afghanistan | | | | | | Yes | Yes | |
| Algeria | | O | | Yes | Yes | Yes | Yes | Yes |
| Angola | Yes | Yes | Yes | Yes | Yes | | | |
| Armenia | Yes | Yes | Yes | Yes | Yes | Yes | Yes | Yes |
| Austria | | O | | | | | | |
| Azerbaijan | Yes | Yes | Yes | Yes | Yes | Yes | Yes | Yes |
| Bangladesh | | | Yes | Yes | Yes | | | |
| Belarus | Yes | Yes | Yes | Yes | Yes | Yes | Yes | Yes |
| Bolivia | | | | | | | | Yes |
| Brazil | O | | | | O | | | |
| Burkina Faso | | | | | | | Yes | Yes |
| Cambodia | | | | | Yes | Yes | | Yes |
| Cameroon | | | | | | | | Yes |
| China | Yes | Yes | Yes | Yes | Yes | Yes | Yes | Yes |
| Cuba | | O | | | Yes | | | |
| Denmark | | | O | | | | | |
| Egypt | Yes | Yes | Yes | Yes | Yes | | Yes | |
| Equatorial Guinea | | | | | | Yes | | |
| Eswatini | | | | | | | | Yes |
| Finland | | | O | | | | | |
| France | | | | | O | | | |
| Germany | | O | O | | | | | |
| Greece | | Yes | Yes | Yes | Yes | Yes | | |
| Guinea | | | | | | | | Yes |
| India | Yes | Yes | Yes | Yes | Yes | | Yes | Yes |
| Indonesia | | | | O | | | Yes | |
| Iran | O | Yes | Yes | Yes | Yes | Yes | Yes | Yes |
| Israel | | O | Yes | Yes | Yes | Yes | Yes | |
| Jordan | | | | | Yes | | | |
| Kazakhstan | Yes | Yes | Yes | Yes | Yes | Yes | Yes | Yes |
| Kuwait | Yes | Yes | Yes | Yes | Yes | | Yes | |
| Kyrgyzstan | Yes | Yes | Yes | Yes | Yes | Yes | Yes | Yes |
| Laos | | | Yes | Yes | Yes | Yes | Yes | Yes |
| Mali | | | | | Yes | Yes | Yes | Yes |
| Mongolia | Yes | Yes | Yes | Yes | Yes | | Yes | Yes |
| Morocco | | | Yes | Yes | Yes | | | |
| Mozambique | | | | | | Yes | | Yes |
| Myanmar | O | O | | Yes | Yes | Yes | Yes | Yes |
| Namibia | | O | | | | Yes | | |
| Netherlands | | | O | | | | | |
| Nicaragua | Yes | Yes | Yes | | | | | Yes |
| North Korea | | | O | | | | | |
| Pakistan | Yes | | | Yes | Yes | Yes | | |
| Palestine | | | | | | Yes | | Yes |
| Peru | | | | | | | Yes | |
| Philippines | | | | Yes | | | | |
| Qatar | | | | O | | Yes | Yes | |
| Republic of Congo | | | | | Yes | Yes | Yes | Yes |
| Rwanda | | | | | | | | Yes |
| Saudi Arabia | | O | | | | | Yes | |
| Serbia | Yes | Yes | Yes | Yes | Yes | Yes | Yes | |
| Slovenia | | | | | O | | | |
| South Africa | | | Yes | Yes | Yes | Yes | | |
| South Korea | O | | | | | | | |
| South Ossetia | | | | | | Yes | Yes | Yes |
| Sri Lanka | | | | | Yes | | | |
| Sudan | | | | Yes | Yes | Yes | | Yes |
| Switzerland | | | O | | | | | |
| Syria | | | Yes | Yes | Yes | | Yes | Yes |
| Tajikistan | Yes | Yes | Yes | Yes | Yes | Yes | Yes | Yes |
| Thailand | | | Yes | | | | | |
| Turkey | | | | | O | | | |
| Turkmenistan | O | | | | | | | |
| Uganda | | | Yes | Yes | Yes | | | |
| United States | | | O | | O | | | |
| Uzbekistan | | | Yes | Yes | Yes | Yes | Yes | Yes |
| Venezuela | Yes | Yes | Yes | Yes | Yes | | Yes | Yes |
| Vietnam | O | | | Yes | Yes | Yes | Yes | Yes |
| Yemen | | | | | | Yes | | |
| Zimbabwe | | Yes | Yes | Yes | Yes | | Yes | Yes |

Greece was the only NATO member state that has officially participated in the games. Since 2020, three largely-unrecognised countries have participated.

== Russian groups in opening and closing ceremonies ==
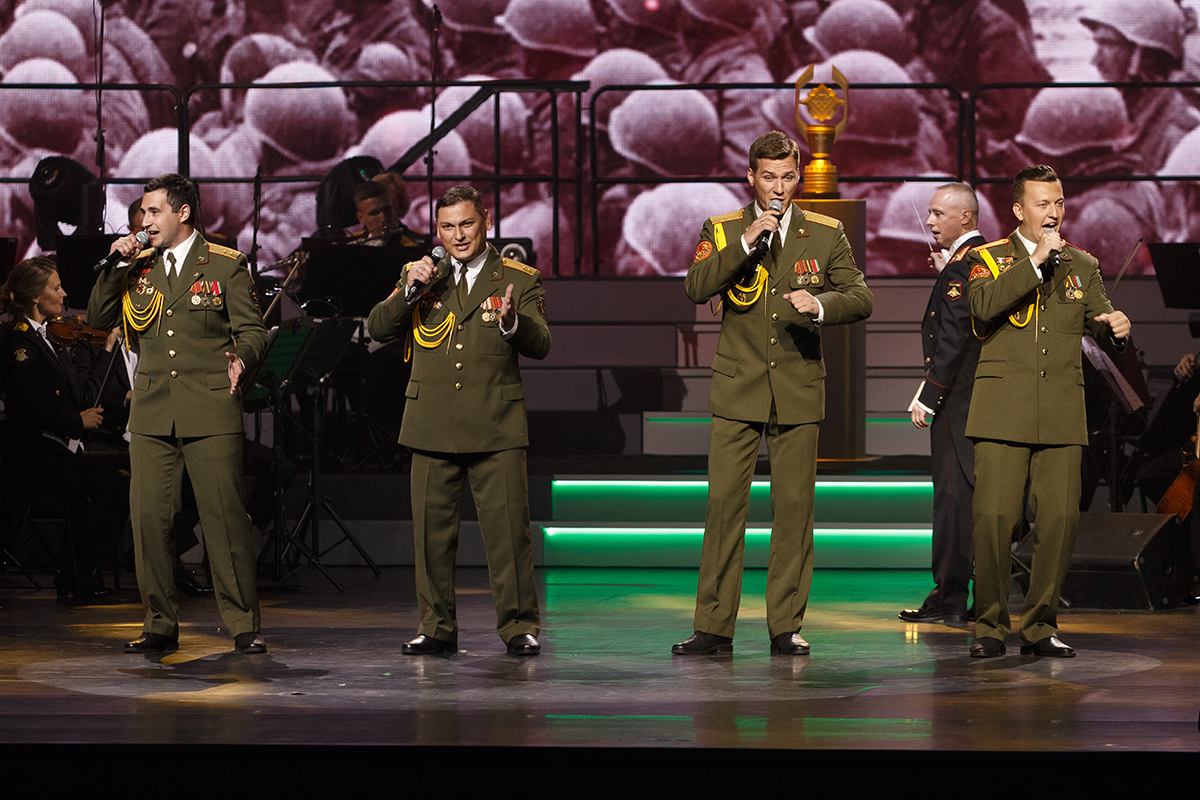
Members of the ensemble during the closing ceremony of the International Army Games in 2020.

- Alexandrov Ensemble
- Central Military Band of the Ministry of Defense of Russia
- 154th Preobrazhensky Independent Commandant's Regiment
- Belarusian Armed Forces Academic Song and Dance Ensemble

== Gallery ==
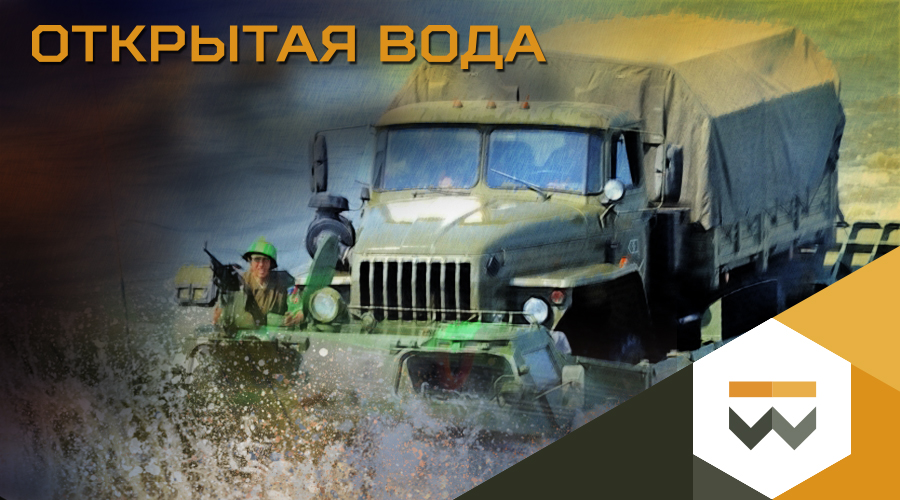

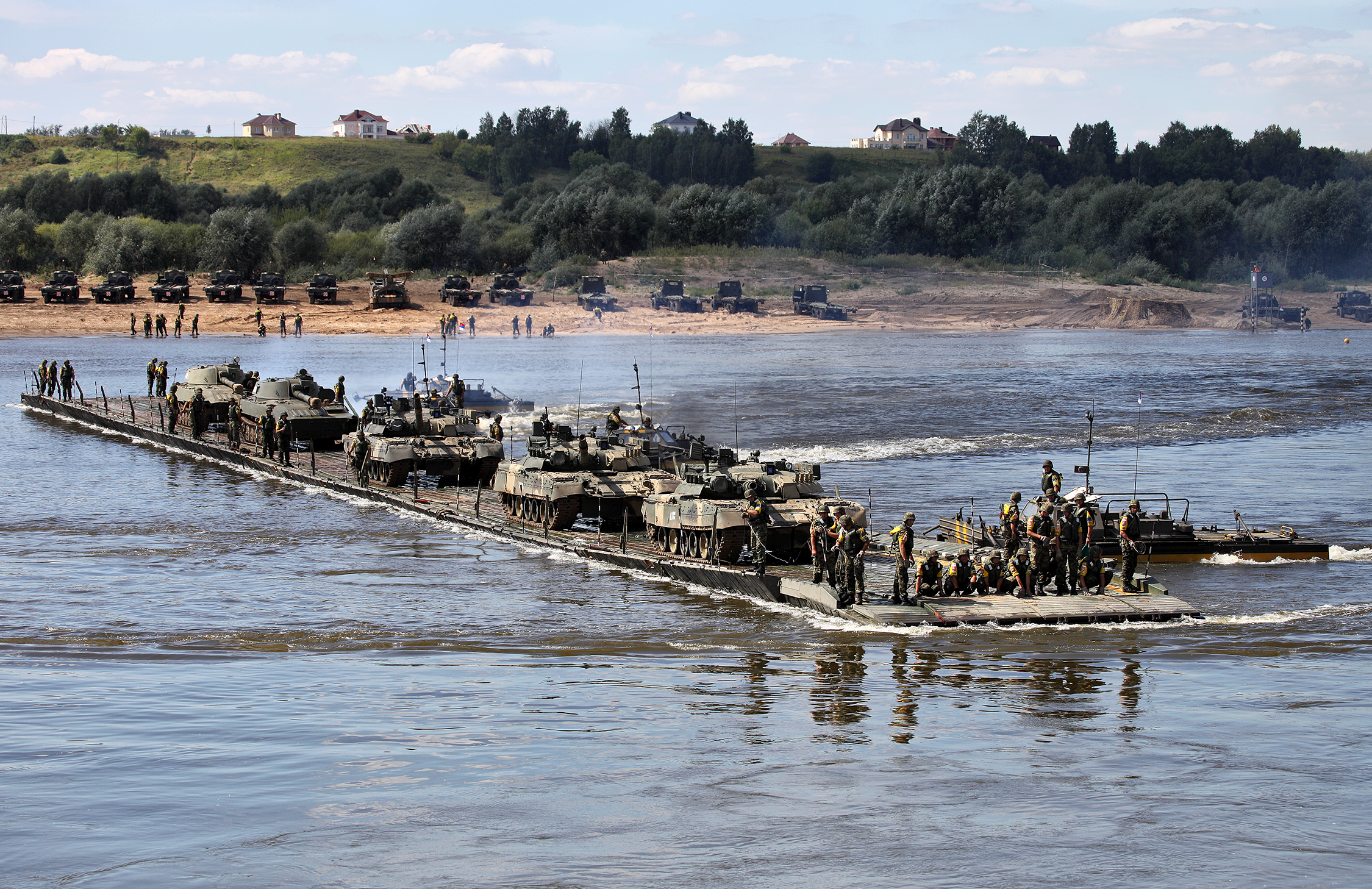

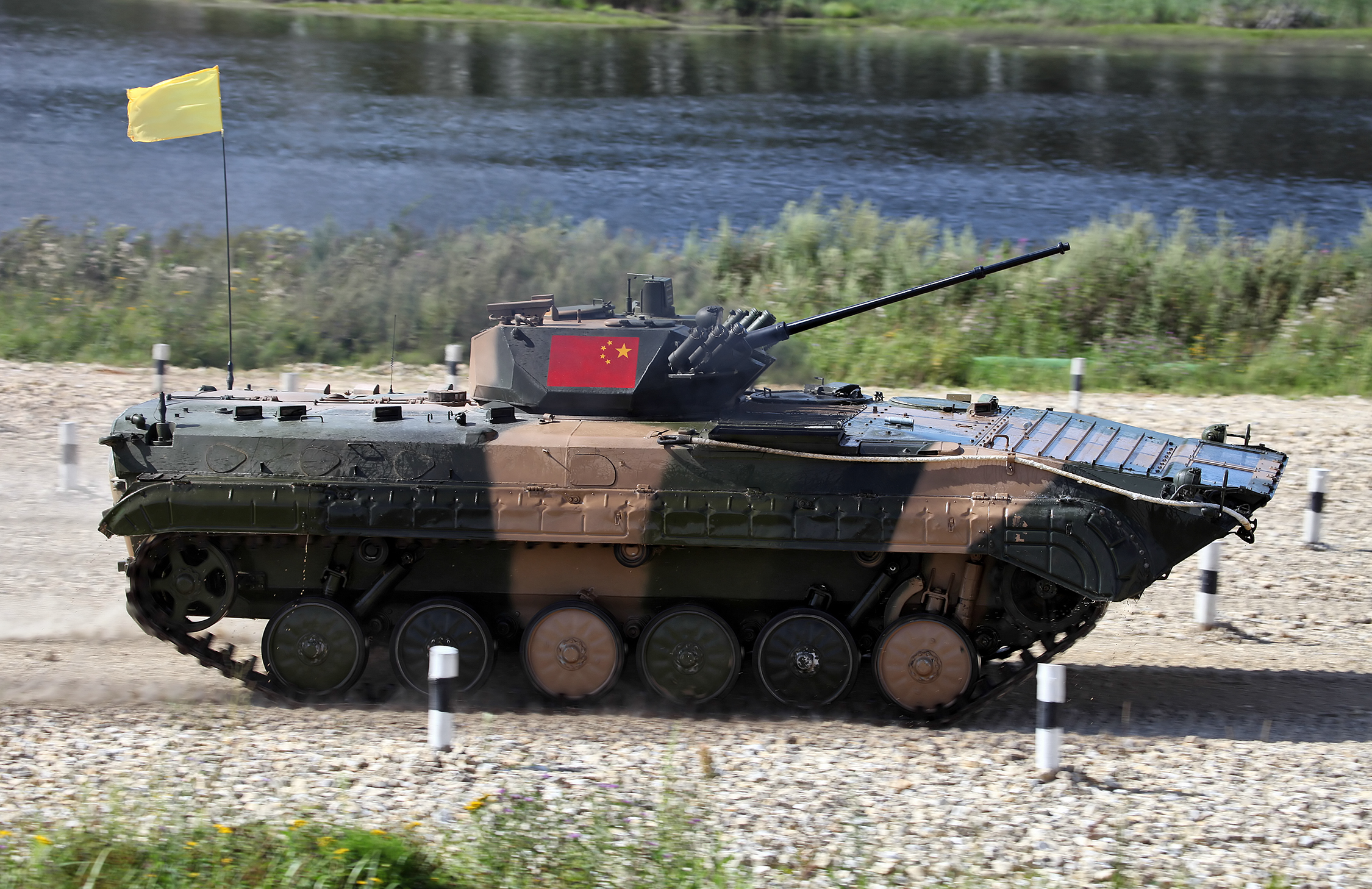

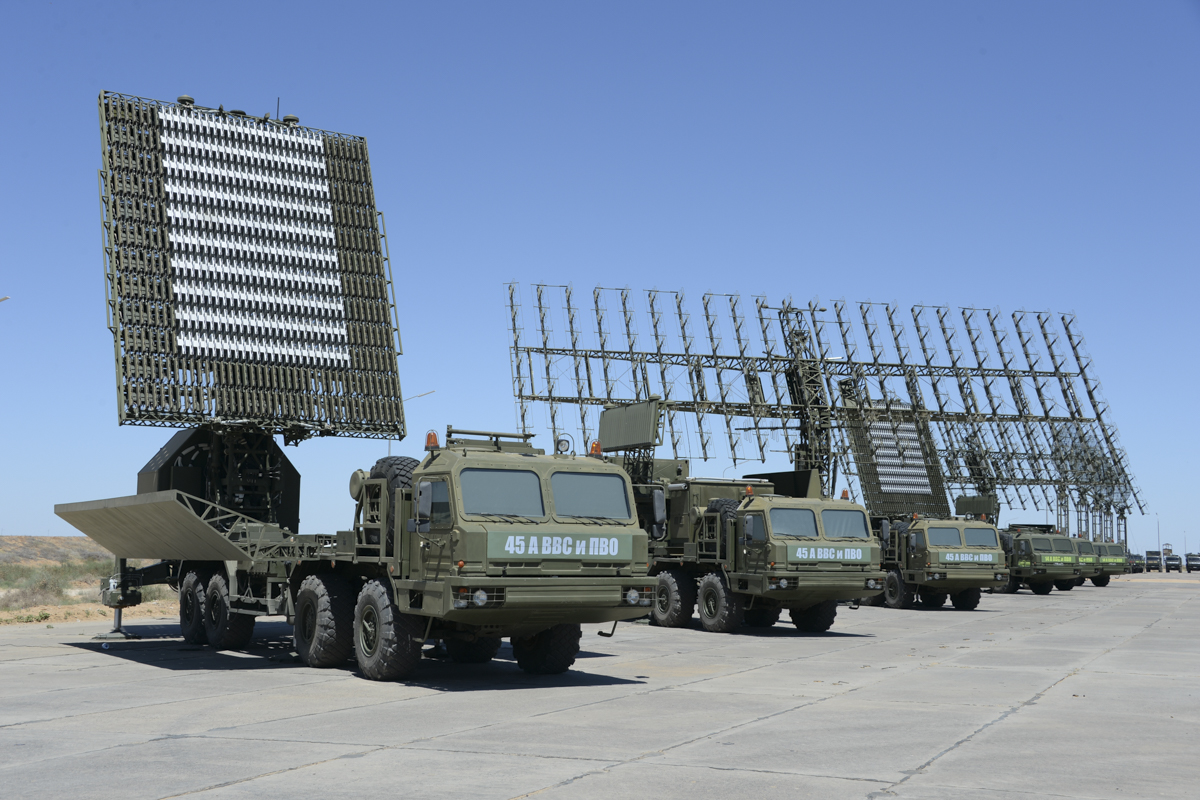

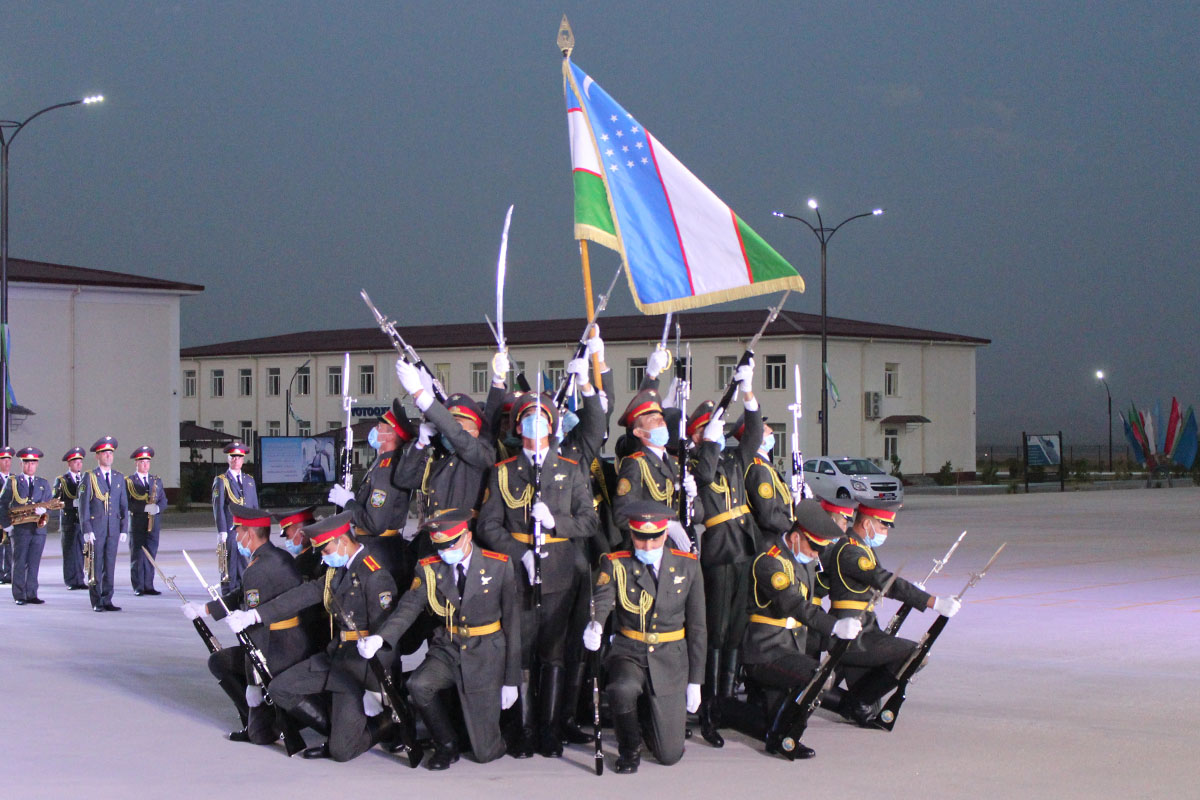

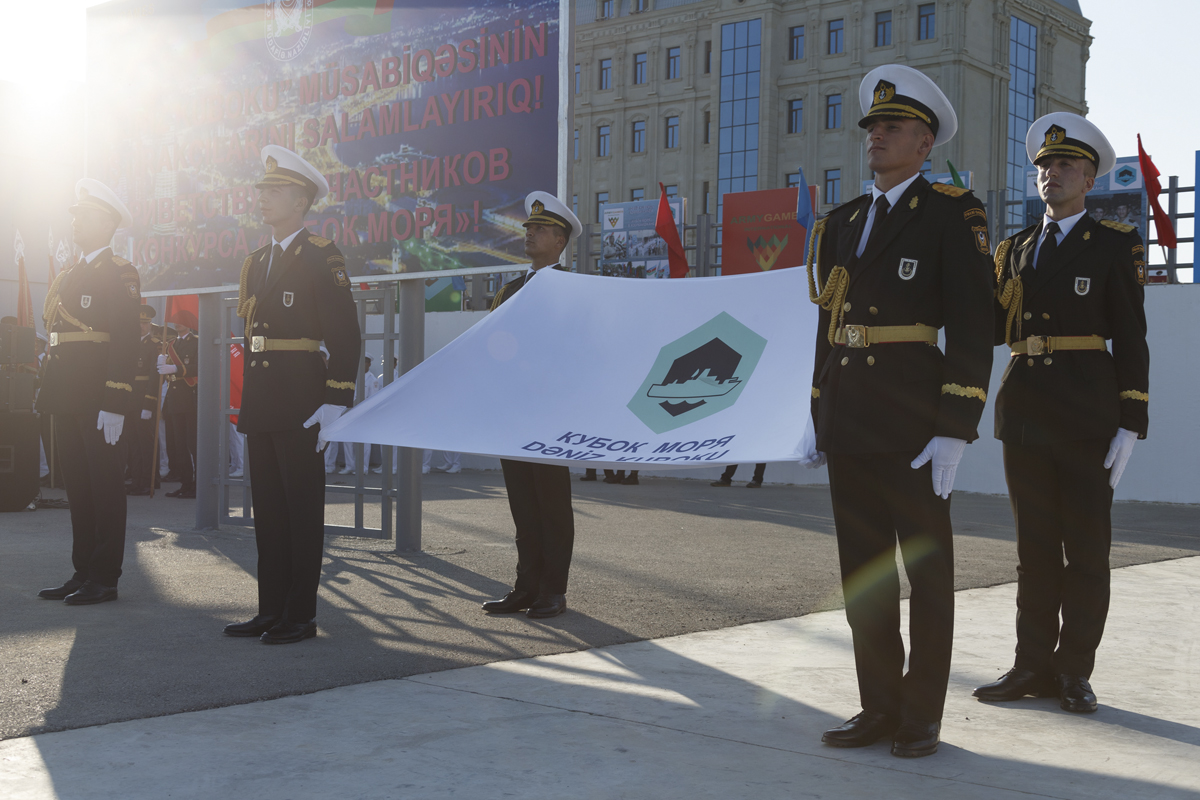

== See also ==
- World Military Championships
- World Military Cup
- Africa Military Games
- Invictus Games
- Military World Games
- World Police and Fire Games
- Exercise RIMPAC
