= Belarusian Transport Troops =

Service branch of the Armed Forces of Belarus

- Транспартныя войскі Узброеных сіл Рэспублікі Беларусь; Транспортные войска Вооружённых сил Республики Беларусь
- Shoulder Patch of the Belarusian Transport Troops
- Founded: 11 May 2006
- Country: Belarus
- Branch: Armed Forces of Belarus
- Type: Mobile Force; Railway troops
- Role: Troop transport
- Part of: Defence Ministry of Belarus
- Headquarters: Minsk
- Beret Color: Green

Commanders
- Commander-in-chief: Alexander Lukashenko
- Head of the Transport Support Department: Colonel Yury Shaplavsky

The Belarusian Transport Troops is a service branch of the Armed Forces of Belarus. It is responsible for the movement of personnel and material by truck, rail, and air, and is designed to carry the tasks of the transport support of the military formations from other service branches across the country.

The general leadership of the branch is exercised by the Minister of Defense, while direct control is carried out by the Head of the Transport Support Department, a position that reports directly to the President of Belarus.

== History ==
By the Decree of the Council of Ministers of the Republic of Belarus on September 20, 1991, the Soviet railway troops stationed in the territory of the newly established Republic of Belarus are put under government control. On December 18, 1992, the railway troops were officially created, forming the basis of the 30th Separate Railway Brigade.

In November 2001, the Department of Railway Forces was reorganized to be put under the command of the Defence Ministry of Belarus.

On May 11, 2006, President Alexander Lukashenko, who is commander-in-chief of the armed forces, signed Decree No. 312 “On some measures to improve the transport support of the Armed Forces, other troops and military formations of the Republic of Belarus”.

At the time this decree was adopted, it created a unified transport support system for the entire armed forces that operated independently from the Belarusian Ground Forces.

== Mandate ==
In peacetime, the transportation troops stands ready to mobilize operational equipment across Belarusian territory. It implements preparatory technical measures such as the restoration/improvement of railways and highways.

In wartime, it fights alongside the rest of the armed forces by providing technical cover, creating lines of communication, and making transport to combat zones much smoother. It is also responsible for the organization of military transport by rail, road and air, specifically by maintaining the implementation of military transport by road.

== Organizational structure ==
- 36th Road and Bridge Brigade (Lapichi/Osipovichi)
- 2123rd Storage Base
- 302nd Separate Railway Brigade (Slutsk)
  - 71st Railway Battalion
  - 259th Mobile Restoration Railway Battalion
  - Railway Troops Junior Specialists School
- 30th Separate Red Banner Railway Brigade (Zhodino)
  - 77th Separate Red Banner Pavement Railway Battalion
  - 74th Pavement Railway Battalion
  - 174th Mechanized Railway Battalion
  - 212th Repair Railway Battalion
- 28th Railway Brigade (Zhlobin)
- 899th Logistics Base

== See also ==
Similar units in other countries

- Railway Troops (Russian Army)
- Transportation Corps (United States Army)
- People's Liberation Army Joint Logistics Support Force
