= Special Operations Forces (Belarus) =

Special Operations Forces of Belarus
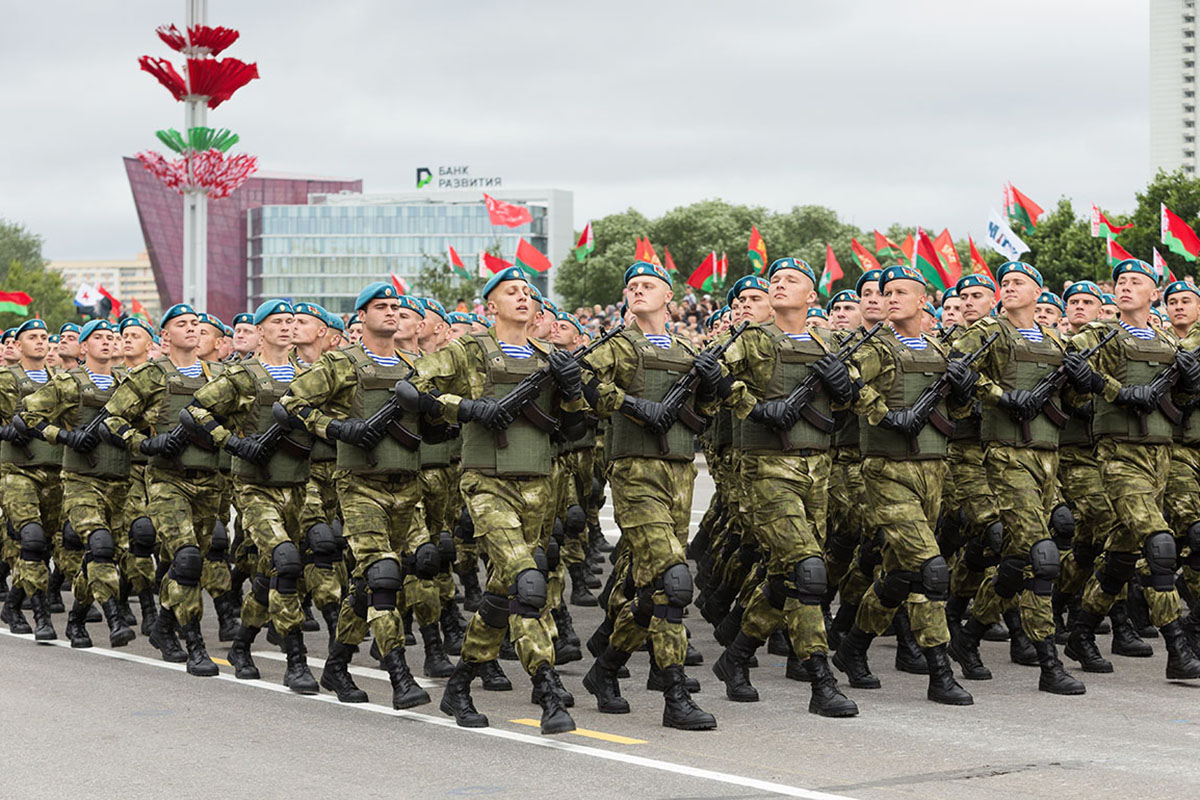
- Belarusian Special Forces during a military parade on Victors Avenue, Minsk.
- Active: 2007–present
- Country: Belarus
- Type: Special forces Airmobile
- Size: 6,150
- Part of: Armed Forces of Belarus
- Nickname: "Winged Infantry"
- Mottos: Nobody but us (Belarusian: Ніхто, акрамя нас!); Anywhere, anytime, any task (alternative) "Suddenness, strength, speed" (Belarusian: Раптоўнасць, сіла, шпаркасць, 1995-2007)
- Anniversaries: 2 August — Paratroopers' Day
- Engagements: United Nations Interim Force in Lebanon; First Libyan Civil War; 2020 Belarusian protests

Commanders
- Current commander: Major General Vadim Denisenko
- Notable commanders: Major General Oleg Belokonev

Insignia
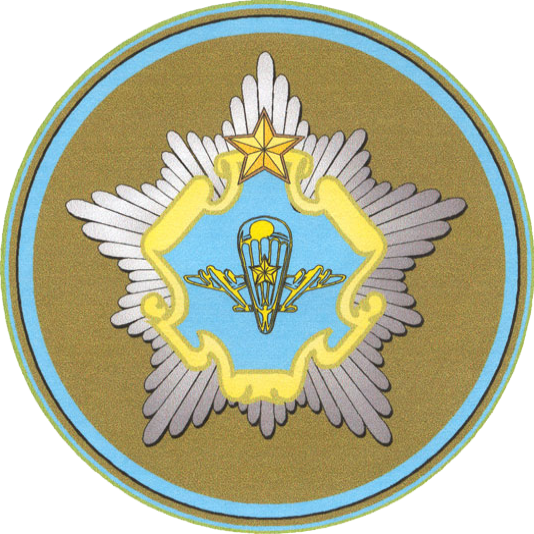
- Emblem

- Flag

The Special Operations Forces of Belarus (Note: Russian: Силы специальных операций Вооружённых сил Республики Беларусь; Belarusian: Cілы спецыяльных аперацый Узброеных Сіл Рэспублікі Беларусь) (SSO) is a service branch of the Armed Forces of Belarus. Like many post-Soviet states, Belarus inherited its special forces units from the remnants of the Soviet armed forces, GRU and KGB units. The units of the Belarusian SSO, which include two airborne brigades and one Spetsnaz brigade, are the only fully manned ground combat units in the Armed Forces of Belarus.

Belarus's units conduct joint exercises with the Armed Forces of Russia in which the nation's special forces participate extensively. Belarus's ruling party has been accused of using its special forces to assassinate opposition leaders. Functionally, the Belarusian SSO are not equivalent to special forces in the conventional sense but rather an inferior counterpart of the Russian Airborne Forces, which they are highly integrated with through relationships established during joint training exercises.

During the 2020 protests, the 5th Spetsnaz Brigade participated in the suppression of the protests, killing one man in Brest. The 38th Guards Air Assault Brigade, while not engaging with protestors, due to its role as a Military Unit, not a Special Forces Unit, moved towards the borders of Belarus, via the order of Belarusian President Alexander Lukashenko.

== History ==
=== Early years ===
In the early 1990s, the military and political leadership of Belarus faced the question of the further fate of the legacy of the Soviet Army. The Belorussian Military District had three airborne units: the 103rd Guards Airborne Division in Vitebsk, the 38th Separate Guards Airborne Brigade in Brest and the 5th Spetsnaz Brigade in Maryina Gorka. A dilemma came when a defense doctrine was proclaimed, of which airborne units did not fit very well.

=== The Mobile Forces ===
Some leaders, proceeding from supposedly pacifist considerations, proposed a radical solution dismantling the airborne forces. In September 1995, mobile forces were formed on the basis of the 103rd Guards Airborne Division and the 38th Separate Guards Airborne Brigade as part of the 38th, 317th and 350th separate mobile brigades.

They took part in the following operational tactical exercises: "Neman" (2001), "Berezina" (2002), "Clear Sky" (2003), "Shield of the Fatherland" (2004), and "Shield of the Union" (2006).

In the early 2000s, mobile brigades were subordinated to the General Staff, and a special operations forces department was created within the operational directorate, which increased the level of organized command and control of mobile special forces units and subdivisions.

=== Modern SOF ===
On 2 August 2007, the formation of the Special Operations Forces was announced. They included two mobile forces brigades (38th and 103rd), the 5th separate special-purpose brigade.

The units of the Special Operations Forces are the only Belarusian ground units maintained at full readiness. The IISS estimated its strength at 6,150 in 2022. The 38th and 103rd Brigades received the relatively new Russian-made 2B23 Nona-M1 towed 120 mm mortar in 2017, of which they fielded a total of eighteen by 2022.

In August 2020, Special Forces participated in the suppression of the protests in Belarus. On August 11, Hienadz Shutau was shot in Brest by captain Roman Gavrilov of 5th Spetsnaz Brigade. In 2021, local court considered Gavrilov as a victim, accusing the late Shutau and another protester. At the court session, it was revealed that the use of army officers in civil operation was authorized by SSO commander Major General Vadim Denisenko.

== Composition ==
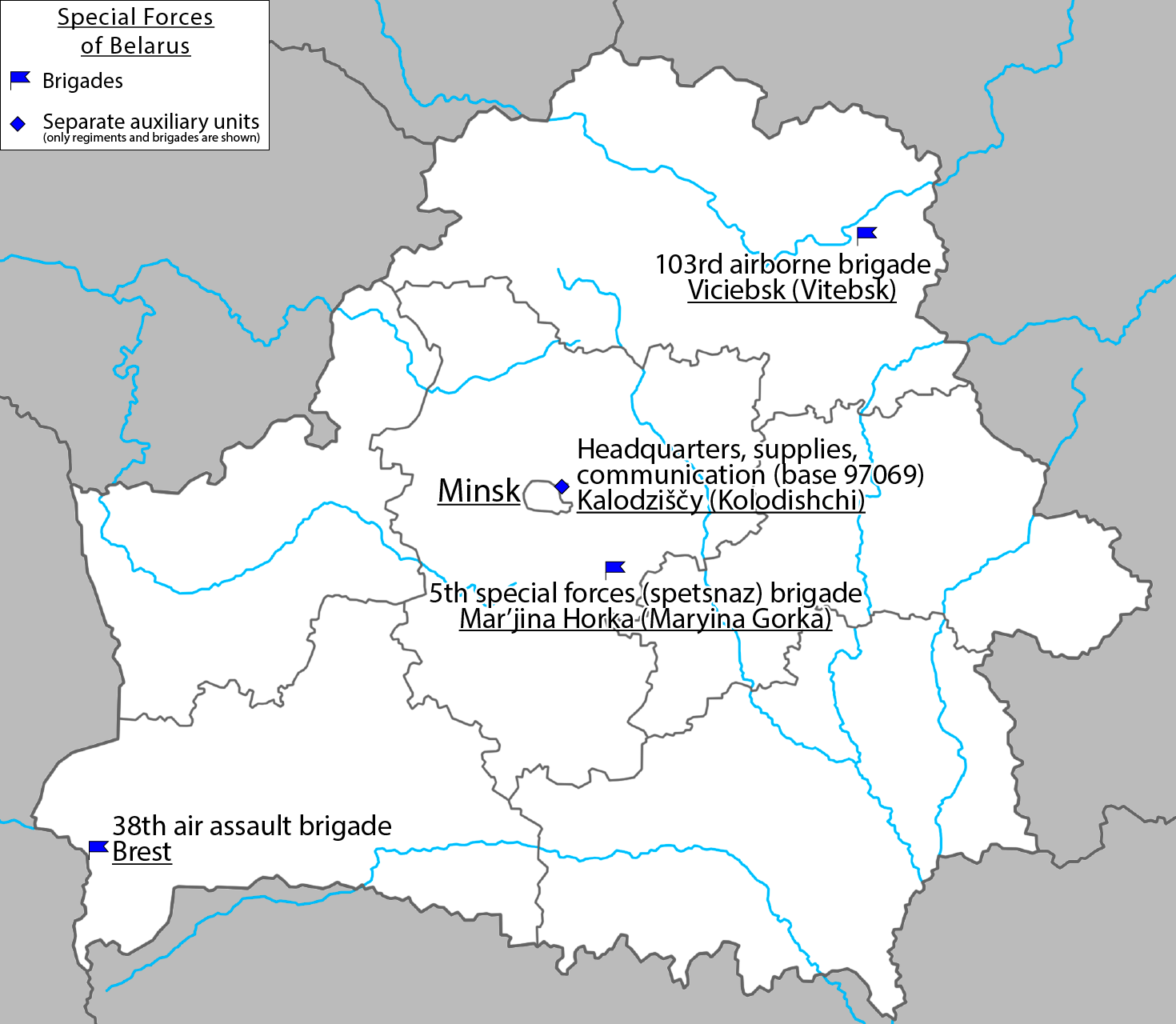
A map showing where Belarusian special forces are based

Army special operations forces include:

- Special Operations Forces Command
- 38th Guards Air Assault Brigade (Brest)
- 103rd Guards Airborne Brigade (Vitebsk)
- 5th Spetsnaz Brigade (Marina Gorka)
- 91st Security and Service Battalion
- 742nd Communications Center

There are units to perform the tasks of particular importance:

- 33rd Guards Spetsnaz Detachment (complete with officers and warrant officers)
- A special purpose detachment of 5th Spetsnaz Brigade (known as "company officer")
- 527th Spetsnaz Company
- 22nd Spetsnaz Company (Western Operational Command)

== Professional training and education ==
Officers for special operations forces are trained by the military intelligence department of the Military Academy of Belarus. Students are trained in the following specialties: management of units and telecommunication systems. Field and practical exercises with the use of weapons and military equipment are held at a field training and material base.

Future special forces officers are trained by following military universities in the Russian Armed Forces: the Novosibirsk Higher Military Command School and the Ryazan Higher Airborne Command School. After five years of training, cadets receive the military rank of Lieutenant.

== Traditions ==
The current Special Operations Forces have most of the same traditions as units of the former Soviet Airborne Forces.

=== Motto ===
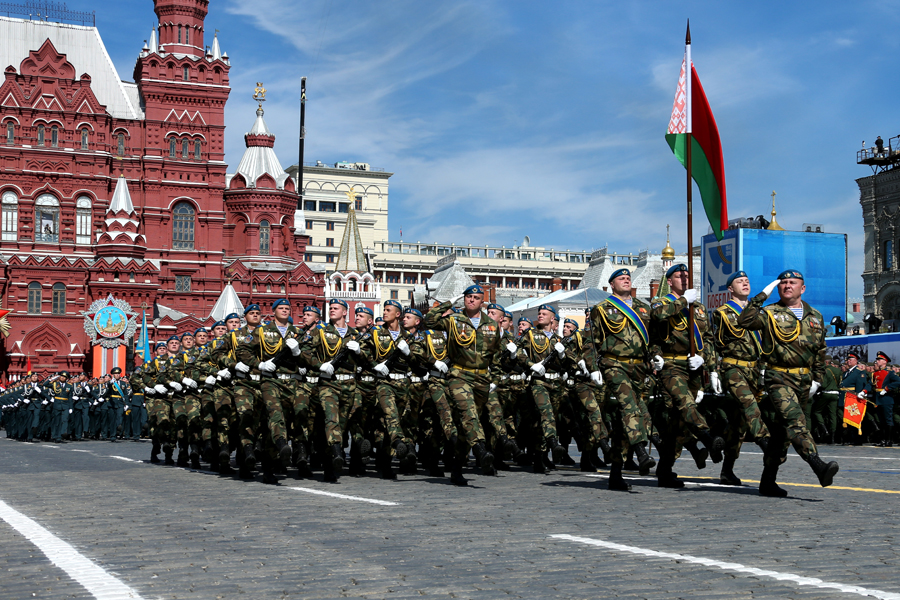
Belarusian Special Forces march during the 2015 Moscow Victory Day Parade on Red Square

The official motto is Nobody but us (Belarusian: Ніхто, акрамя нас!). An alternative motto is also, Anywhere, anytime, any task.

=== Symbols ===
The heraldic badge is the emblem of the Special Forces was approved in March 2012. It consists of the emblem of the special operations forces with a silver ten-pointed star. The flag of the special operations forces is a rectangular cloth of blue color with a green stripe in the lower part. The ratio of the width of the green strip to the width of the flag is 1:3. The flag is 200 cm long and 133 cm wide. In the center of the blue strip of the banner is an image of the heraldic badge.
