= Armed Forces of Belarus =

Combined military forces of Belarus

Armed Forces of the Republic of Belarus
- Узброеныя сілы Рэспублікі Беларусь (Belarusian); Вооружённые силы Республики Беларусь (Russian)
- Emblem of the Belarusian defense ministry

- Flag
- Founded: 1992
- Service branches: Ground Forces; Air Force and Air Defense Forces; Special Operations Forces; Territorial Defense Forces; Transport Forces
- Headquarters: Defense Ministry, Minsk, Belarus
- Website: www.mil.by

Leadership
- President: Alexander Lukashenko
- Minister of Defense: Lieutenant General Viktor Khrenin
- Chief of the General Staff: Major General Vladimir Bely

Personnel
- Conscription: Yes
- Active personnel: 48,600 (2025)
- Reserve personnel: 289,500 (2025)

Expenditure
- Budget: US$1.19 billion (2024)
- Percent of GDP: 2.07% (2024)

Industry
- Domestic suppliers: Belarusian Plant of Precision Electromechanic; Kalashnikov
- Foreign suppliers: Iran; China; Russia; Poland (1991–1995)

Related articles
- History: UNIFIL; First Libyan civil war 2020 Belarusian protests 2022 Kazakh unrest
- Ranks: Military ranks of Belarus

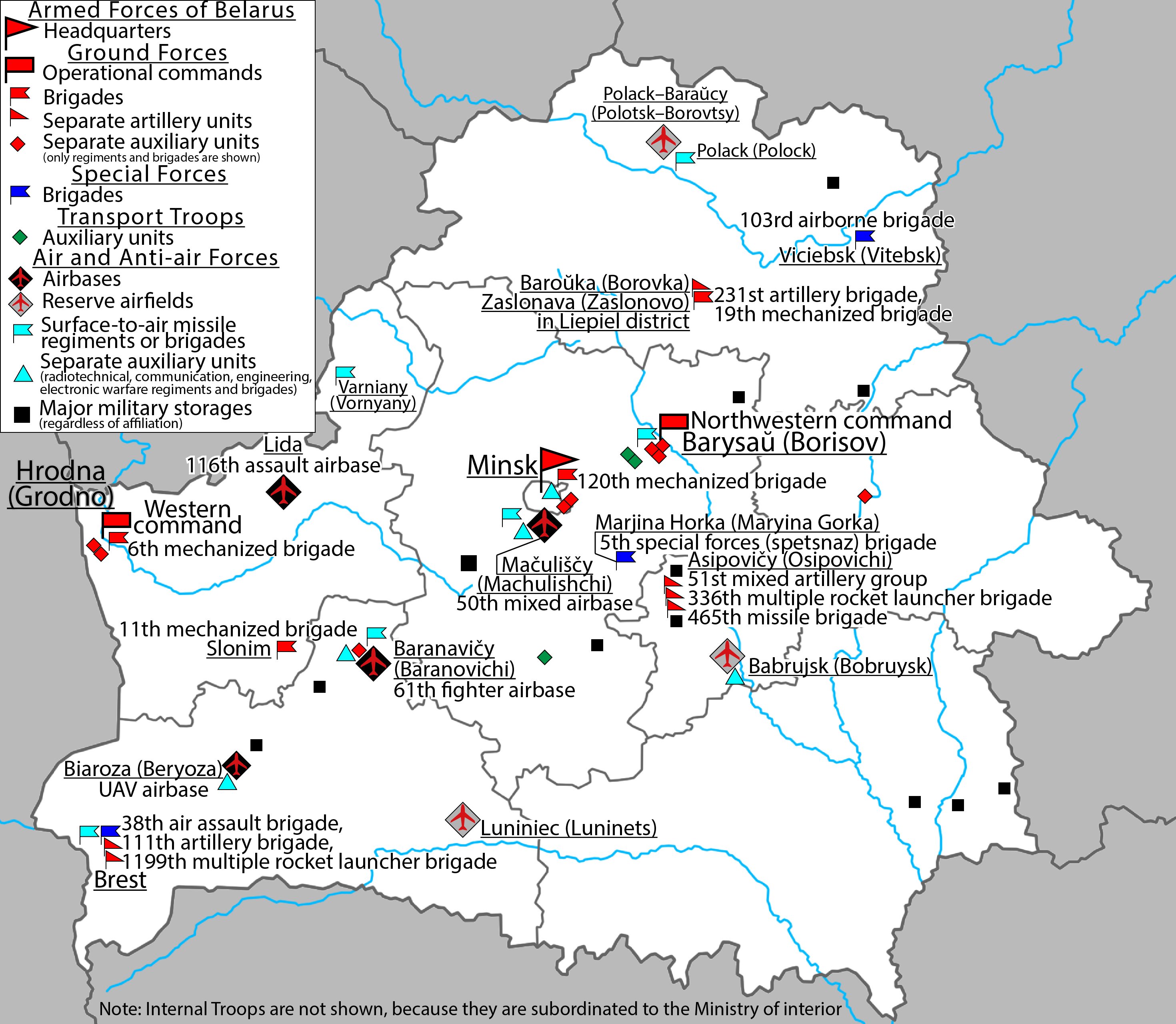
Map showing main military units of the Belarusian Armed Forces Ground Forces Air and Air Defence Forces Special Forces Transport Troops

The Armed Forces of the Republic of Belarus (Note: Belarusian: Узброеныя сілы Рэспублікі Беларусь (УС РБ), romanized: Uzbrojenyja siły Respubliki Biełaruś (US RB); Russian: Вооруженные силы Республики Беларусь, romanized: Vooružennyje sily Respubliki Belarusj) are the military forces of Belarus. They consist of the Ground Forces and the Air Force and Air Defence Forces, all under the command of the Ministry of Defence. As a landlocked country, Belarus has no navy; however, the Belarusian military does have control over some small Soviet inherited naval vessels in its rivers and lakes.

In 2025, IISS estimated that active personnel in the armed forces numbered 48,600, along with 289,500 in the reserve, the population of those who were in the military over the previous five years. Most soldiers are conscripts serving for a period of 18 months, although there is an alternative service option. The Belarusian military still holds many Soviet military laws and holds high numbers of reserve personnel as a high priority.

Belarus conducted military reforms in the early 2000s which reshaped its armed forces as a relatively effective force for a small state in somewhat difficult economic conditions. Since the 2010s the Belarusian military has been more closely integrated with the Russian Armed Forces, with strategic and operational level exercises placing the ground and special forces of Belarus under Russia's 1st Guards Tank Army, and the air force and air defense forces under Russia's 6th Guards Air and Air Defence Forces Army.

== History ==
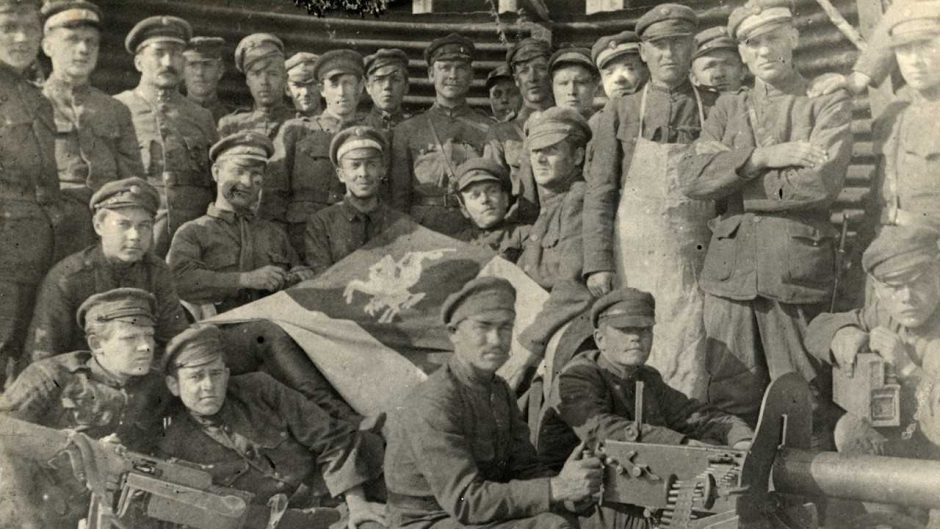
Soldiers of the Belarusian Battalion within the Lithuanian Armed Forces 1919

Former flag of the Armed Forces of Belarus (1995–2012)

The Belarusian People's Republic of March 1918 to April 1919 did not have time to create armed forces in its brief existence, largely due to heavy restrictions imposed on it by the Central Powers during the German occupation of the country, although attempts to create a military have been documented. Military formations of the exiled Belarusian Rada served in Poland, Ukraine, and the Baltics fighting against the Bolsheviks.

Until 1991, the Soviet Belorussian Military District comprised the 5th Guards Tank Army (HQ Bobruisk), the 7th Tank Army (HQ Borisov), the 28th Army (HQ Grodno), the 120th Guards Motor Rifle Division, the 72nd Guards District Training Center and logistical units and formations. Additionally, the Belorussian SSR hosted the 103rd Guards Airborne Division, the 38th Guards Airborne Brigade, the 11th Air Defence Corps of the 2nd Air Defence Army, and the 26th Air Army, as well as units and formations of the Strategic Rocket Forces, Long Range Aviation, the Navy, and special forces.

In late 1991 the 5th Guards Tank Army comprised the 30th Guards Motor Rifle Division, newly arrived from Czechoslovakia, and the 193rd Tank Division, plus two armament and equipment storage bases (the former 8th Guards and 29th Tank Divisions), and army troops. The 7th Tank Army comprised the 3rd Guards Tank Division, 34th, and 37th Guards Tank Divisions, plus army troops. The 28th Army comprised two divisions, the 6th Guards Tank and 50th Guards Motor Rifle, the 6314th Equipment Storage Base at Slonim, and the 5356th Base for Storage of Weapons and Equipment, formerly a low-status mobilisation division. Also arriving from the Southern Group of Forces in Hungary was the 19th Guards Tank Division.

On September 20, 1991, the Supreme Soviet of Belarus passed resolution "On the formation of the Armed Forces of the Republic of Belarus" and on January 11, 1992, resolution "On the Armed Forces deployed in the territory of the Republic of Belarus." On March 18, 1992, the parliament passed resolution "On the Armed Forces of the Republic of Belarus" that bound the government "to start the formation of the Armed Forces of the Republic of Belarus as of March 20, 1992" and "to submit to the Supreme Soviet for approval the suggested structure of the Armed Forces, their size and order of their material and technical supplies".

On May 6, 1992, the Belorussian Military District was abolished. The Belarusian Ministry of Defence and the Main Staff were formed from its resources. The former first deputy commander and military district Chief of Staff, Lieutenant-General Pavel Kozlovskiy, was appointed Minister of Defence on 22 April 1992, taking over from acting Minister of Defence Colonel-General Petr Chaus. On 8 September 1992, the Minsk Higher Military Engineering School and the Minsk Higher Military Command School (now the unified Military Academy of Belarus) were the first to take the military oath of allegiance to the armed forces, with their induction ceremony being held on Independence Square in the presence of defense minister Kozlovskii. This was done to commemorate anniversary of the Lithuanian-Polish victory at the Battle of Orsha, which was considered to be a Day of Belarusian Military Glory.

On August 17, 1992, personnel from the United States Department of Defense made a Conventional Forces in Europe Treaty inspection of an installation in Urechye (near Minsk). The 969th Central Base for Reserve Tanks, and two elements of the 30th Guards Motor Rifle Division: the 30th Guards Tank Regiment and the 20th independent Reconnaissance Battalion were the three units at the site.

On November 3, 1992, Belarus passed the law "On the Armed Forces of the Republic of Belarus" defining the status, structure and guiding principles of the Armed Forces. After the introduction of presidency the law was amended twice: on September 4, 1996, and on November 9, 1999, but on the whole the law retains its initial contents.

On January 1, 1993, all service personnel on Belarusian soil were required to either take an oath of loyalty to Belarus, or leave. This oath however did not alleviate concerns regarding loyalty to Russia in time of crisis, especially since nearly 50% of all military personnel were ethnically Russian in the end of 1992.

In June 1995, President Alexander Lukashenko issued a decree on the Mobile Forces. By June 1996, they comprised a headquarters in Vitebsk, two brigades drawn from the 103rd Guards Airborne Division, the 38th Independent Mobile Brigade (Brest, Belarus), an air transport regiment, and communications, logistics, and engineer units.

Membership in the Commonwealth of Independent States, as well as the 1996 treaty on the Union of Russia and Belarus and the Treaty of the Formation of a Union State in 1999, confirmed a close partnership with Russia. Much of the air defence system was integrated into the Russian air defence network, and in 2006 the two nations signed an agreement on the creation of a unified air defence system.

== Structure ==
Belarus government websites say that the Ministry of Defence of the Republic of Belarus is supported by Central Command Support Elements and the General Staff of the Armed Forces. Combat Support Elements of the Armed Forces included Reconnaissance, Electronic Warfare, Signals, Engineer, NBC Defence, Navigation and Topography, and Maintenance organisations. Logistic Elements of the Armed Forces provided Material Support, Logistic Support, Medical Support, Veterinarian Support, and Military Construction.

In 1995 the Military Academy of Belarus was set up on the basis of two military educational institutions – the Minsk Air Defence and Rocket School of the Soviet Air Defence Forces and the Minsk Higher Military Command School. Its 10 departments train officers of 38 specialties for practically all arms of service. Also in 1995 it was given the status of a government institution of secondary special military education for young men.

=== Branches ===
==== Ground Forces ====
Combat brigades of Belarus

A Library of Congress study of national ground forces said that in 1994 Belarus had ground forces of 52,500. They were organized into three corps headquarters, two motor divisions, one airborne division, the 51st Guards Artillery Division at Osipovichi, three mechanized divisions, one airborne brigade, three surface-to-surface missile brigades, two antitank brigades, one special duties brigade, and seven anti-aircraft missile brigades. Equipment included 3,108 main battle tanks (seventy-nine T-54, 639 T-55, 291 T-62, 299 T-64, eight T-80, and 1,800 T-72), 419 medium-range launchers, sixty surface to-surface missiles, and 350 surface-to-air missiles.

In 1993 the 7th Tank Army was reorganised as the 7th Army Corps. In 1994 the 7th Army Corps was redesignated as the 65th Army Corps, still located at Borisov.

By January 1, 1995, the composition of the Belarusian ground forces had changed. The Library of Congress study estimated at the time that Ministry of Defence forces included the 103rd Guards Airborne Division and the 38th Separate Assault-Landing Brigade; the 28th Army Corps (Grodno Region and Brest Region), composed of headquarters at Grodno, the 6th Guards Kiev-Berlin Mechanised Brigade, the 11th Guards Mechanised Brigade, the 50th Separate Mechanised Infantry Brigade, the Armament and Equipment base, and corps units (missile troops, antiaircraft, chemical and engineer troops, signals, and rear services); the 65th Army Corps (Minsk and Vitebsk Regions), composed of headquarters at Borisov, three armament and equipment bases, and corps units; and the 5th Guards Army Corps (Minsk and Mahilyow regions) made up of headquarters at Babruysk, the 30th Separate Motor Rifle Brigade, two Armament and Equipment bases, and corps units.

Actually, the 103rd Guards Airborne Division had been reorganized as Headquarters, Mobile Forces, in 1993. On 1 August 1996 the 51st Guards Artillery Division was reorganised as the 51st Guards Central Group of Artillery, still located at Osipovichi.

On 21 December 2001, a major reorganisation of the Ground Forces produced two operational-territorial commands, formed from two former corps headquarters. All Belarus ground forces were now grouped within these two commands, the Western Operational Command at Grodno, former from the previous 28th Army Corps, the former Soviet 28th Army, and the North Western Operational Command, the former 65th Army Corps, at Barysaw (Borisov).

Since about 2001, territorial defence forces, which as of 2002 number around 150,000, have been forming, organised into battalions, companies, and platoons spread across Belarus.

In 2007, the Land Forces consisted of 29,600 soldiers (6th Guards Mechanised Brigade (Grodno), 11th Guards Mechanized Brigade at Slonim, the 120th Guards Mechanised Brigade (Minsk), 38th and 103rd Mobile Brigades (organized similarly to Soviet airborne regiments, not all of them are equipped with BMD-1)), 5th Spetsnaz Brigade (Maryina Horka), five artillery brigades and four regiments, two MRL regiments, 15th, 29th, 115th, 120th and 302nd SAM Brigades, two SSM brigades, two brigades and one regiment of engineers, 8th independent NBC Brigade, two signals brigades, 40th independent NBC battalion. Army equipment includes 1800 main battle tanks (MBT) and 2600 AFV/APC. The weapons and equipment storage bases include the 50th (Brest), 19th, 34th & 37th (former tank divisions), 3rd, and 28th (Baranovichi). Weapons storage bases that have been disbanded include the 29th, 30th, 193rd, and the storage base that used to be the 8th Guards Tank Division at Marina Gorka.

In 2012 it was reported that there were six mechanised brigades in the Ground Forces: three full-strength, the 6th (Grodno), 11th (Slonim), and 120th Guards Mechanised Brigade at Minsk. The others were at reduced strength, where there was one battalion, the 19th (Zaslonova), 37th, and 50th (Baranovichi). By 2017, the number of mechanised brigades had been further reduced to four, with two at full strength and two at reduced strength.

==== Air Force and Air Defence Forces ====
The 28th Fighter Aviation Regiment, 2nd Air Defence Corps, Moscow Air Defence District was stationed in Krichev in Mogilev Oblast, and disbanded in 1993.

In 2007 the Air Force and Air Defence Force of Belarus (AF & ADF) consisted of 18,170 personnel (two fighter/interceptor bases, four FGA/reconnaissance squadrons, one transport air base, training aircraft, and attack and support helicopters, SAM units). Air Force equipment included in 2004 260 fighter-ground attack/training aircraft and 80 attack helicopters. According to Belarus government websites, the Air Forces now have two commands, the Western Operational-Tactical Command and the North-Western Operational-Tactical Command.

The 61st and 927th Air Bases have now merged into the 61st (fighter) Air Base at Baranovichi, flying MiG-29s, and the 206th Air Base (Ross) has merged into the 116th Guards Assault Air Base at Lida, flying Su-25s.

=== Independent forces ===
==== Special Forces ====
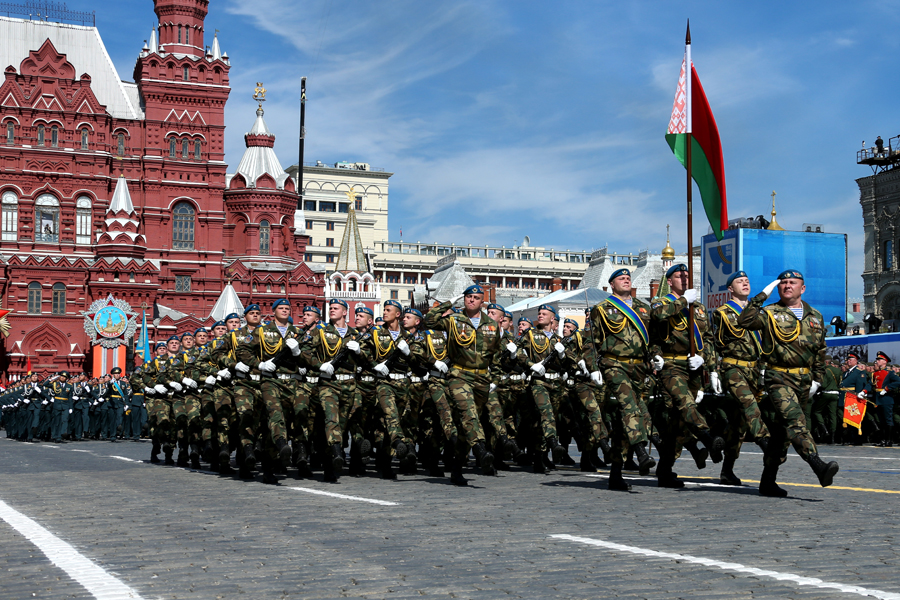
Troops of the Special Forces during the 2015 Moscow Victory Day Parade

The Special Forces of Belarus is the airmobile and strategic deterrence force. It has been a participant in conflicts such as the United Nations Interim Force in Lebanon and the Libyan Civil War (2011).

==== Transport Troops ====
The Belarusian Transport Troops is responsible for the movement of personnel and material by truck, rail, and air. It is also designed to carry the tasks of the transport support of the military formations from other service branches. General leadership is exercised by the Minister of Defense, while direct control is carried out by the Head of the Transport Support Department, a position that reports directly to the President.

==== Territorial Forces ====
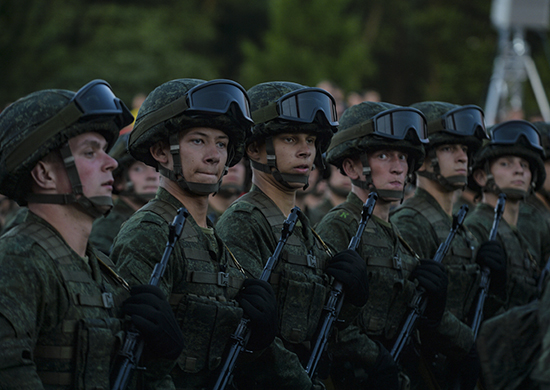
Troops of the Territorial Army of Belarus.

The Territorial Defense Troops of Belarus are a homeland defence organization in the armed forces. It is managed by the Department of the Territorial Forces, being a support department of the Ministry of Defence of Belarus and is operated by the General Staff. It is currently located on Kommunisticheskaya Street in Minsk. The current head of the department of territorial forces is Colonel Andrei Paseko. The Territorial Defence system was established in the early 2000s. Over 120,000 troops constitute the size of the Territorial Forces, which is twice as much as it serves in the regular duty military. During an address by President Alexander Lukashenko on 18 February 2016, he announced the allocation of arms and to the territorial forces and the minimum and maximum amount of district troops ranging from one company and a battalion. Personnel of these units are recruited from residents of their respective administrative-territorial regions.

=== Specialized forces ===
Special troops are designed to support the combat activities of the Ground Forces and solve their inherent tasks. They include formations and military units of intelligence, communications, engineering, radiation, chemical and biological defense, electronic warfare, navigation and topographic.

- Electronic Warfare Troops
- Signal Corps
- Engineer troops
- NBC Protection Troops
- Topographic Navigation Service

In (2021?) the 1393rd Artillery Warehouse for Ammunition celebrated its 80th anniversary. The combat path of the mobile warehouse, formed on June 25, 1941 in the city of Mozhaisk, passed through the Moscow and Kaliningrad regions, Lithuania and East Prussia. In May 1945, the 1393rd Field Front-Line Artillery Depot was transferred to the village of Pribor. Today, the unit repairs, stores, and maintains rocket and artillery weapons.

== Security forces ==
=== Internal Troops ===
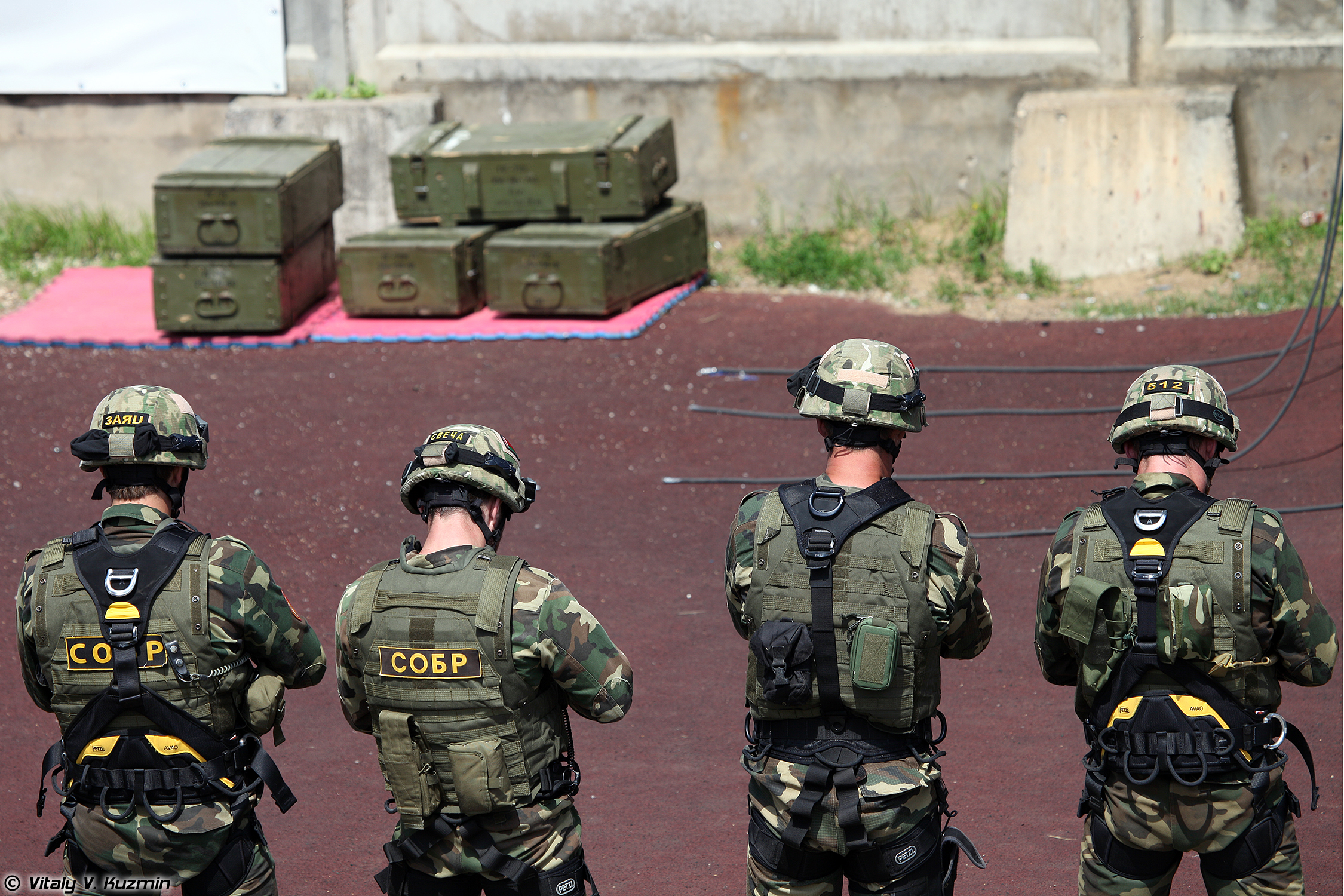
The Special Purpose Unit of the Internal Troops.

The Internal Troops of Belarus were formed from the former Soviet Internal Troops after the collapse of the Soviet Union. They consist of three independent brigades and seven independent battalions (consecutively numbered).

=== Border Guard Service ===
The Border Guard Service is the paramilitary force of the State Border Committee of the Republic of Belarus. It covers the borders with Russia, Ukraine, Poland, Lithuania and Latvia.

== Manpower ==
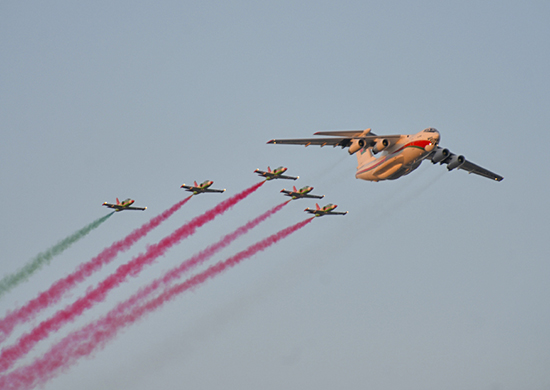
Belarusian jets during a flyby in Minsk, July 2019.

The Government Directive of 20 March 1992 'On the Establishment of the Armed Forces of the Republic of Belarus' founded the Belarusian army. The Soviet troops of the BMD were smoothly converted into Belarusian military units. Yet one of the first tasks of the Belarusian government was a reduction in its numbers. 240,000 soldiers and officers were serving in the Belarusian Military District. By early 2013 the numbers of military personnel had been scaled down nearly fourfold since 1991. In February 2014, Belorusskaya Voyennaya Gazeta, the official publication of the Ministry of Defense revealed that the Belarusian Armed Forces contains about 59,500 personnel, including 46,000 soldiers and 13,000 civilians.

== Personnel ==
=== Military Commandant's Services ===
The Military Commandant's Services of the Armed Forces of Belarus are regional administrations tasked with overseeing Belarusian regiments in the commandant's territory. Units are assigned to a specific commandant based on their location. As of 2025, there are 6 military commandant's services in the Belarusian Armed Forces.

| Service Name | Commander | Region |
|---|---|---|
| Baranavichy Military Commandant's Service | Lieutenant Colonel Vladimir Pivovar | Brest region |
| Babruysk Military Commandant's Service | Lieutenant Colonel Vladimir Gritsuk | Mogilev region |
| Barysaw Military Commandant's Service | Lieutenant Colonel Ivan Kislyi | Minsk region |
| Brest Military Commandant's Service | Lieutenant Colonel Yuri Ivanyuk | Brest region |
| Grodno Military Commandant's Service | Lieutenant Colonel Alexander Lupyrev | Grodno region |
| Minsk Military Commandant's Service | Colonel Nikolai Kurash | Minsk region |

Units of commandant's services include military police, honour guards and military bands.

=== Military education ===
- Military Academy of Belarus
- Ministry of the Interior Academy of Belarus
- Border Guard Service Institute of Belarus
- Military Institute of the Belarusian State Medical University
- Military Faculty of the Belarusian State University – The faculty was established on 4 November 1926, by order of the Revolutionary Military Council. In 1941, at the beginning of the Great Patriotic War, military training classes were interrupted only to be resumed in 1943. In the post-war and subsequent years, the military department continued to train reserve officers from among the students in the required military accounting specialties. In 2003, the military department was reorganized into the modern military faculty of Belarusian State University.
- Military Faculty of the Belarusian State University of Informatics and Radioelectronics
- Military Faculty of the Belarusian National Technical University
- Military Faculty of the Grodno State University
- Military Faculty of the Belarusian State University of Transport
- Military Faculty of the Belarusian State Academy of Aviation

== Equipment ==
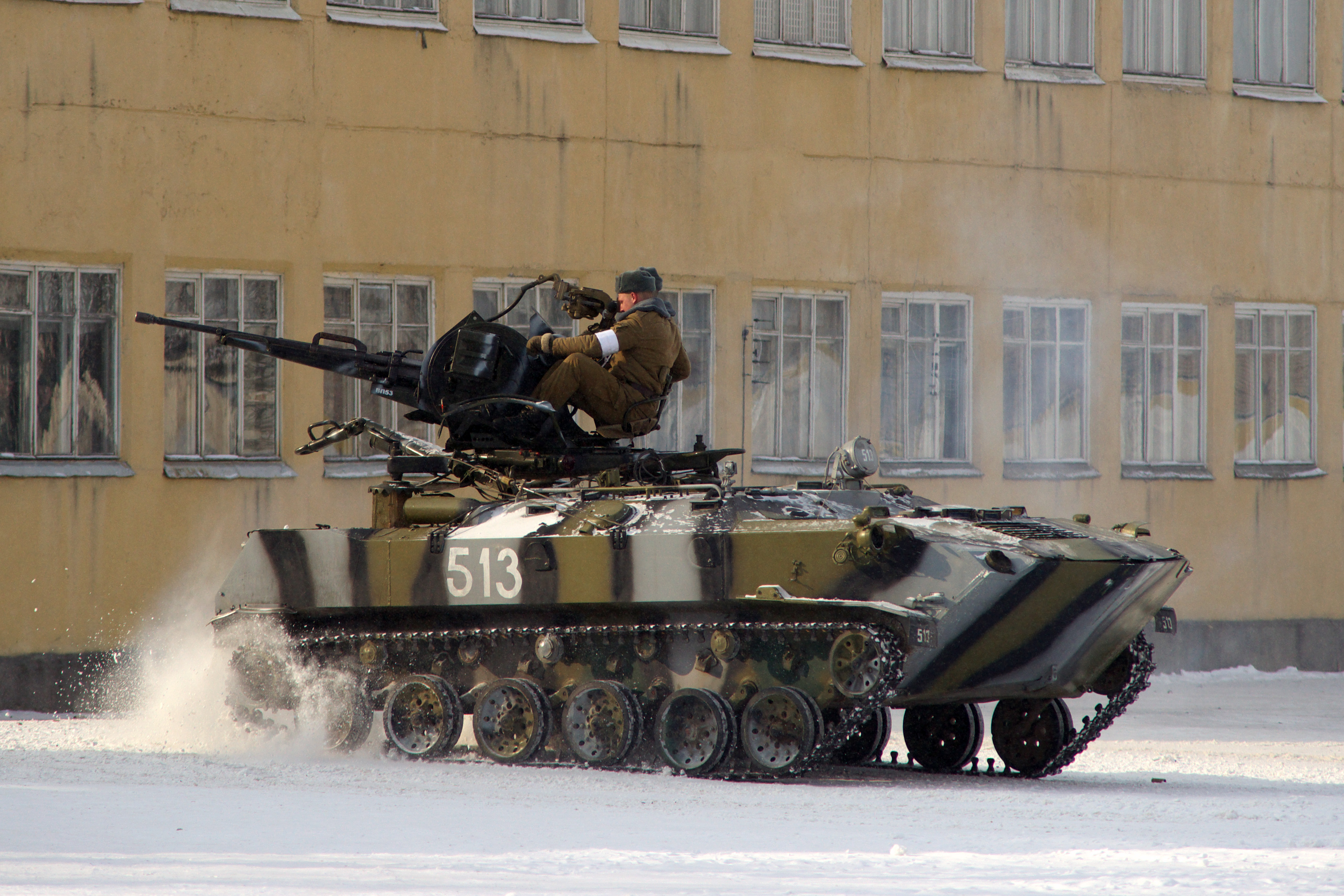
BTR-D

The military forces of Belarus are almost exclusively armed with Soviet-era equipment inherited from the Soviet Union. Although large in numbers, some Western experts consider some of it outdated.

"The Belarusian armed forces receive around 100 brand-new and upgraded systems a year", said in late July 2018, Belarusian Deputy Minister of Defence for Armament and Chief of Armament Major General Sergei Simonenko. The MBTs are of Russian type T-72, T-62, and T-55, the APCs and IFVs are of Russian type MT-LB, BMP-2, BMP-1, and the BMD-1, and Russian type trucks are the GAZ-66 and the KAMAZ-6560. While the IISS Military Balance 2016 listed 69 T-80s in service, by 2018 the listing had been removed, and the only MBTs listed were 527 T-72 as well as 5 T-72B3.

The Air Force is equipped with MiG-29 fighters, Su-25 attack aircraft, as well as Mi-8, Mi-24, and some old, Polish built Mi-2 helicopters. In December 2005, Belarus bought 10 L-39C jet trainer aircraft from Ukraine, and in 2017 a contract have been signed to buy 12 Su-30SM fighters. In 2006, four batteries (divizions in Russian terminology; about six systems each) of S-300 anti-aircraft systems were acquired from Russia to reinforce the Joint CIS Air Defense System. The Military Balance 2018 listed a brigade with the S-300P and a brigade with the S-300V (SA-12A Gladiator/SA-12B Giant). Moscow and Minsk signed contracts in 2021 for the supply of fighters, helicopters, air defense systems and other weapons to Belarus. S-400 air defense systems and 9K720 Iskander tactical ballistic missiles were delivered in 2022. It was also reported that almost every company was equipped with quadcopters. Kamikaze and surveillance UAVs of domestic development and production were reportedly entered service in 2024. The modernized automated portable artillery fire control system "Lector" entered service in 2026. The "Stena" C-UAS system was also adopted for supply in 2026 alongside the "Shafran" laser C-UAS system and two air target detection stations. The Belarusian Minister of Defense Viktor Khrenin said on 6 November 2026 that the Armed Forces of Belarus adopted over 80 types of weapons systems during the year and more than 10,000 samples for operation and training entered service.

== Military cooperation ==
=== CSTO ===
The armed forces took part in a joint CSTO military intervention in Kazakhstan during the 2022 Kazakh unrest.

=== Military advisors ===
The armed forces have sent their military specialists to countries such as Côte d'Ivoire, Venezuela, Libya, Yemen and the Democratic Republic of the Congo, acting both officially and secretly. In Belarus, they have previously trained military personnel from the Nigerian Army. In 2014 and 2015, the special forces of the Nigerian Army were trained on the territory of Belarus, with the Belarusians training the Nigerians in counterterrorism.

In 2007, an agreement was signed in Caracas with Venezuela, according to which Belarusian military specialists for the National Bolivarian Armed Forces of Venezuela were developing a unified air defense and electronic warfare system. The following year, the first ten servicemen went to the country, with Lieutenant-General Oleg Paferov being appointed as the officer responsible for the activities of the advisers. A contingent of about 500 military advisers was also present in Libya during the First Libyan Civil War, supporting the government of Muammar Gaddafi. As of autumn 2013, there were at least two Belarusian advisers in Yemen at the Ministry of Defense. On November 26 of the same year, during an attack on a hotel in Sanaa, a Belarusian was killed and another was wounded. In February 2020, a dozen Belarusian military instructors arrived in Abidjan (Côte d'Ivoire), where they were stationed at the Agban military base, which is occupied by one of the country's national gendarmerie units.

== Institutions and special units of the armed forces ==
=== Museum of Military History of Belarus ===
The Museum of Military History of Belarus (Russian: Музей военной истории Беларуси) is located in the Pyershamayski District of Minsk. It was established as the Museum of the History of the Belarusian Military District, opened in Minsk on February 21, 1978. In July 1993, it was converted into a museum on the military history of Belarus. The exhibits are the same as before the collapse of the USSR, with a small section on the medieval history of the Grand Duchy of Lithuania having since been added. Its collection numbers over 18 thousand exhibits. The most ancient of them date back to the 6th century.

=== Belarusian Union of Officers ===
The Public Association "Belarusian Union of Officers" (hereinafter referred to as BSO) is a public association of officers and warrant officers who are on active duty and in retirement. It was established on 20 September 1992 at its founding congress. On September 18, 1993, Deputy of the Supreme Soviet Alexander Lukashenko took part in the 2nd Congress. From October 2005 to January 2015, the Republican Council of the BSO was headed by retired Lieutenant General E. Mikulchik, and until November 2017 was led by retired Major General V. Bamburov.

=== Other ===
- Military Band Service of the Armed Forces
- Belarusian Armed Forces Academic Song and Dance Ensemble
- Central House of Officers (Minsk)
- Honor Guard of the Armed Forces of Belarus
- Belarusian Great Patriotic War Museum
- Belaya Rus demonstration team

== Military holidays ==
- In Belarus, the holiday annual Defender of the Fatherland Day (known as Дзень абаронцы Айчыны in the Belarusian language) celebrations on 23 February also coincide with the Day of the Armed Forces (Дзень Узброеных Сіл). It commemorates that day 1918 when the first unified military in the country was established as part of the Red Army. Officially declared a public holiday by President Lukashenko on 25 March 2004, it has traditionally been honoured with a wreath laying ceremony by the President of Belarus on Victory Square. Joint festive events with soldiers of the Russian Armed Forces soldiers are also hold on 23 February in connection with their professional holiday. During the centennial of the armed forces in 2018, events were held throughout the year, including a military parade in Gomel and celebrations in Vitebsk.
- Although a national holiday, Independence Day is primarily an armed forces celebration which honours those who took part in the Red Army's 1944 Minsk Offensive. The Minsk Independence Day Parade is the main military event done on this day.

== Combat Banners and military marches ==
The Battle Banner of a military unit is a symbol of the unit, retained throughout its lineage. Changes in the name and numbering of a military unit are entered in the Certificate of the President of the Republic of Belarus, issued upon presentation of the Battle Banner. The Battle Banner is awarded to formations, brigades/regiments, battalions, divisions, air squadrons, training units, and military educational institutions. Guards units are awarded with a black-and-orange guards ribbon attached to its shaft. Upon presentation of the Battle Banner to a military unit, a Diploma of the President of the Republic of Belarus is issued. In the event of the loss of the Battle Banner, the commander of a military unit and its servicemen are subject to legal consequences and the military unit is disbanded.

The following is a list of notable Belarusian military pieces:

- Motherland My Dear (Радзіма мая дарагая)
- Victory March (Марш Перамогi)
- Anthem of the Military Academy (Гимн Военной академии)
- Grenadier March (Марш Грэнадыі)
- Our Fatherland's Flag (Айчыны нашай сцяг)
- Letter from 45 (Письмо из 45-го)

== In art ==
- Viva Belarus! - the most famous film about the political regime of Alexander Lukashenko, human rights in Belarus during his rule and also about the system of Belarusian army.
