= Gennady Mozheyko =

Belarusian journalist and political prisoner

Gennady Nikolayevich Mozheyko
- Генадзь Мікалаевіч Мажэйка
- Born: 11 May 1982 (age 44); Minsk, Soviet Union
- Citizenship: Belarus
- Education: Belarusian State University of Informatics and Radioelectronics
- Occupation: Journalist

Gennady Nikolayevich Mozheyko (Belarusian: Генадзь Мікалаевіч Мажэйка, Russian: Геннадий Николаевич Можейко; born 11 May 1982, in Minsk, USSR) is a Belarusian journalist and political prisoner. On 1 October 2021 he was detained in connection with his professional activities. Belarusian and Russian journalists and human rights activists called for his release. In March 2023 he was sentenced to three years in penal colony.

== Biography ==
Mozheyko was born on 11 May 1982 in Minsk. In 2004 he graduated from the Belarusian State University of Informatics and Radioelectronics. Since 2009 he has been working in the newspaper Komsomolskaya Pravda in Belarus. In 2011, he took second place in the photo contest Belarus Press Photo. He wrote on topics related to transport, technology, history, army and military equipment.

In August 2020, Mozheyko covered the events of the first days of the mass protests that followed the presidential election. On the night of 11–12 August 2020, on the instructions of the editors, he worked in the Serebryanka microdistrict as part of a group of four journalists from Komsomolskaya Pravda. Despite the presence of a vest with the inscription "Press" and a white helmet, he was easily beaten by unknown security forces. Later, he recalled:

Our entire ‘dialogue’ was accompanied by shouts and threats, poking with clubs on the legs, on the hands. Most of all went to our driver. He turned away to open the trunk, leaned over, and they started beating him on the arms and legs.

On 30 September 2021 Mozheyko was in Moscow, from where he called his mother. On 1 October a search was carried out in his apartment in Minsk, and in the evening it became known that Mozheyko had been detained and was in the center of isolation of offenders in Okrestina, Minsk. The Viasna Human Rights Centre, which was the first to report on Mozheyko's arrest, stated that he was detained in Moscow. The Permanent Commission on Human Rights in the Information Sphere of the Russian Presidential Council for Civil Society and Human Rights called for the release of Mozheyko. On 4 October 2021 the press secretary of the President of Russia, Dmitry Peskov, commented on the detention of Mozheyko, saying that he could not approve of the arrest of the journalist for his professional activities. On 4 October 2021 the Union of Journalists of Russia called for the release of Mozheyko.

On 6 October 2021, by a joint statement of six organizations, including the Viasna Human Rights Centre, the Belarusian Helsinki Committee, and the Belarusian PEN Center, Mozheyko was recognized as a political prisoner. On 11 October it became known that Mozheyko was charged under two articles of the Criminal Code of the Republic of Belarus for inciting social hatred (Article 130) and insulting a representative of the authorities (Article 369).

On 23 March 2023 the Minsk City Court sentenced Mozheyko to three years in a penal colony.

== See also ==
- Eduard Palčys
