= Viktar Vuyachych =

Award-winning Soviet Belarusian crooner

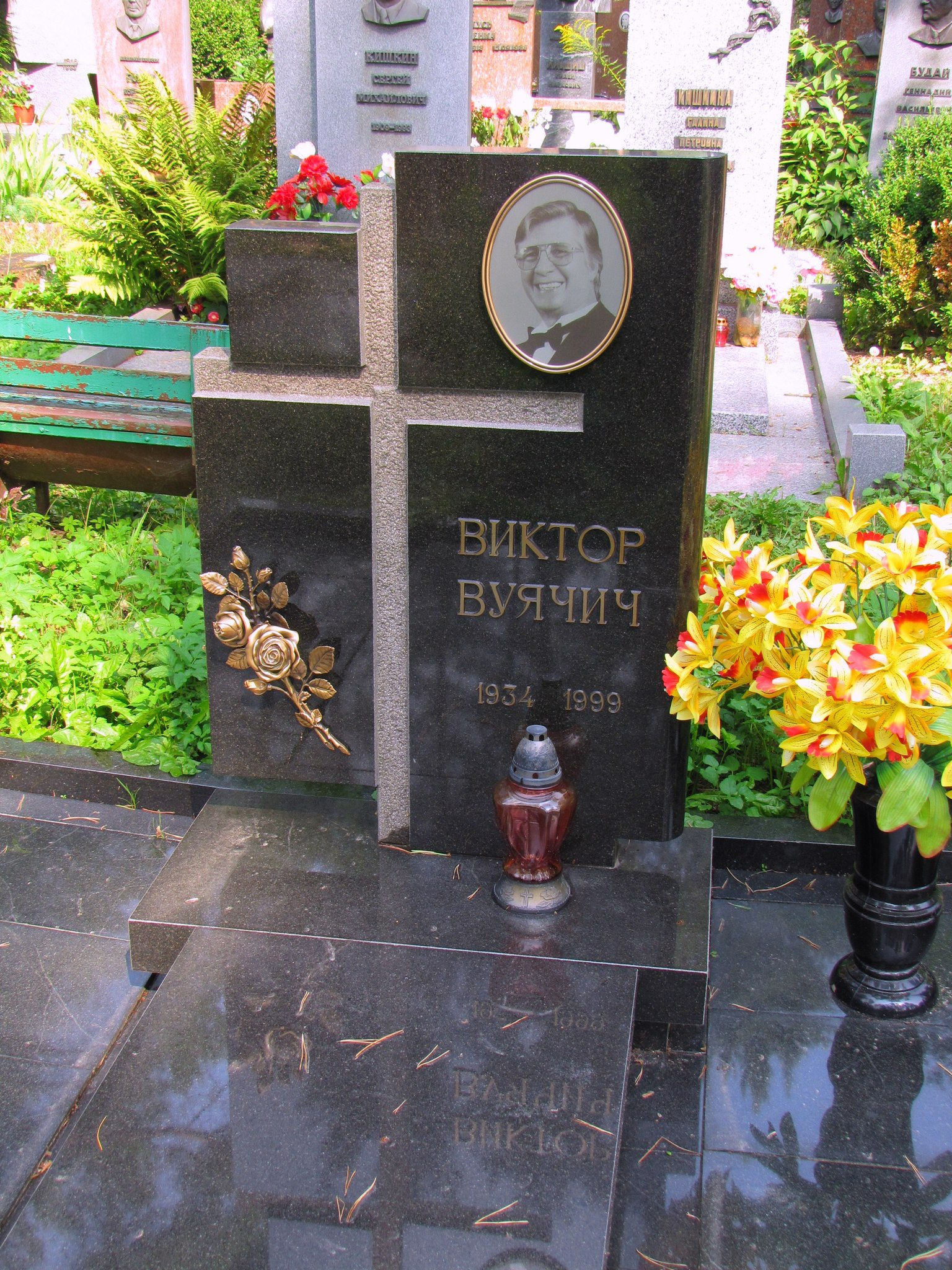
Vuyachych's grave in the Eastern Cemetery of Minsk

Viktar Lukyanovich Vuyachich (Note: Sometimes transcribed to English as Vuyachich) (Belarusian: Віктар Лук'янавіч Вуячыч, Russian: Ви́ктор Лукья́нович Вуя́чич; July 11, 1934 in Kharkiv, Ukrainian SSR, USSR – September 17, 1999 in Minsk, Belarus) was a Belarusian Soviet crooner. He was a winner of Soviet All-Union competitions as well as international competitions. Vuyachich was awarded the honorary title of People's Artist of Belarus.

Vuyachich's repertoire was rich and varied, including pop songs, patriotic songs, opera arias, and old romances. For many years he collaborated with several Belarusian composers. Belarusian pop music was important in his work. Vuyachich toured the Soviet Union and performed around the world.

After 1991, Vuyachich performed almost solely in Belarus, cooperating with state radio and the Belarusian State Philharmonic.

His wife is Svetlana Vuyachych (ru, née Yaskevich), dancer, People's Artist of Belarus.
