= Meydan Mosque, Kashan =

Mosque in Kashan, Iran

Meydan Mosque
- میدان مسجد
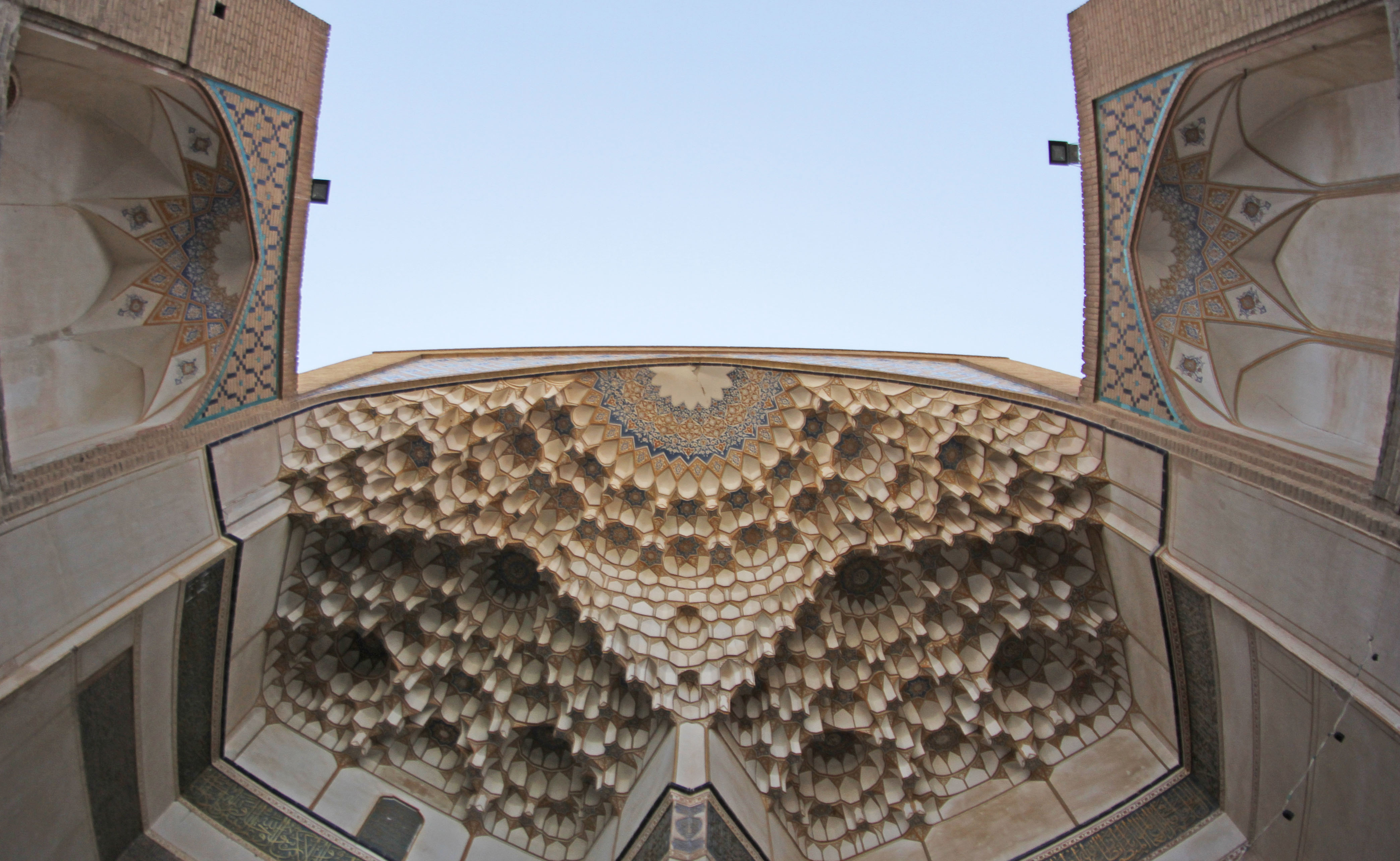
- Front view, 2017

- Location of the mosque in Iran

Religion
- Affiliation: Shia Islam
- Ecclesiastical or organisational status: Mosque
- Status: Active

Location
- Location: Kashan, Isfahan Province
- Country: Iran
- Coordinates: 33°59′12″N 51°27′08″E

Architecture
- Type: Mosque architecture
- Style: Seljuk; Khwarazmian; Timurid (reconstruction); Safavid (renovations); Qajar (entrance, renovations)
- Completed: 1218 CE; 1226 (mihrab); 1463 (reconstruction); 1624 (renovation); 1711 (sangab and door); 1828 (entrance)

Specifications
- Dome: One
- Minaret: One (destroyed in the 1778 Kashan earthquake)
- Materials: Bricks; stone; plaster; tiles

Iran National Heritage List
- Official name: Meydan Mosque
- Type: Mosque
- Designated: 1932
- Reference no.: 117
- Conservation organization: Cultural Heritage, Handicrafts and Tourism Organization of Iran

The Meydan Mosque (Persian: میدان مسجد; Arabic: مسجد ميدان) (Note: Also known as the Maydan Mosque, the Maidan Mosque, the Mir Emad Mosque, the Mir Imad Mosque, the Square Mosque (Kashan), the Emadi Mosque, and the Imadi Mosque.) is a mosque in Kashan, in the province of Isfahan, Iran. It is located in the southern side of the Sang-e Ghadimi square and beside the Bazaar of Kashan.

One of the oldest structures in Kashan, the mosque was added to the Iran National Heritage List on 6 January 1932, administered by the Cultural Heritage, Handicrafts and Tourism Organization of Iran.

== Architecture ==
The primary structure was possibly built during the Seljuq era. However, it was destroyed by the Mongols during their invasions.

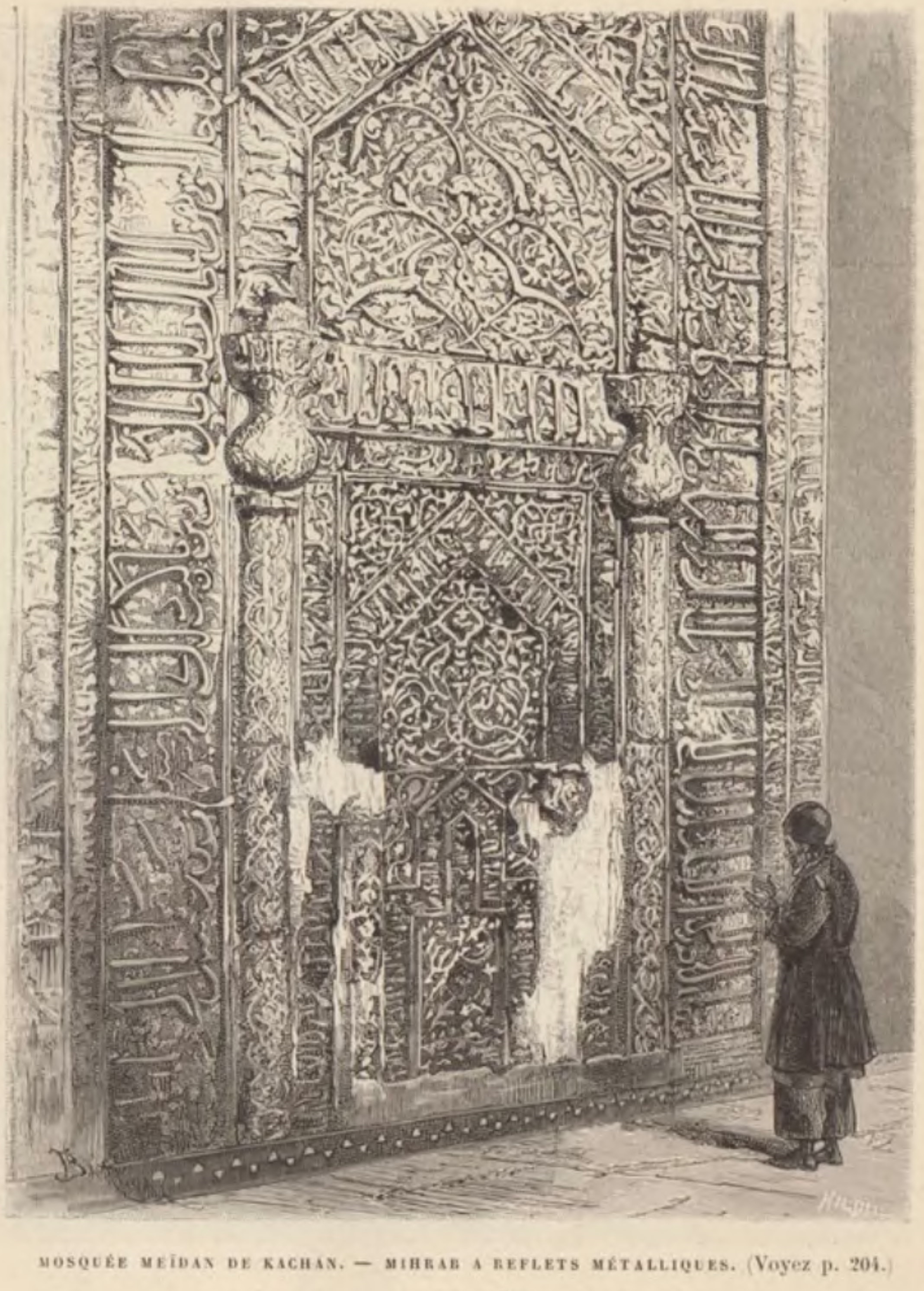
An 1887 drawing of the mihrab

Later it was rebuilt and repaired by Khaje Emad ed-Din. A quotation for this matter is an inscription in the old mihrab, in which it is mentioned that it is built in 623 AH (1225/1227 CE) by Hassan ebn-e Arabschah in Kashan. The mihrab was in its original place until the last century, and it is kept now in the Museum of Islamic Art in Berlin.

Jane Dieulafoy described the mihrab as follows:

"Meydan mosque is a spacious structure with an appropriate architectural technique, but its distinctive characteristic in comparison with other similar structures is its exquisite mihrab, which is covered with splendid tiles with metal reflections. With respect to their high-quality these tiles are like the famous tiles of Imamzadeh Yahya in Varamin."

Abd ol-Ghaffar Najm od-Dole predicted well in 1882 the future of the mihrab as follows:

"The embossed tiles, which I saw in the mihrab of Meydan mosque, were very interesting and spectacular. Westerners will buy them at least 2000 Tomans and will take the poor tiles away, if they can get a chance."

The mosque had in its past glorious times high iwans, a splendid inner dome space, large yard, Shabestan and Howz hall, but despite many repairs most parts of the mosque have been destroyed. The mosque had a special social and political importance, which can be realized from many orders written above its portal. These orders date back to the 15th century in the Kara Koyunlu era until the 19th century in the Qajar era. These orders include guidelines, regulations and commands about the buying and selling of goods and foodstuffs with approved prices of that time and about the prohibition of gambling and acts against the sharia.

The portal of the mosque stands out because of its pure Iranian architectural techniques.

The former stone minaret was destroyed in 1778 in the late Safavid era by an earthquake.

== See also ==
- Shia Islam in Iran
- List of mosques in Iran
- List of historical structures in Isfahan province
