= Lab-i Hauz =

Hauz complex in Bukhara, Uzbekistan

Coordinates: 39°46′23″N 64°25′13″E

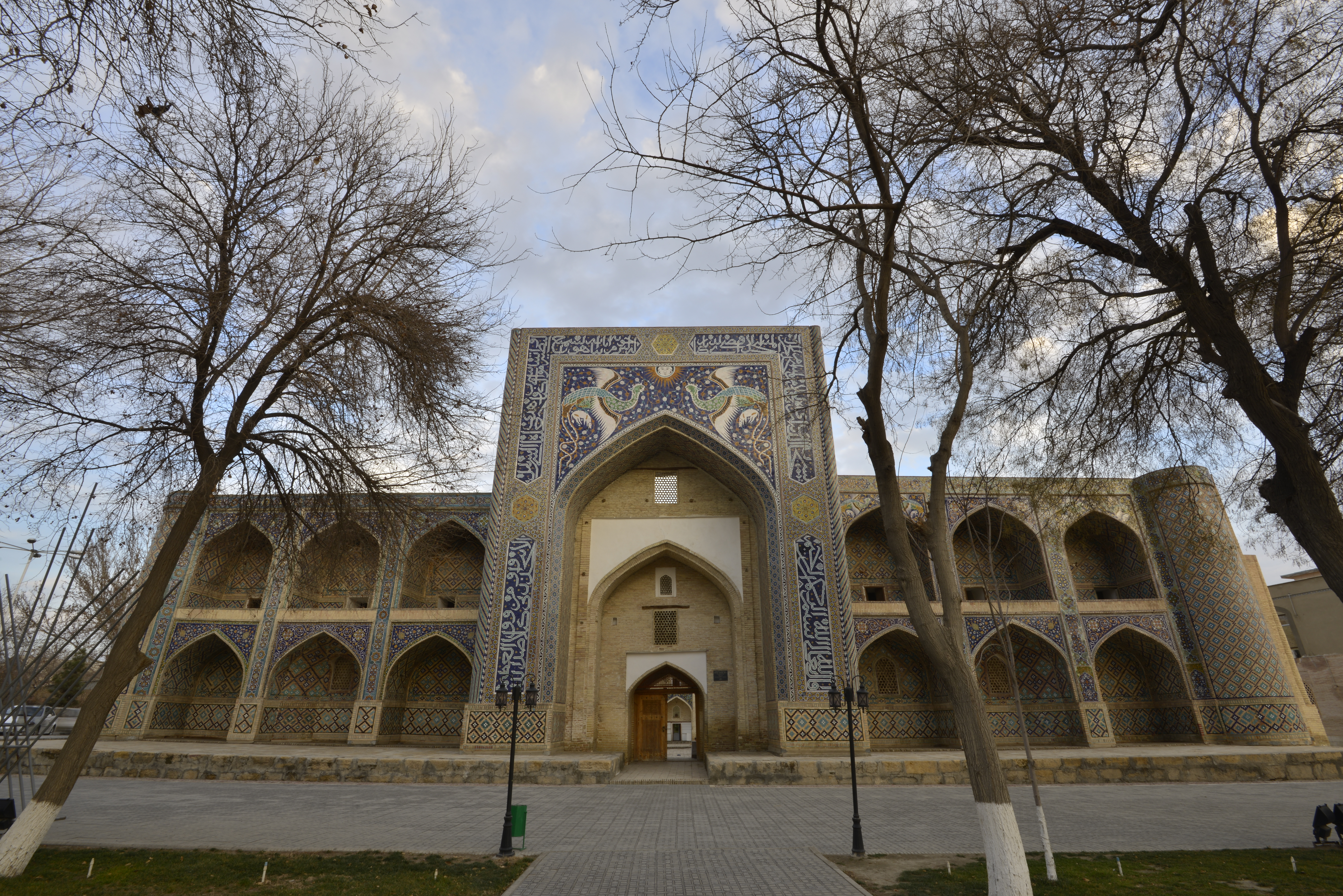
Nadir Divan-Beghi Madrasa, Lab-i Hauz

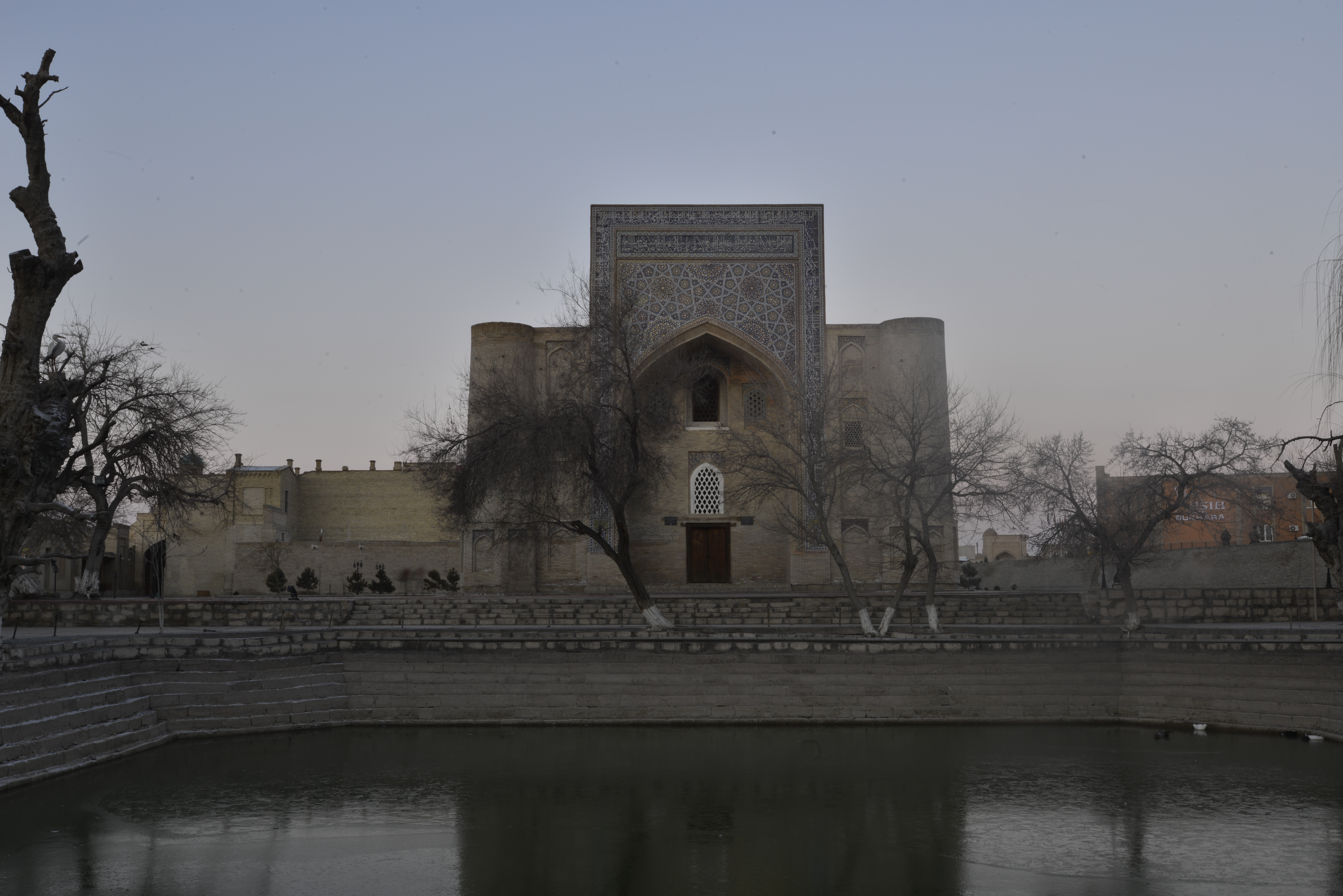
Khanqah Nadir Divan-Beghi

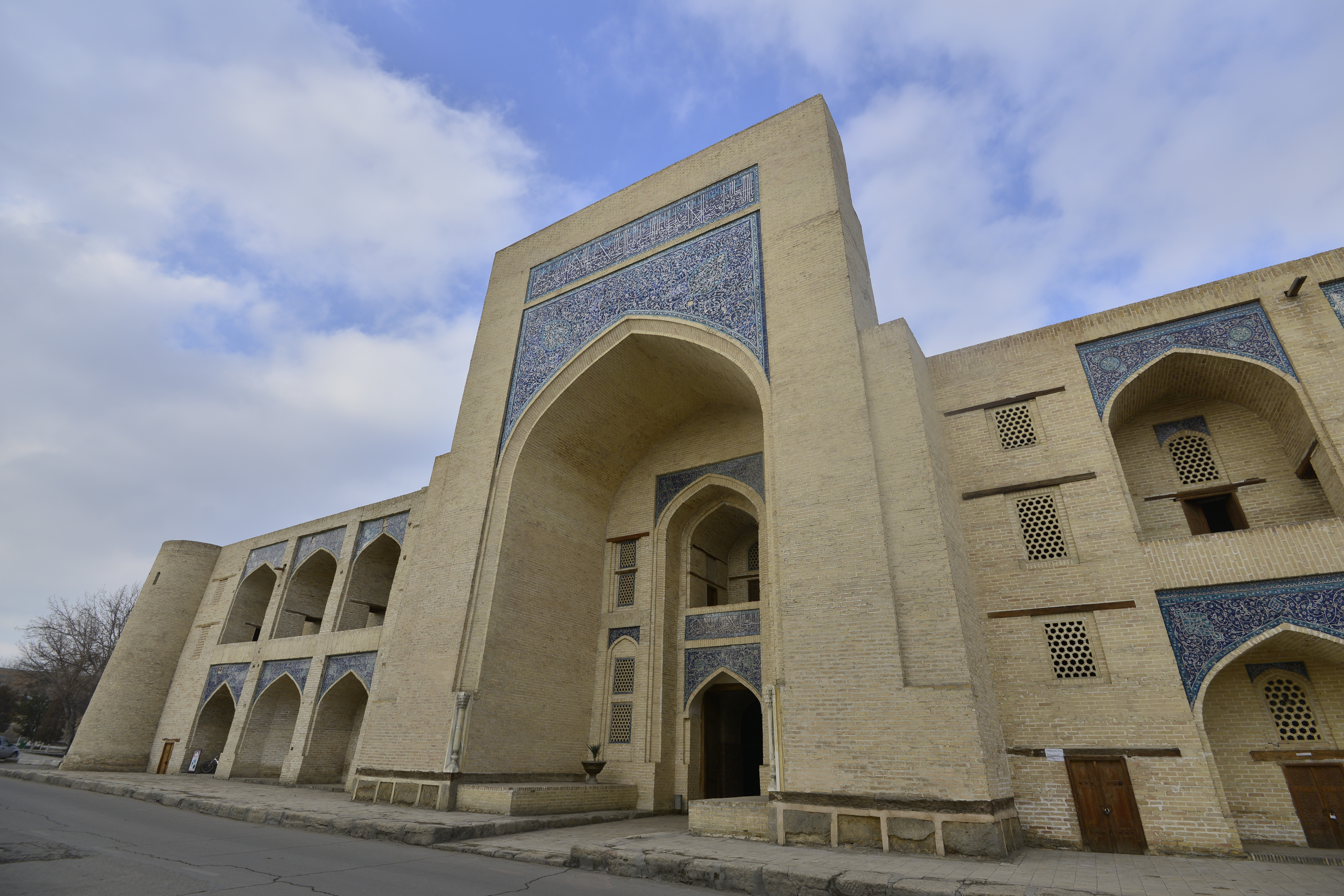
Kukeldash Madrasa

Lab-i Hauz (Note: Also written Lab-i-Hauz; sometimes also referred to as Lyabi-Khauz (Ляби-Хауз), a Russian approximation.) (Uzbek: Labihovuz, Tajik: Лаби Ҳавз, romanized: Labi Havz, from Classical Persian: لب حوض, romanized: Lab-i Ḥawż, lit. 'by the pool') is the name of the area surrounding one of the few remaining hauz pools that have survived in the city of Bukhara, Uzbekistan. Until the Soviet period, there were many such pools, which were the city's principal source of water, but they were notorious for spreading disease and were mostly filled in during the 1920s and 1930s.

The Lab-i Hauz survived because it is the centerpiece of a magnificent architectural ensemble, created during the 16th and 17th centuries, which has not been significantly changed since. The Lab-i Hauz ensemble, surrounding the pool on three sides, consists of the Kukeldash Madrasah (1568–1569, the largest madrasa in the city), on the north side of the pool, and two religious edifices built by Nadir Divan-Beghi: a khānaqāh (1620; Uzbek: xonaqoh, meaning a lodging house for itinerant Sufis) and a madrasa (1622), which stand on the west and east sides of the pool respectively. The small Qāzī-e Kalān Nasreddīn madrasa (now demolished) was formerly located beside the Kukeldash madrasah.

== History ==
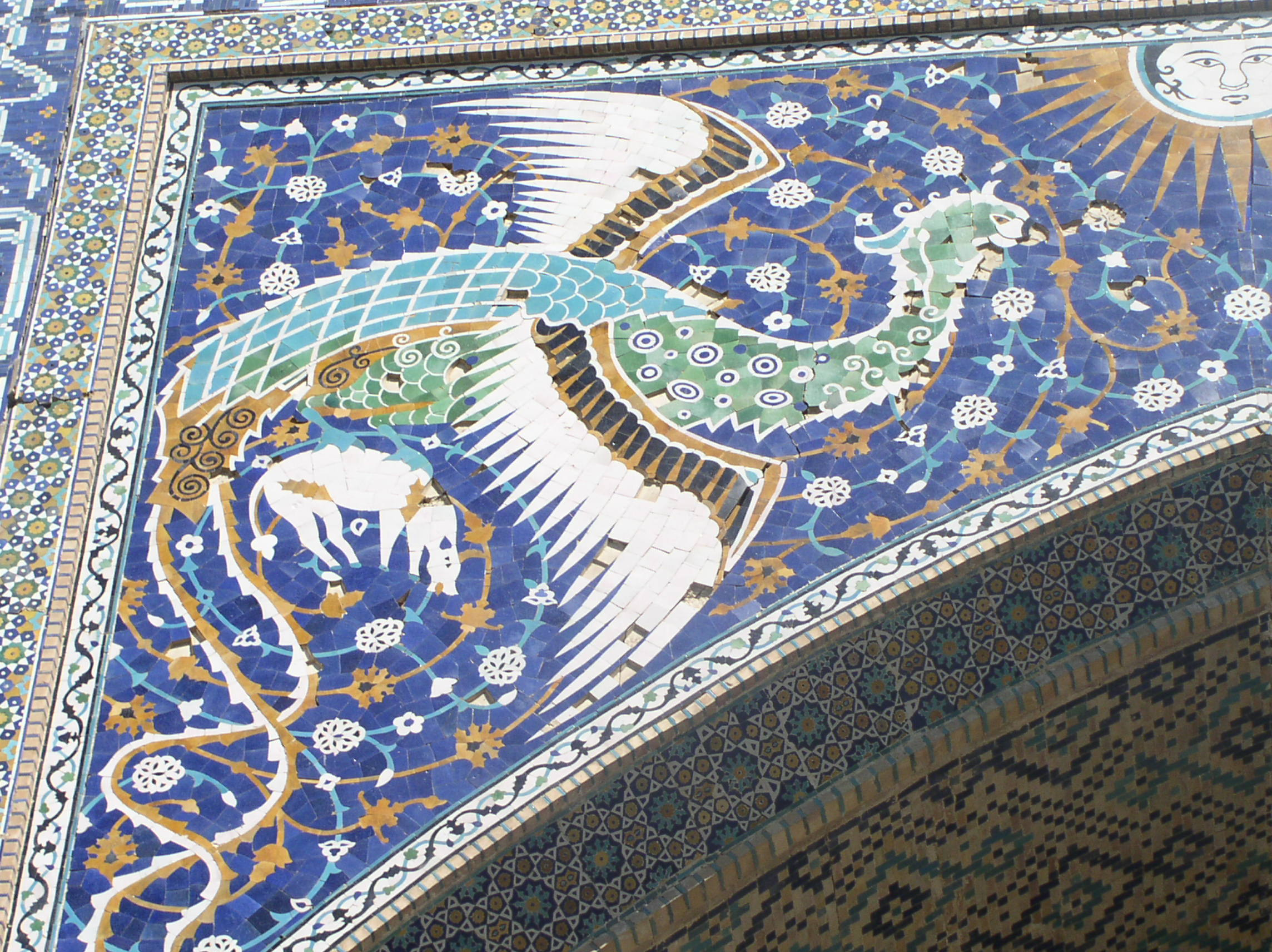
Simurgh on the portal of Nadir Divan-Beghi madrasah (part of Lab-i Hauz complex)

The history of this ensemble is closely connected with the name of Nadir Divan-Beghi, who was an important grandee, vizier, and also an uncle of the Emir of Bukhara Imam Quli Khan. It is said that when Nadir Divan-Beghi built the khanqah which bears his name, near the site of the building there was a large holding owned by an old Jewish widow. (There was a substantial population of Bukharan Jews.) Nadir Divan-Beghi had decided that this site would be the perfect place for a pool, but the widow turned down his offer to buy the property. Then Nadir Divan-Beghi brought her before Imam Quli Khan in the hope that the Emir would coerce her into selling. The Emir of Bukhara ordered a congress of muftis to inquire into the question. However, these specialists in Muslim law decided that there was no legal way to purchase the property, other than with the widow's consent, since Jews had rights on a par with Muslims if they paid the Jizya or poll-tax on non-Muslims.

So, Nadir Divan-Beghi had to build a small reservoir near the house of the widow. But he dug an aryk, an irrigation ditch, to his new pool in such a way that the water ran right near her house, although it was more expensive. Soon the water began to undermine the foundations of the widow's house. When she came to Nadir Divan-Beghi for justice, he confirmed his readiness to buy her house for a fair price. But widow rejected the money, laying down her own conditions instead. She promised give up her property if the Bukharan rulers would give to her another piece of land with permission to build a synagogue. In return for the widow’s holding Nadir Divan-Beghi gave her a plot of land, belonging to him, in a residential area, which later was named the Jewish quarter (Mahalli Kuma).

Soon the first synagogue at Bukhara and a large pool were built. People started to call it Lab-i Hauz (see picture), which means in Persian "by the pool". The date of its construction is about 1620. But folk memory still retains another epithet – Hauz-i Bazūr, "pool made with force".

== Kukeldash Madrasa (1568/1569) ==
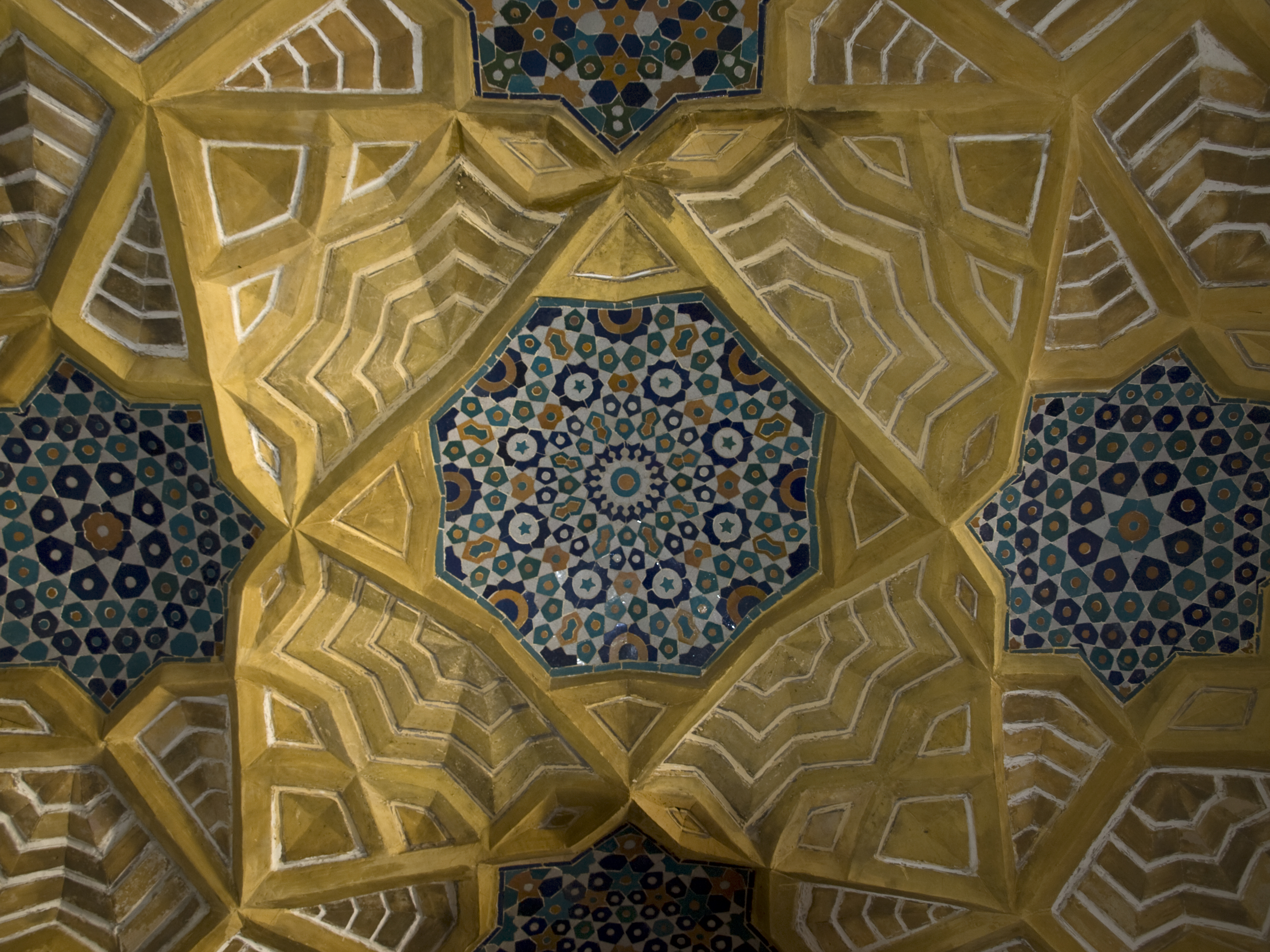
Detail of the ceiling in Kukeldash Madrasa

The madrasa is the oldest building of the ensemble. It has 160 cells, located in two stores on the perimeter of a two iwans yard. The traditional facades of the madrasah are adorned with majolica. Over its history, the madrasa performed many different roles: it served as a caravanserai and defensive fortress, and even as a place of execution. Today a section of the madrasa is a museum dedicated to the writers Sadriddin Ayni and Jalol Ikromiy.

== Khanqah of Nadir Divan-begi (1619/20) ==
Nodir Devonbegi Khanqah is a rectangular edifice topped with a dome. The building has non-traditional narrow and prolate main portal along with two lateral entrances. The hall (dhikr-khana) has excellent acoustic properties. The inner walls of the hall are recessed with niches fringed with stucco moldings. The dwelling space occupies corners and lateral exterior walls of the building. The finishing of the main entrance gate is made quite conservatively, with an exception of some floral elements in ornamentation. The edges of the main portal are overworked with epigraphy ornaments. The main front of the khanqah is cornered with towers cut at a level of the walls. Due to its location and size (side of the square hall is 11,2 m. - 36,75 ft.), the khanqah was the prominent cultural and religious centre of Bukhara.

== Madrasa of Nadir Divan-begi (1622/23) ==
Divan-begi is a title that designated the post right after Khan in the Bukhara Khanate. Nadir Divan-begi held this position during the reign of Imam Quli Khan of Bukhara (1611-1642), the strongest khan of the Ashtarkhanid (Janid) dynasty (established in 1599). The devotion to Islam tradition in the state under the Janid dynasty had paled before the eagerness of the Shaibanid khans in the previous century.
These two important peculiarities of the power were soon expressed in remarkable architecture tendency. In 1619 Yalantush-biy, who virtually independently governed Samarkand, had begun the construction of the Sher-Dor Madrasa. The richly colored finishing and the depiction of sun, tigers and antelopes, tell of a pioneering approach to artistic expression, unique in the Islamic world. In three years Nadir Divan-begi had followed Yalantush-biy with the construction of his own revolutionary structure (Nadir Divan-Begi Madrasah). The entrance portal has depictions of two simurgh carrying white deer, and a "man-in-the-sun" face.

== Maghoki Attori Mosque ==
Before the construction of the first synagogue Jews had shared a place in a mosque with Muslims. This mosque was called Masjed-e Maghākī-ye Attārī (see picture), i.e. "the mosque in a pit in the perfume market". Some say that Bukharian Jews and Muslims worshipped alongside each other in the same place at the same time. Other sources insist that Jews worshipped after Muslims.

Before the Arab conquest there was a bazaar on the site of Maghoki Attori. It was a market for idols, potions and spices – attar (perfumes) and other goods. Besides this, there was formerly a Temple of the Moon (Mah) close to this place. Narshakhi, in his History of Bukhara (ca. 950), named the mosque built on the site of the former temple "maghākī", i.e. "in a pit", because even then half of it was concealed from view by the rising soil level.

== Other details ==
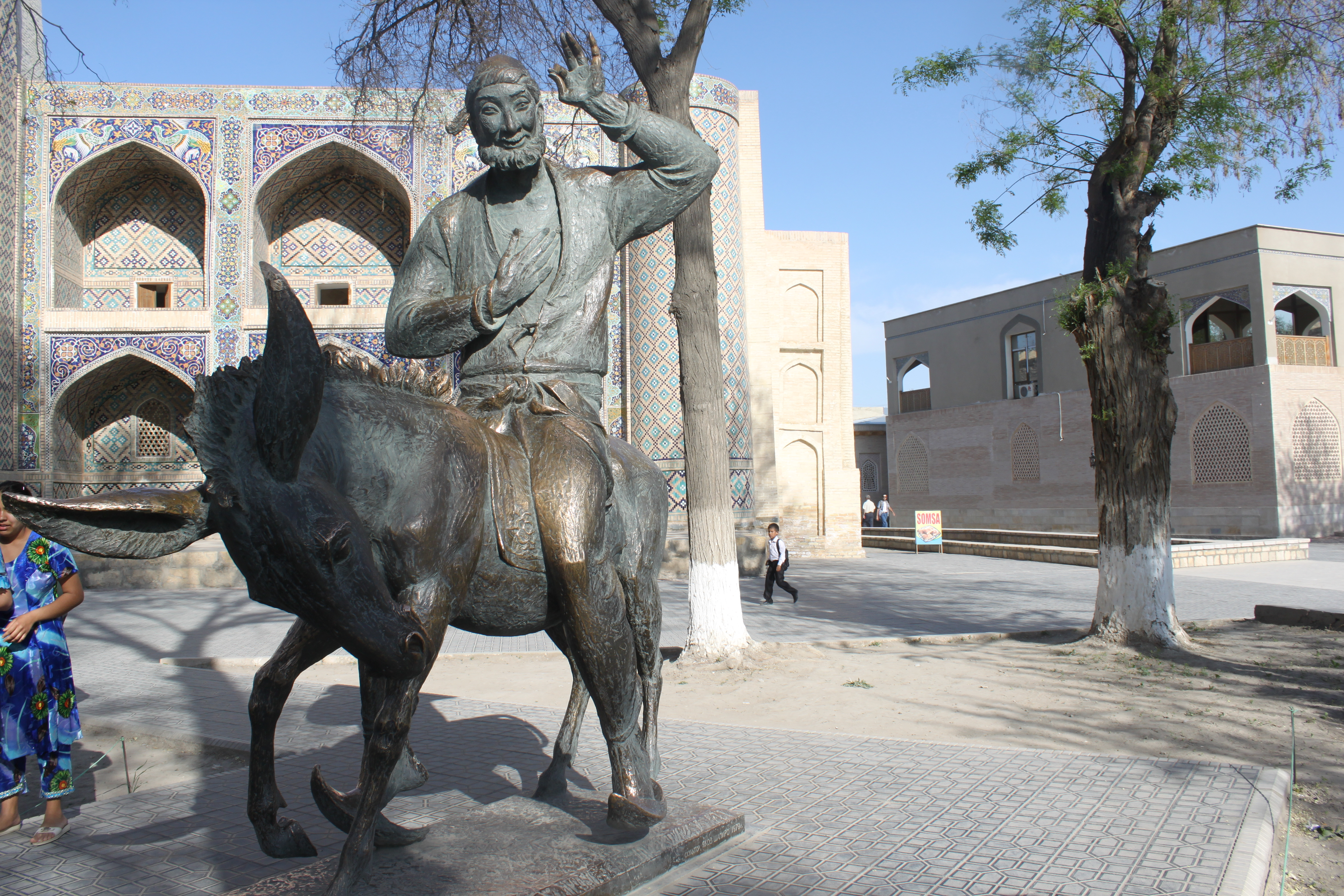
Statue of Nasreddin in Bukhara

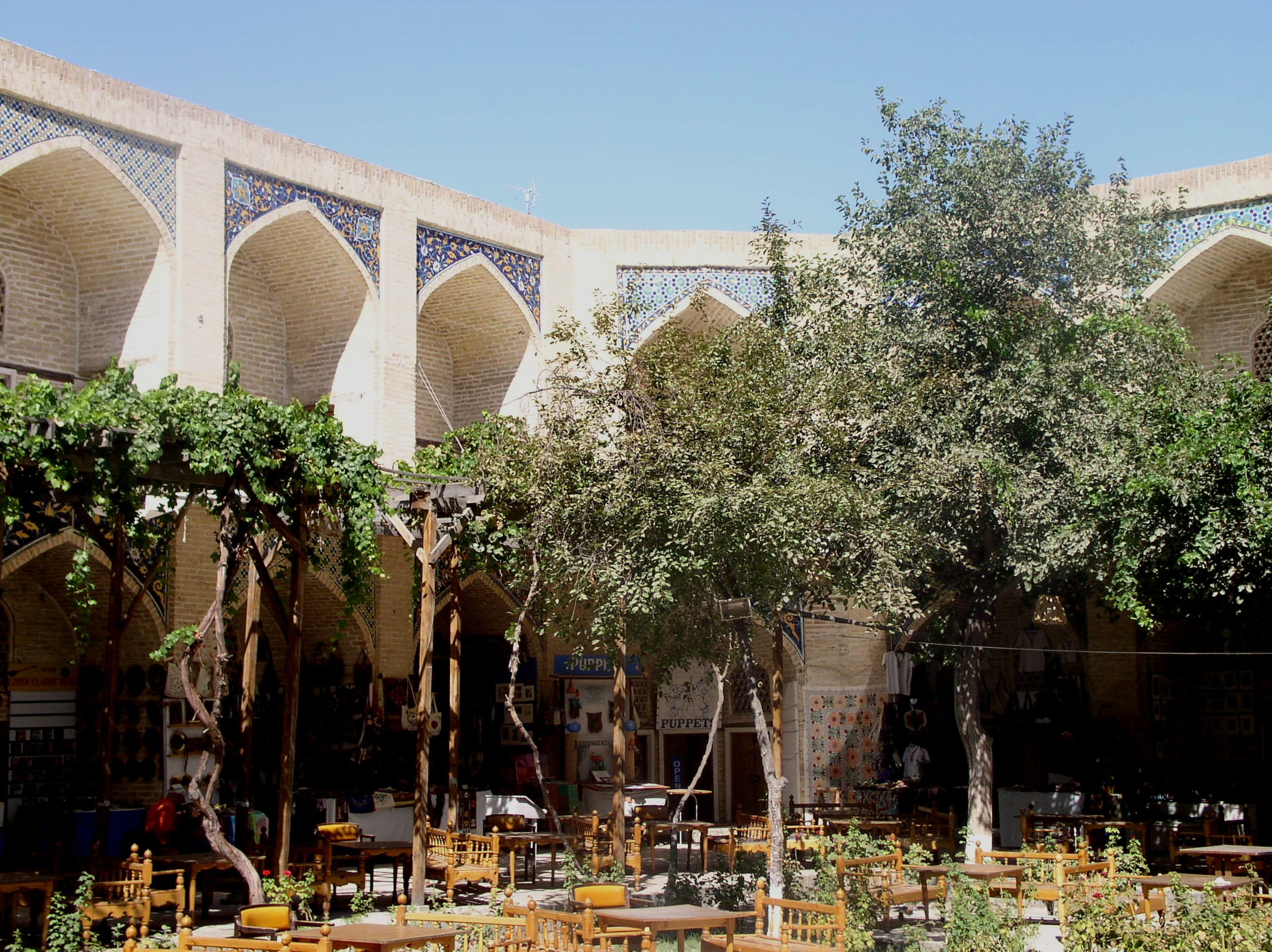
Nadir Divan-Beghi Madrasah courtyard

Today the Lab-i Hauz is a right-angled pool (46 x 36 meters), which stretches from the east to the west and is buried in the verdure of century-old trees. Its edges are arranged in the form of the descending staircase made of massive blocks of yellowish limestone.

On the Lab-i Hauz, there is also a modern statue of Nasreddin, a character in the folklore of the entire Muslim world, which the Uzbeks consider an Uzbek who was born and lived in Bukhara.

As stated above, the Kukeldash Madrasa is the biggest in Bukhara (80 x 60 meters). Kulbala Kukeldash ('the brother') was the name of the Emir's foster-brother who was the builder of this structure.

The Nadir Divan-Beghi Madrasa was initially erected as a caravanserai. At the inauguration ceremony Imam Quli Khan unexpectedly proclaimed the supposed caravanserai is to be a madrasa. So Nadir Divan-Beghi was obliged to rearrange the caravanserai by adding on to the front the loggias, the portal (Aywan) and angular towers. He also constructed an additional storey with cells.

The Nadir Divan-Beghi Khanqah is located opposite the Nadir Divan-Beghi Madrasa on the western side of the Lab-i Hauz.

== See also ==
- Samanid mausoleum
- Po-i-Kalyan
- Tourism in Uzbekistan
- Ogʻoch Sardoba

== Sources ==
- Degeorge, Gérard; Porter, Yves (2002). The Art of the Islamic Tile.
- Jayyusi, Salma K.; Holod, Renata; Petruccioli, Attilio (2008). The City in the Islamic World.
- Trotter, John Mowbray (1882). Western Turkestan.
