= 1778 Kashan earthquake =

Earthquake in Iran on 15 December 1778

- Location within Iran
- Local date: 15 December 1778
- Local time: Just before dawn
- Magnitude: 6.2 M_{s}
- Epicentre: 34.0°N 51.3°E
- Fault: Qom–Safreh Fault, Kashan segment
- Type: Strike-slip
- Max. intensity: MMI VIII (Severe)
- Casualties: >8,000

The city of Kashan in Iran was struck by a major earthquake just before dawn on 15 December 1778. The earthquake had an estimated magnitude of 6.2 M_{s}. There was widespread damage in the area around the city, with most buildings destroyed. More than 8,000 people were killed.

== Tectonic setting ==
The continuing continental collision between the Arabian plate and Eurasian plate drive the active tectonics of Iran. The convergence between the two plates is accommodated across a broad zone from the Zagros fold and thrust belt in the southwest to the Alborz mountain range in the north. Kashan lies close to the boundary between the Central Iranian Range to the southwest and the Central Basin to the northeast. The mixed volcanic rocks underlie these areas and metamorphic rocks of the Sanadaj-Sirjan zone (SSZ), the plutonic rocks of the Urumieh-Dokhtar magmatic arc and the sedimentary rocks of the Central Basin. The area is affected by a mixture of active thrust faulting and strike-slip faulting. The main active structure near Kashan is the Qom-Safreh Fault, a northwest–southeast trending right lateral strike-slip fault zone, which runs along the northeastern boundary of the SSZ. It has been associated with several historical earthquakes.

== Earthquake ==
The earthquake had an estimated magnitude of 6.2 M_{s}. It has been attributed to rupture along the Kashan segment of the Qom-Safreh fault. The mainshock was followed by a sequence of aftershocks, which continued for about a month.

== Damage ==
The area of damage extended as far north as Sen Sen and as far south as Qohrud. Most houses and other buildings in Kashan were destroyed. The Bazaar and the Jameh Mosque of Kashan were badly damaged, although the brick-built minaret of the latter survived. Water supplies were badly affected in the area.

== Casualties ==
At least 8,000 casualties were recorded as a result of the earthquake. The death toll was further increased by a cholera outbreak.

== Aftermath ==
Reconstruction of Kashan began soon after the earthquake, under the orders of Karim Khan Zand, preventing a mass exodus of the survivors. Under the leadership of 'Abd al-Razzaq Khan, the fourth governor of Kashan, a new bazaar was built directly on the basement of the old building and the Jameh Mosque of Kashan was extensively rebuilt, as were many other public buildings.
