= Jameh Mosque of Kashan =

Shi'ite mosque in Kashan, Isfahan, Iran

Jāmeh Mosque of Kashan
- مسجد جامع کاشان
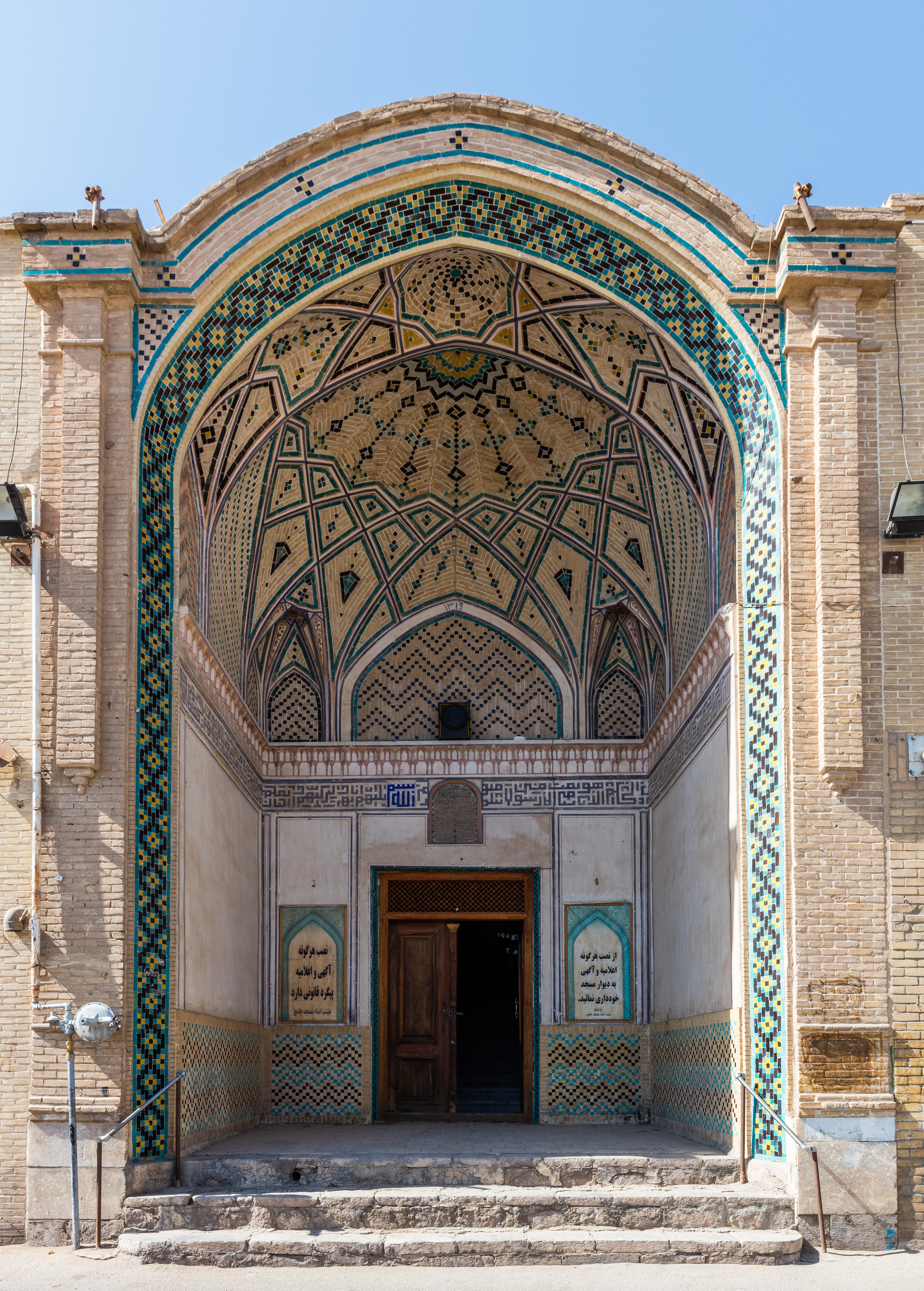
- The mosque entrance iwan, in 2016

- Location of the mosque in Iran

Religion
- Affiliation: Shia Islam
- Ecclesiastical or organisational status: Friday mosque
- Status: Active

Location
- Location: Kashan, Isfahan province
- Country: Iran
- Coordinates: 33°59′01″N 51°26′37″E

Architecture
- Type: Mosque architecture
- Style: Razi; Seljuk; Zand
- Completed: 7th century (original structure); 1074 CE (main); 1793 (renovation)

Specifications
- Dome: One
- Minaret: One
- Materials: Bricks; plaster

Iran National Heritage List
- Official name: Friday Mosque of Kashan
- Type: Friday Mosque
- Designated: 1936
- Reference no.: 252
- Conservation organization: Cultural Heritage, Handicrafts and Tourism Organization of Iran

The Jāmeh Mosque of Kashan (Persian: مسجد جامع کاشان) is a Shi'ite Friday mosque (jāmeh), located in Kashan, in the province of Isfahan, Iran.

The mosque is the oldest structure in Kashan and it was added to the Iran National Heritage List on 20 June 1936, administered by the Cultural Heritage, Handicrafts and Tourism Organization of Iran.

== Overview ==
The mosque was built on the site of the 7th-century Zoroastrian fire temple that existed before the Arab conquest of Iran.

The plan of the mosque is simple. There is a howz in the sahn in front of the iwan, which leads to the inner space of the dome and also two shabestans at grade of the courtyard and a winter shabestan below the surface of the courtyard. The large old mihrab-like minaret seems to belong to the Seljuk era. It has exquisite stucco, on which there are verses from Quran about the virtue of Friday prayer. It seems that this large mihrab was destroyed intentionally because of its false direction of qibla. Instead of this mihrab a smaller one has been built in the true direction of qibla during the reign of Tahmasp I. Its only brick minaret is located in its southeastern corner. On the bottom part of the minaret, there is a Kufic inscription made by embossed brick. On the inscription, the construction date of the minaret is mentioned, which is 1074 CE, making it the third oldest minaret in Iran, which has an inscription.

In the book Merat ol-Boldan, the mosque is described as follows:

"The mosque, which is known in Kashan as Jameh mosque, has one mihrab with a right qibla and a mihrab with a wrong qibla. The founder of the mosque was Safie Khatun, Malik al-Ashtar's daughter."

The mosque was extensively renovated in 2024.

== Gallery ==
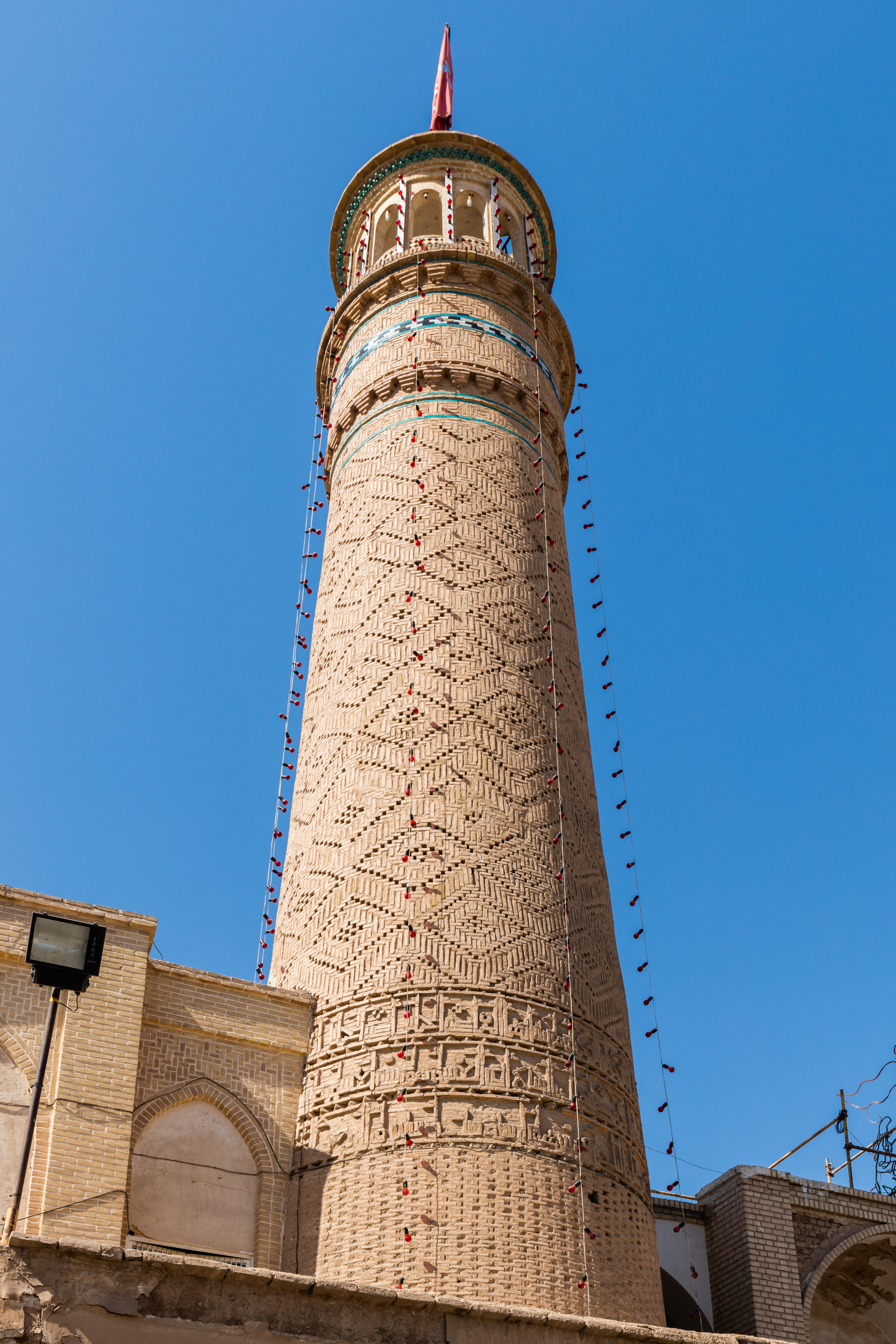

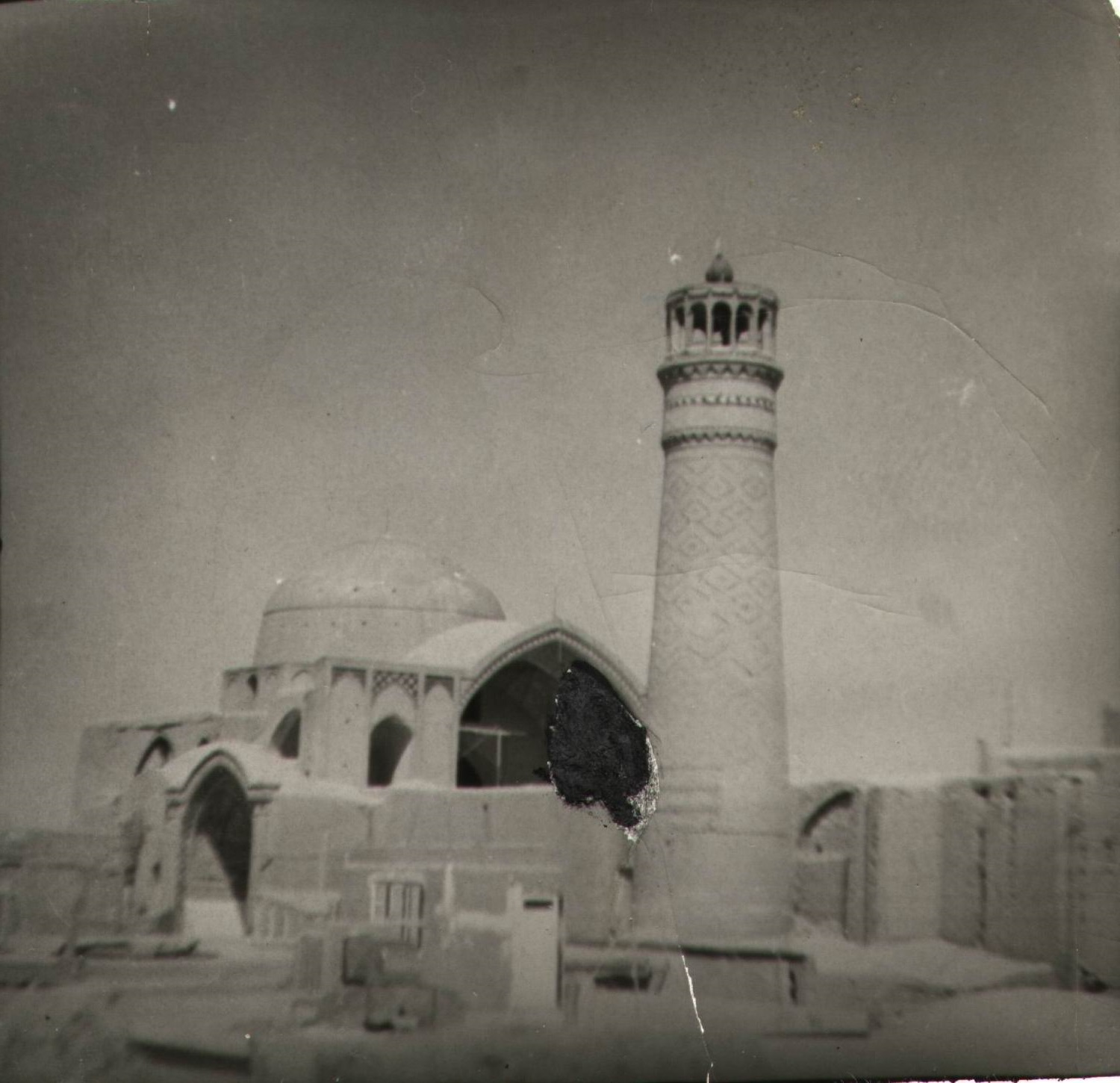

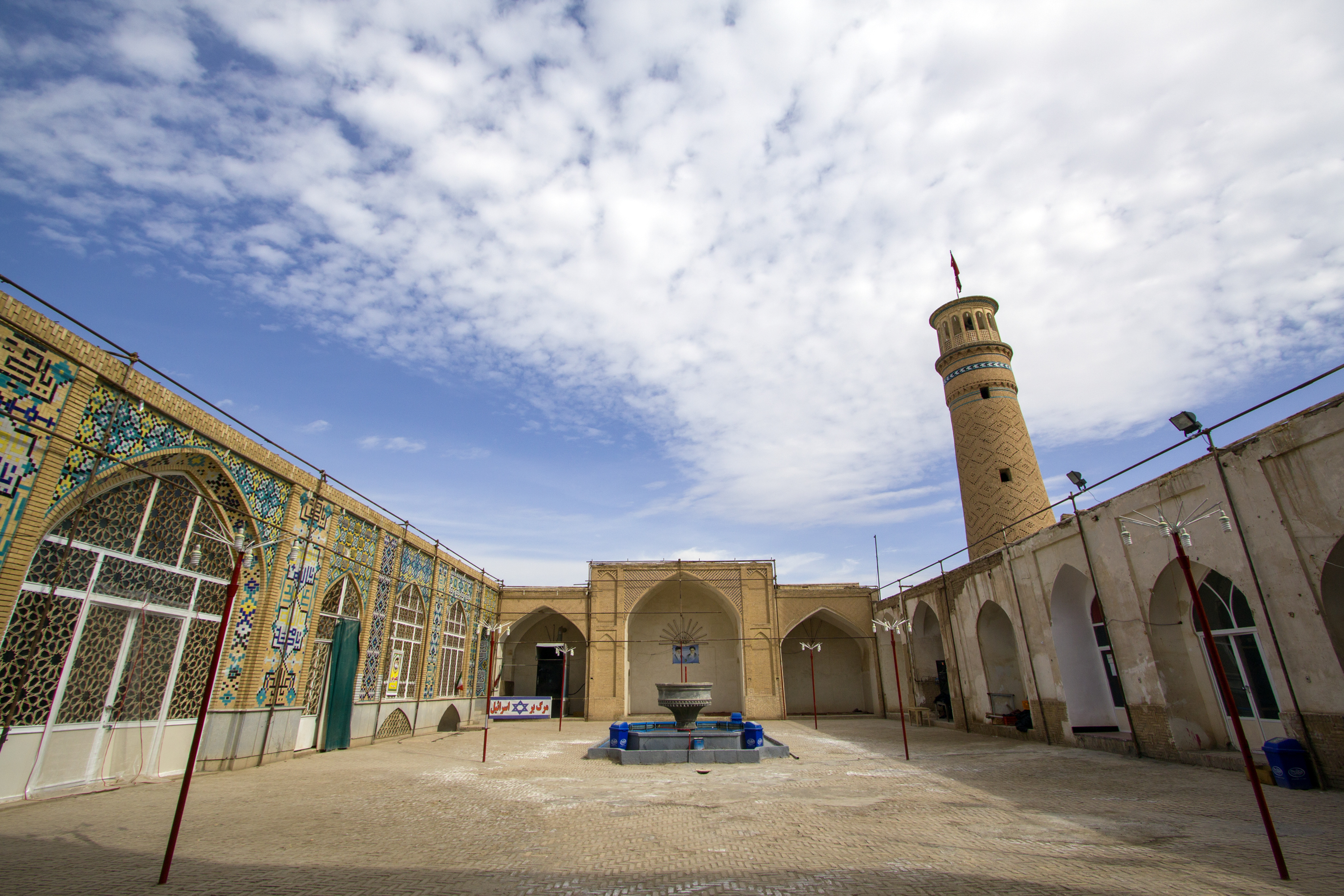

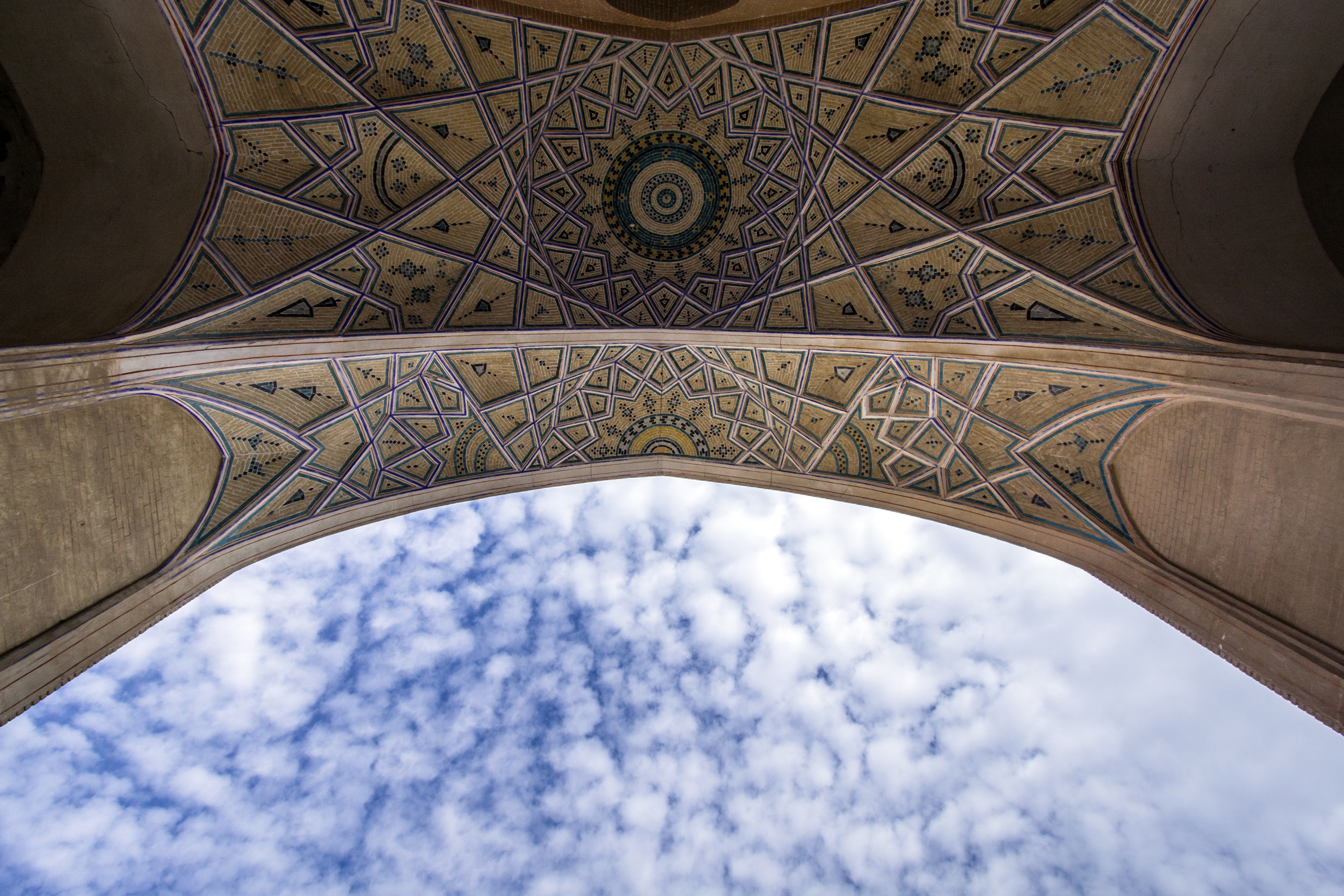

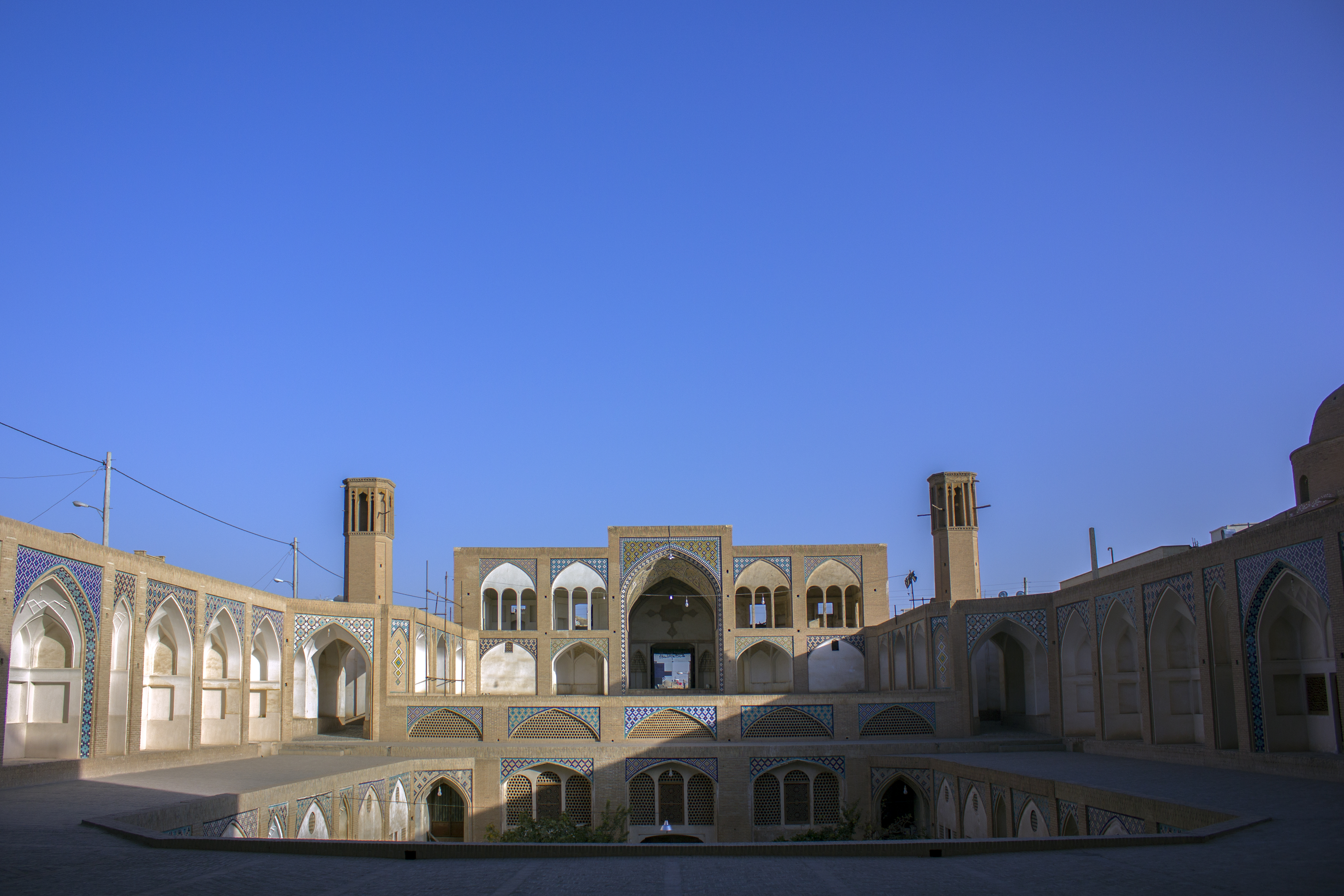

== See also ==
- Shia Islam in Iran
- List of mosques in Iran
- List of historical structures in Isfahan province
