= Khanqah of Nodir Devonbegi =

Khanqah Nodir Devon Begi
- Nodir devonbegi xonaqohi (Uzbek)
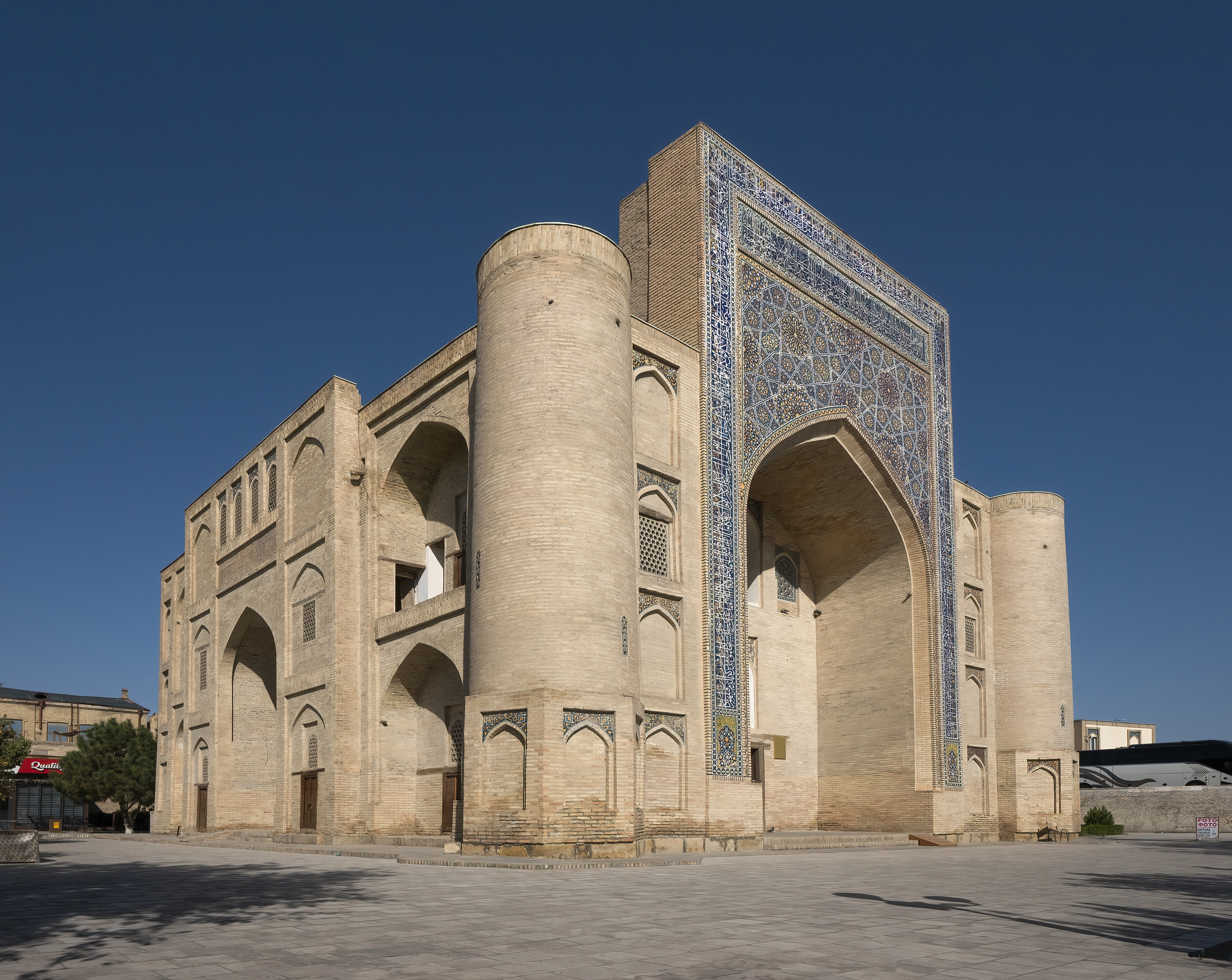
- Khanaka (Khanqah) Nodir Devon Begi. Bukhara
- Interactive map of Khanqah Nodir Devon Begi
- 39°46′23″N 64°25′11″E
- Type: Khanqah
- Location: The city of Bukhara
- Nearest city: Bukhara

History
- Built: 1620-1621
- Built for: Mosque
- Original use: Nodir Devon Begi

Site notes
- Restored: 1914-1916
- Restored by: Sayyid Mir Muhammad Alim Khan

Nodir Devonbegi (Uzbek: Nodir devonbegi xonaqohi) is a historical memorial in Bukhara, Uzbekistan. It was established by Nodir Devonbegi (Nodir Mirzo Togay ibn Sultan), the vizier and brother of the ruler of Bukhara, Imamquli Khan, in 1620–1621. The khanqah has been included in the national list of intangible cultural heritage objects of Uzbekistan. It is a type of building that served as a place of residence and worship for Sufi mystics.

== History ==
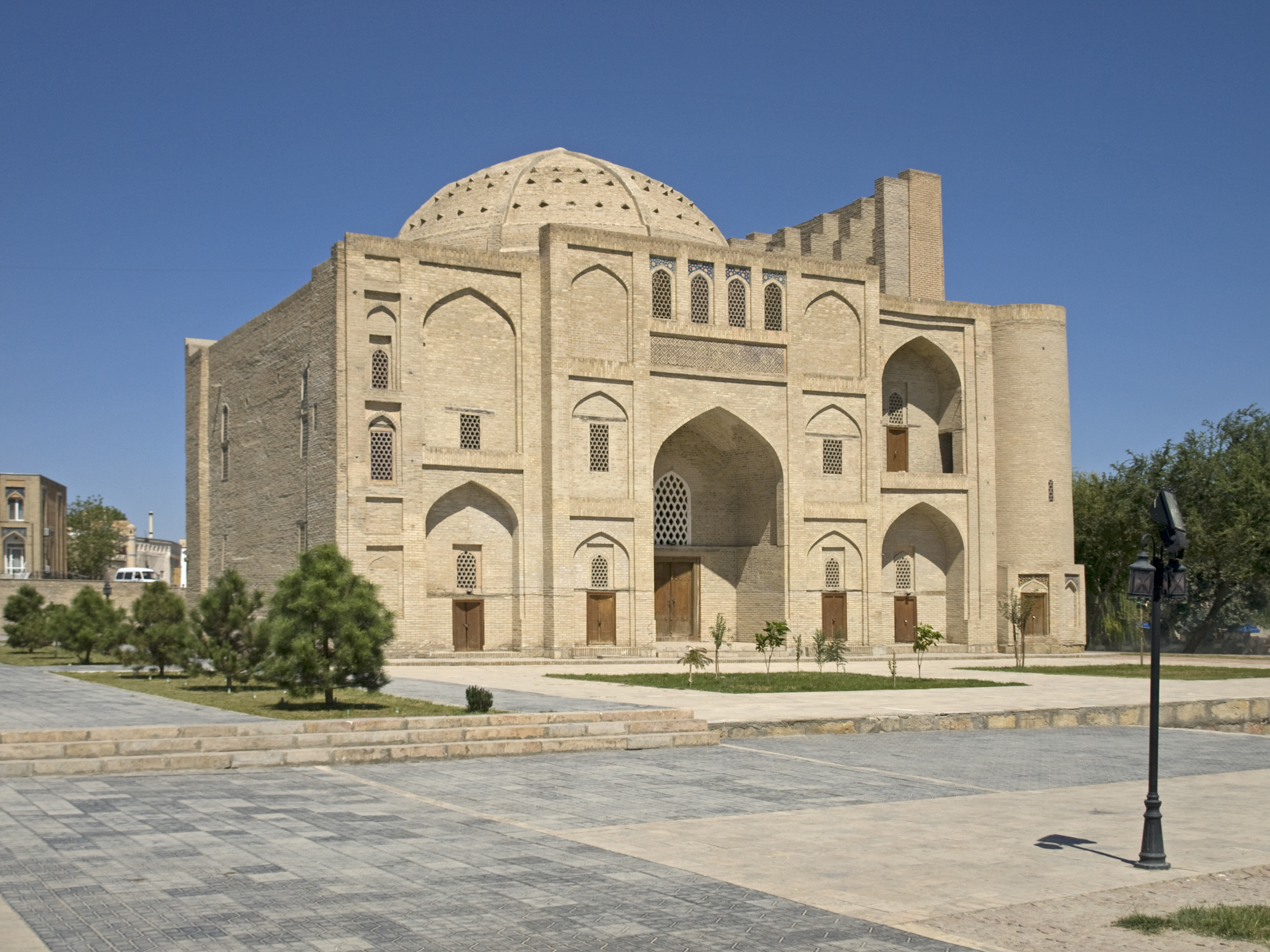
View from the south

The Nodir Devonbegi Khanaka was constructed in 1620, along with a pond that is part of the Lyab-i Hauz ensemble, a complex of historical buildings in the center of Bukhara. The Khanaka primarily served as a residence for dervishes, with the Labi Hovuz located nearby, which was dug in 1620.

The Khanaka is a multi-roomed structure with two large minaret-like towers forming its entrance. It has 28 small domes on the roof. The central dome hall of the Nodir Devonbegi Khanaka has doors on three sides and a mihrab (prayer niche) on the west side. The corners of the Khanaka have cells. For a certain period, the Khanaka served as a madrasa and a shelter and mosque for those coming from distant regions. The Nodir Devonbegi Khanaka, located in Mulla Shamsiddin Guzar, has 14 cells.
According to the endowment documents, to the west of the Khanaka is the house of Mirzo Aboqi Arbob Mirzo Husayn, to the east and north is a road, and to the south is a pool. The endowment document is titled "The Endowment of Nodir Devonbegi Madrasa, Pool, and Khanaka."
Researcher Abdusattor Jumanazarov suggests that initially, the memorial served as a Friday mosque and was later transformed into a Khanaka. Currently, the building houses the Ancient Varakhsha and Applied Arts History Museum of Bukhara State Museum-Preserve. This museum was established in 1991 and was renamed in 2017 as the History Museum of Ancient Varakhsha and Applied Arts, with modifications made to its exhibits.

== Architecture ==
Nodir Devonbegi Khanqah was built in the style of Central Asian architecture, which is characterized by the use of bricks, domes, arches, and geometric and floral patterns. It is part of the Labi Hovuz ensemble and was constructed simultaneously with a pool. The entrance portal is adorned with a majestic main entrance, and the height of the portal's dome is quite significant, with fragments of the tiles of the qashani preserved in some places. Two diagonally fluted minaret-like towers on both sides enhance its grand appearance. The Khanaka has entrance doors on both sides leading to cells.
The walls have been repaired several times, with the last major restoration carried out by Sayyid Olimkhon, the last ruler of Bukhara, between 1914 and 1916. This has led to a change in the original appearance of the walls. The Nodir Devonbegi Khanaka has a symmetrical layout (27.5 x 25 meters) with an Iwan in the center, surrounded by a hall (11.2 x 11.2 meters), and two-story cells for dervishes on its sides. The dome is crowned with a building top adorned with a spiral ornament. The Khanaka has a large dome, and the walls are decorated with terracotta tiles. The upper part of the walls lacks preserved inscriptions. The iwan's facade has three hanchkori fence windows with carved grilles. The present appearance of the Nodir Devonbegi Khanaka has been altered to be more elegant, sophisticated, and reminiscent of ancient architecture. In 1978, under the initiative and leadership of the cultural figure Abdug'affor Haqqulov, it underwent another renovation in Uzbekistan.

== Bibliography ==
- Bahromov Q, Shodiyev N (2020). Buxoro tarixiy obidalari geografiyasi (in Uzbek). Bukhara: Durdona Publish. p. 129.
- Abdusattor Jumanazarov (2017). Buxoro ta'lim tizimi tarixi (in Uzbek). Tashkent: Akademnashr. p. 592. ISBN 978-9943-4728-2-2.
