= Ogʻoch Sardoba =

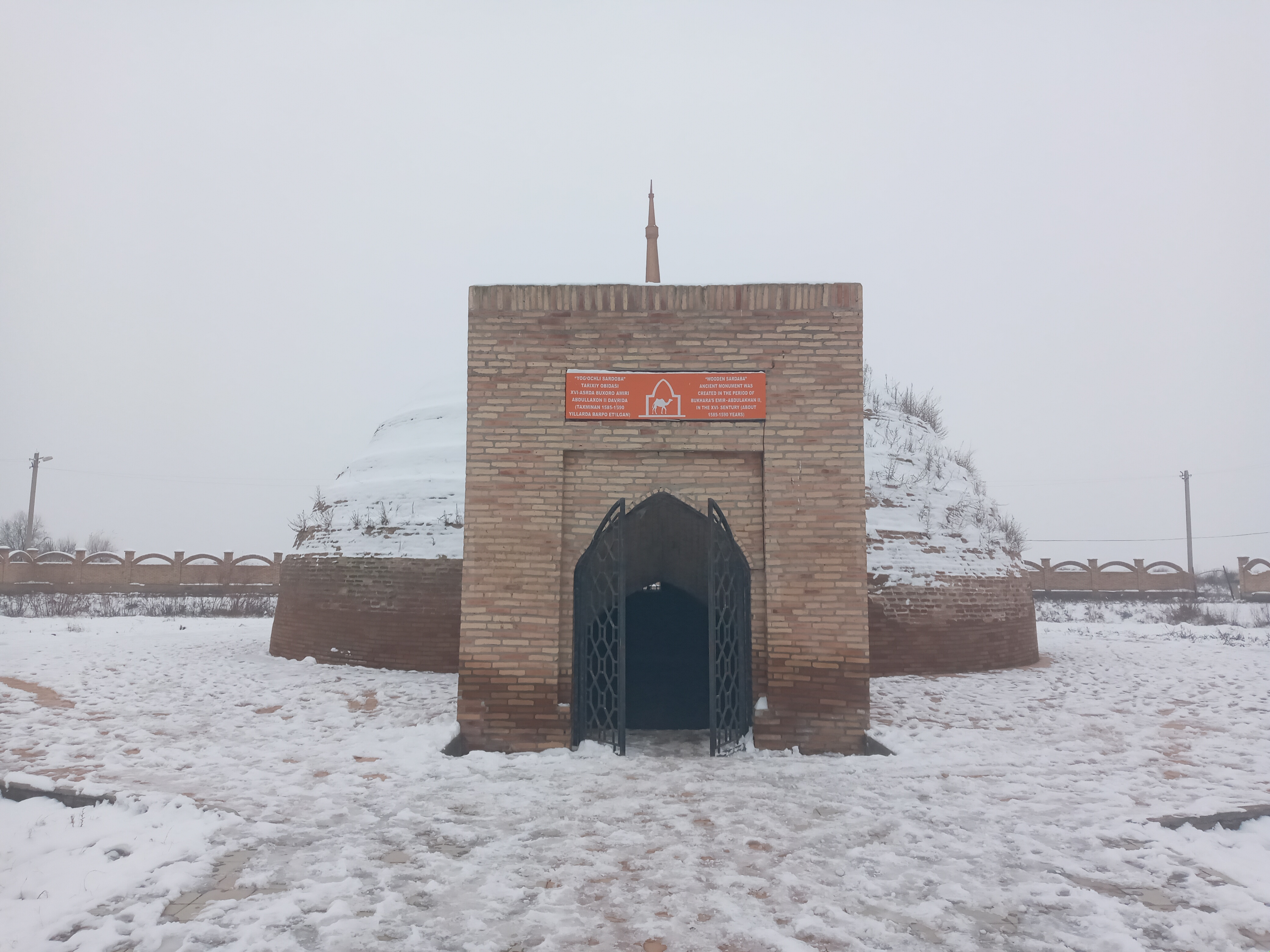
- Front view of Ogʻoch Sardoba
- Interactive map of the Ogʻoch Sardoba area

General information
- Architectural style: Medieval Uzbek
- Location: Gumbaz village, Sardoba district, Sirdaryo region, Uzbekistan
- Coordinates: 40.324454°N 68.110663°E
- Year built: 16th century
- Renovated: 2001
- Owner: State of Uzbekistan

Height
- Height: 8 meters

Technical details
- Material: Baked bricks and wood
- Size: 27 meters in diameter
- Floor count: 1

Design and construction
- Architect: Unknown

External videos
- A short video clip of Ogoch Sardoba and a poem written for it
- Sardoba - an ancient water storage. Historical monuments of Uzbekistan

The Ogʻoch Sardoba (Uzbek: Ogʻoch Sardoba, pronounced [oʁotʃ sɑrdobɑ]; other names: Yogʻochli Sardoba, Khudoysera Sardoba) is a historical monument located in Gumbaz village of Sardoba district, Sirdaryo region of Uzbekistan, near the M39 highway that connects the cities of Tashkent, Samarkand and Bukhara. It is a type of ancient water reservoir that was built in Central Asia to store water for travelers and caravans. It is one of the three sardobas that existed in Mirzachul and the only one of its kind in the region.

Ogʻoch Sardoba was also known as Khudoysera in the Middle Ages.

Sardoba was built in the 16th century during the reign of Uzbek ruler Abdulla Khan (1557—1598), but there is a legend that it was built during the time of Amir Timur (1370—1405).

The historical monument is included in the national register of immovable cultural heritage of Uzbekistan and is under state protection. It is also one of the four ecotourism objects in Sirdaryo region.

The water level in the reservoir has become unsuitable for consumption due to the rise of saline water around the sardoba.

== Names ==
The word “sardoba” comes from Persian and means “cold water”. Og'och Sardoba was also known as Khudoysera in the Middle Ages. In the national register of immovable cultural heritage of Uzbekistan, it is referred to as Ogʻoch.

== Location ==
There are 44 sardobas in and around Uzbekistan, of which 29 are in the Karshi steppe, 3 in Mirzachul, 3 in the ancient trade route between Tashkent and Fergana, and one in Malikchul near Karmana.

There were several caravan routes passing through Mirzachul in history. Og'och Sardoba is located near one of these routes, 30 km south of Mirzasardoba, 35 km north of Jizzakh. Currently, this place belongs to the territory of Gumbaz village of Sardoba district, Sirdaryo region of Uzbekistan.

According to researchers, the construction of the sardobas in Mirzachul is related to the building activities of Amir Timur and Abdulla Khan.

== History ==
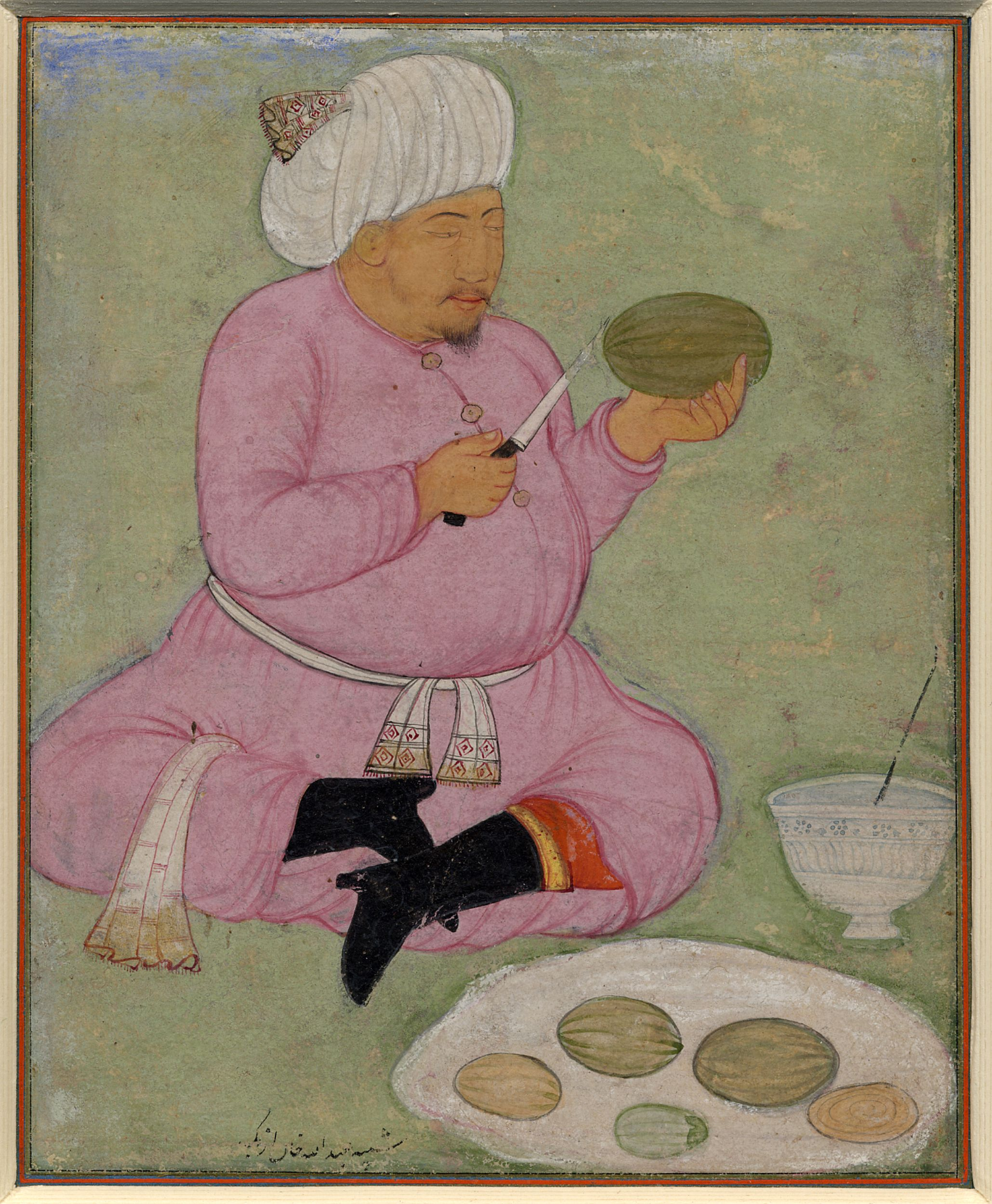
Uzbek ruler Abdullaxon II (1583—1598)

The first information about Ogʻoch Sardoba is found in the work “Abdullanoma” by Hafiz Tanish al-Bukhari. According to him, Uzbek Khan Abdulla Khan (1557—1598) “stopped in this area to dig a canal during his military campaign to Tashkent, and ordered to build a caravanserai and a sardoba for his soldiers who suffered from thirst”.

Ogʻoch Sardoba was built in the second half of the 16th century (in 1580 or 1585—1590). It is estimated that its bricks were baked in Samarkand or in the territory of the present-day Gallaorol district, and brought here.

The water around the sardoba was supplied by man-made canals. Special flat pipes were installed for the water to enter the sardoba, and they were connected by circular pipes.

There were two inner reservoirs. These reservoirs had wells and were constantly filled with cold water. Later, one of the reservoirs was closed and now there is only one reservoir left. The sardoba reservoir was drained and an open pool was built in front of it to prevent the monument from being damaged by water. The snow and rain water that flowed from the surroundings first collected in the pool, then the clean water flowed into the sardoba. The pool was fenced with clay walls to prevent livestock from entering and polluting it.

According to the historians of the 20th century, there were gardens and vineyards near the caravanserai along with the sardoba. According to the historians of the 19th century, there was a special room for the caretakers and guards on top of the unique passage at the entrance of the sardoba. It was accessed by a wooden staircase outside the monument.

During the Soviet period, a well was dug inside the sardoba by the “Europeans”. The walls of this well were covered with wood.

After Uzbekistan gained independence, Ogʻoch Sardoba underwent several restoration works. In 2001, the surroundings of the historical monument were completely fenced, wooden windows were installed in the front part and a door was installed at the entrance and the paths were paved with flat stones around the historical monument.

A metal door was built on the porch of the historical monument and the interior was completely renovated and special lights were installed and trees and flowers were planted around the sardoba. However, later its reconstruction was stopped.

In 2019, the sardoba became ruined and fell into a miserable state. The surroundings of the monument were covered with iron bars, and its door was tied with a cloth. The area around it was full of garbage, and the construction of two buildings nearby was not completed (2019). There was almost no condition for tourists in the area where Ogʻoch Sardoba was located. Sardoba was included in the national register of immovable cultural heritage of Uzbekistan approved in 2019 and was taken under state protection.

According to the content of the resolution adopted by the People’s Deputies Council of Sardoba district in 2021, several officials of the district were assigned the tasks of developing and approving specific measures to include the historical monument in the tourist route and ensuring its implementation for the next session. That is, they had to make organizational and practical proposals at the next session.

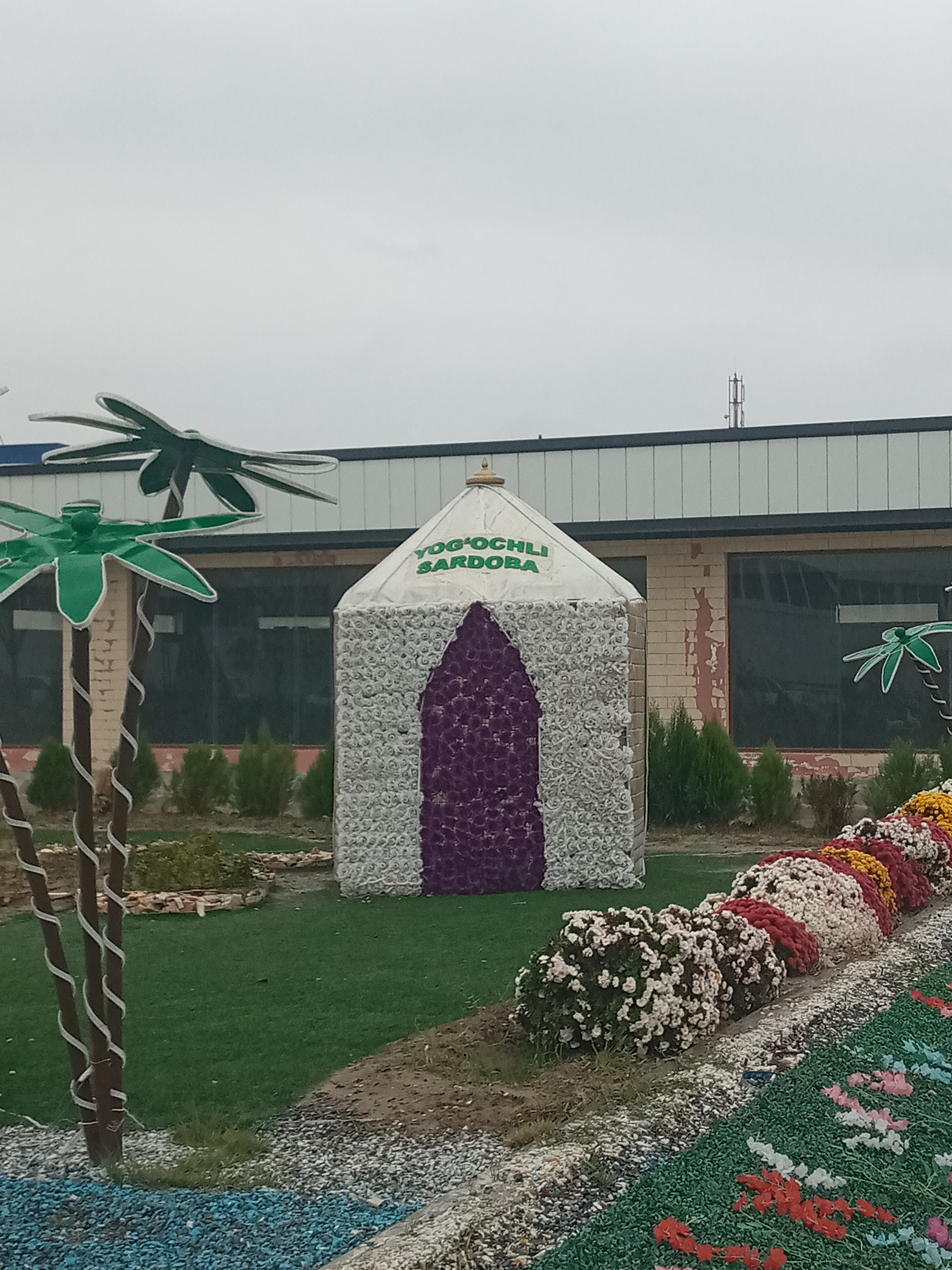

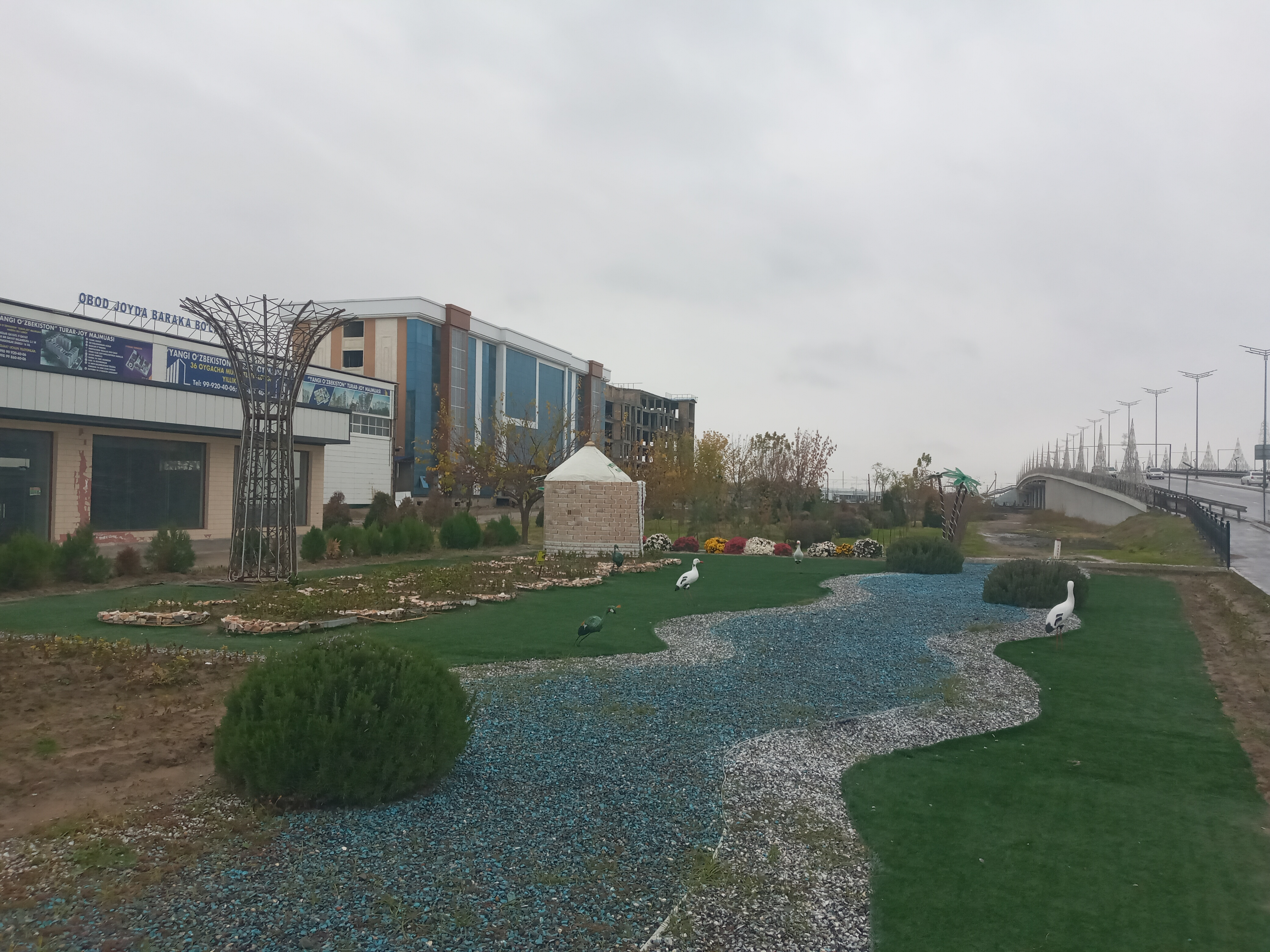
The replica of the Ogʻoch Sardoba in Gulistan city

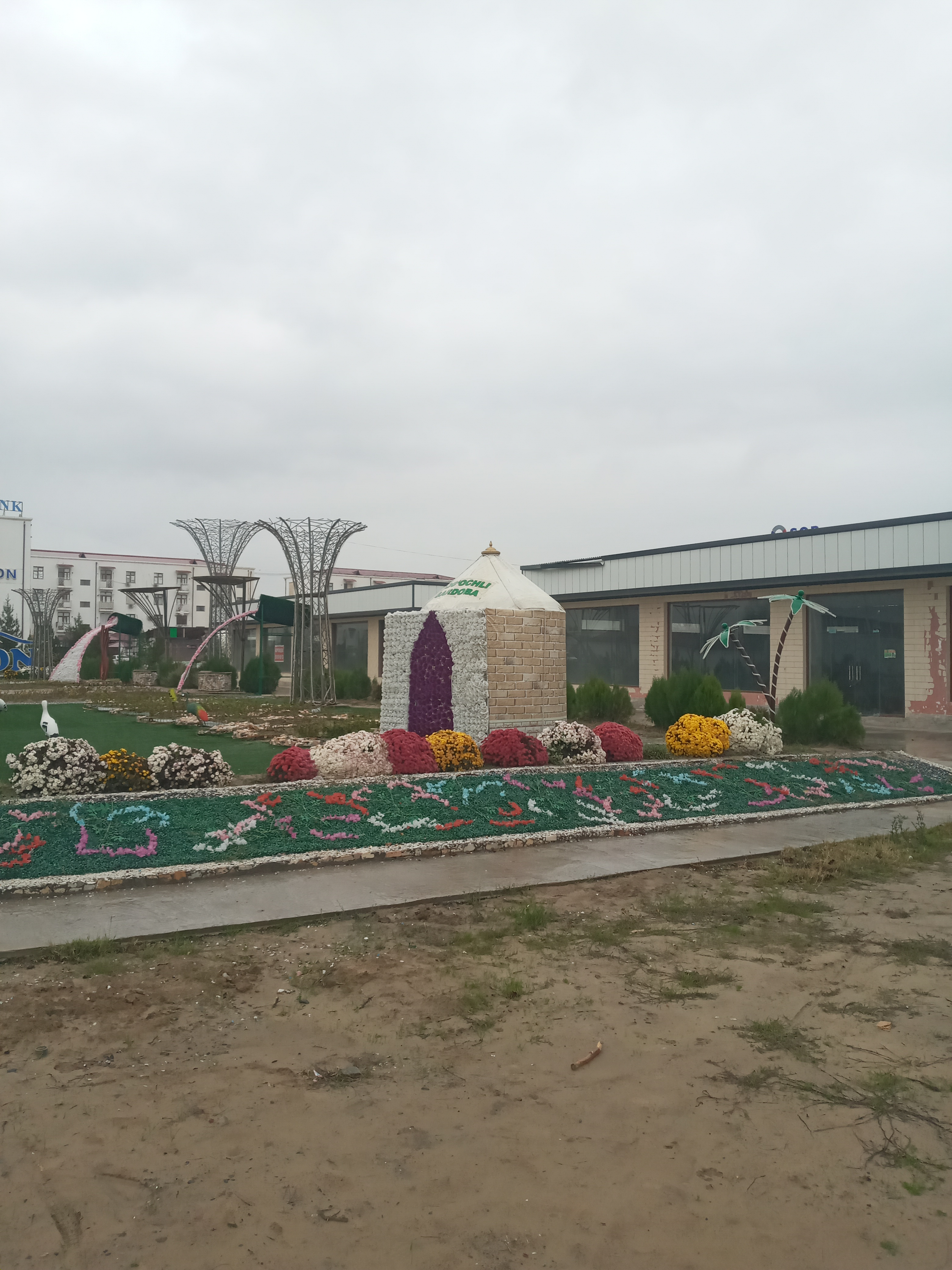

As a result of the rise of saline water around the Ogʻoch Sardoba historical monument, the water in the reservoir has become unsuitable for consumption. It is now one of the four ecotourism objects in Sirdaryo region.

== Architecture ==
The sides of the Ogʻoch Sardoba historical monument are 75 meters square and its total area is 5625 square meters. Two sides and the back part are fenced with 3-meter-high concrete walls, and the front part is fenced with wooden decorated walls.

The Ogʻoch Sardoba historical monument is located in the center of the fenced area. The historical monument is built in a circular shape with a diameter of 27 meters, a height of 8 meters and a porch with a length of 5 meters and a height of 3 meters in the front part.

The entrance to the sardoba is located in the north of the monument. The width of the entrance door is 3 meters, and the height is 2.8 meters. The entrance is arched, and from there wooden stairs lead to the inside of the sardoba.

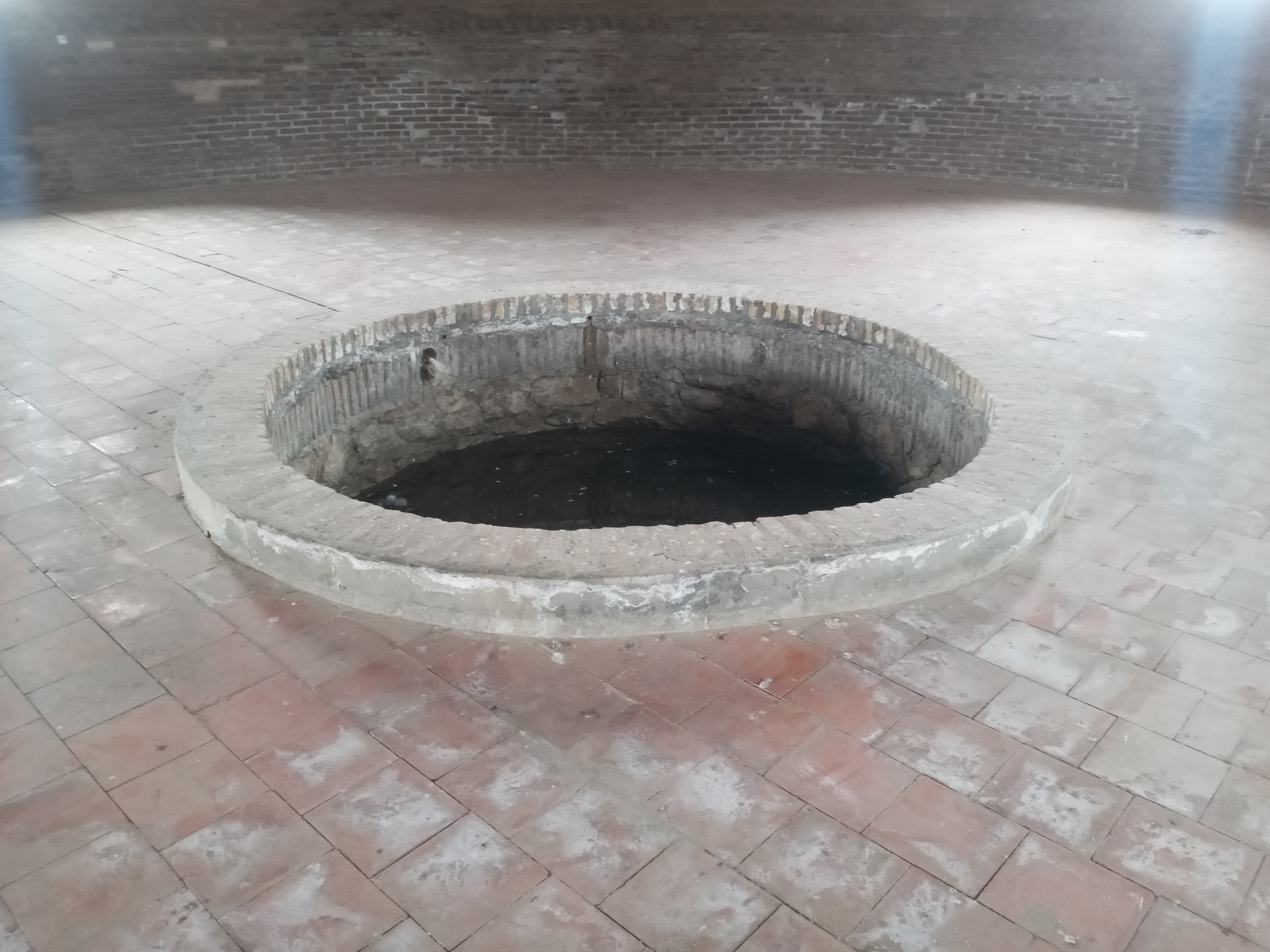
Pool inside Yoʻgochli sardoba

There was a reservoir in the center of the inner part of the Ogʻoch Sardoba historical monument. Its depth was 10—15 meters, and its diameter was 12—16 meters. In its place, a well dug in the 20th century has been preserved. The walls of this well were covered with wood.

The bricks of the monument are square in shape, with a thickness of 5—5.5 centimeters, and a surface of 25, 26 and 27 square centimeters of baked bricks. The thickness of the wall is 1.5 meters at the bottom, and it narrows upwards and becomes one brick thick at the top. The inner diameter of the dome of the monument is 15 meters, and the height is 12 meters. There are several arched ventilation windows or holes on three sides of the dome, 2 meters above the ground, and one spire on top. The spire and windows that refreshed the air kept the air inside the monument clean and cool.

== Legend related to its construction ==
According to a legend, Ogʻoch Sardoba was built by the order of Amir Timur, and the necessary construction materials (bricks and others) were brought from Samarkand by the people who lived nearby, and the sardoba reservoir was filled by the order of Amir Timur, with the help of the Oʻrinboyariq canal that took water from the Syr Darya.

== Gallery ==
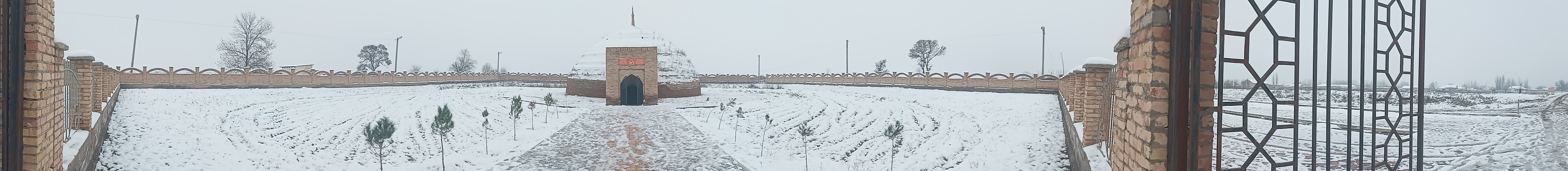
Ogʻoch sardoba area (wide image)
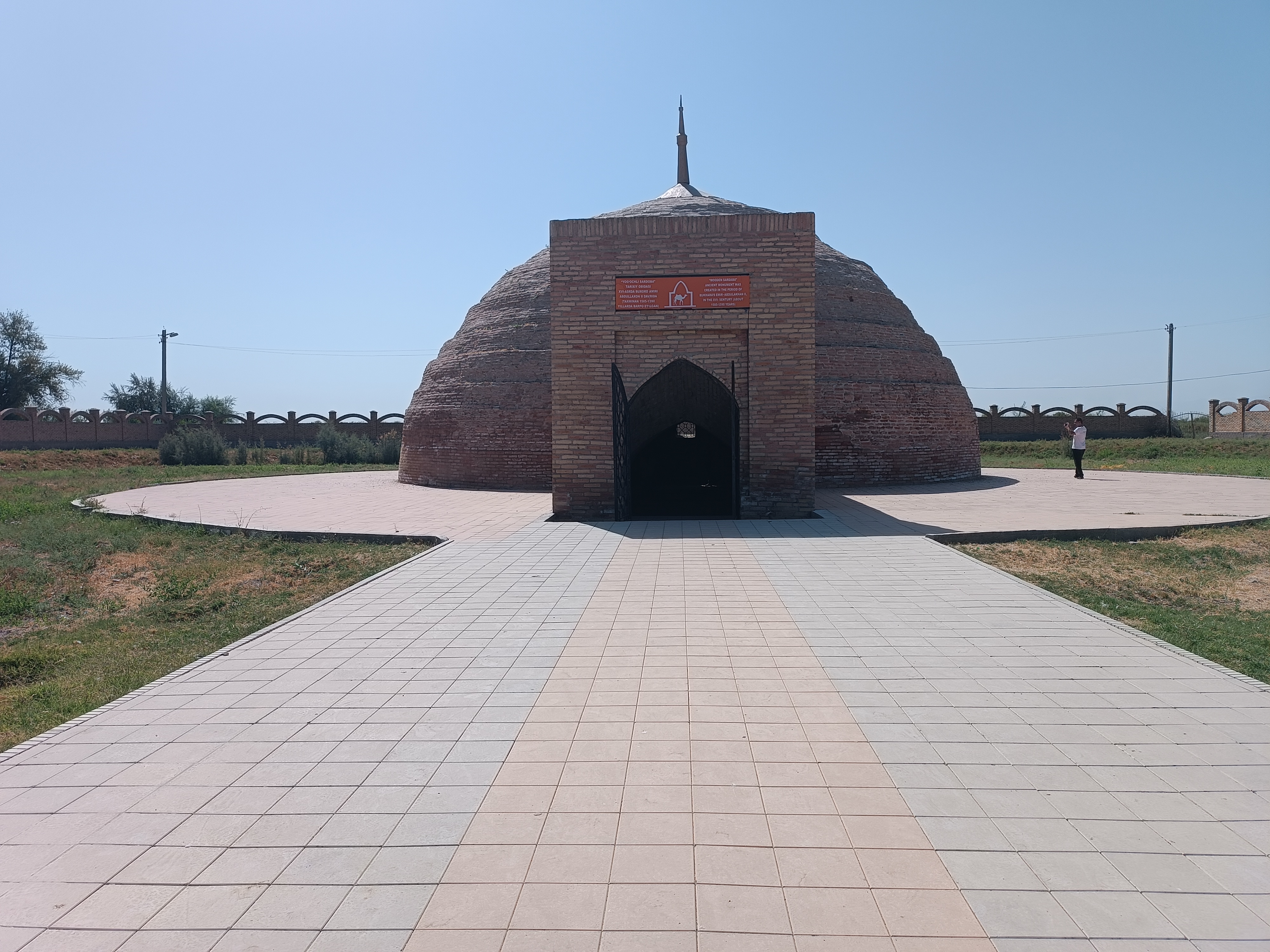
Ogʻoch Sardoba (2023)

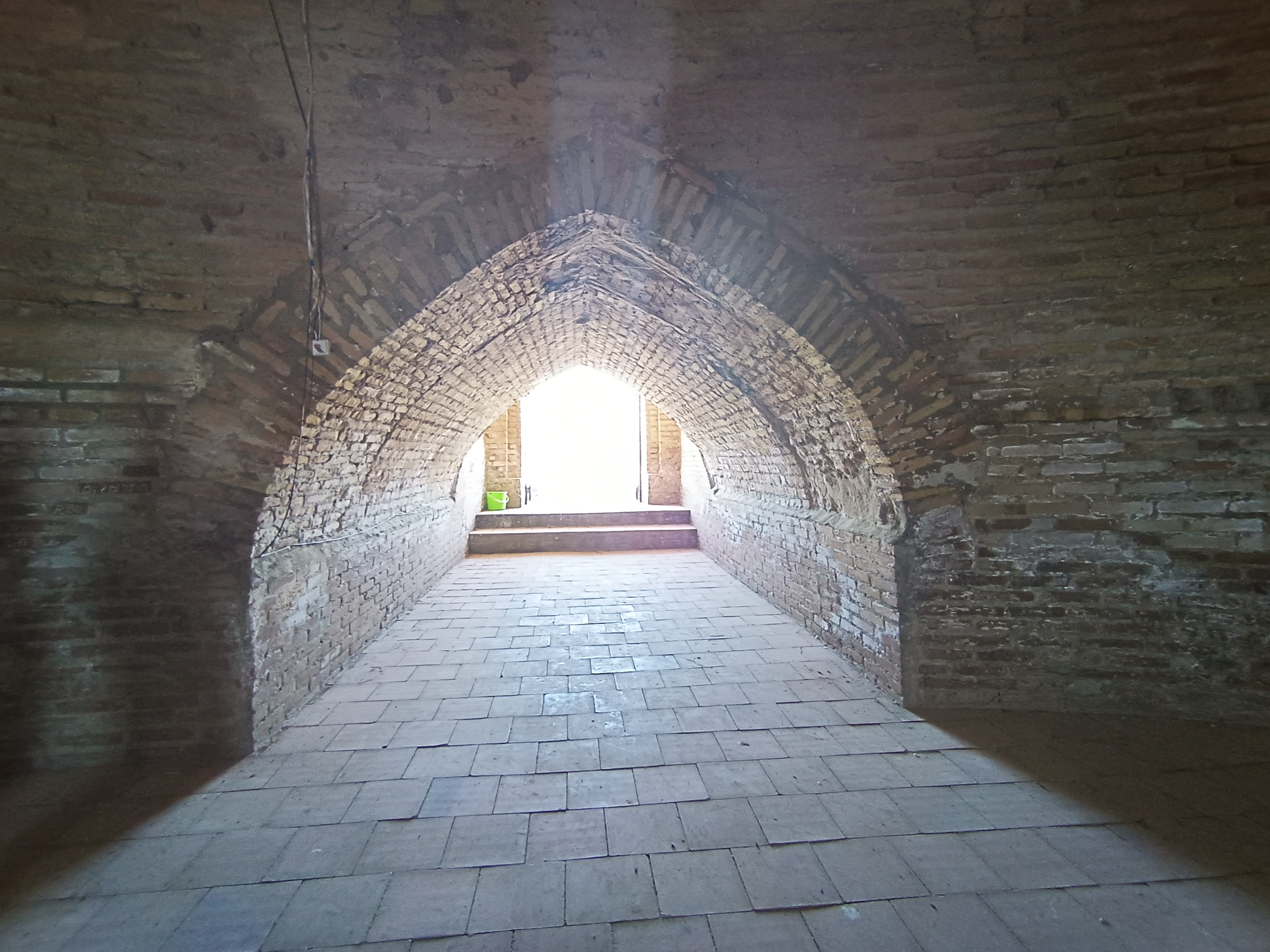
Ogʻoch Sardoba (interior view, 2023)

== Sources ==
- Muhammedov, A.; Begmatov, I. (2014). Suv xoʻjaligi va melioratsiyaga kirish [Access to water management and land reclamation] (in Uzbek).
- Qudratov, S. (2001). Sardobalar oʻlkasi (Sirdaryo qadimda va oʻrta asrlarda) [Land of cisterns (Syr Darya in ancient and medieval times)] (in Uzbek). Tashkent: Fan.
- Shoisoyev, I. K. (2019). "Mirzachoʻl Buyuk ipak yoʻli chorrahasida" [Mirzachol at the crossroads of the Great Silk Road]. Arxitektura. Qurilish. Dizayn. (Architecture. Construction. Design.) (in Uzbek) (3). Tashkent: Toshkent arxitektura-qurilish instituti. Archived from the original on 2023-01-01.
- Shoisoyev, I. K.; Arziyev, D. A. (2019). "Oʻzbekistonda turizm sohasini yanada rivojlantirish masalalari (Sirdaryo viloyati misolida)" [Issues of further development of the tourism sector in Uzbekistan (in the example of Syrdarya region)]. Arxitektura. Qurilish. Dizayn. (in Uzbek) (3). Tashkent: Toshkent arxitektura-qurilish instituti. Archived from the original on 2023-01-01.
- Tobirov, O. (2021). Turizm va uni Sirdaryo viloyatida rivojlanishining geografik jihatari [Tourism and the geographical aspect of its development in the Syrdarya region] (in Uzbek).
