= Howz =

Symmetrical axis pool in Persian architecture

In traditional Persian architecture, a howz (Persian: حوض) is a centrally positioned symmetrical axis pool. If in a traditional house or private courtyard, it is used for bathing, aesthetics or both. If in a sahn of a mosque, it is used for performing ablutions. A howz is usually around 30 centimetres (12 in) deep. It may be used as a "theatre" for people to sit on all sides of the pool while others entertain.

Howz is a feature of the Persian gardens.

== Central Asia ==
In Bukhara, hauz (Uzbek: hovuz) were the city's main source of drinking water until the Soviet period. They were fed by branches of the Shahrud, the city's main canal, and many were linked to one another by open channels or covered underground conduits called tazar. Under the Manghit dynasty, distribution was overseen by a chief mirab, and the canal was cleaned through hashar, compulsory communal labor by residents. The standing water also spread disease, including dracunculiasis (locally rishta) and malaria. In the 1920s and 1930s Soviet authorities gradually filled in most of the pools and replaced them with modern water distribution. The early 17th-century Lab-i Hauz is one of the few that survive.

== Gallery ==
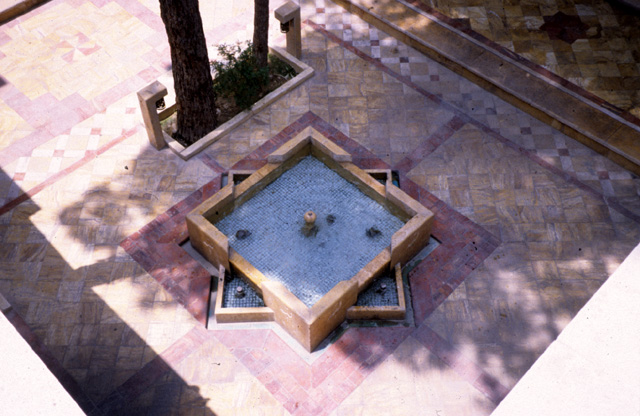
A small howz in a mosque in Tehran shaped in the traditional form of two squares, one rotated 45 degrees

Small howz in Isfahan

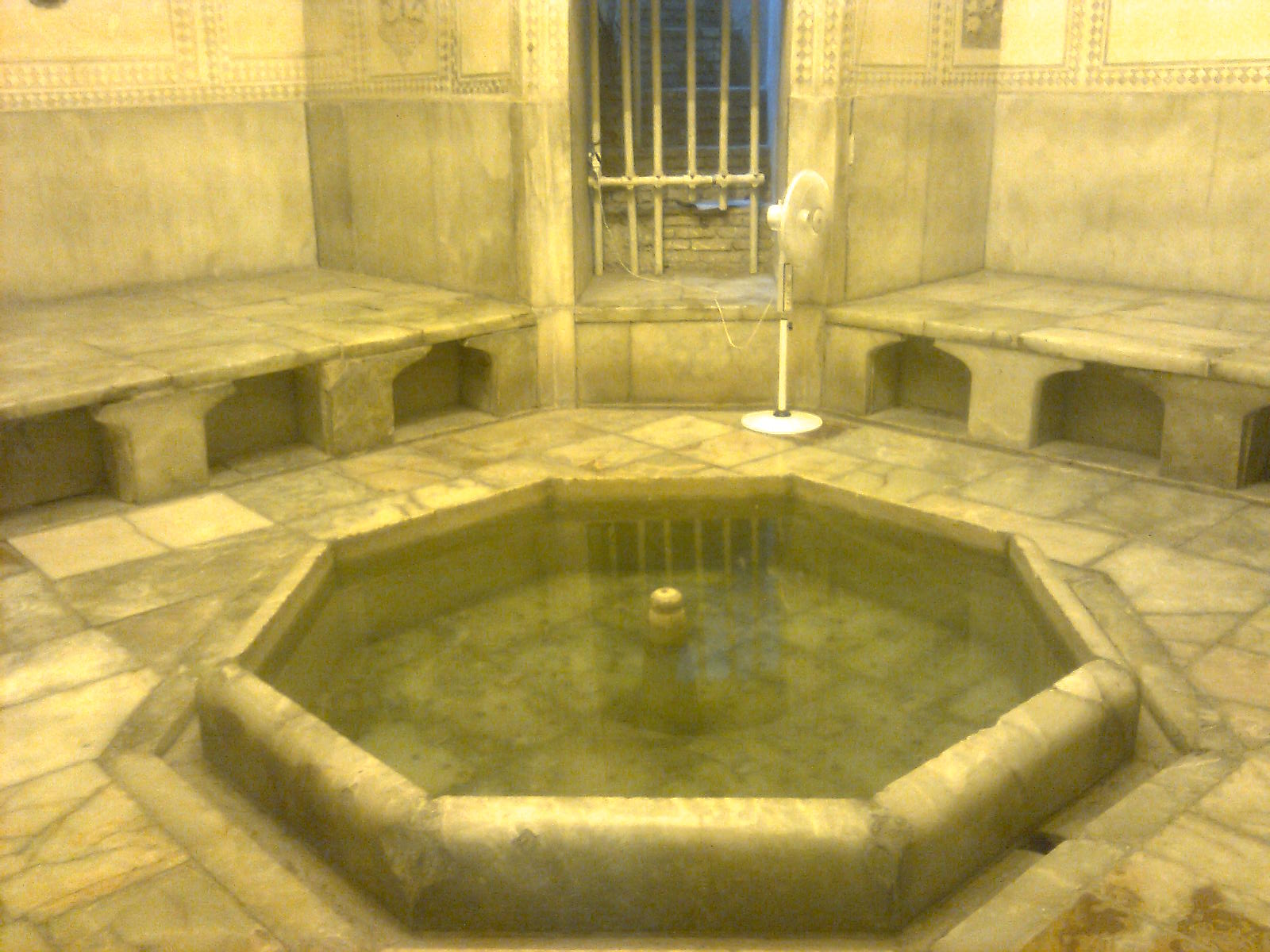
A howz in the historical bath house of Arg of Karim Khan

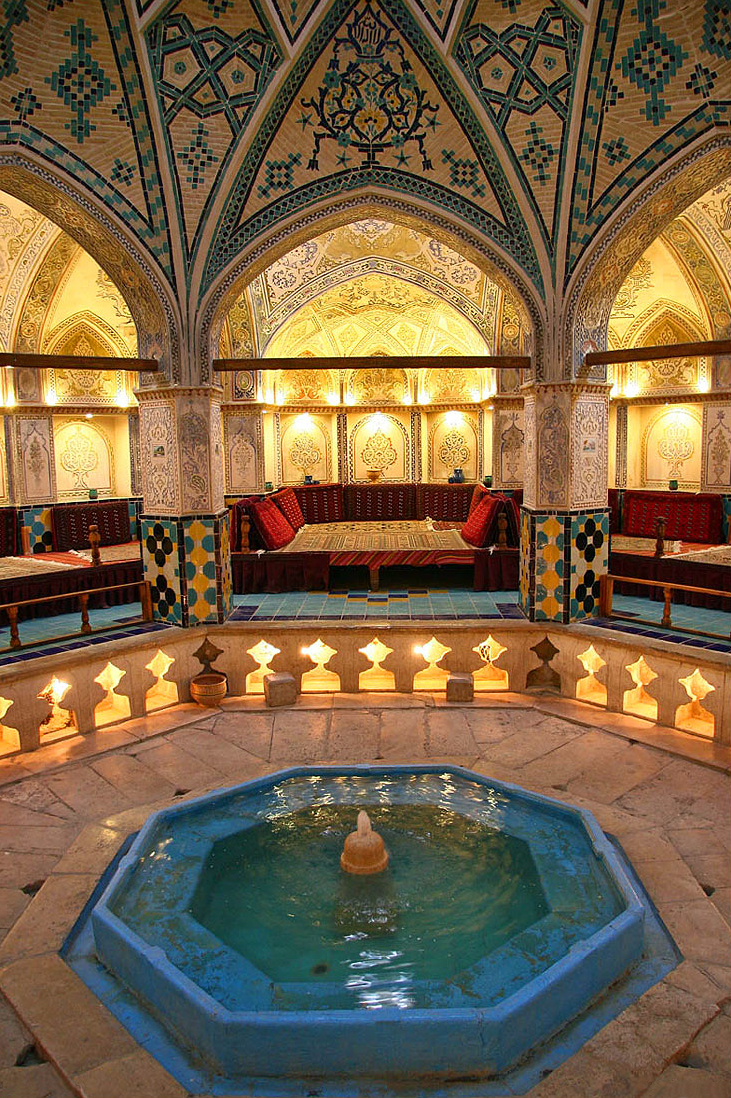
Howz in Soltan Amir Ahmad Bath House, Kashan, Iran

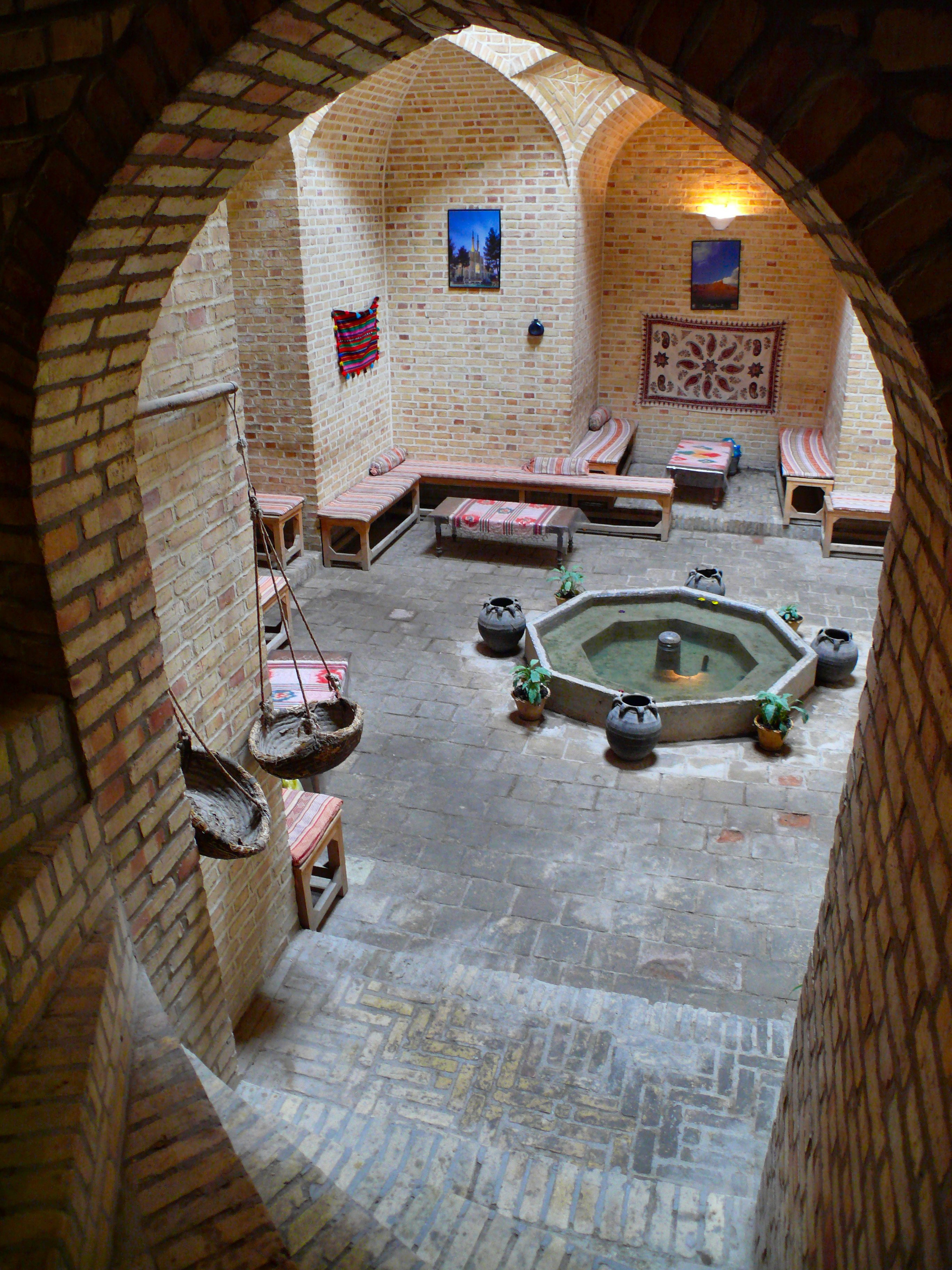
A howz in an historical underground teahouse (chaikhaneh) in Yazd

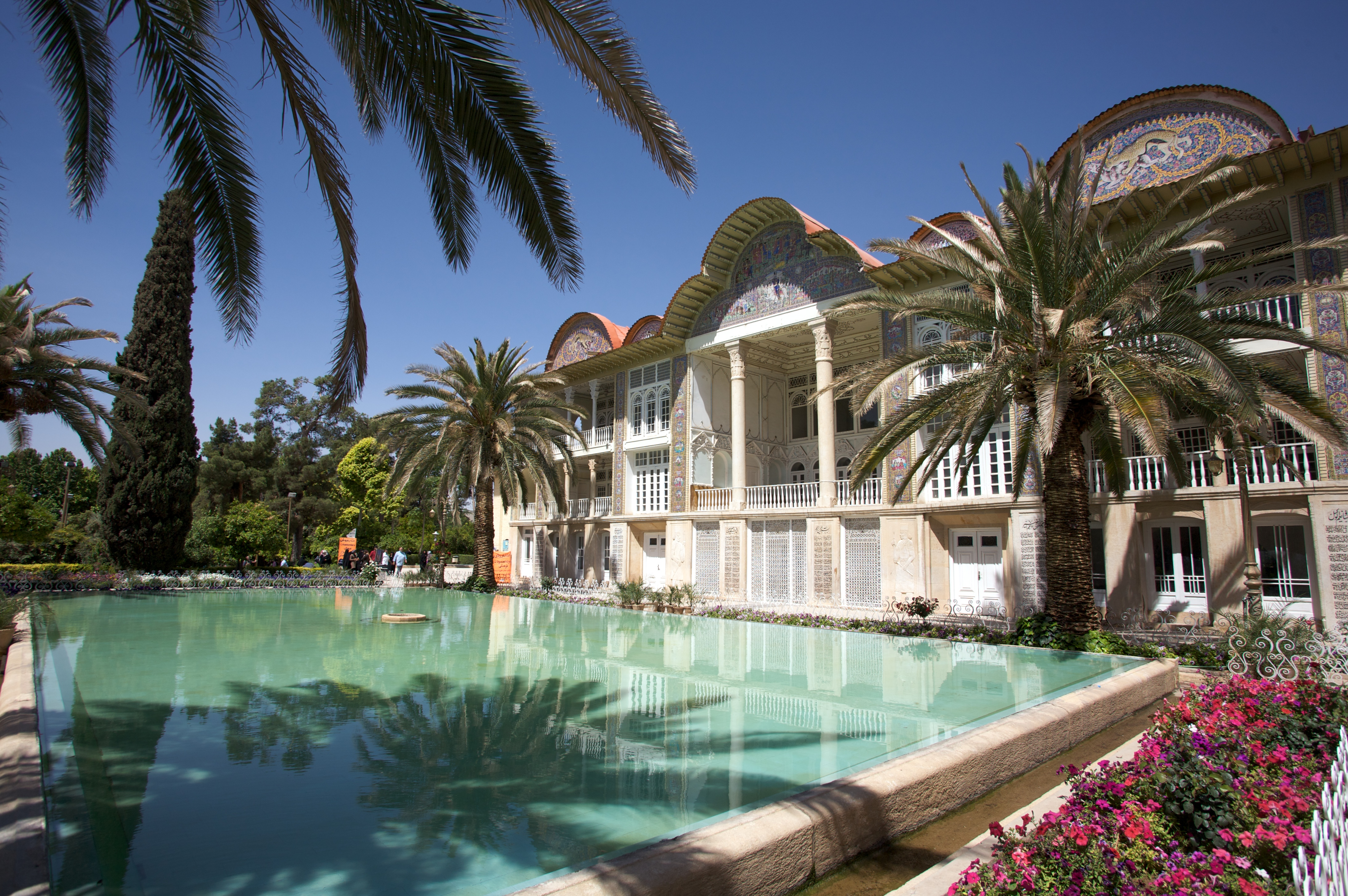
Howz of the Eram Garden

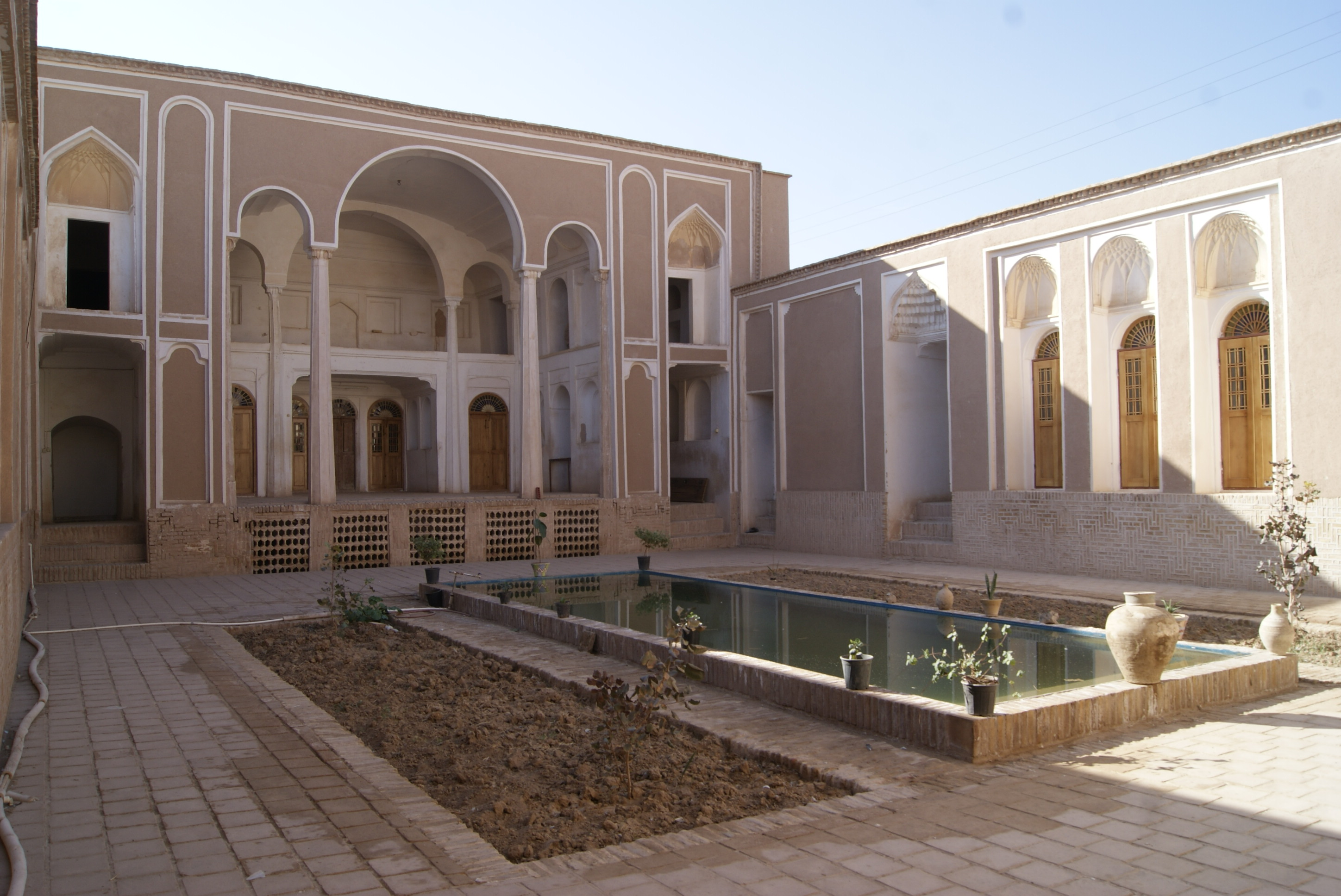
The howz in courtyard of Mostowfi House

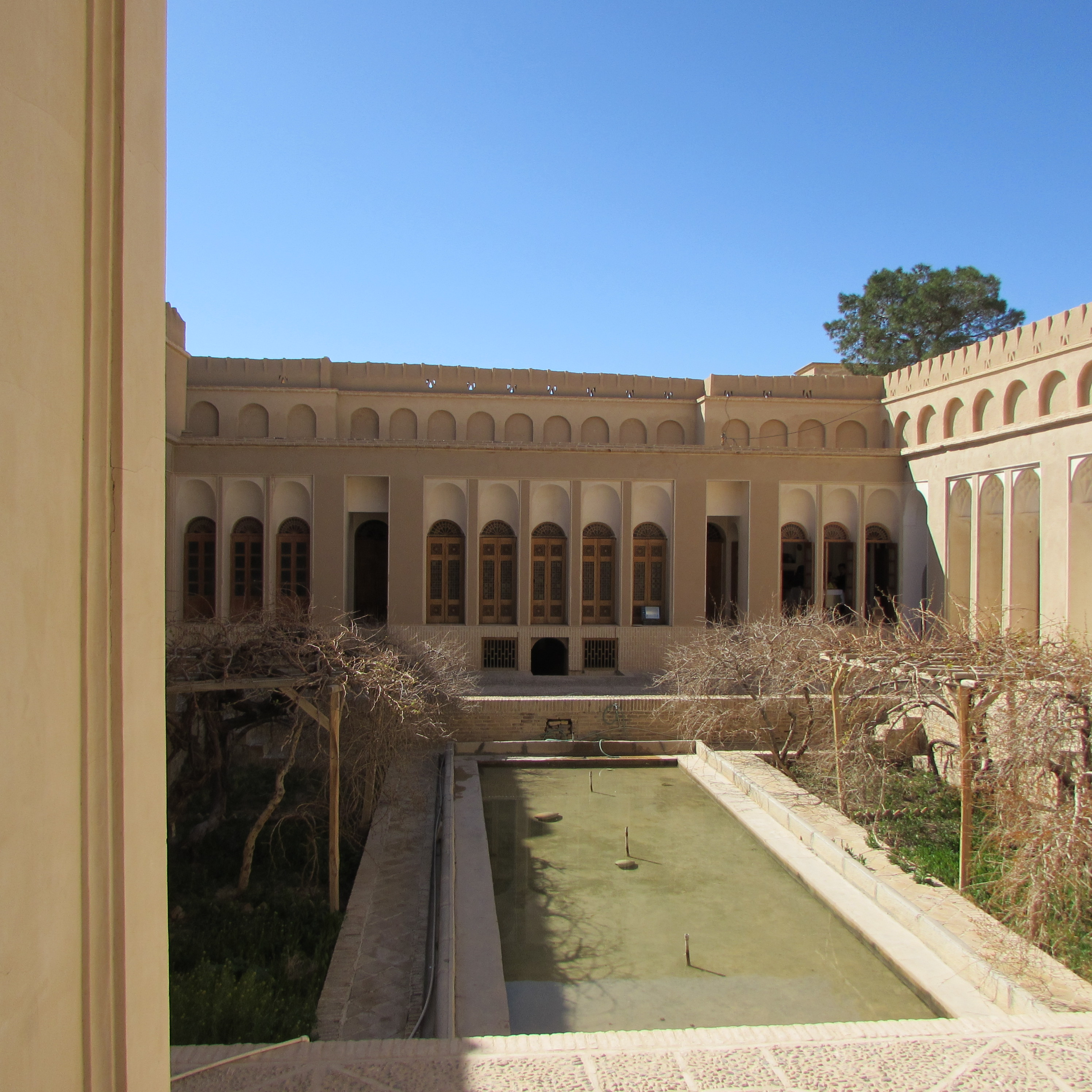
A big rectangular howz in a traditional Iranian house

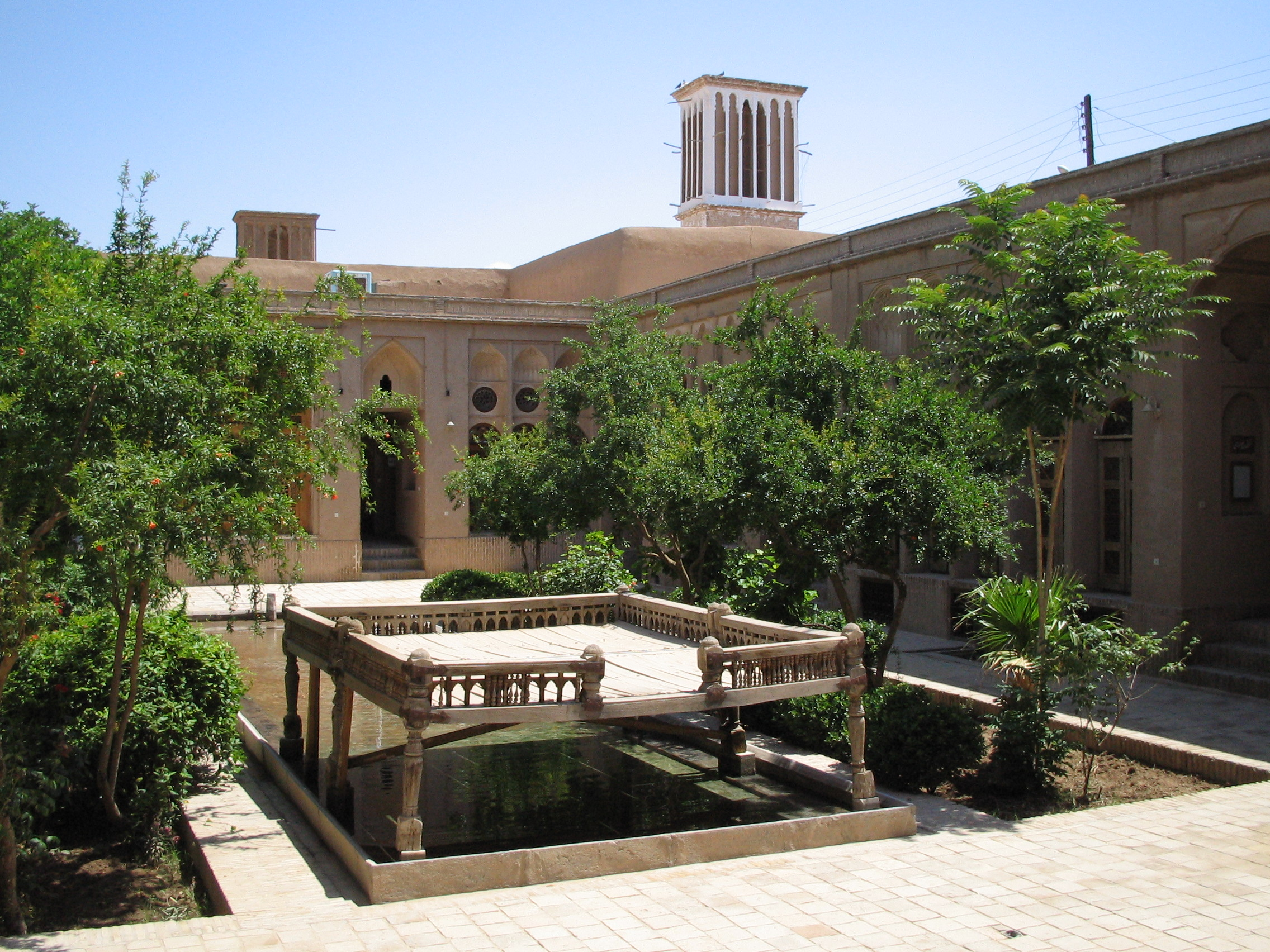
Howz of the Khaneh Lari, Yazd

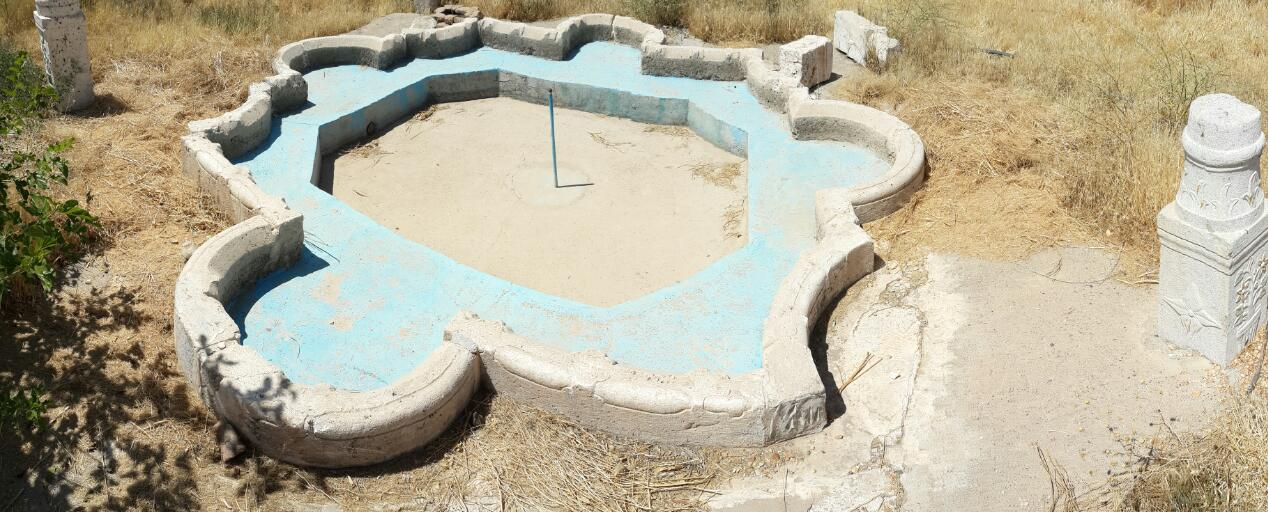
An asymmetrical empty howz

== See also ==
- History of water supply and sanitation
  - Ancient water conservation techniques
  - Water supply and sanitation in the Indus-Saraswati Valley Civilisation
  - Sanitation in ancient Rome
  - Traditional water sources of Persian antiquity
