= Soviet Border Troops =

Armed border guard of the Soviet Union

- Пограничные войска СССР; Pograníchnyye Voiská SSSR
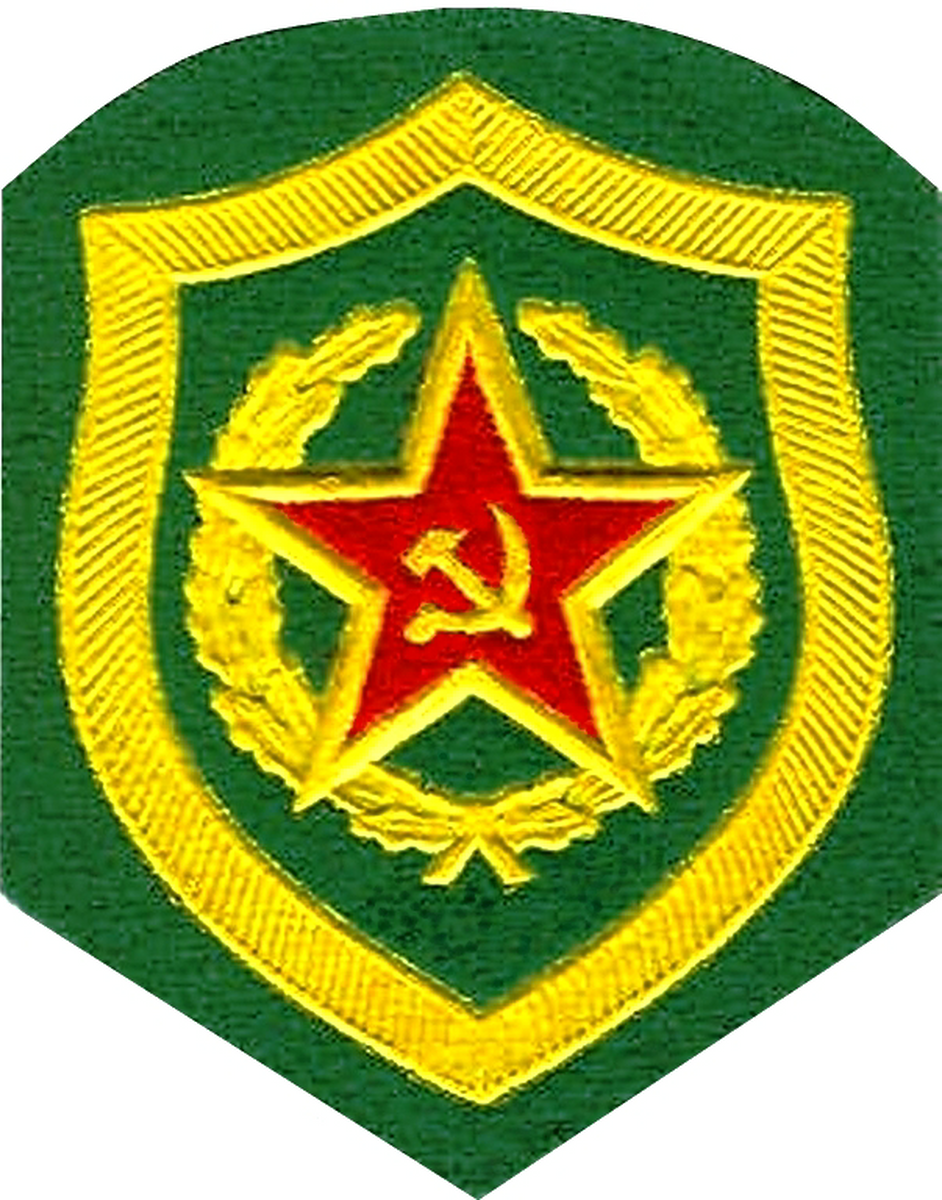
- Patch of the Soviet Border Troops
- Founded: 1918
- Disbanded: 1992
- Country: Russian SFSR (1918–1922); Soviet Union (1922–1991); CIS (1991–1992)
- Type: Border guard
- Size: 220,000 (1991)
- Colors: Green
- Engagements: First World War: Basmachi movement; Operation Faustschlag; Battle of Bakhmach; Crimea Operation (1918); Chinese Civil War: Sino-Soviet conflict (1929); Soviet–Japanese border conflicts: Battle of Lake Khasan; Second World War: Winter War; Operation Barbarossa; Continuation War; Anglo-Soviet invasion of Iran; Soviet-Japanese War; Cold War: Hungarian Revolution of 1956; Sino-Soviet border conflict; Soviet–Afghan War

Commanders
- Current commander: See list
- Notable commanders: Timofei Strokach; Pavel Zyryanov

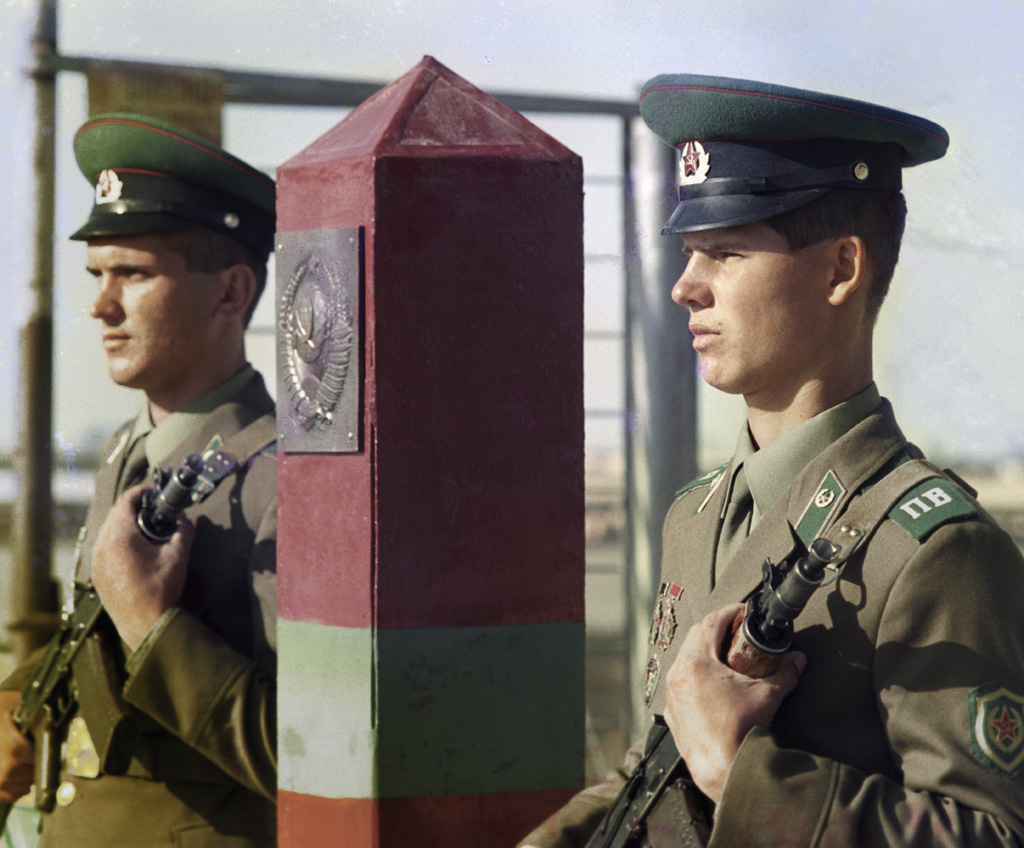
The Karpov frontier post, Soviet-Afghan border

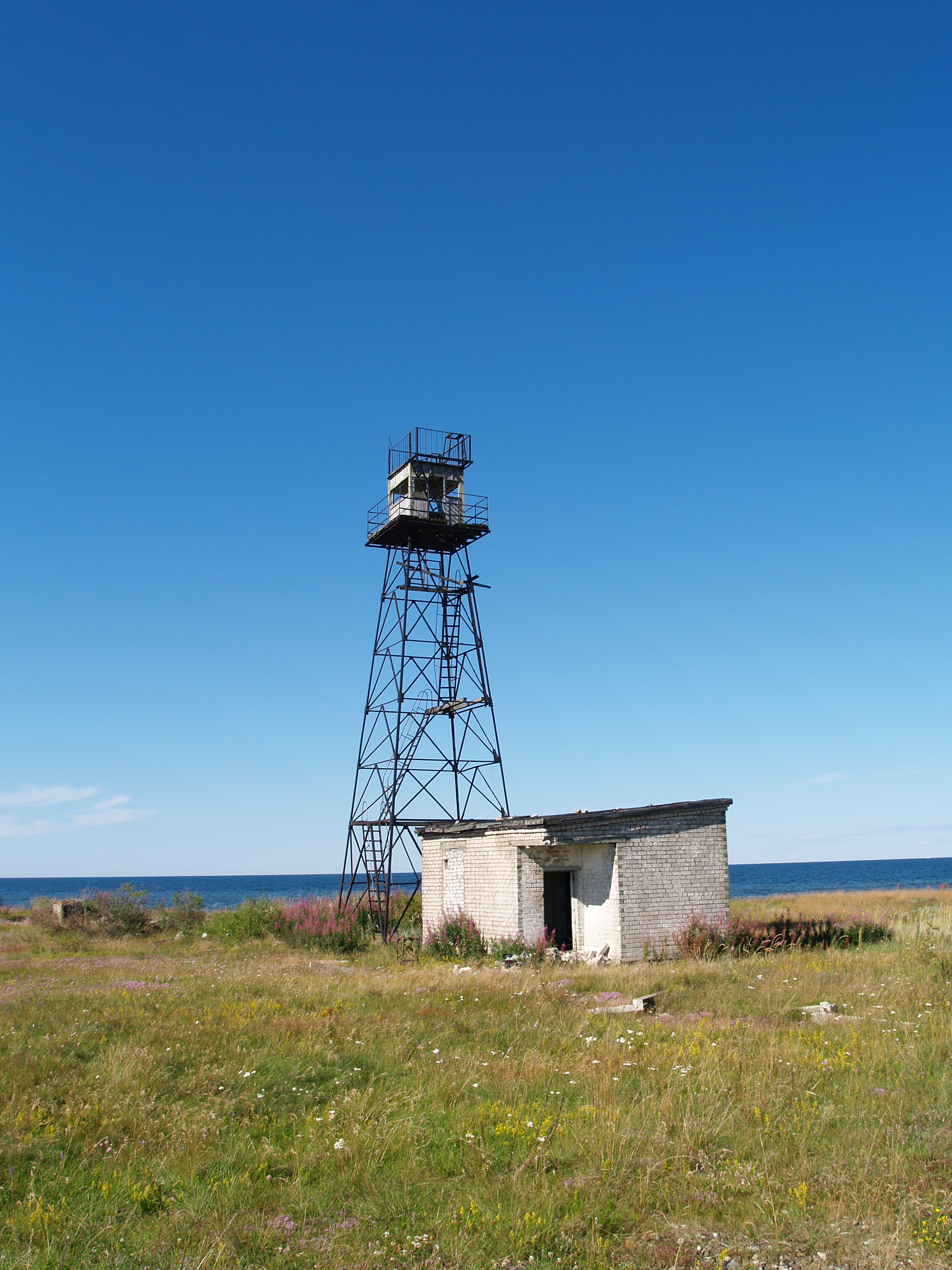
Former Soviet Border Guard observation post in Estonia

The Soviet Border Troops (Russian: Пограничные войска СССР, romanized: Pogranichnyye voyska SSSR) were the border guard of the Soviet Union, subordinated to the Soviet state security agency: first to the Cheka/OGPU, then to NKVD/MGB and, finally, to the KGB. Accordingly, they were known as NKVD Border Security and KGB Border Troops. Unlike the border guards of many other countries, Soviet Border Troops also included the maritime border guarding units, and aviation units (i.e., a coast guard).

The legal status, duties, and rights of the Border Troops were set forth in the Law on the State Border, confirmed by the Supreme Soviet on November 24, 1982. Article 28 defined the basic duties of the Border Troops. The mission of the Border Troops included repulsing armed incursions into Soviet territory; preventing illegal crossings of the border or the transport of weapons, explosives, contraband or subversive literature across the border; monitoring the observance of established procedures at border crossing points; monitoring the observance by Soviet and foreign ships of navigation procedures in Soviet territorial waters; and assisting state agencies in the preservation of natural resources and the protection of the environment from pollution. Border guards were authorized to examine documents and possessions of persons crossing the borders and to confiscate articles; to conduct inquiries in cases of violations of the state border; and to take such actions as arrest, search and interrogation of individuals suspected of border violations.

With the end of the Soviet Union, the Soviet Border troops remained under the command of the Commonwealth of Independent States but later were divided between the Union's constituent republics.

== History ==
=== Tsarist and Imperial Russia ===
One can trace the origin of border services in Russia to 1571 and the work of Prince Mikhail Vorotynsky (died 1573) and his Great Abatis Border built along the southern boundaries of the Tsardom of Russia in the 16th century.

In 1782 the Empress Catherine II of Russia established Border Customs Guard units, originally manned by Russian Cossacks as well as by low-ranking cavalry troops. In 1810 General Mikhail Barklay de Tolly organized numerous border posts along the entire western Russian border, manned by 11 regiments of Don and Bug Cossacks. Within two years Russian Border Guards became the first to oppose Napoleon's invasion of Russia (June 1812). In 1832 Cossacks and cavalry were replaced by armed customs officials subordinate to the Ministry of Finance in peacetime (in wartime the border guards were automatically transferred to the army). In the same year the government of Emperor Nicholas I established a coast guard – originally to observe coasts of the Black Sea and of the Sea of Azov.

Count Sergei Witte, the Russian Minister of Finance (1892–1903) in the government of Alexander III (reigned 1881–1894), reformed the service on 13 October 1893 into the Independent Border Guards Corps (IBGC – a para-military rather than a civilian organization) headed by an army general and reporting directly to the ministry.

In 1906 about 40,000 soldiers and officers served in the IBGC – maintaining the defence of the lengthy Imperial border. They served in 8 division-sized districts as well as in the Saint Petersburg headquarters unit.

=== Russian SFSR and Soviet Union ===
- 29 September 1918 – The headquarters of the hull forces (internal security) VChK (Cheka)
- 1 April 1921 – The Office of troops VChK-GPU
- 1 December 1922 – The headquarters of the troops GPU
- 3 October 1923 – Inspectorate of the GPU-OGPU Troops
- 6 November 1926 – The Directorate of Border Guard Troops OGPU

In July 1934 the People's Commissariat for Internal Affairs, the NKVD, was created. Thus from 10 July 1934, under the NKVD, the protection of the Soviet borders was carried out by the Chief Directorate of Border and Internal Guard (GUPVO). Four years later on 29 September 1938 this became the General Directorate of Border and Interior Troops (GUPVV).

By a Council of People's Commissioner's resolution of February 2, 1939, six separate departments were created within the Main Directorate of Border and Internal Troops within the NKVD of the USSR:

- Chief/Main Directorate of Border Troops (GUPV)
- Main Directorate for the Protection of Railway Facilities
- Main Directorate for the Protection of Particularly Important Industrial Enterprises
- Main Directorate of Convoy Troops (GUKV) – jointly manned by the Red Army and the NKVD
- Main Directorate of Military Support (GUVS)
- Main Military Construction Directorate

Among the border districts formed that year was the Leningrad Border District.

NKVD Border Troops consisted of infantry, cavalry, reconnaissance, naval and aviation units.

Since the 1920s, the distinctive part of Soviet Border Troops uniform was the medium-green colored headgear and insignia. The Russian Empire's Separate Corps of the Border Guard has it distinction since 1893. The color is also present on a maritime Border Troops ensign.

After the Molotov–Ribbentrop Pact, the Border Troops assisted the pacification of the newly acquired Soviet territory adjoining the state border. The mass execution of Romanian civilians known as the Fântâna Albă massacre happened at this time.

=== Second World War ===
On March 8, 1939, by the decree of the Council of People's Commissars of the USSR "On the Reorganization of the Command of Border and Internal Troops," the NKVD border and internal troops were divided. The same day, a reform of the NKVD border troops took place, during which they were disaggregated.

In the northern spring of 1939, 18 directorates of border troops were active within the NKVD districts: Murmansk District; Karelian District; Leningrad District; UPV NKVD Belarusian SSR; UPV NKVD of the Ukrainian SSR; UPV NKVD Crimean ASSR; the Georgian District; the Armenian District; the Azerbaijan District; the Turkmen District; the Central Asian Border District; the Kazakh District; the Buryato-Mongol District; the West Siberian District; the Chita District; the Khabarovsk District, and the UPV NKVD of the Primorsky District.

As of June 1941, the composition of the Border Troops and the naval border guard was:

- 18 border districts;
- 94 border detachments;
- eight separate detachments of border courts;
- 23 separate border commandant's offices;
- 10 separate aviation squadrons;
- two cavalry regiments.

The personnel of the Border Troops and the NKVD Maritime Border Guard amounted to 168,135 people.

The Border Troops and the Maritime Border Guard were equipped with:

- 11 patrol ships;
- 223 patrol boats;
- 180 raid and auxiliary boats (414 units in total);
- and 129 aircraft.

In wartime, the Border Troops fought on the frontline. Border Troops units on the western frontier saw particularly fierce combat in the first weeks of Operation Barbarossa, the German invasion of the USSR, in June–July 1941. They bore the brunt of the initial assault, and suffered high casualty rates. The 17th Frontier Guard Detachment of the Border Troops were among the defenders of the Brest Fortress.

On June 5, 1943, the Krygyz Border District was established.

The Border Troops were involved in all major campaigns of the war. Notably, the 105th, 157th, and 333rd Border Troops regiments (operating like regular army units) took part in the Battle for Berlin in 1945. During and after the war, 150 border guards were awarded the title of the Hero of the Soviet Union and over 13,000 of them were decorated with different orders and medals.

The Soviet border was the longest in the world (from Norway to North Korea) and it compassed harsh terrain and climates; accordingly the Border Troops had significant manpower, an intensive maritime presence, and built up a dense and sophisticated system of field engineering devices.

=== Post-War history ===
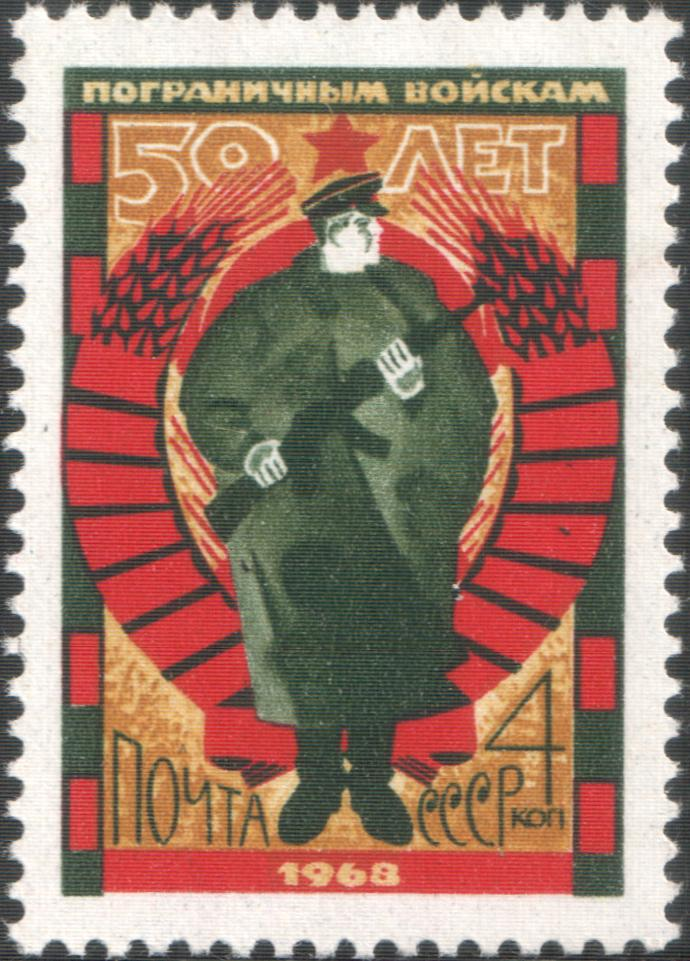
1968 stamp honouring the Border Troops

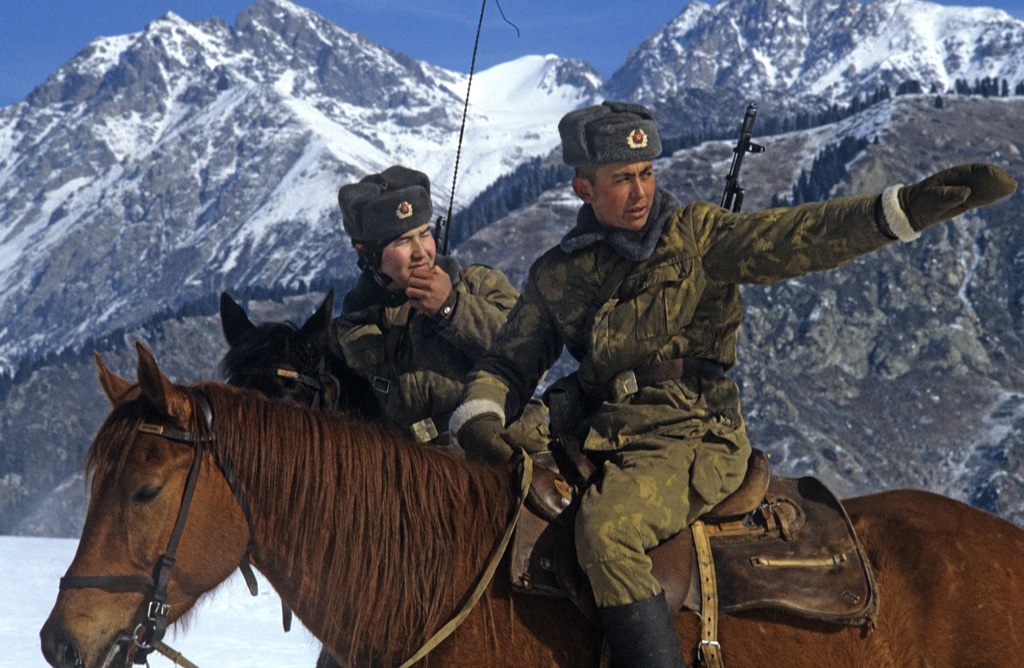
KGB Border Troops wearing the Spetsodezhda at the Khorgos Soviet-Chinese frontier post

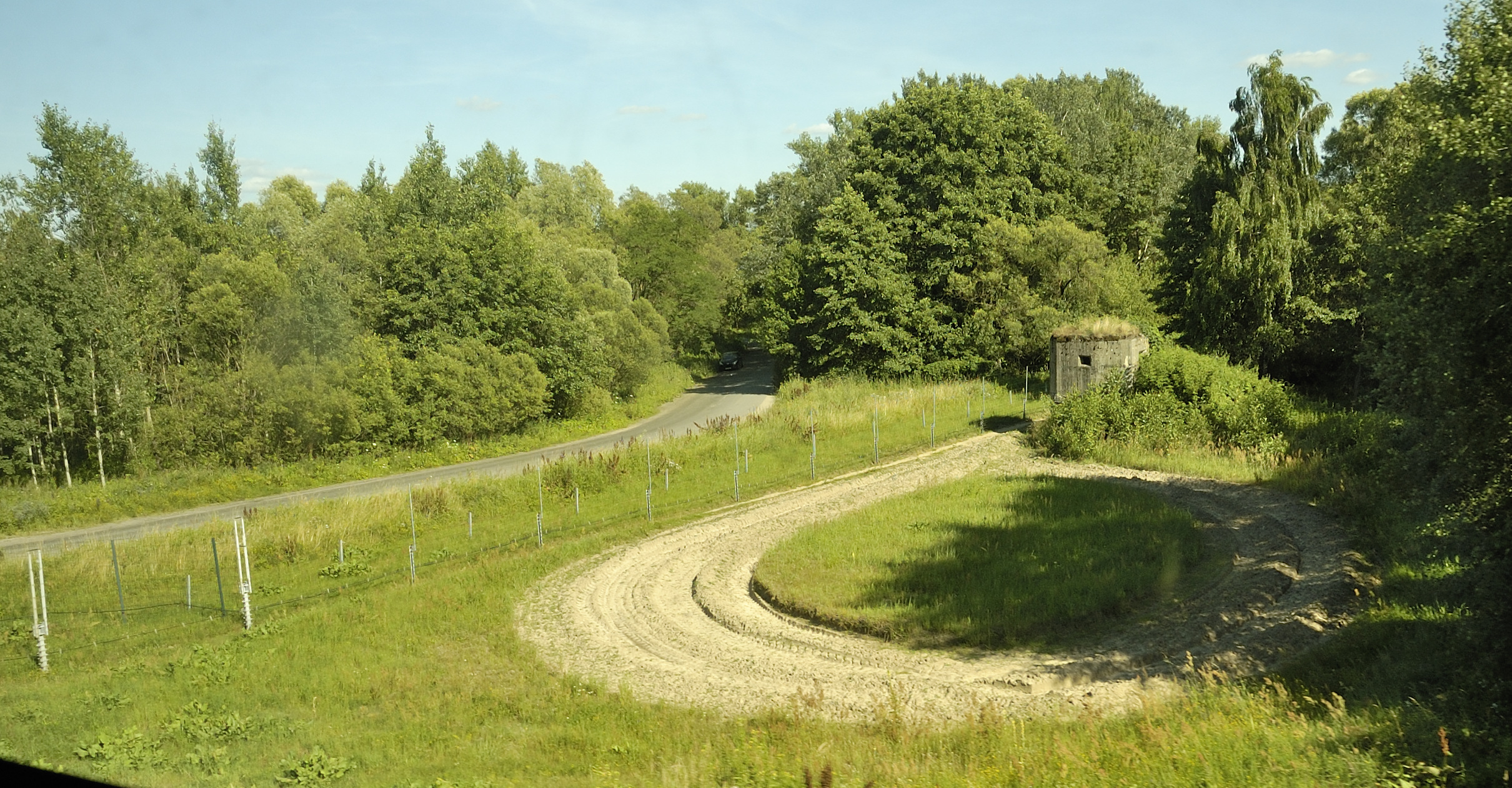
Old Soviet pillbox, security electric fence KS-185 Gobi and trace-control strip at the Belarusian-Polish border between Brest and Terespol.

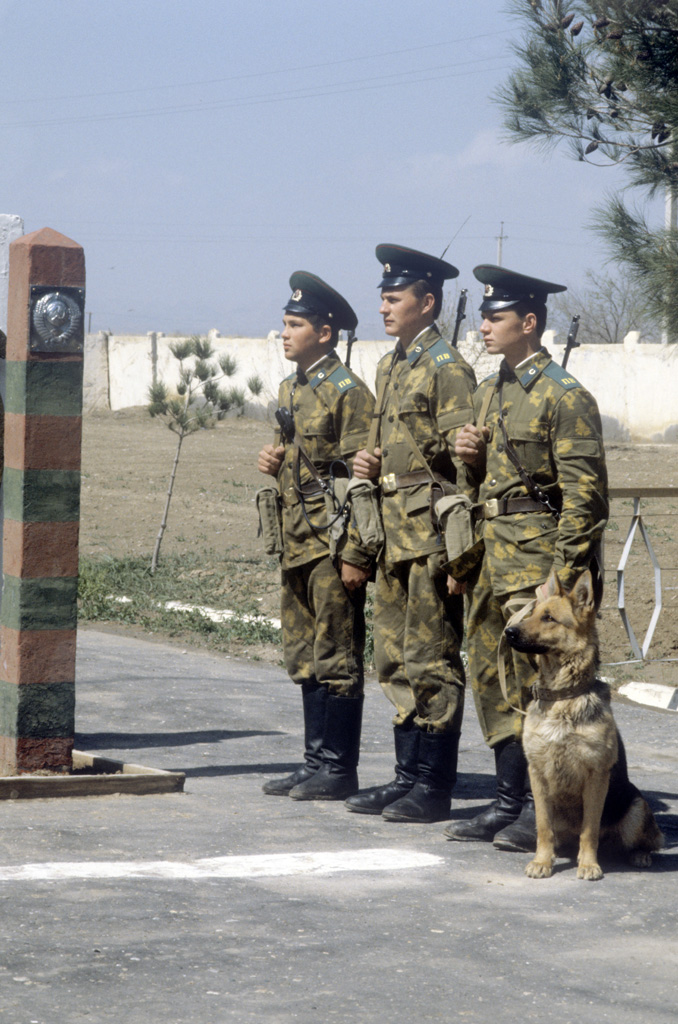
KGB Border Guards ready for patrol.

On October 17, 1949, the border troops were transferred from the Ministry of Internal Affairs, the MVD, to the Ministry of State Security (MGB). The MGB and MVD merged again in 1953, orchestrated by Lavrentiy Beria, who was then arrested and executed. The KGB took on the mantle of the NKGB/MGB and, in 1954, broke off from the reformed MVD.

In 1953 the Krygyz Border District was disestablished, and in 1954, the Kazakh Border District was renamed the Eastern Border District.

- 9 June 1956 – GUPVV USSR Ministry of Internal Affairs
- 2 April 1957 – GUPVV USSR Ministry of Internal Affairs was disbanded in connection with the transfer of the border troops to the KGB.

The Border Troops saw combat in 1969 in border clashes with Chinese soldiers on islands in the Ussuri River.

On October 23, 1975, the Baltic Border District was formed on the basis of the border guard forces of the Northwestern Border Guard District located in the territories of the Estonian SSR, the Latvian SSR, the Lithuanian SSR and the Kaliningrad Oblast.

The Border Guards were involved in the Soviet–Afghan War and a number of them were awarded the Hero of the Soviet Union for their bravery during these conflicts. From the Central Asian Border District, two officers became Heroes of the Soviet Union. On June 28, 1982, Captain Valery Popkov, commander of a Mi-8 helicopter of the 23rd Separate Aviation Regiment of the Central Asian District, was awarded the Hero of the Soviet Union. He had completed over 2,000 combat sorties, flying day and night, in the most difficult weather conditions. Lieutenant Colonel V.I. Ukhabov was also posthumously awarded the title Hero of the Soviet Union on November 10, 1983. On the night of October 11-12, 1983, he personally led a combined combat detachment, which, operating in difficult high-altitude conditions, fought its way through to units repelling attacks by superior enemy forces. At the decisive moment of the battle, he personally led his personnel into the attack and was mortally wounded.

The most notable border control device was the trace-control strip (Russian: контрольно-следовая полоса) - a wide strip of plowed soil to make it apparent where a crossing had occurred.

=== Dissolution and legacy ===
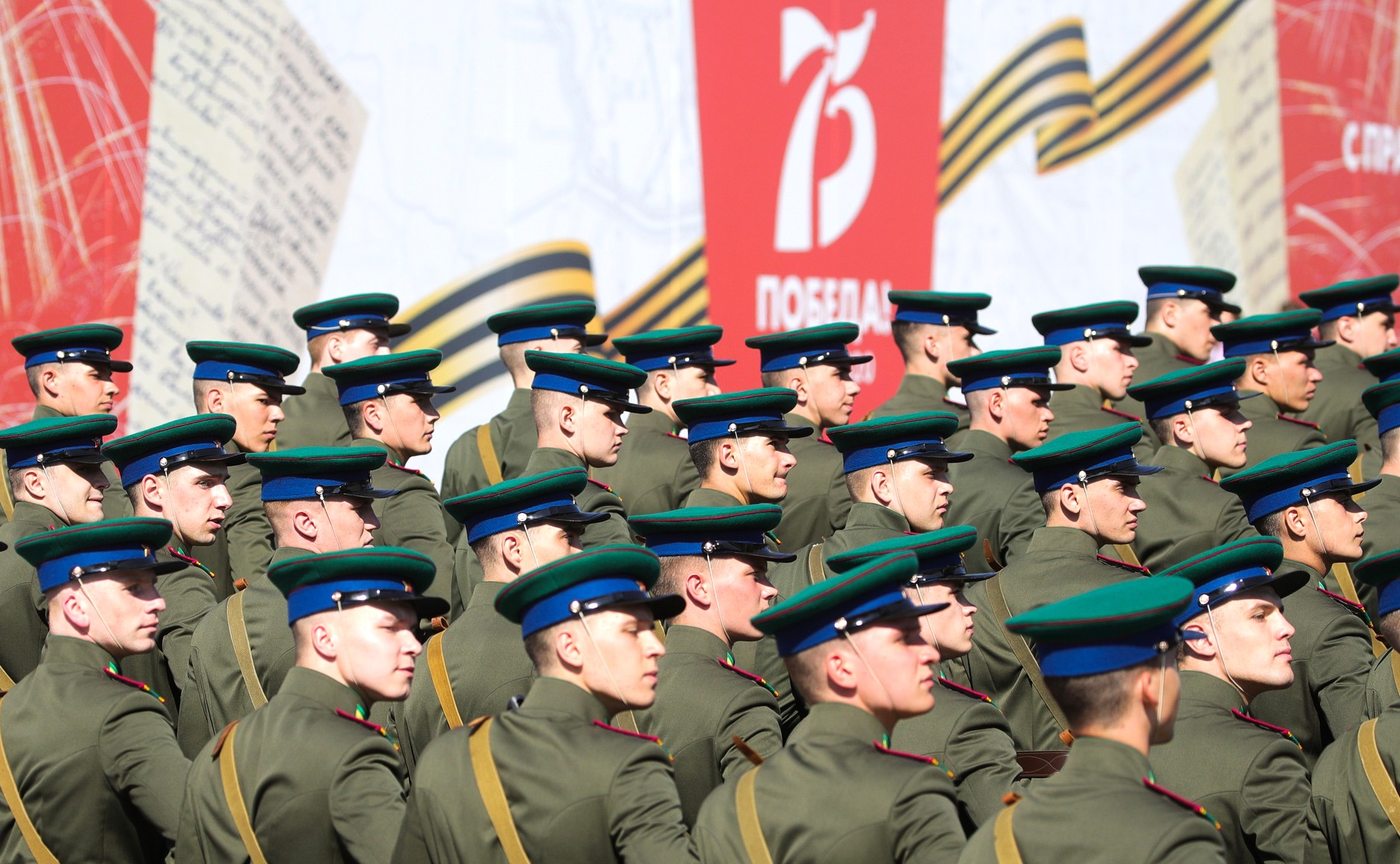
Soviet era border guard reenactors during the 2020 Moscow Victory Day Parade.

With the Dissolution of the Soviet Union, Border Troops formations in most Soviet republics became border guards of the respective independent states.

On August 18, 1992, Eastern Border District units were divided between Kazakhstan and Russia. Most of the district's units and formations became part of the Kazakhstan Border Troops. The Red Banner Baltic Border District was disbanded on 2 September 1992. The border units and activities in the Kaliningrad Oblast were transferred to the Kaliningrad Group of Border Forces. Most of the remaining Border Guard Districts on rUssian soil endured until another reorganisation in 1998.

The new states' border guards mostly changed their name and subordination. Armenia and the new state of Tajikistan were unique exceptions. Tajikistan's border with Afghanistan was guarded by the Border Guard Service of Russia (engaging in heavy fighting) until the late 1990s under a special treaty. Until 2024-25, Armenia's border was still guarded by Russians under similar conditions.

In Russia and some other post-Soviet states, the Border Troops retained some Soviet traditions, most notably the green shoulder boards on their uniforms and "Border Guards Day" (Russian: День пограничника), an official holiday celebrated both by active service and former border guards.

=== Successors ===
- State Border Service of Azerbaijan
- Armenian Border Guard
- Border Guard Service of Belarus
- Border Police of Georgia
- Border Service of Kazakhstan
- State Border Guard Service of Kyrgyzstan
- Moldovan Border Police
- Border Guard Service of Russia
- Tajik Border Troops
- State Border Service of Turkmenistan
- State Border Guard Service of Ukraine
- Border Troops of Uzbekistan

== Personnel, politics, and training ==
Soviet sources repeatedly stressed that a border guard was not only a soldier but also a defender of Soviet ideology. His mission entailed sensitive political tasks, such as detecting subversive literature. To ensure a high level of discipline among personnel of the Border Troops, much attention was devoted to political training and indoctrination. For this purpose, a network of political organs, the Political Directorate of the Border Troops, was established within the Border Troops. It had political departments within all the border districts, detachments, and education institutions, and a network of full-time party political officers worked among all troop units. They conducted political study groups, gave propaganda lectures, and worked to increase the level of combat effectiveness among the troops.

The Border Troops consisted of conscripts drafted by the same system as for the Soviet Army, and a small number of professional enlistees. Officers were trained in specialized academies. Both conscripts and officer candidates for Border Troops were carefully selected and checked by the KGB. This made service in the troops privileged.

Enlisted men were trained with their operational units, whereas officers were trained in special Border Troops schools, such as the Dzerzhinskii Higher Border Command School in Alma-Ata (Kazakh SSR) and the Mossovet Higher Border Command School in Moscow. Military-political officers received training at the Voroshilov Higher Border Military-Political School, founded in the 1930s and located outside Leningrad. In 1972 a higher border military-political school was created in Golytsin, near Moscow. More recently, higher border command faculties were set up at the Frunze Military Academy and the Lenin Military-Political Academy. The period of instruction at the Higher Border Command and Military-Political Schools was four years. Officer candidates, who were screened carefully by their local KGB offices before admittance, took general higher education courses along with specialized military and political studies.

== Border Guard Commanders ==
- Aram Martirosyan, 1940–1942
- Nikolai Stakhanov, 1942–1952
- Pavel Zyryanov, 1952–1956
- Timofey Strokach, 1956–1957
- Pavel Zyryanov, 1957–1972
- Vadim Matrosov, 1972–1989
- Ilya Kalinichenko, 1989–1991

== Famous former members of Soviet Border Troops ==
- Alexander Lukashenko, the President of Belarus, served as an officer,
- Mikhail Saakashvili, the President of Georgia, served as a conscript.
- Vlad Filat, the Prime minister of Moldova, served as a conscript.
- Viktor Yushchenko, the 3rd President of Ukraine, served as a conscript.
- Konstantin Chernenko, the second last Soviet leader (Secretary General of the CPSU) also served as a border guard on the USSR-Chinese border, before becoming more involved in politics.

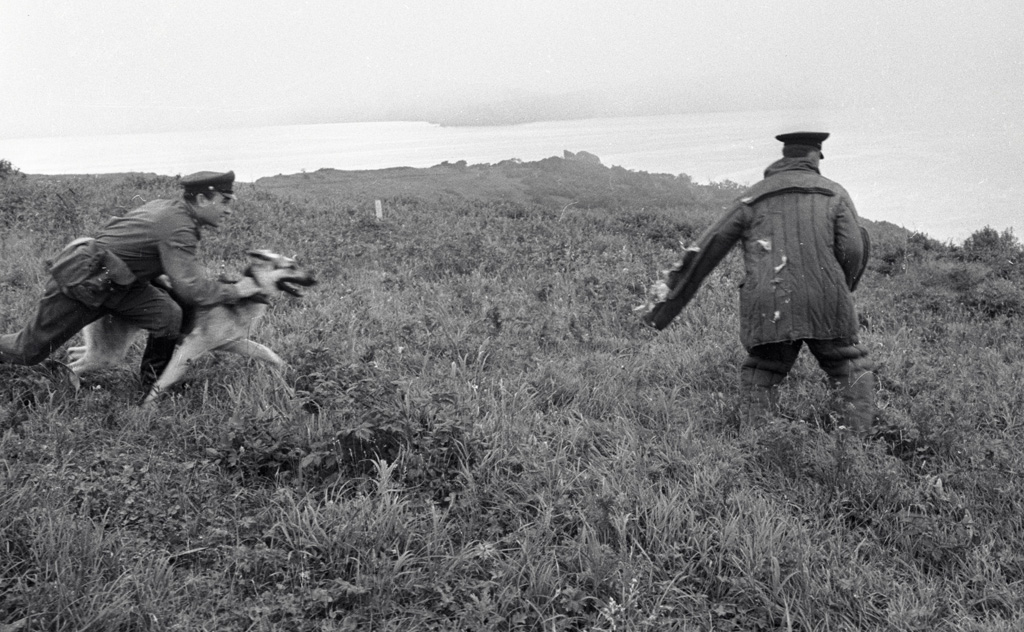
KGB border Troops dog in training exercise

== Structure ==
The Border Troops strength was estimated in 1991 to be 220,000 strong. Although under the operational authority of the KGB, the Border Troops were conscripted as part of the biannual call-up of the Ministry of Defense, and their induction and discharge were regulated by the 1967 Law on Universal Military Service, which covered all armed forces of the Soviet Union.

On top of the Border Troops stood the Main Directorate of the Border Troops (MDBT, Russian: Главное управление пограничных войск), which played a role similar to that of the General Staff for the armed forces. The Main Directorate was subordinated to the First Deputy Chairman of the KGB (the second highest-ranking official in the committee). The Commander of the Border Troops normally held the rank of lieutenant general when he took over the position and later was promoted to Colonel general. Out of the three officers who commanded the troops the second one (Vadim Alexandrovich Matrosov) has reached the rank of Army general at that position. The commander had several Lieutenant generals and Major generals as his deputies. As the Soviet Union dissolved, the Main Directorate administered 10 border districts, which covered the nearly 63,000 kilometers of the state border. The main operating unit of the districts were the detachments (otriady). There were also four separate border detachments, and additional smaller formations and independent units. Border district boundaries were distinct from civil or military district boundaries. At the time of the collapse of the Soviet Union in 1991 the Border Troops included the following operational forces:

=== Main Directorate of the Border Troops ===
Main Directorate of the Border Troops (Главное управление пограничных войск)

- Command (Руководство)
  - Commander - Lieutenant general / Colonel general; Office of the Commander
- Secretariat (Секретариат)
- Staff (Штаб) - Lieutenant general (the Chief of Staff of the BT is simultaneously the First Deputy Commander of the BT)
- Military Political Directorate (Военно-политическое управление) - Major general / Lieutenant general
- Combat Training Directorate (Управление боевой подготовки) - Major general
- Operations Directorate (Оперативное управление) - Lieutenant general
- Naval Directorate (Морское управление) - Rear admiral / Vice admiral
- Engineering Technical Directorate (Инженерно-техническое управление) - Lieutenant general
- Personnel Directorate (Управление кадров) - Major general / Lieutenant general
- Automotive and Armored Fighting Vehicles Department (Отдел автобронетанковой техники) - Major general
- Aviation Department (Авиационный отдел) - Major general of aviation
- Military Construction Department (Военно-строительный отдел) - Major general
- Military Education Establishments Department (Отдел военно-учебных заведений) - Major general / Lieutenant general
- Military Scientific Directorate (Военно-научное управление) - Major general / Lieutenant general
- Military Medical Department (Военно-медицинский отдел) - Major general
- Military Veterinary Service (Военно-ветеринарная служба)
- Financial Department (Финансовый отдел) - Major general
- Rear Services (Тыл ПВ) - Major general / Lieutenant general

Under the Main Directorate was the

==== Border Troops Staff ====
Border Troops Staff (Штаб пограничных войск)

- Chief of Staff / 1st Deputy Commander of the Border Troops - Lieutenant general
  - First Deputy Chief of Staff - Lieutenant general
- 1st Directorate (Operations) (1-е Управление (оперативное)) - Major general / Lieutenant general
- Directorate of Organization and Mobilization (Организационно-мобилизационное управление) - Major general
- 3rd Department (Signals and Warning Systems) (3-й отдел (связи и сигнализации) - Major general
- Department of Information and Analysis (Информационно-аналитический отдел) - Major general
- Directorate of Border-crossing Checkpoints (Управление КПП) - Major general
- Department of Programs in Planning (Отдел программ планирования) - Major general

=== Directly subordinated to the MDBT ===
==== Border Districts ====
The Border Districts were combined arms formations of the KGB, which included border guards similar to motor-rifle infantry, border crossings and their organic aviation units (air regiments, squadrons and flights), signals (battalions and companies), combat engineers, construction engineers (battalions and companies), medical, repair and supply units. The districts bordering oceans and seas also included brigades of guard ships (сторожевые корабли (СКР) - patrol frigates, corvettes and boats, which next to their patrol tasks also had substantial anti-submarine role). The personnel of the Naval Service within the Border Troops held navy style ranks. The Chief of the Naval Directorate within the Main Directorate of the Border Troops was the highest-ranking officer in the service with the rank of Rear admiral / Vice admiral. The Maritime Border Troops of the Border Troops (Ru:Морские части Пограничных Войск КГБ СССР) operated within the twelve-mile limit of Soviet territorial waters. They were equipped with frigates and corvettes, fast patrol boats, hydrofoils, helicopters, and light aircraft. In 1991 the Border Troops numbered ten Border Districts (singular: Пограничный округ, abbr. ПО):

Note: The border districts and their subordinated formations are listed clockwise, starting with the easternmost area of the Soviet Union.

===== Northeastern Border District =====
The Northeastern Border District (Russian: Северо-Восточный пограничный округ) had its headquarters in Petropavlovsk-Kamchatsky. It guarded the easternmost territories of the Soviet Union from Wrangel Island and Mys Shmidta on the Arctic Ocean through the Bering Strait, the coastline of the Chukotka and Kamchatka Peninsulas to the island of Simushir, where it met the Pacific Border District's AOR. The security of the Sea of Okhotsk was also within the tasks of the NEBD and from Simushir its AOR ran in a strait line to the northern tip of Sakhalin and from there it continued to the mainland and the village of Ayan, Russia.

Land units:

- 110th Koenigsbergskiy, awarded the Order of the Red Star Border Detachment (110-й ПОГО) — Anadyr
- 60th Awarded the Order of Lenin and the Order of Alexander Nevsky Vilnius Kuril Islands Border Detachment (60-й ПОГО) — Petropavlovsk-Kamchatsky
- 61st Magadanskiy Border Detachment (61-й ПОГО) — Magadan

Naval units:

- 1st Red Banner Division of Border Guard Ships (1-я КДПСКР) — Petropavlovsk-Kamchatsky
  - 1st Brigade of Border Guard Ships (1-я БрПСКР)
  - 2nd Brigade of Border Guard Ships (2-я БрПСКР)
  - Supply Ships Battalion (ДнКО) (some sources list the battalion (divizyon (дивизион)) as a unit of the 1st Brigade)

Air units:

- 15th Separate Aviation Regiment (15-й ОАП) — Petropavlovsk-Kamchatsky – Yelizovo Airport (helicopters detached to Yelizovo – Khalakhtyrka Airfield)
  - Detachment at Klyuchi-1 Air Base
- 21st Separate Aviation Squadron (21-я ОАЭ) — Magadan – Sokol Airport
  - Forward Operating Location at Okhotsk
- 7th Separate Aviation Squadron (7-я ОАЭ) — Providence Bay Airfield
  - Forward Operating Locations at Anadyr Airport, Mys Shmidta Airport, Cape Dezhnev, Vankarem, Kresta Bay, Saint Lawrence Bay and Egvekinot

===== Red Banner Pacific Border District =====
The Red Banner Pacific Border District (Russian: Краснознамённый Тихоокеанский пограничный округ) had its headquarters in Vladivostok. It guarded the coastline of the larger southern Kuril Islands from Simushir to Kunashir, through the southern tip of Sakhalin it reached the Asian mainland at the border between the Khabarovsk Krai and Primorsky Krai. From there the district's AOR followed the coastline, the border with North Korea and the border with China to the place where the territory of the Primorsky Krai met the territory of the Khabarovsk Krai and the AOR of the Red Banner Far Eastern Border District.

Land units:

- 114th Rushtukskiy, Awarded the Order of Bogdan Khmelnitsky (2nd grade) Border Detachment (114-й ПОГО) — Goryachiy Plyazh, Kunashir, Kuril Islands
- 52nd Sakhalinskiy Rizhskiy, Awarded the Order of Lenin Border Detachment (52-й ПОГО) — Yuzhno-Sakhalinsk, Sakhalin
- 62nd Nakhodkinskiy Sea Border Detachment (62-й МПОГО) — Nakhodka
- 59th Khasanskiy Red Banner and awarded the Order of Kutuzov (2nd grade) Border Detachment (59-й ПОГО) — Posyet

  - 1st Border outpost "Mramornaya"
  - 2nd Border outpost "named after Ovchinnikov"
  - 3rd Border outpost "Sinny Utyos"
  - 4th Border outpost "Slavyanka land"
  - 5th Border outpost "Ryazanovka"
  - 6th Border outpost "Shkolnaya"
  - 7th Border outpost "Ugolovaya"
  - 8th Border outpost "Verkhnya"
  - 9th Border outpost "named after Krainov"
  - 10th Border outpost "Ugolnaya"
  - 11th Border outpost "Utinaya"
  - 12th Border outpost "Zareche"
  - 13th Border outpost "named after A. E. Makhalin"
  - 14th Border outpost "named after P.F. Tereshkin"
  - 15th Border outpost "Pesechanaya"
  - 16th Border outpost "Zarubino"
  - 17th Border outpost "Slavyanka sea"
  - 18th Border outpost "Barabash"
  - 19th Border outpost "Kraskino"
  - 20th Border outpost "Checkpoint Khasan"
  - 21st Border outpost "Posyet Checkpoint"
- 58th Grodekovskiy Red Banner and awarded the Order of Kutuzov (2nd grade) Border Detachment (58-й ПОГО) — Pogranichny
- 69th Kamen-Rybolovskiy Red Banner Border Detachment (69-й ПОГО) — Kamen-Rybolov
- 57th Ussuriyskiy Red Banner and awarded the Order of the Red Banner of Labour, "V. R. Menzhinsky" Border Detachment (57-й ПОГО) — Dalnerechensk
- 12th Training Border Detachment (12-й УПОГО) — Perevoznaya
- Vladivostok Border Entry Seaport (Владивостокский МПП) — Vladivostok
- Separate Border-crossing Checkpoint «Nakhodka» (ОКПП «Находка»)
- Separate Border-crossing Checkpoint «Vladivostok» (ОКПП «Владивосток»)

Naval units:

- 8th Awarded the Order of the Red Star Separate Brigade of Border Guard Ships (8-я ОБрПСКР) — Malokurilskoye, Shikotan, Kuril Islands
- 9th Separate Brigade of Border Guard Ships (9-я ОБрПСКР) — Korsakov, Sakhalin
- 19th Separate Brigade of Border Guard Ships (19-я ОБрПСКР) — Nevelsk, Sakhalin
- 16th Sakhalinskaya Red Banner Separate Brigade of Border Guard Ships (16-я ОБрПСКР) — Nakhodka
- 10th Separate Brigade of Border Guard Ships (10-я ОБрПСКР) — Vladivostok
- 15th Separate Brigade of Border Guard Ships (15-я ОБрПСКР) — Dalnerechensk [river patrol]

Air units:

- 11th Separate Aviation Regiment (11-й ОАП) — Vladivostok – Knevichi Airport
  - Detachment at Sovetskaya Gavan Airfield
  - Forward Operating Locations at Dalnerechensk, Kamen-Rybolov, Spassk-Dalny Airfield and Pogranichny
- 16th Separate Aviation Regiment (16-й ОАП) — Yuzhno-Sakhalinsk – Khomutovo Airport
  - Detachment at Yuzhno-Kurilsk Mendeleyevo Airport

===== Red Banner Far Eastern Border District =====
The Red Banner Far Eastern Border District (Russian: Краснознамённый Дальневосточный пограничный округ) had its headquarters in Khabarovsk. It guarded the Chinese border in the Amur Oblast from the Primorsky Krai to the Zabaykalsky Krai where it met the AOR of the Red Banner Trans-Baikal Border District.

Land units:

- 77th Bikinskiy Red Banner Border Detachment (77-й ПОГО) — Bikin, Khabarovsk Krai
- 70th Kazakevichevskiy Red Banner Border Detachment (70-й ПОГО) — Kazakevichevo, Khabarovsk Krai
- 63rd Birobidzhanskiy Border Detachment (63-й ПОГО) — Birobidzhan, Jewish Autonomous Oblast
- 75th Raychikhinskiy Red Banner Border Detachment (75-й ПОГО) — Raychikhinsk, Amur Oblast
- 56th Blagoveshchenskiy Red Banner Border Detachment (56-й ПОГО) — Blagoveshchensk, Amur Oblast
- 78-й Shimanovskiy, Awarded the Order of Alexander Nevsky Border Detachment (78-й ПОГО) — Shimanovsk, Amur Oblast
- 55-й Skovorodinskiy, Awarded the Order of the Red Star Border Detachment (55-й ПОГО) — Skovorodino, Amur Oblast
- Separate Border-crossing Checkpoint «Nikolayevsk-on-Amur» (ОКПП «Николаевск-на-Амуре»)

Naval units:

- 14th Separate Brigade of Border Guard Ships (14-я ОБрПСКР) — Kazakevichevo, Khabarovsk Krai [river patrol]
- 13th Separate Brigade of Border Guard Ships (13-я ОБрПСКР) — Leninskoye, Jewish Autonomous Oblast [river patrol]
- 12th Separate Brigade of Border Guard Ships (12-я ОБрПСКР) — Blagoveshchensk [river patrol]
- 11th Separate Brigade of Border Guard Ships (11-я ОБрПСКР) — Dzhalinda [river patrol]

Air units:

- 16th Separate Aviation Squadron (16-я ОАЭ) — Khabarovsk Airport
- 19th Separate Aviation Squadron (19-я ОАЭ) — Blagoveshchensk Airfield

===== Red Banner Trans-Baikal Border District =====
The Red Banner Trans-Baikal Border District (Russian: Краснознамённый Забайкальский пограничный округ) had its headquarters in Chita, Zabaykalsky Krai. It guarded the eastern part of the Soviet-Chinese border from the Amur Oblast to Mongolia and the Mongol-Soviet border. At the Chinese-Mongol-Soviet border three-point in the Gorno-Altai Autonomous Oblast near Khüiten Peak its AOR met the AOR of the Red Banner Eastern Border District.

Land units:

- 74th Sretenskiy Red Banner Border Detachment (74-й ПОГО) — Kokuy, Chita Oblast
- 54th Priargunskiy Red Banner Border Detachment (54-й ПОГО) — Priargunsk, Chita Oblast
- 53rd Khinganskiy Red Banner Border Detachment (53-й ПОГО) — Dauriya, Chita Oblast
- 51st Kyakhtinskiy Border Detachment (51-й ПОГО) — Kyakhta, Buryat Autonomous SSR
- 29th Kyzylskiy Border Detachment (29-й ПОГО) — Kyzyl, Tuva Autonomous SSR
- Separate Border-crossing Checkpoint «Zabaykalsk» (ОКПП «Забайкальск»)
- Separate Border-crossing Checkpoint «Irkutsk» (ОКПП «Иркутск»)

Air units:

- 18th Separate Aviation Squadron (18-я ОАЭ) — Chita – Cheremushki Airfield
  - Detachment at Kyzyl Airport

===== Red Banner Eastern Border District =====
The Red Banner Eastern Border District had its headquarters in Almaty. It guarded the western part of the Chinese-Soviet border and a small section of the Afghan-Soviet border along the Wakhan District, after which began the area of responsibility of the Central Asian Border District.

Land units:

- 134th Kurchumskiy Border Detachment (134-й ПОГО) — Kurshim, Kazakh SSR
- 50th Zaysanskiy Краснознаменный Border Detachment (50-й ПОГО) — Zaysan, Kazakh SSR
- 30th Makanchinskiy Краснознаменный Border Detachment (30-й ПОГО) — Makanchi, Kazakh SSR
- 130th Uch-Aaralskiy Border Detachment (130-й ПОГО) — Usharal, Kazakh SSR
- 49th Panfilovskiy Краснознаменный Border Detachment (49-й ПОГО) — Zharkent, Kazakh SSR
- 132nd Chundzhinskiy Border Detachment (132-й ПОГО) — Chundzha, Kazakh SSR
- 29th Przhevalskiy Border Detachment (29-й ПОГО) — Karakol, Kirghiz SSR
- 96th Narynskiy Border Detachment (96-й ПОГО) — Naryn, Kirghiz SSR
- 131st Oshskiy Border Detachment (131-й ПОГО) — Osh, Kirghiz SSR
- 35th Murghabskiy Border Detachment (35-й ПОГО) — Murghab, Tajik SSR

Air units:

- 10th Separate Aviation Regiment (10-й ОАП) — Almaty – Burunday Airfield
- 22nd Separate Aviation Squadron (22-я ОАЭ) — Usharal Airfield

===== Red Banner Central Asian Border District =====
The Red Banner Central Asian Border District (Russian: Краснознамённый Среднеазиатский пограничный округ) had its headquarters in Ashgabad. It guarded the Afghan-Soviet (without the strip along the Wakhan District) and the Iranian-Soviet border. The sea border of the district extended halfway along the southern line of Soviet territorial waters in the Caspian Sea until it met the AOR of the Red Banner Trans-Caucasus Border District.

Land units:

- 118th Ishkashimskiy Border Detachment (118-й ПОГО) — Ishkoshim, Tajik SSR
- 66th Khoroghskiy Border Detachment (66-й ПОГО) — Khorogh, Tajik SSR
- 117th Moskovskiy Border Detachment (117-й ПОГО) - Moskovskiy, Tajik SSR
- 48th Pyandzhskiy Border Detachment (48-й ПОГО) — Panj, Tajik SSR
- 81st Termezskiy Border Detachment (81-й ПОГО) — Termez, Uzbek SSR
- 47th Kerkinskiy Border Detachment (47-й ПОГО) — Kerki, Turkmen SSR
- 68th Tahta-Bazarskiy Border Detachment (68-й ПОГО) — Tahta-Bazar, Turkmen SSR
- 45th Serakhskiy Border Detachment (45-й ПОГО) — Serakhs, Turkmen SSR
- 46th Kaakhanskiy Border Detachment (46-й ПОГО) — Kaakha, Turkmen SSR
- 71st Baherdenskiy Border Detachment (71-й ПОГО) — Baherden, Turkmen SSR
- 67th Kara-Kalinskiy Border Detachment (76-й ПОГО) — Kara-Kala, Turkmen SSR
- 135th Nebit-Dagskiy Border Detachment (135-й ПОГО) — Nebit-Dag, Turkmen SSR
- 17th Training Border Detachment (17-й УПОГО) — Dushanbe, Tajik SSR
- Separate Border-crossing Checkpoint «Mary» (ОКПП «Мары»)
- Separate Border-crossing Checkpoint «Termez» (ОКПП «Термез»)
- Separate Border-crossing Checkpoint «Irkutsk» (ОКПП «Ташкент»)

Naval units:

- 22nd Separate Brigade of Border Guard Ships (22-я ОБрПСКР) — Termez, Uzbek SSR [river patrol]
- 46th Separate Battalion of Border Guard Ships (46-й ОДнПСКР) — Krasnovodsk, Turkmen SSR

Air units:

- 17th Separate Aviation Regiment (17-й ОАП) — Mary-3 Airfield
  - Detachment at Nebit-Dag Airfield
- 23rd Separate Aviation Regiment (23-й ОАП) — Dushanbe Airport

===== Red Banner Trans-Caucasus Border District =====
The Red Banner Trans-Caucasus Border District (Russian: Краснознамённый Закавказский пограничный округ) had its headquarters in Tbilisi. It guarded the western half of the Caspian Sea section of the Iranian-Soviet border, the western Iranian-Soviet land border, the Turkish-Soviet border and the Black Sea coastline from the Turkish border to the Kerch Strait, where the Red Banner Western Border District took over.

Land units:

- 44th Lenkoranskiy Border Detachment (44-й ПОГО) — Lankaran, Azeri SSR
- 43rd Prishibskiy Red Banner Border Detachment (43-й ПОГО) — Prishib, Azeri SSR
- 42nd Gadrutskiy Red Banner Border Detachment (42-й ПОГО) - Hadrut, Azeri SSR
- 127th Meghrinskiy Border Detachment (127-й ПОГО) — Meghri, Armenian SSR
- 41st Nakhichevanskiy Border Detachment (41-й ПОГО) — Nakhchivan, Azeri SSR
- 125th Artashatskiy Border Detachment (125-й ПОГО) — Artashat, Armenian SSR
- 40th Oktemberyanskiy "A. I. Mikoyan" Border Detachment (40-й ПОГО) — Armavir, Armenian SSR
- 39th Leninakanskiy Red Banner Border Detachment (39-й ПОГО) — Gyumri, Armenian SSR
- 38th Akhaltsikhskiy Red Banner Border Detachment (38-й ПОГО) — Akhaltsikhe, Georgian SSR
- 10th Hichaurskiy Border Detachment (10-й ПОГО) — Shuakhevi, Georgian SSR
- 37th Batumskiy Red Banner "Bulgarian-Soviet Combat Fellowship" Border Detachment (37-й ПОГО) — Batumi, Georgian SSR
- 36th Sukhumskiy Border Detachment (36-й ПОГО) — Sukhumi, Georgian SSR
- 32nd Novorossiyskiy Red Banner Border Detachment (32-й ПОГО) — Novorossiysk, Russian SFSR
- Separate Border-crossing Checkpoint «Novorossiysk» (ОКПП «Новороссийск»)
- Separate Border-crossing Checkpoint «Batumi») (ОКПП «Батуми»)
- Separate Border-crossing Checkpoint «Tbilisi Airport» (ОКПП «Тбилиси-аэропорт»)
- Separate Border-crossing Checkpoint «Astara» (ОКПП «Астара»)
- Separate Border-crossing Checkpoint «Julfa» (ОКПП «Джульфа»)

Naval units:

- 6th Separate Brigade of Border Guard Ships (6-я ОБрПСКР) — Ochamchire, Georgian SSR
- 17th Separate Brigade of Border Guard Ships (17-я ОБрПСКР) — Baku, Azeri SSR
- 21st Separate Brigade of Border Guard Ships (21-я ОБрПСКР) — Poti, Georgian SSR

Air units:

- 12th Separate Training Aviation Regiment (12-й ОУАП) — Tbilisi Airfield

===== Red Banner Western Border District =====
The Red Banner Western Border District (Russian: Краснознамённый Западный пограничный округ) had its headquarters in Kiev. It guarded the Black Sea coastline to the west of the Kerch Strait, the borders with Romania, Hungary, Czechoslovakia and the Ukrainian and Belarusian sections of the Polish-Soviet border. To the north began the AOR of the Red Banner Baltic Border District.

Land units:

- 16th Grodnenskiy Border Detachment (16-й ПОГО) — Grodno, Byelorussian SSR
- 86th Brestkiy Red Banner "F. E. Dzerzhinsky" Border Detachment (86-й ПОГО) — Brest, Byelorussian SSR
- 7th Karpatskiy, Awarded the orders of the Red Star, of Kutuzov and of Alexander Nevsky Border Detachment (7-й ПОГО) — Lviv, Ukrainian SSR
- 27th Mukachevskiy Red Banner Border Detachment (27-й ПОГО) — Mukachevo, Ukrainian SSR
- 98th Chernovitskiy Border Detachment (98-й ПОГО) — Chernivtsi, Ukrainian SSR
- 79th Nizhnednestrovskiy Red Banner Border Detachment (79-й ПОГО) — Chișinău, Moldavian SSR
- 26th Odesskiy Red Banner Border Detachment (26-й ПОГО) — Odessa, Ukrainian SSR
- 107th Simferopolskiy Red Banner Border Detachment (107-й ПОГО) — Simferopol, Crimea, Ukrainian SSR
- Separate Border-crossing Checkpoint «Kiev» (ОКПП «Киев»)
- Separate Border-crossing Checkpoint «Mariupol» (ОКПП «Мариуполь»)
- Separate Border-crossing Checkpoint «Brest» (ОКПП «Брест»)
- Separate Border-crossing Checkpoint «Mostyska» (ОКПП «Мостиска»)
- Separate Border-crossing Checkpoint «Odessa» (ОКПП «Одесса»)
- Separate Border-crossing Checkpoint «Chop» (ОКПП «Чоп»)
- Separate Border-crossing Checkpoint «Izmail» (ОКПП «Измаил»)

Naval units:

- 5th Separate Red Banner Brigade of Border Guard Ships (5-я ОБрПСКР) — Balaklava, Crimea, Ukrainian SSR
- 18th Separate Brigade of Border Guard Ships (18-я ОБрПСКР) — Odessa, Ukrainian SSR

Air units:

- 24th Separate Aviation Squadron (24-я ОАЭ) — Odessa – Shkolniy Airfield

===== Red Banner Baltic Border District =====
The Red Banner Baltic Border District (Russian: Краснознамённый Прибалтийский пограничный округ) had its headquarters in Riga. It guarded the Lithuanian and Kaliningrad sections of the Polish-Soviet border and the Kaliningrad, Lithuanian, Latvian and Estonian sections of the Baltic Sea Soviet coastline.

- Land units:
  - 95th Koenigsbergskiy, Awarded the orders of Lenin and of the Red Star Border Detachment (95-й ПОГО) — Pravdinsk, Kaliningrad Oblast, Russian SFSR
  - 23rd Klaypyedskiy Border Detachment (23-й ПОГО) — Klaipėda, Lithuanian SSR
  - 8th Ventspilsskiy Border Detachment (8-й ПОГО) — Ventspils, Latvian SSR
  - 11th Kuresaarskiy Border Detachment (11-й ПОГО) — Kuressaare, Estonian SSR
  - 106th Tallinnskiy Border Detachment (106-й ПОГО) — Tallinn, Estonian SSR
  - 6th Gdynskiy, Awarded the Order of the Red Star Border Detachment (6-й ПОГО) — Rakvere, Estonian SSR
  - Separate Border-crossing Checkpoint «Kaliningrad» (ОКПП «Калининград»)
  - Separate Border-crossing Checkpoint «Tallinn» (ОКПП «Таллин»)
  - Separate Border-crossing Checkpoint «Riga» (ОКПП «Рига»)
  - Separate Border-crossing Checkpoint «Vilnius» (ОКПП «Вильнюс»)
- Naval units:
  - 4th Separate Brigade of Border Guard Ships (4-я ОБрПСКР) — Liepāja, Latvian SSR
  - 20th Separate Brigade of Border Guard Ships (20-я ОБрПСКР) — Ventspils, Latvian SSR
  - 3rd Separate Red Banner Brigade of Border Guard Ships (3-я ОБрПСКР) — Tallinn, Estonian Soviet Socialist Republic
- Air units:
  - 20th Separate Aviation Squadron (20-я ОАЭ) — Rakvere Airfield
    - detachments at Riga – Skulte and Ventspils airfields

===== Red Banner Northwestern Border District =====
The Red Banner Northwestern Border District (Краснознамённый Северо-Западный пограничный округ) had its headquarters in Leningrad. It guarded the Russian section of the Baltic coastline, the Finnish-Soviet border, the Barents Sea, White Sea and the Kanin Peninsula coastline. Among the areas it controlled for border purposes were the Arkhangelsk Oblast, Vologda Oblast, Leningrad Oblast, Murmansk Oblast, Novgorod Oblast, and Pskov Oblast.

- Land units:
  - 5-й Leningradskiy пограничный отряд имени Ю. В. Андропова Border Detachment (5-й ПОГО) — Sosnovy Bor, Leningrad Oblast
  - 102-й Vyborgskiy Red Banner пограничный отряд имени С. М. Кирова Border Detachment (102-й ПОГО) — Vyborg, Leningrad Oblast, Russian SFSR
  - 1-й Sortavalskiy Red Banner Border Detachment (1-й ПОГО) — Sortavala, Karelian ASSR, Russian SFSR
  - 80-й Suoyarvskiy Red Banner Border Detachment (80-й ПОГО) — Suoyarvi, Karelian ASSR, Russian SFSR
  - 73-й Rebolskiy Red Banner Border Detachment (73-й ПОГО) — Repola, Karelian ASSR, Russian SFSR
  - 72-й Kalevalskiy, Awarded the Order of the Red Star Border Detachment (72-й ПОГО) — Kalevala, Karelian ASSR, Russian SFSR
  - 101-й Alakurttinskiy Border Detachment (101-й ПОГО) — Alakurtti, Murmansk Oblast, Russian SFSR
  - 100-й Nikelskiy, Awarded the Order of the Red Star Border Detachment (100-й ПОГО) — Nikel, Murmansk Oblast, Russian SFSR
  - 82-й Murmanskiy Red Banner Border Detachment (82-й ПОГО) — Murmansk, Murmansk Oblast, Russian SFSR
  - 4-й Arkhangelskiy Border Detachment (4-й ПОГО) — Arkhangelsk, Arkhangelsk Oblast, Russian SFSR
  - Separate Border-crossing Checkpoint «Leningrad» (ОКПП «Ленинград»)
  - Separate Border-crossing Checkpoint «Vyborg» (ОКПП «Выборг»)
- Naval units:
  - 1st Separate Red Banner Brigade of Border Guard Ships (1-я ОБрПСКР) — Kuvshinskaya Salma, Murmansk Oblast, Russian SFSR
  - 2nd Separate Brigade of Border Guard Ships (2-я ОБрПСКР) — Vysotsk, Leningrad Oblast, Russian SFSR
- Air units:
  - 14th Separate Aviation Regiment (14-й ОАП) — Petrozavodsk

==== Separate Border Detachments ====
The main forces of a border district were organised in formations called Border Detachments (singular: Пограничный отряд, abbr. ПОГО). These formations roughly corresponded to separate motor-rifle brigades in the Soviet Ground Forces. However, unlike army motor-rifle brigades, which were commanded by Major-generals, the Border Detachments were commanded by Colonels. Four of the border detachments were separate from the districts and reported directly to the Main Directorate:

- 4th Arkhangelsk Border Detachment (4-й Архангельский ПОГО)
- Separate Arctic Border Detachment (Отдельный Арктический ПОГО)
- The Separate Arctic Border Detachment (Russian: Отдельный Арктический пограничный отряд) had its headquarters in Vorkuta. The district did not have naval units. It had border outposts from Kolguyev Island to Mys Shmidta and a separate arctic aviation regiment.
- Separate Detachment for Border Control "Moscow" (Отдельный отряд пограничного контроля «Москва») - The detachment carried out border control duties at the major Moscow airports - 12 border control sections operated at Sheremetyevo-2 Airport and one section each at Sheremetyevo-1 Airport cargo terminal, Vnukovo Airport, Domodedovo Airport and Chkalovsky Airport.
- 105th Separate Red Banner Detachment Spetsnaz (105-й отдельный Краснознаменный отряд СпН) - The detachment was previously the sole Regiment of the Border Troops, legacy from the time when it belonged to the Soviet Ministry of the Interior. It consisted of one battalion, four separate companies and assorted support units and carried out security tasks at the Soviet embassy in East Germany, the main HQ of the KGB in East Germany and several field offices spread across the country. In 1989 the regiment was upgraded to a border detachment. With this its battalion was upgraded to a Motor-Maneuver Group (мото-маневренная группа) and the companies were upgraded to Border Outposts (singular: застава) in line with KGB Border Troops nomenclature.

==== Combined Arms troops ====
In times when the border troops were facing increased external threat or actual local conflict, they were reinforced with conventional units from the Soviet Ground Forces, which were directly integrated in their structure. Such example were tank and artillery battalions during the period of increased hostility during and immediately after the Sino-Soviet border conflict. In the final years of the USSR due to the mounting instability in the Caucasus region the Border Troops took over from the Armed Forces:

- the Soviet Ground Forces' 75th Motor Rifle Division (75-я Мотострелковая дивизия) - from January 4, 1990, until September 23, 1991
- the Soviet Airborne Forces' 103rd Guards Airborne Division (103-я Гвардейская воздушно-десантная дивизия) - from January 4, 1990, until September 23, 1991

=== District forces ===
The main forces of the border districts were the Border Detachments (Russian: Пограничный отряд, abbr. ПОГО (singular)). Each detachment covered a specific section of the border and had a Colonel as its commanding officer. The territorial waters were patrolled by brigades of guard ships (Russian: Бригада сторожевых кораблей, abbr. БСКР (singular)) and were commanded by Captains 1st rank. All the guard ship brigades were separate, except for the 1st and the 2nd, which formed the 1st Division of Guard Ships (Russian: 1-я Дивизия сторожевых кораблей) in Petropavlovsk-Kamchatsky, due to the vastness of the assigned area of operations in the Pacific Ocean.

The border detachments consisted of Border Command Posts (or Commandatures) (Russian: Пограничная командатура (singular)), Separate Bordercrossing Control Points (Russian: Отдельный контрольно-пропускной пункт, abbr. ОККП (singular)) and various combat support and combat service support units. A Border Command Post consisted of several Border Outposts and corresponded roughly to a battalion of the armed forces and was therefore commanded by a lieutenant colonel. The main forces of a BCP accounted several regular Border Outposts (Russian: Пограничная застава, abbr. ПОГЗ (singular)), also informally called Line Border Outposts, as each had a section of the state border assigned to it. In the rear area of the BCP there was also a Reserve Border Outpost acting as the operational reserve of the commander. It had the same structure as the line Border Outposts, but was not permanently deployed at the border. In a situation of increased threat its function was to take over the threatened section of the border, thus becoming a line outpost itself. The equivalent of a BCP in the naval service of the Border Troops was a Battalion of Guard Ships (Russian: Дивизион сторожевых кораблей), commanded by a Captain 2nd rank.

The Border Outpost (Russian: Пограничная застава, abbr. ПОГЗ) was the smallest unit of the Border Troops directly involved in securing the state border. The TO&E called for 41 officers, NCOs, Sergeants and border guards, organised in a staff group, 2 rifle sections, a service canine section and a signals and remote sensing section. Around the time of the Sino-Soviet border conflict a reinforced TO&E with an additional rifle section (50 men in total) was introduced and later, during the Soviet–Afghan War a new TO&E with a fourth rifle section was introduced, increasing the manpower to 64 men. The border outposts were equal in status to separate combat companies of the Ground Forces, with a major as the CO.

A specific operational reserve unit was the Motor Maneuver Group (Russian: Мото-маневренная группа (ММГ)). As the name implied, this was a maneuver element, organized similarly to an army motor rifle battalion, with its own infantry fighting vehicles, armored personnel carriers, mortars and anti-tank weapons. The MMG was a temporary task force fielded by the border detachment by combining personnel from its various units. On an operational deployment an MMG could act both as a classic BCP or as a mechanized warfare unit, the Soviet–Afghan War being the perfect example for this versatility. A typical example for a motor maneuver group was the MMG-1 (AKA the "Transcaucasus", later "Mazar-i-Sharif", later the "Marmoly" MMG) of the Termez Border Detachment, deployed to Afghanistan. It had:

- command section with one BTR-60 and one UAZ-469
- 3 border outposts, each consisting of 50 men, including three officers, two Sergeant-Majors and seven Sergeants, further divided into
  - 5 sections with one BTR-60 each
- mortar battery of 64 men, including five officers and a Sergeant-Major. The battery had one BTR-60 (R-145BM "Chayka" command variant) and fifteen GAZ-66 trucks.
- 6 mortar sections, each armed with one PM-120 (120-mm) and one BM-82 (82-mm) mortar
- reconnaissance platoon of 13 men, including one officer and two Sergeants. It had two sections - the first was armed with a BRM-1, the second - with a BTR-60
- anti-tank platoon of 18 men, including one officer and three Sergeants. The platoon had 4 SPG-9 and 4 GAZ-66 in two sections of two AT teams each.
- combat engineer platoon of 20 men, including one officer, one Sergeant-Major and five Sergeants. The platoon had BTR-60, ZIL-131, GAZ-66 and heavy engineering machinery divided among two sapper sections and one engineering section
- signals platoon with two BTR-60s (R-145BM "Chayka" command variant) and an R-140 radio mounted on a ZIL-157
- medical aid post with a medical officer, a Sergeant-Major and an ambulance driver. Each of the three border outposts and the mortar battery had a paramedic, operationally subordinated to the medical officer
- logistical platoon of 29 men, including two Sergeant-Majors and three Sergeants. The platoon was subdivided into
  - a supply, a transport and a repair sections

The MMG numbered a total personnel of ca. 300 men. In case the area of operation covered mountainous terrain the border detachments could form heliborne task forces called Air Assault Maneuver Groups (Russian: Десантно-штурмовая маневренная группа, abbr. ДШМГ (singular)). The personnel received parachute and helicopter assault training and adopted Soviet Airborne Forces and Ground Forces Air Assault Troops tactics, weapons and equipment to such an extent, that these units used the traditional VDV patch of two cargo airplanes, a parachute and a red star. These units utilized the organic Mi-8 helicopters of the Border Troops aviation branch. Due to their airborne role and the restricted cargo capacity of their aviation assets (as compared to the mechanized MMGs), these units normally counted ca. 120 men. An example for such a unit is the

AAMG formed by the same Termez Border Detachment for operations in Afghanistan. It had:

- command section
- 3 air assault border outposts
- mortar platoon
- AGS-17 grenade launcher platoon
- grenade launcher / flamethrower platoon
- combat engineer platoon
- signals platoon

The border area was divided into a border zone, which included the territory of the district and settlements adjacent to the state border, and the border strip, which was approximately two kilometers in depth, running directly along the border. Only permanent residents or those who had obtained special permission from the MVD could enter the border zone. Entry into the border strip was forbidden without special permission from the Border Troops.

=== Border Troops Naval Service ===
The Border Troops had their own naval assets. They were subordinated administratively to the Sea Directorate of the Border Troops (Морское управление пограничных войск), headed by a rear admiral or vice admiral. Operationally the naval units were subordinated to the border districts. The patrol ships of the naval service were much heavier armed than similar-sized ships of coast guards around the world. They lacked the sophisticated anti-air and anti-ship missile systems, but were armed with artillery as heavy as the AK-100 and for their ASW they carried anti-submarine mortars, torpedoes and even anti-submarine missile systems. Soviet and Russian naval classification did not follow Western convention for smaller major surface combatants. While Western navies use classification based on the ship's size (aviso, corvette, frigate, destroyer), the Soviet Navy (and by extension the KGB's naval service) used classification based on the ship's function. Thus the corvette and frigate-sized warships of the Navy and the Naval Service were classified as guard ships (sing. сторожевой корабль, abbreviated SKR (СКР)). To distinguish the ships of the border troops from those of the navy, the former are classified as border guard ships (sing. пограничный сторожевой корабль, abbreviated PSKR (ПСКР)) and to distinguish between the larger and smaller units in their fleet the corvette and frigate-sized units were classified as ships (sing. корабль, abbreviated KR (КР)), while the smaller patrol craft were classified as cutters (sing. катер, abbreviated KA (КА)). The types of ships in the Border Troops fleet included:

- border guard ship (пограничный сторожевой корабль (ПСКР)) - patrol corvettes and frigates
- border guard cutter (пограничный сторожевой катер (ПСКА)) - patrol craft
- border support ship (пограничный корабль обеспечения (ПКО)) - replenishment ships
- patrol vessel (патрульное судно (ПС)) - fishery patrol ships
- border ship in special service (пограничный корабль специальной службы (ПКСС)) - corvette / frigate-sized official government yachts
- border cutter in special service (пограничный катер специальной службы (ПКАСС)) - small guard craft, used for the security of coastal areas of official government sea residences and government yachts

Note: The border districts and their subordinated formations are listed clockwise, starting with the easternmost area of the Soviet Union.

Naval Service fleet:

Northeastern Border District (СВПО) - HQ in Petropavlovsk-Kamchatsky

- 1st Red Banner Division of Border Guard Ships (1-я КДПСКР) — Petropavlovsk-Kamchatsky
  - 1st Brigade of Border Guard Ships (1-я БрПСКР)
    - single ship project 52K - PSKR-010 "Purga" (retired on 16.03.1990.)
    - patrol icebreakers of project 97P "Iceberg" - PSKR-161 "Aysberg", PSKR-083 "Dunay"
    - patrol tugboats of project 745P - PSKR-135 "Brest", PSKR-081 "Sakhalin", PSKR-070 "Kamchatka"
  - 2nd Brigade of Border Guard Ships (2-я БрПСКР)
    - patrol frigates of project 11351 - PSKR-097 "Dzerzhinskiy", PSKR-059 "Vorovskiy", PSKR-103 "Kedrov", PSKR-060 "Imeni 70-letiya Pogranvoisk", PSKR-077 "Imeni 70-letiya VChK—KGB"
    - patrol corvettes of project 1124M - PSKR-055 "Bditelniy", PSKR-014 "Bezuprechniy", PSKR-058 "Zorkiy", PSKR-067 "Reshitelniy", PSKR-052 "Smeliy"
    - former navy minesweepers of project 264А - PSKR-035 "Vorovskiy", PSKR-066 "Dzerzhinskiy", PSKR-046 "Menzhinskiy", PSKR-032 "Kirov", PSKR-015 "Kedrov", PSKR-010 "Hokhryakov", PSKR-105 "Starshiy leytenant Lekarev", PSKR-083 "Fyodor Mitrofanov", PSKR-059 "Vasiliy Gromov", PSKR-080 "Malakhit", PSKR- 076 "Korund"
  - Supply Ships Battalion (ДнКО)
    - 3 sealift ships of project 1595 "Pevek" - PKO-063 "Nikolay Sipyagin", PKO-071 "Sergey Sudeyskiy", PKO-016 "Nikolay Starshinov"

Red Banner Pacific Border District (КТПО) - HQ in Vladivostok

- 8th Awarded the Order of the Red Star Separate Brigade of Border Guard Ships (8-я ОБрПСКР) — Malokurilskoye, Shikotan, Kuril Islands
  - patrol tugboats of project 745P - "Chukotka", "Neman", "Amur", "Bug"
  - patrol tugboat of project 733 - PSKR-467, PSKR-482
  - patrol boats of project 10410 - PSKR-907, PSKR-908, PSKR-914
  - fast patrol craft of project 205P - PSKR-675, 677, 678, 679, 682, 685, 686, 687, 688, 689, 691,
  - tugboats of project 1496 - 2 units
  - fast patrol boats of project 1408.1 - 3 units
  - liaison boats of project 371U - 1 unit
- 9th Separate Brigade of Border Guard Ships (9-я ОБрПСКР) — Korsakov, Sakhalin
  - fast patrol craft of project 205P - PSKR-673, 680, 681, 683, 687, 690
- 19th Separate Brigade of Border Guard Ships (19-я ОБрПСКР) — Nevelsk, Sakhalin
  - patrol tugboats of project 745P - "Забайкалье"
  - patrol boats of project 10410 - PSKR-903 "Holmsk", PSKR-907, PSKR-915 "Nevelsk"
  - fast patrol craft of project 205P - PSKR-672, 674(?), 680, 681, 683, 684, 692, 693, 694
  - tugboats of project 1496 - PSKA-277
- 16th Sakhalinskaya Red Banner Separate Brigade of Border Guard Ships (16-я ОБрПСКР) — Nakhodka
  - patrol frigates of project 11351 - PSKR- "Menzhinskiy", "Imeni XXVII Syezda KPSS"
  - patrol tugboats of project 745P - "Приморье"
  - fast patrol craft (corvettes) of project 12412 - PSKR-800 "Беркут", PSKR-801 "Ворон", PSKR-803 "Кондор", PSKR-805 "Коршун", PSKR-807 "Кобчик", PSKR-809 "Кречет", PSKR-812 "Сокол", PSKR-816 "Ястреб", PSKR-818 "Находка" (собственные имена получили в 1996 г.)
  - fast patrol craft of project 205P - PSKR-670, PSKR-674(?), PSKR-676, PSKR-678
  - tugboats of project 1496 - PSKA-580, PSKA-582, PSKA-586, PSKA-587, PSKA-590, PSKA-591, PSKA-592(?), PSKA-594
  - liaison boats of project 371 - 1 unit
  - liaison boats of project 343 - 1 unit
- 10th Separate Brigade of Border Guard Ships (10-я ОБрПСКР) — Vladivostok
  - ПКО проект 1595 - "Ivan Lednyov", "Mikhail Konovalov", "Vyacheslav Denisov", "Ivan Evteev", "Neon Antonov",
  - ПКО project 1545- PKO- "Ivan Golubets", PKO- "Sovetskiy Pogranichnik"
  - fishery patrol vessels of project 850285 - "Командор", "Хеолуф Бидструп", "Манчжур", "Шкипер Гек"
  - fast patrol boats of project 1400 - PSKA-110
- 15th Separate Brigade of Border Guard Ships (15-я ОБрПСКР) — Dalnerechensk [river patrol]
  - riverine monitors of project 1249 - PSKR- (used as command ship)
  - riverine monitors of project 1204 - 325
  - liaison boats of project 371 - no less than 9 units

Red Banner Far Eastern Border District (КДПО) - HQ in Khabarovsk

- 14th Separate Brigade of Border Guard Ships (14-я ОБрПСКР) — Kazakevichevo, Khabarovsk Krai [river patrol]
  - riverine monitors of project 1249 - PSKR-52, PSKR-58 (used as command ship)
  - riverine monitors of project 1248 - PSKR-313, PSKR-314
  - riverine monitors of project 1208 - "им. 60-летия ВЧК", "им. 60-летя Октября", "им 60-летия погранвойск", "Вьюга"
  - riverine monitors of project 1204 - 313, 332, 336, 337, 350, 351, 354, 359, 360, 376, 378, 382,
  - riverine patrol boats of project 1408.1
  - liaison boats of project 371
- 13th Separate Brigade of Border Guard Ships (13-я ОБрПСКР) — Leninskoye, Jewish Autonomous Oblast [river patrol]
  - riverine monitors of project 1249 - 1 unit used as command ship
  - riverine monitors of project 1248 - PSKR-300, PSKR-301, PSKR-302, PSKR-303, PSKR-304, PSKR-305, PSKR-306, PSKR-308, PSKR-311
- 12th Separate Brigade of Border Guard Ships (12-я ОБрПСКР) — Blagoveshchensk [river patrol]
  - riverine monitors of project 1249 - 1 unit used as command ship
  - riverine monitors of project 1248
  - riverine monitors of project 1204 - 330, 333, 340, 341, 348, 349, 353, 355, 356, 357, 362, 365, 367, 369, 370, 372, 380, 386,
  - riverine patrol boats of project 1408.1
  - liaison boats of project 371
- 11th Separate Brigade of Border Guard Ships (11-я ОБрПСКР) — Dzhalinda [river patrol]
  - riverine monitors of project 1204 - unknown quantity

Red Banner Trans-Baikal Border District (КЗабПО) - HQ in Chita

- mostly land border, no naval units

Red Banner Eastern Border District (СВПО) - HQ in Almaty

- mostly land border, no naval units

Red Banner Central Asian Border District (КСАПО) - HQ in Ashgabat

- 22nd Separate Brigade of Border Guard Ships (22-я ОБрПСКР) — Termez, Uzbek SSR [river patrol]
  - riverine monitors of project 1204 - unknown quantity
- 46th Separate Battalion of Border Guard Ships (46-й ОДнПСКР) — Krasnovodsk, Turkmen SSR
  - fast patrol boats of project 1400/M - 5 ~ 6

Red Banner Trans-Caucasus Border District (КЗакПО) - HQ in Tbilisi

- 6th Separate Brigade of Border Guard Ships (6-я ОБрПСКР) — Ochamchire, Georgian SSR
  - fast patrol craft of project 205P - PSKR-616, PSKR-631, PSKR-638, PSKR-641, PSKR-644, PSKR-649, PSKR-657, PSKR-659, PSKR-721, PSKR-723
  - fast patrol craft of project 201 - PSKR-252, PSKR-261
  - fast patrol craft of project 125А - PSKR-152, PSKR-162, PSKR-163, PSKR-165
  - fast patrol craft of project 133 - PSKR-100, PSKR-101, PSKR-102
  - fast patrol boats of project 1400 - PSKA-275, PSKA-510, PSKA-520, PSKA-525, PSKA-559, PSKA-576, PSKA-577
  - Battalion ГУК (Group of Training Cutters) - fast patrol boats of project 1400 - PSKA-500, PSKA-501, PSKA-502, PSKA-503
- 17th Separate Brigade of Border Guard Ships (17-я ОБрПСКР) — Baku, Azeri SSR
  - fast patrol craft of project 10410 - PSKR-902, PSKR-905
  - fast patrol craft of project 205P - PSKR-603, PSKR-605, PSKR-609, PSKR-610, PSKR-617, PSKR-618, PSKR-624, PSKR-625, PSKR-656, PSKR-658, PSKR-664, PSKR-666, PSKR-669
  - fast patrol boats of project 1400 - 6 unknown units
  - former Navy minesweepers of 264 - 2 unknown units
- 21st Separate Brigade of Border Guard Ships (21-я ОБрПСКР) — Poti, Georgian SSR
  - fast patrol craft (corvettes) of project 12412 - PSKR-808 "Grif", PSKR-811 "Orlan", PSKR-814 "Sarych", PSKR-291 "Novorossiysk" (formerly Navy MPK-291 (small ASW ship)), PSKR-292 "Kuban" (formerly Navy MPK-292 (small ASW ship))
  - fast patrol craft of project 205P - PSKA-651, PSKA-660, PSKA-665, PSKA-695, PSKA-700, PSKA-715
  - fast patrol craft of project 133 - PSKR-109, PSKR-110
  - fast patrol boats of project 1400 - PSKA-513, PSKA-516, PSKA-553, PSKA-554, PSKA-563

Red Banner Western Border District (КЗапПО) - HQ in Kiev

- 5th Separate Red Banner Brigade of Border Guard Ships (5-я ОБрПСКР) — Balaklava, Crimea, Ukrainian SSR
  - fast patrol craft (corvettes) of project 1124P - PSKR- "Dnepr", PSKR- "Izmail"
  - fast patrol craft (corvettes) of project 12412 - PSKR-813 "Гр. Куропятников", PSKR-815 "Гр. Гнатенко"
  - fast patrol craft of project 205P - PSKR-623, PSKR-629, PSKR-630, PSKR-635, PSKR-636, PSKR-637, PSKR-642, PSKR-645, PSKR-722
  - fast patrol craft of project 133 - PSKR-103, PSKR-105, PSKR-108, PSKR-115
  - fast patrol boats of project 1400 - PSKA-125, PSKA-141, PSKA-508, PSKA-510, PSKA-523, PSKA-524, PSKA-525, PSKA-534
- 18th Separate Brigade of Border Guard Ships (18-я ОБрПСКР) — Odessa, Ukrainian SSR
  - fast patrol craft of project 205P - PSKR-643(?), PSKR-648, PSKR-650, PSKR-652, PSKR-702, PSKR-705, PSKR-709, PSKR-720
  - fast patrol craft of project 125A - PSKR-165
  - fast patrol boats of project 1400 - PSKA-509, PSKA-511, PSKA-512, PSKA-513, PSKA-516, PSKA-517, PSKA-518, PSKA-519, PSKA-520, PSKA-526, PSKA-527, PSKA-528, PSKA-529, PSKA-531, PSKA-546, PSKA-547, PSKA-550, PSKA-555, PSKA-558, PSKA-562, PSKA-574, PSKA-579

Red Banner Baltic Border District (КППО) - HQ in Riga

- 4th Separate Brigade of Border Guard Ships (4-я ОБрПСКР) — Liepāja, Latvian SSR
  - fast patrol craft (corvettes) of project 1124P - PSKR-626 "Nikolay Kaplunov"
  - fast patrol craft of project 205P - PSKR-600, PSKR-602, PSKR-606(?), PSKR-614, PSKR-615, PSKR-639, PSKR-646, PSKR-663, PSKR-710, PSKR-713, PSKR-717
  - fast patrol craft of project 125A - PSKR-153, PSKR-154
  - patrol tugboat of project 745P - "Yan Berzin"
- 20th Separate Brigade of Border Guard Ships (20-я ОБрПСКР) — Ventspils, Latvian SSR
  - fast patrol craft (corvettes) of project 12412 - PSKR-810 "N. Kaplunov", PSKR-815 "Sobol", PSKR-817 "Jaguar"
  - fast patrol craft of project 205P - PSKR-613, PSKR-619, PSKR-620, PSKR-621, PSKR-622, PSKR-634, PSKR-696, PSKR-697, PSKR-698, PSKR-703, PSKR-706, PSKR-714, PSKR-724
  - patrol tugboat of project 745P - "Ural"
- 3rd Separate Red Banner Brigade of Border Guard Ships (3-я ОБрПСКР) — Tallinn, Estonian SSR
  - fast patrol craft (corvettes) of project 12412 - PSKR-802 "Kunitsa", PSKR-804 "Toliatti", PSKR-806 "Kaliningrad"
  - fast patrol craft of project 205P - PSKR-601, PSKR-608, PSKR-627, PSKR-628, PSKR-632, PSKR-633, PSKR-634, PSKR-640, PSKR-643(?), PSKR-647, PSKR-655, PSKR-708, PSKR-716, PSKR-718, PSKR-719, PSKR-725
  - fast patrol craft of project 201 - PSKR-032, PSKR-071
  - fast patrol craft of project 133 - PSKR-094, PSKR-080, PSKR-072
  - fast patrol craft of project 125A - 2 unknown units
  - fast patrol craft of project 1400 - 2 unknown units
  - patrol tugboat of project 745P - "Viktor Kingisepp"

Red Banner Northwestern Border District (КСЗПО) - HQ in Petrozavodsk

- 1st Separate Red Banner Brigade of Border Guard Ships (1-я ОБрПСКР) — Kuvshinskaya Salma, Murmansk Oblast, Russian SFSR
  - patrol corvettes of project 1124P - PSKR-015 "Brilliant", PSKR-048 "Zhemchug", PSKR-022 "Izumrud", PSKR-028 "Rubin", PSKR-055 "Ametyst", PSKR-036 "Sapphir", PSKR-097 "Provorniy", PSKR-079 "Predanniy", PSKR-047 "Nadezhdniy", PSKR-066 "Dozorniy"
  - patrol tugboats of project 745P - PSKR- "Karelia", PSKR- "Zapolyarye", PSKR- "Enisey"
  - patrol icebreakers of project 97P "Iceberg" - PSKR-036 "Imeni XXVI syezda KPSS"
  - patrol tugboat of project 733 - PSKR-460
- 2nd Separate Brigade of Border Guard Ships (2-я ОБрПСКР) — Vysotsk, Leningrad Oblast, Russian SFSR
  - fast patrol craft of project 205P - PSKR-604, PSKR-611, PSKR-612, PSKR-633, PSKR-653, PSKR-654, PSKR-661, PSKR-662, PSKR-667, PSKR-699, PSKR-701, PSKR-704, PSKR-707, PSKR-711, PSKR-712
  - patrol tugboats of project 745P - PSKR- "Ladoga"

=== Border Troops Aviation ===
The Border Troops had their own aviation assets. Administratively they fell under the Aviation Department of the Border Troops (Авиационный отдел пограничных войск), with a Major general / Lieutenant general as its chief. Operationally the aviation units were subordinated to the border districts. Unlike its predecessor - the Border Troops of the NKVD (which fielded their own bombers and ground attack aircraft prior to and during World War II), the air arm of the Border Troops of the KGB played a combat support role to the border guards and the patrol ships. The only purely combat aircraft type in service was the Mil Mi-24 attack helicopter. The mainstay of the BT air fleet - the Mil Mi-8, had limited ground attack capabilities. The Border Troops aviation's main role was to deliver supplies and troops to remote border outposts, to deliver foot patrols in remote areas and to mount heli-borne assaults in combat operations. Kamov Ka-27PS helicopters supported the operations of the Border Troops' naval arm. The service also had a small number of Ilyushin Il-76 heavy troop transport jets, which could deliver reinforcements between the various border districts. The Il-76s, Tu-154s and Yak-40s of the Moscow Special Purpose Aviation Unit were also tasked with rapid deployment of the KGB's special operations units (Alpha Group, Vympel Group, Sigma Group etc.). A secondary role of the service was to provide executive air transport for the KGB as a whole, for which it also had Tupolev Tu-134 (later Tupolev Tu-154) and Yakovlev Yak-40 in its inventory. At the time of the Soviet Union's collapse the Border Troops aviation had the following structure:

Note: The border districts and their subordinated formations are listed clockwise, starting with the easternmost area of the Soviet Union.

Units directly reporting to the Main Directorate of the Border Troops:

- Separate Special Purpose Aviation Unit (ОАО СН), based at Moscow – Sheremetyevo-2 Airport: 2 Tupolev Tu-154, 2 Tupolev Tu-134, 4 Ilyushin Il-76, 4 Antonov An-72, 1 Yakovlev Yak-40, 4 Mil Mi-8
- Combat Training Center of the Border Troops Aviation (ЦБП АПВ), based at Stavropol – Shpakovskoye Airport
  - combat training was carried out at the 12th Separate Training Air Regiment of the Caucasus Border District in Tbilisi

Separate Arctic Border Detachment (ОАПО) - HQ in Vorkuta

- (1st ?) Separate Arctic Aviation Regiment (1-й (?) ОААП), based at Vorkuta Airport: 3 Antonov An-26, 1 Antonov An-24, 40 Mil Mi-8, 2 Mil Mi-26, 4 Kamov Ka-27PS
  - detachments at Tiksi Airport and Chersky Airport
  - Forward Operating Locations at Murmansk Airport, Naryan-Mar Airport, Khatanga Airport, Chokurdakh Airport and Sredny Ostrov Airfield

Northeastern Border District (СВПО) - HQ in Petropavlovsk-Kamchatsky

- 15th Separate Aviation Regiment (15-й ОАП), based at Petropavlovsk-Kamchatsky – Yelizovo Airport (the helicopters were based in a detachment at Yelizovo – Khalakhtyrka Airfield): 2 Antonov An-26, 6 Antonov An-72, 20 Mil Mi-8, 4 Kamov Ka-27PS, 4 Kamov Ka-25 ?, 2 Mil Mi-26 ?
  - Detachment at Klyuchi-1 Air Base
- 21st Separate Aviation Squadron (21-я ОАЭ), based at Magadan – Sokol Airport: 1 Antonov An-26, 1 Antonov An-24, 4 Mil Mi-8
  - Forward Operating Location at Okhotsk
- 7th Separate Aviation Squadron (7-я ОАЭ), based at Providence Bay Airfield : 1 Antonov An-26, 1 Antonov An-24, 2 Kamov Ka-27PS, 4 Mil Mi-8
  - Forward Operating Locations at Anadyr Airport, Mys Shmidta Airport, Cape Dezhnev, Vankarem, Kresta Bay, Saint Lawrence Bay and Egvekinot

Red Banner Pacific Border District (КТПО) - HQ in Vladivostok

- 11th Separate Aviation Regiment (11-й ОАП), based at Vladivostok – Knevichi Airport: 3 Antonov An-26, 1 Yakovlev Yak-40, 22 Mil Mi-8, 4 Mil Mi-24, 3 Kamov Ka-27PS
  - Detachment at Sovetskaya Gavan Airfield
  - Forward Operating Locations at Dalnerechensk, Kamen-Rybolov, Spassk-Dalny Airfield and Pogranichny
- 16th Separate Aviation Regiment (16-й ОАП), based at Yuzhno-Sakhalinsk – Khomutovo Airport: 2 Antonov An-26, 4 Antonov An-72, 1 Yakovlev Yak-40, 20 Mil Mi-8, 4 Mil Mi-24, 4 Kamov Ka-27PS
  - Detachment at Yuzhno-Kurilsk Mendeleyevo Airport

Red Banner Far Eastern Border District (КДПО) - HQ in Khabarovsk

- 16th Separate Aviation Squadron (16-я ОАЭ), based at Khabarovsk Airport: 1 Antonov An-26, 1 Antonov An-24, 1 Yakovlev Yak-40, 4 Mil Mi-8
- 19th Separate Aviation Squadron (19-я ОАЭ), based at Blagoveshchensk Airfield: 1 Antonov An-26, 1 Antonov An-24, 4 Mil Mi-8, 4 Mil Mi-24

Red Banner Trans-Baikal Border District (КЗабПО) - HQ in Chita

- 18th Separate Aviation Squadron (18-я ОАЭ), based at Chita – Cheremushki Airfield: 1 Antonov An-26, 1 Antonov An-24, 4 Mil Mi-8
  - Detachment at Kyzyl Airport

Red Banner Eastern Border District (СВПО) - HQ in Almaty

- 10th Separate Aviation Regiment (10-й ОАП), based at Almaty – Burunday Airfield: 2 Antonov An-72, 2 Antonov An-26, 2 Yakovlev Yak-40, 18 Mil Mi-8, 8 Mil Mi-24, 2 Mil Mi-26
- 22nd Separate Aviation Squadron (22-я ОАЭ), based at Usharal Airfield: 15 Mil Mi-8, 4 Mil Mi-24

Red Banner Central Asian Border District (КСАПО) - HQ in Ashgabat

- 17th Separate Aviation Regiment (17-й ОАП), based at Mary-3 Airfield: 2 Antonov An-26, 36 Mil Mi-8, 16 Mil Mi-24, 2 Mil Mi-26 (?)
  - Detachment at Nebit-Dag Airfield
- 23rd Separate Aviation Regiment (23-й ОАП), based at Dushanbe Airport: 2 Antonov An-26, 24 Mil Mi-8, 12 Mil Mi-24, 2 Mil Mi-26

Red Banner Trans-Caucasus Border District (КЗакПО) - HQ in Tbilisi

- 12th Separate Training Aviation Regiment (12-й ОУАП), based at Tbilisi Airfield: 2 Antonov An-26, 2 Antonov An-72, 1 Yakovlev Yak-40, 4 Mil Mi-8, 4 Mil Mi-24, 2 Kamov Ka-27PS

Red Banner Western Border District (КЗапПО) - HQ in Kiev

- 24th Separate Aviation Squadron (24-я ОАЭ), based at Odessa – Shkolniy Airfield: 15 Mil Mi-8, 4 Mil Mi-24

Red Banner Baltic Border District (КППО) - HQ in Riga

- 20th Separate Aviation Squadron (20-я ОАЭ), based at Rakvere Airfield: 2 Antonov An-26, 1 Antonov An-24, 4 Mil Mi-8, 2 Kamov Ka-27PS
  - detachments at Riga – Skulte and Ventspils airfields

Red Banner Northwestern Border District (КСЗПО) - HQ in Petrozavodsk

- 14th Separate Aviation Regiment (14-й ОАП), based at Petrozavodsk: 3 Antonov An-26, 1 Antonov An-24, 24 Mil Mi-8

=== Landing Assault units ===
The Border Troops had Landing Assault Manoeuvre Groups (sing. десантно-штурмовая маневренная группа (ДШМГ)). The LAMGs of the KGB's Border Troops were temporary task forces, organised for a period of time by a Border Guard Detachment (пограничный отряд (ПОГО)), the border guard equivalent of an army brigade. The BG detachments formed temporary task forces, equivalent to battalions, for manoeuvre warfare. The land component units were called Motorised Manoeuvre Group (мото-маневренная группа (ммг)) and consisted of 3 or 4 Motorised Manoeuvre Border Outposts (sing. мото-маневренная пограничная застава), the Border Troops equivalent of a company). The 1st MMBO was armed with BMP-1 or BMP-2, the 2nd MMBO was armed with BTR-70 and the 3rd MMBO was armed with BTR-60PB. Each MMBO had 5 BMPs or BTRs. The MMG also had a motorised mortar battery, an anti-tank platoon and additional support units for a total of ca. 300 men. The fire and service support units were motorised with GAZ-66 light trucks. The Landing Assault Manoeuvre Group formed the airmobile component, which operated in concert with the MMGs. While both types of units were commanded by Border Troops Lieutenant-Colonels, with manpower of less than 50 an LAMG number far fewer men than both the Border Troops's MMGs and the Landing Assault Battalions of the Ground Forces. An LAMG consisted of a command element and two Landing Assault Manoeuvre Border Outposts and had the following structure:

Landing Assault Manoeuvre Group

- command group (группа управления): 8 men - Commander (начальник ДШМГ); NCO; Translator; Paramedic; Radio Operator; 3 Sappers
- 1st Landing Assault Manoeuvre Border Outpost (1 ДШПЗ) : 21 men
  - Commander (начальник ДШПЗ)
  - Fire Section (огневое отделение): 10 men - SPG-9 team of 3 men; AGS-17 team of 2 men; PK machine gun team of 2 men; RPG-7 team of 2 men and 1 Sniper / Radio Operator armed with SVD and equipped with R-392 radio
  - Rifle Section (стрелковое отделение): 10 men - 1 Commander and 9 Riflemen, armed with Kalashnikov rifles (some with night vision sights) and equipped with 1 R-392 radio
- 2nd Landing Assault Manoeuvre Border Outpost (2 ДШПЗ): 21 men, identical to 1st LAMBO

The LAMG relied on Mil Mi-24 attack helicopters and Mi-8MTV-1 assault helicopters from the KGB Border Troops' own aviation assets.

== See also ==
- Eastern Bloc emigration and defection
- Medal "For Distinction in Guarding the State Border of the USSR"
- Border Security Zone of Russia
- Mathias Rust
