= Eastern Border District =

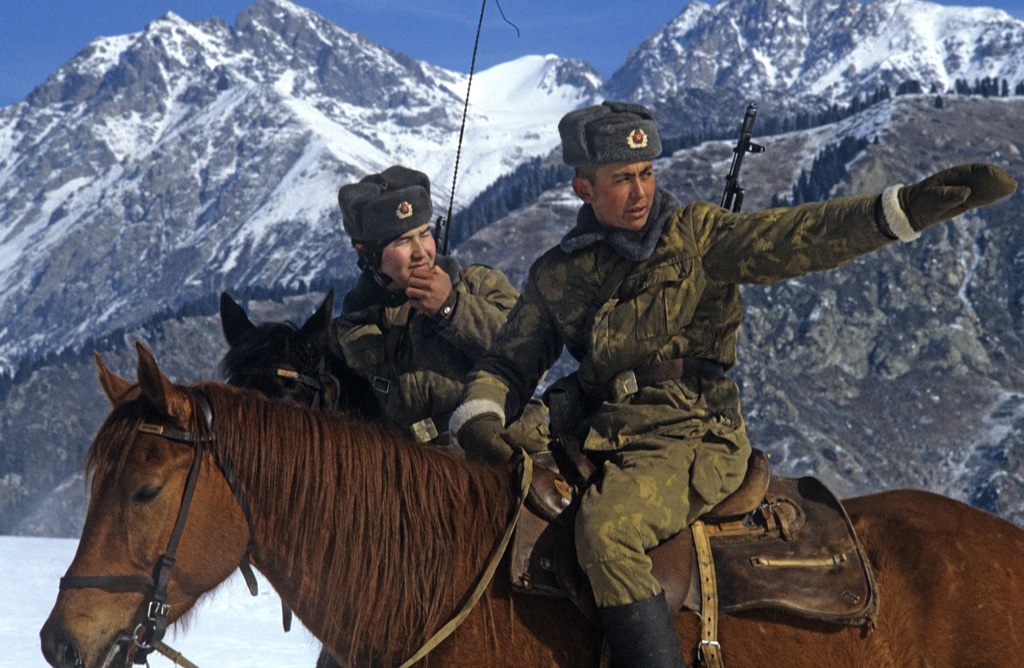
Mounted Alpine Frontier Guards, January 1984

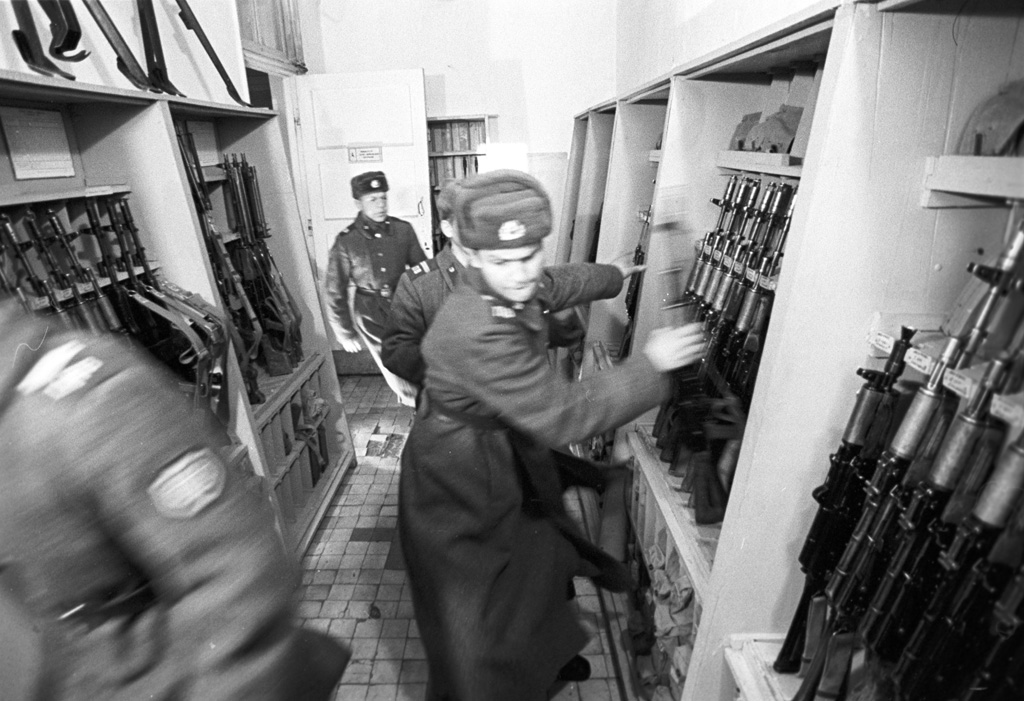
The alarm sounds at the KGB's Khorgos border post in the Taldy-Kurgan region, 1984.

The Red Banner Eastern Border District (Краснознамённый Восточный пограничный округ) (KВPO) - was a military-administrative district of the Soviet Border Troops. The district had its headquarters in Almaty. It guarded the western part of the Chinese-Soviet border and a small section of the Afghan-Soviet border along the Wakhan District, after which began the terrain of the Red Banner Central Asian Border District.

On May 28, 1918, the Decree on the creation of the border guard of the Soviet Republic was signed. After the end of the Civil War, the "Turkestan Border Division" was created by the end of 1920. In November 1920, this division was deployed from the Caspian Sea to the Altai Mountains. The Turkestan border division included regiments, brigades and cavalry squadrons, each covering an area of border responsibility.

In 1923, during the reform of the border troops, border departments were created as part of border guard units created under administrative-territorial units (provinces). These formations were subordinate to the head of the border guard unit of the plenipotentiary representative of the State Political Directorate (GPU) provincial detachments. In February 1924, in the course of further reform of the border troops, border detachments and commandant's offices were created on the basis of border departments and border units, which included border outposts.

After the German Operation Barbarossa began in July 1941, massive numbers of the border and Internal Troops of the NKVD were sent to the "Active Army" (the troops actually fighting on the frontline). For example, by June 26, 1941, 31 commanders of the Zaysan border detachment were appointed to the corresponding positions in the 942nd Infantry Regiment, 268th Rifle Division, which at the end the following month entered into battle as part of the 8th Army.

On June 5, 1943, by order of the People's Commissar of Internal Affairs, the Kyrgyz Border District was established. The number of detained border violators in 1943 increased by 4 times compared to 1942. In 1945, their number doubled compared to 1944. In total, during the war, the personnel of the newly formed district detained 3423 border violators.

== Post-War Period ==
On June 2, 1953, in connection with the dissolution of the Trans-Baikal District, the 29th Kyzyl Border Detachment was transferred to the Directorate of Border Troops of the Kazakh District.

In 1953, the Kyrgyz district was abolished. The Frunzensk border detachment and section of the border on the territory of the Kyrgyz SSR was transferred to the Kazakh border district.

On February 26, 1954, the Kazakh Border District was renamed the Eastern Border District. The district consisted of 6 border detachments. Also, the 119th border detachment from the Central Asian border district was transferred to the district. The length of the area of responsibility of the district increased to 3919 kilometers.

== Afghanistan War and dissolution of the Soviet Union ==
To support the district's combat missions in Afghanistan, the Eastern Border District Operational Troops Group was formed in Ishkashim, Tajik SSR. On August 18, 1990, it was reformed as the 118th Ishkashim Border Detachment and transferred to the Central Asian Border District.

After the collapse of the USSR, some former CIS republics retained unified border troops. On August 18, 1992, the KVPO units were divided between Kazakhstan and Russia. Most of the district's units and formations became part of the Kazakhstan Border Troops.

Until 1999, due to the difficult economic and political situation, the border detachments of the former Eastern District in Kyrgyzstan were under Russian jurisdiction. After 1999, the State Border Service of the Kyrgyz Republic was established on their basis.

The Murghab Border Detachment, like other border detachments of the former Central Asian Border District located in the Republic of Tajikistan, was also under Russian jurisdiction for a long period due to the Civil War.

On November 20, 2004, the Murghab Border Detachment of the former Eastern District was transferred to the Armed Forces of the Republic of Tajikistan.

== Units in 1991 ==
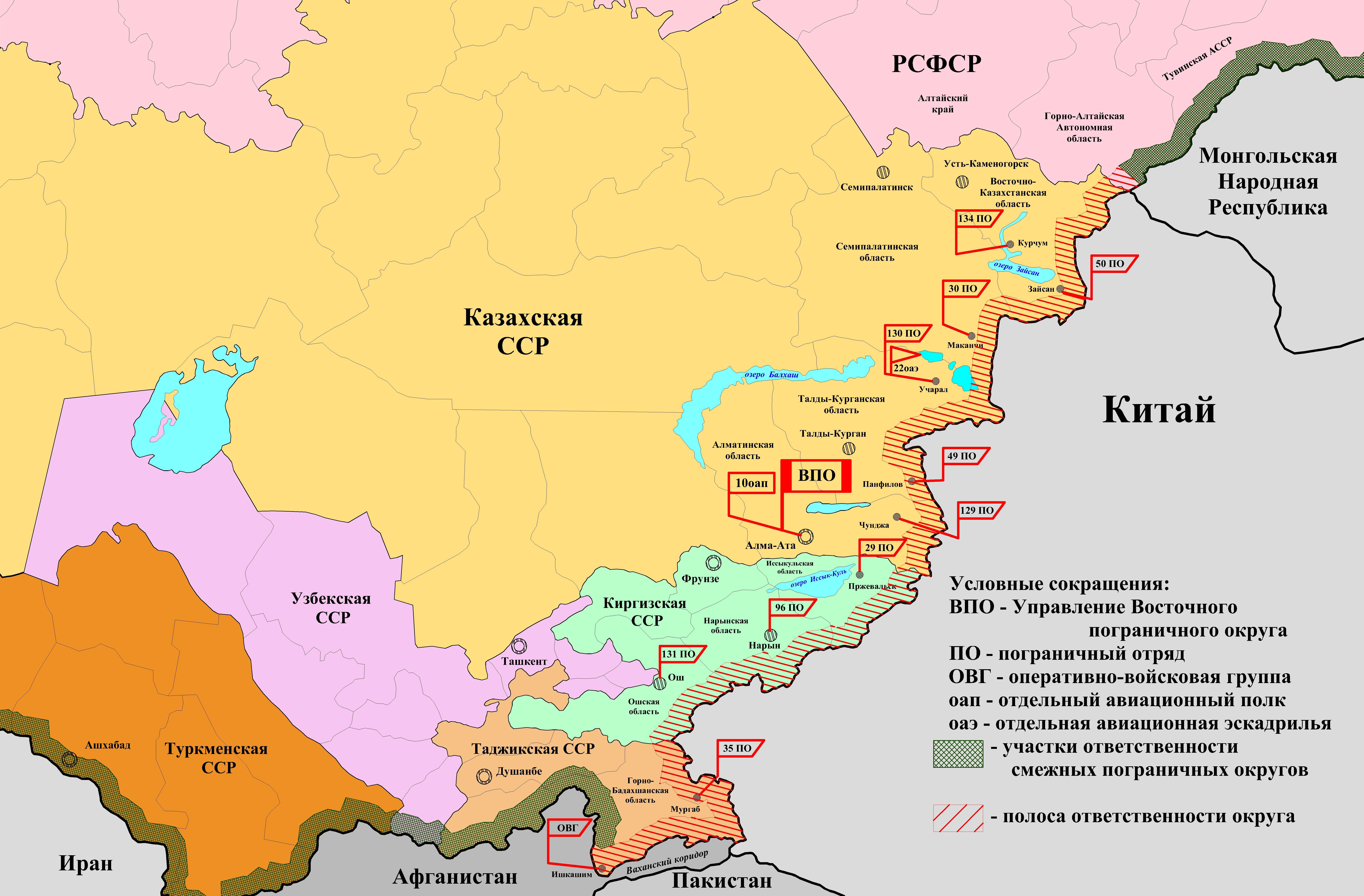
Map of the Detachments of the Eastern Border District 1991.

In 1991 the Border Troops numbered ten Border Districts. The troops of the Eastern Border District included:

Land units:

- 134th Kurchumskiy Border Detachment (134-й ПОГО) — Kurshim, Kazakh SSR
- 50th Zaysanskiy Краснознаменный Border Detachment (50-й ПОГО) — Zaysan, Kazakh SSR
- 30th Makanchinskiy Краснознаменный Border Detachment (30-й ПОГО) — Makanchi, Kazakh SSR
- 130th Uch-Aaralskiy Border Detachment (130-й ПОГО) — Usharal, Kazakh SSR
- 49th Panfilovskiy Краснознаменный Border Detachment (49-й ПОГО) — Zharkent, Kazakh SSR
- 132nd Chundzhinskiy Border Detachment (132-й ПОГО) — Chundzha, Kazakh SSR
- 29th Przhevalskiy Border Detachment (29-й ПОГО) — Karakol, Kirghiz SSR
- 96th Narynskiy Border Detachment (96-й ПОГО) — Naryn, Kirghiz SSR
- 131st Oshskiy Border Detachment (131-й ПОГО) — Osh, Kirghiz SSR
- 35th Murghabskiy Border Detachment (35-й ПОГО) — Murghab, Tajik SSR
- 10th Separate Aviation Regiment (10-й ОАП) — Almaty – Burunday Airfield
- 22nd Separate Aviation Squadron (22-я ОАЭ) — Usharal Airfield
