= EERE =

EERE may refer to:

- Office of Energy Efficiency and Renewable Energy
- Rakvere Airfield (ICAO airport code)
