= Eduard Shemyakov =

Ukrainian-born Russian serial killer (b. 1975)

- Born: Eduard Vasilyevich Shemyakov; 30 September 1975 (age 51); Ignatpol, Zhytomyr Oblast, UkSSR, Soviet Union
- Other names: "The Resort Maniac" "Bloody Eddie"
- Conviction: Murder
- Penalty: Compulsory treatment

Details
- Victims: 10
- Span of crimes: 1996–1998
- Country: Russia
- State: St. Petersburg
- Date apprehended: 1998

Eduard Vasilyevich Shemyakov (Russian: Эдуа́рд Васи́льевич Шемяко́в; born 30 September 1975), known as the Resort Maniac (Russian: Курортный маньяк, romanized: Kurortny manyak), is a Ukrainian-born Russian serial killer who killed 10 people and attempted to kill 2 others in St. Petersburg between 1996 and 1998. Before the murders, he always raped his victims, and always killed with particular cruelty, dismembering and decapitating bodies. In at least one case, cannibalism was involved.

== Biography ==
Shemyakov was born in 1975. After school, he joined the army and served with the border troops in the town of Kuvshinskaya Salma. According to some reports, he was bullied by senior officials while in the army. Upon returning home to St. Petersburg he worked as a security guard and was fond of computer equipment. In his private life, however, Shemyakov had problems such as experiencing frequent headaches and having trouble socializing with girls. He also lived with his parents.

After seeing the film "The Dawns Here Are Quiet", Shemyakov decided that he wanted to kill women. The film, most likely, had nothing to do with it, but it is believed that it influenced him through imprinting. Shemyakov committed all of his murders on the outskirts of St. Petersburg or outside the city, his youngest victim being 11 years old. In two cases, the assault did not end with murder - in the first case, Shemyakov was scared off by a passer-by, and in the second he released the victim voluntarily and asked her to inform the police of his deeds, probably realising the danger he posed. The killer was caught after killing his sister's girlfriend. Shemyakov's mother also found in her refrigerator a half-eaten piece of human meat. She called the police, and upon returning home Shemyakov was arrested by the police. Although he was warned by a neighbour about the ambush in his apartment, he said that he did not care and went right into the hands of the authorities.

Experts diagnosed Shemyakov with paranoid schizophrenia (he himself said that he was ordered to "kill the people and drown their heads" by "eyes in the water"). As a result, he was found insane and sentenced to compulsory treatment in a psychiatric hospital in 2002. Relatives of the victims repeatedly tried to appeal the court's decision, but the verdict has remained unchanged.

== See also ==
- List of Russian serial killers
- List of serial killers by number of victims
