= Red Banner Baltic Border District =

Red Banner Baltic Border Guard District (Краснознаменный Прибалтийский пограничный округ (КППО))
- Active: October 23 1975 - September 2, 1992
- Country: Soviet Union
- Role: Guarding the USSR State Border
- Part of: KGB Border Guards

The Red Banner Baltic Border Guard District (Russian: Краснознаменный Прибалтийский пограничный округ (КППО)) was a military formation of the Soviet Border Troops.

On October 23, 1975, the District was formed on the basis of the border guard forces of the Northwestern Border Guard District located in the territories of the Estonian SSR, the Latvian SSR, the Lithuanian SSR and the Kaliningrad Oblast, which guarded the state border from the Polish People's Republic border, along the Baltic Sea, the Gulf of Riga and the Gulf of Finland coast. The headquarters of the Border Guard District was located in Riga, Latvian SSR.

The activities of the Border Guard were based on the USSR Law "On the State Border of the USSR."

The district was disbanded on 2 September 1992. The border units and activities in the Kaliningrad Oblast, were transferred to the Kaliningrad Group of Border Forces.

== Units and formations ==
The Red Banner Baltic Sea Border Guard District of the Main Directorate of Border Guard Troops of the Committee for State Security (KGB) consisted of six detachments, including the 106th Tallinn (Таллинский ПО), Rakvere (Раквереский ПО) and Kuressaare (Кингисеппский ПО) detachments in the Estonian territory, and in addition to them the 23rd border guard detachment (s/o 2114) in Klaipėda, 95th border guard detachment (s/o 2297) in Kaliningrad. The district headquarters (s/o 2582) and commandant's office (s/o 9826) were located in Riga.

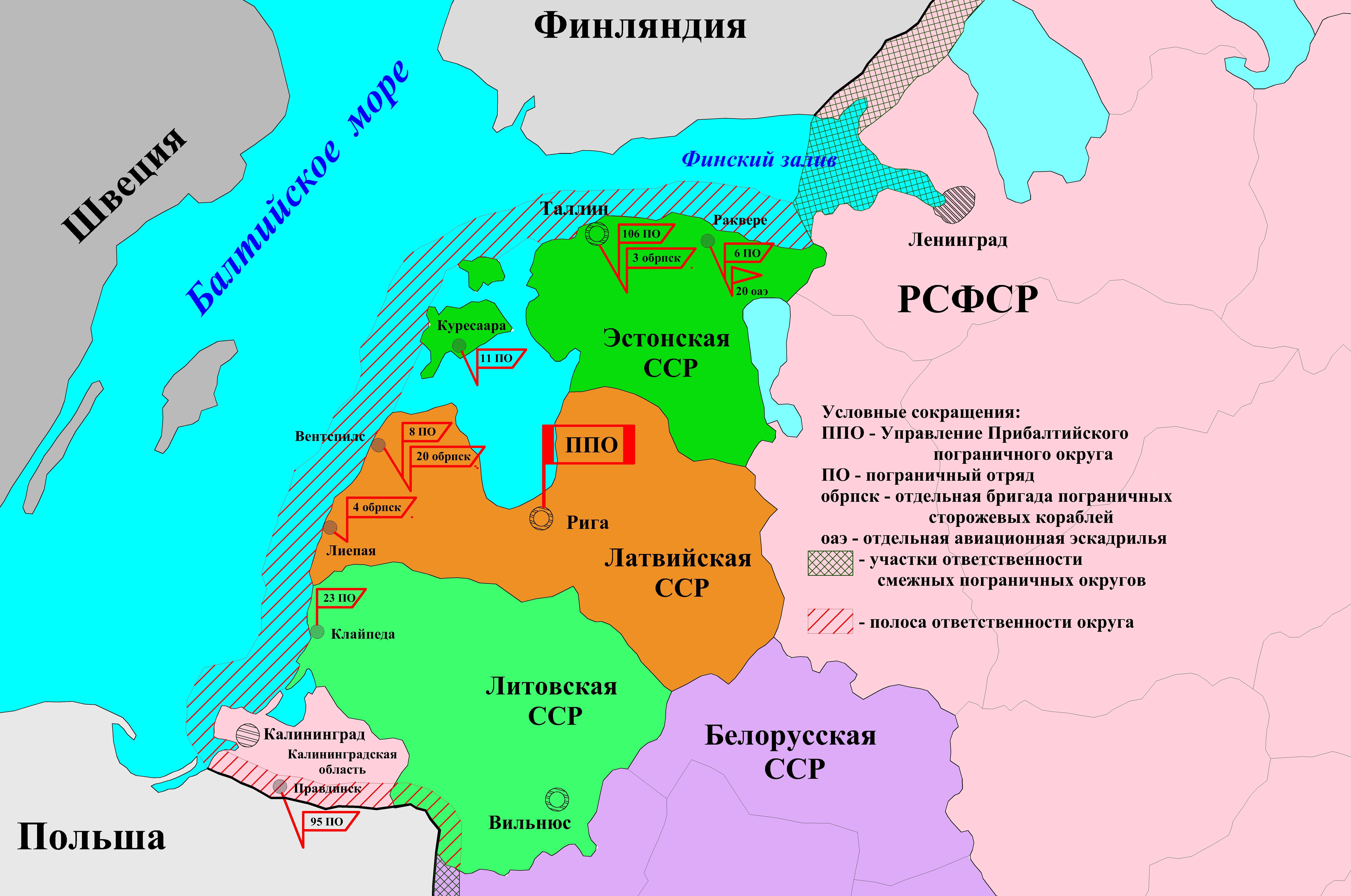
Territory of the Baltic Border Guard District

Baltic Border Guard District, Riga Latvian SSR (v/ch 2582)

  - Command Office of the Border Guard District (Комендатура управление округа (в/ч 9826), Riga Latvian SSR
- 106th Tallinn (Таллинский ПО), Rakvere (Раквереский ПО) and Kuressaare (Кингисеппский ПО) detachments in the Estonian territory
- 8th border guard detachment (8-й Вентспилсский пограничный остракт (в/ч 2335), Pāvilosta Ventspils Latvian SSR
- 23rd border guard detachment (23-й Клайпедский пограничный остракт (в/ч 2114), Klaipėda Lithuanian SSR
- 95th. border guard detachment 2297, Pravdinsk, Kaliningrad Oblast
- Independent border checkpoint of Kaliningrad
- Riga Independent Border Checkpoint (Отдельный контрольно-пропускной пункт «Рига»)
- Vilnius's Independent border checkpoint (Отдельный контрольно-пропускной пункт «Вильнюс»)
- 3rd Independent Brigade of border guard ships (3-я отдельная ордена Красной звезды бригад пограничных сторожевых кораблей в/ч 2243), in Tallinn Kopli Lõunasadamas
- 4th Independent Brigade of border guard ships (4-я отдельная бригад пограничных сторожевых кораблей (в/ч 2395), Liepāja Latvian SSR
- 20th Independent Brigade of border guard patrol boats (20-я отдельная бригад пограничных сторожевых кораблей (в/ч 9864), Ventspils Latvian SSR
- 20th Independent Aviation Squadron (20-я отдельная авиационная ескадрилья (в/ч 9788), Rakvere Estonian SSR
- 126th independent border guard communications battalion (126-й отдельный одрена Красной Звезды батальон связи (в/ч 9831), Riga Latvian SSR
- District Military Hospital (Окружной военный хостипаль (в/ч 2515), Kaunas Lithuanian SSR
- Military warehouse (Военный склад (в/ч 2442), Riga and Tallinn

== Commanders of the Baltic Border Guard Troops 1975−1991 ==
Date	Name	Ruwiki	Rank
1975–1976	Konstantin Sekretaryov (1919−1989)	ru:Секретарёв, Константин Фёдорович	Lieutenant General
1976–1980	Ilya Kalinichenko (1931−1997)	ru:Калиниченко, Илья Яковлевич	Major General (since 1980 Lieutenant General)
1980–1986	Grigori Fyodorovich Moiseyenko (born 1925)		Major General
1986–1991	Valentin Konstantinovich Gaponenko (1929−2018)		lieutenant general
