= Rakvere Airfield =

Airfield in Estonia

Rakvere Airfield Rakvere lennuväli
- IATA: none; ICAO: EERE

Summary
- Coordinates: 59°21′53″N 26°21′33″E

Maps
- Location in Estonia
- Location in Rakvere

Runways
Direction	Length		Surface
Direction	ft	m	Surface
			Asphalt/concrete

Rakvere Airfield (Estonian: Rakvere lennuväli) is an airfield in Rakvere, Lääne-Viru County, Estonia.

The airfield was built in the 1920s. During the Second World War the airfield was used by the German Luftwaffe.

During the Estonian Soviet Socialist Republic Soviet occupation it was used by the Soviet Air Forces, with ground-attack and transport aircraft, and by the KGB Border Guard. From July 1945 to 1954, units of the 277th Assault Aviation Krasnoselskaya Red Banner Orders of Suvorov and Kutuzov Division, Soviet Air Forces, were based at the airfield flying Ilyushin Il-2 and Il-10 aircraft. In 1954, both regiments were relocated to the Pribylovo airfield (Leningrad Oblast).

From August 1946 to January 1947, the 566th Transport Aviation Regiment was formed at the base. It was established from the 566th Assault Aviation Regiment 277th Assault Aviation Division, consisting of 20 crews on Po-2, Li-2 aircraft and gliders. The formation of the regiment was completed by January 1, 1947. The regiment became part of the 281st Novgorod Transport Aviation Division, reformed from the 281st Assault Aviation Division.

The airfield was then transferred to the Rakvere Order of the Red Star 6th Border Detachment of the Baltic Border District (military unit 2294); the 20th Separate Air Squadron (military unit 9788), 12 Mi-8T helicopters were based here. The barracks area — headquarters, barracks, canteens, garages and some other auxiliary premises of military unit 9788 — was located within the city of Rakvere. The airfield housed service and technical buildings (RTO facilities, TEC, fuel and lubricant warehouses, boxes of airfield technical support units). The airfield was supplied with electricity by two mobile power plants.

Flights to protect the state border were carried out daily. One helicopter was assigned on a rotational basis to the 9th Border Detachment and was stationed on the island of Saaremaa. The aircraft returned to the base for routine maintenance, and was replaced by another one. The panorama of the airfield is shown in the feature film "Alarm Flight". Officers of the unit starred in episodes of the film. The personnel of military unit 9788 included, in particular, more than 250 conscript soldiers and sergeants

In the beginning of 1990s, the airfield was abandoned. In the initiative of private pilots, the airfield is reopened since 2004.
