= Dzhalinda =

Dzhalinda Джалинда
- Selo
- Location within Amur Oblast Location within Russia
- Coordinates: 53°29′N 123°53′E
- Country: Russia
- Region: Amur Oblast
- District: Skovorodinsky District
- Time zone: UTC+9:00

Dzhalinda (Russian: Джалинда) is a rural locality (a selo) and the administrative center of Dzhalindinsky Selsoviet of Skovorodinsky District, Amur Oblast, Russia. The population was 1,123 as of 2018. There are 20 streets.

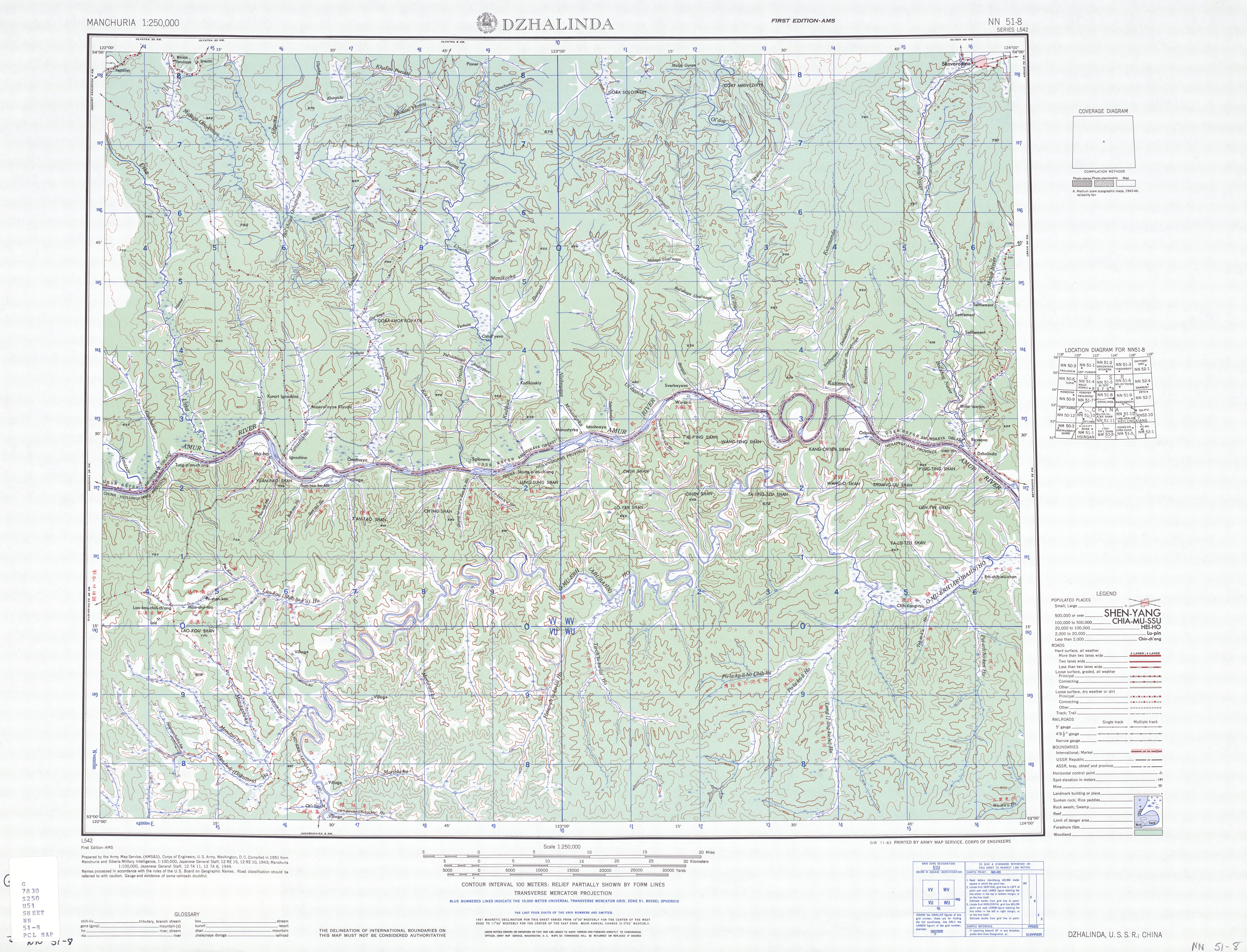
Dzhalinda (1951)

== Geography ==
Dzhalinda is located on the Amur River, 70 km south of Skovorodino (the district's administrative centre) by road. Albazino is the nearest rural locality. Dzhalinda is near the border with China.
