= Burunday =

- Location in Kazakhstan
- Coordinates: 43°21′37″N 77°51′28″E
- Country: Kazakhstan
- Region: Almaty Region
- Time zone: UTC+6 (Omsk Time)

Burunday is a village in the Almaty Region of south-eastern Kazakhstan.
