= Kurshim =

- Location within Kazakhstan
- Coordinates: 48°34′20″N 83°39′15″E
- Country: Kazakhstan
- Region: East Kazakhstan
- District: Kurshim

Population (2009)
  - Total: 8,490
- Time zone: UTC+6 (+6)

Kurshim, also Kurchum or Kurchim (Kazakh: Күршім, Kürşım) is a selo and administrative center of Kurshim District of East Kazakhstan Region, Kazakhstan. Population: 8,490 (2009 census results); 10,502 (1999 census results).

The Kurchum River flows past the town and Lake Zaysan lies to the south. The town lies on the road between the villages of Altyn Kala to the north-west and Surulen to the east; this road connects with the M38 road in the southeast which leads to Jeminay across the Chinese border in Xinjiang. The town is served by a small airport, Kurchum Airport, and Antonov An-2 biplanes fly in and out of the airport. In late 1989 or early 1990 the town was affected by an earthquake which destroyed the Kurchum Hospital, amongst other buildings. The landscape around the town is dominated by estuarine plains.

== Climate ==
Kurshim has a hot-summer humid continental climate (Dfa) according to the Köppen climate classification.

Climate data for Kurshim (1991–2020)
Month	Jan	Feb	Mar	Apr	May	Jun	Jul	Aug	Sep	Oct	Nov	Dec	Year
Mean daily maximum °C (°F)	−12.7 (9.1)	−9.2 (15.4)	0.2 (32.4)	15.4 (59.7)	22.3 (72.1)	27.6 (81.7)	29.5 (85.1)	28.4 (83.1)	22.1 (71.8)	13.4 (56.1)	1.2 (34.2)	−8.9 (16.0)	10.8 (51.4)
Daily mean °C (°F)	−18.8 (−1.8)	−16.0 (3.2)	−6.2 (20.8)	8.0 (46.4)	14.8 (58.6)	20.2 (68.4)	22.1 (71.8)	20.4 (68.7)	13.8 (56.8)	6.1 (43.0)	−4.7 (23.5)	−14.5 (5.9)	3.8 (38.8)
Mean daily minimum °C (°F)	−24.5 (−12.1)	−22.5 (−8.5)	−12.4 (9.7)	0.9 (33.6)	7.0 (44.6)	12.5 (54.5)	14.8 (58.6)	12.4 (54.3)	6.0 (42.8)	−0.3 (31.5)	−9.7 (14.5)	−19.9 (−3.8)	−3.0 (26.6)
Average precipitation mm (inches)	17.9 (0.70)	14.2 (0.56)	14.9 (0.59)	20.0 (0.79)	24.2 (0.95)	25.3 (1.00)	25.3 (1.00)	18.8 (0.74)	17.8 (0.70)	26.2 (1.03)	27.7 (1.09)	24.6 (0.97)	256.9 (10.11)
Average precipitation days (≥ 1.0 mm)	5.1	4.5	4.1	4.5	4.8	5.0	5.1	3.2	3.7	5.4	6.4	6.2	58.0
Source: NOAA
