= Kuvshinskaya Salma =

Kuvshinskaya Salma Кувшинская Салма
- Inhabited locality
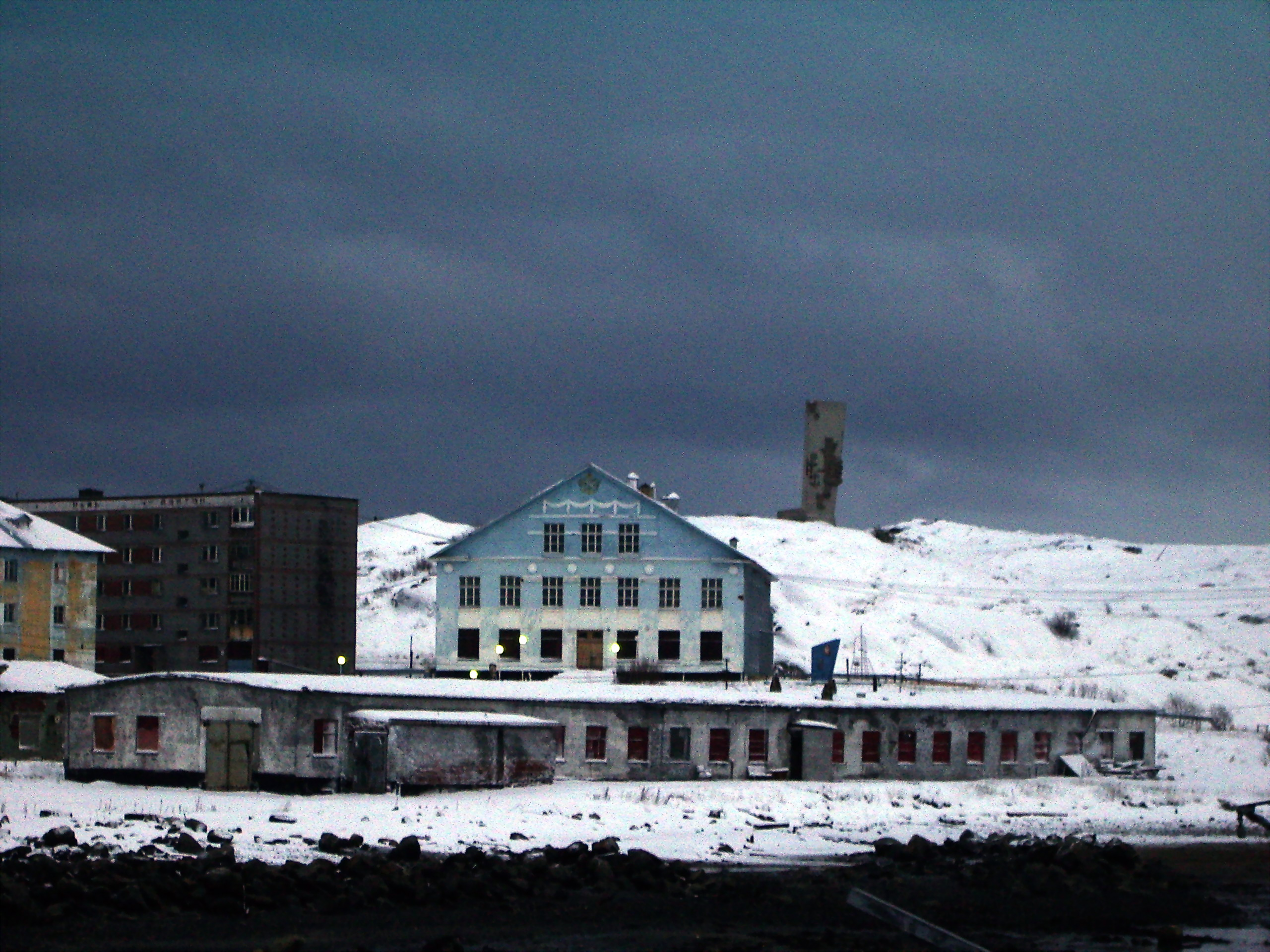
- House of Culture in Kuvshinskaya Salma

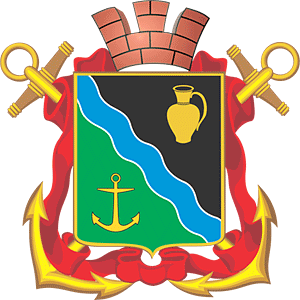
- Coat of arms
- Interactive map of Kuvshinskaya Salma
- Location of Kuvshinskaya Salma Kuvshinskaya Salma (Murmansk Oblast)
- Coordinates: 69°19′N 33°25′E
- Country: Russia
- Federal subject: Murmansk Oblast
- Founded: 1921

Population (2010 Census)
  - Total: 0
  - Estimate (2010): 0 )

Administrative status
  - Subordinated to: Closed Administrative-Territorial Formation of Alexandrovsk

Municipal status
  - Urban okrug: Alexandrovsk Urban Okrug
- Time zone: UTC+3 (MSK)
- Postal code: 184670
- OKTMO ID: 47737000106

Kuvshinskaya Salma (Russian: Кувшинская Салма) is a rural locality (an inhabited locality) in administrative jurisdiction of the closed administrative-territorial formation of Alexandrovsk in Murmansk Oblast, Russia, located beyond the Arctic Circle at the height of 1 meter (3 ft 3 in) above sea level. As of the 2010 Census, it had no recorded population.
