= Alexander Pavlovsky =

Belarusian military officer

- Аляксандр Паўлоўскі

Chairman of the State Border Committee
- In office 4 September 1996 – 10 April 2007
- President: Alexander Lukashenko
- Preceded by: Vasily Morkovkin
- Succeeded by: Igor Rachkovsky

Personal details
- Born: 14 February 1950 (age 76) Golitsyno, Moscow Oblast, Russian SFSR, Soviet Union
- Education: Kazan Higher Tank Command School; Malinovsky Military Armored Forces Academy; Military Academy of the General Staff of the Armed Forces of Russia

Military service
- Allegiance: Soviet Union; Belarus
- Branch/service: Soviet Army; Armed Forces of Belarus; Border Guard Service of Belarus
- Years of service: 1971–2007
- Rank: Lieutenant general
- Awards: Medal "For Distinction in the Protection of the State Borders"; Order of Friendship; Order "For Service to the Motherland"

Alexander Alekseyevich Pavlovsky (Russian: Александр Алексеевич Павловский; born 14 February 1950) is a Belarusian lieutenant general who served as chairman of the State Border Committee of the Republic of Belarus from 1996 to 2007.

Born into a military family in Russia, Pavlovsky served in the Red Army, first in the Moscow Military District and, from 1979, in the Byelorussian SSR. He participated in the creation of the military of independent Belarus and was transferred to the border troops in 1996. After his dismissal in 2007, he served as the Belarusian ambassador to France from 2008 to 2012 and later worked as a consultant in the Belarusian military sector. Pavlovsky also appeared as an expert in Belarusian state media, where he commented on international affairs.

== Early life and education ==
Alexander Pavlovsky was born on 14 February 1950 in Golitsyno, in the Moscow Oblast of the Russian SFSR. He came from a military family with a history of service, including ancestors who fought in the Russo-Japanese War. His great-grandfather was the chief postmaster of the Grodno Governorate. Pavlovsky spent his childhood moving around, spending some of that time in Belarus. His brother also pursued a military career.

In 1971, Pavlovsky graduated from the Kazan Higher Tank Command School. He then graduated from the Malinovsky Military Armored Forces Academy in 1978 and the Military Academy of the General Staff of the Armed Forces of Russia in 1996.

In 2005, Alexander Pavlovsky received a Doctor of Sciences degree in military studies.

== Career ==
After his graduation in 1971, Pavlovsky served in tank forces in the Moscow Military District. He started as a platoon leader and rose to the position of Deputy Chief of Staff of a Tank Regiment. In 1979, he was transferred to Belarus, where his service was interrupted by a period as a military adviser in Algeria from 1981 to 1984. In Belarus, he rose to the position of Commander of a Tank Division in Grodno. He was the first in Belarus to reorganize a division into a brigade, a reform that served as a model for other Belarusian military units.

Pavlovsky's experience in military reform led to his appointment as Border Guard chairman on 4 September 1996. As an outsider to the field, he was forced to learn on the fly. In 1998, he was promoted to the rank of lieutenant general and received the banner of the Soviet Western Border District, which had been centered in Kiev during the Soviet era. Under his leadership, Belarus began the demarcation of its borders with Latvia and Lithuania. Part of the funding for this project was obtained from the European Union via the TACIS program; Pavlovsky explicitly linked the funding with Belarus preventing refugees from passing into Europe. In 2004, the Border Guard opened a memorial complex to border troops in Grodno, which as of 2016 was unique in Belarus. It was funded by contributions from border troops, without government funding. In 2003, the Belarusian border guard signed a cooperation agreement with the Belarusian Orthodox Church.

Pavlovsky was dismissed from his position on 10 April 2007. According to the Russian newspaper Komsomolskaya Pravda, this came as a surprise to him. In 2008, he was appointed as the Belarusian ambassador to France and the Belarusian representative at UNESCO. In the same year, he received a concurrent appointment as ambassador to Spain and Portugal. He was dismissed from all these positions in 2012 and returned to Belarus.

Pavlovsky then began work as a chief consultant in an LLC enterprise connected to the military sector. He gave interviews to Belarusian media, commenting on issues such as the Zapad 2017 military exercise and the 2020–2021 Belarusian protests, which he claimed were due to an information war waged by the West against Belarus. On the Russian invasion of Ukraine, he stated that Russia had no option but to invade but must now fight until Ukraine's unconditional surrender.

== Personal life ==
Pavlovsky is married and has a son and a daughter.

== Awards ==
- Medal "For Distinction in the Protection of the State Borders" (Russia, 1998)
- Order of Friendship (Russia, 2003)
- Third degree order "For Service to the Motherland"(Belarus)
- Honorary Diploma of the National Assembly (Belarus, 2003)
- Honorary Diploma of the Council of Ministers (Belarus, 2010)
