= Mikhail Golovatov =

Russian intelligence officer (1949–2022)

- Михаил Головатов
- Born: Mikhail Vasilyevich Golovatov; 23 August 1949; Mukovnin, Kletsky District, Stalingrad Oblast, Russian SFSR, USSR
- Died: 1 August 2022 (aged 72); Sochi, Krasnodar Krai, Russia
- Occupation: Intelligence officer

Mikhail Vasilyevich Golovatov (Russian: Михаил Васильевич Головатов; 23 August 1949 – 1 August 2022) was a Russian intelligence officer.

In 1965, Golovatov enrolled at the N. N. Godovikov Moscow Aviation College. He worked at the Moscow Fire Department until 1972. Golovatov was a member of the sports and fitness society Dynamo Sports Club from 1965 to 1971. He worked with the KGB. In 1984, Golovatov was dispatched to Khabarovsk, where he established the regional branch of the KGB's Alpha Group. He was later commander of Alpha Group.

In 2011, Golovatov was arrested at Vienna International Airport by Austrian police, having been placed on the European Arrest Warrant by Lithuania for his role in the events of 13 January 1991. The Lithuanian government was informed, but Austrian authorities released him within 24 hours, claiming that the information provided by Lithuania was "too vague". Former Estonian President Toomas Hendrik Ilves has more than once accused the then-Austrian Foreign Minister, Michael Spindelegger, of personally intervening in the case with the Austrian border police in order to please the Russian government.

On 27 March 2019, the District Court of Vilnius found Golovatov guilty of war crimes and crimes against humanity for his role in the events of 13 January 1991. The panel of three judges sentenced Golovatov in absentia to 12 years in prison. Lithuania requested the extradition of both Golovatov and Dmitry Yazov, but the Russian government refused claiming that the charges were politically motivated.

Over his career, Golovatov received a number of medals and awards, including the title of Master of Sports of the USSR, Order of Honour, Order "For Personal Courage" of Belarus, Order of the Red Star, Medal "For Courage" of Russia and Order of the Red Banner.

Golovatov died in August 2022, at the age of 72, at his house in Sochi.
