= Anatoly Mikhaylov (radiologist) =

Belarusian radiologist (1936–2026)

- Анатоль Міхайлаў (Belarusian); Анатолий Михайлов (Russian)
- Born: 3 November 1936; Indykava, Byelorussian SSR, Soviet Union
- Died: 14 August 2026 (aged 89)
- Education: Vitebsk Medical Institute
- Occupation: Radiologist
- Awards: State Prize of the Republic of Belarus (1992); Francysk Skaryna Medal (2021); Honoured Scientist of the Republic of Belarus (2026)

Anatoly Nikolayevich Mikhaylov (Note: Belarusian: Анатоль Мікалаевіч Міхайлаў, Russian: Анатолий Николаевич Михайлов) (3 November 1936 – 14 August 2026) was a Belarusian radiologist who served as head of the radiology department at the Belarusian State Institute for Advanced Medical Education from 1977 until his death in 2026.

He became an academician of the National Academy of Sciences of Belarus in 2003.

== Life and career ==
Mikhaylov was born on 3 November 1936 in the village of Indykava in Vitebsk district, then part of the Byelorussian SSR. He graduated from Vitebsk Secondary School No. 29 with a gold medal in 1955, and completed his medical studies at the Vitebsk Medical Institute in 1961. Mikhaylov worked as a deputy chief physician in Ivanava district for a year before briefly working as an epidemiologist in 1962. Later that year, he began working as a radiologist at a departmental hospital in Gomel.

In 1966, Mikhaylov joined the Belarusian State Institute for Advanced Medical Education as a postgraduate student. He later worked there as an assistant and associate professor. Mikhaylov successfully defended his doctoral dissertation in 1974. He was appointed as head of the radiology department at the institute in 1977 and became a professor in 1980.

Mikhaylov's research covered several areas of medicine, including cardiology, pulmonology and gastroenterology. He developed a new concept of intestinal dyskinesia, which formed the basis for new methods of treating digestive dysfunction with medication. Mikhaylov and his students also developed a method for assessing gastrointestinal function that reduced examination time from 6–12 hours to 1.5 hours and lowered radiation exposure. He also worked on computer diagnostic systems and medical imaging methods.

Mikhaylov published more than 850 scientific works, including 43 monographs, and was granted 50 patents for inventions. He also trained 100 clinical residents and 63 postgraduate students, 52 of whom received the Candidate of Medical Sciences degree and 10 the Doctor of Medical Sciences degree.

Mikhaylov and his co-authors received the State Prize of the Republic of Belarus in 1992 for developing and introducing new diagnostic and treatment methods in vascular surgery. In 1996, he was elected a corresponding member of the National Academy of Sciences of Belarus, becoming an academician in 2003. He was awarded the Francysk Skaryna Medal in September 2021 and the honorary title of Honoured Scientist of the Republic of Belarus in July 2026.

Mikhaylov died on 14 August 2026, at the age of 89.
