= Albert Likhanov =

Russian writer and politician (1935–2021)

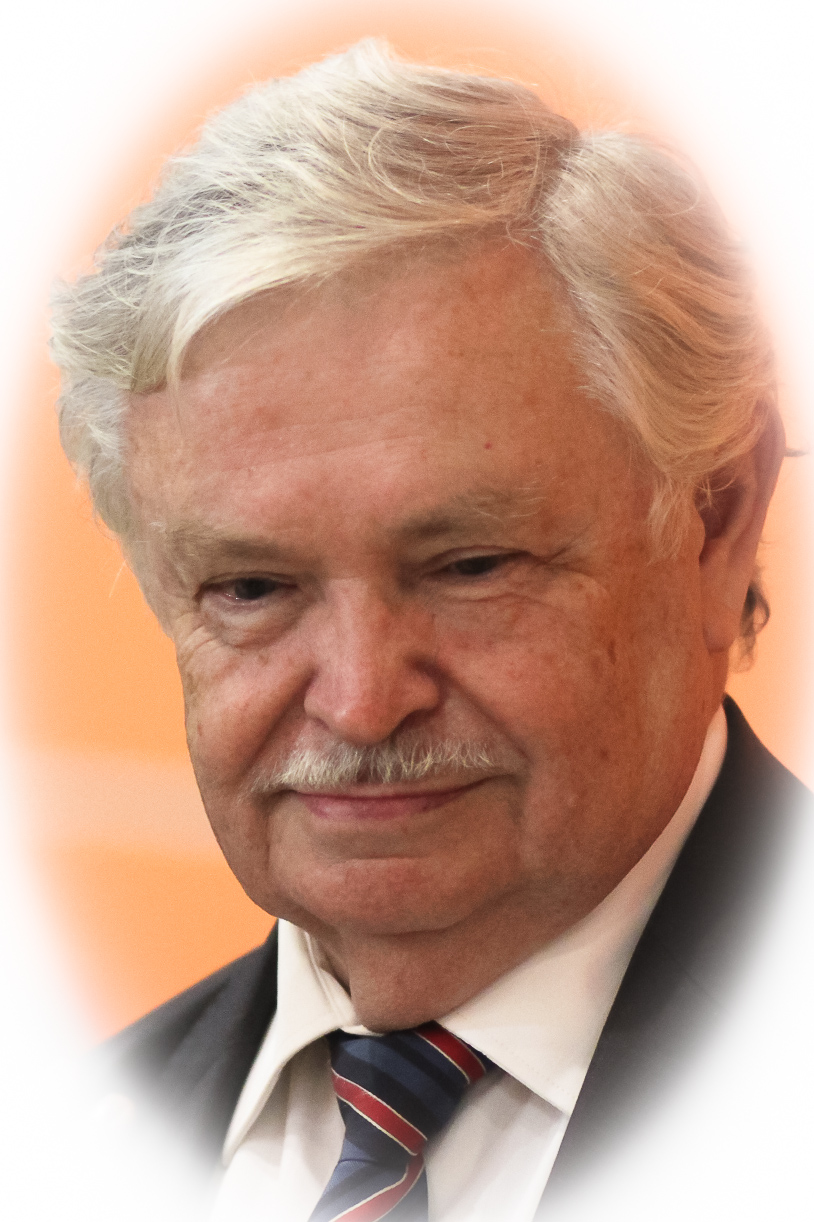

Member of the State Duma
- In office 1993–1999

Personal details
- Born: Albert Anatolyevich Likhanov; 13 September 1935 Kirov, Russian SFSR, Soviet Union
- Died: 25 December 2021 (aged 86) Moscow, Russia
- Occupation: Writer

Albert Anatolyevich Likhanov (Russian: Альбе́рт Анато́льевич Лиха́нов; 13 September 1935 – 25 December 2021) was a Soviet and Russian writer and politician. A children's writer, he also served in the Congress of People's Deputies of the Soviet Union.

Likhanov died on 25 December 2021, at the age of 86, from COVID-19.

== Filmography ==
- Moy general (1979)
- Blagie namereniya (1984)
- Team 33 (1987)
- Posledniye kholoda (1993)

== Awards ==
- Order "For Merit to the Fatherland"
- Order of Honour
- Order of Friendship
- Order of the Red Banner of Labour
- Order of the Badge of Honour
- Medal "In Commemoration of the 850th Anniversary of Moscow"
- Medal "For Labour Valour"
- Jubilee Medal "In Commemoration of the 100th Anniversary of the Birth of Vladimir Ilyich Lenin"
- Medal "For Construction of the Baikal-Amur Railway"
- Medal "Veteran of Labour"
- Order of Merit of Ukraine
- Order of Francysk Skaryna
- Francysk Skaryna Medal
- Dostlug Order
- Order of Honour of Georgia
- Order of Saints Cyril and Methodius
- Order of Honour of South Ossetia
- Order of Friendship of South Ossetia
- N.K. Krupskaya's state award
- Lenin Komsomol Prize
- Order of Holy Prince Daniel of Moscow
- Order of St. Sergius of Radonezh
- Order of St. Seraphim of Sarov
- Prix Bounine

== Works ==
- Лиханов А. А. (1971)
- Вальбе Р. Б. (1978)
- Скоробогач Т. Л. (1997)
- Аннинский Л. (2012)
