= Alexander Boechko =

Belarusian military officer

- Аляксандр Боечка

Chairman of the State Border Committee
- In office 2 August 2012 – 2 November 2013
- President: Alexander Lukashenko
- Preceded by: Igor Rachkovsky
- Succeeded by: Leonid Maltsev

Personal details
- Born: 1965 (age 60–61) Novohrad-Volynskyi Raion, Zhytomyr Oblast, Ukrainian SSR, Soviet Union
- Education: Tbilisi Higher Artillery Command School; FSB Border Academy; Military Academy of the General Staff of the Armed Forces of Russia

Military service
- Allegiance: Soviet Union; Belarus
- Branch/service: Soviet Border Troops; Border Guard Service of Belarus
- Rank: Colonel
- Battles/wars: Soviet–Afghan War
- Awards: Order of the Red Banner; Medal "For Battle Merit"

Alexander Dmitrievich Boechko (Russian: Александр Дмитриевич Боечко; born 1965) is a Belarusian military officer who served as chairman of the State Border Committee of the Republic of Belarus from August 2012 to November 2013.

== Early life and education ==
Alexander Boechko was born in 1965 in the Novohrad-Volynskyi Raion of the Zhytomyr Oblast of the Ukrainian SSR.

In 1986, he graduated from the Tbilisi Higher Artillery Command School in Georgia. He also graduated from the FSB Border Academy in 1999 and the Military Academy of the General Staff of the Armed Forces of Russia in 2009.

== Career ==
After graduation in 1986, Boechko was initially assigned to the Eastern Border District. However, less than ten days later, he was offered the opportunity to join the war in Afghanistan, where he served for two and a half years. During this time, he rose to the rank of senior lieutenant and commanded a battery.

After the war, Boechko served in the Border Guard Service of Belarus, first in the Grodno and then the Lida Border Groups. After briefly serving in the central apparatus of the border guard, he was appointed head of the Lida Border Group in 2002. In 2007, he returned to service in Minsk.

On 2 August 2012, Alexander Lukashenko appointed him as the chairman of the State Border Committee after the previous chairman was dismissed. This dismissal followed an incident where a light aircraft operated by a Swedish public relations firm entered Belarusian airspace unopposed. Candidacy of Boechko was supported by former Minister of Defense, Leonid Maltsev. However, the president was unhappy with his performance and fired him on 2 November 2012. Opposition media linked his dismissal to the crash of a Belarusian An-2 less than a month earlier in the Zhytomyr Oblast of Ukraine, which was reportedly involved in cigarette smuggling.

During his tenure, Belarus finalized its border with Latvia in 2013.

In 2014, Boechko was appointed as the border representative to the CIS Executive Committee. He held this position until 2023, when he was replaced by another former chairman of the Belarusian border guard, Anatoly Lappo. He has held the rank of colonel since 2003.

== Personal life ==
Alexander Boechko is married and has two sons.

== Awards ==
- Medal "For Battle Merit" (Soviet Union, 1987)
- Order of the Red Banner (Soviet Union, 1988)
