= Anatoly Lappo =

Belarusian military officer & politician

- Анатоль Лапо
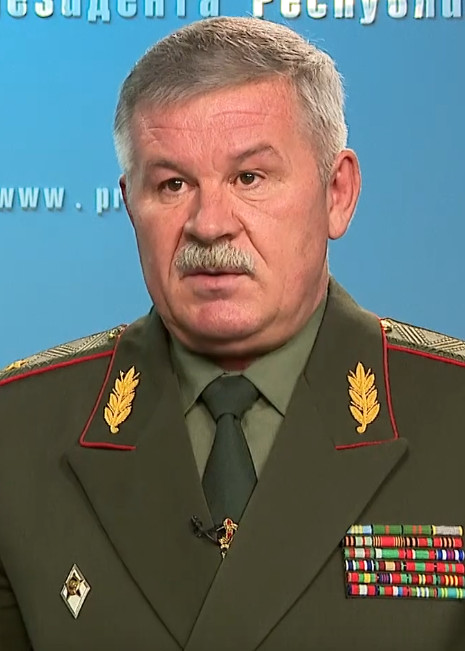
- Lappo in 2019

Chairman of the State Border Committee
- In office 29 December 2016 – 30 May 2023
- President: Alexander Lukashenko
- Preceded by: Leonid Maltsev
- Succeeded by: Konstantin Molostov

Personal details
- Born: 24 May 1963 (age 63) Kulakovka, Byalynichy district, Mogilev region, Byelorussian SSR, Soviet Union
- Education: Golitsyno Border Institute of the FSB of the Russian Federation; FSB Border Academy
- Awards: Order "For Service to the Motherland"

Military service
- Allegiance: Soviet Union; Belarus
- Branch/service: Soviet Border Troops; Border Guard Service of Belarus
- Rank: Lieutenant general

Anatoly Petrovich Lappo (Belarusian: Анатоль Пятровіч Лапо, romanized: Anatol Piatrovič Łapo, Russian: Анатолий Петрович Лаппо; born 24 May 1963) is a Belarusian military officer who served as chairman of the State Border Committee of the Republic of Belarus from 2016 to 2023.

He oversaw the border during Belarus–European Union border crisis and was sanctioned by the USA and the EU.

== Early life and education ==
Anatoly Lappo was born in the village of Kulakovo in the Mogilev region, Belarus, to a family of a teacher and a driver. When he was ten, his family moved to Mogilev.

In 1986, he graduated from the Border Institute of the KGB of the Soviet Union and from the FSB Border Academy in 2001.

== Career ==
Anatoly Lappo started his service after graduation in the Transcaucasian Border District and participated in the withdrawal of Soviet troops from Azerbaijan. He called that time one of the hardest in his life.

In 1992, Lappo returned to Belarus to serve in the newly created Smorgon Border Group, becoming its commander in 2004. In 2008, he was transferred to the operational department of the Border Service. He was later promoted to its deputy head and then to its first deputy head in 2014, before being appointed its chairman on 29 December 2016.

Lappo obtained the rank of major general in 2010 and lieutenant general in 2020.

Anatoly Lappo was in charge of Belarusian border during 2021 refugee crisis, and met with the UNHCR representative to discuss the issue. In the same year, he said that that Ukraine was "training military" to "arrive here in Belarus". In 2022, after Russia had already invaded Ukraine, he said that Poland had been acting "provocatively".

He was dismissed on 30 May 2023, and in August, Lappo was appointed Border representative at the CIS Executive Committee.

== Sanctions ==
Anatoly Lappo was sanctioned by the USA, the EU and Switzerland in 2021, and by Japan and Ukraine in 2022.

== Personal life ==
Lappo is married and has two daughters.

In 2011, he won a swimming competition among border guards in his age group.

== Awards ==
- Second-degree order "For Service to the Motherland" (Belarus, 2023)
