= Rostislav Yankovsky =

Soviet-Belarusian actor

- Ростислав Янковский
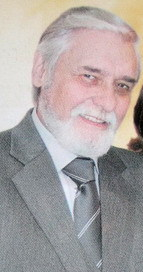
- Yankovsky in 2008
- Born: Расціслаў Іванавіч Янкоўскі; Rostislav Ivanovich Yankovsky; 5 February 1930; Odesa, Ukraine
- Died: 26 June 2016 (aged 86); Minsk, Belarus
- Relatives: Oleg Yankovsky (brother); Igor Yankovsky (son)
- Awards: People's Artist of the USSR (1978)

Rostislav Ivanovich Yankovsky (Belarusian: Расціслаў Іванавіч Янкоўскі; Ukrainian: Ростислав Іванович Янковський; Russian: Ростислав Иванович Янковский; 5 February 1930 – 26 June 2016) was a Belarusian actor. He was born in Odesa on 5 February 1930, studied in Leninabad and debuted in the Tajik theatre in 1951. Since 1957, he worked in the Minsk Drama Theatre. Yankovsky was named a People's Artist of the USSR in 1978. He is the older brother of the more famous Oleg Yankovsky. His son Igor Yankovsky is also an actor. In 1994 he became the Chairman of the Minsk International Film Festival Listapad.

He died in Minsk on 26 June 2016 in Minsk, Belarus, aged 86.

== Filmography ==
Year	Title	Role	Notes
1958	Happiness Must Be Рrotected	Conferee	Uncredited
1958	Red Leaves	Viktor	
1960	Lullaby	officer	Uncredited
1968	Two Comrades Were Serving	Hon. George d'Alroy	
1968	Karantin	Committee-Man	
1970	Waterloo	Flahaut	
1970	I, Francisk Skaryna...	Ivan Skorina	
1972	Sea on Fire	Nikolai Mikhailovich Kulakov	
1973	Land, on Demand	Aguirre	
1984	Meeting at the End of Winter	Semyon Petrovich	
1984	Time and the Conways	Gerald Thornton	
1984	Copper Angel	Leo, the carpenter	
1985	Cancan in an English Рark	Daniil Robak (Torchinsky)	
1985	Battle of Moscow	General Vasily Smirnov	
1986	The Bounce	Demin	
1986	Race of the Century	Stanley Best	
1986	Don't Forget to Turn Off the TV	Mikhail Mikhailovich	
1986	The Dolphin's Cry	minister	
1990	Man from the Black Volga	Antonov	
1990	Eternal Husband	Fedosey Petrovich Zakhlebinin	
1991	Adam's Rib	Viktor Vitalievich	
1991	Ghost	Konstantin Grigoryevich	
1991	Forgive Us, Stepmother Russia	Colonel Steblin	
1992	You Yourself Burn with Mad Рassion for Me	Vladimir Frantsevich	
1992	Sunny Day at the End of Summer	рrofessor	Short
1993	Anomaly	General	
1996	Love in Russian 2	Yarosevich	
1997	A Friend of the Deceased	Igor Lvovich	
2005	The State Counsellor	General Khrapov	

== Honours and awards ==
Belarus

- Order of Francisc Skorina (2000)
- Skorina Medal (1995)
- State Prize of the Republic of Belarus (1998)
- Honorary Citizen of the Hero City of Minsk (2000)
- Award "For Spiritual Revival" (2003)
- Award Theatre Forum "Golden Knight" (For outstanding contribution to the performing arts) (2005)

Soviet Union

- Order of the Badge of Honour (1967)
- Jubilee Medal "In Commemoration of the 100th Anniversary since the Birth of Vladimir Il'ich Lenin" (1970)
- Order of the Red Banner of Labour (1971)
- Order of Friendship of Peoples (1991)
- Honoured Artist of the Byelorussian SSR (1963)
- People's Artist of the Byelorussian SSR (1967)
- People's Artist of the USSR (1978)

Russia

- Pushkin Medal (2007)* International Academy of Theatre
