= Evgeny Bocharov =

Belarusian military officer and politician

- Яўген Бачароў

Chief of the General Directorate of Border Troops
- In office 19 February 1992 – 30 August 1994
- Leader: Stanislav Shushkevich; Alexander Lukashenko
- Preceded by: Office established
- Succeeded by: Vasily Morkovkin

Deputy to the Supreme Council of the Republic of Belarus
- In office 1990–1995

Personal details
- Born: 20 October 1948 Kursk, Russian SFSR, Soviet Union
- Died: 5 July 2004 (aged 55) Minsk, Belarus
- Education: Ryazan Guards Higher Airborne Command School; Frunze Military Academy; Military Academy of the General Staff of the Armed Forces of the Soviet Union

Military service
- Allegiance: Soviet Union; Belarus
- Branch/service: Soviet Airborne Forces; Soviet Border Troops; Belarus Ground Forces; Border Guard Service of Belarus
- Years of service: 1970–1994
- Rank: Lieutenant general
- Battles/wars: Soviet-Afghan War
- Awards: Order of the Red Star; Order of the Red Banner; Order "For Service to the Homeland in the Armed Forces of the USSR"; Medal "For Impeccable Service"; Medal "For Distinction in Guarding the State Border of the USSR"

Evgeny Mikhailovich Bocharov (Russian: Евгений Михайлович Бочаров; 20 October 1948 – 5 July 2004) was a Soviet and Belarusian military officer and politician who served as the Chief of the General Directorate of Border Troops of Belarus from 1992 to 1994. He was a Deputy to the Supreme Council of the Republic of Belarus from 1990 to 1995.

== Early life and education ==
Evgeny Bocharov was born on 20 October 1948 in the city of Kursk of the Russian SFSR to a family of civil servants. Starting in the ninth grade, he participated in a paratroopers club at DOSAAF, and by the age of 22, he had already completed 580 parachute jumps.

Bocharov graduated from the Ryazan Guards Higher Airborne Command School in 1970, the Frunze Military Academy in 1979, and the Military Academy of the General Staff of the Armed Forces of the Soviet Union in 1988.

== Career ==
=== Military ===
Upon graduation, Bocharov served in the 7th Guards Mountain Air Assault Division, reaching the position of battalion commander in 1975 and deputy division commander in 1983.

In 1984, Bocharov was transferred to the 103rd Separate Guards Airborne Brigade, which was fighting in Afghanistan. He reached the rank of its commander in 1988. His unit was stationed in Bagram. After leaving Afghanistan in February 1989, the Brigade was relocated to the Transcaucasian region. It was then moved to Vitebsk in 1990 and transferred under the control of the Soviet Border Troops.

In 1992, he briefly commanded the 5th Guards Tank Army and on 19 February 1992, he was appointed as the Chief of the newly created General Directorate of Border Troops of Belarus. In 1993, he was promoted to the rank of lieutenant general. Under leadership of Bocharov, the Border Guard formed new border groups in Smorgon, Polotsk, and Pinsk. They also began using helicopters to patrol the border, and the force acquired its own spetsnaz group and a military hospital.

In 1994, Lithuania's former first secretary of the Communist Party of Lithuania was kidnapped from Belarus for his responsibility for the January events of 1991. Bocharov managed to preserve his position as the head of the Border Guard because he had been appointed by Prime Minister Vyacheslav Kebich. Upon the election of Alexander Lukashenko as the President of Belarus, he was dismissed on 30 August 1994 for allegedly selling weapons from the arsenal of the Border Troops.

=== Political ===
In 1990, Bocharov was elected to the Supreme Council of Belarus from Vitebsk constituency No. 179. In March 1992, he signed an anti-crisis agreement pledging to defend the sovereignty of Belarus. In the same year, he opposed a referendum on the dissolution of the Supreme Soviet and new elections. In 1993, Bocharov voted against a decree that rescinded the suspension of the Communist Party of Byelorussia. During his time in the parliament he took part in writing laws that govern Belarusian borders and its Border Service. Together with Russian deputies he visited Bosnia at the time of Yugoslav Wars.

Bocharov signed a letter calling for changes to Belarusian state symbols and the introduction of Russian as a state language, endorsing the 1995 referendum. At the same time, he was one of the MPs who petitioned the Constitutional Court of Belarus to examine the suppression of media freedom by Lukashenko.

In 2001, Bocharov defended Belarusian writer Vasil Bykov from attacks by state TV and participated in the 2001 presidential campaign of former Defense Minister Pavel Kozlovsky. He was the head of his electoral headquarters, but Kozlovsky failed to gather the required 100,000 signatures to be nominated. In 2004, Bocharov was one of the members of the organizational committee for the opposition movement "For Change."

== Death ==
Evgeny Bocharov died on 5 July 2004 and is buried at Eastern Cemetery in Minsk.

== Awards ==
- Order of the Red Star (Soviet Union)
- Order of the Red Banner (Soviet Union)
- First class medal "For Impeccable Service" (Soviet Union)
- Second class order "For Service to the Homeland in the Armed Forces of the USSR"(Soviet Union)
- Medal "For Distinction in Guarding the State Border of the USSR" (Soviet Union)
