= Konstantin Molostov =

Belarusian military officer

- Канстанцін Моластаў; Константин Молостов
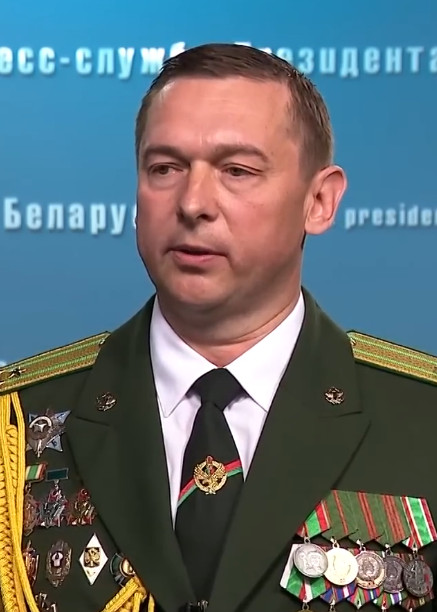
- Molostov in 2023

Chairman of the State Border Committee
- Incumbent
- Assumed office 30 May 2023
- President: Alexander Lukashenko
- Preceded by: Anatoly Lappo

Personal details
- Born: 30 May 1970 (age 56) Krasnoarmeysk, Soviet Union
- Education: Kazakh Border Service Academy; FSB Border Academy; Belarusian MVD Academy; Academy of Public Administration
- Awards: Order "For Service to the Motherland"; Medal "For Distinction in Protecting the State Border"; Jubilee medal "100 years of the Border Service of Belarus"

Military service
- Allegiance: USSR; Belarus
- Branch/service: Soviet Army; Belarusian Ground Forces
- Rank: Major general

Konstantin Gennadyevich Molostov (Belarusian: Канстанцін Генадзевіч Моластаў; May 30, 1970, Krasnoarmeysk, Saratov Oblast, Soviet Union) is a Belarusian military man and politician who is serving as chairman of the State Border Committee of the Republic of Belarus since May 30, 2023. He holds the rank of Major General since 2023.

== Biography ==
He was born May 30, 1970 in the city of Krasnoarmeysk, Saratov Oblast, RSFSR, into a working-class family.

From 1977 to 1987, he studied at Secondary School No. 7 in Grodno. In 1988, he was called up from Grodno for military service in the Soviet Border Troops. He served at a border outpost in the Red Banner Central Asian Border District.

In 1993, he graduated from the Alma-Ata Higher Border Command School of the KGB of the USSR, in 2004 - the Border Academy of the Federal Security Service of Russia, in 2011 - the Academy of the Ministry of Internal Affairs of Belarus, and in 2019 - the Academy of Public Administration under the President of Belarus.

From 2004 to 2009, he was the head of the state border protection service in various formations of the border service of the Republic of Belarus. From 2009 to 2012 - First Deputy Commander of the 2187th Military Unit - Head of the Operational Directorate of the city of Brest. In 2014, he was appointed Head of the Grodno Border Group.

After the start of the migration crisis on the Belarus-Poland border, Molostov was included in the sanctions lists of the European Union, the United States and Canada on December 2, 2021. On December 20, Switzerland joined the EU sanctions, and on December 22, Albania, Iceland, Liechtenstein, Norway, North Macedonia, Serbia, Montenegro.

In 2023, on behalf of President Alexander Lukashenko, Molostov headed the Civil Procedure Code of the Republic of Belarus.
