= Igor Rachkovsky =

Belarusian military officer and politician

- Ігар Рачкоўскі

Chairman of the State Border Committee
- In office 10 April 2007 – 31 July 2012
- President: Alexander Lukashenko
- Preceded by: Alexander Pavlovsky
- Succeeded by: Alexander Boechko

Personal details
- Born: 5 April 1968 (age 58) Smarhon, Grodno region, Byelorussian SSR, Soviet Union

Military service
- Allegiance: Belarus
- Branch/service: State Security Committee of the Republic of Belarus; Border Guard Service of Belarus
- Rank: Major general
- Awards: Order "For Service to the Motherland"

Igor Anatolyevich Rachkovsky (Russian: Игорь Анатольевич Рачковский; born 5 April 1968) is a Belarusian military officer and politician who was the chairman of the State Border Committee of the Republic of Belarus from 2007 to 2012 and later served as the President of the Belarusian Ice Hockey Association from 2014 to 2017.

== Early life and education ==
Igor Rachkovsky was born on 5 April 1968 in Smarhon, Grodno region of the Byelorussian SSR.

In 1990, he graduated from the Riga Higher Military Political School in Latvia. He also graduated from the Belarusian Institute of National Security in 1996 and earned a law degree from the Belarus State Economic University in 2001.

== Career ==
Rachkovsky began his service in the Strategic Rocket Forces before moving to military counterintelligence. He then joined the Border Guard Service of Belarus in 1998. He worked at the Separate Service of Active Measures of the Border Troops and became its head in 2004.

On 10 April 2007, he was appointed Chairman of the State Border Committee. Euroradio linked this appointment to the fact that the President's older son, Viktor Lukashenko, had served under Rachkovsky's command. In that year, he was granted the rank of major general, becoming the youngest general in the history of independent Belarus at the age of 39. In 2008, he became the head of the Belarus Yachting Federation.

In 2007, Rachkovsky stated there should be no border infrastructure along the border with Russia. Between 2009 and 2010, Belarus signed cooperation agreements with Frontex, the European Union border agency. In 2010, the Belarusian parliament ratified a 1997 agreement with Ukraine on the state border. During his speech to parliament on that occasion, Rachkovsky used the Belarusian language, which was rare for Belarusian state officials.

He was dismissed on 31 July 2012 due to the violation of Belarusian airspace by a Swedish aircraft. In November, he was appointed as the First Vice President of the Belarusian Olympic Committee and became President of the Belarusian Ice Hockey Association in 2014. He resigned from his position as president of the Hockey Association in 2017 due to the team's poor performance in the World Championship, and simultaneously lost his position as the head of the Yachting Federation.

== Personal life ==
Igor Rachkovsky is married and has five children. His family has a friendly relationship with that of Viktor Lukashenko. He owns a cottage in Drazdy, an elite suburb where prominent Belarusian people reside.

Rachkovsky also played on the Border Troops hockey team.

== Awards ==
- Third-degree order "For Service to the Motherland" (Belarus, 1999)
- Honorary Diploma of the National Assembly (Belarus, 2008)
