= Francysk Skaryna Medal =

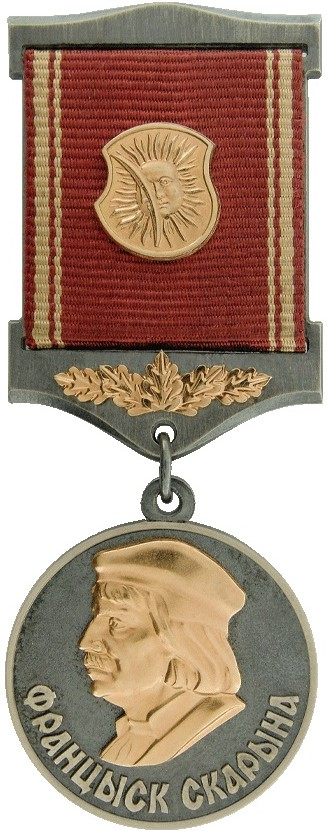
- Type: Medal
- Awarded for: outstanding professional achievements in the fields of science, education, and culture; for great personal contribution to the preservation and enrichment of the Belarusian cultural heritage.
- Country: Republic of Belarus
- Eligibility: Belarusian and Foreign Citizens
- Established: 20 April 1989
- First award: 11 September 1990
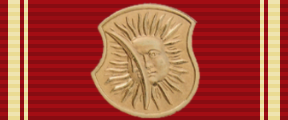

Precedence
- Next (higher): Medal "For Labour Merits"
- Next (lower): Medal "For Perfect Service, 1st Class"

The Francysk Skaryna Medal (Belarusian: Медаль Францыска Скарыны) – is a state award in the Republic of Belarus. The medal differs from the Order of Francysk Skaryna, another state Belarusian award.

== History ==
The medal was established by Decree of the Presidium of the Supreme Soviet of the Byelorussian SSR No. 2675-Xl of 20 April 1989. The medal's position in the order of precedence was modified by Decree of the Supreme Council of Belarus No. 3727-Xll of 13 April 1995. At that point it was placed after the medal "For Labour Merits" instead of following the USSR awards. The medal was re-established by Law of the Republic of Belarus No. 49-3 of 2 July 1997. Nowadays, the medal is regulated by Law "On State Awards of the Republic of Belarus" No. 288-3 of 18 May 2004 similar to all other Belarusian awards.

== Award criteria ==
The Francysk Skaryna Medal is awarded to Belarusian and foreign citizens for outstanding professional achievements in the fields of science, education, and culture; for great personal contribution to the preservation and enrichment of the Belarusian cultural heritage.

== Appearance ==
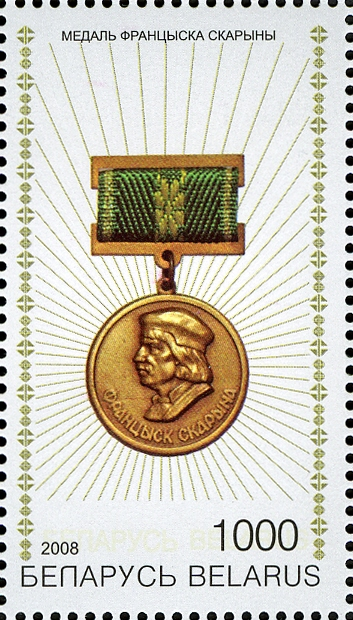
Postage Stamp Featuring the Previous Design of the Medal

The medal appearance remained unchanged since the time of its establishment till 25 May 2017. The first description was recorded in Decree of the Presidium of the Supreme Soviet of the Byelorussian SSR No. 2675-Xl of 20 April 1989. It was documented again in Presidential Decree No.168 of 8 April 2005. The medal was of circular shape, 32 mm in diameter, and was made of tombac. On the obverse it featured a portrait relief of Francysk Skaryna and a raised inscription in Belarusian «Францыск Скарына» on the bottom. The reverse depicted an image of Francysk Skaryna's signet. The medal had a rim. A green silk ribbon, 24 mm in width, enclosed between the top and bottom suspension bars was attached to the medal with a suspension ring. The ribbon was decorated by an 8-mm golden national ornament in the middle and a 2-mm golden thread on both the left and right sides.

== Later modifications ==
The medal was significantly modified by Presidential Decree No. 184 of 25 May 2017. Nowadays, its diameter is 33 mm. The obverse features a golden portrait relief of Francysk Skaryna and an inscription in Belarusian «Францыск Скарына». On the reverse the medal has a smooth surface. A maroon silk ribbon, 30 mm in width, enclosed between the suspension bars is attached to the medal with a suspension ring. The top and bottom suspension bars are 0.5 mm and 1.5 mm respectively; they are placed 1 mm from the ribbon edge. The ribbon center depicts the signet of Francysk Skaryna, and the bottom suspension bar is decorated with oak leaves. The medal is made of tombac with silvering and gilding.

== Recipients ==
The Francysk Skaryna Medal was established as one of the first awards in recent Belarusian history. The initial recipients of the medal were:

- Aliaksandr Mikalaevich Belakoz, teacher of Belarusian language and literature
- Nil Symonavich Hilevich, writer
- Anatoly Mikhaylov, radiologist
- Mikola Ivanavich Yermalovich, historian
- Fedor Kiselev, member of the Belarusian Union of Artists and artist
- Mikhail Aliaksandravich Tkachou, chief editor of the BSSR history publishing department of the Byelorussian Soviet Encyclopedia

== See also ==
- Orders, decorations, and medals of Belarus

== Bibliography ==
- "Francysk Skaryna". Official Website of the Republic of Belarus.
- Исаева И.К. (2007). Награды Республики Беларусь [Awards of the Republic of Belarus]. Мн.: Беларусь.
- "Медаль Франциска Скорины". Государственные награды Республики Беларусь.
- "NASB Representatives Awarded Medals of Francysk Skaryna". National Academy of Sciences of Belarus.
