= Tamara Nizhnikova =

Tamara Nikolayevna Nizhnikova (Belarusian: Тамара Мікалаеўна Ніжнікава, Russian: Тамара Николаевна Нижникова; 9 March 1925 – 15 February 2018) was a Soviet and Belarusian opera singer and teacher. She has been described as "a stalwart of the National Opera and Ballet of Belarus". She was awarded the Order of the Red Banner of Labour, the Order of Friendship of Peoples, and the Order of Francysk Skaryna, and named a People's Artist of the USSR. The Bolshoi Theatre of Belarus performed The Barber of Seville in her honour in 2025.

== Life ==
Nizhnikova was born in Samara on 9 March 1925. She was a soprano opera singer and a singing teacher. Nizhnikova attended the Moscow Conservatory, and sang in a church choir before joining what later became National Opera and Ballet of Belarus. During World War II (the Great Patriotic War), she worked in a medical team assisting the wounded.

Her roles included Rosina in The Barber of Seville, Martha in The Tsar’s Bride, and Violetta in La Traviata. She performed internationally in Sweden, Austria, Mongolia, and Canada.

Prior to her retirement in 1976, Nizhnikova was awarded the Order of the Red Banner of Labour, and named a People's Artist of the USSR. She later received the Order of Friendship of Peoples, and the Order of Francysk Skaryna. In 2015, President Alexander Lukashenko described her as a "wonderful singer with outstanding talent and artistic individuality" and thanked her for "promot[ing] Belarusian singing art in the country and abroad".

Nizhnikova died aged 92 on 15 February 2018. The Bolshoi Theatre of Belarus performed The Barber of Seville in her honour on 11 March 2025, to mark what would have been her one hundredth birthday.
