= Order of Military Glory (Belarus) =

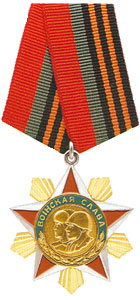
- Type: Medal
- Presented by: Belarus
- Status: Currently awarded
- Established: 13 April 1995
- First award: 22 October 1996

Precedence
- Next (higher): Order of the Fatherland
- Next (lower): Order "For Service to the Motherland"

The Order of Military Glory (Belarusian: Ордэн Воінскай Славы, Russian: Орден Воинской Славы) is a state award, the highest military order of the Republic of Belarus. The only recipient is the former Minister of Defense of Belarus, Leonid Maltsev.

== Criteria and regulation ==
The Order of Military Glory is awarded to military personnel of the Republic of Belarus:

- For exceptional services in commanding troops, maintaining their high combat readiness and professional training;
- For courage and dedication shown in defending the Fatherland and its state interests, and performing other official duties;
- For services in strengthening military cooperation and military cooperation with foreign states.

The Order of Military Glory is worn on the left side of the chest and, in the presence of other orders, is located after the Order of the Fatherland. Has no degrees.

The order can also be awarded to organizations, military units (subdivisions), formations of the Armed Forces of the Republic of Belarus, other troops and military formations, as well as teams of their employees.

== Description ==
The Order of Military Glory is a sign based on a five-pointed star superimposed on a ray-like pentagon. The composition forms a ten-pointed star with a diameter of 44 mm. In the center of the star there is a circle with a diameter of 23 mm, in the circle there is a relief image of two warriors, personifying the ground and air forces. The circle is framed by a wreath of oak and laurel leaves; in the upper part of the circle on a green enamel background is the inscription “Military Glory”. The reverse side of the order has a smooth surface, with the order number in the center.

The order, using an eyelet and a ring, is connected to a pentagonal block covered with a red moire ribbon with a longitudinal green stripe in the middle, three black and two orange stripes on the right side.

The Order of Military Glory is made of silver with gilding.

== See also ==
- Orders, decorations, and medals of Belarus
