= Order of the Fatherland (Belarus) =

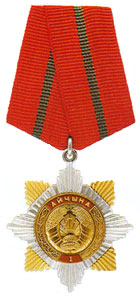
- Type: Medal
- Presented by: Belarus
- Status: Currently awarded
- Established: 13 April 1995
- First award: 22 October 1996

Precedence
- Next (higher): Hero of the Republic of Belarus
- Next (lower): Order of Military Glory

The Order of the Fatherland (Belarusian: Ордэн Айчыны, Russian: Орден Отечества) is the highest order of the Republic of Belarus. Established by Resolution of the Supreme Council of Belarus No. 3726-XII of April 13, 1995. The highest degree of the Order of the Fatherland is I degree.

== History ==
The first awarding of the Order of the Fatherland, III degree, took place on October 22, 1996. For the courage and heroism shown in neutralizing especially dangerous criminals, the order was awarded to the senior inspector of the Orsha Department of Internal Affairs for Transport, police captain Mikhail Ivanovich Demyanov (posthumously).

The next decree on awarding the order was signed on December 10, 1996. For special merits in official activities aimed at strengthening the power of the country, the head of the control and inspection department of the Security Council of Belarus, Colonel Valentin Zakharovich Nikitin, was awarded the Order of the Fatherland, III degree. After 2 days, another decree was signed on awarding the Order of the Fatherland, III degree; The leading specialist of the KGB government communications department, Major S. A. Sakovich, was awarded.

The first awarding of the Order of the Fatherland, II degree, took place on November 2, 2001. For achieving high sports results, the order was awarded to the athlete-instructor of the national artistic gymnastics team of the Republic of Belarus, Ivan Aleksandrovich Ivankov.

== Description and regulation ==
The Order of the Fatherland is the highest order of the Republic of Belarus. It has three degrees:

- Order of the Fatherland, 1st degree;
- Order of the Fatherland, II degree;
- Order of the Fatherland, III degree.

The award is made sequentially with which the Order of the Fatherland III, II and I degrees are awarded:

- For excellent achievements in production, research, socio-cultural, public, charitable and other areas of activity aimed at improving the well-being of people and strengthening the power of the country;
- For the courage and bravery shown in defending the Fatherland and its state interests, ensuring law and order;
- For great services in the development of economic, scientific, technical and cultural ties between the Republic of Belarus and other countries.

The Order of the Fatherland is worn on the left side of the chest and, in the presence of other orders (except for the Order of the Mother), is placed in front of them in order of seniority of degrees.

The Order of the Fatherland is a sign made in the form of two quadrangles, superimposed on each other and forming an eight-pointed star with a diameter of 44 mm.

In the center of the star there is a circle with a diameter of 24 mm, in which there is an image of the State Emblem of the Republic of Belarus, framed by a wreath of oak and laurel leaves. In the upper part of the circle on a red enamel background there is the inscription “Aichyna” (“Fatherland” in Belarusian), in the lower part the degrees of the order are indicated: I, II, III. The reverse side of the order has a smooth surface, with the order number in the center.

The order, using an eyelet and a ring, is connected to a pentagonal block, covered with a red moire ribbon with a longitudinal green stripe in the middle for the order of the 1st degree, two green longitudinal stripes along the edges for the order of the 2nd degree, two green longitudinal stripes along the edges and one green longitudinal stripe in the middle for Order of the 3rd degree.

The Order of the Fatherland, 1st class, is made of silver with gilding, 2nd class, from silver with partial gilding, and 3rd class, from silver.

== See also ==
- Orders, decorations, and medals of Belarus
