= Order of the Friendship of Peoples (Belarus) =

Order of Friendship of Peoples
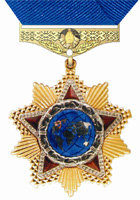
- Order of Friendship (obverse)
- Type: Single grade order
- Awarded for: Strengthening friendship and cooperation between peoples
- Presented by: Belarus
- Eligibility: Belarusian nationals and foreign nationals
- Status: Active
- Established: 2002
- Ribbon of the Order of Friendship

Order of Wear
- Next (higher): Order "For Personal Courage"
- Next (lower): Order of Honor

The Order of Friendship of Peoples (Belarusian: Ордэн Дружбы народаў) is a state award of the Republic of Belarus. It is the highest award of the Republic of Belarus for foreign citizens.

== Statute of the order ==
The Order of Friendship of Peoples is awarded to citizens:

- for a significant contribution to the strengthening of peace, friendly relations and cooperation between states, the consolidation of society and the unity of peoples;
- for especially fruitful activities for the convergence and mutual enrichment of national cultures;
- for high achievements in international public, charitable and humanitarian activities;
- for a great personal contribution to the development and multiplication of the spiritual and intellectual potential of the Republic of Belarus, active work to protect human rights and his social interests;
- for special services in the development of foreign economic activity, democracy and social progress.

The Order of Friendship of Peoples is worn on a neck ribbon.

== Notable recipients (partial list) ==
=== Belarus ===
- Pyotr Klimuk

=== Post-USSR nations ===
- Vladimir Putin, President of Russia
- Boris Gromov, Soviet-Russian general
- Yury Luzhkov, Mayor of Moscow
- Patriarch Alexy II of Moscow
- Valentina Matviyenko, Governor of Saint Petersburg
- Gennady Zyuganov, General Secretary of the Russian Communist Party
- Ramzan Kadyrov, Head of the Chechen Republic
- Alla Pugacheva
- Borys Paton, former head of the National Academy of Sciences of Ukraine
- Ilýa Weljanow, Turkmen diplomat and Soviet general
- Ilham Aliyev, President of Azerbaijan
- Kurmanbek Bakiyev, President of Kyrgyzstan
- Nursultan Nazarbayev, President of Kazakhstan
- Karim Massimov, Prime Minister of Kazakhstan

=== Other nations ===
- Cao Gangchuan, chairman of the Central Military Commission and former Minister of National Defense of the People's Republic of China.
- Hugo Chávez, President of Venezuela
- René Fasel, president of the International Ice Hockey Federation.
- Abdel Fattah el-Sisi, President of Egypt
- Tomislav Nikolić, President of Serbia

== See also ==
- Orders, decorations, and medals of Belarus
