= Team 33 =

- Russian: Команда «33»
- Directed by: Nikolai Gusarov
- Written by: Valentin Chernykh; Albert Likhanov; Valeriy Zelenskiy
- Starring: Yuriy Nazarov; Aleksandr Rakhlenko; Sergey Tezov; Sergei Sozinov; Aleksei Rozhdestvensky
- Cinematography: Georgi Meier
- Release date: 1987
- Running time: 84 minute
- Country: Soviet Union
- Language: Russian

Team 33 (Russian: Команда «33») is a 1987 Soviet drama film directed by Nikolai Gusarov.

== Plot ==
The film tells about the lieutenant colonel, who should accompany the team of conscripts to the Far East.

== Cast ==
- Yuriy Nazarov as Lt. Col. Nikitin
- Aleksandr Rakhlenko as Capt. Tsvetkov
- Sergey Tezov as Komsorg Andrei Dyomin
- Sergei Sozinov as Viktor Kupryanovich Barabanov
- Aleksei Rozhdestvensky as Igor Yampolsky
- Gennadiy Sidorov as Sokolov
- Sergei Pogozhin as Kozin
- Valeri Nemeshayev as Pakholkin
- Vladimir Belousov as Alexandr Sergeyevich Golubok
