= Orders, decorations, and medals of Belarus =

Awards and decorations of Belarus are governed by the Law of the Republic of Belarus on State Awards of 18 May 2004.

The highest award is the title of the Hero of Belarus. The law also specifies orders, medals and honorary titles of Belarus.

== Hero of Belarus ==
| Ribbon | Name (English/Belarusian/Translit) | Creation Date | Description |
| | Hero of Belarus; Герой Беларусі; Hieroj Bełarusi | April 13, 1995 | Belarus's highest award. Awarded for extreme acts of bravery or unwavering commitment and service benefiting the Republic of Belarus. Unlike the previous Hero of the Soviet Union title, this title can only be awarded to a recipient once. |

== Orders ==
| Ribbon | Name (English/Belarusian/Translit) | Creation Date | Description |
| | "Order of the Fatherland"; 1st Class; Ордэн Айчыны; I Ступені; Orden Ajčyny; I Stupieni | April 13, 1995 | Belarus's highest order. |
| | "Order of the Fatherland"; 2nd Class; Ордэн Айчыны; II Ступені; Orden Ajčyny; II Stupieni | April 13, 1995 | |
| | "Order of the Fatherland"; 3rd Class; Ордэн Айчыны; III Ступені; Orden Ajčyny; III Stupieni | April 13, 1995 | |
| | "Order of Military Glory"; Ордэн Воiнскай Славы; Orden Voinskaj Słavy | April 13, 1995 | |
| | "Order of Labor Glory"; Ордэн Працоўнай Славы; Orden Pracoŭnaj Słavy | April 28, 2015 | |
| | Order "For Service to the Motherland"; 1st Class; Ордэн «За Службу Радзiме» I Ступені; Orden «Za Słužbu Radzimie» I Stupieni | April 13, 1995 | |
| | Order "For Service to the Motherland"; 2nd Class; Ордэн «За Службу Радзiме»"; II Ступені; Orden «Za Słužbu Radzimie» II Stupeni | April 13, 1995 | |
| | Order "For Service to the Motherland"; 3rd Class; Ордэн «За Службу Радзiме»"; III Ступені; Orden «Za Słužbu Radzimie» III Stupieni | April 13, 1995 | |
| | Order "For Personal Courage"; Ордэн «За Асабiстую Мужнасць» Orden «Za Asabistuju Mužnaść» | April 13, 1995 | |
| | Order of the Friendship of Peoples; Ордэн Дружбы Народаў; Orden Družby Narodaǔ | May 21, 2002 | |
| | "Order of Honour"; Ордэн Пашаны; Orden Pašany | April 13, 1995 | |
| | "Order of Francysk Skaryna"; Ордэн Францыска Скарыны; Orden Francyska Skaryny | April 13, 1995 | |
| | Order of Mother; Ордэн Мацi; Orden Maci | April 13, 1995 | Awarded to women who give birth to and raise five children. The awarding is made when a fifth child is one year old and in the presence of other living children of this mother. Children also taken into account: Adopted children as defined by legislation; Dead or missing in the defence of the Fatherland and its state interests and the performance of civic duty to save human life, the rule of law and order, or died as a result of injury or disease, or due to employment injury or occupational disease. |
| | Order "For Strengthening Peace and Friendship"; Ордэн «За ўмацаванне міру і дружбы» Orden «Za ŭmacavannie miru i družby» | May 27, 2017 | |

== Medals ==
| Ribbon | Name (English/Belarusian/Translit) | Creation Date | Description |
| | Medal "For Bravery"; Медаль «За Адвагу» Miedal «Za Advahu» | April 13, 1995 | |
| | Medal "For Military Merit"; Медаль «За баявыя заслугі» Miedaĺ «Za bajavyja zasluhi» | January 5, 2022 | |
| | Medal "For a Saved Life"; Медаль «За выратаванае жыццё» Miedaĺ «Za vyratavanaje žyccio» | April 28, 2015 | |
| | Medal "For Distinction In Military Service"; Медаль «За Адзнаку Ў Воiнскай Службе» Miedal «Za Adznaku Ǔ Voinskaj Słužbie» | April 13, 1995 | |
| | Medal "For Distinction In Protecting Public Order"; Медаль «За Адзнаку Ў Ахове Грамадскага Парадку» Miedal «Za Adznaku Ǔ Achovie Hramadskaha Paradku» | April 13, 1995 | |
| | Medal "For Distinction In Protecting The State Border"; Медаль «За Адзнаку Ў Ахове Дзяржаўнай Граніцы» Miedal «Za Adznaku Ǔ Achovie Dziaržaǔnaj Hranicy» | April 13, 1995 | |
| | Medal "For Distinction in the Prevention and Elimination of Emergencies"; Медаль «За адзнаку ў папярэджанні і ліквідацыі надзвычайных сітуацый» Miedaĺ «Za adznaku ŭ papiaredžanni i likvidacyi nadzvyčajnych situacyj» | June 15, 2009 | |
| | Medal "For Labour Merits"; Медаль «За Працоўныя Заслугi» Miedal «Za Pracoǔnyja Zasłuhi» | April 13, 1995 | |
| | "Medal Of Francysk Skaryna"; Медаль «Францыска Скарыны» Miedal «Francyska Skaryny» | April 20, 1989 | |
| | Medal "For Perfect Service"; 1st Class; Медаль «За Бездакорную Службу» I Ступені; Miedal «Za Biezdakornuju Słužbu» I Stupieni | April 13, 1995 | |
| | Medal "For Perfect Service"; 2nd Class; Медаль «За Бездакорную Службу» II Ступені; Miedal «Za Biezdakornuju Słužbu» II Stupieni | April 13, 1995 | |
| | Medal "For Perfect Service"; 3rd Class; Медаль «За Бездакорную Службу» III Ступені; Miedal «Za Biezdakornuju Słužbu» III Stupieni | April 13, 1995 | |

=== Commemorative medals ===
Additionally, the President can introduce jubilee medals (юбiлейныя мядалi) on occasions of important anniversaries observed in Belarus.

| Ribbon | Name (English/Belarusian/Translit) | Creation Date | Description |
| | Jubilee Medal "50 Years of Victory in the Great Patriotic War 1941–1945"; Юбилейная Медаль «Юбілейны медаль «50 год Перамогі ў Вялікай Айчыннай вайне 1941–1945 гг.» Jubilejny miedal «50 hod Pieramohi ŭ Vialikaj Ajčynnaj vajnie 1941–1945 hh.» | March 14, 1995 | |
| | Medal "80 Years of Belarusian Militia"; Медаль «80 Лет Белорусской Милиции» Medal «80 Let Belorusskoj Militsii» | January 31, 1997 | |
| | "Medal of Zhukov"; Медаль «Жукава» Miedal «Žukava» | September 18, 1997 | This medal was created by the Commonwealth of Independent States and was issued in all nations in the commonwealth by their own governments. |
| | Medal "80 Years of the Committee of State Security of the Republic of Belarus"; Медаль «80 Лет Комитету Государственной Безопасности Республики Беларусь» Medal «80 Let Komitetu Gosudarstvennoj» | October 20, 1997 | |
| | Medal "80 Years of the Armed Forces of the Republic of Belarus"; Медаль «80 Лет Вооружённых Сил Республики Беларусь» Medal «80 Let Vooruzhennyh Sil Respubliki Belarus» | February 13, 1998 | |
| | Medal "80 Years of Border Troops of the Republic of Belarus"; Медаль «80 Лет Пограничных Войск Республики Беларусь» Medal «80 Let Pagranichnyh Vojsk Respubliki Belarus» | February 25, 1998 | |
| | Medal "In Memory of the 10th Anniversary of Withdrawal of Soviet Forces from Afghanistan."; Медаль «В память 10-Летия Вывода Советских Войск Из Афганистана» Medal «V 10-Letija Vyvoda Sovetskih Vojsk Iz Afganistana» | February 5, 1999 | |
| | Medal "80 Years of the Procuratorate of the Republic of Belarus"; Медаль «80 Лет Прокуратуре Республики Беларусь» Medal «80 Let Prokurature Respubliki Belarus» | April 9, 2002 | |
| | Medal "150 Years of Firefighting Service of Belarus"; Медаль «150 Лет Пожарной Службе Беларуси» Medal «150 Let Pozharnoj Sluzhbe Belarusi» | August 4, 2003 | |
| | Medal "100 Years of the Train Union Movement of Belarus"; Медаль «100 Лет Профсоюзному Движению Беларуси» Medal «100 Let Profsojuznomu Dvizheniju Belarusi» | April 26, 2004 | |
| | Medal "60 Years Of Liberation Of The Belarusian Republic From German-Fascist Invaders."; Медаль «60 Год Вызвалення Рэспублікі Беларусь Ад Нямецка-Фашысцкіх Захопнікаў» Medal «60 God Vyzvalennja Respubliki Belarus Ad Njametska-Faschystskih Zahopnikaǔ» | May 28, 2004 | |
| | Jubilee Medal "60 Years of Victory in the Great Patriotic War 1941–1945"; Юбилейная Медаль «Юбілейны медаль «60 год Перамогі ў Вялікай Айчыннай вайне 1941–1945 гг.» Jubilejny miedal «60 hod Pieramohi ŭ Vialikaj Ajčynnaj vajnie 1941–1945 hh.» | December 6, 2004 | |
| | Medal "90 Years of Belarusian Militia"; Медаль «90 Лет Белорусской Милиции» Medal «90 Let Belorusskoj Militsii» | December 31, 2006 | |
| | Medal "90 Years of the Committee of State Security of the Republic of Belarus"; Медаль «90 Лет Комитету Государственной Безопасности Республики Беларусь» Medal «90 Let Komitetu Gosudarstvennoj» | October 16, 2007 | |
| | Medal "90 Years of the Armed Forces of the Republic of Belarus"; Медаль «90 Лет Вооружённых Сил Республики Беларусь» Medal «90 Let Vooruzhennyh Sil Respubliki Belarus» | December 28, 2007 | |
| | Medal "90 Years of Border Troops of the Republic of Belarus"; Медаль «90 Лет Пограничных Войск Республики Беларусь» Medal «90 Let Pagranichnyh Vojsk Respubliki Belarus» | May 27, 2008 | |
| | Jubilee Medal "65 Years of Liberation of the Belarusian Republic from German-Fascist Invaders."; Юбилейная Медаль «65 Год Вызвалення Рэспублікі Беларусь Ад Нямецка-Фашысцкіх Захопнікаў» Jubilejnaja Medal «65 God Vyzvalennja Respubliki Belarus Ad Njametska-Faschystskih Zahopnikaǔ» | December 4, 2008 | |
| | Medal "In Memory of the 20th Anniversary of Withdrawal of Soviet Forces from Afghanistan."; Медаль «В память 20-Летия Вывода Советских Войск Из Афганистана» Medal «V 20-Letija Vyvoda Sovetskih Vojsk Iz Afganistana» | January 8, 2009 | |
| | Jubilee Medal "65 Years of Victory in the Great Patriotic War 1941–1945"; Юбилейная Медаль «Юбілейны медаль «65 год Перамогі ў Вялікай Айчыннай вайне 1941–1945 гг.» Jubilejny miedal «65 hod Pieramohi ŭ Vialikaj Ajčynnaj vajnie 1941–1945 hh.» | January 5, 2010 | |
| | Medal "90 Years of the Procuratorate of the Republic of Belarus"; Медаль «90 Лет Прокуратуре Республики Беларусь» Medal «90 Let Prokurature Respubliki Belarus» | May 14, 2012 | |
| | Medal "160 Years of Firefighting Service of Belarus"; Медаль «160 Лет Пожарной Службе Беларуси» Medal «150 Let Pozharnoj Sluzhbe Belarusi» | May 27, 2013 | |
| | Jubilee Medal "70 Years of Victory in the Great Patriotic War 1941–1945"; Юбилейная Медаль «Юбілейны медаль «70 год Перамогі ў Вялікай Айчыннай вайне 1941–1945 гг.» Jubilejny miedal «70 hod Pieramohi ŭ Vialikaj Ajčynnaj vajnie 1941–1945 hh.» | December 21, 2013 | |
| | Jubilee Medal "70 Years of Liberation of the Belarusian Republic from German-Fascist Invaders."; Юбилейная Медаль «70 Год Вызвалення Рэспублікі Беларусь Ад Нямецка-Фашысцкіх Захопнікаў» Jubilejnaja Medal «70 God Vyzvalennja Respubliki Belarus Ad Njametska-Faschystskih Zahopnikaǔ» | January 10, 2014 | |
| | Medal "In Memory of the 25th Anniversary of Withdrawal of Soviet Forces from Afghanistan."; Медаль «В память 25-Летия Вывода Советских Войск Из Афганистана» Medal «V 25-Letija Vyvoda Sovetskih Vojsk Iz Afganistana» | February 4, 2014 | |
| | Medal "110 Years of the Train Union Movement of Belarus"; Медаль «110 Лет Профсоюзному Движению Беларуси» Medal «110 Let Profsojuznomu Dvizheniju Belarusi» | May 28, 2014 | |
| | Medal "20 years of the Security Service of the President of the Republic of Belarus"; Медаль «20 лет Службе безопасности Президента Республики Беларусь» Medal' «20 let Sluzhbe bezopasnosti Prezidenta Respubliki Belarus'» | August 4, 2014 | |
| | Medal "100 Years of Belarusian Militia"; Медаль «100 Лет Белорусской Милиции» Medal «100 Let Belorusskoj Militsii» | May 17, 2016 | |
| | Medal "100 years of the Internal Troops of the Ministry of Internal Affairs of the Republic of Belarus"; Медаль «100 лет Внутренним войскам МВД Республики Беларусь» Medal' «100 let Vnutrennim voyskam MVD Respubliki Belarus'» | October 13, 2016 | |
| | Medal "100 Years of the Committee of State Security of the Republic of Belarus"; Медаль «100 Лет Комитету Государственной Безопасности Республики Беларусь» Medal «100 Let Komitetu Gosudarstvennoj» | April 12, 2017 | |
| | Medal "100 Years of the Armed Forces of the Republic of Belarus"; Медаль «100 Лет Вооружённых Сил Республики Беларусь» Medal «100 Let Vooruzhennyh Sil Respubliki Belarus» | September 28, 2017 | |
| | Medal "100 Years of Border Troops of the Republic of Belarus"; Медаль «100 Лет Пограничных Войск Республики Беларусь» Medal «100 Let Pagranichnyh Vojsk Respubliki Belarus» | October 9, 2017 | |
| | Medal "20 years of emergency response agencies and units of the Republic of Belarus"; Медаль «20 лет органам и подразделениям по чрезвычайным ситуациям Республики Беларусь» Medal' «20 let organam i podrazdeleniyam po chrezvychaynym situatsiyam Respubliki Belarus'» | July 20, 2018 | |
| | Medal "In Memory of the 30th Anniversary of Withdrawal of Soviet Forces from Afghanistan."; Медаль «В память 30-Летия Вывода Советских Войск Из Афганистана» Medal «V 30-Letija Vyvoda Sovetskih Vojsk Iz Afganistana» | October 16, 2018 | |
| | Medal "100 years of the diplomatic service of Belarus"; Медаль «100 лет дипломатической службе Беларуси» Medal' «100 let diplomaticheskoy sluzhbe Belarusi» | October 16, 2018 | |
| | Medal "100 years of state bodies of agriculture and food administration in Belarus"; Медаль «100 лет органам государственного управления сельским хозяйством и продовольствием Беларуси» Medal' «100 let organam gosudarstvennogo upravleniya sel'skim khozyaystvom i prodovol'stviyem Belarusi» | February 12, 2019 | |
| | Jubilee Medal "75 Years of Liberation of the Belarusian Republic from German-Fascist Invaders."; Юбилейная Медаль «75 Год Вызвалення Рэспублікі Беларусь Ад Нямецка-Фашысцкіх Захопнікаў» Jubilejnaja Medal «75 God Vyzvalennja Respubliki Belarus Ad Njametska-Faschystskih Zahopnikaǔ» | April 2, 2019 | |
| | Medal "25 years of the Security Service of the President of the Republic of Belarus"; Медаль «25 лет Службе безопасности Президента Республики Беларусь» Medal' «25 let Sluzhbe bezopasnosti Prezidenta Respubliki Belarus'» | July 1, 2019 | |
| | Medal "100 years of state control bodies of Belarus"; Медаль «100 лет органам государственного контроля Беларуси» Medal' «100 let organam gosudarstvennogo kontrolya Belarusi» | July 2, 2019 | |
| | Jubilee Medal "75 Years of Victory in the Great Patriotic War 1941–1945"; Юбилейная Медаль «Юбілейны медаль «75 год Перамогі ў Вялікай Айчыннай вайне 1941–1945 гг.» Jubilejny miedal «75 hod Pieramohi ŭ Vialikaj Ajčynnaj vajnie 1941–1945 hh.» | February 13, 2020 | |
| | Medal "100 years of Belarusian economic bodies" Медаль «100 лет белорусским экономическим органам» Medal' «100 let belorusskim ekonomicheskim organam» | May 25, 2021 | |
| | Medal "100 years of Belarusian economic bodies" Медаль «100 год органам пракуратуры Беларусі» Miedaĺ «100 hod orhanam prakuratury Bielarusi» | February 22, 2022 | |
| | Medal "30 years of financial investigation bodies of the Republic of Belarus"; Медаль «30 год органам фiнансавых расследаванняў Беларусi» Miedaĺ «30 hod orhanam finansavych rassliedavanniaŭ Bielarusi» | July 6, 2022 | |
| | Medal "In Memory of the 35th Anniversary of Withdrawal of Soviet Forces from Afghanistan."; Медаль «В память 35-Летия Вывода Советских Войск Из Афганистана» Medal «V 35-Letija Vyvoda Sovetskih Vojsk Iz Afganistana» | December 19, 2023 | |
| | Jubilee Medal "80 Years of Liberation of the Belarusian Republic from German-Fascist Invaders."; Юбилейная Медаль «80 Год Вызвалення Рэспублікі Беларусь Ад Нямецка-Фашысцкіх Захопнікаў» Jubilejnaja Medal «80 God Vyzvalennja Respubliki Belarus Ad Njametska-Faschystskih Zahopnikaǔ» | February 29, 2024 | |
| | Medal "70 Years of Belarusian Militia"; Медаль «70 Лет Белорусской Милиции» Medal «70 Let Belorusskoj Militsii» | | |

== Honorary Titles ==
Honorary titles are introduced for various categories of professions and occupations. The honorary titles are accompanied by the corresponding diploma and badges.

| Ribbon | Name (English/Belarusian/Translit) | Creation Date | Description |
| Artistic Titles | | | |
| Athletic Titles | | | |
| Labour Titles | | | |

== Awards and decorations of the Belarusian Democratic Republic ==
In 1949, the Rada of the Belarusian Democratic Republic in exile under President Mikoła Abramčyk has introduced a number of civic and military awards. There has been a number of decorations in the 1950s.

In 2016, the Rada of the BDR has announced plans to renew the decorations. In 2018, the Rada has awarded 130 Belarusian activists and politicians, as well as a number of foreigners, with a newly created medal commemorating the 100th anniversary of the Belarusian Democratic Republic.

| Ribbon | Name | Creation Date | Description |
| | Order of the Pahonia; Ордэр Пагоні | September 1, 1949 | The highest state award of the Belarusian Democratic Republic |
| | Order of the Iron Knight; Ордэр Жалезнага Рыцара | September 1, 1949 | A military decoration for soldiers and officers |
| Brown, red, green | Partisan Medal; Мэдаль Партызана | September 1, 1949 | A medal for the members of the Belarusian anti-Soviet partisan movement |
| | Belarusian Democratic Republic 100th Jubilee Medal; Мэдаль да стагодзьдзя Беларускай Народнай Рэспублікі | December 24, 2018 | A medal "for lifelong achievements in the fulfillment of the ideals of the Belarusian Democratic Republic, including research and the popularisation of Belarus, the strengthening of and achievement of the independence of Belarus, and the struggle for freedom and democracy in Belarus." |
| | Military Virtue Medal; Мэдаль за баявыя заслугі | January 21, 2023 | A medal for bravery on the battlefield |

== Other former military and state awards ==
| Ribbon | Name | Creation Date | Description |
| | Cross of the Brave; Krzyż Waleczności | 1922 | The award was created in 1920 for the soldiers and officers of the army of general Stanisłaŭ Bułak-Bałachovič, a mixed Belarusian-Russian army fighting on the side of Poland during the Polish-Bolshevik war. Bułak-Bałachovič was earlier affiliated with the Belarusian Democratic Republic and at some point declared himself leader of Belarus. |

== Notes ==
1. The Order is always worn in full, the ribbon was drawn to show what it looks like.
2. The ribbons are shown to denote the ribbon colour. These badges are always worn in full.

== See also ==
- Hero of Belarus
- Orders, decorations, and medals of the Soviet Union
- Awards and decorations of the Russian Federation
