= Maria Zakharevich =

Belarusian actress

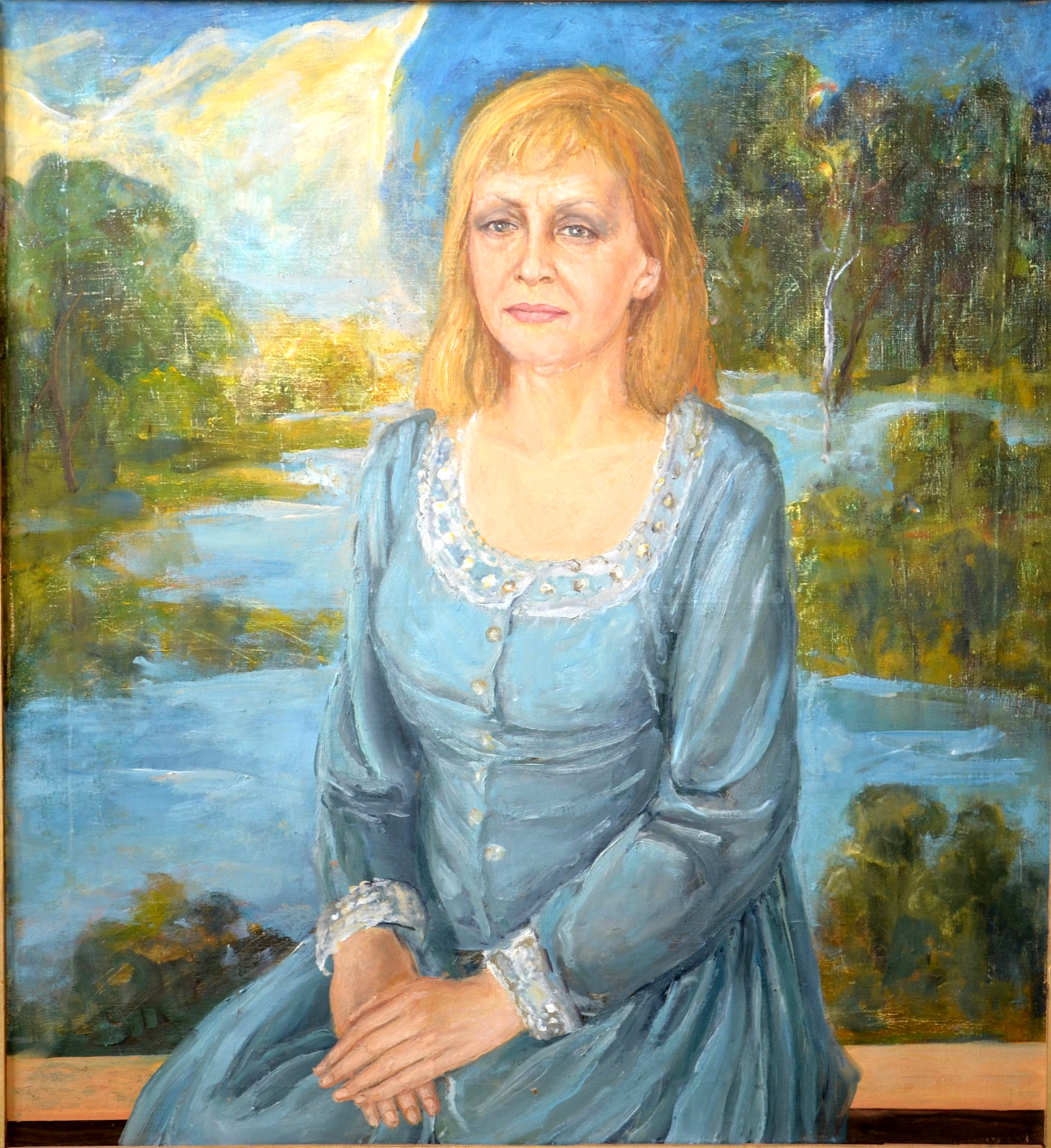
- Portrait of actress Maria Zakharevich by Alexey Kuzmich
- Born: 28 November 1936 (age 89)
- Occupation: Actress

Maria Georgieuna Zakharevich (Belarusian: Марыя Георгіеўна Захарэвіч; born November 28, 1936, in Minsk region, Belarus) is a Belarusian theater actress, director, and People's Artists of Belorussian SSR awarded with Order of Friendship of Peoples (1986), Order of Francysk Skaryna (2020), Veteran of Labour medal (1987), and Francysk Skaryna medal (1996).

== Biography ==
Zakharevich graduated from Belarusian State Academy of Arts in 1957 and was hired by Yanka Kupala National Academic Theater. For nearly 50 years of service, Zakharevich played more than 60 roles. She performed roles in any genre be it drama, comedy, or tragedy.

She was featured in the movies:

- “Somebody else’s fatherland",
- "I, Francysk Skaryna...",
- "People in the swamp",
- "Ruins shoot...", etc.

In 2016, in commemoration of Zakharevich's 80th anniversary, Myadzel Museum of People's Glory dedicated a special photo exhibition to her.

== Awards ==
- Recipient of the State Prize of Byelorussian SSR (1984).
- Certificate of Merit of the Council of Minister of the Republic of Belarus.
- Orders of the Friendship of Peoples (1986) and Francysk Skaryna (2020).
- Medals Veteran of Labour (1987) and Francysk Skaryna (1996).
- People's Artist of Byelorussian SSR (1977).
- Honorary Citizen of the Minsk Oblast (2012).
- Honorary Citizen of Myadel Region (2014).

== Bibliography ==
- Ліпскі У. Нарачанская Чайка: п’еса-ява пра Марыю Захарэвіч, народную артыстку Беларусі / Уладзімір Ліпскі. — Мінск : Беларусь, 2006. — 125 с.: іл. — ISBN 985-01-0663-8.
- Захаревич Мария Георгиевна на сайте Национальной киностудии «Беларусьфільм»
- Захаревич Мария Георгиевна на сайте Белорусские актёры театра и кино
- Захаревич Мария Георгиевна на официальном сайте Минского областного исполнительного комитета
- Захаревич Мария Георгиевна на сайте Мядельского районного исполнительного комитета
- Личное дело. Мария Захаревич: В рот режиссёрам никогда не смотрела
- Творческая встреча с одной из величайших актрис — Марией Георгиевной Захаревич
- Мария Захаревич: ОБЫКНОВЕННОЕ ЧУДО
- У гасцях — Марыя Захарэвіч (бел.)
