= Order of Honor (Belarus) =

Order of Honor Ордэн Пашаны
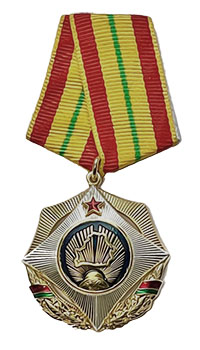
- Medal of the Order of Honor
- Type: State decoration
- Awarded for: Services to the nation
- Country: Belarus
- Presented by: the President of Belarus
- Established: 13 April 1995
- Ribbon of the order

Order of Wear
- Next (higher): Order of the Friendship of Peoples
- Next (lower): Order of Francysk Skaryna

The Order of Honor (Belarusian: Ордэн Пашаны) is an award of Belarus. It is a single level award that was instituted on 13 April 1995. It is awarded for services to Belarus.

== Criteria ==
The Order of Honor is presented in recognition of:

- Achievements in manufacturing, science, public/social/cultural work, or sports
- High level performance in manufacturing, agriculture, construction, communications, trade, housing, utilities services, transportation, and other industries
- Notable achievement in the fields of healthcare, education, or working with youth professionally
- Recognition of high labor productivity, improvement of the quality of products, or reduction of material and labor costs in product manufacturing
- Introduction of new equipment, inventions, and technologies that are deemed especially valuable
- Numerous and broad public and social activities
- Contributions to strengthening economic, scientific, technical, cultural or other ties between Belarus and other countries

== Appearance ==
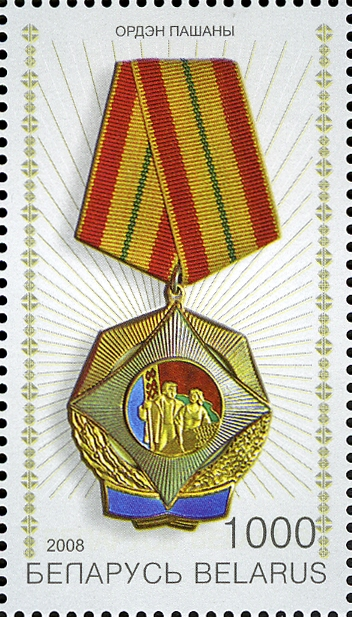
Postal stamp depicting the old design of the order (1995–2021)

The medal of the Order of Honor is eight sided, made of gold-plated silver, and is 50 mm (2.0 in) high and 46 mm (1.8 in) wide. The obverse depicts a four-pointed silver star with a relief gilded outline of the State Border of the Republic of Belarus, superimposed on the gilded rays of the sun rising over the globe. Below the star is framed by two laurel-oak branches, converging at the bottom point, intertwined on the right and left with a red-green ribbon. The reverse is plain, bearing only the award's serial number in the center. The order is attached by a ring suspension to a pentagonal ribbon drape. The ribbon is yellow with red stripes at the edges and a thin green stripe in the center.

== Notable recipients ==
- Pierre Cardin, fashion designer
- Helmut Kutin, president of SOS Children's Villages
- Borys Paton, chairman of the National Academy of Sciences of Ukraine
- Alexander Shilov, Russian artist
- Maxim Ryzhenkov, Belarusian Foreign Minister
- Victoria Azarenka, professional tennis player

== See also ==
- Orders, decorations, and medals of Belarus
