= Igor Yankovsky =

Soviet and Russian actor (1951–2025)

- Игорь Янковский
- Yankovsky in 1983
- Born: Igor Rostislavovich Yankovsky; 29 April 1951; Leninabad, Tajik SSR, USSR
- Died: 26 January 2025 (aged 73); Moscow, Russia
- Occupations: Actor, media manager
- Years active: 1973–2025
- Father: Rostislav Yankovsky
- Relatives: Oleg Yankovsky (uncle)

Igor Rostislavovich Yankovsky (Russian: И́горь Ростисла́вович Янко́вский; 29 April 1951 – 26 January 2025) was a Soviet and Russian actor and television presenter. He was a son of Rostislav Yankovsky, and a nephew of Oleg Yankovsky.

== Life and career ==
Yankovsky graduated from Boris Shchukin Theatre Institute in 1974. From 1974 to 1992 he served in the Malaya Bronnaya Theatre.

From 1992 he was working in the advertising business. He was an academician of the Russian Academy of Advertising.

From 17 September to 26 November 2001 he hosted the game show Alchnost (similar to the American Greed) on the NTV channel.

He held a degree of a Candidate of political sciences.

Yankovsky died from cirrhosis of the liver in Moscow, on 26 January 2025, at the age of 73.

== Selected filmography ==
- 1973 — It is Stronger Than Me as Ivan
- 1974 — Maigret and the Old Lady as Henry
- 1975 — Investigation Led by Experts: Riposte as Yuri Moralyov
- 1976 — Lullaby for Men as Vsevolod
- 1977 — The Golden Mine as Oleg Torchinsky
- 1979 — The Suicide Club, or the Adventures of a Titled Person as Geraldine Jr.
- 1984 — Time and the Conways as Gerald Thornton in his youth
- 1984 — Charlotte's Necklace as Viktor Korablyov
- 1995 — Yeralash: Clock as Igor Nikolayevich, school director
- 2002 — In Motion as publisher
