= Ilya Veldzhanov =

Turkmen politician

Lieutenant General Ilya Veldzhanovich Veldzhanov
- Born: January 17, 1934; Kyzyl-Arvat, Krasnovodsk Oblast, Turkmen SSR, Soviet Union
- Died: 15 October 2017 (aged 83); Minsk, Belarus
- Children: 2
- Military career
- Allegiance: USSR; Turkmenistan
- Branch: Soviet Army; Turkmen Ground Forces
- Service years: 1950–1992
- Rank: Lieutenant General
- Commands: Deputy Commander of the Belarusian Military District

Lieutenant General Ilya Veldzhanovich Veldzhanov (Note: Turkmen: Ilýa Weljanowiç Weljanow;Russian: Илья Вельджанович Вельджанов) was a Soviet-Turkmen politician and diplomat, as well as a Belarusian public figure. He is the first Turkmen general in the Soviet Armed Forces and the first Lieutenant general of the Armed Forces of Turkmenistan.

== Early life and education ==
He was born on January 17, 1934, in Kyzyl-Arvat. He lost his parents early, and was brought up in an orphanage. After graduating from the 7th grade, the director of the orphanage he stayed at sent him to a 3-year medical school, in which the teacher arranged for him to work in the school library, but the 1948 Ashgabat earthquake interrupted his studies, after which he returned to his orphanage without documents.

In 1950, he graduated from college and continued his studies in the labor reserve system, to the Tashkent Industrial Technical School of Labor Reserves, which he graduated in 1954 with a degree in industrial training.

== Military career ==
In 1950, he was drafted into the Soviet Army, where he was asked to enter the Tashkent Higher All-Arms Command School. In 1957, he graduated from with honors. In 1965, entered the Frunze Military Academy, graduating with honors in 1968. In 1975, he graduated from the Military Academy of the General Staff of the Armed Forces and six years later he graduated from the 3-month Higher Academic Courses of Leadership.

He held various positions, from 1971 to 1972, he commanded the SAVO training and motorized rifle regiment, and from 1975 to 1978, commanded the 6th Guards Motor Rifle Division in the Group of Soviet Forces in Germany. He also served in the Volga, Transcaucasian, Central Asian, Turkestan, and Belarusian military districts. From January 1982 to May 1984, he served as Adviser to the Commander of the Kuanino Special Military District of the People's Army of Vietnam. In 1984–1988, he was deputy commander of the Red Banner Belarusian Military District for non-military training activities. In 1987, he was awarded the rank of lieutenant general, and from 1988 to July 1991 he was the chief military adviser of the USSR in North Korea.

In the late 1980s, Saparmurat Niyazov (then the First Secretary of the Turkmen Communist Party) traveled to Azerbaijan for a political event. At that time, Weljanow was the Deputy Commander of the Transcaucasian Military District, and was assigned to accompany him in Baku. Niyazov, surprised at the sight of an ethnic Turkmen general, became acquainted with Weljanow.

He retired from the army in 1992.

== Diplomatic career and activities in Belarus ==
In April 1992, he took up the post of Permanent Plenipotentiary Representative of Turkmenistan in the CIS Working Group. In June 1995, he became the first Ambassador of Turkmenistan to Belarus. At the same time he was the Permanent Plenipotentiary Representative of Turkmenistan to the statutory bodies of the CIS. In September 2007, he was dismissed by the new President of Turkmenistan Gurbanguly Berdimuhamedow, after the death of Saparmurat Niyazov.

After his dismissal, he remained in Belarus. He became the head of the Minsk City Branch of the Belarusian Union of Officers. He was also an honorary professor at the Belarusian National Technical University.

== Personal life ==
He lived and worked in Minsk since 1984. He is married to Lyudmila Konstantinovna Veldzhanova. Their daughter lives in Moscow while their son lives in Minsk as one of the leaders of a large company.

He died on 15 October 2017.

== Awards ==
Weljanow has gained the following national awards:

- Two Orders of the Red Star (USSR)
- Order "For Service to the Motherland in the Armed Forces of the USSR" III degree
- Order of Friendship of Peoples (Belarus, 2006)
- Order "For Merit to Belarus"
- Order "For the Nobility of Thoughts and Deeds" I degree (Ukraine)
- Order of "Bogdan Khmelnitsky" III degree (Ukraine)
- Order of Merit to Ukraine
- Feat Order (Vietnam)
- Order "For Fidelity to Duty" II degree (VAKB)
- Order of Merit for the CIS

He holds more than four dozen medals of the USSR, Russia, Belarus, East Germany, Poland, Vietnam and Turkmenistan. He also holds honorary diplomas from the Central Committee of the Komsomol and the Supreme Soviet of the Kazakh Soviet Socialist Republic.
