= Vladislav Fronin =

Soviet journalist

- Владислав Фронин
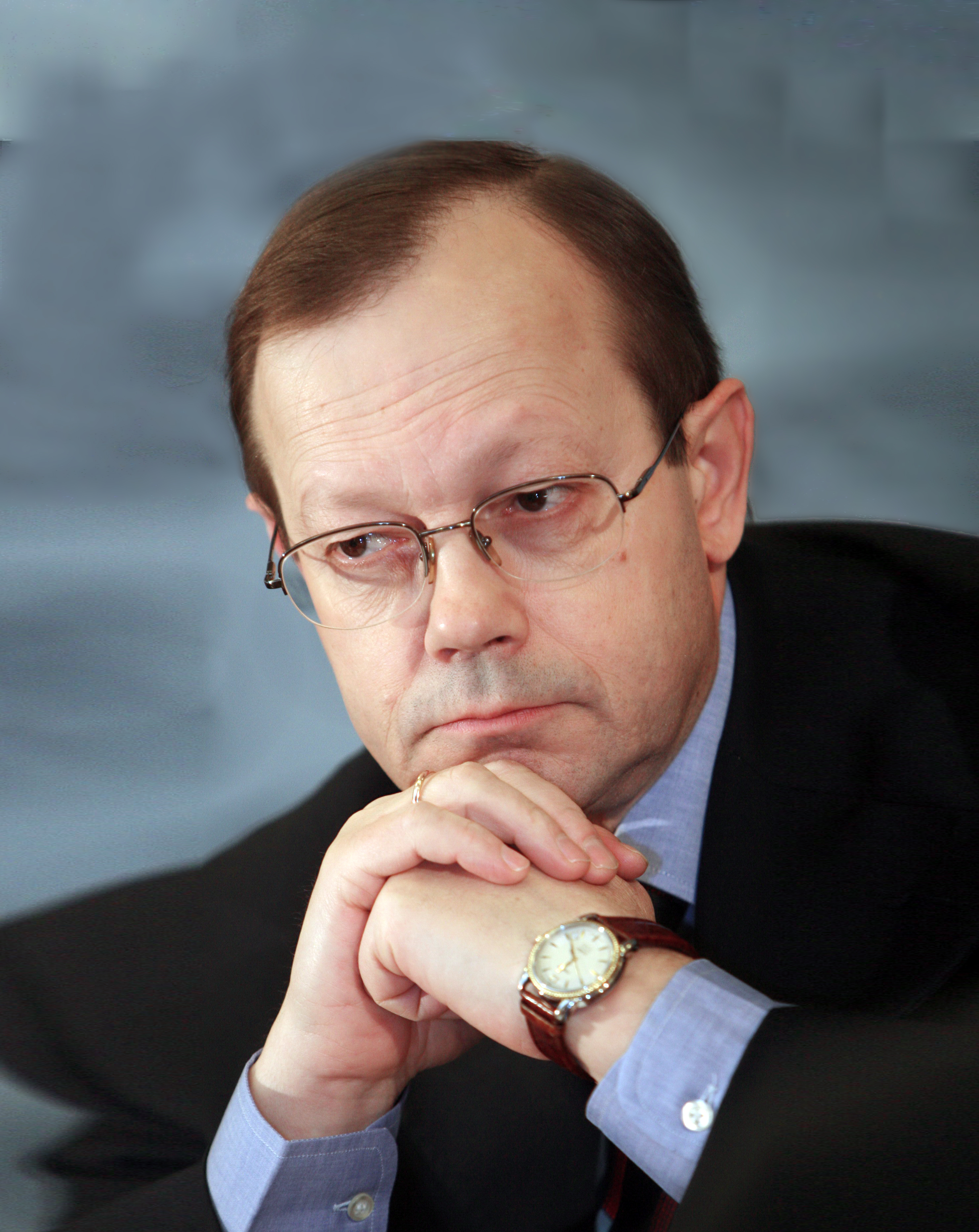
- Born: 21 April 1952 (age 74); Andreyevka, Cherdaklinsky District, Ulyanovsk Oblast, Russian SFSR
- Education: Kazan State University
- Occupations: journalist; publicist; editor-in-chief
- Employer: Rossiyskaya Gazeta

Vladislav Aleksandrovich Fronin (Russian: Владислав Александрович Фронин; born 21 April 1952, Andreyevka village, Cherdaklinsky District, Ulyanovsk Oblast, USSR) is a Soviet and Russian journalist who is serving as editor-in-chief of the pro-government newspaper Rossiyskaya Gazeta since 2001 newspaper and Rodina magazine. He holds the title Honoured Worker of Culture of the Russian Federation (2016).

== Biography ==
He was born on 21 April 1952 in the village of Andreyevka, Cherdaklinsky District, Ulyanovsk Oblast.

In 1974, he graduated from the Faculty of History and Philology of Kazan State University, Department of Journalism, specializing in journalism.

He began his journalistic career in 1974 at the Komsomolskaya Pravda newspaper, rising from an intern and correspondent to executive secretary and deputy editor-in-chief.

In 1986, he was sent to work for the Komsomol. From 1986 to 1988 he served as head of the propaganda department of the Central Committee of the Komsomol, criticized by the Izvestia newspaper for "inept and weak work" with informals.

From 1988 to 1995 he served as editor-in-chief of the Komsomolskaya Pravda newspaper, member of the board of AOZT Komsomolskaya Pravda. In October 1990, he signed the "Rome Appeal".

In 1994-1996 he was a member of the editorial board of the weekly Delovoy Vtornik. In 1995-1996 he served as head of the press center of the Our Home – Russia party.

In 1996-2001 he served as deputy editor-in-chief, first deputy editor-in-chief, and since 2001 he is the editor-in-chief of the Rossiyskaya Gazeta. In 2013-2016 he served as member of the Public Council under the Ministry of Internal Affairs of Russia. Since 2014 he is the editor-in-chief of the magazine Rodina.

He is the creator of a number of new information technologies. He is the author of the idea of organizing the "Direct Line", a direct conversation between a statesman and newspaper readers, which was implemented in October 1985 in Komsomolskaya Pravda, after which it was widely distributed in many Russian media. The first guest was the Deputy Minister of the USSR. He also suggested printing questionnaire coupons in "Komsomolskaya Pravda" for those wishing to go to oil and gas construction sites in Siberia.

During his tenure as editor-in-chief of Rossiyskaya Gazeta, Fronin created a new form of communication with newsmakers — "business breakfasts", the guests of which are government officials, politicians, cultural figures, athletes. Readers and journalists of the publication ask questions to the guests and the answers are published in the newspaper and on the newspaper's website.

In 2012, the Rossiyskaya Gazeta publishing house published the book "Vladislav Fronin. Ashes and Diamond". Among the authors of the collection are Yadviga Yuferova, Vladimir Snegirev, Yevgeny Primakov, Vitaly Ignatenko, Vladimir Sungorkin, Gennadiy Seleznyov, Natalia Solzhenitsyna and others.

On 27 May 2016, Ukrainian President Petro Poroshenko issued a decree enacting the decision of the National Security and Defense Council of 20 May on personal sanctions against representatives of Russian media. Fronin, together with 16 additional people were included in it.

== Awards ==
- Order of Honour (15 October 2010) — for services in the field of printing and many years of fruitful work
- Medal of the Order "For Merit to the Fatherland", 2nd degree (2 August 2006) — for services in the field of culture, printing, television and radio broadcasting and many years of fruitful work
- Order of Francysk Skaryna (24 September 2015, Belarus) — for significant personal contribution to the creation of a single information space and the development of Belarusian-Russian cooperation in the field of journalism
- Order of Honour (19 January 2009, South Ossetia) — for a major contribution to the organization of objective coverage of the events around South Ossetia in August 2008
- Medal "For Distinguished Labour"
- Medal "In Commemoration of the 850th Anniversary of Moscow"
- Honoured Worker of Culture of the Russian Federation (14 May 2016) — for great services in the development of national culture and art, mass media and many years of fruitful activity
- Certificate of Honor of the President of the Russian Federation (12 November 2019) — for merits in strengthening friendly Russian-Belarusian relations
- Letter of Gratitude from the President of the Russian Federation (10 June 2008) — for great contribution to popularization of the Russian language, active participation in the implementation of events of the Year of the Russian Language in Russia and abroad
- Certificate of Honor of the Cabinet of Ministers of Ukraine (10 December 2002) — for significant personal contribution to the development of trade and economic relations of Ukraine and on the occasion of the completion of the Year of Ukraine in the Russian Federation
