= Time and the Conways (film) =

- Directed by: Vladimir Basov
- Written by: Vladimir Basov; John Priestley
- Starring: Rufina Nifontova; Vladimir Basov, Jr. Vladimir Basov; Margarita Volodina; Yevgeny Leonov
- Cinematography: Anatoliy Petritskiy
- Music by: Venyamin Basner
- Production company: Mosfilm
- Release date: 1984
- Running time: 88 minutes
- Country: Soviet Union
- Language: Russian

Time and the Conways (Russian: Время и семья Конвей, romanized: Vremya i semya Konvey) is a 1984 drama film directed by Vladimir Basov and based on the eponymous 1937 play by English playwright J. B. Priestley, filmed in 1984.

== Plot ==
Action takes place in Britain during the 20 years between the two wars. The film explores the relationship in a once wealthy family, whose members, in their own way, are experiencing the collapse of their plans and hopes.

== Cast ==
- Rufina Nifontova as Mrs. Conway
- Vladimir Basov, Jr. as Ernest Beevers in youth
- Vladimir Basov as Ernest Beevers at maturity
- Margarita Volodina as Kay
- Yevgeny Leonov as Alan Conway
- Alyona Bondarchuk as Magee in his youth
- Irina Skobtseva as Magee twenty years later
- Marianna Strizhenova as Joan Halford
- Oleg Tabakov as Robin Conway
- Igor Yankovsky as Gerald Thornton in his youth
- Rostislav Yankovsky as Gerald Thornton twenty years later

Almost all the characters in their youth were played by the children of those actors who played these same characters in their old age.
