= Christoph Reiners =

German nuclear medicine physician and hospital manager

Prof. Christoph Reiners
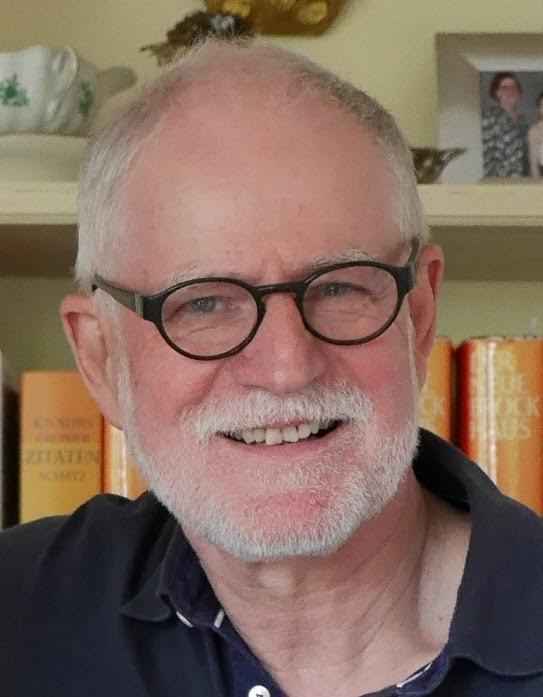
- Born: Mönchengladbach, Germany
- Education: University of Bonn; University of Vienna; University of Kiel; University of Würzburg
- Medical career
- Field: Nuclear Medicine

Christoph Reiners is a German nuclear medicine physician and hospital manager. He is a senior professor of the Medical Faculty of the University of Würzburg.

== Education and career ==
Reiners studied at the University of Bonn and the University of Vienna. After changing to Kiel, he attended as a medical student in 1968 courses in computer science. This excited him so much that he chose the university for his clinical studies, whether there was a computer. He finalized his studies in 1971 at University of Würzburg, one of at that time only five universities in Germany with computers. For his doctoral thesis Reiners studied Nuclear Medicine, where his teacher Wilhelm Börner was looking for a doctoral student with programming and computer skills. Reiners got his approbation as physician in 1973 and his recognition as a specialist for Nuclear Medicine in 1978 along with his additional recognition in "Medical Informatics". In 1974 he defended his medical dissertation at the Medical Faculty of the University of Würzburg on "The use of electronic computers in bone density measurement with an I-125 profile scanner" and in 1983 he acquired habilitation at the University of Würzburg in Nuclear Medicine about "Serum thyroglobulin and thyroglobulin antibodies in thyroid carcinoma and other thyroid disorders".

=== Professional experience ===
From 1983 -1987 Reiners was assistant professor of Nuclear Medicine at the University of Würzburg. 1987 he became Assistant Professor and from 1989 - 1994 Full Professor and Director of the Clinic and Policlinic of Nuclear Medicine, University of Essen. 1994 he returned to Würzburg as Professor and Director of the Clinic and Policlinic of Nuclear Medicine until 2010. Beginning in 2001 he became Managing Medical Director of the University Hospital Würzburg, part-time from 2001 to 2009 and full-time for 2010–2015. During these periods, Reiners contributed substantially to the structural and management reorganization of Würzburg University Hospital and its building activities. Since 2016 he is Senior Professor of the Medical Faculty of the University of Würzburg, being a consultant for the Würzburg-Bad Kissingen Center of Digitalisation in Precision- and Telemedicine (DZ.PTM). Since April 2016, Reiners works voluntarily as scientific speaker of the platform Health and Medicine, Center for Digitalization Bavaria (ZD.B).

=== Research ===
Reiners' scientific focus is on diagnosis and therapy of thyroid diseases (especially of thyroid cancer), in particular thyroid disease caused by the radiation accidents of Chernobyl and Fukushima and medical management of radiation emergencies in general.

He worked for WHO from 1992 - 1994 as member of the WHO International Program on the Health Effects of the Chernobyl Accident (IPHECA), from 2003 to 2004 as member of the WHO-IARC Expert Group on Radiation Induced Thyroid Cancer as well as from 2003 to 2005 as member of the Expert Group „Health" of the WHO-Chernobyl-Forum.

From 1998 to 2002 Reiners participated in a screening project of thyroid status in children exposed to ionizing radiation in utero and at the first year of life after the Chernobyl accident together with Valentina Drozd from Minsk. He organized German scientific and humanitarian activities on treatment of advanced thyroid cancer in children and young adolescents from Belarus after the Chernobyl accident as e.g. the project "Scientists help Chernobyl Children". In this context, he founded in 1994 the German association "Medical Aid for Chernobyl Children e.V." and in 2004 he cofounded together with Valentina Drozd the International Belarusian-German fund "Help for Patients with Radiation-Induced Thyroid Cancer Arnica".

A specific focus of his research is the use of stable iodine to prevent radiation induced thyroid cancer. He worked from 2003 to 2005 as an expert of the Potassium Iodide Working Group of the National Academy of Science, USA and from 2013 to 2017 as chairman of the WHO Guideline Development Group for Iodine Thyroid Blocking and from 2016 to 2018 as member of the WHO-IARC Expert Group on Thyroid Monitoring after Nuclear Accidents. From 2005 to 2017 he was coordinator of the National Collaboration Center within the WHO Network for Radiation Emergency Medical Preparedness and Assistance Network (REMPAN).

From 1996 to 1998 Christoph Reiners was chairman of the Commission for Radiation Protection at the German Ministry for Radiation Protection and Protection of the Environment and from 2011 to 2015 member of the Protection Commission of the Federal Ministry of Interior. He works until today in different bodies of the Commission for Radiation Protection as e.g. in a working group on Thyroid Blocking and on Medical Radiation Emergency Management.

== Membership of scientific societies and boards ==
- Academy of Sciences Leopoldina
- Society of Nuclear Medicine, USA
- European Association of Nuclear Medicine
- German Society of Nuclear Medicine
- Fachverband Strahlenschutz
- German Radiation Protection Committee
- Honorary member of the German and Austrian Societies for Medical Radiation Protection

== Honors and awards ==
- German Federal Cross of Merit on Band, 1996
- Francisca Skorina Medal, Republic of Belarus, 2000
- Member of the German Academy of Science Leopoldina, 2000
- Doctor honoris causa University Minsk, Belarus, 2000
- Light of Life Honorary Award, New York USA, 2009
- Dr. Takashi Nagai Peace Memorial Price, Nagasaki Japan, 2010
- Bavarian Order of Merit, 2015
- Rinecker-Medaille of gold Medical Faculty University of Würzburg, 2016
- Order Bene Merenti of gold University of Würzburg, 2017

== Publications ==
Christoph Reiners authored or co-authored more than 500 articles and 40 books or book chapters.

=== Selected books ===
- Serum Thyroglobulin und Thyroglobulin Antibodies (in German). Thieme Stuttgart 1983, ISBN 3-13-466301-5
- Thyroglobulin and Thyroglobulin Antibodies in the Follow-up of Thyroid Cancer and Endemic Goiter. Thieme Stuttgart 1987, ISBN 3-13-698101-4
- Iodine and the Thyroid: Conference about the Human Thyroid 1997 (in German). de Gruyter Berlin 1998, ISBN 3-11-016327-6
- Nuclear Medicine (in German). Thieme Stuttgart 1999, ISBN 3-13-118503-1
- Ultrasonography of the Thyroid in Children an Adolescents. Schattauer Stuttgart 2000, ISBN 3-7945-2024-6
- Distribution and Administration of Potassium Iodide in the Event of a Nuclear Incident. The National Academies Press Washington DC 2004, ISBN 978-0-309-09098-8
- Recommendations for Quality Control in Nuclear Medicine (in German). Schattauer Stuttgart 2009, ISBN 978-3-7945-2572-0
- Conference Series: Radiation Protection in Research and Practice (in German) Vol. 36–50, Gustav Fischer Stuttgart-Jena-New York 1995–2009. Vol.50 ISBN 978-3-00-027551-7
- Diagnostic, Therapy and Follow-up of Thyroid Cancer (in German). UNI_MED Bremen 2013, ISBN 978-383-7421-125
- Iodine thyroid blocking: guidelines for use in planning for and responding to radiological and nuclear emergencies, WHO Geneva 2017 ISBN 978 92 4 155018 5
- Thyroid Health Monitoring after Nuclear Accidents IARC Technical Publication No. 46, WHO Press 2018 ISBN 978-92-832-2465-5
