= Vasily Morkovkin =

Belarusian military officer

- Васі́ль Маркоўкін

Chief of the General Directorate of Border Troops
- In office 26 September 1994 – 4 September 1996
- President: Alexander Lukashenko
- Preceded by: Evgeny Bocharov
- Succeeded by: Alexander Pavlovsky

Personal details
- Born: 1 September 1938 Amelino, Frolovsky District, Stalingrad Oblast, Russian SFSR, Soviet Union
- Died: 29 October 2010 (aged 72) Minsk, Belarus
- Education: Moscow Border Institute of the KGB of the Soviet Union; Frunze Military Academy

Military service
- Allegiance: Soviet Union; Belarus
- Branch/service: Soviet Border Troops; Border Guard Service of Belarus
- Years of service: 1957–1996
- Rank: Major general
- Awards: Order of the Red Star; Medal "For Impeccable Service"; Medal "For Distinction in Guarding the State Border of the USSR"

Vasily Fyodorovich Morkovkin (Russian: Василий Фёдорович Морковкин; 5 April 1938 – 29 October 2010) was a Soviet and Belarusian military officer who served as the Chief of the General Directorate of Border Troops of Belarus from 1994 to 1996.

== Early life and education ==
Vasily Morkovkin was born on 1 September 1938, in the village of Amelino, in the Stalingrad Oblast of the Russian SFSR.

He was conscripted in 1957 and served in the Soviet Border Troops within the Western Border District. Morkovkin later graduated from the Moscow Border Institute of the KGB in 1962 and the Frunze Military Academy in 1973.

== Career ==
After graduating, Morkovkin served in the Pacific Border District, where he was a commander of a border outpost in Primorsky Krai. He later held positions in both the Transbaikal Border District and the Western Border District.

In May 1992, Morkovkin joined the Belarusian Border Guard, starting in the central office. He was later appointed the first commander of the Smorgon Border Group. On 26 September 1994, he was promoted to head of the Belarusian Border Guard, and on 17 October of the same year, Morkovkin received the rank of major general. His main focus was fighting the illegal smuggling along the border with the Baltic states and Ukraine. In 1995, during his command, the Day of the Border Guard was established. Morkovkin left his position on 4 September 1996, and after retiring, he became an instructor for new border guards.

Vasily Morkovkin died on 29 October 2010. A memorial plaque in his honor was later installed at the headquarters of the Smorgon Border Group. He is buried at Eastern Cemetery in Minsk.

== Awards ==
- Order of the Red Star (Soviet Union)
- First class medal Medal "For Impeccable Service" (Soviet Union)
- Medal "For Distinction in Guarding the State Border of the USSR" (Soviet Union)
