= Golitsyno Border Institute of the FSB of the Russian Federation =

Military school of the Russian Border Guards

- Голицынский пограничный институт ФСБ России
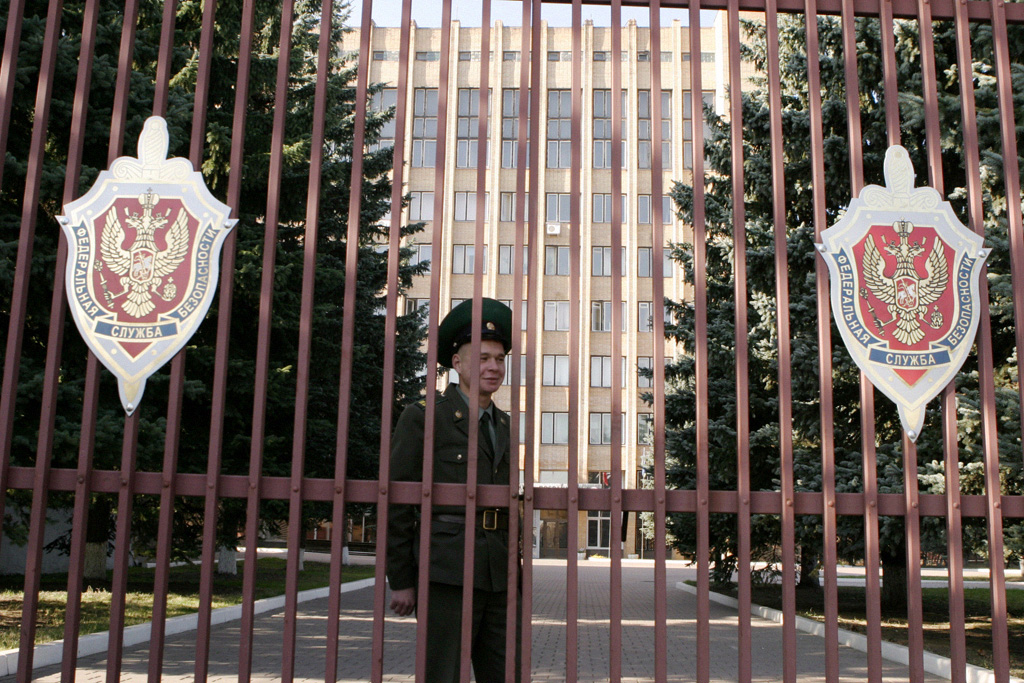
- Former names: KGB Moscow Higher Frontier Guards Command Academy
- Type: military academy
- Established: 14 November 1930
- Parent institution: FSB Border Service
- Officer in charge: Viktor Scheblykin
- Location: Mozhayskoye Shosse, Golytsino, Moscow Oblast, Russia; 55.62882277°N 36.978940688°E

Golitsyno Border Institute of the FSB of the Russian Federation (Russian: Голицынский пограничный институт ФСБ России) is a federal state educational institution of higher professional education for the training of officers for the Border Service of the Federal Security Service of Russia. It traces its history and traditions from the border school of the OGPU of the USSR, which existed between 1930 and 1953). It has existed in its current form since 1967. Located in the town of Golitsyno in Moscow Oblast.

== History ==
=== Background ===
The official history of the Institute dates back to November 14, 1930, when by order of the OGPU No. 386/180, the First School of the Border Guard and the OGPU Troops was founded in Novy Peterhof, Leningrad Oblast. Over the course of its long history, the school has changed names several times.

In the second half of the German Invasion of the Soviet Union, cadets from two battalions of the Novy-Peterhof Military-Political School of the Border and Internal Troops of the NKVD stopped the breakthrough of three German tank divisions to Leningrad near Krasnogvardeysk (now Gatchina). For fifty days, the few surviving cadets and teachers of the school were in continuous battles, defending Leningrad.

Their heroism was marked by a high state award: on February 10, 1943, by decree of the Presidium of the Supreme Soviet of the USSR, the school was awarded the Order of the Red Banner for the exemplary performance of command at combat missions in the fight against the Nazi invaders. Several graduates of the military academy are Heroes of the Soviet Union.

In April 1942, the educational institution was evacuated to Saratov, where in the post-war years the training of political officers for the NKVD troops continued.

On December 25, 1953, on the basis of the order of the Ministry of Internal Affairs of the USSR No. 01173, the school was disbanded.

=== Recreation ===
On October 3, 1967, the Council of Ministers of the USSR adopted a resolution on the establishment of the Higher Border Military-Political School, for which educational buildings and a military camp were built in Golitsyno in Moscow Oblast. On 13 March, 1972, by order of the chairman of the KGB, the educational institution became known as the Higher Border Military-Political Red Banner School of the KGB under the Council of Ministers of the USSR named after Voroshilov, at the same time On 13 March 1972 in accordance with Decree of the Presidium of the Supreme Soviet of the USSR and Order of the Government of the USSR the school was recognized as the successor of the Voroshilov MGB Military-Political School transferring to it the Order of the Red Banner and the name from the latter.

By decree of the Presidium of the Supreme Soviet of the USSR of October 23, 1980, the school was awarded the Order of the October Revolution for success in training personnel.

In accordance with the order of the President of the USSR No. 2781 of October 24, 1991, on the basis of the order of the chairman of the KGB of the USSR, the Higher Border Military-Political Order of the October Revolution Red Banner School of the KGB of the USSR was transformed into the Higher Border Order of the October Revolution Red Banner School of the KGB of the USSR.

On May 5, 1993, in accordance with Decree No. 421 of the Council of Ministers of the Russian Federation, the Higher Border School was transformed into a military institute of the border troops of the Russian Federation and given traditions of the New Peterhof and Golitsyn schools. and in 1996 renamed the Golitsyn Military Institute of the Federal Border Service of the Russian Federation.

== Operations ==
The institute accepts citizens who have not completed military service in the Armed Forces, aged 16 to 22, as well as those who have served or are actively serving in the reserve of the Armed Forces. The main requirements for candidates are the level of education is not lower than secondary, the category of fitness for military service "A" and compliance with the level of physical fitness.

The institute offers a number of specialities, in 15 faculties:

- Jurisprudence, specialization - border activities, qualification (Specialist);
- Psychology, specialization - psychology of performance, qualification (Specialist);
- Jurisprudence, specialization - legal support of national security, qualification (Specialist);
- Legal support of national security (Specialist);
- Jurisprudence (Bachelor);
- Border Management (Bachelor).
- The Institute trains ensigns (Secondary Vocational Education).

== Former commanders ==
- Major General Kursky, Pavel Petrovich 1968-1970
- Major General Chirkin, Pavel Alexandrovich 1970-1982
- Major General Koloskov, Yuri Veniaminovich 1982-1990
- Major General Olefir, Viktor Ostapovich 1990-1997
- Major General Korovenko, Yuri Alekseevich 1997-2003
- Major General Gorodinsky, Vladimir Ivanovich 2003-2010
- Major General Kostrikov, Oleg Igorevich 2010-2015
- Major General Konshin, Vladislav Anatolyevich 2015-2019
- Major General Shcheblykin, Viktor Nikolaevich 26 March 2019—now.
