= State Border Committee of the Republic of Belarus =

Armed border guard of Belarus

State Border Committee of the Republic of Belarus Дзяржаўны пагранічны камітэт Рэспублікі Беларусь
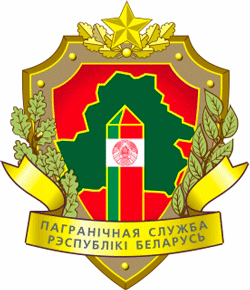
- Emblem of the State Border Guard Service

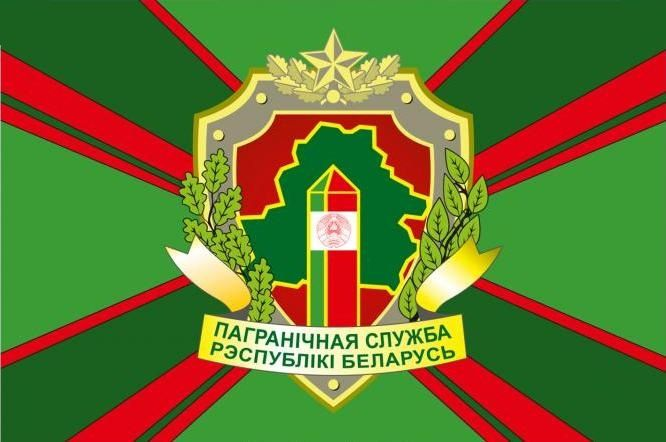
- Flag of the Border Guard Service

Agency overview
- Formed: September 20, 1991
- Preceding agency: Soviet Border Troops
- Employees: 12,000 (2017)
- Annual budget: Br 391,000,000 (2023)

Jurisdictional structure
- Operations jurisdiction: Belarus
- Specialist jurisdiction: National border patrol, security, integrity

Operational structure
- Headquarters: 24 Volodarsky Street, Minsk, Belarus
- Agency executive: Major General Konstantin Molostov, Chairman of the Committee
- Child agencies: Border Guard Service of Belarus; Border Guard Service Institute of Belarus

Website
- gpk.gov.by

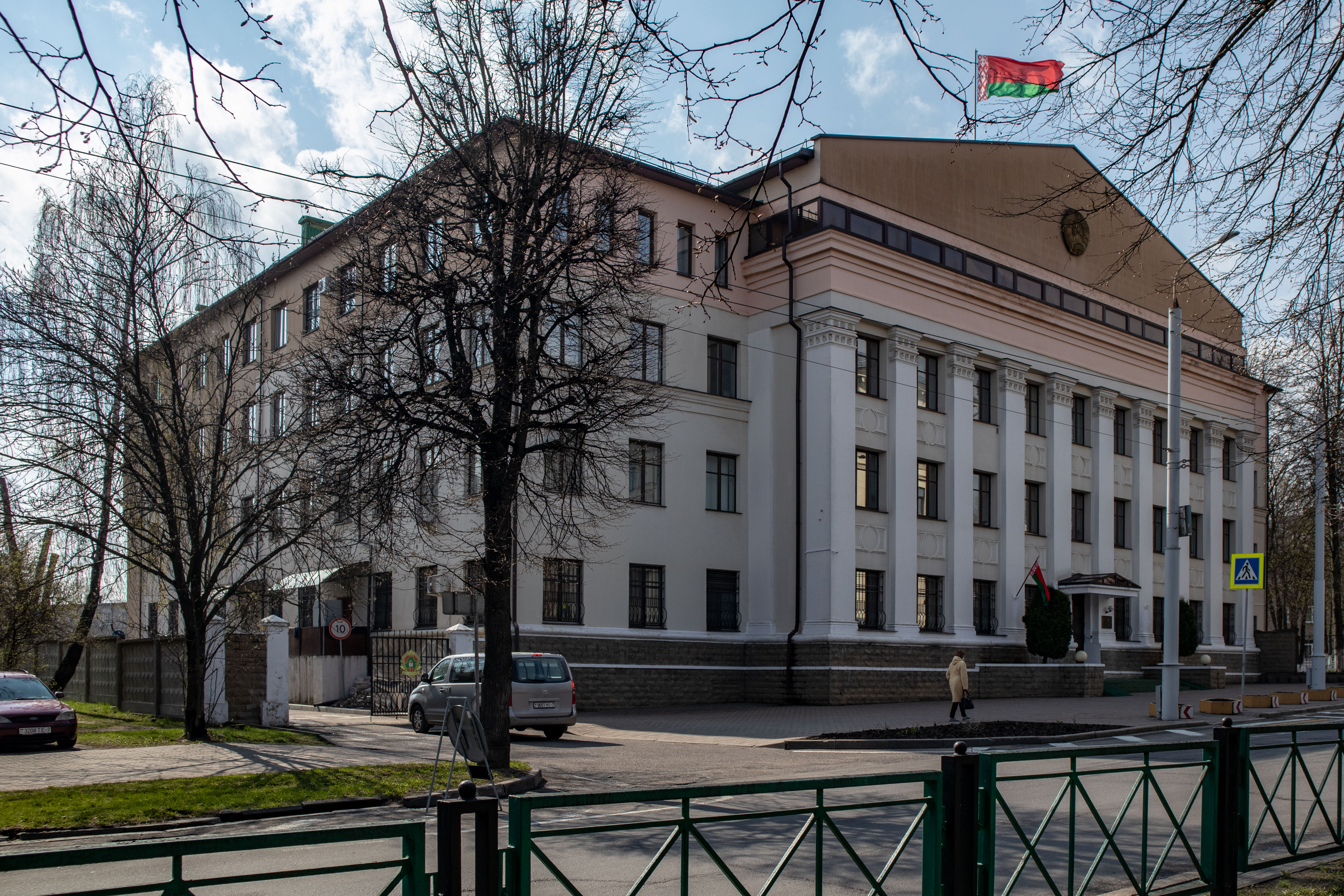
One of the buildings of the committee in Minsk

The State Border Committee of the Republic of Belarus (Russian: Государственный пограничный комитет Республики Беларусь) is a state security agency that manages the international borders of Belarus. Its armed paramilitary force is known as the Border Guard Service, carrying out committee orders and policy. The primary tasks of the State Border Committee include: border policy and enhancing border security.

The service covers the borders with Russia, Ukraine, Poland, Lithuania and Latvia.

== History ==
The State Border Committee of the Republic of Belarus traces its history back to the troops that oversaw the border with the German Empire in 1918 and the formal creation of the Soviet Border Troops in the same year.

In 1939, a border with Germany was established, but the previous Polish-Soviet border was not liquidated. Upon the German invasion of the Soviet Union, approximately 16,000 of the 20,000 border troops became casualties in the first days of the war. The service was essentially recreated from scratch in 1944.

On September 20, 1991, the Supreme Soviet of the Republic of Belarus passed legislation subordinating the border troops to itself, effectively creating a national service. Most of the legislation governing the service was adopted by August 1993. From 1994 to 1997, the first border units were formed and deployed, and agreements were made with neighboring countries to facilitate cooperation between their respective border troops. On January 11, 1997, President Alexander Lukashenko signed a decree renaming the General Directorate to the State Committee of the Border Troops.

On September 18, 2020, the committee announced it had tightened border security with Poland and Lithuania, calling up reserves to patrol the borders although Poland and Lithuania said their borders with Belarus remained open.

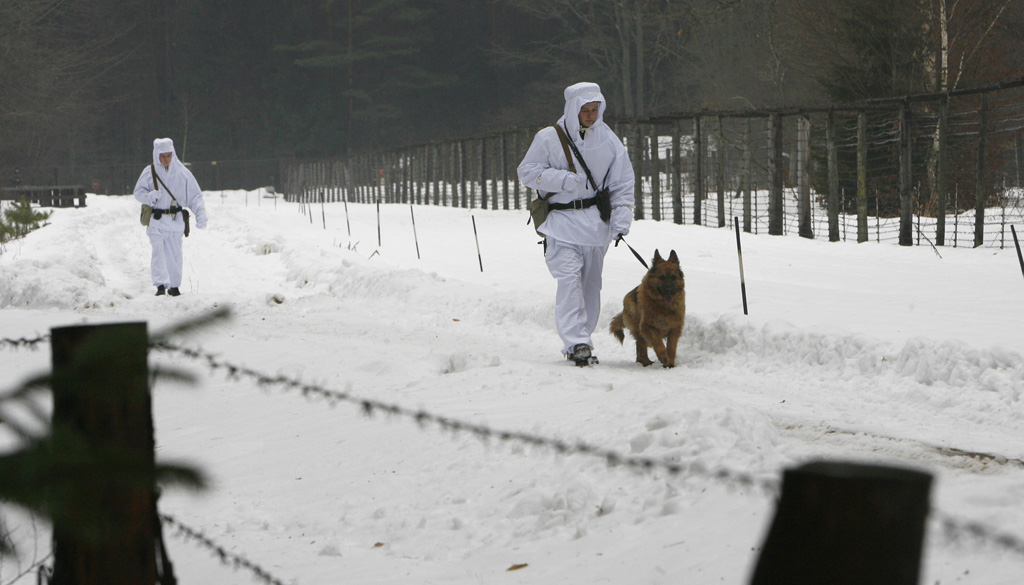
Belarusian Border Guards patrolling the Poland-Belarus border with working dog.

After the start of the Belarus–EU border crisis, the leadership of the State Border Committee, including its chairman Lappo, was included in the sanctions lists of the European Union, the United States and Canada on December 2, 2021. Switzerland joined the EU sanctions on December 20.

== Structure ==
The Border Service of Belarus controls 11 territorial units, the Border Guard Institute, and a Military Hospital:

Unit	Founded	Notes
Brest Border Group	1944	Named after Felix Dzerzhinsky
Lida Border Group	1997	
Smorgon Border Group	1992	
Grodno Border Group	1944	
Gomel Border Group	1997	
Pinsk Border Detachment	1993	
Polotsk Border Detachment	1992	
Mozyr Border Detachment	2014	
Border Control Detachment "Minsk"	1945	It serves Minsk National Airport
Logistics Support Group	1938	
Communications and Support Group	2014	
Border Guard Service Institute	1993	
Border Guard Military Hospital	1994	

== Leadership ==
=== Chairmen ===
Chief of the General Directorate of Border Troops	Leader	Rank	Term of office	
Chief of the General Directorate of Border Troops	Leader	Rank	Took office	Left office
Evgeny Bocharov	Stanislav Shushkevich Alexander Lukashenko	Lieutenant general	February 19, 1992	August 30, 1994
Vasily Morkovkin	Alexander Lukashenko	Major general	September 26, 1994	September 4, 1996
Alexander Pavlovsky	Alexander Lukashenko	Lieutenant general	September 4, 1996	January 13, 1997
Chairman of the State Committee of the Border Troops	Leader	Rank	Term of office	
Chairman of the State Committee of the Border Troops	Leader	Rank	Took office	Left office
Alexander Pavlovsky	Alexander Lukashenko	Lieutenant general	January 13, 1997	April 10, 2007
Igor Rachkovsky	Alexander Lukashenko	Major general	April 10, 2007	September 27, 2007
Chairman of the State Border Committee	Leader	Rank	Term of office	
Chairman of the State Border Committee	Leader	Rank	Took office	Left office
Igor Rachkovsky	Alexander Lukashenko	Major general	September 27, 2007	July 31, 2012
Alexander Boechko	Alexander Lukashenko	Colonel	August 2, 2012	November 2, 2013
Leonid Maltsev	Alexander Lukashenko	Colonel general	November 2, 2013	December 27, 2016
Anatoly Lappo	Alexander Lukashenko	Lieutenant general	December 29, 2016	May 30, 2023
Konstantin Molostov	Alexander Lukashenko	Major general	May 30, 2023	Incumbent
Source: State Border Committee of the Republic of Belarus

=== First Deputy Chairman ===
Name	Rank	Term of office		Notes
Name	Rank	Took office	Left office	Notes
Alexander Popov	Major general	October 31, 1994	July 14, 1996	Died in the line of duty
Evgeny Kovalev	Major general	September 24, 1996	June 9, 2006	
Vadim Zaitsev	Major general	April 10, 2007	July 15, 2008	
Andrey Gorulko	Major general	August 29, 2008	August 2, 2012	
Alexey Zagorodniy	Colonel	August 2, 2012	April 9, 2013	
Igor Butkevich	Major general	April 12, 2013	August 21, 2024	
Andrei Filatov	Colonel	August 21, 2024	Incumbent	

== See also ==
- Visa policy of Belarus
