= Medal "For Labour Merits" =

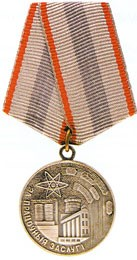
- Type: Medal
- Awarded for: those who "perform great deeds in the name of freedom, independence and prosperity of the Republic of Belarus".
- Presented by: Belarus
- Ribbon: yes
- Status: Currently awarded
- Established: April 13, 1995

Medal "For Labour Merits" (Belarusian: Медаль «За працоўныя заслугі») is a state award of the Republic of Belarus. Established by the Law of the Republic of Belarus dated April 13, 1995 No. 3726-XII "On State Awards of the Republic of Belarus".

== Criteria ==
The medal is awarded in recognition of at least one of the following articles:

- For significant achievements in industry, agriculture, construction, transport, in the service sector, science, education, environmental protection, public health, culture, public service and other areas of work;
- for useful inventions and rationalization proposals;
- for successes in the education and professional training of youth, the development of physical culture and sports.

All citizens of the Republic of Belarus are eligible for the award.

== Description ==
It is a circular, silver-plated tombac medal measuring 33 mm in diameter and with a raised rim on both sides.

On the obverse of the medal, along the outer circumference, the inscription "For Labour Merit" (Belarusian: За працо́ўныя заслу́гі) is embedded; in the center of the circle, there is a relief image of elements symbolizing the labour of people engaged in industry, agriculture, and science. On the reverse of the medal, there are images of a gear and a wheel.

The medal is connected by an eyelet and a ring to a pentagonal block covered with a gray silk moiré ribbon with a dark gray longitudinal stripe in the middle and a red stripe along the edges.

The Medal "For Labour Merit" is worn on the left side of the chest and, if there are other medals, is placed after the Medal "For Distinction in the Prevention and Elimination of Emergencies".

== See also ==
- Orders, decorations, and medals of Belarus
