= Mukovnin =

Mukovnin Муковнин
- Khutor
- Location within Volgograd Oblast Location within Russia
- Coordinates: 49°05′N 43°16′E
- Country: Russia
- Region: Volgograd Oblast
- District: Kletsky District
- Time zone: UTC+4:00

Mukovnin (Russian: Муковнин) is a rural locality (a khutor) in Verkhnebuzinovskoye Rural Settlement, Kletsky District, Volgograd Oblast, Russia. The population was 114 as of 2010.

== Geography ==
Mukovnin is located 50 km southeast of Kletskaya (the district's administrative centre) by road. Verkhnyaya Buzinovka is the nearest rural locality.
