= Order "For Personal Courage" (Belarus) =

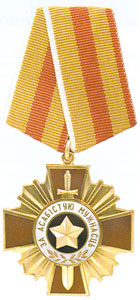
- Order "For Personal Courage" (obverse)
- Type: Single grade order
- Presented by: Belarus
- Eligibility: Belarusian nationals and foreign nationals
- Status: Active
- Established: 2 June 1997
- First award: 8 October 1997

Highlights
- Total: 73
- Ribbon of the Order "For Personal Courage"

Order of Wear
- Next (higher): Order "For Service to the Motherland"
- Next (lower): Order of the Friendship of Peoples

The Order "For Personal Courage" (Belarusian: Ордэн «За асабістую мужнасць»; Russian: Орден «За личное мужество») is a state award of the Republic of Belarus. It is awarded for exceptional courage and personal bravery, feats performed in extreme circumstances. The only Belarusian order in the form of a cross

== Criteria ==
The Order "For Personal Courage" is awarded to citizens:

- For exceptional bravery and personal courage demonstrated in the performance of military duty, civil or official duties;
- For selfless acts committed in extreme circumstances;
- For courage demonstrated in the defense of the state border;
- For courage demonstrated in the protection of public order;
- For bold and decisive actions in circumstances associated with a risk to life.

The Order "For Personal Courage" is worn on the left side of the chest and, if other orders are present, is located after the Order "For Service to the Motherland".

== History ==
The order was introduced into the system of state awards by the decree of the President of Belarus "On Amendments and Additions to the Law of the Republic of Belarus "On State Awards of the Republic of Belarus"" of June 2, 1997. Sometimes the erroneous date of establishment is given as the resolution of the Supreme Council of Belarus No. 3726-XII of April 13, 1995.

Although the order was established by analogy with the Soviet award of the same name, its design is fundamentally different from the Soviet one.

The first recipient of the order was Junior Sergeant Alexander Khomich, a master rescuer of the Borisov fire department, on October 8, 1997, “for courage and decisive actions during the liquidation of the fire at the Borisov railway junction”.

The description of the award was approved by the decrees of the President of Belarus dated September 6, 1999 and April 8, 2005, and its provisions were enshrined in the Law of the Republic of Belarus dated May 18, 2004 No. 288-Z “On State Awards of the Republic of Belarus”.

The most massive awarding of the order took place in 2008, when it was awarded to 15 crew members of the Il-76 aircraft of the TransAviaExport airline, shot down on March 23, 2007 in Somalia.

Awards were also given for sporting achievements. For example, in 2018, the Order of Personal Courage was awarded to the athletes of the Belarusian national biathlon team for winning a gold medal at the 2018 Winter Olympics in Pyeongchang County.

== Description ==
The Order "For Personal Courage" is a gilded cross covered with red enamel against the background of a gilded tetrahedral plane with an image of ribbed rays. In the center of the cross is a circle with a diameter of 22 mm, covered with white enamel, with the inscription "For Personal Courage" and an image of laurel branches. In the center of the circle is a golden five-pointed star on a dark red background. The circle is superimposed on a gilded sword. The reverse side of the order has a smooth surface, in the center is the order number.

The order is connected with an eyelet and a ring to a pentagonal block covered with a golden moire ribbon with a longitudinal maroon stripe in the middle. At the edges of the ribbon there is one longitudinal stripe: on the left side - white, on the right - maroon.

The Order "For Personal Courage" is made of silver with gilding.

== Notable recipients ==
- Dmitry Gvishiani - cadet of the Military Academy of Belarus (posthumously)
- Viktor Karpukhin - Hero of the Soviet Union, internationalist soldier
- Ihar Makarau - Belarusian judoka
- Yaborov, Konstantin Gansovich - military pilot
- Marfitsky, Alexander Eduardovich - military pilot (posthumously)
- Zhuravlevich, Alexander Adislavovich - military pilot (posthumously)
- Sventetsky, Sergei Richardovich - private, gunner of the escort battalion (posthumously)
- Dzinara Smolskaya - Olympic champion, biathlete.
- Iryna Leshchanka - Olympic champion, biathlete.
- Nadezhda Skardino - Olympic champion, biathlete.
- Darya Domracheva - Olympic champion, biathlete.
- Dmitri Pavlichenko - Colonel of the Ministry of Internal Affairs of Belarus.
- Kogodovsky, Roman - a boy who saved his one-and-a-half-year-old younger brother from a burning house, while receiving severe burns.
- Kharlamov, Aleksey Alekseevich - Senior Lieutenant, Deputy Commander for Ideological Work of the Motorized Rifle Company of the 105th Separate Mechanized *Battalion of the 11th Separate Guards Mechanized Brigade of the Western Operational Command of the Armed Forces of the Republic of Belarus.

== See also ==
- Orders, decorations, and medals of Belarus
