= Order of Francysk Skaryna =

Order of Francysk Skaryna Францыска Скарыны
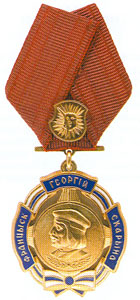
- Medal of the Order of Francysk Skaryna
- Type: Order
- Awarded for: Services to Belarusian art, literature, historical study and the like.
- Country: Belarus
- Established: 13 April 1995
- Ribbon of the Order of Francysk Skaryna

Precedence
- Next (higher): Order of Honor
- Next (lower): Order of Mother

The Order of Francysk Skaryna (Belarusian: О́рдэн Францы́ска Скары́ны) is an award of Belarus. It is named after Francysk Skaryna, one of the first book printers in Cyrillic script. The order was instituted on 13 April 1995; it is awarded for significant contributions in the fields of art, literature, historical study, etc.

== Description ==
The Order of Francysk Skaryna is a four-pointed star with a circle, enclosed in an oval measuring 43 mm vertically and 39 mm horizontally. In the centre of the circle is a relief depiction of Francysk Skaryna, and in the lower part is a laurel branch. The oval is framed by a white and blue enamel ribbon bearing the inscription 'Францыск Георгій Скарына'. The reverse side of the order has a smooth surface, with the order's number in the centre. The order is connected by an eyelet and a ring to a seven-sided block, in the lower part of which is placed the 'signet' sign. The block is covered with a dark purple moiré ribbon. The order is made of silver with gilding.

== Wearing ==
The Order of Francysk Skaryna is worn on the left side of the chest and, when other orders are present, is placed after the Order of Honour.

== Additional information ==
Although the order bears the inscription 'Францыск Георгій Скарына', it has now been proven that the first printer was not named Georgy.

== List of recipients (partial list) ==
- Patriarch Alexy II of Moscow
- Zhores Alferov
- Nadezhda Babkina
- Mohamed ElBaradei
- Yuri Bashmet
- Nikolay Baskov
- Anatoly Bogatyrev
- Pavel Borodin
- Vasil Bykaŭ
- Pierre Cardin
- Count Andrew Ciechanowiecki
- Viktor Drobysh
- Valentin Elizariev
- Vladislav Fronin
- Vladimir Gostyukhin
- Yury Grigorovich
- Mykola Hnatyuk
- Uladzimir Karyzna
- Philipp Kirkorov
- Aleksandra Klimova
- Anatoliy Kotenyov
- Albert Likhanov
- Igor Luchenok
- Yury Luzhkov
- Igor Makarov (businessman)
- Vladimir Mulyavin
- Tamara Nizhnikova
- Aleksandra Pakhmutova
- Borys Paton
- Vladimir Pertsov
- Christoph Reiners
- Vladimir Rusakevich
- Viktor Sadovnichiy
- Alex Salaueu
- Mikhail Savitsky
- Gennadiy Seleznyov
- Jan Syczewski
- Alexander Tikhanovich
- Vyacheslav Trubnikov
- Pavel Yakubovich
- Rostislav Yankovsky
- Boris Yeltsin
- Maria Zakharevich

== See also ==
- Orders, decorations, and medals of Belarus
