= January Events (disambiguation) =

The January Events were a series of violent confrontations between the civilian population and the Soviet Armed Forces in Lithuania in 1991.

The term January Events may also refer to:

- Tashkent anti-Soviet revolt of 1919
- The Barricades, January 1991 events in Latvia
- 2022 Kazakh unrest, crisis in Kazakhstan

== See also ==
- Bloody January (disambiguation)
