= State Prize of the Republic of Belarus =

- Version used since 2014
- Type: Prize
- Presented by: Belarus
- Eligibility: Belarusian citizens
- Status: Currently awarded
- Established: 1992

State Prize of the Republic of Belarus (Belarusian: Дзяржаўная прэмія Рэспублікі Беларусь) is a state award of the highest recognition of the merits of scientists and engineers, literature, art and architecture before society and the state. Starting from 2016, the president of the Republic of Belarus awards it once every four years to citizens of Belarus. The person who is awarded the State Prize is awarded the title "Laureate of the State Prize of the Republic of Belarus", is awarded a diploma, an honorary badge of the laureate, and a cash prize.

The prize was created in 1992 and succeeded The following state prizes are provided for in the Republic of Belarus:

- State Prize in the field of science and technology - "for outstanding works, discoveries and scientific achievements, the results of which have significantly enriched domestic and world science and technology, have had a significant impact on the development of scientific and technological progress and increased economic efficiency, ensuring public health and environmental protection".
- State Prize in Literature, Art and Architecture is awarded "for outstanding works (works of literature, art and architecture, achievements of performing arts) of profound content and distinctive form that significantly enrich national and world culture and contribute to the affirmation of universal human values and ideas of humanism".

The amount of the prize is 3,500 basic units. Both one person and a team of people consisting of no more than six people who directly contributed to the work can apply for the prize. The person who is awarded the State Prize is awarded the title of State Prize laureate and is awarded the Honorary Badge of the State Prize laureate and the State Prize laureate diploma. In cases where the award is given to a group of authors, the title of laureate is assigned to each author, the monetary part of the award is divided between the recipients in equal shares, and an honorary badge and diploma are presented to each laureate.

Proposals for the award of state awards are prepared by the Committee for State Awards of the Republic of Belarus, with subsequent submission of these proposals in the established order for consideration by the president.

Gallery

Version used in 1992–1995

Version used in 1995–2014
