= Golitsyno, Moscow Oblast =

Town in Moscow Oblast, Russia

Golitsyno Голицыно
- Town
- Flag Coat of arms
- Interactive map of Golitsyno
- Location of Golitsyno Golitsyno (Moscow Oblast)
- Coordinates: 55°36′53″N 36°59′14″E
- Country: Russia
- Federal subject: Moscow Oblast
- Administrative district: Odintsovsky District
- TownSelsoviet: Golitsyno
- Founded: 1872
- Town status since: 2004
- Elevation: 180 m (590 ft)

Population (2010 Census)
  - Total: 17,593
  - Estimate (2024): 22,861 (+29.9%)

Administrative status
  - Capital of: Town of Golitsyno

Municipal status
  - Municipal district: Odintsovsky Municipal District
  - Urban settlement: Golitsyno Urban Settlement
  - Capital of: Golitsyno Urban Settlement
- Time zone: UTC+3 (MSK)
- Postal codes: 143040, 143041, 143043, 143044
- OKTMO ID: 46755000006
- Website: golitsyno-city.ru

Golitsyno (Russian: Голи́цыно) is a town in Odintsovsky District of Moscow Oblast, Russia, located 40 kilometers (25 mi) west of Moscow. Population: 17,593 (2010 census); 16,189 (2002 census); 23,315 (1989 Soviet census).

== History ==
It was founded as a settlement in 1872 and was granted town status in 2004. The city is named after House of Golitsyn.

== Administrative and municipal status ==
Within the framework of administrative divisions, it is, together with six rural localities, incorporated within Odintsovsky District as the Town of Golitsyno. As a municipal division, the Town of Golitsyno is incorporated within Odintsovsky Municipal District as Golitsyno Urban Settlement.

== Transportation ==
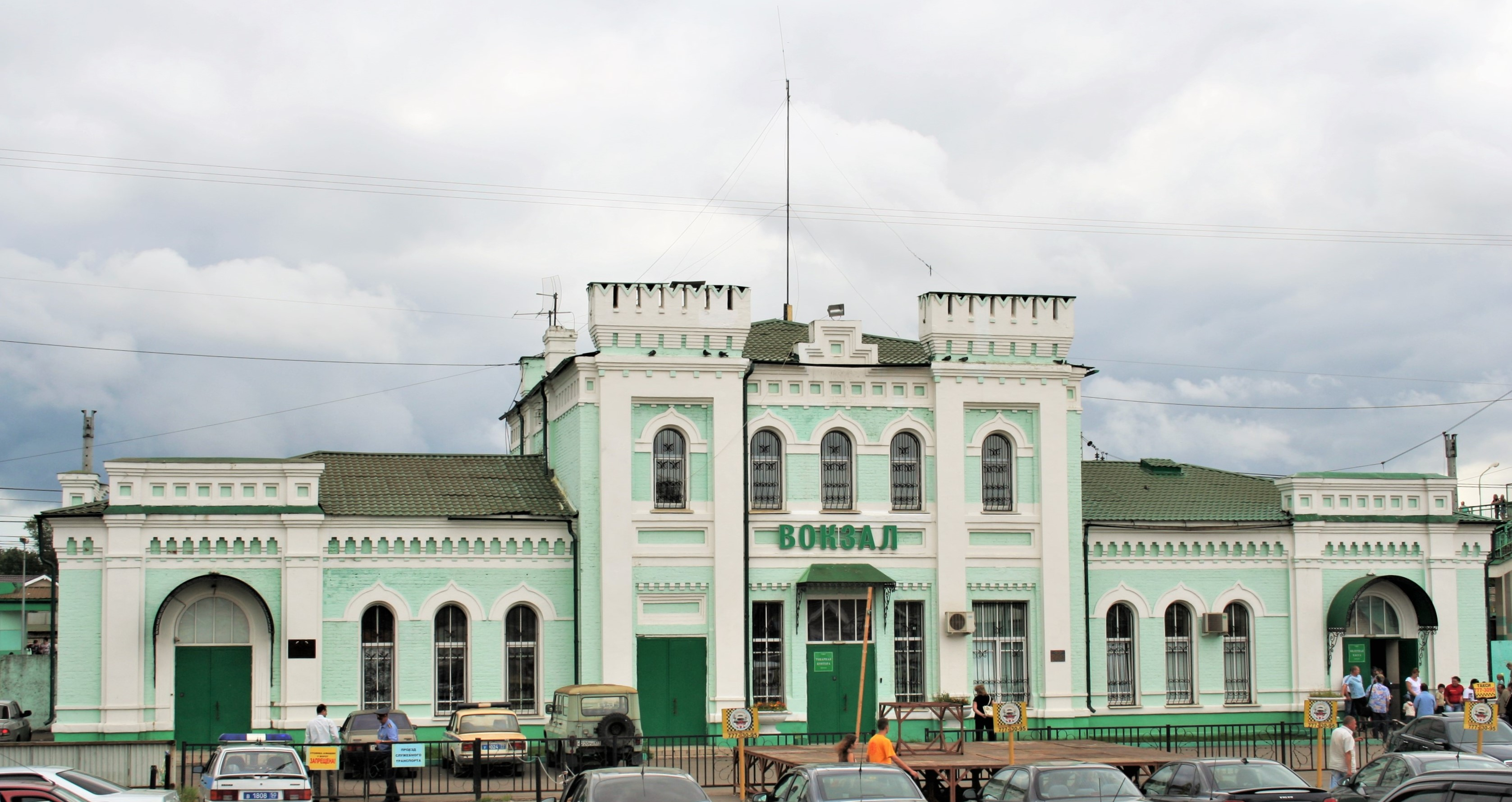
Railway station terminal (built by Lev Kekushev) in Golitsyno

A railway station of the same name on the Moscow–Minsk railway is located in Golitsyno.

== Education ==
There are two schools and Viaziomy Castle.
