= Order "For Service to the Motherland" =

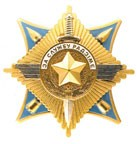
- Type: Order
- Presented by: Belarus
- Status: Currently awarded
- Established: 13 April 1995
- First award: 19 November 1997

Highlights
- Total: 258 (as of 2011)

Precedence
- Next (higher): Order of Military Glory
- Next (lower): Order "For Personal Courage"

Order "For Service to the Motherland" (Russian: Ордэн «За службу Радзіме», Russian: Орден «За службу Родине») is a military award of the Republic of Belarus.

== History ==
The distinction was established by Law of the Supreme Council of Belarus No. 3726 - XII of April 13, 1995, Art. 8 points 3. This act specified that the order was awarded for exemplary performance of military service, achievements in combat training of units, subunits, departments and special services subordinated to a given person, achievements in strengthening public security, protection of the state border and combating crime, protection of the population and territories in emergencies. cases where the awarded person showed particular personal activity.

On September 6, 1999, the Decree of the President of Belarus No. 516 determined its appearance, and on May 18, 2004, the Law of the President of Belarus No. 288-3 repealed the 1995 Act, retaining pursuant to Art. 4 Order "For Service to the Homeland", and in Art. 8 it was established for what merits it was awarded.

The initial award ceremonies occurred on November 19, 1997 (third-degree order), April 15, 1998 (second-degree), and November 10, 2003 (first-degree).

== Regulation and criteria ==
The order has three degrees and can be awarded only once in a given degree, but to receive an order of a higher degree you must have an order of a lower degree. Pursuant to Art. 8 possession of the awarded Soviet Order "For Service to the Homeland in the Armed Forces of the USSR" is equivalent to the appropriate rank of the Belarusian Order and entitles him to be awarded an appropriately higher rank of the Belarusian Order.

Pursuant to Art. 8, the order may be awarded to officers and soldiers of the armed forces, officers of the Ministry of Internal Affairs, officers of the financial services and the State Control Committee, as well as bodies and departments dealing with emergency situations:

- For exemplary performance of military service, achieving high results in combat training of subordinate units and units of the armed forces of the Republic of Belarus and other military formations of the Republic of Belarus, established in accordance with the laws of the Republic of Belarus
- For maintaining high combat readiness and increasing the defense of the Republic of Belarus
- For personal courage and independence in performing official duties
- For special achievements in strengthening national security, protecting the state border and fighting crime
- For other contributions to the country's service.

The distinction is awarded by the President of Belarus.

To date, 297 people have been awarded this distinction, including 258 - 3rd degree, 35 - 2nd degree and 4 - 1st degree.

== Description ==
The Order of Service to the Fatherland of the 1st degree is a convex eight-pointed star. The ends of the star, made in the form of golden rays starting from the center, alternate with smooth ends covered with blue enamel and bordered by a golden border. The gilded upper and lower parts of two crossed rockets are depicted on the plain ends of the star.

In the central part of the order, on a wreath of oak leaves, there is a golden five-pointed star, framed by a belt, at the bottom of which there is a golden laurel branch, at the top, covered with enamel white, there is the inscription «За службу Радзіме» (For service to the Motherland). The edges of the belt are gilded. A star and sash overlap rusty silver wings and a sword.

In the Order of Service to the Motherland of the 2nd degree, the ends of the star, made in the form of rays, are silvered, while the upper and lower parts of the crossed rockets, the edges of the smooth ends of the star . and the asterisk in the center are golden.

The insignia of the Order of Service to the Fatherland of the 1st degree is made of gilded silver, the 2nd degree is made of partially gilded silver, and the 3rd degree is made of ungilded silver.

The insignia of the order measures 65 mm between the opposite smooth ends and 58 mm between the rays. The reverse of the order is plain with the serial number of the decoration engraved in the center. On the back there is a slotted pin with a nut to attach the decoration to clothing.

The medal is connected with an eyelet and a ring to a pentagonal block covered with a blue silk moiré ribbon with yellow longitudinal stripes in the middle: one stripe for the first degree, two stripes for the second degree and three stripes for the third degree.

== See also ==
- Orders, decorations, and medals of Belarus
