= Sardoba Reservoir =

Reservoir in Uzbekistan

Coordinates: 40.3446°N 68.4658°E

Sardoba Reservoir is a water storage facility located in the Sirdaryo region of Uzbekistan. It was built in the area traversed by the central canal of the Southern Mirzachul aqueduct in 2017. It failed catastrophically in 2020.

== Design and construction ==
The construction of the water reservoir began in 2010 and was completed in 2017. Its purpose was to utilize the fertile lands of Sirdaryo and Jizzakh regions and increase the crop yields of rural farmers. The creation of a catchment area around the reservoir was also considered during the construction phase. The construction of the water reservoir involved the participation of more than 10 subcontracting companies, including "Sirdaryo Water Construction Invest" JSC (under the Ministry of Water Economy), "UzGip" LLC (designer), and "O'ztemiryo'lqurilishmontaj" JSC (main contractor for Uzbekistan Railways). The management and development of the Sardoba Reservoir is under the supervision of the "Directorate for the Use and Development of Sardoba Reservoir Objects" under Uzbekistan Railways. The total cost of the Sardoba Reservoir was 1.3 trillion Uzbekistani so'm (equivalent to 404 million US dollars).

On May 1, 2020, the Sardoba Reservoir dam was breached, causing flooding in ten populated areas in the Sardoba, Akaltyn, and Mirzaobod districts of Uzbekistan, as well as the Paxtaorol district of Kazakhstan.

== HPS Project ==
On April 21, 2020, the construction of the Hydroelectric power station (HPS) began at the Sardoba Reservoir by Uzbekhydroenergo JSC. The cost of the HPS construction, which was estimated to be completed in 2023, is 21.3 million euros and will be financed by Russia's Roseximbank. The Russian company "Silovyye mashiny – ZTL, LMZ, Elektrosila, Energomasheksport" is the main contractor, and a contract worth 19.2 million euros was signed with them. According to the project, the HPS will have a total capacity of 10.7 MW, with two hydro turbines generating 5.35 MW each. The annual electricity production capacity of the HPS is expected to be 41.1 million kWh.

== Flood ==
On May 1, 2020 at 05:55, water started overflowing from the 6th picket wall of the Sardoba reservoir, and the water flow gradually increased.

As a result, the Qo'rg'ontepa village was left under water. The residents of the "Birlik", "Qo'rg'ontepa", "Do'stlik", "Yurtdosh", "Navbahor", "Haqiqat", and "Bahoriston" neighborhoods were evacuated. The water also flooded the "Ahillik", "Shodlik", "Saxovat", "Navoiy", "Do'stlik", "Ko'rkamdiyor", "Toshkent", "Yangihayot", "Obod", and "Mustahkam" neighborhoods in Oqoltin district, and their residents were relocated to the city of Gagarin in Jizzakh region. The residents of the "Beruniy", "Paxtaobod", "Baliqchi", "Haqiqat", "Bahoriston", "Yangiovul", and "Do'ngariq" neighborhoods in Mirzaobod district were relocated to the city of Yangiyer. The water flow from the reservoir was directed towards the Abay canal in Oqoltin district and then to the Arnasoy lakes. The residents of Sardoba village were also relocated to the city of Gagarin. According to the information of the Ministry of Emergency Situations of the Republic of Uzbekistan, 11,598 people were evacuated on the first day of the disaster. On May 2, 60,450 people were moved to safe places.

As a result of the disaster, four people died (six by another source) and one person went missing. 2,570 houses and 76 multi-story buildings were completely destroyed, while 1,781 houses and 52 multi-story buildings were partially damaged.

Following the Sardoba disaster, criminal cases were initiated. On May 19, two individuals were detained on suspicion of "negligence with a high position" and "violation of construction regulations".

According to official reports, each of the more than 4,500 homeowners affected by the flood received 40 million Uzbekistani so'm in aid from the state budget. However, not all affected individuals received this aid, and some demanded compensation but were either threatened or detained by internal affairs officials for 15 days.

For the affected residents, 855.4 billion Uzbekistani so'm were allocated for the construction of 86 multi-story buildings with 2,640 apartments.

Overall, 19,592 hectares of land were damaged in Sirdaryo region as a result of the disaster.

== Objection of Kazakhstan authorities ==
On May 1, 2020, after the water release from the reservoir, several settlements in the Turkestan region of Kazakhstan remained underwater. However, the Uzbek Minister of Water Resources called the Minister of Ecology, Geology, and Natural Resources of Kazakhstan and urged them not to discharge water to Uzbekistan, so the evacuation of the population in Kazakhstan was delayed. In addition, Kazakh officials emphasized that the construction of the Sardoba reservoir was not coordinated with Kazakhstan. An official note was sent on this issue. Later, the Ministry of Foreign Affairs of Kazakhstan stated that the note should not have been sent to Uzbekistan.
