= Mehnatobod =

Mehnatobod may refer to:

== Tajikistan ==
- Mehnatobod, Hamadoni District, a jamoat in Khatlon Province
- Mehnatobod, Kushoniyon District, a jamoat in Khatlon Province
- Mehnatobod, Zafarobod District, a jamoat in Sughd Province

== Uzbekistan ==
- Mehnatobod District, in Sirdaryo Region
- Mehnatobod, Namangan region, an urban-type settlement in Mingbuloq District
