= Bayaut (disambiguation) =

Bayaut may refer to:

- Bayaut
- Bayaut, the Russian name for Boyovut, a town in Uzbekistan
- Boyovut District
