= Mehnatobod District =

Coordinates: 40.276924°N 68.816691°E

Mehnatobod
- Former district
- Mehnatobod tumani
- Interactive map of Mehnatobod
- Country: Uzbekistan
- Region: Sirdaryo Region
- Capital: Qahramon
- Established: 1979

Area
  - Total: 420 km^{2} (160 sq mi)

Population (2000)
  - Total: 23,100
- Time zone: UTC+5 (UZT)

Mehnatobod (Uzbek: Mehnatobod tumani / Меҳнатобод тумани) is a former district of Sirdaryo Region in Uzbekistan. In 2004 it was abolished and its territory was divided between the Mirzaobod District and the Xovos District. The capital was the village Qahramon, and its population was 23,100 in 2000.
