= Beshbuloq =

Beshbuloq may refer to the following places in Uzbekistan:

- Beshbuloq, Qashqadaryo Region
- Beshbuloq, Sirdaryo Region
