= 2010 Uzbekistan Second League =

Uzbekistan Second League
- Season: 2010

Uzbekistan Second League is the third highest football league in Uzbekistan.

== Members of Uzbekistan Second League 2010 ==
Team	Location	Stadium	Stadium capacity
Registon-S	Samarkand		
FC Erkurgan	Koson, Qashqadaryo Province		
Sohibkor	Zangiota, Tashkent Province		
D. Manglunberdy	Urganch, Khorezm Province		
Chilonzor-Pakhtakor	Tashkent		
FK Yangiyer	Yangiyer		
Boyovut	Bayaut, Sirdaryo Province		
Neftchi Khamza	Fergana Province		
Buston	Jizzakh Province		

== League format ==
In the second phase participated 9 teams split into two groups: Samarkand and Yangiyer. First two teams promoted to First League.

== Second phase ==
Registon-S, FC Erkurgan, Chilonzor-Pakhtakor and FK Yangyier promoted to the First League

=== Group Samarkand ===
Pos	Team	Pld	W	D	L	GF	GA	GF	Pts	Qualification or relegation
1	Registon-S	3	2	1	0	8	2	+6	7	Promotion to the First League
2	FC Erkurgan	2	1	1	0	4	2	+2	4	.
3	D. Manglunberdy	3	1	0	2	3	5	-2	3	.
4	Sohibkor	2	0	0	2	0	6	-6	0	.

=== Group Yangiyer ===
Pos	Team	Pld	W	D	L	GF	GA	GF	Pts	Qualification or relegation
1	Chilonzor-Pakhtakor	4	4	0	0	7	1	+6	12	Promotion to the First League
2	FK Yangiyer	4	3	0	1	13	4	+9	9	.
3	Boyuvut	4	2	0	2	10	11	-1	6	.
4	Neftchi Khamza	4	1	0	3	7	10	-3	3	.
5	Buston	4	0	0	4	2	18	-16	0	.
