= Baht (disambiguation) =

The baht is the official currency of Thailand.

Baht may also refer to:

- Baht (unit) or tical, a historical unit of mass in Southeast Asia
- Baht, Uzbekistan, or Baxt, a city
- The Baht River in Morocco

== See also ==
- Bhat, an Indian title and surname
- Bhāts, an Indian caste
