= Central Asian Border District =

The Red Banner Central Asian Border District (Russian: Краснознамённый Среднеазиатский пограничный округ) was a district of the Soviet KGB Border Guards. It had its headquarters in Ashgabad. It guarded the Afghan–Soviet border (without the strip along the Wakhan District) and the Iranian–Soviet border. The sea border of the district extended halfway along the southern line of Soviet territorial waters in the Caspian Sea until it met the terrain of the Red Banner Trans-Caucasus Border District.

== History ==
On March 8, 1939, the Central Asian Border Troops District was created. On September 7, 1939, the 26th separate Murgab border commandant's office was formed.

=== Second World War ===
During the war, border guards of the Central Asian District detained several thousand violators, including intelligence agents of enemy states.

In 1942, from the border guards of the Central Asian and Kazakh border districts, the 162nd Central Asian Rifle Division (3rd formation of the 162nd Rifle Division) was formed, which became part of the 70th Army. Also, at the base of the military units of the district, snipers were being trained to be sent to the front.

By order of the NKVD of the USSR dated June 5, 1943, to more effectively manage the border units, the district department was renamed the "Department of Border Troops of the Tajik District" and relocated to the city of Stalinabad (now Dushanbe). At the same time, the Office of Border Troops of the Turkmen District was also created.

=== Post-war period ===
On February 24, 1954, the Tajik Border District, which at that time was part of the USSR Ministry of Internal Affairs, was renamed back to the Central Asian border district.

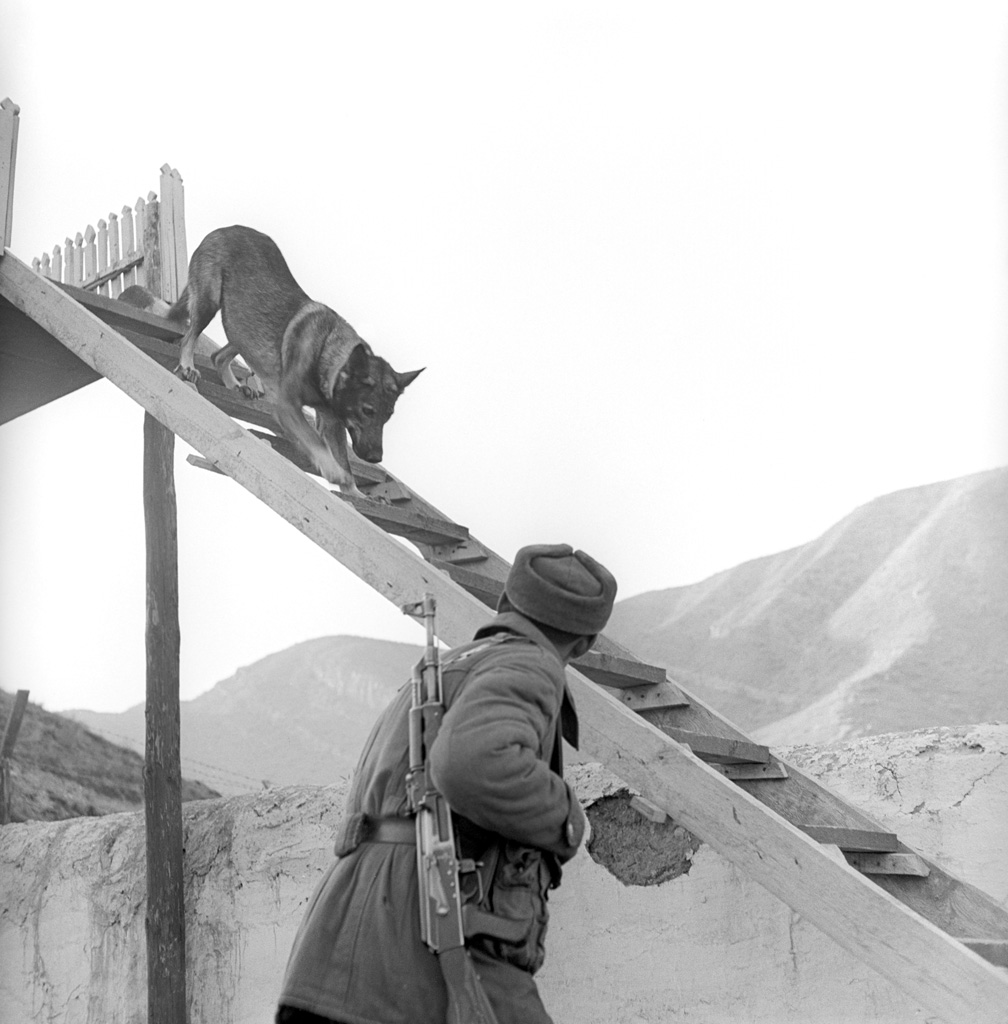
Dog training at a border outpost, November 1, 1966, Tajik SSR. Photo by Lev Polikashin

On March 13, 1963, according to the order of the KGB under the Council of Ministers of the USSR, the Central Asian Border District was formed on the basis of the Central Asian and Turkmen districts with administration in Ashgabat. At the same time, an Operational Military Department was formed in Dushanbe with subordination to the Central Asian District.

In 1978, the Nebit-Dag border detachment was formed.

Since the spring of 1980, after the entry of Soviet troops into Afghanistan, the Central Asian Border District, by decision of the USSR government, participated in blocking the Afghan Mujahideen on the distant approaches to the state border.

Seven border detachments of the Central Asian District and one detachment of the Eastern District operated on the territory of Afghanistan at a distance of up to 100 kilometers from the border. Motor maneuver groups were sent, operating throughout the Afghan War (see Soviet Border Troops). From the deployment points of detachments on the territory of the USSR, Air Assault Maneuver Groups were sent to Afghanistan to conduct combat operations (see Soviet Border Troops).

After the withdrawal of Soviet troops from Afghanistan, to strengthen the border units on the Soviet-Afghan border, mortar divisions were formed in the Takhta-Bazar, Kerkin, Pyanj, Khorog, Termez and Moscow detachments.

To further strengthen border security in Gorno-Badakhshan, on August 18, 1990, at the base of the Operational Military Group of Eastern Border District in the settlement Ishkashim, the Tajik SSR created the Ishkashim border detachment with a personnel of 1390 people, which was transferred to the Central Asian Border District.

=== After the collapse of the USSR ===
On November 8, 1992, by Decree of the President of the Russian Federation, the Central Asian Border District was officially disbanded, although it actually ceased to exist long before this date. After the collapse of the USSR, in some former Soviet republics, common border troops were maintained for several months, with a unified command in Moscow.

Border troops and parts of the district on the territory of Uzbekistan came under its jurisdiction in March 1992. Border detachments on the territory of Turkmenistan, according to an interstate agreement, remained under the jurisdiction of Russia until December 20, 2000. The border detachments of the former Central Asian border district located on the territory of Republic of Tajikistan, due to the Tajik Civil War, were under the jurisdiction of Russia for a long period. During the division of the Eastern Border District in August 1992 between Kazakhstan and Russia, the Murghab border detachment also became one of these detachments. In November 2004, all border detachments of the former Central Asian district on the territory of Tajikistan were transferred to the Armed Forces of the Republic of Tajikistan.

The new Uzbek River Force was raised from the Termez Brigade of Frontier Escort Ships, formerly subordinated to the Central Asian Border District, which had protected the Soviet-Afghan border at the Amu Darya.

== Composition of the district ==
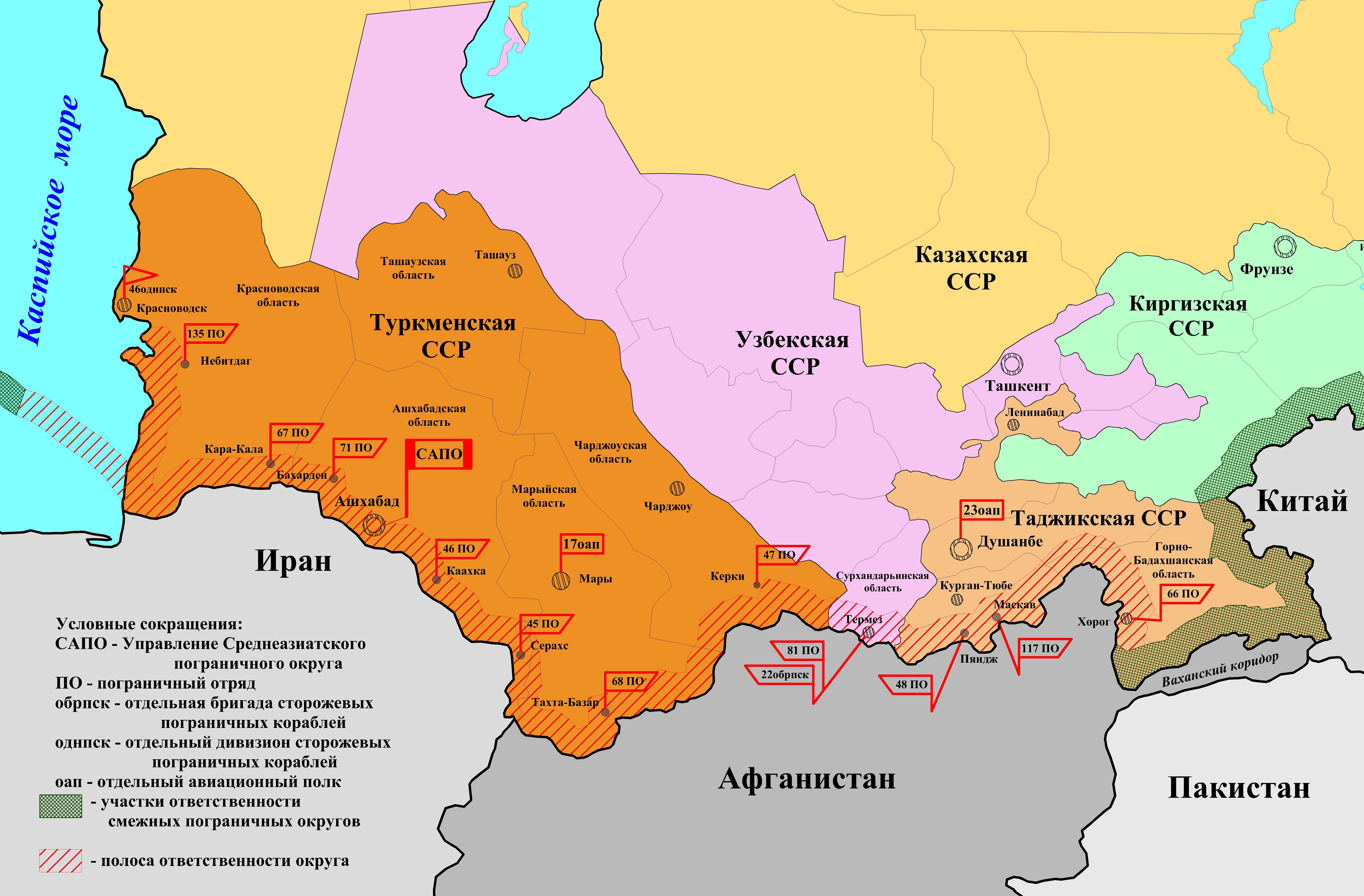
Central Asian border district as of May 1990. Disposition of detachments

Composition of the Central Asian Border District before the collapse of the USSR, units are listed in order from east to west:

- Management district – Ashgabat
  - District Commandant's Office (military unit 2454) – Ashgabat
- 118th Ishkashimskiy Border Detachment (118-й ПОГО) — Ishkoshim, Tajik SSR. Military Unit Number 9878. Created on August 18, 1990, and reassigned from the Eastern Border District.
- 66th Khoroghskiy Border Detachment (66-й ПОГО) — Khorogh, Tajik SSR. Military Unit Number 2022.
- 117th Moskovskiy Border Detachment (117-й ПОГО) – Moskovskiy, Tajik SSR. Military Unit No. 2033.
- 48th Pyandzhskiy Border Detachment (48-й ПОГО) — Panj, Tajik SSR. Military Unit 2066.
- 81st Termezskiy Border Detachment (81-й ПОГО) — Termez, Uzbek SSR. Military Unit 2099.
- 47th Kerkinskiy Border Detachment (47-й ПОГО) — Kerki, Turkmen SSR. Military Unit 2042.
- 68th Tahta-Bazarskiy Border Detachment (68-й ПОГО) — Tahta-Bazar, Turkmen SSR. Military Unit 2072.
- 45th Serakhskiy Border Detachment (45-й ПОГО) — Serakhs, Turkmen SSR. Military Unit 2063.
- 46th Kaakhanskiy Border Detachment (46-й ПОГО) — Kaakha, Turkmen SSR. Military Unit 2088.
- 71st Baherdenskiy Border Detachment (71-й ПОГО) — Baherden, Turkmen SSR. Military Unit 2103.
- 67th Kara-Kalinskiy Border Detachment (76-й ПОГО) — Kara-Kala, Turkmen SSR. Military Unit 2047.
- 135th Nebit-Dagskiy Border Detachment (135-й ПОГО) — Nebit-Dag, Turkmen SSR. Military Unit 9847.
- 17th Training Border Detachment (17-й УПОГО) — Dushanbe, Tajik SSR. Military unit 2421.
- Separate Border-crossing Checkpoint «Mary» (ОКПП «Мары»)
- Separate Border-crossing Checkpoint «Termez» (ОКПП «Термез»)
- Separate Border-crossing Checkpoint «Irkutsk» (ОКПП «Ташкент»)
- 22nd separate brigade of border patrol ships (military unit 9873) – Termez, Uzbek SSR
- 46th separate division of border patrol boats (military unit 9884) – Krasnovodsk
- 23rd separate aviation regiment (military unit 9809) – Dushanbe
- 17th separate aviation regiment (military unit 2178) – Mary, Turkmen SSR
- 114th separate communications battalion of border troops (military unit 2076) – Ashgabat
- 118th separate communications battalion (military unit 2014) – Dushanbe
- 8th inter-district school for sergeants (military unit 2420) – Mary, Turkmen SSR
- 9th separate engineering and construction battalion (military unit 9869) – Ashgabat
- Separate engineering and construction battalion (military unit 9870) – Dushanbe
- District military hospital (military unit 2523) – Ashgabat
- District military hospital (military unit 2528) – Dushanbe
- Separate automobile battalion (military unit 3334) – Dushanbe
- 15th military warehouse (military unit 2447) – Ashgabat
- Military warehouse (military unit 2445) – Dushanbe
- District School of Cooks and 9th Inter-District School of NCOs for Service Dog Breeding (military unit 2421) – Dushanbe (Rissovkhoz)
- District Sanitary and Epidemiological Detachment (DSED) – Ashgabat
- District Sanitary and Epidemiological Detachment (DSED) – Dushanbe

== District Commanders ==
Incomplete list of district commanders (chiefs of troops):

- Kunitsky A. P. – 1899-1904
- Chekhovych K. I. – 1904–1906
- G. Dmokhovsky. K. — 1906–1908
- Charont V. A. – 1908–1918
- Ivanovsky V. A. – February 1923 – January 1924
- Buffalo I. S. – January 1924 – January 1926
- Radin F. G. – January 1926 – November 1926
- Babkevich P. P. — November 1926 – December 1928
- Kuznetsov A. A. — 1929–1930
- Kovalyov A. A. — 1930–1933
- Bystrykh N. M. — 1933–1934
- Kotomin Yakov Georgievich – June 1938 – April 1939
- Ryndzunsky M. M. — April 1939 – October 1942
- Kiselev A. Ya. – October 1942 – June 1943
- Shcherbina G. F. — February 1954 – May 1957
- Lapin V. Kh. – May 1957 – March 1963
- Kuzmichev F. A. — March 1963 – June 1969
- Kizhentsev N. A. – June 1969 – September 1973
- Neshumov Yu. A. – September 1973 – October 1976
- Karpov I. G. – October 1976 – January 1981
- Zgersky G. A. — 1981—1984
- Shlyakhtin V. I. — 1984–1987
- Korobeynikov I. M. — 1987–1990
- Bogdanov V. A. – February 1990 – November 1992

== Heroes of the Soviet Union ==
Military personnel of the Central Asian border district who participated in the Afghan War, awarded the title of Hero of the Soviet Union:

- Lieutenant Shagaleev Farit Sultanovich (|id=3161}} – April 8, 1982.
- Senior Sergeant Kapshuk Viktor Dmitrievich (id=2553}} – November 6, 1985.
- Lieutenant Colonel Ukhabov Valery Ivanovich (id=3156}} – November 10, 1983, posthumously.
- Captain Popkov Valery Fillipovich (id=2262}} – April 21, 1989.
- Lieutenant Colonel Nikolay Nikolaevich Lukashov (id=670}} March 17, 1988.

== See also ==
- Soviet Border Troops
- Eastern Border District
