= Paxtaobod =

Paxtaobod or Pakhtaabad may refer to the following places in Uzbekistan:

- Paxtaobod, Sirdaryo Region
- Paxtaobod, Andijan Region
