= Shirin, Uzbekistan =

Shirin
- Location in Uzbekistan
- Coordinates: 40°13′37″N 69°08′04″E
- Country: Uzbekistan
- Region: Sirdaryo Region

Population (2021)
  - Total: 18,900
- Time zone: UTC+5 (UZT)

Shirin is a city in Sirdaryo Region of Uzbekistan. Shirin is administratively designated as a city of regional significance, not part of a district. Near Shirin, there is Syrdarya Power Plant and Farkhad Dam. Its population is 18,900 (2021).

== History ==
The city was established in 1972.

The history of the city begins with a construction of power station in the early Syrdarinskaya 1970 - one of the largest power plants in the former Soviet Union.

Prior to the establishment of the city the vicinity had small rural settlements.
