= Baxt =

Baxt Baxt
- City
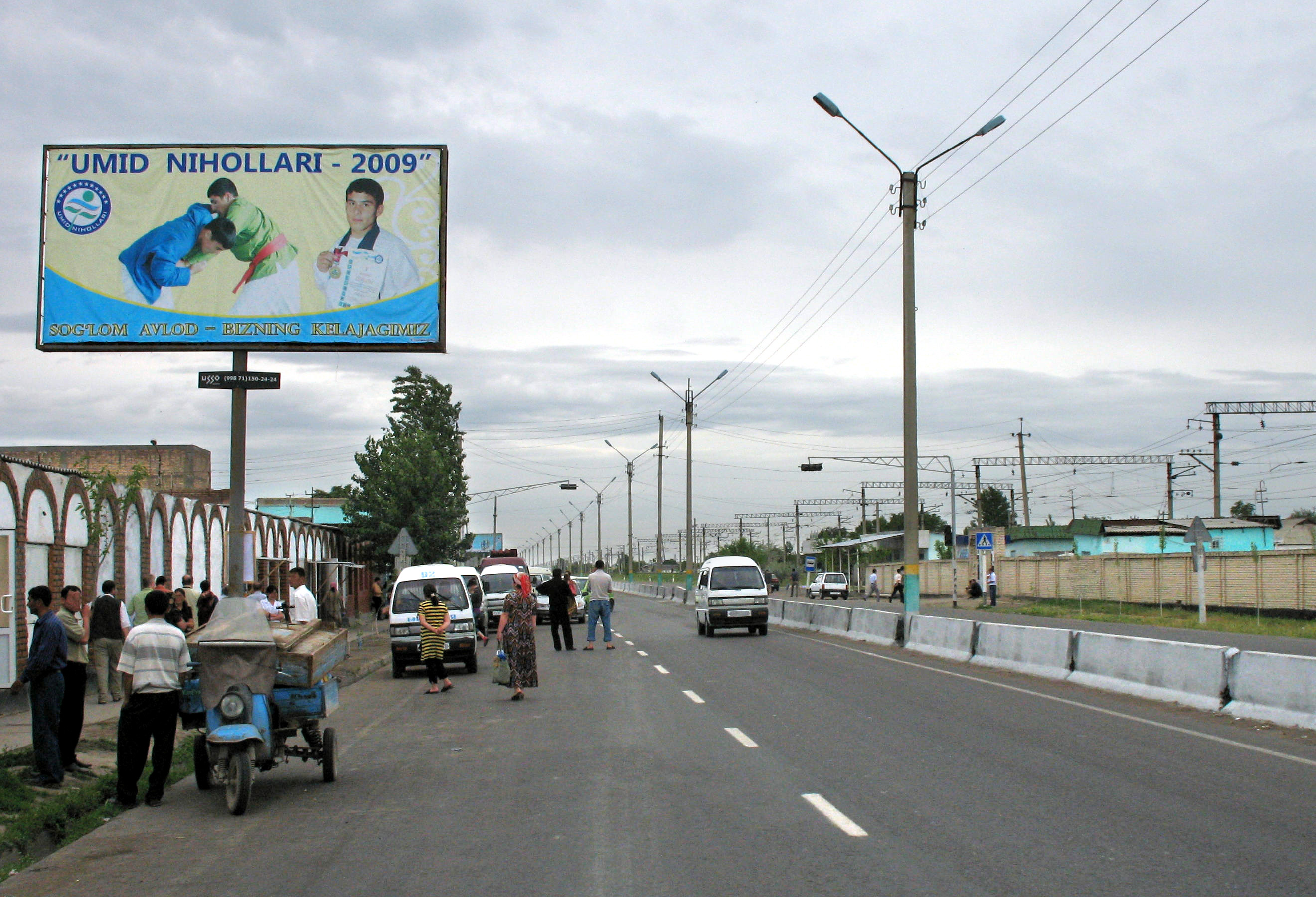
- M34 highway in Baxt

- Location in Sirdaryo Province, Uzbekistan
- Coordinates: 40°42′50″N 68°41′36″E
- Country: Uzbekistan
- Region: Sirdaryo Region
- District: Sirdaryo District
- Settlement: 1899

Population (2016)
  - Total: 17,500
- Time zone: UTC+5

Baxt (Uzbek: Baxt, Uzbek: Бахт, romanized: Bakht) is a city in Sirdaryo District of Sirdaryo Region in Uzbekistan. The estimated population in 1968 was 9,100, and 17,500 in 2016.

== History ==
Baxt was founded in 1899 as a settlement serving the passing loop #121 on the Central Asian Railway which connected Samarkand and Tashkent. In 1916, the passing loop was upgraded to a railway station. The station was named Velikoalexeyevskaya after the Russian prince Alexey, the apparent heir to the throne. In 1963, the settlement and the station were renamed Baxt (بخت which means "Happiness" in Persian). In 1980, Baxt was granted town status.

== Economy ==
=== Industry ===
As of the 1970s, in Baxt there were a construction materials plant and a cotton purification factory.

=== Transportation ===
Baxt has a railway station on a railway connecting Tashkent and Samarkand via Guliston. The M34 highway connecting Tashkent and Dushanbe passes through Baxt as well. There are also local roads.
