= Dehqonobod, Uzbekistan =

Dehqonobod
- urban-type settlement
- Location in Uzbekistan
- Coordinates: 40°31′53″N 69°02′03″E
- Country: Uzbekistan
- Region: Sirdaryo Region
- District: Guliston District
- Urban-type settlement status: 1967

Population (2000)
  - Total: 10,500
- Time zone: UTC+5 (UZT)

Dehqonobod (Uzbek: Dehqonobod/Деҳқонобод, Russian: Дехканабад) is an urban-type settlement in Sirdaryo Region, Uzbekistan. It is the administrative center of Guliston District. The town population in 1989 was 9687 people.
