= Sardoba District =

Coordinates: 40.339981°N 68.186433°E

- District
- Sardoba tumani
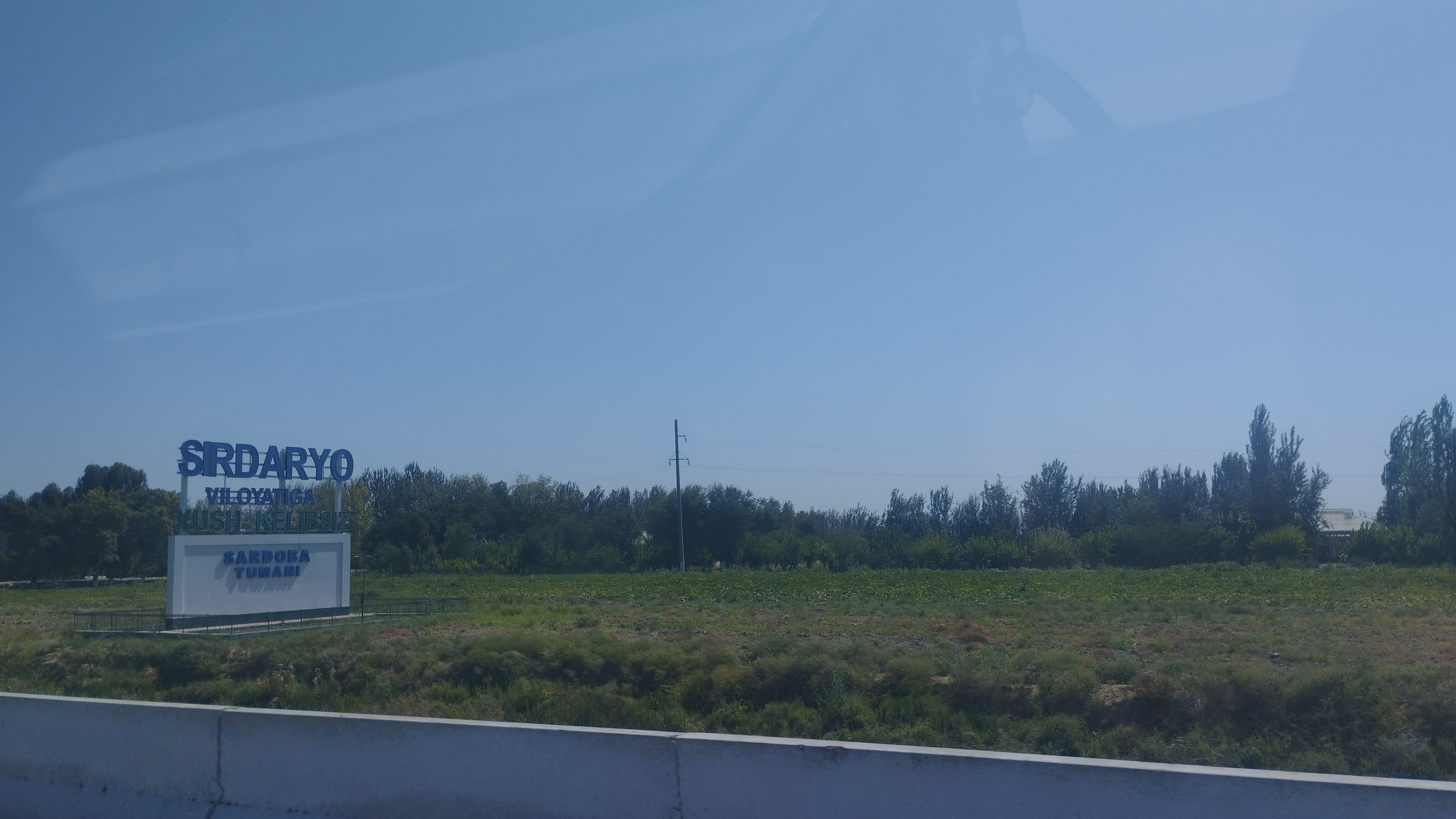

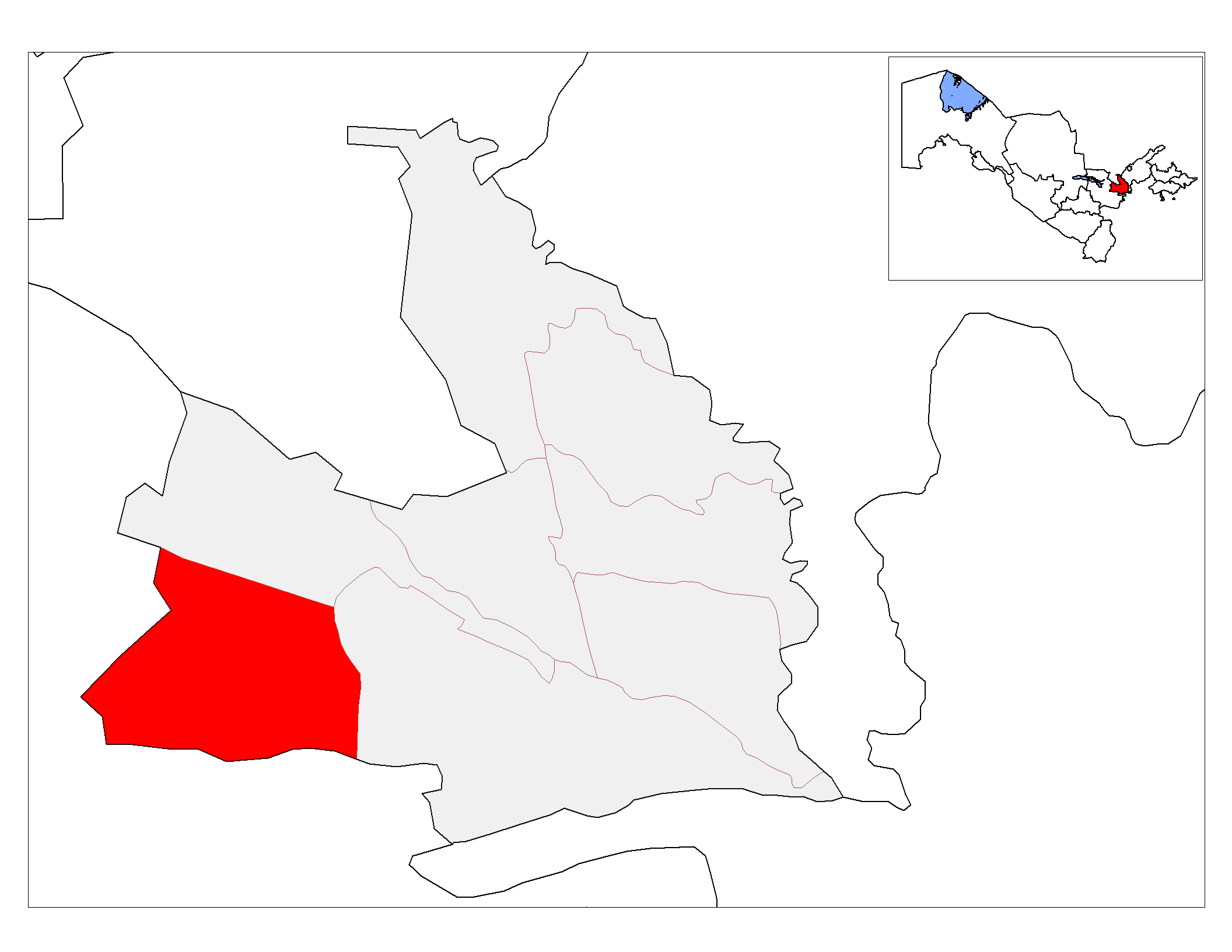
- Country: Uzbekistan
- Region: Sirdaryo Region
- Capital: Paxtaobod
- Established: 1964

Area
  - Total: 520 km^{2} (200 sq mi)

Population (2021)
  - Total: 67,000
  - Density: 130/km^{2} (330/sq mi)
- Time zone: UTC+5 (UZT)

Sardoba is a district of Sirdaryo Region in Uzbekistan. The capital lies at the town Paxtaobod. It has an area of 520 km^{2} (200 sq mi) and its population is 67,000 (2021 est.). The district consists of one urban-type settlement (Paxtaobod) and 6 rural communities.

Until 2004, the district was known as Sharof Rashidov District, commemorating the politician Sharof Rashidov.
