= Hamadoni District =

Hamadoni District Russian: Район Мир Сайид Алии Хамадони Tajik: Ноҳияи Ҳамадони
- District
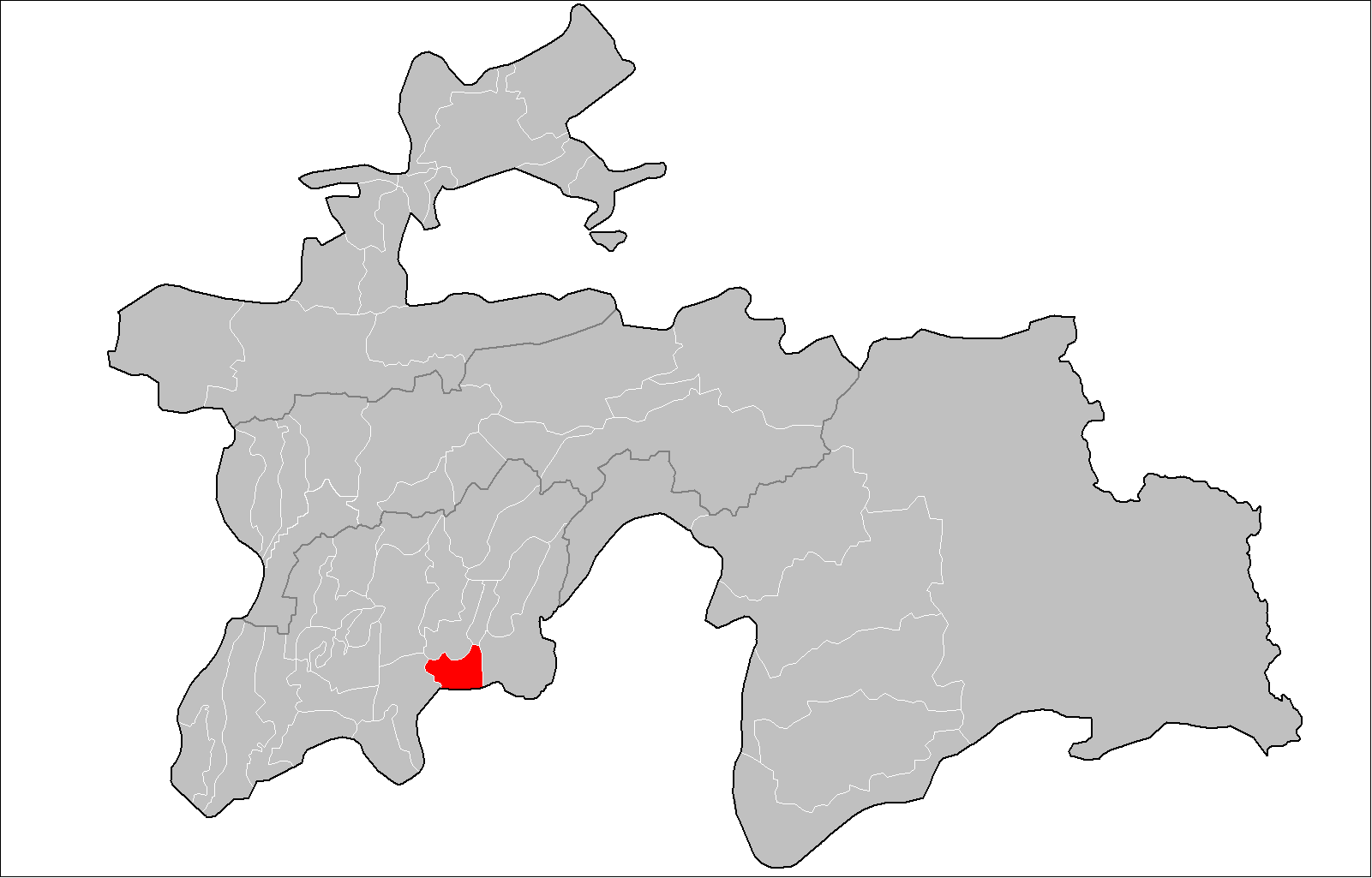
- Coordinates: 37°39′24″N 69°37′45″E
- Country: Tajikistan
- Region: Khatlon Region
- Established: 1 Jan 2014
- Capital: Moskovskiy

Area
  - Total: 500 km^{2} (190 sq mi)

Population (2020)
  - Total: 148,800
  - Density: 300/km^{2} (770/sq mi)
- Time zone: UTC+5
- Official languages: Russian (Interethnic); Tajik (State)
- Website: http://www.hamadoni.tj/ (in Russian and Tajik)

Hamadoni District (Russian: Район Мир Сайид Алии Хамадони; Tajik: Ноҳияи Ҳамадони) is a district in the south-east of Khatlon Region of Tajikistan, located south of Kulob and stretching along a section of the Panj on the border with Afghanistan. Between 1950 and 2004 it was called Moskovskiy town, then renamed in honor of Mir Sayyid Ali Hamadani, a 14th-century Persia Great Islamic preacher, traveller, poet, and scholar who preached Islam in different parts of world, and is buried in Khatlon.

The district capital is Moskovskiy or Moskva (Tajik: Маскав). The population of the district is 148,800 (January 2020 estimate).

== Administrative divisions ==
The district has an area of about 500 km^{2} (200 sq mi) and is divided administratively into one town and seven jamoats. They are as follows:

Jamoat	Population (Jan. 2015)
Moskovskiy (town)	22,500
Chubek	18,490
Dashtigulo	19,331
Mehnatobod	21,816
Panjob	10,418
Panjrud	13,092
Qahramon	18,294
Turdiev	10,385
