= M34 highway (Tajikistan) =

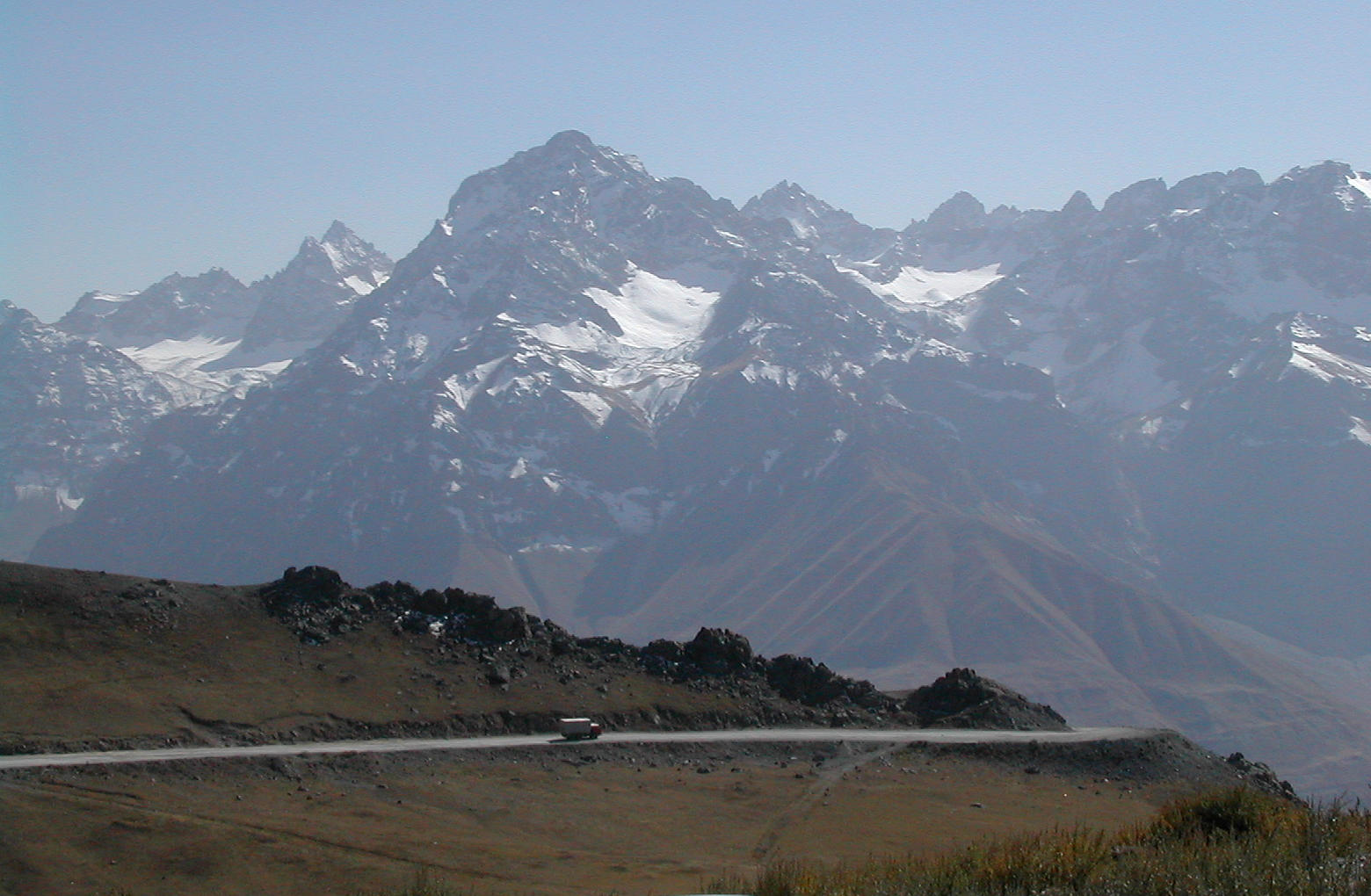
M34 near Anzob Pass

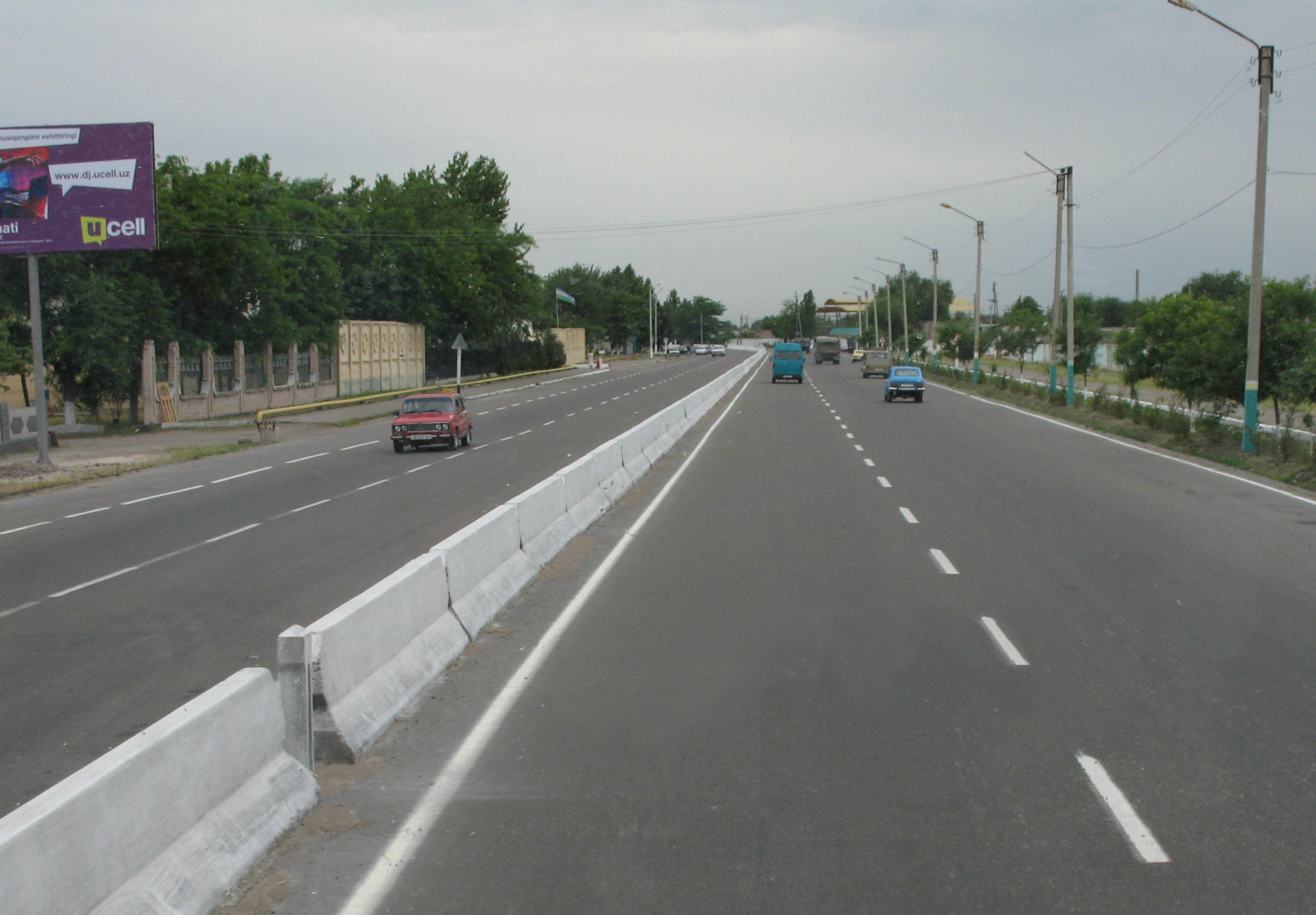
M34 in Sirdaryo

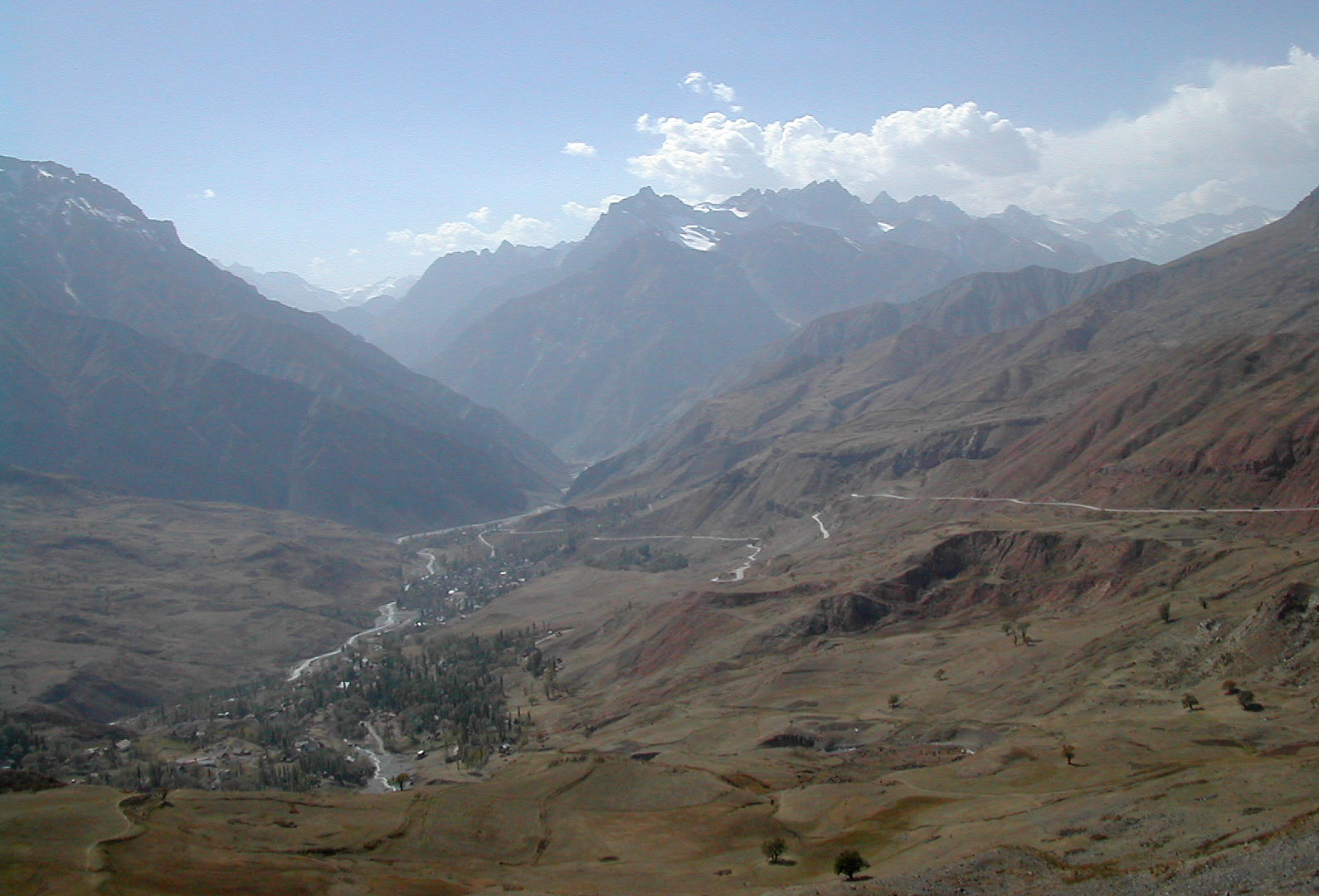
M34 south of Anzob Pass

The M34 is a major Soviet-era highway of Tajikistan and Uzbekistan, that connected the Tajik capital Dushanbe with the Uzbek capital Tashkent.

Due to the fact that with the independence of the two states, the boundary between them became an international border, the road has been cut off for a distance of approximately 30 km between Xovos and Istaravshan. Prior to 1991, the highway crossed the Uzbek-Tajik boundary 3 times between the two cities.

In Tajikistan, with the reclassification of highways after independence, 227 km of the highway have been incorporated into Highway РБ01 , connecting Dushanbe to the country's second largest city of Khujand.

In Uzbekistan, 153 km of the highway remains, and is still officially designated as "M34".

== See also ==
- Roads in Uzbekistan
- Roads in Tajikistan
