= Turdiev =

Turdiev Russian and Tajik: Турдиев
- Jamoat
- Location within Tajikistan
- Coordinates: 37°37′N 69°34′E
- Country: Tajikistan
- Region: Khatlon
- District: Hamadoni District

Population (2020)
  - Total: 11,095
- Time zone: UTC+5 (TJT)
- Official languages: Russian (Interethnic); Tajik (State)

Turdiev (Russian and Tajik: Турдиев, Persian: توردیف) is a jamoat in Tajikistan. It is located in Hamadoni District in Khatlon Region. The jamoat has a total population of 11,095 (2020).
