= Panjob =

- Village and Jamoat
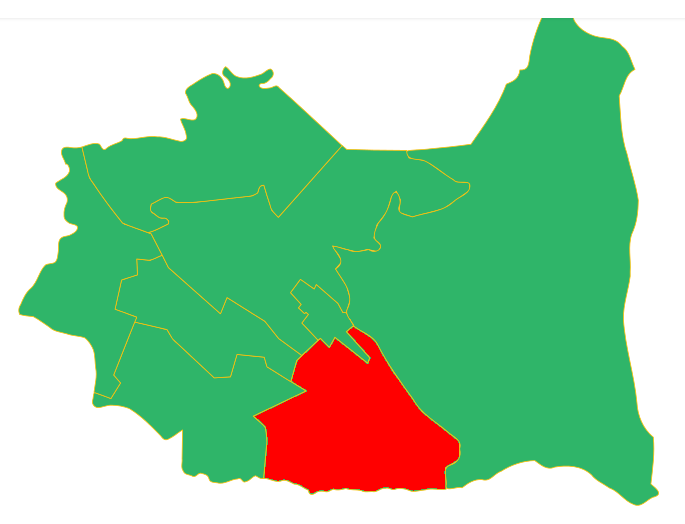
- Location of Panjob in Hamadoni District
- Country: Tajikistan
- Region: Khatlon
- District: Hamadoni District

Population (2015)
  - Total: 10,418
- Time zone: UTC+5 (TJT)
- Official languages: Russian (Interethnic); Tajik (State)

Panjob (Russian: Панджоб; Tajik: Панҷоб, Persian: پنجاب) is a village and jamoat in Tajikistan. It is located in Hamadoni District in Khatlon Region. The jamoat has a total population of 10,418 (2015).
