= Syrdarya Power Plant =

- Country: Uzbekistan
- Location: Shirin
- Coordinates: 40°13′41″N 69°6′2″E
- Status: Operational
- Decommission date: 1972
- Owner: Uzbekenergo

Thermal power station
- Primary fuel: Natural gas
- Secondary fuel: Fuel oil

Power generation
- Units operational: 8 x 325 MW, 1 x 310 MW, 1 x 305 MW
- Make and model: TAGMET; LMZ; Electrosila
- Nameplate capacity: 3,215 MW

External links
- Website: www.sdtes.uz

Syrdarya Power Plant is a natural gas-fired power plant located in Shirin, Uzbekistan. Its ten units were commissioned in 1972–1981. The installed capacity of the power plant is 3,215 MW.

Modernization of the Syrdarya Power Plant a been financed by international donors. The European Bank for Reconstruction and Development in cooperation with the Asian Development Bank financed reconstruction of two generation units by Siemens. In 2000, the Syrdarya Energy Company, now part of Uzbekenergo, was created on the basis of the Syrdarya Power Plant.

The power plant has 3 flue gas stacks, the tallest of which is 350 metres (1,150 ft).

== See also ==
- List of towers
- List of chimneys
- List of tallest freestanding structures in the world
