= Sirdaryo District =

Coordinates: 40.8500°N 68.6640°E

Sirdaryo
- District
- Sirdaryo tumani
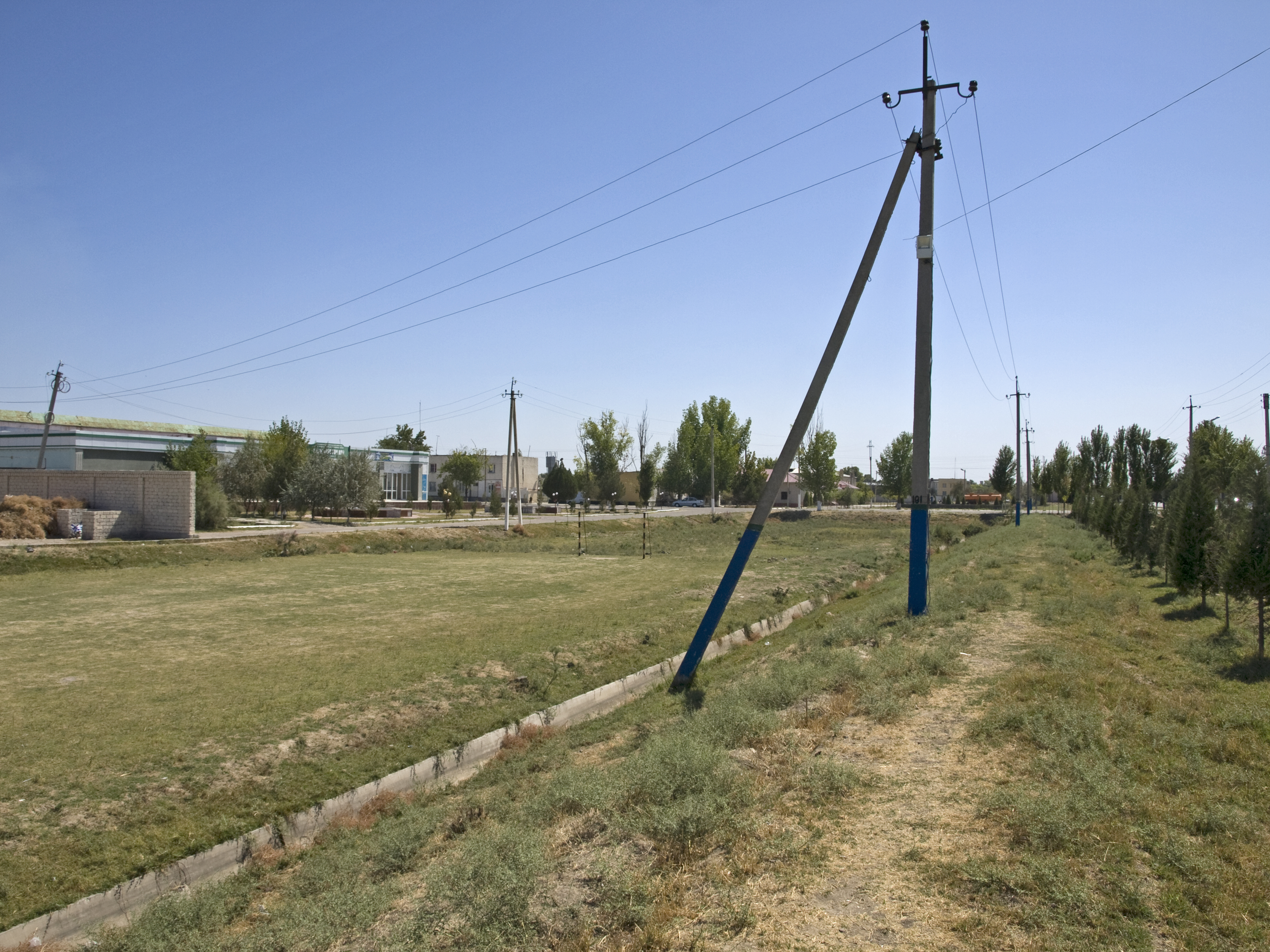
- Fields in Sirdaryo

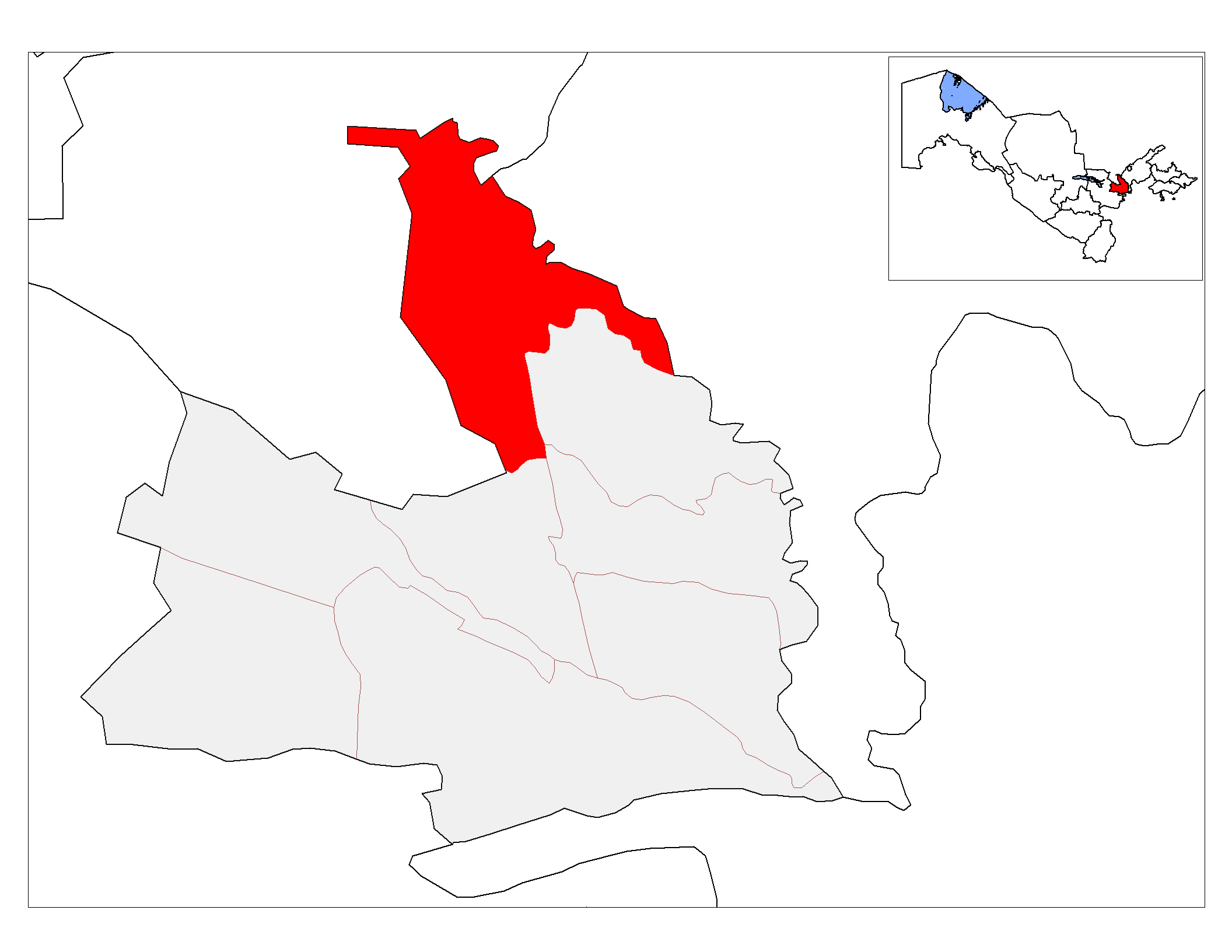
- Country: Uzbekistan
- Region: Sirdaryo Region
- Capital: Sirdaryo
- Established: 1939

Area
  - Total: 550 km^{2} (210 sq mi)

Population (2021)
  - Total: 130,100
  - Density: 240/km^{2} (610/sq mi)
- Time zone: UTC+5 (UZT)

Sirdaryo is a district of Sirdaryo Region in Uzbekistan. The capital lies at the city Sirdaryo. It has an area of 550 km^{2} (210 sq mi) and its population is 130,100 (2021 est.). The district consists of 2 cities (Sirdaryo, Baxt), 4 urban-type settlements (Quyosh, Malik, Ziyokor, J.Mamanov) and 9 rural communities.
