= Guliston District =

Coordinates: 40.4963°N 68.7746°E

Guliston
- District
- Guliston tumani
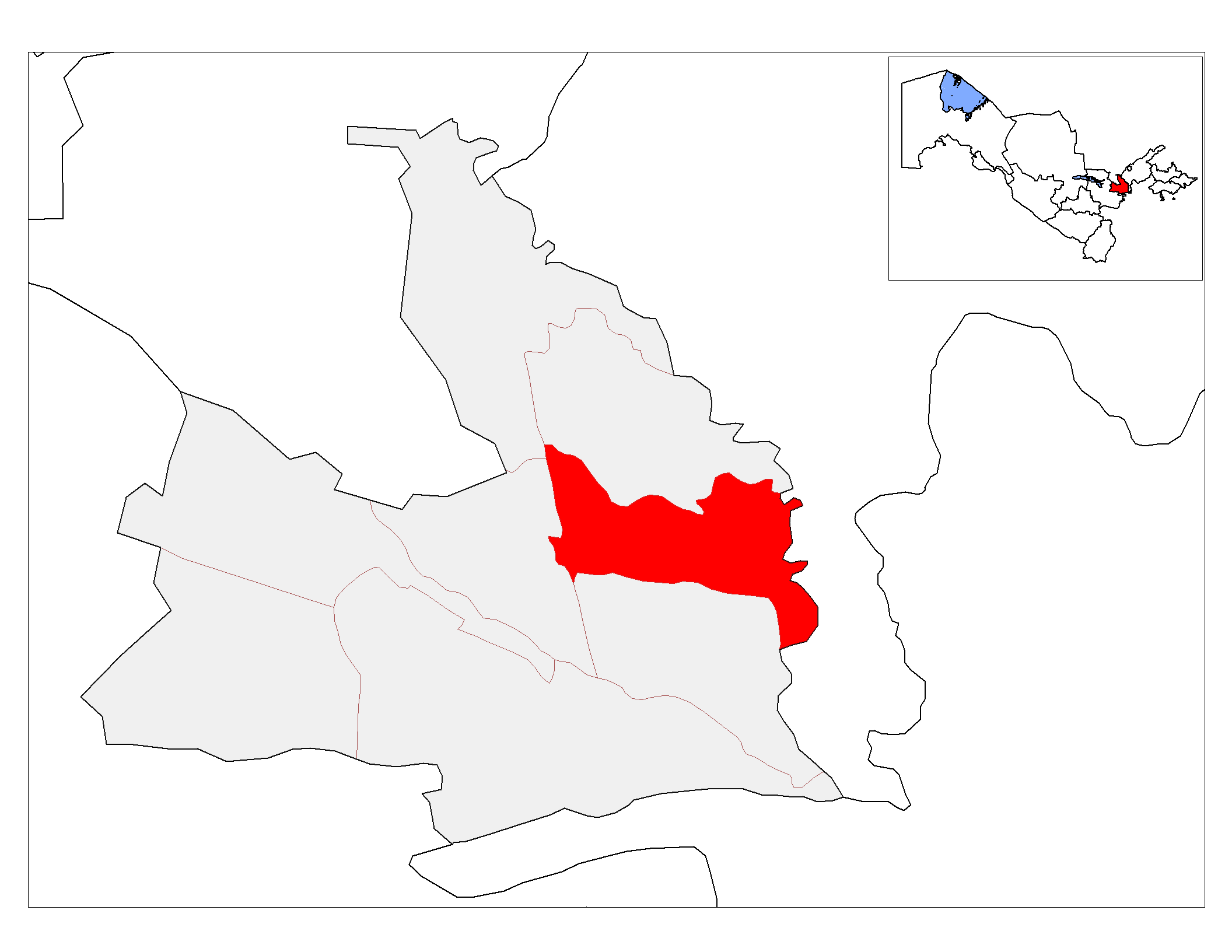
- Country: Uzbekistan
- Region: Sirdaryo Region
- Capital: Dehqonobod
- Established: 1952

Area
  - Total: 350 km^{2} (140 sq mi)

Population (2021)
  - Total: 74,100
  - Density: 210/km^{2} (550/sq mi)
- Time zone: UTC+5 (UZT)

Guliston is a district of Sirdaryo Region in Uzbekistan. The capital lies at the town Dehqonobod. It has an area of 350 km^{2} (140 sq mi) and its population is 74,100 (2021 est.). The district consists of 5 urban-type settlements (Dehqonobod, Hulkar, Beshbuloq, Ulugʻbek, Xalqakoʻl) and 9 rural communities.
