= Sayxun =

Sayxun Сайхун
- urban-type settlement
- Location in Uzbekistan
- Coordinates: 40°42′32″N 68°50′31″E
- Country: Uzbekistan
- Region: Sirdaryo Region
- District: Sayxunobod District
- Urban-type settlement status: 1984

Population (2003)
  - Total: 5,439
- Time zone: UTC+5 (UZT)

Sayxun (Uzbek: Sayxun/Сайхун, Russian: Сайхун, romanized: Saykhun) is an urban-type settlement in Sirdaryo Region, Uzbekistan. It is the administrative center of Sayxunobod District. The town population in 1989 was 4877 people.
