= Moskovskiy =

Moskovskiy Russian: Московский Tajik: Маскав
- Location in Tajikistan
- Coordinates: 37°39′24″N 69°37′45″E
- Country: Tajikistan
- Region: Khatlon
- District: Hamadoni

Population (2020)
  - Total: 23,300
- Official languages: Russian (Interethnic); Tajik (State)

Moskovskiy or Moskva (Russian: Московский; Tajik: Маскав Maskav) is a location in Tajikistan. It is the administrative capital of Hamadoni District in Khatlon Region, located at 37°39′24″N 69°37′45″E. The population of the town is 23,300 (January 2020 estimate).

Internet sources often identify Moskovskiy with Chubek, but in fact this is another village in the district, located about 5 km (3 mi) south-east from Moskva.
