= Qahramon =

Qahramon Russian: Кахрамон Tajik: Қаҳрамон
- Village and Jamoat
- Location within Tajikistan
- Coordinates: 37°41′N 69°34′E
- Country: Tajikistan
- Region: Khatlon
- District: Hamadoni District

Population (2015)
  - Total: 18,294
- Time zone: UTC+5 (TJT)
- Official languages: Russian (Interethnic); Tajik (State)

Qahramon in red

Qahramon (Russian: Кахрамон; Tajik: Қаҳрамон, Persian: قهرمان) is a village and jamoat in Tajikistan. It is located in Hamadoni District in Khatlon Region. The jamoat has a total population of 18,294 (2015).
