= Beshbuloq, Sirdaryo Region =

Beshbuloq
- urban-type settlement
- Location in Uzbekistan
- Coordinates: 40°35′20″N 69°00′20″E
- Country: Uzbekistan
- Region: Sirdaryo Region
- District: Guliston District
- Urban-type settlement status: 2009

Population (2016)
  - Total: 2,898
- Time zone: UTC+5 (UZT)

Beshbuloq is an urban-type settlement in Guliston District of Sirdaryo Region in Uzbekistan. It was granted urban-type settlement status in 2009. Its population was 2,898 people in 2016.
