= Qahramon, Uzbekistan =

Qahramon
- Village
- Location in Uzbekistan
- Coordinates: 40°18′18″N 68°36′6″E
- Country: Uzbekistan
- Region: Sirdaryo Region
- District: Xovos District

Population (2004)
  - Total: 9,000
- Time zone: UTC+5 (UZT)

Qahramon (Uzbek: Qahramon, Қаҳрамон, Russian: Кахраман) is a village in Sirdaryo Region, Uzbekistan. Until 2004 it was the seat of the Mehnatobod District; when this district was abolished, Qahramon became part of the Xovos District.
