= Sayxunobod District =

Coordinates: 40.3710°N 68.2650°E

Sayxunobod
- District
- Sayxunobod tumani
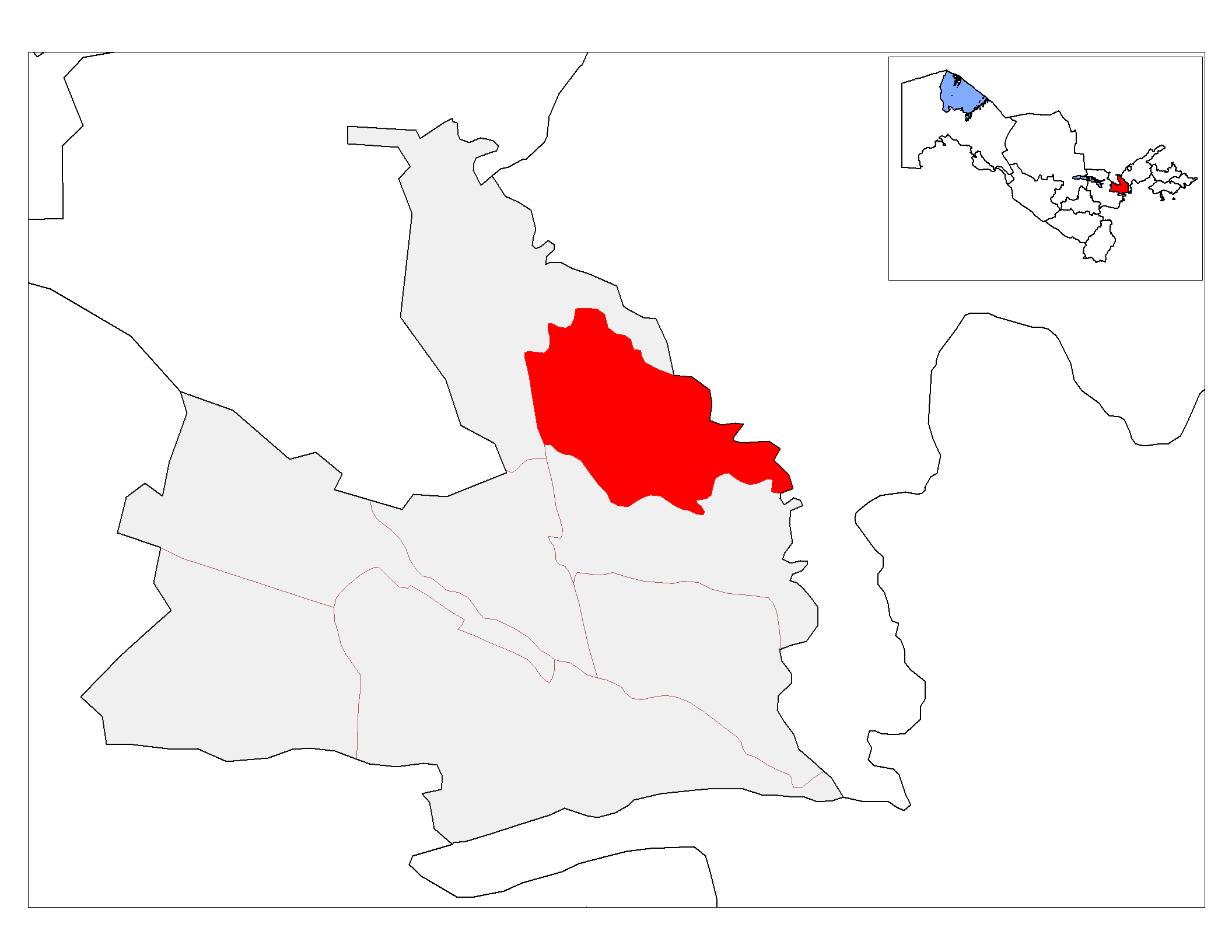
- Country: Uzbekistan
- Region: Sirdaryo Region
- Capital: Sayxun
- Established: 1952

Area
  - Total: 450 km^{2} (170 sq mi)

Population (2021)
  - Total: 78,500
  - Density: 170/km^{2} (450/sq mi)
- Time zone: UTC+5 (UZT)

Sayxunobod is a district of Sirdaryo Region in Uzbekistan. The capital is the town Sayxun. It has an area of 450 km^{2} (170 sq mi) and its population is 78,500 (2021 est.). The district consists of 4 urban-type settlements (Sayxun, Sohil, Shoʻroʻzak, Paxtakon) and 7 rural communities.
