= Panjrud =

- Jamoat
- Location within Tajikistan
- Coordinates: 37°39′N 69°34′E
- Country: Tajikistan
- Region: Khatlon Region
- District: Hamadoni District

Population (2015)
  - Total: 13,092
- Time zone: UTC+5 (TJT)
- Official languages: Russian (Interethnic); Tajik (State)

Panjrud (Russian: Панчруд; Tajik: Панҷрӯд, formerly: Kalinin Russian: Калинин) is a jamoat in Tajikistan. It is located in Hamadoni District in Khatlon Region. The jamoat has a total population of 13,092 (2015).
