= Dashtigulo =

- Village and Jamoat
- Location within Tajikistan
- Coordinates: 37°42′N 69°30′E
- Country: Tajikistan
- Region: Khatlon
- District: Hamadoni District

Population (2015)
  - Total: 19,331
- Time zone: UTC+5 (TJT)
- Official languages: Russian (Interethnic); Tajik (State)

Dashtigulo (Russian: Даштигуло; Tajik: Даштигуло, Persian: دشت گل) is a village and jamoat in Tajikistan. It is located in Hamadoni District in Khatlon Region. The jamoat has a total population of 19,331 (2015).
