= Sirdaryo =

- Town
- Location in Uzbekistan
- Country: Uzbekistan
- Region: Sirdaryo Region
- Town status: 1971

Population (2016)
  - Total: 28,800
- Time zone: UTC+5 (UZT)

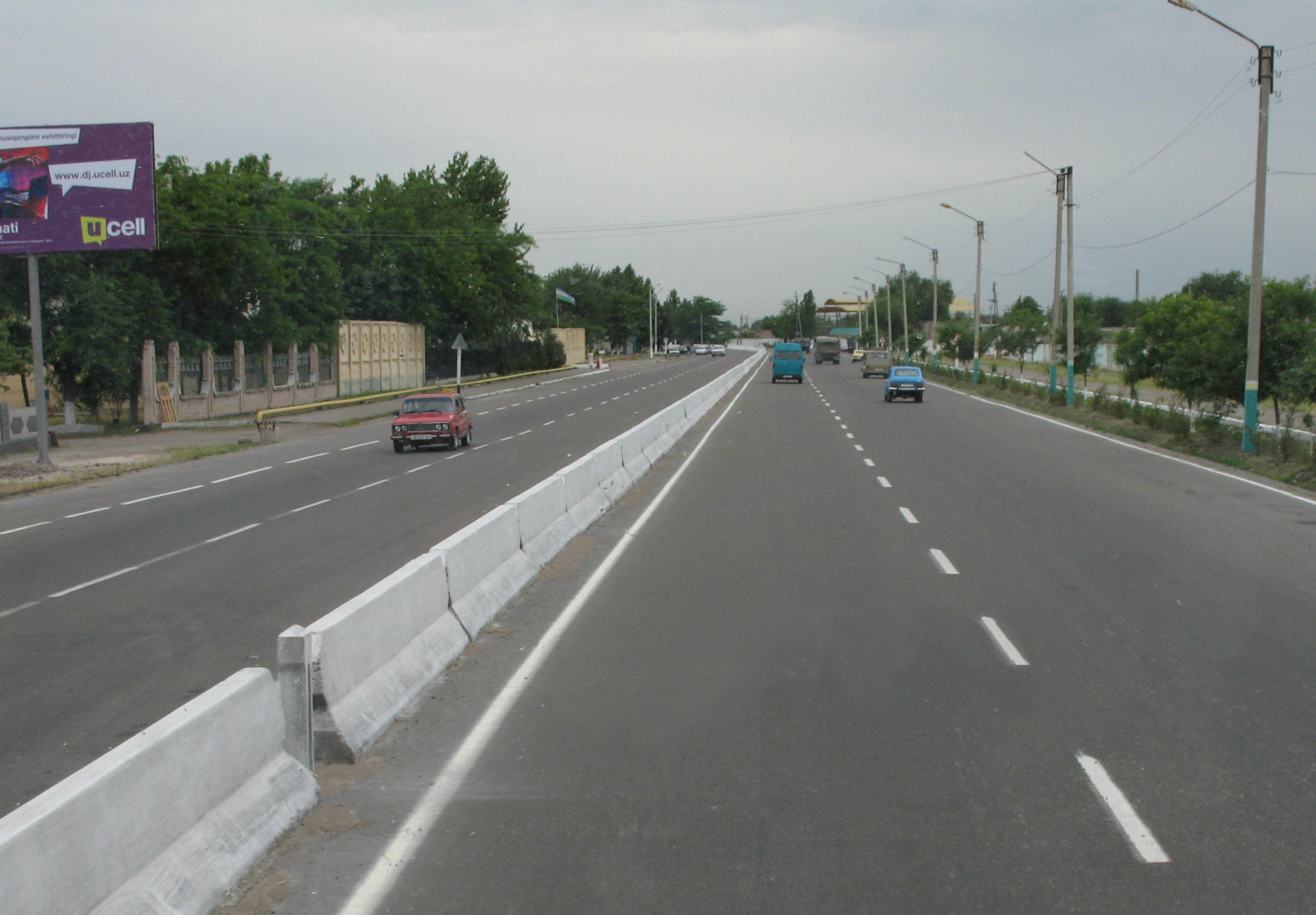
M34 in Sirdaryo

Sirdaryo (Uzbek: Sirdaryo / Сирдарё; Russian: Сырдарья, romanized: Syrdarya) is a city in Sirdaryo Region of Uzbekistan. It serves as the administrative center of Sirdaryo District. Its population is 28,800 (2016).

== Climate ==
Sirdaryo has a hot-summer Mediterranean climate (Köppen climate classification Csa).

Climate data for Sirdaryo (1991–2020 normals, extremes 1938–present)
Month	Jan	Feb	Mar	Apr	May	Jun	Jul	Aug	Sep	Oct	Nov	Dec	Year
Record high °C (°F)	21.2 (70.2)	27.0 (80.6)	32.5 (90.5)	37.6 (99.7)	40.1 (104.2)	44.6 (112.3)	43.9 (111.0)	43.0 (109.4)	40.4 (104.7)	35.2 (95.4)	31.6 (88.9)	28.0 (82.4)	44.6 (112.3)
Mean daily maximum °C (°F)	5.5 (41.9)	8.6 (47.5)	16.1 (61.0)	23.0 (73.4)	29.5 (85.1)	35.0 (95.0)	36.5 (97.7)	35.0 (95.0)	29.8 (85.6)	22.5 (72.5)	13.5 (56.3)	6.6 (43.9)	21.8 (71.2)
Daily mean °C (°F)	0.8 (33.4)	3.1 (37.6)	9.8 (49.6)	16.1 (61.0)	21.8 (71.2)	26.8 (80.2)	28.0 (82.4)	25.8 (78.4)	20.3 (68.5)	13.7 (56.7)	6.9 (44.4)	1.8 (35.2)	14.6 (58.2)
Mean daily minimum °C (°F)	−2.9 (26.8)	−1.3 (29.7)	4.3 (39.7)	9.6 (49.3)	14.1 (57.4)	17.9 (64.2)	19.0 (66.2)	16.8 (62.2)	11.3 (52.3)	6.4 (43.5)	1.8 (35.2)	−2.0 (28.4)	7.9 (46.2)
Record low °C (°F)	−27.2 (−17.0)	−29.0 (−20.2)	−11.6 (11.1)	−2.4 (27.7)	0.1 (32.2)	4.0 (39.2)	10.6 (51.1)	4.7 (40.5)	0.0 (32.0)	−5.1 (22.8)	−18.2 (−0.8)	−23.5 (−10.3)	−29.0 (−20.2)
Average precipitation mm (inches)	39.7 (1.56)	52.7 (2.07)	53.1 (2.09)	46.7 (1.84)	28.9 (1.14)	7.7 (0.30)	2.2 (0.09)	1.6 (0.06)	4.3 (0.17)	16.6 (0.65)	37.3 (1.47)	45.8 (1.80)	336.6 (13.24)
Average precipitation days (≥ 1.0 mm)	12	11	12	11	8	4	2	1	2	6	9	11	89
Source 1: Погода и Климат
Source 2: NOAA
