= Navroʻz =

Urban-type settlement in Sirdaryo Region, Uzbekistan

- urban-type settlement
- Location in Uzbekistan
- Coordinates: 40°28′42″N 68°45′38″E
- Country: Uzbekistan
- Region: Sirdaryo Region
- District: Mirzaabad District

Population (2016)
  - Total: 2,200
- Time zone: UTC+5 (UZT)

Navroʻz (Uzbek: Navroʻz, Russian: Навруз, romanized: Navruz) is an urban-type settlement in Sirdaryo Region, Uzbekistan. It is the administrative center of Mirzaabad District. Its population was 2,166 people in 1989, and 2,200 in 2016.
