= Oqoltin District =

Coordinates: 40.6700°N 68.8830°E

Oqoltin
- District
- Oqoltin tumani
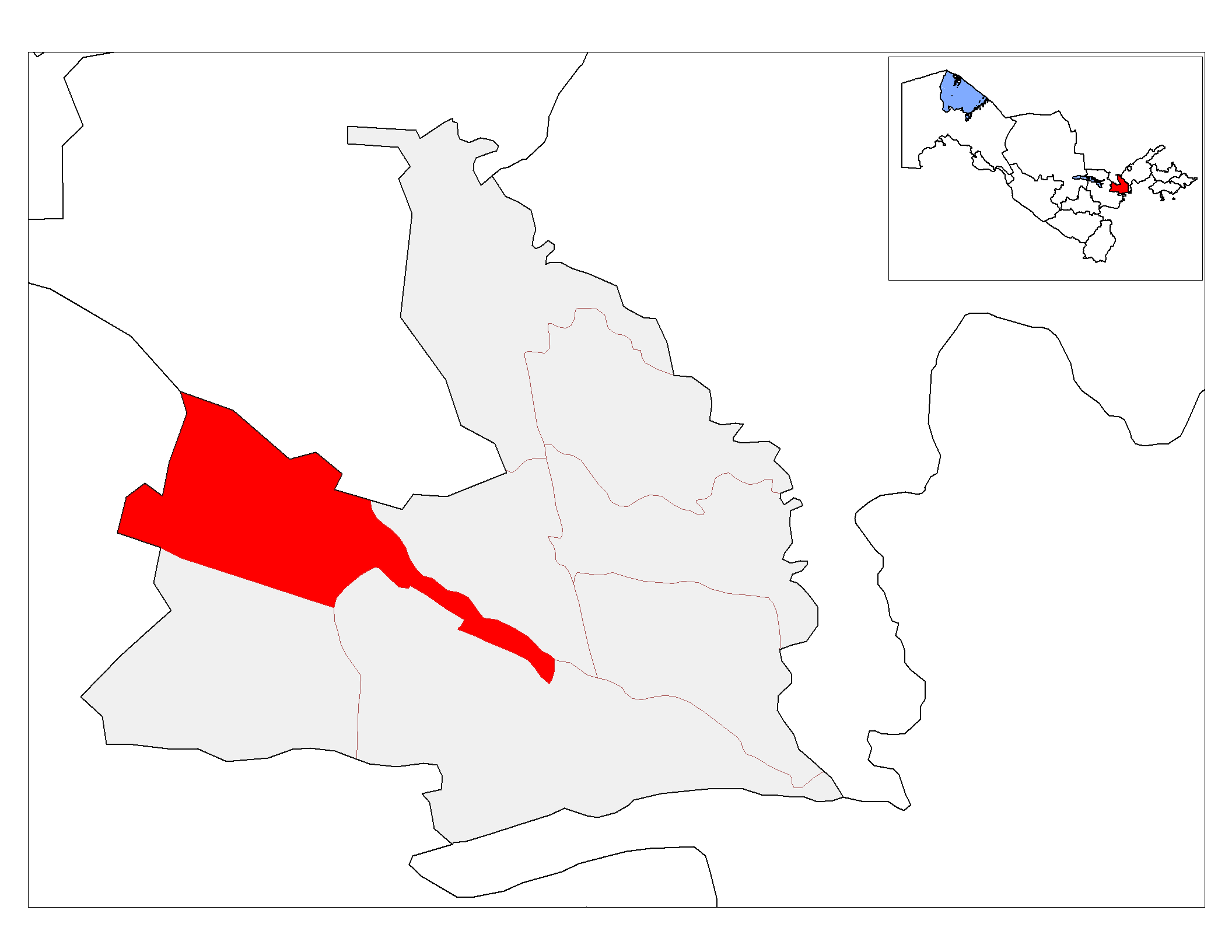
- Country: Uzbekistan
- Region: Sirdaryo Region
- Capital: Sardoba
- Established: 1971

Area
  - Total: 550 km^{2} (210 sq mi)

Population (2021)
  - Total: 52,900
  - Density: 96/km^{2} (250/sq mi)
- Time zone: UTC+5 (UZT)

Oqoltin (Uzbek: Oqoltin tumani, Russian: Акалтынский район, romanized: Akaltynsky rayon) is a district of Sirdaryo Region in Uzbekistan. The capital lies at the town Sardoba. It has an area of 550 km^{2} (210 sq mi) and its population is 52,900 (2021 est.). The district consists of 3 urban-type settlements (Sardoba, Fargʻona, Andijon) and 3 rural communities.
