= Mehnatobod, Hamadoni District =

Mehnatobod
- Village and Jamoat
- Location within Tajikistan
- Coordinates: 37°43′N 69°33′E
- Country: Tajikistan
- Region: Khatlon
- District: Hamadoni District

Population (2015)
  - Total: 21,816
- Time zone: UTC+5 (TJT)
- Official languages: Russian (Interethnic); Tajik (State)

Mehnatobod (Russian: Мехнатобод; Tajik: Меҳнатобод, Persian: محنت‌آباد) is a village and jamoat in Tajikistan. It is located in Hamadoni District in Khatlon Region. The jamoat has a total population of 21,816 (2015).
