= Sardoba =

Urban-type settlement in Sirdaryo Region, Uzbekistan

- urban-type settlement
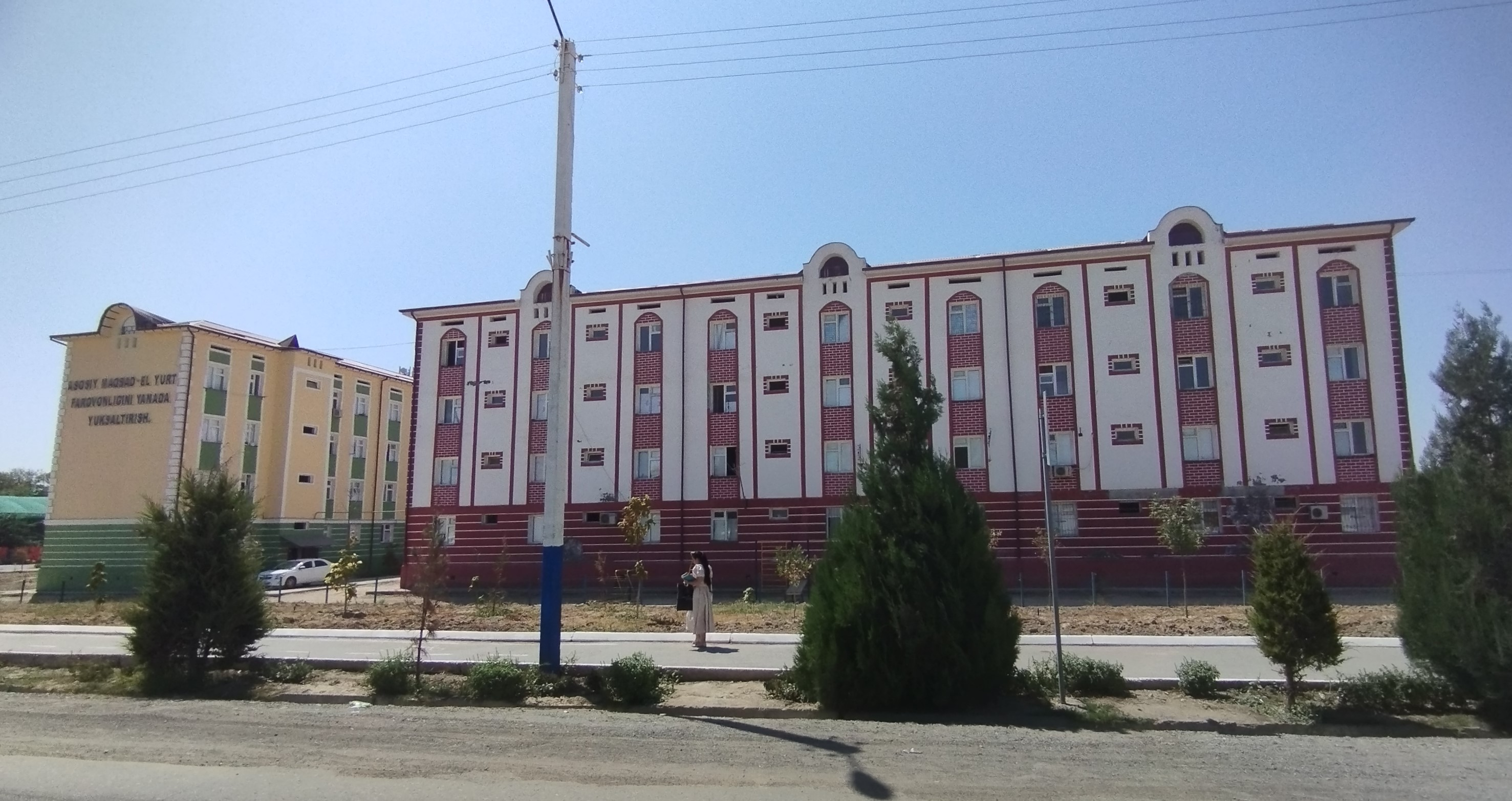

- Location in Uzbekistan
- Coordinates: 40°32′32″N 68°24′45″E
- Country: Uzbekistan
- Region: Sirdaryo Region
- District: Oqoltin District

Population (2016)
  - Total: 16,000
- Time zone: UTC+5 (UZT)

Sardoba (Uzbek: Sardoba/Сардоба, Russian: Сардаба, romanized: Sardaba) is an urban-type settlement in Sirdaryo Region, Uzbekistan. It is the administrative center of Oqoltin District. Its population was 11,337 people in 1989, and 16,000 in 2016.
