= Chubek =

- Village and Jamoat
- Location within Tajikistan
- Coordinates: 37°37′N 69°42′E
- Country: Tajikistan
- Region: Khatlon
- District: Hamadoni District

Population (2015)
  - Total: 18,490
- Time zone: UTC+5 (TJT)
- Official languages: Russian (Interethnic); Tajik (State)

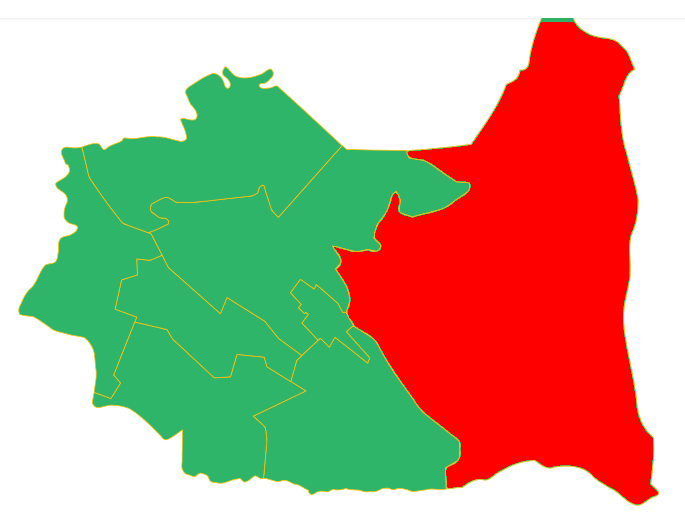
Map showing the location of Chubek jamoat in Hamadoni District, Tajikistan

Chubek (Russian and Tajik: Чубек, Persian: چوبک) is a village and jamoat in Tajikistan. It is located in Hamadoni District in Khatlon Region. The jamoat has a total population of 18,490 (2015).
