= Xovos District =

Coordinates: 40.2200°N 68.8400°E

Xovos
- District
- Xovos tumani
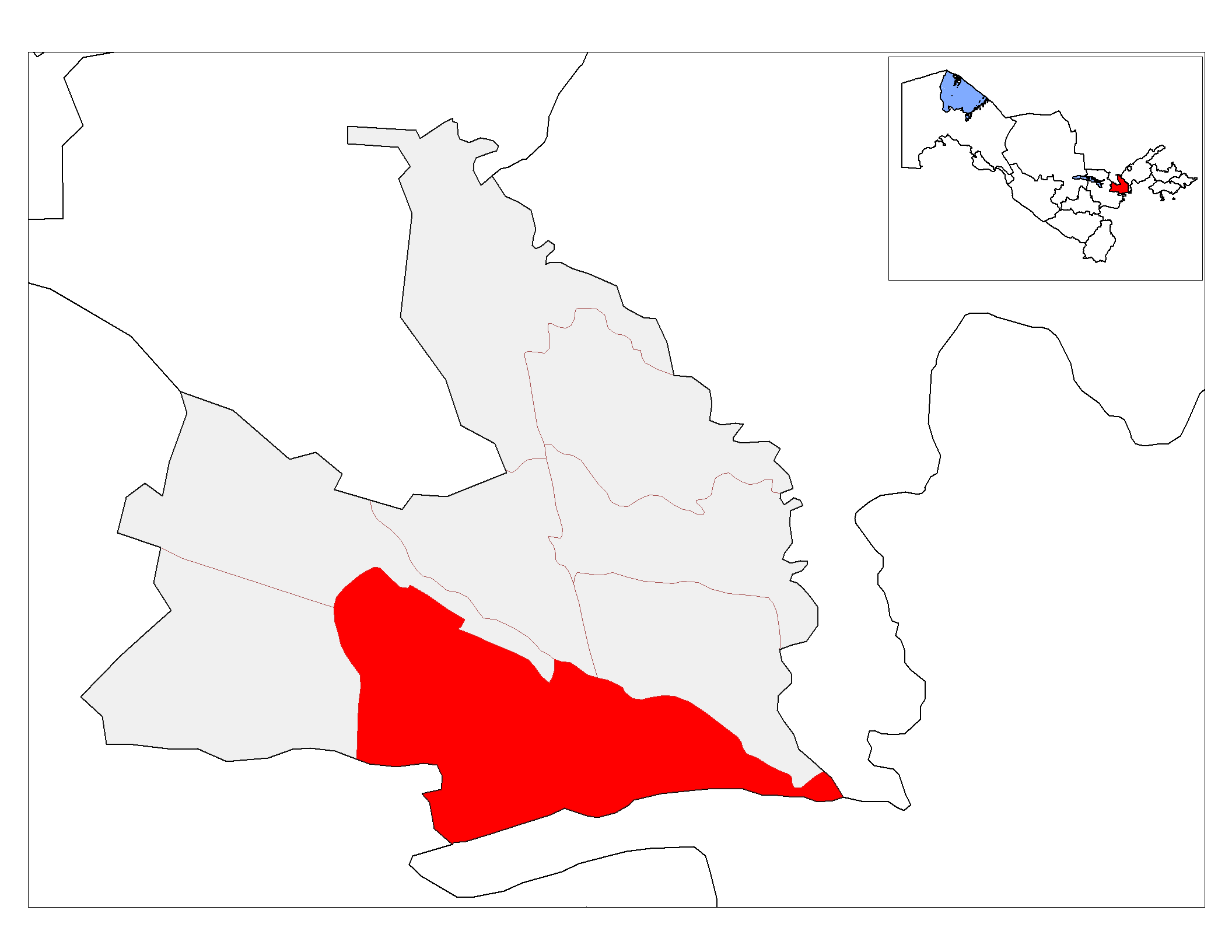
- Country: Uzbekistan
- Region: Sirdaryo Region
- Capital: Xovos
- Established: 1926

Area
  - Total: 620 km^{2} (240 sq mi)

Population (2021)
  - Total: 97,100
  - Density: 160/km^{2} (410/sq mi)
- Time zone: UTC+5 (UZT)

Xovos is a district of Sirdaryo Region in Uzbekistan. The capital lies at the town Xovos. It has an area of 620 km^{2} (240 sq mi) and its population is 97,100 (2021 est.). The district consists of 2 urban-type settlements (Xovos, Gulbahor) and 11 rural communities (incl. Qahramon).
