= Xovos =

- urban-type settlement
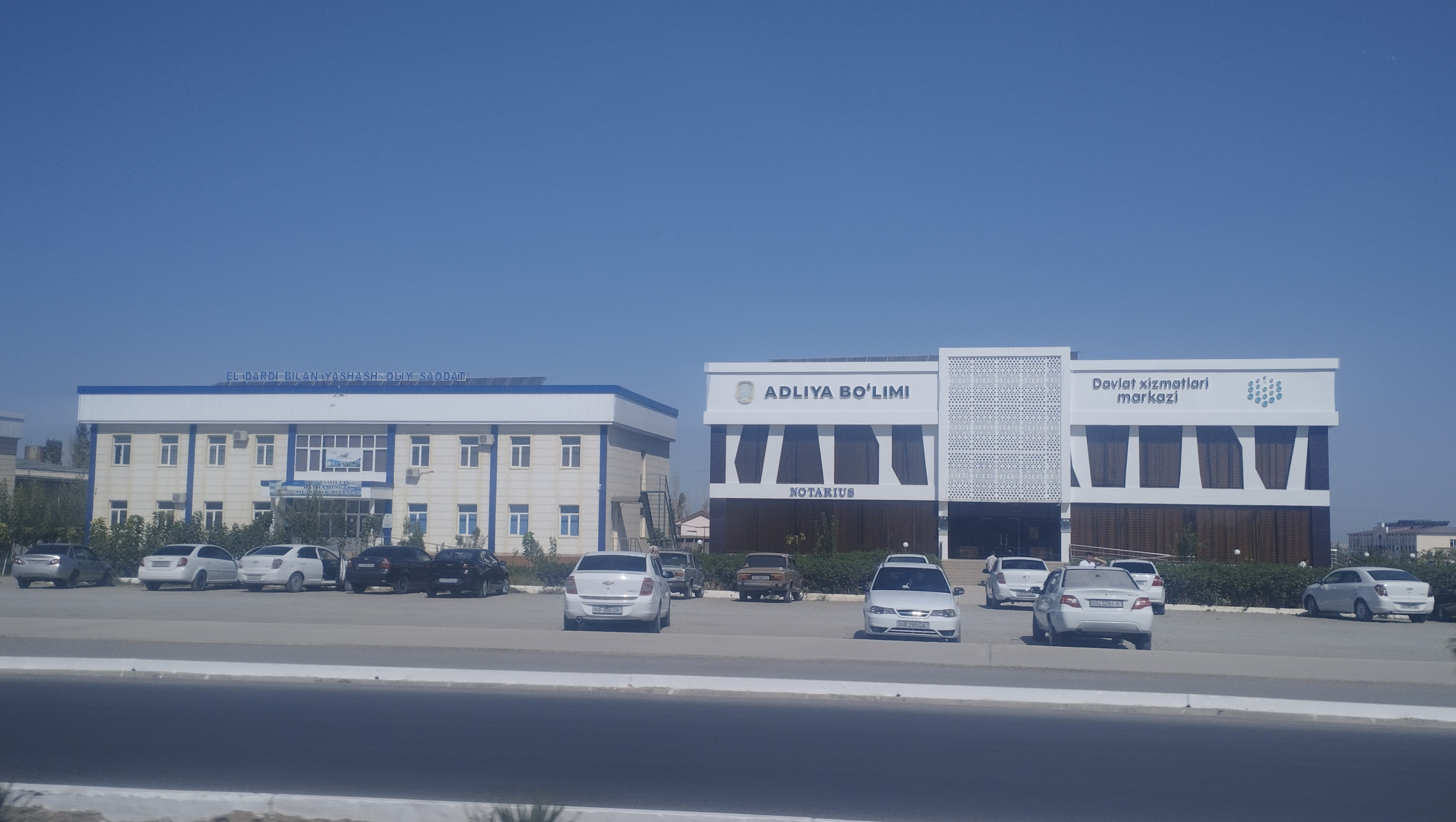

- Location in Uzbekistan
- Coordinates: 40°13′11″N 68°50′24″E
- Country: Uzbekistan
- Region: Sirdaryo Region
- District: Xovos District
- Urban-type settlement: 1960

Population (2004)
  - Total: 27,300
- Time zone: UTC+5 (UZT)
- Postal code: 120711

Xovos (Uzbek: Xovos, Russian: Хаваст, romanized: Khavast) is an urban-type settlement in Sirdaryo Region, Uzbekistan. It is the administrative center of Xovos District.

== History ==
The history of the region starts with the construction of railroad by the Russian Empire in 1889. The name itself was derived from a nearby village of the same name 3 kilometres southwards, which can be traced back to late 18th century.

== Demographics ==
The population of Khavast consists mainly of people with uzbek backgrounds, with up to 40 % of it being of Tajik backgrounds.

=== Recent developments ===
Following the official visit of the president of the Republic of Uzbekistan, Shavkat Mirziyoyev to Khavast on February 19, 2019, a large scale developments started in the town, the most notably 30 five-storey residential buildings, consisting of approximately 760 apartments and housing more than two thousand residents. The President also pointed out the pressing problems of water supply equipment in the town, and promised to take additional measures to address them. The visit sparked the developments and the construction nearly completed as of November 2019, making Khavast the town with one of the most affordable housing prices in whole Sirdaryo Region.
