= Boyovut =

- urban-type settlement
- Location in Uzbekistan
- Coordinates: 40°16′56″N 69°1′6″E
- Country: Uzbekistan
- Region: Sirdaryo Region
- District: Boyovut District
- Urban-type settlement: 1984

Population (2000)
  - Total: 13,800
- Time zone: UTC+5 (UZT)

Boyovut (Uzbek: Boyovut/Боёвут, Russian: Баяут, romanized: Bayaut) is an urban-type settlement in Sirdaryo Region, Uzbekistan. It is the administrative center of Boyovut District. The town population in 1989 was 7592 people.
