= Paxtaobod, Sirdaryo Region =

Urban-type settlement in Sirdaryo Region, Uzbekistan

Paxtaobod
- urban-type settlement
- Location in Uzbekistan
- Coordinates: 40°20′43″N 68°11′33″E
- Country: Uzbekistan
- Region: Sirdaryo Region
- District: Sardoba District
- Urban-type settlement status: 1984

Population (2000)
  - Total: 12,200
- Time zone: UTC+5 (UZT)

Paxtaobod (Uzbek: Paxtaobod/Пахтаобод, Russian: Пахтаабад, romanized: Pakhtaabad) is an urban-type settlement in Sirdaryo Region, Uzbekistan. It is the administrative center of Sardoba District. The town population in 1989 was 10196 people.
