= Boyovut District =

Coordinates: 40.3940°N 68.9540°E

Boyovut
- District
- Boyovut tumani
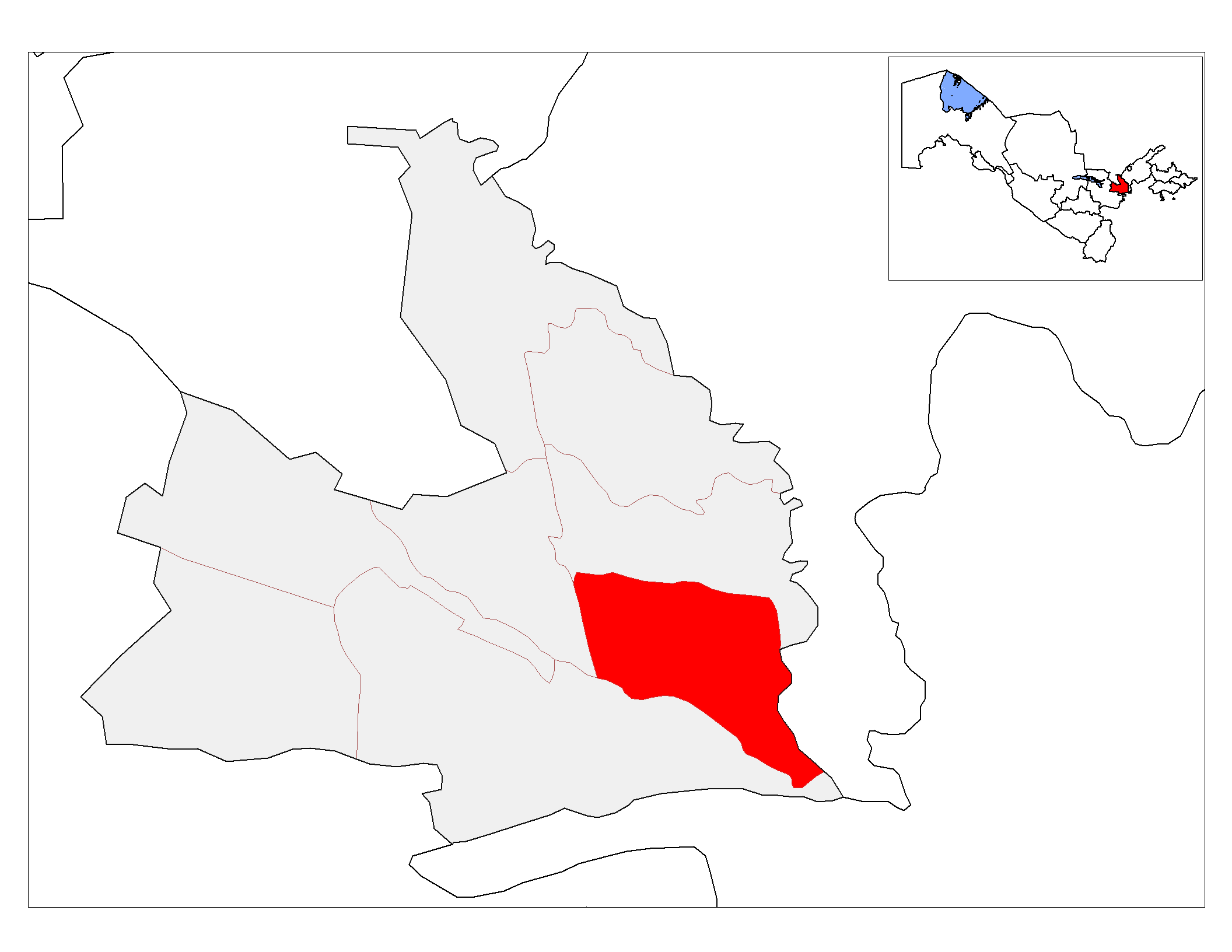
- Country: Uzbekistan
- Region: Sirdaryo Region
- Capital: Boyovut
- Established: 1955

Area
  - Total: 520 km^{2} (200 sq mi)

Population (2021)
  - Total: 131,700
  - Density: 250/km^{2} (660/sq mi)
- Time zone: UTC+5 (UZT)

Boyovut (Uzbek: Boyovut tumani / Боёвут тумани, Russian: Баяутский район, romanized: Bayautsky rayon) is a district of Sirdaryo Region in Uzbekistan. The capital lies at the town Boyovut. It has an area of 520 km^{2} (200 sq mi) and its population is 131,700 (2021 est.). The district consists of 4 urban-type settlements (Boyovut, Markaz, Bekat, Doʻstlik) and 12 rural communities.
