= Mirzaobod District =

Coordinates: 40.5130°N 68.6510°E

Mirzaobod
- District
- Mirzaobod tumani
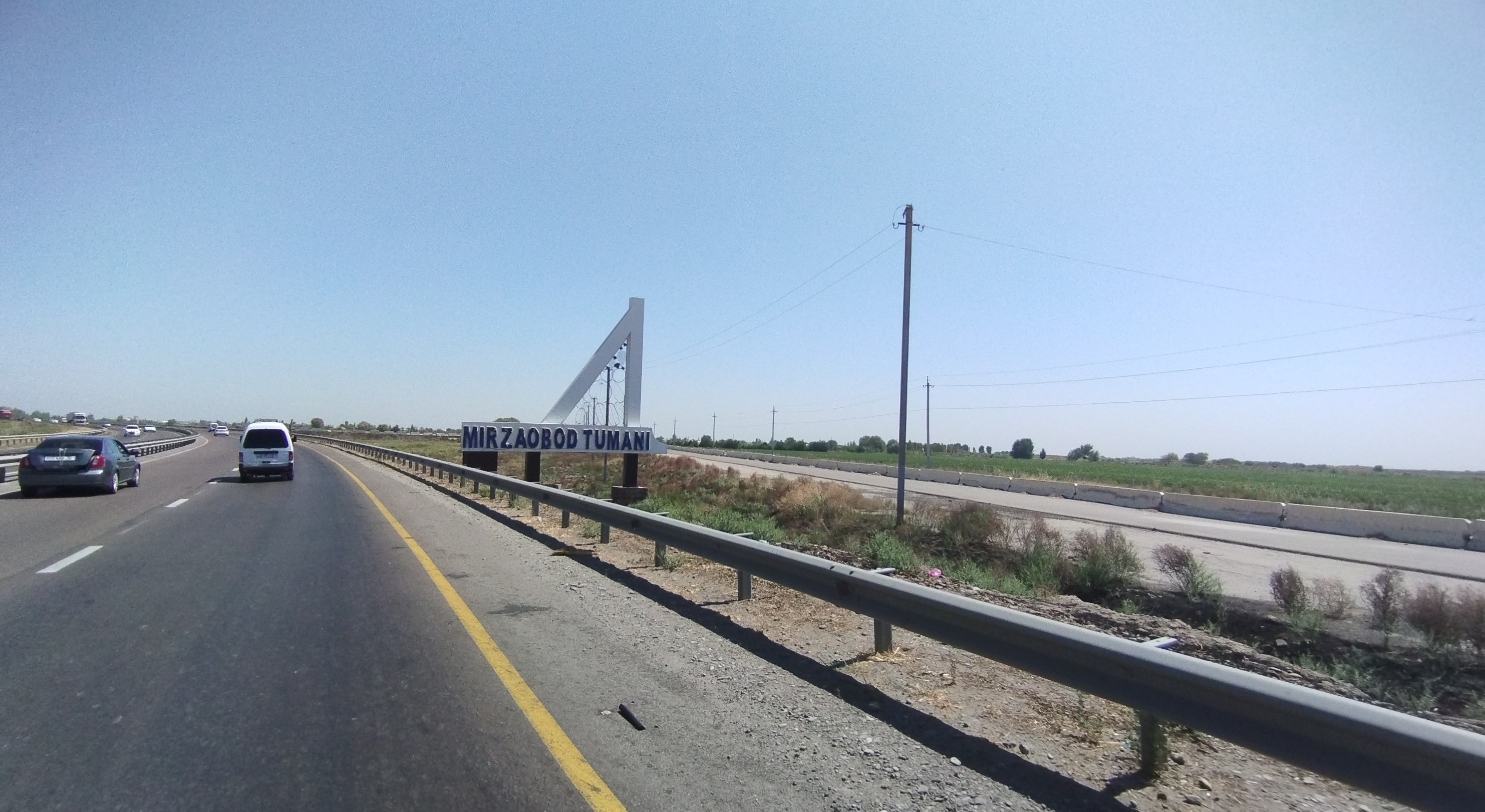

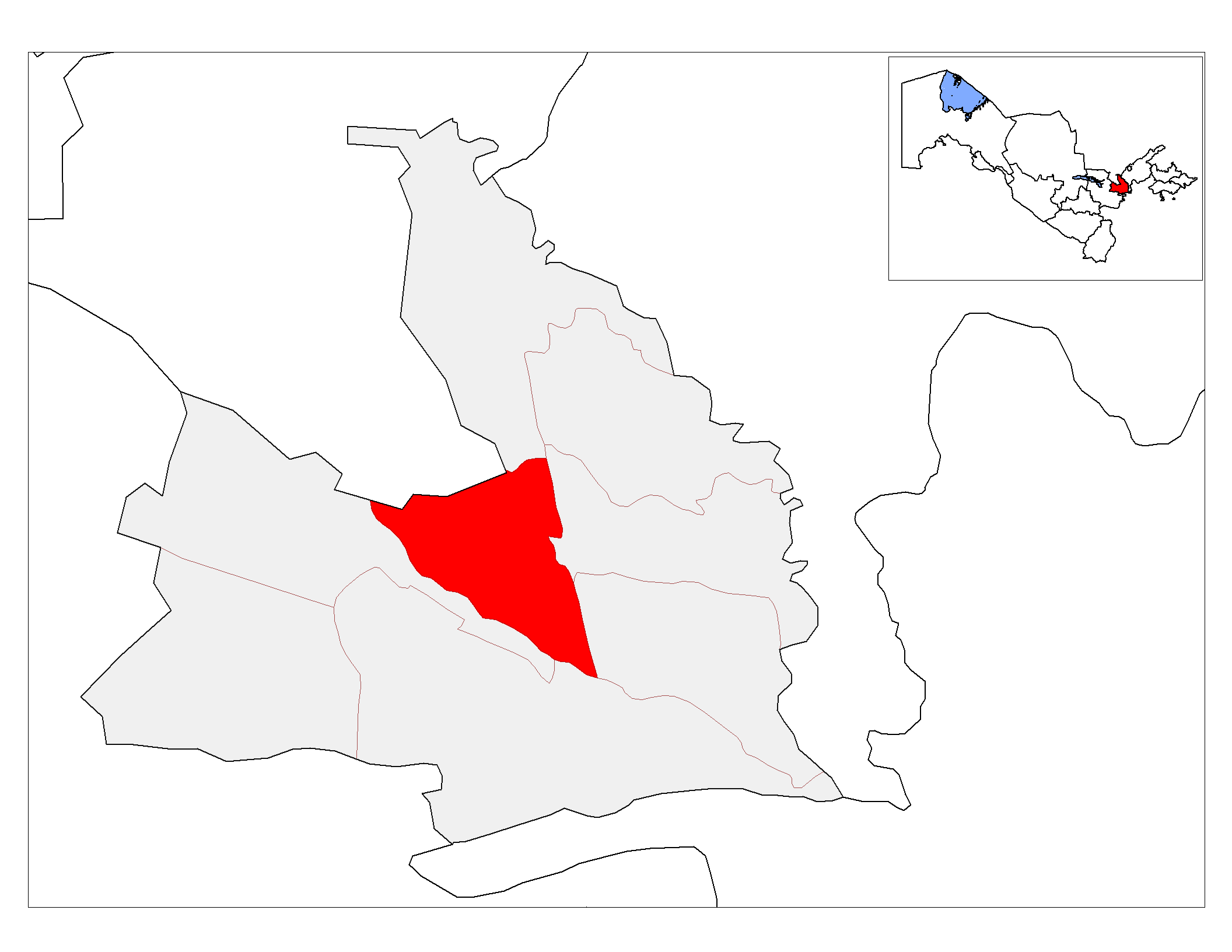
- Country: Uzbekistan
- Region: Sirdaryo Region
- Capital: Navroʻz
- Established: 1988

Area
  - Total: 640 km^{2} (250 sq mi)

Population (2021)
  - Total: 75,100
  - Density: 120/km^{2} (300/sq mi)
- Time zone: UTC+5 (UZT)

Mirzaobod is a district of Sirdaryo Region in Uzbekistan. The capital lies at the town Navroʻz. It has an area of 640 km^{2} (250 sq mi) and its population is 75,100 (2021 est.). The district consists of 2 urban-type settlements (Navroʻz, Oqoltin) and 9 rural communities.

== Nature ==
Mirzaabad district is located in the Mirzachol plain. The surface of the earth is flat (average height 250 m), covered with loess sand and kumlokdar. The climate is continental. The average temperature in July is 28°, and in January -2° to -4°. Annual rainfall is 200–300 mm. Groundwater is salty and brackish. The soil is mainly gray soil. Among the natural plants, such as cypress, yantok, reed, sedge, sedge, etc. grow on the edge of sedges.Forest cat, badger, centipede, bat, lizard and snakes can be found here. There are ducks, mallards, pheasants, sparrows and other birds.

The population is mainly Uzbeks, as well as representatives of Russian, Tatar, Tajik, Kazakh, Azerbaijani and other nationalities. There are 94 people per 1 km^{2}.

The basis of the economy is mining, the leading sector is cotton growing. Grains, vegetables, potatoes, fruits, grapes, potatoes are also grown. The main cultivated area of the district is 44,426 ha, of which irrigated land is 24,043 ha. There are 10 companies, 43 peasant farms, 5 private farms, and 2 livestock joint-stock companies in Mirzaabad district. The district has 3 industries, 2 construction enterprises, 37 private enterprises, a farmer's market, a People's Bank building, a stadium, and a tennis court. About 30 general education schools, vocational schools, and 2 lyceums for gifted children operate. 3 hospitals, 5 rural medical centers, central polyclinic serve the people.
