= Sirdaryo Region =

Region of Uzbekistan

Sirdaryo Region Sirdaryo viloyati Сирдарё вилояти
- region
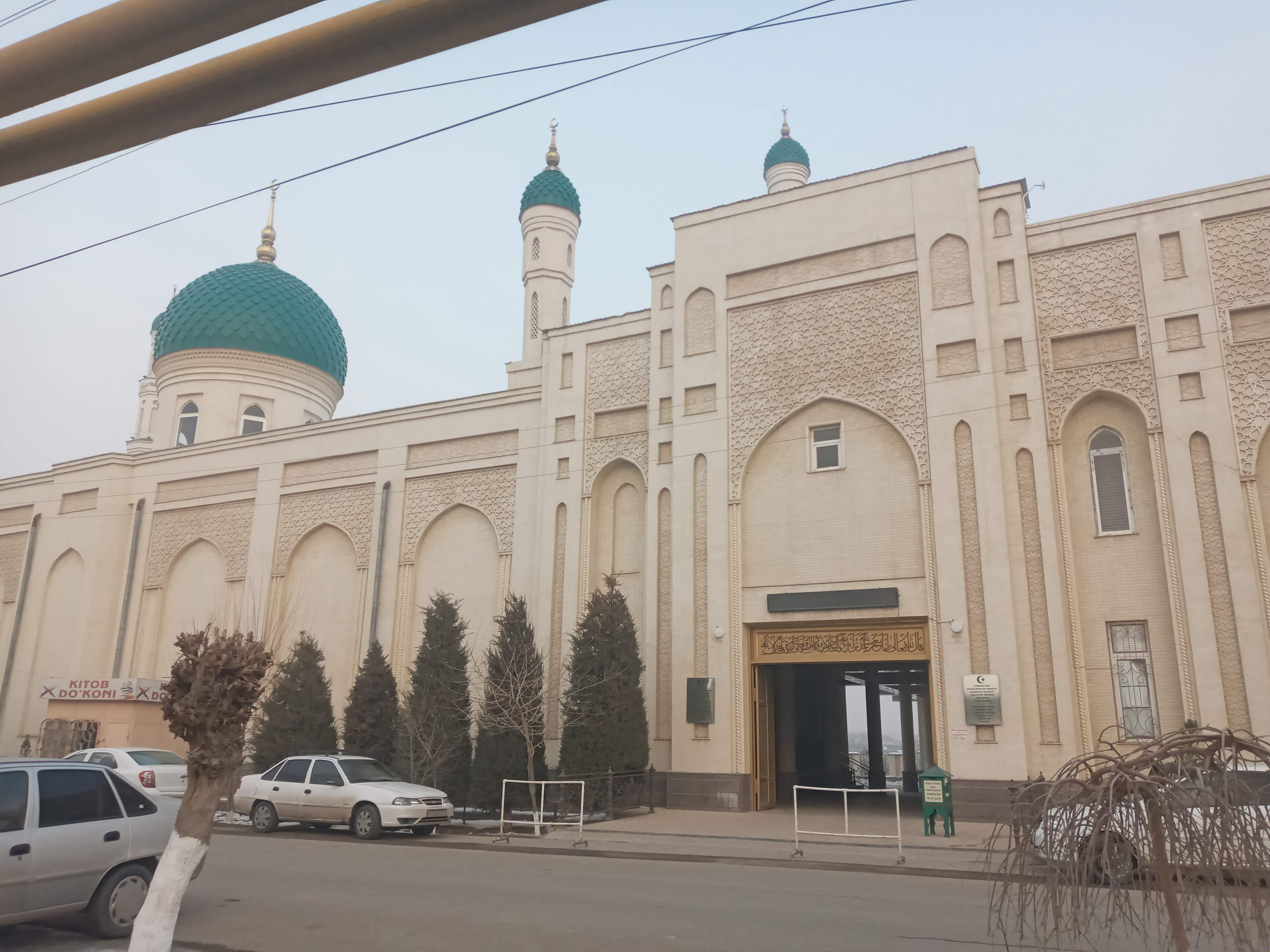
- Guliston Mosque

- Sirdaryo in Uzbekistan
- Coordinates: 40°25′N 68°40′E
- Country: Uzbekistan
- Capital: Guliston

Government
  - Hokim: Erkinjon Turdimov

Area
  - Total: 5,276 km^{2} (2,037 sq mi)
- Elevation: 267 m (876 ft)

Population (2021)
  - Total: 860,900
  - Density: 163.2/km^{2} (422.6/sq mi)
- Time zone: UTC+5 (East)
  - Summer (DST): UTC+5 (not observed)
- ISO 3166 code: UZ-SI
- Districts: 9
- Cities: 5
- Townships: 6
- Villages: 75
- Website: sirdaryo.uz

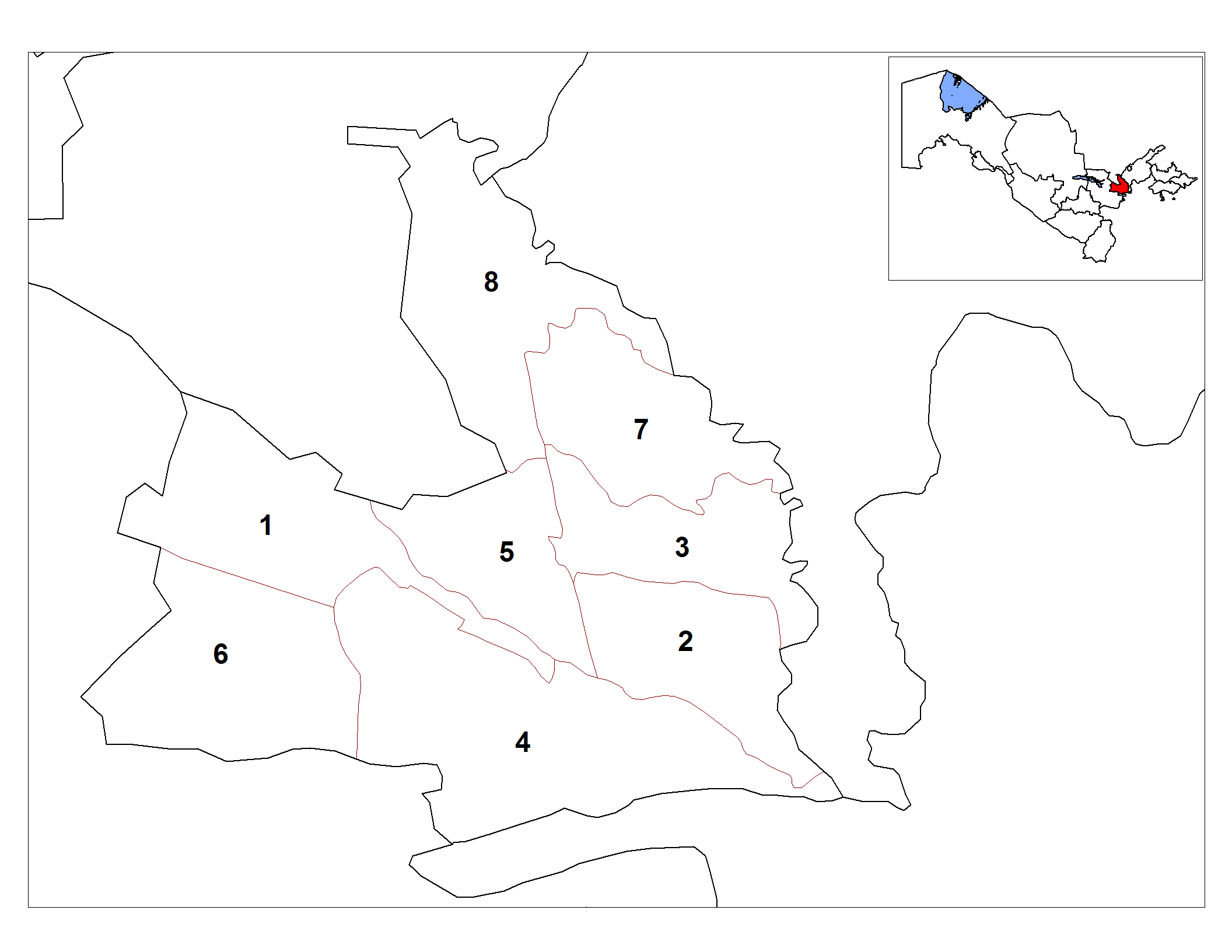
Districts of Sirdaryo Region

Sirdaryo Region (Uzbek: Sirdaryo viloyati) is one of the regions of Uzbekistan, located in the center of the country on the left bank of the Syr Darya. It borders with Kazakhstan, Tajikistan, Tashkent Region, and Jizzakh Region. It covers an area of 4,276 square kilometres (1,651 mi^{2}), and is mostly desert, with the Mirzachoʻl taking up a significant part of the region's area. The population is estimated to be 860,900 (2021).

Established on February 16, 1963.

The capital is the city of Guliston (pop. est. 91,300, 2021). Other cities and towns include Baxt, Boyovut, Farhod, Qahramon, Sayxun, Sirdaryo, Khavast, Shirin and Yangiyer.

== Demography ==
The population of the region is distributed along the main highway, which divides the whole region into two parts: the western and the eastern. The population in mainly Uzbek, with Tajik minorities on the border in the south with Tajikistan (mainly Khavast district).

== Administration ==
The Sirdaryo Region consists of 8 districts (listed below) and three district-level cities: Guliston, Shirin and Yangiyer.

| Key | District name | District name (uzbek) | District capital |
|---|---|---|---|
| 1 | Oqoltin District | Oqoltin tumani | Sardoba |
| 2 | Boyovut District | Boyovut tumani | Boyovut |
| 3 | Guliston District | Guliston tumani | Dehqonobod |
| 4 | Xovos District | Xovos tumani | Xovos |
| 5 | Mirzaobod District | Mirzaobod tumani | Navroʻz |
| 6 | Sardoba District | Sardoba tumani | Paxtaobod |
| 7 | Sayxunobod District | Sayxunobod tumani | Sayxun |
| 8 | Sirdaryo District | Sirdaryo tumani | Sirdaryo |

There are 5 cities (Guliston, Shirin, Yangiyer, Sirdaryo, Baxt) and 25 urban-type settlements in the Sirdaryo Region. In 2004 the Mehnatobod District was abolished and its territory was divided between the Mirzaobod District and the Xovos District.

== Climate ==
The climate is a typically arid continental climate with extreme differences between winter and summer temperatures.

== Economy ==
The economy is based on cotton and cereal crops, with strong reliance on irrigation and on cattle breeding. Minor crops include forage plants, vegetables, melons, gourds, potatoes, maize, a variety of fruit and grapes. Industry consists of construction materials, irrigation equipment and raw-cotton processing.

Syrdarya contains one of Uzbekistan's largest hydroelectric power plants, which generates one third of the country's electricity.
