= List of people and organizations sanctioned in relation to human rights violations in Belarus =

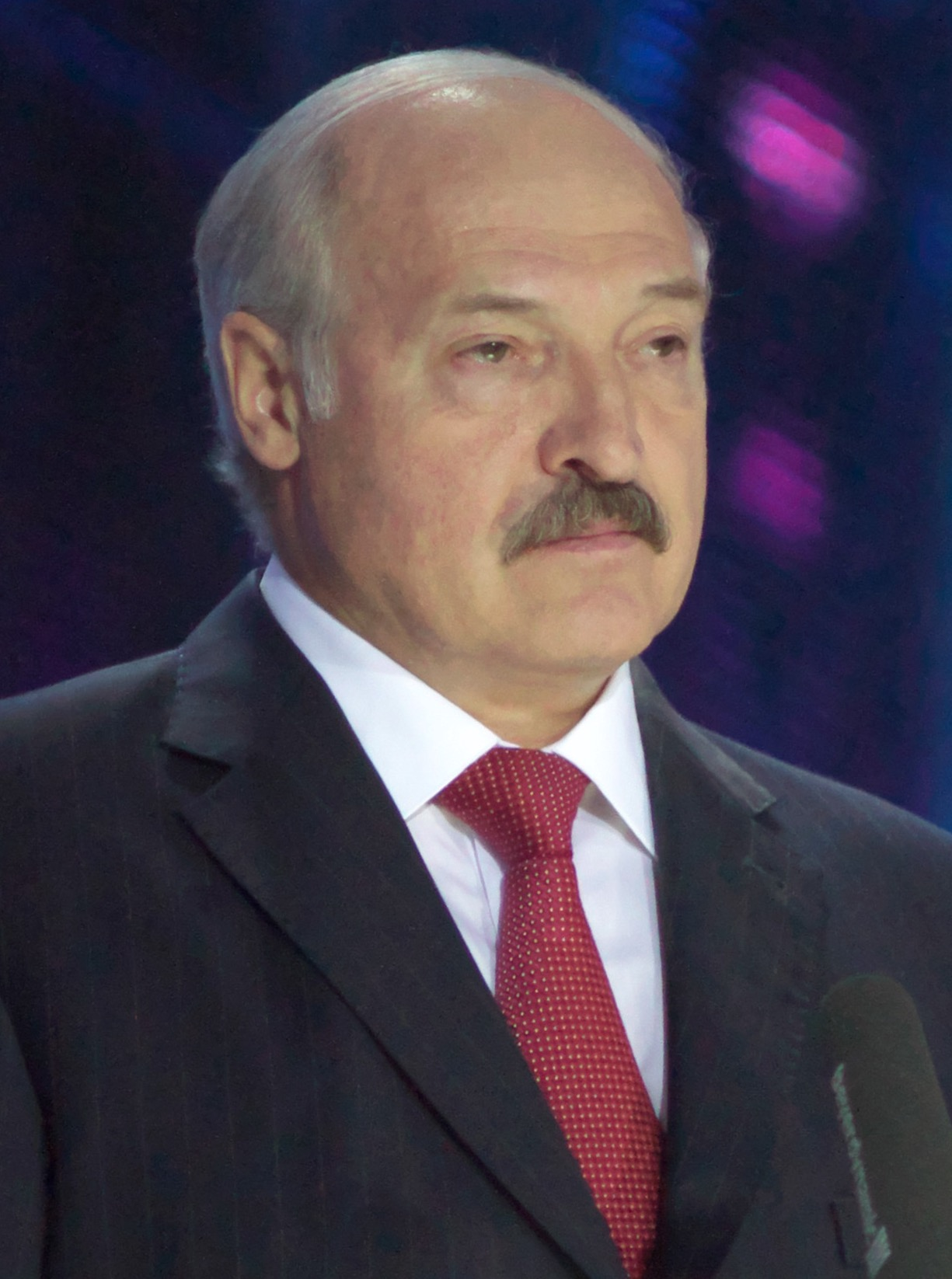
Alexander Lukashenko, President of Belarus since the 1994 election

Since the 1990s, Belarus has been actively criticized by the United States, the European Union, the OSCE and the United Nations for human rights violations and electoral fraud. Various Belarusian officials, businesspeople with links to the authoritarian regime of Alexander Lukashenko and their companies have been subject to various sanctions involving asset freeze and travel bans.

== US sanctions ==
=== Individuals ===
==== Political leadership, propaganda ====
Name	Position	Main accusations	Remarks
Alexander Lukashenko	President of Belarus		
Lidia Yermoshina	Chair of the Central Election Commission of Belarus	Central figure behind massive centralized election fraud in Belarus	
Natalia Petkevich	First Deputy Head of the Administration of the President of Belarus in 2004–2010		
Viktor Lukashenko	Assistant/Aide to the President in National Security Affairs. Son of President Alexander Lukashenko		
Alexander Radkov	Former Minister of Education, now leader of the Belaya Rus movement and Deputy Head of the Presidential Administration		
Vladimir Rusakevich	Deputy Head of the Presidential Administration		
Alexander Zimovsky	Former Head of the National State Television and Radio Company of the Republic of Belarus, adviser on propaganda		

==== Law enforcement ====
Name	Position	Main accusations	Remarks
Yuri Podobed	Former commander of Minsk riot police unit	Violence against demonstrators in the late 1990s and early 2000s	
Uladzimir Navumau	Minister of Internal Affairs of Belarus in 2000–2009	Responsible for repressions against opposition activists during the 2004 referendum campaign, 2006 presidential elections, etc.	
Viktor Sheiman	Former Secretary of the Security Council, special adviser to president Lukashenka	Accused of the disappearance of opposition leaders in 1999–2000	
Stepan Sukhorenko	Head of the KGB of Belarus in 2005 - 2007, including during the 2006 Belarusian presidential election		
Dmitri Pavlichenko	Head of the Belarusian Special Rapid Reaction Unit	Accused of involvement into the disappearance of opposition leader Viktar Hanchar in 1999	

==== Judiciary ====
Name	Position	Main accusations	Remarks
Piotr Miklashevich	Member of the Constitutional Court of Belarus	Formal justification of political repressions and electoral fraud	
Aleh Slizheuski	Justice Minister of Belarus	Formal justification of political repressions and electoral fraud	
Viktar Halavanau	Former Minister of Justice	Formal justification of political repressions and electoral fraud	

==== Businesspeople and their immediate relatives ====
Name	Position	Main accusations	Remarks
Nebojša Karić	Key figure in Dana Holdings and its subsidiaries	Close associate of Lukashenko	Serbian/Cypriot national, son of Bogoljub Karić

=== Companies ===
Name	Remarks
Belneftekhim	including Belneftekhim USA Inc.
Polotsk-Steklovolokno	
Grodno Azot	
Lakokraska	
Belarusian Oil Trade House	
Naftan	
Grodno Khimvolokno	
Belshina	

=== Other ===
Name	Remarks
Belarus Olympic Committee	Presided by Viktor Lukashenko

== EU sanctions in 2004 ==
In September 2004, the Council of the European Union adopted sanctions against four Belarusian officials who were accused of involvement in four cases of unsolved disappearances.

Name	Position	Date of birth	Place of birth
Yury Sivakov	Minister of Tourism and Sports of Belarus	5 August 1946	Sakhalin Region
Viktor Sheiman	Prosecutor General of Belarus	26 May 1958	Grodno Region
Dmitry Pavlichenko	Officer of the special forces of Belarus	1966	Vitebsk
Vladimir Naumov	Minister of the Interior of Belarus	1956	

In December the list was expanded to include individuals responsible for conduct of elections and referendum in Belarus on 17 October 2004 and those who are responsible for human rights violations in the handling of demonstrators

Name	Position	Date of birth	Place of birth
Lidia Yermoshina	Chairwoman of the Central Election Commission of Belarus	29 January 1953	Slutsk, Minsk Region
Yuri Podobed	Lieutenant-Colonel of Militia, Unit for Special Purposes (OMON), Ministry of Internal Affairs	5 March 1962	Slutsk, Minsk Region

== EU sanctions list following 2006 presidential elections ==
=== Senior state leadership ===
Name	Position
Alexander Lukashenko	President of Belarus
Gennady Nevyglas	Head of the President's Administration
Natalia Petkevich	Deputy Head of President's administration
Anatoly Rubinov	Deputy Head in charge of media and ideology, PA
Oleg Proleskovsky	Aide and Head of the Main Ideological department, PA
Alexander Radkov	Minister of Education
Vladimir Rusakevich	Minister of Information
Alexander Zimovsky	Member of the Upper House of the Parliament; Head of the national state teleradio company
Vladimir Konoplev	Chairman of the Lower House of the Parliament
Mikalay Charhinets	Chairman of the Foreign Affairs Committee of the Upper House
Syarhei Kastsyan	Chairman of the Foreign Affairs Committee of the Lower House
Mikhail Orda	Member of the Upper House, leader of the BRSM
Leonid Kozik	Head of the Federation of Trade Unions

=== Election organization ===
Name	Position
Lydia Yermoshina	Chairwoman of the Central Election Commission of Belarus
Nikolai Lozovik	Deputy Head of the Central Election Commission of Belarus
Koleda Alexandr Mikhailovich	Chairman of the Elections Commission of the Brest Region
Mikhasev Vladimir Ilyich	Chairman of the CEC of the Gomel Region
Luchina Leonid Aleksandrovich	Chairman of the CEC of the Grodno Region
Ihar Karpenka	Chairman of the CEC of Minsk
Kurlovich Vladimir Anatolievich	Chairman of the CEC of the Minsk Region
Metelitsa Nikolai Timofeevich	Chairman of the CEC of the Mogilev Region
Pishchulenok Mikhail Vasilievich	Chairman of the CEC of the Vitebsk Region

=== State security services ===
Name	Position
Stepan Sukhorenko	Chairman of KGB
Vasily Dementei	First Deputy, KGB
Viktor Sheyman	State Secretary of the Security Council
Dmitry Pavlichenko	Head of the Special Response Group at the Ministry of the Interior (SOBR)
Uladzimir Navumau	Minister of the Interior
Yuri Podobed	Lieutenant-Colonel of Militia, Unit for Special Purposes (OMON), Ministry of Internal Affairs

=== Judiciary ===
Name	Position
Viktar Halavanau	Minister of Justice
Petr Miklashevich	Prosecutor General
Oleg Slizhevsky	Head of the Division of Social organisations, parties and NGOs, Ministry of Justice
Aleksandr Khariton	Consultant of the Division of Social organisations, parties and NGOs of the Ministry of Justice
Evgeny Smirnov	First Deputy of the Chairman of the Economic Court
Nadezhda Reutskaya	Judge of the Moscow district of Minsk
Nikolai Trubnikov	Judge of the Partizanskiy district of Minsk
Nikolai Kupriyanov	Deputy Prosecutor General

On October 23, 2006, the list was expanded with the addition of two more judges and two prosecutors.

On November 10, 2008, the Council of the European Union suspended travel sanctions for all officials except those involved in disappearances and the head of the Central Election Commission, Lidia Yermoshina.

== EU sanctions list following the 2010 Presidential elections ==
The list of sanctioned individuals was consolidated on 25 October 2010. The presidential election was held on 19 December that year.

Following the election and forceful dispersal of protesters, travel sanctions that had been suspended in 2008 were reintroduced on 31 January 2011, covering 157 people in total. The list was gradually expanded, reaching 243 individuals and 32 companies by 26 April 2012.

== EU sanctions list following 23 September 2012 elections ==
This list of sanctioned individuals was published on 15 October 2012, following the 2012 Belarusian parliamentary election.

=== University rectors ===
Name	Position	Reasons for listing	Remarks
Siarhei Ablameika	Rector of the Belarusian State University	Politically motivated expulsions of students	
Tamara Alpeyeva	Rector of International Humanitarian-Economic Institute	Politically motivated expulsions of students	
Mikhail Batura	Rector of Belarusian State University of Informatics and Radioelectronics	Politically motivated expulsions of students	
Mechyslau Chasnouski	Rector of Brest State University	Politically motivated expulsions of students	
Piotr Kukharchyk	Rector of Maxim Tank Belarusian State Pedagogical University	Politically motivated expulsions of students	

=== State propaganda ===
Name	Position	Reasons for listing	Remarks
Liliya Ananich	First Deputy Minister of Information	Promotion of state propaganda	
Dzmitry Zhuk	Director General of the state news agency BelTA		
Alexander Zimovsky	Media adviser and former president of the National State Television and Radio Company of the Republic of Belarus	"The main actor of the regime's propaganda until December 2010"	Also subject to U.S. sanctions
Mikalay Charhinets	Upper House of the Parliament, former Chairman of the Foreign Affairs Committee; Head of the government-loyal Union of writers, Chairman of the Morality Republican Public Council	"A close supporter of President Lukashenka, and key to the regime's propaganda and censorship"	
Gennady Davydko	Head of the National State Television and Radio Company of the Republic of Belarus	"Responsible for promoting state propaganda on TV, propaganda which supported and justified the repression of the democratic opposition and of civil society after the elections in December 2010."	Also subject to U.S. sanctions
Vadim Gigin	Editor-in-Chief of Belaruskaya Dumka, a monthly journal of the President's Administration	"One of the most vocal and influential members of the state propaganda machine in the printed press. He has supported and justified the repression of the democratic opposition and of civil society"	
Pavel Yakubovich	Sovetskaya Belorussiya – Belarus' Segodnya, Editor-in-Chief; Member of the Upper House of the Parliament appointed by President Lukashenka	"One of the most vocal and influential members of the state propaganda machine in the printed press. He has supported and justified the repression of the democratic opposition and of civil society"	
Vsevolod Yanchevski	Presidential Administration of Belarus, Head of the Ideological Department; Assistant to the President	"The main creator of the regime's ideology and state propaganda, which supports and justifies the repression of the democratic opposition and of civil society"	
Yury Koziyatko	Capital TV, TV host, General Director	His TV show "is an instrument of state propaganda which supports and justifies the repression of the democratic opposition and of civil society"	
Aliaksei Mikhalchanka	ONT, TV host, influential journalist	His "programme is an instrument of state propaganda on TV, which supports and justifies the repression of the democratic opposition and of civil society"	Managed to get sanctions against him lifted in 2014, following procedural flaws of EU's prolongation of sanctions in 2012
Yuri Prokopov	Belarus-1, TV host, journalist	His TV show "is an instrument of state propaganda on TV, which supports and justifies the repression of the democratic opposition and of civil society"	
Oleg Proleskovsky	Minister of Information, Presidential Administration, former Deputy Head, former Head of General Directorate for Ideology and Centre of Analysis and Information	"One of the main sources and voices of state propaganda and ideological support for the regime"	
Anatoli Rubinov	Upper House of the Parliament, chairman; Presidential Administration, Former Deputy Head in charge of Media and Ideology (in 2006–2008)	"One of the main sources and voices of state propaganda and ideological support for the regime"	
Aleksandr Bazanov	Information and Analytical Centre of the Presidential Administration, Director	"He is one of the main sources of state propaganda, which supports and justifies the repression of the democratic opposition and of civil society."	
Siarhei Gardzienka	Sovetskaya Belorussiya – Belarus' Segodnya, Deputy Editor-in-Chief	"Responsible for relaying state propaganda in the printed press, which has supported and justified the repression of the democratic opposition and of civil society, systematically highlighted in a negative and derogatory way using falsified and untrue information"	
Aleksei Gusev	Information and Analytical Centre of the President's Administration, Former first Deputy Director	"A source and voice of state propaganda, which provokes, supports and justifies the repression of the democratic opposition and of civil society"	
Alena Kolas	Information and Analytical Centre of the Presidential Administration, Deputy Director		
Lev Krishtapovich	Information and Analytical Centre of the Presidential Administration, Deputy Director		
Igor Laptionok	Former Deputy Minister of Information	He "played a major role in promoting state propaganda which supports and justifies the repression of the democratic opposition and of civil society"	
Anatol Lemiashonak	Respublika, Editor-in-Chief	"In his position he is one of the most vocal and influential members of the state propaganda machine in the printed press"	
Mikhail Lebedik	Sovetskaya Belorussiya – Belarus' Segodnya, First deputy Editor-in-Chief	His newspaper is a "source of pro-governmental policy, falsifying facts and making unfair comments on the ongoing processes in Belarus against the democratic opposition and civil society"	
Hanna Shadryna	Sovetskaya Belorussiya – Belarus' Segodnya, Former Deputy Editor-in-Chief		
Aleksandr Taranda	Sovetskaya Belorussiya – Belarus' Segodnya, Editor-in-Chief		
Halina Tarapetskaya	Sovetskaya Belorussiya – Belarus' Segodnya, Deputy Editor-in-Chief		

=== Businesspeople ===
Name	Position	Reasons for listing	Remarks
Yury Chyzh	Owner of Triple LLC	Financial support to the Lukashenka regime	
Vladimir Peftiev	Owner of diverse assets in Belarus and abroad	Economic advice to President Lukashenka, "key financial sponsor" of the Lukashenka regime	October 2014, the sanctions were dropped by the EU Council. On 9 December 2014, the General Court of European Union decided in Peftiev's and his companies' favour, annulling the sanctions and ruling that the Council of the European Union and European Commission had made mistakes while evaluating Peftiev's business activities.
Dmitry Lukashenko	Businessman, son of president Alexander Lukashenko		

=== Judges and state prosecution ===
Name	Position	Reasons for listing	Remarks
Akulich, Sviatlana	Judge of the Pukhavichy District Court	Politically motivated administrative and criminal sanctions against representatives of civil society	
Aliaksandrau, Dzmitry	Judge of the Supreme Economic Court	He sustained the ban of the independent radio station Autoradio	
Ananich, Alena	Judge at the Pyershamayski District Court of the city of Minsk	Sentencing protests participants in violation of the legislation	
Arkhipov, Aleksandr	Prosecutor of the Minsk Region	Repression of civil society	
Bodak, Alla	Deputy Minister of Justice	Responsible for the role and the action of the Ministry of Justice and the judiciary of Belarus, which are major instruments of repression of the population	
Bolovnev, Nikolai	Judge at the Zavodski District Court of the city of Minsk	Judicial repression of the peaceful demonstrators on 19 December 2010	
Bondarenko, Sergei	Judge of the Pyershamayski District Court of Minsk	Judicial repressions. On 24 November 2011, he sentenced Ales Byalyatski, one of the most prominent human rights defenders	
Baranouski, Andrei	Judge at the Partyzanski District Court of the city of Minsk	Judicial repression of the peaceful demonstrators on 19 December 2010	

=== State security services ===
Name	Position	Accusations	Remarks
Aleinikov Sergei Aleksandrovich	Major, head of operative unit of penal colony No. 17 in Shklov	Exerted pressure on political prisoners by denying their right to correspondence and meetings, issued orders to subject them to a stricter criminal regime, searches, and made threats in order to extort confessions. He was directly responsible for violating the human rights of political prisoners and opposition activists by using excessive force against them. His actions constituted a direct violation of the international commitments of Belarus in the field of human rights	
Orlov, Alexandr Vladimirovich	Colonel, head of the KGB detention centre in Minsk	He was personally responsible for cruel, inhuman and degrading treatment or punishment of those who were detained in the weeks and months after the crackdown on the post-election protest demonstration in Minsk on 19 December 2010. His actions constituted a direct violation of the international commitments of Belarus in the field of human rights.	
Atabekov, Khazalbek Bakhtibekovich	Colonel, commander of a special brigade of Interior Troops in the Uruchie suburb of Minsk.	He commanded his unit during the crackdown on the post-election protest demonstration in Minsk on 19 December 2010 where an excessive use of force was applied. His actions constituted a direct violation of the international commitments of Belarus in the field of human rights.	
Bakhmatov, Igor Andreevich	former Deputy Head of the KGB	Active involvement in the repression of civil society in Belarus. As a former Deputy Head of the KGB, in charge of the staff and the organisation of their tasks, Bakhmatov was responsible for the repressive work of the KGB against civil society and democratic opposition	
Barsukov, Aleksandr Petrovich	Colonel, Chief of Minsk police.	Since his appointment as Chief of Minsk police on 21 October 2011, he has been responsible, as commander, for the repression of approximately a dozen peaceful protesters in Minsk, who were later convicted for breaking the law on mass events. For several years he commanded police action against street protests of the opposition.	
Busko, Igor Yevgenyevich	Head of the KGB of the Brest Region	Responsible for the repressive work of the KGB against civil society and democratic opposition in the region of Brest, Belarus.	
Chernyshev, Oleg Anatolievich	Colonel, in charge of counter-terrorist unit of the KGB, the Alpha unit.	He personally participated in tortures of opposition activists in the KGB detention centre in Minsk after the crackdown on the post-election protest demonstration in Minsk 19 December 2010	
Dementey, Vasili Ivanovich	Head of the Hrodna Customs regional committee, former First deputy Chairman of the KGB (2005–2007), former Deputy Head of the State Customs Committee.	Responsible for repressions against civil society and the democratic opposition, in particular in 2006–2007	
Dedkov, Leonid Nikolaevich	Deputy Head of the KGB	Shares responsibility for the repressive work of the KGB against civil society and democratic opposition.	
Farmagey, Leonid Konstantinovich	Deputy Head of the academy of the Ministry of Interior. Before June 2011 – Police Commander of the City of Minsk	Has been actively involved in the repression of civil society in Belarus. In his former role (until June 2011) as, he commanded the Minsk militia forces that brutally repressed a demonstration on 19 December 2010.	
Gaidukevich Valeri Vladimirovich	Deputy Minister of Interior. Commander of internal troops, and Member of Parliament in the Lower Chamber	As a commander of internal troops, he was responsible for the violent repression of the demonstration on 19 December 2010 in Minsk, where his troops were the first to be actively involved.	
Gerasimenko, Gennadi Anatolievich	Deputy Head of the Institute of National Security (KGB school) and former Head of the KGB of the Vitebsk Region	Responsible for the repressive work of the KGB against civil society and democratic opposition in the region of Vitebsk.	
Gureev Sergei Viktorovich,	Former Deputy Minister of Interior and Head of Preliminary Investigation	Has been actively involved in the repression of civil society in Belarus. As a former Deputy Minister of Interior and Head of Preliminary Investigation, he was responsible for the violent suppression of protests and violations of human rights during investigation proceedings in relation to the December 2010 elections. Joined the reserve forces in February 2012	
Yaruta, Viktor Gueorguevich	Head of the KGB Board on State Communications	Responsible for the repressive work of the KGB against civil society and democratic opposition.	
Yevseyev, Igor Vladimirovich	Head of the regional Vitebsk police. Former Deputy Head of Minsk Police and Head of the Minsk anti-riot (OMON) operation team.	He commanded the troops that put down the peaceful demonstrations on 19 December 2010 and personally took part in the brutality, for which he received an award and an acknowledgement letter from President Lukashenko in February 2011. In 2011, he also commanded the troops that repressed several other protests by political activists and citizens in Minsk	
Ivanov, Sergey	Deputy Head of Supply Division of the Ideological and Personnel Directorate of the Minsk Municipal Department of Interior	In February 2011, he received an award and an acknowledgement letter from President Lukashenko for his active participation and implementation of orders during the repression of the 19 December 2010 demonstrations	
Kadin, Roman	Commanding officer of Weaponry and Technical Supply of the Motorised Patrol Service	In February 2011, he received an award and an acknowledgement letter from President Lukashenka for his active participation and implementation of orders during the repression of the 19 December 2010 demonstrations	
Kalach, Vladimir Viktorovich	Head of the KGB of the Minsk Region and city of Minsk and former Deputy Head of the KGB for Minsk	Responsible for the repressive work of the KGB civil society and the democratic opposition in Minsk	
Kovalev, Aleksandr Mikhailovich	Director of the prison camp in Gorki	He was responsible for the inhuman treatment of the detainees, especially for persecution and torturous treatment of civil society activist Dzmitry Dashkevich, who was imprisoned in relation to the 19 December 2010 elections and the crackdown on civil society and on the democratic opposition	
Korzh, Ivan Alekseevich	Head of the KGB of the Hrodna Region	Responsible for the repressive work of the KGB against civil society and democratic opposition in the region of Hrodna	
Krashevski, Viktor	Head of the GRU.	Responsible for the work of the intelligence services in the repression of civil society and of the democratic opposition.	
Anatoly Kuleshov	Former Minister of Interior	Has been actively involved in the repression of civil society in Belarus. In his former role as Minister of Interior he commanded the troops of the Ministry of Interior that brutally repressed the peaceful demonstrations on 19 December 2010 and showed some pride for this responsibility. Assigned to the army reserve forces in January 2012.	
Kuznetsov, Igor Nikonovich	Head of KGB Training Centre, former Head of the KGB in the Minsk Region and in Minsk city.	As the person responsible for preparing and training KGB staff, he was responsible for the repressive work of the KGB against civil society and the democratic opposition. In relation to his previous functions, he was responsible for the same repressive work of the KGB in Minsk city and in the region of Minsk.	
Leskovski, Ivan Anatolievich	Head of the KGB for Homel and former Deputy Head of the KGB for Homel	Responsible for the repressive work of the KGB against civil society and democratic opposition in the region of Homel	
Lukomski, Aleksandr Valentinovich	Commander of the Special Regiment of the Ministry of Interior of the City of Minsk	He commanded the troops that repressed a peaceful demonstration on 19 December 2010, for which he received an award and an acknowledgement letter from President Lukashenko in February 2011. In June 2011, he also commanded troops that repressed peaceful citizens in Minsk	
Maltsev, Leonid Semenovich	Secretary of the Security Council	Responsible for all state security services. He planned and ordered the repression of peaceful demonstrations on 19 December 2010.	
Maslakov, Valeri Anatolievich	Head of the KGB Board of Intelligence	Responsible for the repressive work of the KGB against civil society and the democratic opposition	
Naumov, Vladimir Vladimirovich	Former Minister of Interior and also former Head of the President's Security Service.	Failed to take action to investigate the case of the unresolved disappearances of Yury Zacharanka, Viktar Hanchar, Anatoly Krasovski and Dzmitry Zavadski in Belarus in 1999–2000	Remained on the sanctions list after 2016
Yuri Podobed	Head of the security service of the holding company Triple of Yury Chyzh, former Head of the Unit for Special Purposes, Ministry of Interior	As a commander of internal anti-riot troops he was directly responsible for and was directly involved in the violent repression of peaceful demonstrations, notably in 2004 and 2008	
Pavlichenko, Dmitry Valerievich	Former Head of the Special Response Group at the Ministry of Interior (SOBR).	Key person in the unresolved disappearances of opposition leaders Yury Zacharanka, Viktar Hanchar, opposition sponsor Anatoly Krasovski, and journalist Dzmitry Zavadski in Belarus in 1999–2000	Remained on the sanctions list after 2016
Pekarski, Oleg Anatolievich	former first Deputy Minister of Interior	Has been actively involved in the repression of civil society in Belarus. Responsible for the repression of civil society following the December 2010 elections	
Poluden, Yevgeni Yevgenyevich	Former Deputy Minister of Interior and Head of the militia (police)	Under his command, militia forces brutally repressed the peaceful demonstrations on 19 December 2010.	
Sanko, Ivan Ivanovich	Major, senior investigator of the KGB	He conducted investigations which included the use of falsified evidence against opposition activists in the KGB detention centre in Minsk after the crackdown on the post-election protest demonstration in Minsk on December 19, 2010. His actions constituted a clear violation of the human rights by denying the right to a fair trial and the international commitments of Belarus in the field of human rights	
Shamyonov, Vadim Igorevich	Captain, head of operative unit of penal colony No. 17 in Shklov	Exerted pressure on political prisoners, denying their right to correspondence, and made threats in order to extort confessions. Directly responsible for violating the human rights of political prisoners and opposition activists by the use of cruel, inhuman and degrading treatment or punishment. His actions constituted a direct violation of the international commitments of Belarus in the field of human rights	
Shugaev, Sergei Mikhailovich	Head of the KGB Counter-Intelligence Division and former Deputy Head of the KGB Counter-Intelligence Board	Responsible for the repressive work of the KGB against civil society and the democratic opposition	
Igor Sergeenko	Head of the KGB of the City District of Mahiliou	Responsible for the repressive work of the KGB against civil society and democratic opposition in the region of Mahiliou.	
Sivakov, Yury Leonidovich	Former Minister of Interior and former Deputy Head of the Presidential Administration	Orchestrated the unresolved disappearances of Yury Zacharanka, Viktar Hanchar, Anatoly Krasovski and Dzmitry Zavadski in Belarus in 1999–2000. Deputy rector of Minsk Institute of Management, former Minister of Tourism and Sports, former Minister of Interior and former Deputy Head of the Presidential Administration.	Remained on the sanctions list after 2016
Smolenski, Nikolai Zinovievich	Deputy Head of CIS Anti-terrorism Centre and former Deputy Head of the KGB, in charge of staff and the organisation of their tasks	Responsible for the repressive work of the KGB against civil society and democratic opposition	
Sukhorenko, Stepan Nikolaevich	Ambassador of the Belarusian Ministry of Foreign Affairs, former chairman of the KGB	He threatened peaceful activists before demonstrations in 2006, and was one of the main actors in the repression after the fraudulent elections of the democratic opposition and of civil society. He was also the initiator of repressive legislative amendments and laws against the democratic opposition and civil society	
Sukhov, Dmitri Vyacheslavovich	Lieutenant-Colonel, operative of the military counter-intelligence of the KGB	He falsified evidence and used threats and excessive force in order to extort confessions from opposition activists in the KGB detention centre in Minsk after the crackdown on the post-election protest demonstration in Minsk on 19 December 2010	
Svorob, Nikolai Konstantinovich	Former Deputy Head of the KGB	He has been actively involved in the repression of civil society in Belarus. He was responsible for the repressive work of the KGB against civil society and democratic opposition	
Tolstashov, Aleksandr Olegovich	Head of the KGB Board on Protection of the Constitutional Order and Fight Against Terrorism	Responsible for the repressive work of the KGB against civil society and democratic opposition	
Tretiak, Petr Vladimirovich	Former Deputy Head of the KGB and Member of the Commission of the Security Council on radio frequencies	He has been actively involved in the repression of civil society in Belarus. He was responsible for the repressive work of the KGB against civil society and democratic opposition	
Traulko, Pavel	Lieutenant Colonel, former operative of the military counter-intelligence of the KGB, then head of the press service of the newly formed Investigative Committee of Belarus	He falsified evidence and used threats in order to extort confessions from opposition activists in the KGB detention centre in Minsk after the crackdown on the post-election protest demonstration in Minsk on 19 December 2010. He was directly responsible for the use of cruel, inhuman and degrading treatment or punishment and for denying the right to a fair trial. His actions constituted a direct violation of the international commitments of Belarus in the field of human rights.	
Tertel, Ivan Stanislavovich	Deputy Head of the KGB, in charge of economic crime and the fight against corruption	Responsible for the repressive work of the KGB against civil society and the democratic opposition.	
Vtiurin, Andrei Aleksandrovich	Head of the Presidential Security Service	Under his supervision, several members of his service took part in interrogations of political activists after the demonstrations on 19 December 2010	
Voropaev, Igor Grigorievich	Deputy General Manager for Scientific work of the company "Research Institute on Electronic Computers" under the control of the State military-industrial committee; former Head of the KGB Board on State Communications	Responsible for the repressive work of the KGB against civil society and democratic opposition	
Vegera, Viktor Pavlovich	First Deputy Head of the KGB	Responsible for the repressive work of the KGB against civil society and democratic opposition. He was the initiator of the case of the political prisoner Ales Byaliatski, one of the most prominent human rights defenders, Chief of the Belarusian Human Rights Centre Vyasna, Vice President of FIDH. A. Byalyatski was active in defending and providing assistance to those who suffered from repression in relation to the 19 December 2010 elections and the crackdown on civil society and on the democratic opposition.	
Volkov, Sergei Mikhailovich	Former Head of the KGB Board of Intelligence	Has been actively involved in the repression of civil society in Belarus. Responsible for the repressive work of the KGB against civil society and democratic opposition.	
Yermolitski, Sergei Vladimirovich	Director of the prison camp in Shklov	He was responsible for the inhuman treatment of the detainees and persecution of former presidential candidate Nikolai Statkevich, who was imprisoned in relation to the 19 December 2010 events, and other inmates.	
Zaitsev, Vadim Iurievich	Head of the KGB	Responsible for transforming the KGB into the main organ of repression of civil society and of the democratic opposition. Responsible for the dissemination, through the media, of false information about the demonstrators on 19 December 2010, alleging that they had brought materials to be used as weapons. He personally threatened the lives and health of the wife and child of former presidential candidate, Andrei Sannikov. He is the main initiator of orders for unlawful harassment of democratic opposition, the torture of political opponents and the mistreatment of prisoners.	
Zakharov, Alexey Ivanovich	Former Head of Military Counter-intelligence Board of the KGB	Has been actively involved in the repression of civil society in Belarus. He was responsible for the repressive work of the KGB against civil society and the democratic opposition. Under his supervision, KGB staff took part in interrogations of political activists following the demonstration on 19 December 2010.	

== Remaining EU sanctions list after 2016 ==
Name	Position	Accusations	Remarks
Uladzimir Navumau	Former Minister of Interior and also former Head of the President's Security Service	Failed to take action to investigate the case of the unresolved disappearances of Yury Zacharanka, Viktar Hanchar, Anatoly Krasovski and Dzmitry Zavadski in Belarus in 1999–2000. As a Minister of Interior he was responsible for the repression of peaceful demonstrations until his retirement on 6 April 2009 for health reasons	
Dmitri Pavlichenko	Head of the Belarusian Special Rapid Reaction Unit	Key person in the unresolved disappearances of Yury Zacharanka, Viktar Hanchar, Anatoly Krasovski and Dzmitry Zavadski in Belarus in 1999–2000	
Viktor Sheiman	Head of the Management Department of the Presidential Administration	Responsible for the unresolved disappearances of Yury Zacharanka, Viktar Hanchar, Anatoly Krasovski and Dzmitry Zavadski in Belarus in 1999–2000	
Yury Sivakov	Former Minister of Interior and former Deputy Head of the Administration of the President of Belarus	Orchestrated the unresolved disappearances of Yury Zacharanka, Viktar Hanchar, Anatoly Krasovski and Dzmitry Zavadski in Belarus in 1999–2000.	

== Sanctions after the disputed 2020 presidential election ==
After the disputed Belarusian presidential elections of 2020, several western countries announced sanctions against Belarusian officials. Latvia has been the first country to do so on 31 August, joined soon by Lithuania and Estonia. The list included President Lukashenko and all Central Election Committee members as well as other senior state official and security forces commanders.

The Baltic states were later followed by Canada, the United Kingdom, the United States, the European Union, Switzerland and New Zealand. These countries have sanctioned various numbers of Belarusian officials "for their roles in the fraudulent August 9, 2020 Belarus presidential election or the subsequent violent crackdown on peaceful protesters" or under similar motivations.

More sanctions against Belarusian individuals and entities followed after the Russian invasion of Ukraine; some of them were introduced due to Belarus's role in it. The European Union, Switzerland, the United Kingdom, the United States and Canada expanded their existing sanction packages, while Australia, Japan, New Zealand and Ukraine introduced their sanctions. Some of the invasion-related sanctions against Belarusian individuals and entities are listed in the 'Russian' sanctions lists of these countries.

=== Timeline of the post-election sanctions ===
==== 2020 ====
- On 14 August, EU High Representative for Foreign Affairs and Security Policy Josep Borrell announced that the EU would bring in sanctions against Belarusian officials responsible for "violence and falsification". Charles Michel, President of the European Council went further on 19 August saying the EU would soon impose sanctions on a "substantial number" of individuals responsible for violence, repression, and election fraud. The European Commission announced it would divert €53 million earmarked for Belarus away from the government and towards civil society, victims of the state crackdown on protesters and the country's fight against the coronavirus pandemic.
- On 18 August, the Lithuanian parliament agreed to impose economic sanctions.
- On 19 August, the prime minister of Slovakia stated that the Government of Slovakia introduced sanctions against Belarus in the new legislative session.
- On 31 August, Estonia, Latvia and Lithuania imposed sanctions on 30 Belarusian officials, including Alexander Lukashenko.
- On 10 September, the EU sanctions on Belarus were delayed by a separate dispute between Cyprus and Turkey, which has occupied the northern part of Cyprus since July 1974. Greece and Cyprus were pushing for a sanction on Turkey in a dispute in the Eastern Mediterranean.
- On 25 September, Estonia, Latvia and Lithuania imposed sanctions on around a hundred Belarus officials.
- On 29 September, personal sanctions against members of the regime, including Alexander and Viktor Lukashenko, were imposed by the UK and Canada. 8 and 11 individuals were affected, respectively. The sanctions included travel bans and asset freezes.
- On 2 October, the EU imposed sanctions on 40 Belarusian officials. Lukashenko was exempted from the sanctions as the EU aims to encourage Lukashenko to engage in talks with the opposition. Hours later, Belarus retaliated with sanctions against EU officials. On the same day, the US imposed sanctions on 8 Belarusian individuals.
- On 13 October, Switzerland joined the EU sanctions against 40 Belarusian individuals.
- On 15 October, Canada imposed sanctions on 31 additional Belarusian individuals.
- On 6 November, the EU imposed sanctions on Alexander Lukashenko and 14 other officials for repression of the pro-democracy movement following August's contested election. Their assets in EU member states were frozen and they are banned from entering EU territory. On the same day, Canada imposed sanctions on 13 Belarusian individuals.
- On 19 November, the EU announced an upcoming list of sanctions targeting the country's firms and entrepreneurs that finance Lukashenko. According to Borrell, up to date no positive signs were seen from the regime and the new measures will increase economic pressure on the self-proclaimed president.
- On 20 November, Iceland, Liechtenstein, Norway, North Macedonia, Montenegro, Albania and Ukraine aligned themselves with the October EU sanctions against 40 Belarusian individuals. Separately on the same day, Estonia, Latvia and Lithuania imposed sanctions on 28 Belarusian individuals.
- On 24 November, Iceland, Liechtenstein, Norway, North Macedonia, Montenegro and Albania aligned themselves with the November EU sanctions against 15 Belarusian individuals.
- On 11 December, Switzerland joined the November EU sanctions against 15 Belarusian individuals.
- On 17 December, the EU imposed a third round of economic sanctions on dozens of Belarusian individuals and entities. They include restrictive measures imposed on the head of Belarusian state television, Ivan Eismont, Deputy Prime Minister Anatol Sivak, Information Minister Ihar Lutsky, and 26 other individuals. The sanctions package also included asset freezes on seven Belarusian companies, including arms exporter CJSC Beltechexport.
- On 23 December, the US imposed sanctions on one Belarusian individual and four entities, including Central Election Commission of Belarus.

==== 2021 to early 2022 ====
- On 26 January 2021, Iceland, Liechtenstein, Norway, North Macedonia, Montenegro and Albania aligned themselves with the December EU sanctions against Belarusian individuals and entities.
- On 18 February, the UK imposed sanctions on 27 additional individuals.
- On 22 March, Switzerland imposed sanctions on 29 Belarusian individuals and seven entities.
- On 24 March, Iceland, Liechtenstein, Norway, North Macedonia, Montenegro and Albania aligned themselves with the February EU decision to prolong the restrictive measures concerning Belarus.
- On 25 March, Estonia, Latvia and Lithuania put another 118 Belarusian individuals on their sanctions lists.
- On 17 June, New Zealand introduced travel bans against more than fifty individuals associated with the Lukashenko regime, including himself and key members of his administration, the electoral commission, the police and other security forces.
- On 21 June, following the forced diversion of Ryanair Flight 4978, several countries added some Belarusian individuals and entities to their sanctions lists. Namely, the EU imposed a fourth round of restrictive measures against 78 Belarusian individuals (including prominent government officials and business figures) and seven entities, with among others, BelAZ and MAZ automobile plants; the UK imposed sanctions against 11 individuals and 2 entities; the US imposed sanctions on 16 Belarusian individuals and five entities, namely, Okrestina detention centre, Internal Troops of Belarus, GUBOPiK, KGB, Investigative Committee of Belarus; Canada imposed sanctions on 17 Belarusian individuals and five entities.
- On June 24, the EU also imposed sanctions on Belarusian economy.
- On 6 July, Iceland, Liechtenstein, Norway, North Macedonia, Montenegro and Albania aligned themselves with the 21 June EU sanctions against Belarusian individuals and entities.
- On 7 July, Switzerland imposed sanctions on 78 individuals and seven organizations from Belarus.
- On 12–13 July, Norway, Iceland, North Macedonia, Montenegro and Albania aligned themselves with the EU sanctions against Belarusian economy.
- On 21 July, the UK imposed sanctions on the Agat Electromechanical Plant.
- On 9 August (anniversary of the 2020 election), several countries added some Belarus-related individuals and entities to their sanctions lists. Namely, the UK announced aviation restrictions, trade and financial measures, and designated businessman Mikhail Gutseriyev; the US sanctioned 23 individuals (government officials, kickboxer Dmitry Shakuta, directors of several state-owned enterprises, businessmen such as Mikalai Varabei and Aliaksei Aleksin, and high-ranking members of law enforcement) and 21 entities (Belaruskali, Grodno tobacco factory, and Belarus Olympic Committee, among others) contributing to the situation in Belarus; Canada imposed trade and financial restrictions.
- On 11 August, Switzerland joined the June EU economic sanctions.
- On 2 December, after the start of the border crisis, several countries expanded their Belarus-related sanctions lists. Namely, the EU imposed a fifth round of restrictive measures against 17 individuals, targeting judges and top Belarusian officials, and 11 companies (Belavia, among others); the UK imposed sanctions against 8 Belarusian individuals and Belaruskali; the US designated 20 Belarusian individuals (Alexander Lukashenko's middle son Dmitry, GUBOPiK and State Border Committee officials, Belarusian sports official and politician Dzmitry Baskau, and Dmitriy Korzyuk, the deputy Minister of internal affairs) and 12 entities, identified three aircraft as blocked property and imposed sovereign debt restrictions on Belarus; Canada blacklisted 24 individuals and 6 entities of Belarus.
- On 10 December, the United States Department of State designated two heads of Akrestsina Detention Center; both had already been designated by the Office of Foreign Assets Control of the United States Department of the Treasury.
- On 20 December, Switzerland imposed sanctions against 17 individuals and 11 companies related to Belarus. The new Swiss sanctions are identical to the 2 December EU designations.
- On 22 December, Iceland, Liechtenstein, Norway, North Macedonia, Montenegro, Serbia and Albania aligned themselves with the 2 December EU sanctions against Belarusian individuals and entities.
- On 3 February 2022, the United States imposed visa restrictions on Belarusian nationals involved in extraterritorial counter-dissident activity, including the Summer Olympics incident with Krystsina Tsimanouskaya, under the Khashoggi Ban.

=== Alexander Lukashenko and his family ===
Name	Remarks	(Latvia)	(Estonia)	(Lithuania)	(European Union)	(United Kingdom)	(Canada)	(United States)	(Norway)	(Switzerland)	(Japan)	(Australia)	(New Zealand)	(Ukraine)
Alexander Lukashenko	President of Belarus							(Note: This person has already been added to the respective sanctions list since before the 2020 election.)						
Viktor Lukashenko	The eldest son of Alexander Lukashenko. National security advisor, member of the Security Council of Belarus, President of the Belarus Olympic Committee.													
Liliya Lukashenka	Wife of Viktar Lukashenka and daughter-in-law of Aliaksandr Lukashenka. According to the EU, "she has been closely connected with a number of high-profile companies, which have benefitted from the Lukashenka regime, including Dana Holdings / Dana Astra, Belkhudozhpromysly concern and Eastleigh trading Ltd. She was present, alongside her husband Viktar Lukashenka, on Aliaksandr Lukashenka's secret inauguration in September 2020. She is therefore benefiting from and supporting the Lukashenka regime"													
Dmitry Lukashenko	Son of Aliaksandr Lukashenka, businessman.													
Nikolai Lukashenko	The youngest son of Aliaksandr Lukashenka.													
Galina Lukashenko	Wife of Aliaksandr Lukashenka.													

=== Presidential Administration ===
Name	Remarks	(Latvia)	(Estonia)	(Lithuania)	(European Union)	(United Kingdom)	(Canada)	(United States)	(Norway)	(Switzerland)
Igor Sergeenko	Then-Head of the Presidential Administration (before 2024)									
Maxim Ryzhenkov	Then-First Deputy Head of the Presidential Administration									
Andrei Kuntsevich	Deputy Head of the Presidential Administration of the Republic of Belarus									
Olga Chupris	Deputy Head of the Presidential Administration of Belarus									
Dmitry Krutoi	Deputy Head of the Presidential Administration of Belarus									
Igor Lutski	Deputy Head of the Presidential Administration, earlier Minister of Information of the Republic of Belarus (2020–2021)									
Natalia Petkevich	Deputy Head of the Presidential Administration of Belarus (2004–2009), First First Deputy Head of the Administration (2009–2010)									
Valery Ivanov	Head of the Management Department of the Presidential Administration (2021–2022)									
Viktor Sheiman	Head of the Management Department of the Presidential Administration (before 2021), later Special Assistant/Aide to the President									
Gennadiy Bogdan	Deputy Head of the Management Department of the Presidential Administration									

=== Security Council of Belarus ===
Name	Remarks	(Latvia)	(Estonia)	(Lithuania)	(European Union)	(United Kingdom)	(Canada)	(United States)	(Norway)	(Switzerland)	(Japan)	(Australia)	(New Zealand)	(Ukraine)
Alexander Volfovich	State Secretary of Security Council of Belarus (since 2021), earlier Chief of the General Staff of the Armed Forces of Belarus (2020–2021)													
Andrei Ravkov	Belarus Ambassador to Azerbaijan, former Secretary of State of the Security Council of Belarus (2020), earlier Minister of Defence													
Aleksandr Rakhmanov	Deputy Secretary of State of the Security Council of Belarus													

=== Members of Elections Commissions ===
Name	Remarks	(Latvia)	(Estonia)	(Lithuania)	(European Union)	(United Kingdom)	(Canada)	(United States)	(Norway)	(Switzerland)
Ihar Karpenka	Chairman of the Central Electoral Commission since 2021, former Minister of Education (2016–2021)									
Lidia Yermoshina	Chairwoman of the Central Electoral Commission (1996–2021)									
Vadim Ipatov	Deputy Chairman of the Central Electoral Commission									
Elena Dmukhailo	Secretary of the Central Electoral Commission									
Aleksandr Losyakin	Member of the Central Electoral Commission									
Olga Doroshenko	Member of the Central Electoral Commission									
Andrey Gurzhiy	Member of the Central Electoral Commission									
Sergey Kalinovski	Member of the Central Electoral Commission									
Svetlana Katsubo	Secretary of the Central Electoral Commission									
Igor Plyshevski	Member of the Central Electoral Commission, Head of the Main Department of Justice of the Minsk City Executive Committee									
Oleg Slizhevski	Member of the Central Electoral Commission, Minister of Justice (2011–2021)									
Irina Tselikovets	Member of the Central Electoral Commission									
Marina Rakhmanova	Member of the Central Electoral Commission									
Dzyanis Duk	Member of the Central Electoral Commission and Mogilev State A. Kuleshov University rector									
Alena Baldouskaya	Member of the Central Electoral Commission									
Yekaterina Fedosenko	Member of the Central Electoral Commission									
Alena Kuntsevich	Member of the Central Electoral Commission									
Alyaksandr Tkachou	Member of the Central Electoral Commission									
Alyaksandr Yuzhyk	Member of the Central Electoral Commission									

=== Judges ===
==== Constitutional Court of Belarus ====
Name	Remarks	(Latvia)	(Estonia)	(Lithuania)	(European Union)	(United Kingdom)	(Canada)	(United States)	(Norway)	(Switzerland)
Pyotr Miklashevich	Chairman of the Constitutional Court of Belarus									
Natalia Karpovich	Deputy Chairwoman of the Constitutional Court of Belarus									
Olga Sergeeva	Judge of the Constitutional Court of Belarus									
Tadeush Voronovich	Judge of the Constitutional Court of Belarus									
Tatyana Boiko	Judge of the Constitutional Court of Belarus									
Alla Bodak	Judge of the Constitutional Court of Belarus									
Anatoly Tikovenko	Judge of the Constitutional Court of Belarus									
Liliya Kozyreva	Judge of the Constitutional Court of Belarus.									
Stanislav Danilyuk	Judge of the Constitutional Court of Belarus									

==== Supreme Court of Belarus ====
Name	Remarks	(Latvia)	(Estonia)	(Lithuania)	(European Union)	(United Kingdom)	(Canada)	(United States)	(Norway)	(Switzerland)
Valentin Sukalo	Chairman of the Supreme Court of Belarus									
Valeriy Kalinkovich	First Deputy Chairman of the Supreme Court									
Andrei Zabara	Deputy Chairman, Chairman of the Judicial Collegium for Civil Cases of the Supreme Court of the Republic of Belarus									
Zhanna Shkurdiuk	Deputy Chairwoman of the Supreme Court									
Yury Kobets	Deputy Chairman of the Supreme Court									
Valiantsina Kulik	Judge of the Supreme Court									
Ihar Liubavitski	Judge of the Supreme Court									
Hanna Sakalouskaya	Judge of the Supreme Court									
Vladimir Davydov	Judge of the Supreme Court									
Svetlana Bondarenko	Judge of the Supreme Court since 2023, earlier judge at Maskowski District in Minsk (before 2021) and judge at the Minsk Regional Court (2021–2023)									

==== Lower courts ====
Name	Remarks	(Latvia)	(Estonia)	(Lithuania)	(European Union)	(United Kingdom)	(Canada)	(United States)	(Norway)	(Switzerland)
Petr Orlov	Judge at the Minsk City Court									
Valentina Zenkevich	Judge at the Minsk City Court									
Sergey Khripach	Judge at the Minsk City Court									
Alena Ananich	Judge at the Minsk City Court									
Nina Shestak	Judge at the Brest Regional Court									
Vera Filonik	Judge at the Brest Regional Court									
Evgeni Bregan	Judge at the Brest Regional Court									
Siarhei Yepikhau (Sergei Yepikhov)	Judge at the Minsk Regional Court									
Vyacheslav Tuleyko	Judge at the Minsk Regional Court									
Irina Maiko	Judge at the Minsk Regional Court									
Nikolai Dolya	Judge at the Gomel Regional Court									
Oleg Khoroshko	Judge at the Gomel Regional Court									
Anatoliy Sotnikov	Judge at the Gomel Regional Court									
Alexey Khlyshchenkov	Judge at the Gomel Regional Court									
Vasili Begun	Judge at the Gomel Regional Court									
Dmitriy Bubenchik	Judge at the Grodno Regional Court									
Vasily Skok	Judge at the Grodno Regional Court									
Igor Shvedov	Judge at the Mogilev Regional Court									
Igor Zemtsov	Judge at the Mogilev Regional Court									
Aliaksandr Abashyn	Judge at the Vitebsk Regional Court									
Aleksandr Petrash	Chairman of the Maskowski District Court, Minsk									
Yuliya Blizniuk	Deputy Chairwoman of the Frunzyenski District Court, Minsk									
Aliaksandr Rudzenka (Aleksandr Rudenko)	Deputy Chairman of the Kastrychnitski District Court, Minsk									
Marina Zapasnik	Deputy Chairwoman of the Leninsky District Court, Minsk									
Aleksandr Yakunchihin	Deputy Chairman of the Savyetski District Court, Minsk									
Svetlana Vorotynskaya	Deputy Chairwoman of the Chyhunachny District Court, Vitsebsk									
Natalia Buguk	Judge, Frunzyenski District, Minsk									
Mariya Yerokhina	Judge, Frunzyenski District, Minsk									
Andrei Mlechko	Judge, Frunzyenski District, Minsk									
Alena (Elena) Zhyvitsa	Judge, Kastrychnitski District, Minsk									
Olga Neborskaya	Judge, Kastrychnitski District, Minsk									
Tatsiana Matyl (Tatiana Motyl)	Judge, Maskowski District, Minsk									
Tatiana Pirozhnikova	Judge, Maskowski District, Minsk									
Anastasia Achalava	Judge, Leninsky District, Minsk									
Tatiana Shotik	Judge, Leninsky District, Minsk									
Natalia Dedkova	Judge, Partyzanski District, Minsk									
Anastasia Kulik	Judge, Pyershamayski District, Minsk									
Maksim Trusevich	Judge, Pyershamayski District, Minsk									
Mikhail Yurchenko	Judge, Pyershamayski District, Minsk									
Marina Fedorova	Judge, Savyetski District, Minsk									
Vera Golovkova	Judge, Savyetski District, Minsk									
Siarhei Shatsila	Judge, Savyetski District, Minsk									
Aliaksandr Vouk (Aleksandr Volk)	Judge, Savyetski District, Minsk									
Yulia Hustyr	Judge, Tsentralny District, Minsk									
Dzmitriy Karsiuk (Dmitriy Karsyuk)	Judge, Tsentralny District, Minsk									
Ivan Kostyan	Judge, Tsentralny District, Minsk									
Viktoriya Shabunia	Judge, Tsentralny District, Minsk									
Elena Nekrasova	Judge, Zavodski District, Minsk									
Andrei Hrushko (Grushko)	Judge, Leninsky District, Brest									
Andrei Lahunovich (Lagunovich)	Judge, Savyetski District, Gomel									
Alexander Mokhorev	Judge, Savyetski District, Gomel									
Olesya Osipova	Judge, Central District, Gomel									
Anna Leusik	Judge, Leninsky District, Grodno									
Alena (Elena) Litvina	Judge, Leninsky District, Mogilev									
Elena Gormash	Judge of the Court of Babruysk District and Babruysk									
Anna Osipenko	Judge of the Court of Babruysk District and Babruysk									
Anton Dudal	Judge of the Court of Babruysk District and Babruysk									
Yekaterina Gruda	Judge of the Court of Baranavichy District and Baranavichy									
Inna Pavlovskaya	Judge of the Court of Baranavichy District and Baranavichy									
Vyacheslav Eliseenko	Judge of the Dokshytsy District Court									
Andrei Tarasevich	Judge of the Hlybokaye District Court									
Ludmila Vashchenko	Judge of the Hlybokaye District Court									
Gennadiy Kudlasevich	Judge of the Ivanava District Court									
Maksim Filatau (Filatov)	Judge of the Lida District Court									
Aleksei Irshin	Judge of the Maladzechna District Court									
Olga Dubovik	Judge of the Maladzechna District Court									
Vitali Sinilo	Chairman of the Masty District Court									
Galina Knizhonak	Judge of the Mazyr District Court									
Valiantsina Novikava	Judge of the Mazyr District Court									
Zinaida Balabolava	Judge of the Novopolotsk City Court									
Vadzim Mazol	Chairman of the Pruzhany District Court									
Iryna Pradun	Chairwoman of the Rahachow District Court									
Stanislav Ivanyutenko	Judge of the Rechytsa District Court									
Alexander Tarakanov	Judge of the Shklow District Court									
Viktor Novik	Judge of the Zhabinka District Court									
Nikolai Sergeevich	Judge of the Zhlobin District Court									

=== Propaganda and information systems ===
Name	Remarks	(Latvia)	(Estonia)	(Lithuania)	(European Union)	(United Kingdom)	(Canada)	(United States)	(Norway)	(Switzerland)	(Japan)	(New Zealand)	(Ukraine)
Ivan Eismant	Head of the National State Television and Radio Company of Belarus												
Alexander Zimovsky	Head of the National State Television and Radio Company of Belarus (2005–2010)												
Natallia Eismant	Press secretary of Alexander Lukashenko												
Vladimir Pertsov	Minister of Information of the Republic of Belarus (2021–2024)												
Vladimir Rusakevich	Minister of Information of the Republic of Belarus (2003–2009)												
Konstantin Shulgan	Minister of Communications and Informatization of the Republic of Belarus												
Igor Buzovski	Deputy Minister of Information												
Pavel Liohki	Deputy Minister of Information												
Yuriy Petruchenya	General Director, Beltelecom												
Aleksey Pinchuk	Head of the group of information support and cultural work, Military Academy of the Republic of Belarus												
Andrei Krivosheev	Head of the pro-government Belarusian Union of Journalists												
Vadim Gigin	Belarusian propagandist, head of the Belarus governmental society “Knowledge”, director of the National Library of Belarus												
Marat Markov	TV propagandist, then-manager of the state-owned ONT TV channel												
Grigory Azaryonok	TV presenter and propagandist, National State Television and Radio Company of Belarus												
Sergey Gusachenko	TV presenter and propagandist, National State Television and Radio Company of Belarus												
Ihar Tur	TV presenter and propagandist, National State Television and Radio Company of Belarus												
Ksenia Lebedeva	TV presenter and propagandist, National State Television and Radio Company of Belarus												
Irina Akulovich	Director-general of the Belarusian Telegraph Agency												
Dzmitry Zhuk	Editor-in-chief of Sovetskaya Belorussiya												
Andrei Mukovozchik	Newspaper propagandist, Sovetskaya Belorussiya												
Lyudmila Gladkaya	Newspaper propagandist, Sovetskaya Belorussiya												
Aleksandr Shpakovski	Pro-government political analyst												

=== Regional officials ===
Name	Remarks	(Latvia)	(Estonia)	(Lithuania)	(European Union)	(United Kingdom)	(Canada)	(United States)	(Norway)	(Switzerland)	(Ukraine)
Aleksandr Turchin	Chairman of the Minsk Region Executive Committee										
Leonid Zayats	Chairman of the Mahiliou Region Executive Committee (2019–2021), later Deputy Prime Minister										
Nikolay Sherstnyov	Chairman of Vitsebsk Region Executive Committee (2014–2021)										
Ivan Krupko	Chairman of Gomel Region Executive Committee since 2021										
Gennady Solovey	Chairman of Gomel Region Executive Committee (2019–2021)										
Vladimir Karanik	Chairman of Grodno Region Executive Committee since 2020, earlier Minister of Healthcare (2019–2020)										
Yuri Shuleiko	Chairman of Brest Region Executive Committee (2021–2024)										
Petr Kirichenko	Chairman of the Gomel City Executive Committee (2012–2022)										
Dmitry Petrusha	Head of Minsk Central District Administration (2018–2021)										
Anton Kulak	Chief of Architecture and Construction Department, Pyershamayski District, Minsk										

=== Security Forces ===
==== KGB ====
Name	Remarks	(Latvia)	(Estonia)	(Lithuania)	(European Union)	(United Kingdom)	(Canada)	(United States)	(Norway)	(Switzerland)	(Japan)	(Ukraine)
Ivan Tertel	Chairman of the KGB, earlier Chairman of the State Control Committee (2020) and Deputy Chairman of the KGB (2008–2020)											
Sergey Terebov	First Deputy Chairman of the KGB											
Oleg Chernyshov	Deputy Chairman of the KGB											
Vladimir Kalach	Deputy Chairman of the KGB											
Dmitry Reutski	Deputy Chairman of the KGB											
Valery Vakulchik	Former chairman of the KGB (2012–2020), State Secretary of the Security Council of Belarus in 2020											
Stepan Sukhorenko	Former Chairman of the KGB (2005–2007)											
Konstantin Bychek	Spokesperson of the KGB											

==== Interior Ministry ====
===== Central apparatus =====
Name	Remarks	(Latvia)	(Estonia)	(Lithuania)	(European Union)	(United Kingdom)	(Canada)	(United States)	(Norway)	(Switzerland)	(Japan)	(Ukraine)
Yury Karayeu	Minister of Internal Affairs (2019–2020), Major-General of Police											
Nikolay Karpenkov	Deputy Minister of Internal Affairs. Colonel of Police											
Ivan Kubrakov	Head of the Main Internal Affairs Directorate of the Minsk City Executive Committee, later Interior Minister											
Yuri Nazarenko	Deputy Minister of Internal Affairs. Commander of Internal Troops											
Aleksandr Barsukov	Deputy Minister of Internal Affairs, Chief of Public Security Police, Major General of Police											
Dmitriy Korzyuk	Deputy Minister of Internal Affairs, earlier Head of the Traffic Police											
Olga Chemodanova	Press Secretary of the Interior Ministry (2018–2021)											
Aleksandr Agafonov	Head of the Investigative Group											
Alexander Shepelev	Head of the Department for Safety and Security, Ministry of Internal Affairs											
Alexander Bykov	Commander of the Special Rapid Response Unit (SOBR), Lieutenant Colonel											
Andrei Belenkov	no data											
Andrei Zagorsky	Assistant Commander of the Internal Troops of the Ministry of Internal Affairs of the Republic of Belarus											
Dmitry Kuryan	Head of the Department of Law Enforcement of the Ministry of Internal Affairs											
Dmitry Pavlichenko	Head of the Interior Ministry's Special Forces Veterans Association											
Gennadiy Kazakevich	First Deputy Minister of Internal Affairs, Chief of the Criminal Police, Colonel of Police											
Igor Burmistrov	First Deputy Commander of Internal Troops of the Ministry of Internal Affairs – Head of Staff											
Yury Sivakov	Former Minister of Tourism and Sports, former Minister of Interior, and former Deputy Head of the Presidential Administration											
Khazalbek Atabekov	Deputy Commander of Internal Troops of the Ministry of Internal Affairs of Belarus											
Maksim Rusanovich	SOBR employee											
Mikhail Valko	Head of Operative Command of the Interior Ministry											
Oleg Karazei	Head of the Penitentiary Department of the Ministry of Internal Affairs of Belarus											
Oleg Matkin	Head of Penal Correction Department in the Ministry of Internal Affairs, Major-General of Police											
Oleg Belyakov	Deputy Head of Penal Correction Department in the Ministry of Internal Affairs											
Sergey Zubkov	Alpha Group Commander											
Oleg Shablyko	Deputy Head of the Security Department, Head of Ideology and Staffing											
Roman Melnik	Head of the Main Department of Law Enforcement and Prevention											
Sergei Khomenko	Minister of Justice since 2021, earlier Deputy Minister of Internal Affairs, Major-General of Police											
Uladzimir Navumau	Former Minister of the Interior. Former Head of the President's Security Service											
Vasili Vasiukovich	Deputy Chief of Staff, Head of Control and Inspection Division of the Interior Ministry											
Viktor Stanislavchik	Deputy Head of Department - Head of Public Security Police											
Viktoria Dashkova	Police camerawoman											
Vladimir Romaniuk	Securities forces soldier											
Vladislav Mandrik	Head of the Correctional Process Organization Department, Interior Ministry											
Yevgeniy Savich	Member of the Internal Troops Spetsnaz											

===== GUBOPiK =====
Name	Remarks	(Latvia)	(Estonia)	(Lithuania)	(European Union)	(United Kingdom)	(Canada)	(United States)	(Norway)	(Switzerland)
Andrei Ananenko	Head of GUBOPiK									
Andrei Parshin	Head of GUBOPiK (2021–2022)									
Oleg Larin	Deputy Head of GUBOPiK									
Denis Chemodanov	Deputy Head of GUBOPiK									
Mikhail Bedunkevich	Deputy Head of GUBOPiK									
Dmitriy Kovach	Deputy Head of GUBOPiK, earlier a divisional leader of it									
Vasiliy Sysoyev	A divisional leader of GUBOPiK									
Aleksandr Zhivlyuk	A divisional leader of GUBOPiK									
Andrei Makarevich	A divisional leader of GUBOPiK									
Vladimir Vashkevich	A divisional leader of GUBOPiK									
Aleksandr Alyoksa	A divisional leader of GUBOPiK									

===== OMON =====
Name	Remarks	(Latvia)	(Estonia)	(Lithuania)	(European Union)	(United Kingdom)	(Canada)	(United States)	(Norway)	(Switzerland)
Dmitry Balaba	Head of OMON, Minsk									
Yuri Podobed	Former head of OMON, Minsk									
Aleksey Kovalyov	Commander of OMON group, Minsk City Police Department									
Leonid Zhuravski	Head of OMON in Vitsebsk									
Maksim Mikhovich	Head of OMON in Brest, Lieutenant Colonel									
Mikhail Domarnatski	Head of OMON, Homiel									
Nikolay Gorelikov	Head of OMON, Mahiliou									
Viktor Kravtsevich	OMON commander, Hrodna									
Andrei Khomich	Commander of OMON Operative Company, Minsk Police Department									
Dmitry Zhmuro	Commander of OMON Operative Company, Hrodna District									
Kirill Yanushonok	OMON Operational Company Department Commander, Vitsebsk Region									
Sergey Manaev	Deputy Commander of the OMON of the Vitsebsk Regional Executive Committee, responsible for ideological work and staffing									
Pavel Asovik	OMON soldier, Minsk Police Department									

===== Prison officials =====
Name	Remarks	(Latvia)	(Estonia)	(Lithuania)	(European Union)	(United Kingdom)	(Canada)	(Norway)	(Switzerland)
Ruslan Mashadiyev	Head of Penal Colony No. 1, earlier Deputy Head of Penal Colony No. 1								
Andrei Palchik	Former head of Penal Colony No. 1, Novopolotsk								
Svetlana Pokhodova	Head of Penal Colony No. 4 for women, Gomel								
Yevgeniy Bubich	Head of Penal Colony No. 2, Babruysk								
Filip Sturchanka	Head of Penal Colony No. 3								
Denis Tolstenkov	Head of Penal Colony No. 4, Gomel								
Sergey Petrakovich	Head of Penal Colony No. 9, Horki								
Viktor Dubrovka	Head of Penal Colony No. 11, Vawkavysk								
Vadim Murashko	Head of Penal Colony No. 13, Hlybokaye								
Yuriy Vasilevich	Head of Penal Colony No. 14, Novosady								
Aleksey Lazarenko	Head of Penal Colony No. 15								
Alexander Kornienko	Former head of the Penal Colony No. 17, Shklow								
Andrey Tsedrik	Head of Pre-trial Detention Centre No. 1, Minsk								
Pavel Kazakov	Head of Prison No. 1, Grodno								
Sergey Bereishik	Deputy head of Pre-trial Detention Centre No. 1, Minsk								
Nikolai Mushkarov	Deputy head of labour service Pre-trial Detention Centre No. 1, Minsk								
Vasily Koleda	Deputy head of Prison No. 1, Grodno								
Sergey Karchevskiy	Head of the regime department of Penal Colony No. 17, Shklow								
Viktor Lutsev	Head of the medical unit of Prison No. 1, Grodno								
Sergey Masliukov	Head colonel of the internal service of Educational Colony No. 2, Babruysk								
Andrey Lilya	Chief Ideologist and HR, Penal Colony No. 13, Hlybokaye								
Artiom Bagrets	Guard, Penal Colony No. 1, Novopolotsk								

===== Regional police officials =====
Name	Remarks	(Latvia)	(Estonia)	(Lithuania)	(European Union)	(United Kingdom)	(Canada)	(United States)	(Norway)	(Switzerland)
Mikhail Hryb	Head of the Minsk City Police Department									
Aleksandr Vasilyev	Head of the Department of Internal Affairs of Homiel Region Executive Committee									
Anatoly Vasiliev	Head of Department of Internal Affairs of Homiel Region									
Oleg Shulyakovsky	First Deputy Head of the Department of Internal Affairs of Homiel Executive Committee; Head of Criminal Police									
Aleksandr Voiteshko	Head of Traffic Police, Hrodna Region									
Alexander Aleshkevich	First Deputy Head of the District Department of Internal Affairs in Maskouski District, Minsk, Head of Criminal Police									
Alexander Pavlovich	Head of the Department of Internal Affairs of Homiel Region Executive Committee									
Aleksandr Kisel	Chief of the Public Security Police of the Internal Affairs Directorate of the Brest Regional Executive Committee									
Aleksandr Astreiko	Head of Department of Internal Affairs of Brest Region Executive Committee, Major-General of Police									
Ivan Sokolovski	Director of the Okrestina detention centre, Minsk									
Leonid Kruk	Chief of Public Order Protection Department, Uzda District									
Andrei Guz	Police Battalion Commander, Savyetski District of Minsk									
Dmitry Shumilin	Deputy Head of Mass Events, Minsk Police									
Maxim Gamola	Head of the Police Department of Maskouski District, Minsk									
Andrei Galenka	Deputy Head of the District Department of Internal Affairs in Maskouski District, Minsk, Head of Public Safety Police									
Aleksei Shakhovich	Head of the Department of Law Enforcement and Prevention, Chief of the Public Security Police of the Internal Affairs Directorate of the Vitsebsk Regional Executive Committee									
Andrei Lagota	Chief of the Department of the Interior, Zhabinka District									
Andrei Prikhodko	Precinct Police Inspector, Savyetski District, Minsk									
Sergey Kalinnik	First Deputy Head of the Department of Internal Affairs, Head of the Criminal Police, Savyetski District of Minsk									
Gennadiy Solovey	Deputy Chief - Chief of the Public Security Police of the Salihorsk District									
Dmitriy Vishnevskiy	Chief Minors Affairs Inspector, Orsha District									
Sergei Semenov	Senior detective of the Drug Control and Anti-Trafficking group, Criminal Police, Rahachou District									
Yegor Guk	Chief of Special Police Group, Department of Security, Lida District									
Sergey Grib	Head of Police Station number 2, Skidzel, Hrodna Region									
Sergey Gerashchenko	District police inspector, Chachersk District									
Sergey Solovey	Deputy Head of the Salihorsk District Department of Internal Affairs									
Vadim Prigara	Police Chief, Maladzechna District									
Valery Zhuk	Acting Deputy Chief of Police, Valozhyn District									
Vitaliy Stasiukevich	Deputy Head of the Public Security Police, Hrodna									
Vitaliy Osotski	Head of the Vaukavysk District Department of Internal Affairs									
Mikhail Murashkin	Former Deputy Head of the Municipal Department of Internal Affairs in Zhodzina; First Deputy Head of the District Department of Internal Affairs in Barysaw									
Nikolai Maksimovich	Deputy Chief of the Public Security Militia, Internal Affairs Directorate of the Minsk Regional Executive Committee									

==== Prosecutor's Office ====
Name	Remarks	(Latvia)	(Estonia)	(Lithuania)	(European Union)	(United Kingdom)	(Canada)	(United States)	(Norway)	(Switzerland)	(Japan)	(Ukraine)
Andrei Shved	Prosecutor General of Belarus											
Alexey Stuk	Deputy Prosecutor General of the Republic of Belarus											
Alyaksandr Kanyuk	Former Prosecutor General of the Republic of Belarus											

==== Investigative Committee ====
Name	Remarks	(Latvia)	(Estonia)	(Lithuania)	(European Union)	(United Kingdom)	(Canada)	(United States)	(Norway)	(Switzerland)	(Japan)	(Ukraine)
Dmitry Gora	Chairman of the Investigative Committee of Belarus											
Ivan Noskevich	Former Chairman of the Investigative Committee of Belarus											
Anatoli Vasiliev	Deputy Chairman of the Investigative Committee											
Sergei Azemsha	Deputy Chairman of the Investigative Committee											
Alexey Volkov	Deputy Chairman of the Investigative Committee											
Oleg Shandarovich	Deputy Chairman of the Investigative Committee											
Andrei Smal	Deputy Chairman of the Investigative Committee											
Gennadi Dysko	Deputy Chairman of the Investigative Committee											
Aleksei Kovrizhkin	Head of the Investigation Group of the Central Apparatus of the Investigative Committee											

==== State Border Committee ====
Name	Remarks	(Latvia)	(Estonia)	(Lithuania)	(European Union)	(United Kingdom)	(Canada)	(United States)	(Norway)	(Switzerland)	(Japan)	(Ukraine)
Anatol Lapo	Then-Chairman of the committee (until 2023)											
Igor Butkevich	First Deputy Chairman of the Committee											
Siarhei Novikau	Deputy Chairman of the Committee											
Ihar Pechan	Deputy Chairman of the Committee											
Raman Podlineu	Deputy Chairman of the Committee											
Konstantin Molostov	Then-Head of the Grodno Border Group, Chairman of the Committee since 2023											
Igor Gutnik	Head of the Brest Border Group											
Maksim Butranets	Head of the Smorgon Border Detachment											
Aliaksandr Davidziuk	Head of the Lida Border Detachment											
Pavel Kharchanka	Head of the Polotsk Border Detachment											
Igor Kriuchkov	Head of OSAM											

=== Military ===
Name	Remarks	(Latvia)	(Estonia)	(Lithuania)	(European Union)	(United Kingdom)	(Canada)	(United States)	(Norway)	(Switzerland)	(Japan)	(Australia)	(New Zealand)	(Ukraine)
Viktor Khrenin	Minister of Defence													
Pavel Muraveiko	Chief of the General Staff of the Armed Forces of Belarus (since 2024), earlier First Deputy Secretary of State of the Security Council of Belarus (2022–2024)													
Viktor Gulevich	Chief of the General Staff of the Armed Forces of Belarus (2021–2024)													
Andrei Fedin	Deputy Minister of Defence													
Andrei Zhuk	Deputy Minister of Defence													
Vadim Denisenko	Commander of the Special Forces of Belarus													
Igor Golub	Commander of the Belarusian Air Force													
Andrei Gurtsevich	First Deputy Commander of the Belarusian Air Force													
Oleg Voinov	Head of the International Military Cooperation Department of the Ministry of Defence, later director of the National Archive of Belarus													

=== State Authority for Military Industry ===
Name	Remarks	(European Union)	(United Kingdom)	(Canada)	(United States)	(Norway)	(Switzerland)	(Japan)	(Australia)	(New Zealand)	(Ukraine)
Dmitry Pantus	Chairman of the State Authority for Military Industry										
Oleg Mishchenko	First Deputy Chairman of the State Authority for Military Industry										
Viachaslau Rassalai	Deputy Chairman of the State Authority for Military Industry										

=== State Control Committee ===
Name	Remarks	(Latvia)	(Estonia)	(Lithuania)	(European Union)	(United Kingdom)	(Canada)	(United States)	(Norway)	(Switzerland)
Vasily Gerasimov	Chairman of the State Control Committee									
Igor Marshalov	Deputy Chairman of the State Control Committee, Director of the Financial Investigations Department of the State Control Committee									
Andrey Prokopuk	Deputy Director of the Financial Investigations Department of the State Control Committee									
Victor Selitskiy	Deputy Director of the Financial Investigations Department of the State Control Committee									
Viktor Franskevich	Deputy Director of the Financial Investigations Department of the State Control Committee									
Artem Dunko	Senior Inspector for Special Matters of the Financial Investigations Department of the State Control Committee									

=== Prime Minister and his deputies ===
Name	Remarks	(Latvia)	(Estonia)	(Lithuania)	(European Union)	(United Kingdom)	(Canada)	(United States)	(Norway)	(Switzerland)	(Ukraine)
Roman Golovchenko	Prime Minister since June 2020										
Syarhey Rumas	Former Prime Minister (before June 2020)										
Anatoli Sivak	Deputy Prime Minister since 2020, earlier Chairman of the Minsk City Executive Committee (2018–2020)										
Igor Petrishenko	Deputy Prime Minister										
Yuriy Nazarov	Deputy Prime Minister (until 2022), later Head of the Management Department of the Presidential Administration										

=== Other government officials ===
Name	Remarks	(Latvia)	(Estonia)	(Lithuania)	(European Union)	(United Kingdom)	(Canada)	(United States)	(Norway)	(Switzerland)	(Ukraine)
Vladimir Makei	Minister of Foreign Affairs (2012–2022)										
Aleksey Avramenko	Minister of Transport and Communications (2019–2023)										
Yuriy Seliverstov	Minister of Finance										
Aleksandr Chervyakov	Minister of Economy										
Viktor Karankevich	Minister of Energy										
Anatoly Markevich	Minister of Culture										
Sergey Kovalchuk	Minister of Sport and Tourism										
Viktar Halavanau	Minister of Justice (2001–2011)										
Alexander Radkov	Minister of Education (2003–2010), First Deputy Head of the Presidential Administration (2010–2014), leader of Belaya Rus (2007–2018)										
Andrei Pavlyuchenko	Head of the Operations and Analysis Center										
Alexei Lyakhnovich	Deputy Minister of Transport and Communications										
Artsiom Sikorsky	Director for the Aviation Department of the Ministry of Transport and Communication										
Mikhail Portnoy	Deputy Minister of Sport and Tourism										
Anatoly Glaz	Spokesperson of the Ministry of Foreign Affairs										

=== Members of the National Assembly of Belarus ===
Name	Remarks	(Latvia)	(Estonia)	(Lithuania)	(European Union)	(United Kingdom)	(Canada)	(United States)	(Norway)	(Switzerland)	(Japan)	(Ukraine)	(Australia)	(New Zealand)
Natalya Kochanova	Speaker of the Council of the Republic of Belarus													
Dzmitry Baskau	Member of the Council of the Republic of Belarus, former Chief of Belarusian Ice Hockey Association													
Oleg Romanov	Member of the Council of the Republic of Belarus, leader of political party Belaya Rus													
Vladimir Andreichenko	Then-Speaker of the House of Representatives													
Gennady Davydko	Member of the House of Representatives, Chairperson of the Standing Commission on Human Rights and Media													
Oleg Gaidukevich	Member of the House of Representatives, Deputy Chairperson of the Standing Commission on International Affairs													
Svetlana Liubetskaya	Member of the House of Representatives, Chairperson of the Standing Commission on Law													
Aleksei Yegorov	Member of the House of Representatives, Deputy Chairperson of the Standing Commission on Law													
Aleksandr Omelyaniuk	Member of the House of Representatives, Deputy Chairperson of the Standing Commission on Law													
Oleg Belokonev	Member of the House of Representatives, Deputy Chairperson of the Standing Commission on National Security													
Dzmitry Shautsou	Member of the House of Representatives (since 2024) and General Secretary of the Belarus Red Cross (since 2021); earlier Head of Minsk City Elections Commission during the 2020 election, Chief of 1st Clinical Hospital of Minsk (2020–2021)													

=== Managers of the state-owned enterprises ===
Name	Remarks	(European Union)	(United Kingdom)	(Canada)	(United States)	(Norway)	(Switzerland)	(Australia)	(New Zealand)	(Ukraine)
Igor Kuzmenko	CEO of 558 Aircraft Repair Plant									
Pavel Pinigin	Former CEO of 558 Aircraft Repair Plant									
Leonid Churo	CEO of Belaeronavigatsia									
Vladimir Morozov	CEO of Belarusian Railway									
Dmitriy Korchik	CEO of Belarusian Steel Works									
Andrei Rybakov	CEO of Belaruskali (since 2024), earlier CEO of Belneftekhim									
Ivan Golovaty	CEO of Belaruskali (until 2024) and Member of the Council of the Republic of Belarus									
Sergei Nikiforovich	CEO of BelAZ									
Alexander Moroz	CEO of BelOMO									
Alexey Shkadarevich	Head of the STC "LEMT", a BelOMO subsidiary									
Andrei Bunakov	CEO of Belshina									
Igor Lyashenko	CEO of Grodno Azot									
Valery Ivankovich	CEO of Minsk Automobile Plant									
Vyacheslav Khoroneko	Minsk National Airport director									
Aliaksei Rymasheuski	CEO of MZKT									
Aliaksandr Vetsianevich	Deputy CEO of MZKT									
Pavel Sluchak	CEO of Orsha Aircraft Repair Plant									
Dmitry Braim	Deputy CEO for Production of Peleng									
Anatoly Savenok	CEO of StankoGomel									
Nikolai Gaichuk	CEO of Zenit-BelOMO									
Aleksandr Ilyushchenko	CEO of State Scientific and Production Association of Powder Metallurgy									

=== Businesspeople ===
Name	Remarks	(European Union)	(United Kingdom)	(Canada)	(United States)	(Norway)	(Switzerland)	(Japan)	(Australia)	(New Zealand)	(Ukraine)
Mikalai Varabei	Businessman. According to the EU, he "is benefiting from and supporting the Lukashenka regime."										
Ekaterina Smushkovich	Mikalai Varabei's daughter.										
Aliaksei Aleksin	According to the EU, "Aliaksei Aleksin is one of the leading businessmen in Belarus, with business interests in the sectors of oil and energy, real estate, development, logistics, tobacco, retail, finance and others. He enjoys a close relationship with Aliaksandr Lukashenka and his son and former National Security Advisor Viktar Lukashenka. He is active in the biker movement in Belarus, a hobby he shares with Viktar Lukashenka. His company owns property in “Alexandria 2” (Mogilev region), commonly called “presidential residence”, where Aliaksandr Lukashenka is a frequent visitor."										
Inna Aleksina	Aliaksei Aleksin's wife.										
Dzmitry Aleksin	Aliaksei Aleksin's son.										
Vitaly Aleksin	Aliaksei Aleksin's son.										
Aleksandr Zaitsev	Businessman.										
Mikhail Gutseriyev	Russian businessman, owner of SAFMAR, Slavkali and Slavneft companies. According to the EU, Gutseriyev "is a long-time friend of Aliaksandr Lukashenka and thanks to this association has accumulated significant wealth and influence among the political elite in Belarus. “SAFMAR”, a company controlled by Gutseriyev, was the only Russian oil firm that carried on supplying oil to Belarusian refineries during the energy crisis between Belarus and Russia in early 2020."										
Siarhei Tsiatsieryn	Businessman. According to the EU, "Siarhei is one of the leading businessmen operating in Belarus, with business interests in distribution of alcohol drinks (through his company “Belglobalstart”), food products and furniture. He belongs to Lukashenko's inner circle. In 2019, Belglobalstart was granted an opportunity to start the construction of a multi-functional business centre in front of the presidential palace in Minsk. He co-owns the company VIBEL that sells commercials on a number of Belarusian national TV channels. He is the chairman of Belarusian Tennis Federation and former Lukashenka's aide for sports matters."										
Aliaksandr Shakutsin	Businessman. According to the EU, he "is reported to be one of the persons who benefited most from the privatisation during Lukashenko's tenure as President."										
Valentin Baiko	Businessman and Member of the Council of the Republic of Belarus.										
Vladimir Peftiev	Belarusian businessman.										
Pavel Topuzidis	Businessman.										
Olga Sheiman	Businesswoman, Viktor Sheiman's daughter.										
Sergei Sheiman	Businessman, Viktor Sheiman's son.										
Anna Pushkareva	Viktor Sheiman's alleged business partner.										
Bogoljub Karić	Businessman, the key figure in Dana Holdings.										
Nebojsa Karić	Businessman, one of the key figures in Dana Holdings, son of Bogoljub Karić.										
Aliaksandr Shatrou	CEO of Synesis.										
Ivan Nareiko	Director of Rada Airlines.										
Dmitry Ishchenko	Commercial Director of Rada Airlines.										
Evgeniy Mikholap	Director of Rubystar Airways.										
Vladimir Chudakov	Director of KB Unmanned Helicopters.										

=== State university rectors ===
Name	Remarks	(European Union)	(Norway)	(Switzerland)
Sergey Rubnikovich	Belarusian State Medical University rector			
Mikhail Borozna	Belarusian State Academy of Arts rector			
Aleksandr Bakhanovich	Brest State Technical University rector			

=== Others ===
Name	Remarks	(Latvia)	(Estonia)	(Lithuania)	(United States)	(European Union)	(Norway)	(Switzerland)	(Ukraine)
Mikhail Orda	Chief of state-controlled Federation of Unions								
Alexander Lukyanov	First Secretary of the Central Committee of the Belarusian Republican Youth Union								
Vladimir Bazanov	Then-chief of Football Federation of Belarus								
Andrei Krivonosov	Military Commissary of the Homiel Region								
Igor Romanionok	Employee of Fire Brigade Number 12, Minsk								
Dmitry Shakuta	Former champion kickboxer								
Maksim Nedasekau	Belarusian high jumper								

=== Belarusian and Belarus-related entities ===
==== Government institutions ====
Name	Remarks	(European Union)	(United Kingdom)	(Canada)	(United States)	(Norway)	(Switzerland)	(Japan)	(Australia)	(New Zealand)	(Ukraine)
Alpha Group	An elite unit of the State Security Committee of the Republic of Belarus										
Brest Region Police Department											
Central Election Commission of Belarus	The body responsible for conducting national elections and overseeing local elections in Belarus										
Financial Investigations Department	A department of the State Control Committee										
Gomel Region Police Department											
GUBOPiK	A state security service of Belarus										
Internal Troops of Belarus	A paramilitary law enforcement force in Belarus subordinate to the Ministry of Internal Affairs										
Investigative Committee of Belarus	A preliminary inquiry body										
KGB	The national intelligence agency of Belarus										
Ministry of Defence											
Minsk City Police Department											
Minsk Special Purpose Police Unit (Minsk OMON)	The Minsk subdivision of the riot police of Belarus										
National Bank of Belarus											
Okrestina	A pre-trial detention centre in Minsk										
Special Purpose Police Units (OMON)	The Minsk subdivision of the riot police of Belarus										
OSAM	A Belarusian special border guard unit										
State Authority for Military Industry	A Belarusian government agency that oversees the creation and coordination of Belarusian defence products.										

==== State−owned companies ====
Name	Remarks	(European Union)	(United Kingdom)	(Canada)	(United States)	(Norway)	(Switzerland)	(Japan)	(Australia)	(New Zealand)	(Ukraine)
140 Repair Plant	A special purpose equipment producer										
558 Aircraft Repair Plant	A special purpose equipment producer										
AGAT Electromechanical Plant	A special purpose equipment producer										
Bank Dabrabyt	A state-owned commercial bank										
Baranavichy Machine Tool Accessories Plant	An enterprise for the production of technological equipment for metalworking machines, located in Baranavichy										
Belaeronavigatsia	A state-owned enterprise responsible for Belarusian air traffic control										
Belagroprombank	A state-owned commercial bank										
Belarusbank	A state-owned commercial bank										
Belarusian Potash Company	The main distributor of potash fertilizers produced by Belaruskali										
Belarusian Railway	The national state-owned railway company of Belarus										
Belaruskali	Largest potash producer in Belarus										
Belavia	The flag carrier and national airline of Belarus										
BelAZ	Belarusian automobile plant										
Belintertrans	A railway operator, a subsidiary of Belarusian Railway										
Belinvestbank	A state-owned commercial bank										
Belkommunmash	A state-owned manufacturer of electric public transport vehicles										
Bellegprom	Belarusian state concern for the production and sale of goods of light industry										
Bellesbumprom	A state production and trade concern of forestry, woodworking and paper industry										
Belneftekhim	An association of petrochemical companies in Belarus, subordinated to the Council of Ministers				(Note: This entity has already been added to the US sanctions list after the 2006 or the 2010 election; the sanctions against these entities were temporarily lifted in 2015 and reintroduced following the 2020 election.)						
BelOMO	A state-owned optics manufacturing company										
Belorusneft	A state-owned petrochemical company										
Belshina	A tire manufacturer in Belarus	(Note: The European Union sanctions against this entity were subsequently annulled by a court decision.)									
Belspetsvneshtechnika	A state foreign trade unitary enterprise that specializes in arms trade and production										
Belteleradio	The state television and radio broadcasting service										
Belarusian Steel Works	A state company operating in the steel industry, located in Zhlobin										
Development Bank	A state-owned commercial bank										
Gomel chemical plant	A state-run producer of mineral fertilizers located in Gomel										
Gomel Plant of Casting and Normals	A subsidiary of GomSelMash, located in Gomel										
Gomel Plant of Machine Tools and Assemblies											
Gomel radio plant	A state-run plant located in Gomel										
GomSelMash	A state-run manufacturer of agricultural machinery located in Gomel										
Grodno Azot	A Belarusian state-run producer of nitrogen compounds and fertilizers located in Grodno										
Grodno tobacco factory	Largest cigarette producer in Belarus										
Horizont	A state-run home appliances producer, located in Minsk										
Hotel Minsk	A state-owned hotel in Minsk										
Hotel Planeta	A state-owned hotel in Minsk										
Institute of Powder Metallurgy of the National Academy of Sciences of Belarus											
Integral	A state-owned IC producer										
Kamvol	A large manufacturer of textile products, located in Minsk										
Krasny Borets	A machine tool plant, located in Orsha										
Lakokraska	Belarusian producer of paints and varnishes located in Lida										
MAZ	Minsk automobile plant										
Minsk Bearing Plant	A state-run machine-building enterprise located in Minsk										
Minsk Gear Plant	A state-run gear manufacturer located in Minsk										
Minsk Civil Aviation Plant 407	A state-owned aircraft component manufacturer and repair facility located in Minsk										
Minsk Electrotechnical Plant	A state-owned producer of electricity equipment located in Minsk										
Minsk Machine Tool Plant	A large manufacturer of textile products										
Minsk Research Institute of Radio Materials	A research enterprise within the National Academy of Sciences of Belarus, located in Minsk.										
Mogilev Metallurgical Plant	A state-run plant located in Mogilev										
Mozyr Oil Refinery	A state-owned oil refinery located in Mazyr										
MTZ	Minsk Tractor Works										
MZKT	Minsk Wheel Tractor Plant										
Naftan	A Belarusian state-owned oil refinery located in Novopolotsk										
NIIEVM (Research Institute of Electronic Computers)	A state-owned developer and producer of dual-use computer equipment										
Orsha Aircraft Repair Plant	A state-owned aircraft repair and manufacturer plant, located in Orsha										
Orsha linen mill	A manufacturer of linen fabrics and products, located in Orsha										
Peleng	A state-owned defence producer and an equipment for forensic, security, and surveillance systems manufacturer										
Polesie	A knitwear company, located in Pinsk										
Polotsk Steklovolokno	A Belarusian state-owned glass manufacturer located in Polotsk										
Precision Electromechanics Plant	A Belarusian state defence enterprise										
State Scientific and Production Association of Powder Metallurgy											
StankoGomel	A machine tool enterprise, located in Gomel										
Svetlogorskkhimvolokno	A Belarusian state-run producer of polyester materials located in Svietlahorsk										
TransAVIAexport Airlines	A Belarusian national airline involved in air transportation of cargo										
Vistan	A machine tool enterprise, located in Vitebsk										
Zenit-BelOMO	A subsidiary of BelOMO, located in Vileyka										

==== Other notable entities ====
Name	Remarks	(European Union)	(United Kingdom)	(Canada)	(United States)	(Norway)	(Switzerland)	(Japan)	(Australia)	(New Zealand)	(Ukraine)
Absolutbank	A private commercial bank										
Alfa-Bank	A commercial bank, controlled by Alfa-Bank (Russia)										
Amkodor	A privately owned machine-building company.										
Babruysk Machine Building Plant	A centrifugal pump manufacturing plant, located in Babruysk and owned by the HMS Group										
Bank BelVEB	A commercial bank, owned mostly by VEB.RF (Russia)										
Belarus Olympic Committee											
Belarusian Republican Youth Union	The pro-government youth organization										
Belarusrezinotekhnika	A Belarusian rubber products manufacturer										
Belcanto Airlines	A private Belarusian cargo airline										
Belgazprombank	A commercial bank, owned by Gazprom and Gazprombank (Russia)										
BNB bank	A commercial bank, owned by Bank of Georgia										
Cham Wings Airlines	A private Syrian airline				(Note: Cham Wings Airlines was designated by this state not as part of the Belarusian sanctions program.)						
Dana Holdings	A private group of construction companies										
KB Display	A special-purpose computers and information display devices producer										
KB Unmanned Helicopters	A private Belarusian manufacturer of the unmanned aerial vehicles										
Minotor-Service	A company that manufactures and maintains land and amphibious combat tracked vehicles										
MTBank	A private commercial bank										
Paritetbank	A private commercial bank										
Priorbank	A private commercial bank, owned mostly by Raiffeisen Bank International (Austria)										
Rada Airlines	A private Belarusian cargo airline										
Rubystar Airways	A private Belarusian cargo airline										
Sberbank	A commercial bank, owned by Russian Sberbank										
StatusBank	A private commercial bank										
Svyazinvest	A Belarusian developer and manufacturer of telecommunications equipment										
Synesis Group	A private IT company that provides a surveillance platform, among other products										
Vitebsk Plant of Radio Components "Monolith"	A Belarusian company of the electronics industry, located in Vitebsk										
VTB Bank Belarus	A commercial bank, owned mostly by VTB Bank (Russia)										

== Circumvention of sanctions ==
In 2020 and 2021, Belarusian authorities made various efforts to circumvent the Western sanctions. They also hid the statistics to prevent revealing the ways used to circumvent them and track their effects. In particular, access to data regarding production and exports of the sanctioned goods became restricted to public. In October 2021, Belstat started to hide data regarding exports of tractors and trucks. Overall classified exports in January–August 2021 is estimated at US$8.2 billion. In September 2021, Alexander Lukashenko mentioned minister of industry Petr Parkhomchik and vice prime minister Yuriy Nazarov as the people who organized the circumvention of sanctions. He also accused several workers of state factories of gathering information about the ways used to circumvent the sanctions, and he threatened them with imprisonment. 13 workers from Grodno Azot fertilizer factory, Naftan oil refinery, BMZ steel mill and Belarusian Railway were arrested by the Belarusian KGB in a possible connection with this statement. It was reported that some of them were accused of state treason. At least two of them were later released.

Shareholder structure of several companies was changed in order to take the subsidiary companies out from the restrictions. It was suggested that companies related to Lukashenko's deputy businessperson Mikalai Varabei were used to bypass the sanctions in the petroleum sector of industry. Polisch political scientist Piotr Żochowski suggested that the authorities will redirect their exports "through a chain of intermediaries in other countries", thus partially circumventing the sanctions.

Some Western companies helped Belarusian authorities to avoid sanctions or lobbied their lifting. In October 2021, director of the state-owned BMZ steel mill boasted that his factory wasn't sanctioned "due to certain actions taken by BMZ clients". In October 2021, Belgian authorities showed interest in easing of sanctions against Belarusian potash industry. It was later revealed that Belgian chemical company Tessenderlo Group lobbied this initiative.

Journalists uncovered ways of circumventing the sanctions against the Belarusian Steel Works, Belaruskali, BelAZ, Dana Holdings, Grodno Azot, Integral, Naftan, Aliaksei Aleksin, Mikhail Gutseriev, Aliaksandr Shakutsin, Mikalai Varabei and Aliaksandr Zaitsau, among others.

== See also ==
- Censorship in Belarus
- Human rights in Belarus
- List of people and organizations sanctioned during the Russian invasion of Ukraine
- 2010 Belarusian presidential election
- 2006 Belarusian presidential election
- 2004 Belarusian referendum
- 1996 Belarusian referendum
