= Vadim Gigin =

Belarusian television host

Vadim Frantsevich Gigin
- Вадим Францевич Гигин
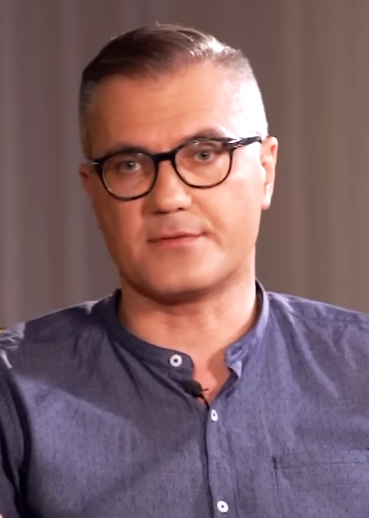

Dean of the Faculty of Philosophy and Social Sciences at the Belarusian State University
- In office 2016–2021
- President: Alexander Lukashenko

Chief editor of Bielaruskaja Dumka
- In office 2008–2016
- President: Alexander Lukashenko

Vadim Gigin (Russian: Вадим Францевич Гигин; Belarusian: Вадзім Гігін, romanized: Vadzim Hihin; born October 21, 1977) is a Belarusian propagandist, TV host, historian and politician. He was included into a sanctions list of the European Union in 2011–2016 and since 2023.

== Biography ==
In 1999 Gigin graduated from the History Faculty of the Belarusian State University and worked in the press service of the Prosecution Service of the Republic of Belarus under another well-known propagandist, Jury Azaryonok.

In 2006–2008 Gigin was head of the Minsk city branch of the state youth organization, the Belarusian Republican Youth Union.

From 2008 to 2016, Gigin was chief editor of the magazine Bielaruskaja Dumka, published by the Presidential Administration of Belarus.

From 2016 to 2021, Gigin was the Dean of the Faculty of Philosophy and Social Sciences at the Belarusian State University.

He was also moderator of a political talk show on the state-owned TV channel ONT.

In June 2023, Gigin was appointed director of the National Library of Belarus. Following the 2024 election, Gigin became a deputy of the House of Representatives of Belarus.

== Accusations and sanctions ==
Vadim Gigin has been criticized for advocating and promoting Russian nationalism and a Russian nationalist view on the History of Belarus. He has publicly praised the 19th century Russian administrator of what now are Belarus and Lithuania, Mikhail Muravyov-Vilensky, known for his harsh policy of Russification and repressions against participants of the anti-Russian January Uprising.

In 2011, after the wave of repressions that followed the 2010 presidential election, Vadim Gigin and several other top managers and employees of major state media became subject to an EU travel ban and asset freeze as part of a sanctions list of 208 individuals responsible for political repressions, electoral fraud and propaganda in Belarus. The sanctions were lifted in 2016.

In the EU Council's decision, Gigin was described as "one of the most vocal and influential members of the state propaganda machine in the printed press. He has supported and justified the repression of the democratic opposition and of civil society, which are systematically highlighted in a negative and derogatory way using falsified information, in particular after the Presidential elections in 2010."

In October 2022, Ukraine imposed sanctions against Gigin.

In August 2023, Gigin was again added to the sanctions list of the European Union. In the same month, Switzerland, North Macedonia, Montenegro, Albania, Ukraine, Bosnia and Herzegovina, Iceland, Liechtenstein and Norway joined these sanctions.

== See also ==
- List of people and organizations sanctioned in relation to human rights violations in Belarus
