= Vladimir Pertsov =

Belarusian politician (born 1974)

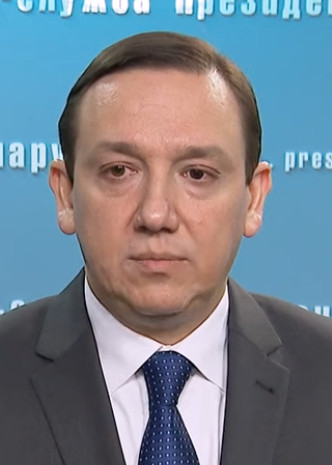
- Vladimir Pertsov in 2021

First deputy head of the Presidential Administration of Belarus
- Incumbent
- Assumed office 22 May 2025
- Preceded by: Natalia Petkevich

Deputy head of the Presidential Administration of Belarus
- In office 8 April 2024 – 22 May 2025
- President: Alexander Lukashenko

Minister of Information
- In office 5 April 2021 – 8 April 2024
- President: Alexander Lukashenko
- Prime Minister: Roman Golovchenko
- Preceded by: Igor Lutsky
- Succeeded by: Marat Markov

Personal details
- Born: 7 May 1974 (age 52) Vitebsk, Byelorussian SSR, Soviet Union
- Education: Vitebsk State University

Vladimir Borisovich Pertsov (Russian: Влади́мир Бори́сович Перцо́в; Belarusian: Уладзі́мір Бары́савіч Пярцо́ў; born 7 May 1974) is a Belarusian politician serving as first deputy head of the Presidential Administration since 2025. From 2021 to 2024, he served as minister of information.

== Early life and education ==
Vladimir Pertsov was born on 7 May 1954 in Vitebsk.

In 1996 he graduated Faculty of Art and Graphic Design of Vitebsk State University.

In 2007, he obtained a degree from the Presidential Academy of Public Administration.

== Career ==
Vladimir Pertsov began his career in television in 1993, working as an author and TV host at the Vitebsk TV station. He advanced to editor in 1995, and by 1999, he was appointed chief editor for radio.

In 2002, Pertsov relocated to Grodno to lead its local television and radio operations. His then moved to national broadcasting when, in 2008, he was appointed Director of Broadcasting for the newly established Russia-Belarus channel, which had replaced the Russia-1 channel. In 2010, he took on the role of Director for the Minsk office of the Russian broadcaster, Mir.

In 2021, he was appointed Minister of Information. He took position of deputy head of the Presidential Administration in 2024, and was promoted to first deputy head in 2025.

== Views ==
He stated that Poland and the Baltic states are the primary proponents of sanctions against Belarus, arguing that these measures cause more harm to the European Union than to Belarus itself.

In 2020, he stated that Belarus was one of the last "democratic states" that had not regulated social media.

== Sanctions ==
He is under sanctions of Lithuania, Latvia, Estonia and Canada.

== Personal life ==
Vladimir Pertsov is married to Yulia Pertsova, the daughter of Alexander Radkov, former Minister of Education of Belarus. They have two children.

== Orders and Honors ==
- Order of Friendship (2012, Russia)
- Francysk Skaryna Medal (2013, Belarus)
- Order of Francysk Skaryna (2018, Belarus)
