= Aliaksei Mikhalchanka =

Belarusian journalist

- Russian: Алексей Яковлевич Михальченко
- Born: 13 October 1973 (age 52); Polatsk, Belarusian SSR, Soviet Union
- Occupation: TV presenter
- Years active: from 2004
- Known for: accused of propaganda and included into the sanctions list of the European Union
- Television: ONT
- Title: Presenter
- Term: 2005 - now
- Children: 1

Aliaksei Mikhalchanka (Belarusian: Аляксей Міхальчанка, Russian: Алексей Яковлевич Михальченко - Alexey Mikhalchenko; born October 13, 1973, in Polatsk) is a Belarusian journalist, propagandist and TV presenter.

In 2000, he started his TV career at a regional TV station. Since 2004 he has worked for the state-owned TV channel ONT as a freelance correspondent. In 2005 he moved to Minsk to work at ONT's headquarters.

Mikhalchanka is known as the author of the TV show Kak yest, tak yest (Russian: Как есть, так есть, That is how it is).

In 2011, after the wave of repressions that followed the 2010 presidential election, A. Mikhalchanka and several other employees and top managers of major state media became subject to an EU travel ban and asset freeze as part of a sanctions list of 208 individuals responsible for political repressions, electoral fraud and propaganda in Belarus. In 2014, Mikhalchanka won a trial in the General Court of the European Union and managed to get the sanctions against him cancelled due to procedural reasons. The court, however, reconfirmed that Mikhalchenko's show was part of the propaganda machine of the regime of Alexander Lukashenko.

According to the EU Council's decision, Mikhalchanka's TV show was described as "an instrument of state propaganda on TV, which supports and justifies the repression of the democratic opposition and of civil society. The opposition and civil society are systematically highlighted in a negative and derogatory way using falsified information. He was particularly active in this regard after the crackdown on peaceful demonstrations on 19 December 2010 and on subsequent protests."

In 2012, Aliaksei Mikhalchanka was a candidate in the election for the Lower Chamber of the Belarusian Parliament but lost.

He is married and has a son.

== See also ==
- List of people and organizations sanctioned in relation to human rights violations in Belarus
