= Natalia Petkevich =

Belarusian politician

Natalia Vladimirovna Petkevich
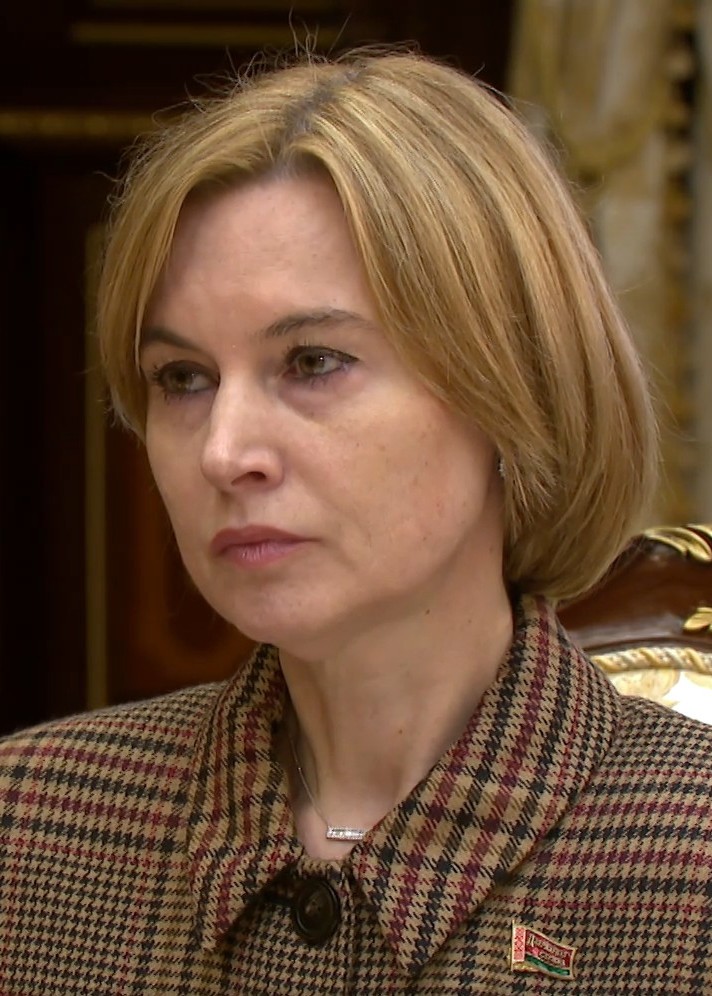
- Natalia Petkevich in 2025

Deputy Prime Minister
- Incumbent
- Assumed office 22 May 2025
- President: Alexander Lukashenko
- Prime Minister: Alexander Turchin

First Deputy Head of the Presidential Administration of Belarus
- In office 27 June 2024 – 22 May 2025
- Preceded by: Maxim Ryzhenkov
- Succeeded by: Vladimir Pertsov
- In office 9 January 2009 – 28 December 2010
- Preceded by: Anatoli Rubinov
- Succeeded by: Alexander Radkov

Personal details
- Born: 24 October 1972 (age 53) Minsk, Byelorussian SSR, Soviet Union
- Party: Independent
- Spouse: Valentin Rybakov
- Education: Belarusian State University

Natalia Vladimirovna Petkevich (Belarusian: Наталля Уладзіміраўна Пяткевіч, romanized: Natallya Uladzimirawna Pyatkevich; Russian: Наталья Владимировна Петкевич, romanized: Natalya Vladimirovna Petkevich; born 24 October 1972) is a Belarusian politician who served formerly as the First Deputy Head of the Administration of the President of Belarus. As of June 27, 2024, she has reprised her role as First Deputy Head of the Belarus President Administration.

== Biography ==
Natalia Petkevich was born in Minsk. In 1994, she graduated from the Faculty of Law of the Belarusian State University. In 1998, she earned the degree of Doctor of Juridical Science. Joining the Administration of the President of Belarus, she came to serve as Chief for the Administration of State and International Law of the Administration of the President of Belarus. In 2001, she was appointed Press Secretary of the President of Belarus. Then, in 2004, she was appointed Deputy Head of the Administration of the President of Belarus. Natalia Petkevich has been called the "Iron Lady" of Belarus, and has been considered a potential successor to President Alexander Lukashenko. In 2009, she was appointed First Deputy Head of the Administration of the President of Belarus. She held this position until 2010. Until 2014 she was Lukashenko’s assistant. On June 27, 2024, Petkevich again became First Deputy Head of the Administration. On 22 May 2025 she was appointed Deputy Prime Minister.

== Sanctions ==
On 10 April 2006, following the 2006 presidential election in Belarus, she was placed on a list of over 40 members of the Belarusian government banned from entering the European Union and the United States for allegedly participating in the manipulation of the results of the presidential election; the ban was temporarily lifted in 2008.

As of 2025, Natalia Petkevich is sanctioned by the European Union and the USA.

== Personal life ==
In 2009, she married Alexander Martinenko, Deputy Chairman of the National State Television and Radio Company of the Republic of Belarus.

Piatkevich's current husband is Valentin Rybakov, Belarus representative to the UN.
