= Vladimir Rusakevich =

Belarusian former politician and diplomat

- Uladzimir Rusakyevich

Belarusian Ambassador of Belarus to China
- In office 21 July 2001 – 6 August 2003
- Preceded by: Vyacheslav Kuznetsov
- Succeeded by: Anatoly Kharlap

Belarusian Minister of Information
- In office September 1990 – November 1993
- Preceded by: Mikhail Podgainy
- Succeeded by: Oleg Proleskovsky

Personal details
- Born: Vladimir Vasilievich Rusakevich; 13 September 1947 (age 78) Vyhanashchy, Ivatsevichy District, Brest Region, Belarus
- Education: He speaks German and Polish.
- Alma mater: In 1970 he graduated from the Faculty of Biology; In 1983 he graduated from the Chemistry of the Grodno Pedagogical Institute of Grodno Agricultural Institute and the Minsk Higher Party School; In 1993 he was decorated with an honorary Doctor of the Brest State University.; In 1994 he was decorated with an honorary Doctor of AS Pushkin; In 1998 he was decorated with a Ph.D.of the International Academy of Information Technology.

Vladimir Vasilievich Rusakevich (Belarusian: Уладзімір Васілевіч Русакевіч, romanized: Uladzimir Vasilyevich Rusakyevich, born 13 September 1947) is a retired Belarusian politician and Ambassador.

- In 1963 he began his career, as the head of the library and teacher in the high school of Hotynitskoy in the Hantsavichy District
- From 1970 to 1971 he was director of a school in the Ivatsevichy District.
- He has held several senior positions in the Komsomol, the party, and was chairman of the executive committee Hantsavichy and Deputy Chairman of the Brest Regional Executive Committee.
- From 1973 to 1994 he was Deputy member of the District, Regional Council.
- From 1990 to 1995 he was member of the Supreme Council of Belarus.
- from March to December 1994 he was member of the commission on the work of the Soviets of People's Deputies and the development of self-government.
- In 1991 he was Deputy Chairman of the Supreme Council.
- From 1994 to 1996 he was Deputy Prime Minister of the Republic of Belarus and supervised culture, education, science, sports, health and social protection.
- From 1997 to 2000 he was deputy head of the Presidential Administration of the Republic of Belarus in charge of personnel management issues.
- From July 2000 to 6 August 2003 he was Ambassador Extraordinary and Plenipotentiary of the Republic of Belarus Beijing (People's Republic of China).
- From 6 August 2003 to 4 December 2009 he was Minister of Information of the Republic of Belarus.

Rusakevich has been on the US sanctions list since 2007. From 2006 to 2008 and again from 2011 to 2013 Rusakevich was also subject to the European Union sanctions.
