= Syarhei Kastsyan =

Belarusian politician (1941–2026)

- Сяргей Касцян

Member of the Supreme Council of Belarus
- In office 9 January 1996 – 9 January 2001

Personal details
- Born: 15 January 1941 Klichaw district, Mogilev Oblast, Byelorussian SSR, Soviet Union
- Died: 21 August 2026 (aged 85)
- Party: CPB
- Education: Chelyabinsk Pedagogical Institute; Maksim Tank Belarusian State Pedagogical University (CS)
- Occupation: Academic

Syarhei Ivanavich Kastsyan (Belarusian: Сяргей Іванавіч Касцян; 15 January 1941 – 21 August 2026) was a Belarusian politician. A member of the Communist Party, he served on the Supreme Council and then on the House of Representatives from 1996 to 2001.

In 2006, Kastsyan was banned from entering the territory of the European Union.

Kastsyan died on 21 August 2026, at the age of 85.
