= Pavel Liohki =

Belarusian statesman, diplomat, and propagandist

- Russian: Павел Николаевич Лёгкий
- Born: 1972 (age 53–54); Baranavichy, Belarusian SSR, Soviet Union
- Occupations: Propagandist, diplomat, statesman
- Known for: accused of propaganda and included into the sanctions lists of Latvia and Estonia

Pavel Liohki (Russian: Павел Николаевич Лёгкий, Belarusian: Павел Мікалаевіч Лёгкі, Lyohki, Lyogki; born 1972 in Baranavichy) is a Belarusian statesman, diplomat and propagandist. Following the 2020 Belarusian protests, he was included in the list of Belarusian officials sanctioned by the Baltic states for participating in the falsification of the 2020 presidential elections, repressions against peaceful protesters and propaganda in Belarus.

== Biography ==
Pavel Liohki graduated from the Minsk Higher Military Command School in 1993 and later worked at the newly established Military Academy of Belarus.

From 1998 till 2003 he worked as a journalist and editor of a magazine of the Belarusian military and later briefly as a journalist of the Belarusian state TV channel, ONT.

In 2003 Liohki was appointed head of the press office of the Belarusian authoritarian president Alexander Lukashenko. In particular, Liohki has been one of the spokespersons of the authoritarian regime of Belarus during the crackdowns of major opposition protests following the controversial presidential elections of 2006 (Jeans Revolution) and 2010 (2011 Belarusian protests).

In 2013 Liohki was appointed Minister-Counsellor at the embassy of Belarus in Russia.

In 2018 he returned to Minsk to work as Deputy Minister of Information.

In 2025, Pavel Liohki was the director of the company "Creative Code", associated with Alexander Lukashenko's daughter-in-law, Anna Seluk.

=== Sanctions after 2020 presidential election ===
In September 2020 Latvia, and Estonia included Pavel Liohki in their lists of sanctioned individuals. Latvia added Liohki to its list of personae non grata, Estonia imposed a 5-years travel ban on him.

On 17 December 2020 Liohki was included in the list of natural and legal persons, entities and bodies subject to restrictive measures of the EU in respect of Belarus, as responsible person for the "repression of civil society, and in particular the Ministry of Information decision to cut off access to independent websites and limit internet access in Belarus in the wake of the 2020 presidential election, as a tool of repression of civil society, peaceful demonstrators and journalists." Albania, Iceland, Lichtenstein, Montenegro, North Macedonia, Norway and Switzerland aligned themselves with these sanctions. Liohki is also banned from entering the United Kingdom since 18 February 2021.

== See also ==
- List of people and organizations sanctioned in relation to human rights violations in Belarus
