= Belarusian Steel Works =

Belarusian steel company

OJSC Belarusian Steel Works
- Type: OJSC
- Industry: Steel
- Founded: 1984
- Headquarters: Zhlobin, Republic of Belarus
- Area served: Worldwide
- Key people: Anatoly Savenok (General Director)
- Products: Steel, metalware, pipe, tube, bloom, rebar, cord, fiber
- Revenue: ▲US$ 1,1 billion (2009)
- Total assets: 5,475,515,000 Belarusian ruble (2021)
- Number of employees: 12,380 (2010)
- Website: www.belsteel.com

OJSC Belarusian Steel Works (Russian: ОАО Белорусский металлургический завод, Belarusian: Беларускі металургічны завод, "БМЗ", BMZ) is a Belarusian company operating in the steel industry, centred in Zhlobin, Gomel Region. The main raw material of the enterprise is scrap. The company's products range from concast square steel billets, hot rolled round & square steel bars, rebars, hot rolled seamless pipe, high carbon wire rod, tyre steel cord, bead wire, hose wire, general purpose wire, to steel fiber. In 2020—2021, the company fired several employees trying to organize a strike during protests in Belarus, three of them were imprisoned.

== History ==
Belarusian Steel Works (BMZ) was constructed in accordance with the USSR Ministers Council decree to provide Belarusian enterprises with the bars in order to utilize local scrap.

The task for the plant working out was confirmed by the USSR Ministry of Ferrous Metallurgy in November 19, 1982. In 1982 there was signed a contract with the Austrian firm Voestalpine for designing and " on key-basis " erecting of the metallurgical plant and all the necessary constructions for the annual output of 500 000 mt bars and 200 000 mt carbon and low alloyed concast billets.

The main sub-contractor was an Italian film Danieli. More than 30 firms of West Germany, Sweden, Italy, Hungary, took part in working out the project, equipment supply and erecting the plant.

At present the plant has a capacity of 1,100,000 mt of steel, 250,000 mt of structural rolled product and 500,000 mt of bars. The major items of production consist of rebar, billet, channel, wire rod and cold heading wire rod. More than 50 alloyed and low-alloyed structural and carbon steel grades are produced by the plant. Two steel cord shops produce 50,000 mt of steel cord, 10,000 mt of brass bead wire and 10,000 mt of hose wire annually. Basic funds cost of the plant is 1,700,000,000 rubles.

The pace of investment growth in 2011 at the BMZ in 2010 decreased significantly. First Deputy Prime Minister of Belarus Vladimir Semashko criticized the Belarusian Steel Works, which had failed to implement any large-scale investment projects for the last three years.

== Mismanagement and financial problems ==
In July 2011 the Committee for State Security (KGB) had arrested BMZ former Director General Mikalay Andryyanaw; Alyaksey Nikifaraw, the active deputy director general in charge of economy and finance; and an aide to the director general.

According to some sources of information, the arrests were made after Alexander Lukashenko's meeting with BMZ Director General Mikhail Savyanok. “It is most likely that Savyanok shifted the blame for BMZ’s economic problems onto the preceding management,” the report said, noting that KGB chief Vadim Zaitsev had been present at Lukashenko’s meeting with the BMZ director general.

In July 2011 Belarusian Steel Works (BMZ) released a statement to deny reports that the company has been struggling to meet government-set performance targets. In the statement, the steel giant says that in the first half of this year its output increased year-on-year by 5.5 percent to 1,281,952 tons. The company's fixed capital expenditures topped 90 billion rubles, while a target of 64 billion rubles had been set. The profitability of sales totalled 12 percent, and exports exceeded imports by $272 million.

In January 2012 the Belarusian Steel Works was reorganized into a joint stock company.

In early 2021, Nasha Niva newspaper claimed that BMZ is close to default. According to Nasha Niva, in 2021 BMZ transferred part of his debt to the Ministry of finance, which simultaneously issued foreign currency bonds worth 619 million USD. These measures were taken non-publicly by a decree of Alexander Lukashenko, being not published to public.

== Political repressions, labour rights issues ==
During the 2020 Belarusian protests it was reported that the workers of the factory announced in a statement to the management that "in the eventuality of unfair elections, the workers will strike on August 10, 11 and 12", after which a part of the factory went on strike. Reportedly, riot police soon arrived at the plant. This was denied by the state-controlled Belta news agency.

On 1 February 2021, Zhlobin local court sentenced three BMZ employees to 3 and 2.5 years of prison. These employees were convicted under article 342 of the Criminal Code of Belarus ("Organizing illegal group actions that grossly violate public order and disobey the legal requirements of the government officials"). They were also fined 1088 BYN (~400 USD) of material damage to BMZ for stopping the steel smelting by the induction furnaces. A fourth striker managed to left Belarus and was declared wanted by Belarusian authorities. Two of the imprisoned workers were later recognized as political prisoners by Belarusian human rights activists. At least two other employees were fired immediately after declaring participation in a strike. In January 2021, two employees of BMZ were fired after trying to create an independent trade union branch on the factory.

In June 2021, Sweden's Scandia Steel was reported to cut cooperation with BMZ due to labour rights violations. Michelin, another international business partner of BMZ, ordered an independent audit of labour rights at BMZ.

== International sanctions ==
In May 2023, the BMZ was blacklisted by Ukraine.

In August 2023, the company was added to the sanctions list of the European Union. In the same month, Switzerland, North Macedonia, Montenegro, Albania, Ukraine, Bosnia and Herzegovina, Iceland, Liechtenstein and Norway joined these sanctions. Also since August 2023, BMZ, the general director of the plant, Dmitry Korchik, and the company associated with the plant, BEL-KAP-STEEL, are on the US sanctions list.

At the end of 2023, several journalistic investigations were published about the circumvention of the EU and US sanctions against the BMZ.

In January 2025, Canada joined the sanctions against the BMZ.

== Production Union "Belarusian steel works" ==
Production Union "Belarusian Steel Works" was organized in 2006 by decree of the Ministry of Industry. It includes these companies:

- OJSC Mogilev Metallurgical works
- JSC Rechytsa Metizny Plant

== International offices ==
Outside of Belarus, the interests of BMZ are represented by 8 joint ventures in Germany, Austria, United States, China, Lithuania, Czech Republic and Russia:

- Belastahl Außenhandel GmbH
- BELMET Handelsgesellschaft mbH
- Bel–Kap–Steel LLC
- Belmet (Shanghai) Trading Co., Ltd
- OOO Torgovyi dom BMZ, Russia, St. Petersburg
- OOO Torgovyi dom BMZ, Russia, Moscow
- ZAO Torgovyi dom BMZ - Baltiya
- BMZ Polska Sp. z o.o., Czech Branch
