= Igor Lutsky =

Belarusian politician (born 1972)

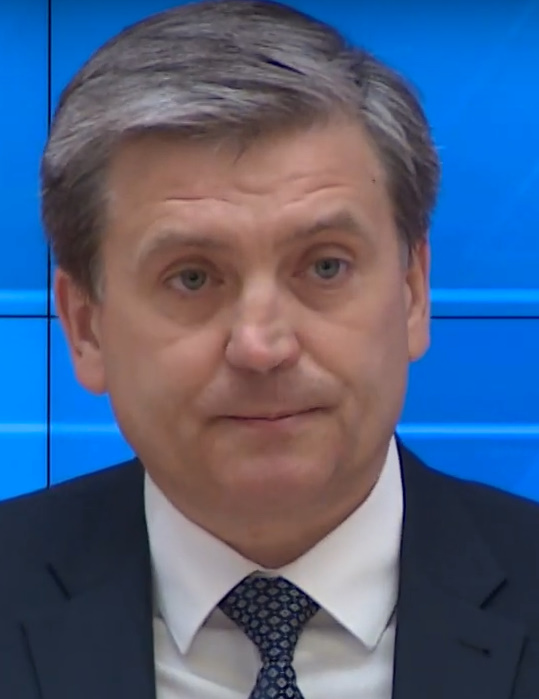
- Lutsky in 2020

Minister of Information
- In office 4 June 2020 – 5 April 2021
- President: Alexander Lukashenko
- Prime Minister: Roman Golovchenko
- Preceded by: Aliaksandr Karliukievič
- Succeeded by: Vladimir Pertsov

Personal details
- Born: 1972 (age 53–54) Stolin, Byelorussian SSR, Soviet Union

Igor Vladimirovich Lutsky (Russian: И́горь Влади́мирович Лу́цкий; Belarusian: І́гар Уладзі́міравіч Лу́цкі; born 1972 in Stolin) is a Belarusian politician serving as chairman of All-National TV since 2024. From 2020 to 2021, he served as minister of information. From 2021 to 2024, he served as deputy head of the Presidential Administration.
