= Vitebsk State University =

Public university in Vitebsk, Belarus

Coordinates: 55°10′39″N 30°13′32″E

University rankings

Regional – Overall
- QS Emerging Europe and Central Asia: 251-300 (2022)

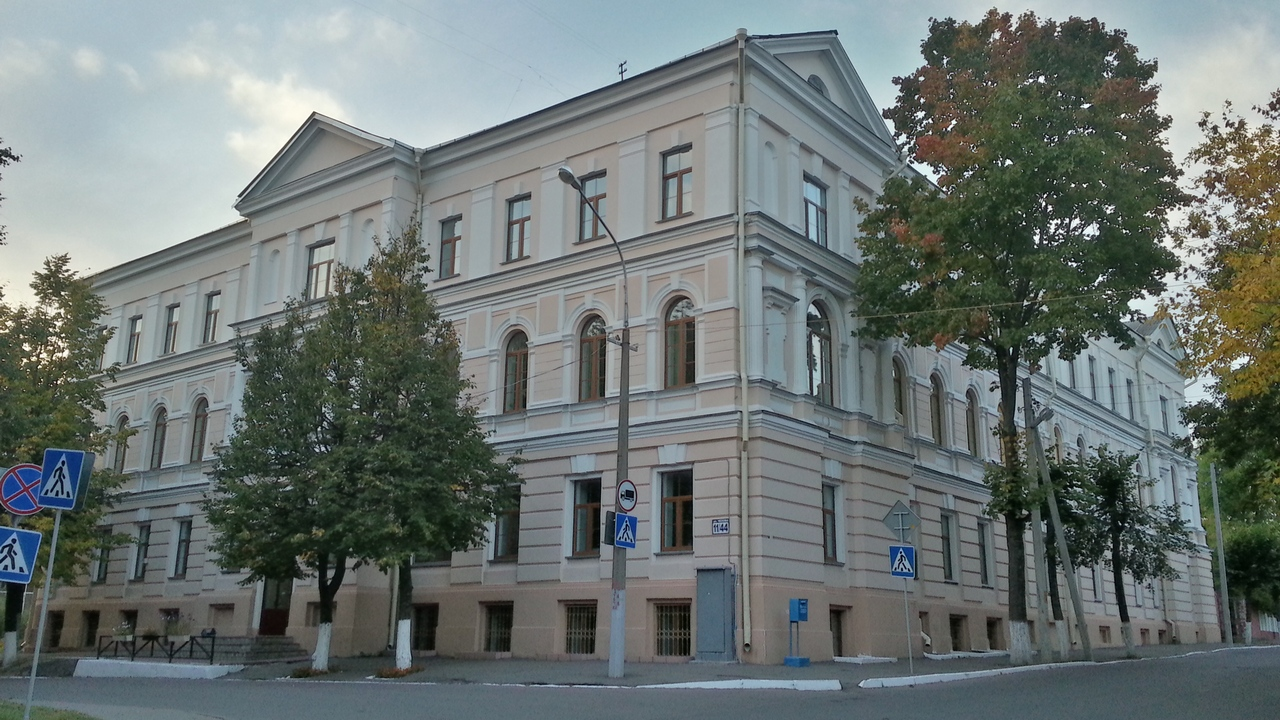
Vitebsk State University

P. M. Masherov Vitebsk State University, commonly known simply as Vitebsk State University, is a public university in Vitebsk, Belarus.
