= Oleg Proleskovsky =

Belarusian politician

Oleg Prolsekovsky

Minister of Information of Belarus
- In office 2009–2014
- President: Alexander Lukashenko

Personal details
- Born: 1963 (age 62–63) Zagorsk, RSFSR, Soviet Union
- Party: Independent
- Education: Air Defense and Rocket School of the Air Defence Forces

Oleg Vitoldovich Proleskovsky (Belarusian: Алег Вітальдавіч Праляскоўскі Aleg Vitaldavich Pralyaskovski; Russian: Олег Витольдович Пролесковский Oleg Vitoldovich Proleskovskiy; born 1 October 1963) is a Belarusian politician who was the Minister of Information of Belarus.

== Biography ==
O. Proleskovsky was born into a working-class family in Zagorsk (now Sergiev Posad) in the RSFSR. In 1985, he graduated from the Minsk Air Defense and Rocket School of the Air Defence Forces. In 1998, he graduated from the Faculty of Law of the Belarusian State University. He served in the Soviet Army in East Germany. He held different posts in the Military Academy of Belarus in Minsk from 1990 through 2002.

He headed the Analytical Division of the KGB of Belarus and was the Director-General of the Belarusian Telegraph Agency. He was appointed Deputy Head of the Administration of the President in 2003, a post he held until 2007. He was the chief of the main ideological administration of the president of Belarus from 2007 to 2008. He was appointed the director of the Information-Analytical Center of the administration of the president of Belarus in 2008, a post he held until 4 December 2009, when he was appointed Minister of Information of Belarus.

== EU sanctions ==
In 2011, after the wave of repressions that followed the 2010 presidential election, Oleg Proleskovsky became subject to an EU travel ban and asset freeze as part of a sanctions list of 208 individuals responsible for political repressions, electoral fraud and propaganda in Belarus. The sanctions were lifted in 2016.

According to the EU Council's decision, Proleskovsky "has been one of the main sources and voices of state propaganda and ideological support for the regime. He has been promoted to the position of Minister, and has since continued to be a vocal propagandist and supporter of the acts of the regime towards the democratic opposition and civil society."

== Personal life ==
Oleg Proleskovsky is married, and has two daughters.
