= Belaruskali =

Belarusian state-owned fertilizer company

JSC Belaruskali
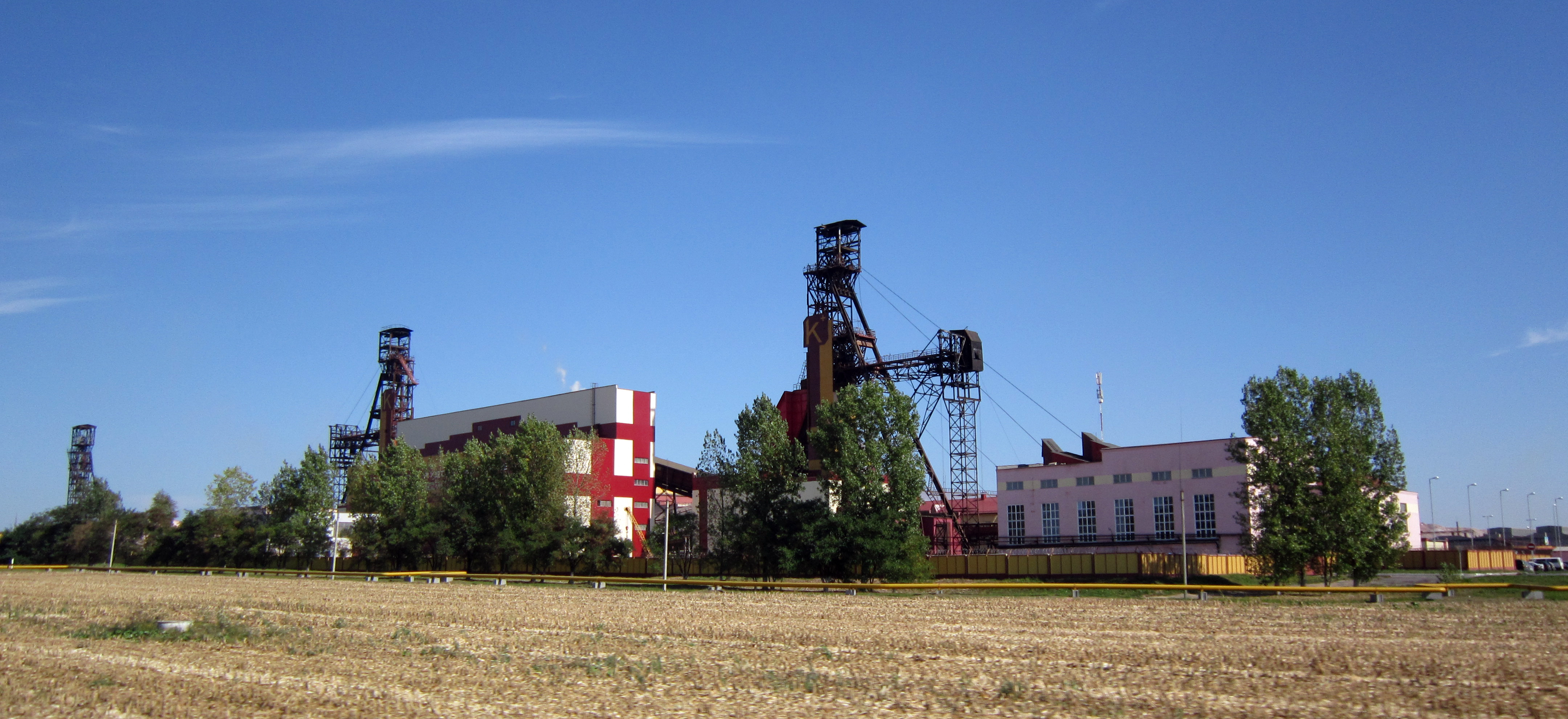
- Potassium mine in Salihorsk
- Industry: Chemical
- Founded: 1958
- Founder: Council of Ministers of the Byelorussian SSR
- Headquarters: Salihorsk, Minsk Region, Belarus
- Key people: Andrei Rybakov (CEO)
- Products: Potash fertilizers
- Revenue: 4,797,196,750 Belarusian ruble (2019)
- Operating income: 1,146,328,610 Belarusian ruble (2019)
- Net income: 937,517,910 Belarusian ruble (2019)
- Total assets: 9,050,012,000 Belarusian ruble (2019)
- Number of employees: 16,000
- Website: www.belaruskali.by

Belaruskali (Belarusian: Беларуськалій, Russian: Беларуськалий) is one of the largest state-owned companies of Belarus. It is one of the largest producers of potash fertilizers in the world, accounting for 20% global supply as of 2019.

Belaruskali is the largest single taxpayer in Belarus and an important source of foreign currency of the Belarusian government. As of 2015, it accounted for 11% of tax revenues of Minsk Region.

Most of Belaruskali's production is exported to China.

== History ==
The company was established in 1958 and comprises four production units, as well as auxiliary shops and service departments. The Belarusian Potash Company is the main distributor of potash fertilizers produced by Belaruskali.

== Worker rights issues and political repressions ==
In 2020, four thousand workers of Belaruskali have declared a strike as part of mass peaceful nationwide protests that followed a controversial presidential election, demanding resignation of Alexander Lukashenko and new democratic elections. There have been cases of miners cuffing themselves underground as part of the strike.

According to reports, Belaruskali management threatened and put psychological pressure on the strikers. Belaruskali paid extra bonuses to workers not participating in the strike.

The Belarusian authorities arrested and imposed 15-day prison sentences on some of the striking workers at Belaruskali. Four activists of the Belaruskali labour union - Siarhei Charkasau, Pavel Puchenia, Yury Korzun and Anatol Bokun - were arrested after the strike began. 49 Belaruskali workers were fired for participating in the strike, several had to flee from the country.

The arrested activists were later released following an international solidarity campaign, fired workers were reinstated following inquiries from Yara International, the largest trader of Belaruskali's products, regarding worker rights violations at Belaruskali.

== International sanctions ==
In 2020, Belaruskali became one of the centers of strikes after the presidential election and violence against protesters. On November 19, Belaruskali fired 49 striking workers, purportedly for absenteeism.

On 24 June 2021, the European Union has introduced restrictions on potash trade with Belarus as a reaction to "the escalation of serious human rights violations in Belarus and the violent repression of civil society, democratic opposition and journalists, as well as to the forced landing of a Ryanair flight in Minsk on 23 May 2021 and the related detention of journalist Raman Pratasevich and Sofia Sapega."

On 9 August 2021, the United States have added Belaruskali to the Specially Designated Nationals and Blocked Persons List, while United Kingdom and Canada have imposed restrictions on potash trade with Belarus. In a statement by the U.S. Treasury, Belaruskali is described as "a major source of tax revenue and foreign currency for the Lukashenka regime".

On 2 December 2021, Belaruskali was added to the sanctions list of the United Kingdom, while the Belarusian Potash Company was added to the SDN List by the United States Department of the Treasury.

In 2022, Canada, the EU and Switzerland imposed sanctions against Belaruskali, its CEO Ivan Golovaty, and the Belarusian Potash Company. In January 2023, the enterprise was included in the sanctions list of Ukraine. In September 2024, the Court of Justice of the European Union refused to lift the EU sanctions against Golovaty, Belaruskali and the Belarusian Potash Company.

In August 2024, an investigation was published by the Belarusian Investigative Center, Belsat, the Ukrainian service of Radio Liberty, Cyber Partisans and OCCRP, according to which a company registered in Cyprus and associated with Viktor Sheiman’s circle was used to circumvent sanctions against Belaruskali.

In November 2024, Andrei Rybakov, who previously headed Belneftekhim, became the new CEO of Belaruskali. In December 2024, Rybakov was added to the sanctions lists of the European Union and Switzerland.

According to a new investigation by the Belarusian Investigative Center, released in March 2025, technical salt produced by Belaruskali is sold in the EU as an anti-icing agent despite sanctions.
