= Operations and Analysis Center under the President of the Republic of Belarus =

The Operations and Analysis Center under the Aegis of the President of the Republic of Belarus
- Оперативно-аналитический центр при Президенте Республики Беларусь
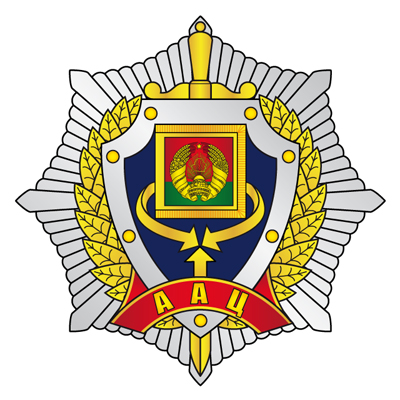

Agency overview
- Formed: 21 April 2008
- Jurisdiction: President of Belarus
- Headquarters: 49 Kirova Street, Minsk, 220030
- Agency executives: Andrei Yuryevich Pavlyuchenko, Head; Sergei Vasilyevich Zhernosek, Deputy Head; Aleksandr Sergeyevich Ivkin, Deputy Head
- Website: oac.gov.by

The Operations and Analysis Center under the Aegis of the President of the Republic of Belarus (Russian: Оперативно-аналитический центр при Президенте Республики Беларусь) is a government agency in charge of regulating the protection of classified information, including state secrets of the Republic of Belarus or other information, which is protected in line with the legislation, against leakage by technical channels, against unsanctioned and unintended actions.

== Operation ==
The OAC comprises at least three divisions: the National Center for Digital Services, the National Center for Data Peering, and Belarusian Cloud Technologies, LLC (TM beCloud).

Among other things the OAC operation involves preventing DOS/DDOS attacks against websites, offering a cloud computing service in Belarus to enable information interoperability between government agencies and the operation of the digital government, nominating primary national ISPs, which can connect to foreign networks, verifying the suitability of equipment required for digital interactive games.

== History ==
On 18 December 1973, the USSR State Technical Commission was set up to organize and carry out work to protect information by engineering and technical methods in the defense industry. It was headquartered in Moscow, with regional branches reporting to the central agency. Each regional branch was assigned an area of responsibility including defense enterprises and organizations located in several oblasts or republics.

In July 1979, the Minsk Regional Inspection for Complex Technical Control was founded. The Minsk Special Center of the USSR State Technical Commission was set up on the premises of the regional inspection in August 1989.

During the establishment of statehood in Belarus the country's leadership took measures to secure information protection in all spheres of activities of the state for the sake of ensuring the national security.

On 12 January 1993, by the resolution of the government the Minsk Special Center of the USSR State Technical Commission was reorganized into the State Center for Information Security under the Defense Ministry of the Republic of Belarus. The new body was tasked with ensuring the protection of classified data by technical means in government agencies, at enterprises, in institutions and organizations during the research, development, manufacturing, and operation of armaments, military hardware, automated control systems, electronic computing machines used for the defense and security of the country. In October 1994, by the relevant decree of the President of the Republic of Belarus control over the State Center for Information Security was transferred to the Security Council of the Republic of Belarus.

In November 2000, the State Center for Information Security under the Security Council of the Republic of Belarus was converted into the State Center for Information Security under the President of the Republic of Belarus. On 21 April 2008, in line with the relevant presidential decree the State Center for Information Security was converted into The Operational and Analytical Center under the Aegis of the President of the Republic of Belarus (OAC).
