= GomSelMash =

Farm equipment manufacturer in Gomel, Belarus

- Industry: Agricultural engineering
- Founded: 1930
- Headquarters: Republic of Belarus, Gomel, St. Highway, 41.
- Products: Agricultural machinery
- Number of employees: 8,010 (2019)
- Divisions: GZLIN, Lidagroprommash
- Website: https://www.gomselmash.by/

Gomselmash (trade name — Open Joint Stock Company "Gomselmash") is a Belarusian manufacturer of agricultural machinery based in Gomel.

== History ==
The construction of an agricultural machinery plant in Gomel began in 1928. October 15, 1930, is considered the birthday of the Gomselmash plant, when the foundry produced the first melt. The plant's reaching its design capacity and its successful operation in the 1930s allowed the USSR to completely abandon the import of dozens of types of machines for fodder production, grain farming, flax and hemp growing, primary processing of bast crops — now Gomselmash provided agricultural producers with such machines. In 1940, 18 out of 26 Gomselmash products were included in Soviet exports.

In May 2023, Ukraine imposed sanctions against GomSelMash and the Gomel Plant of Casting and Normals, its subsidiary. In August 2024, GomSelMash was added to the sanctions list of Canada.

== CEOs over the years ==
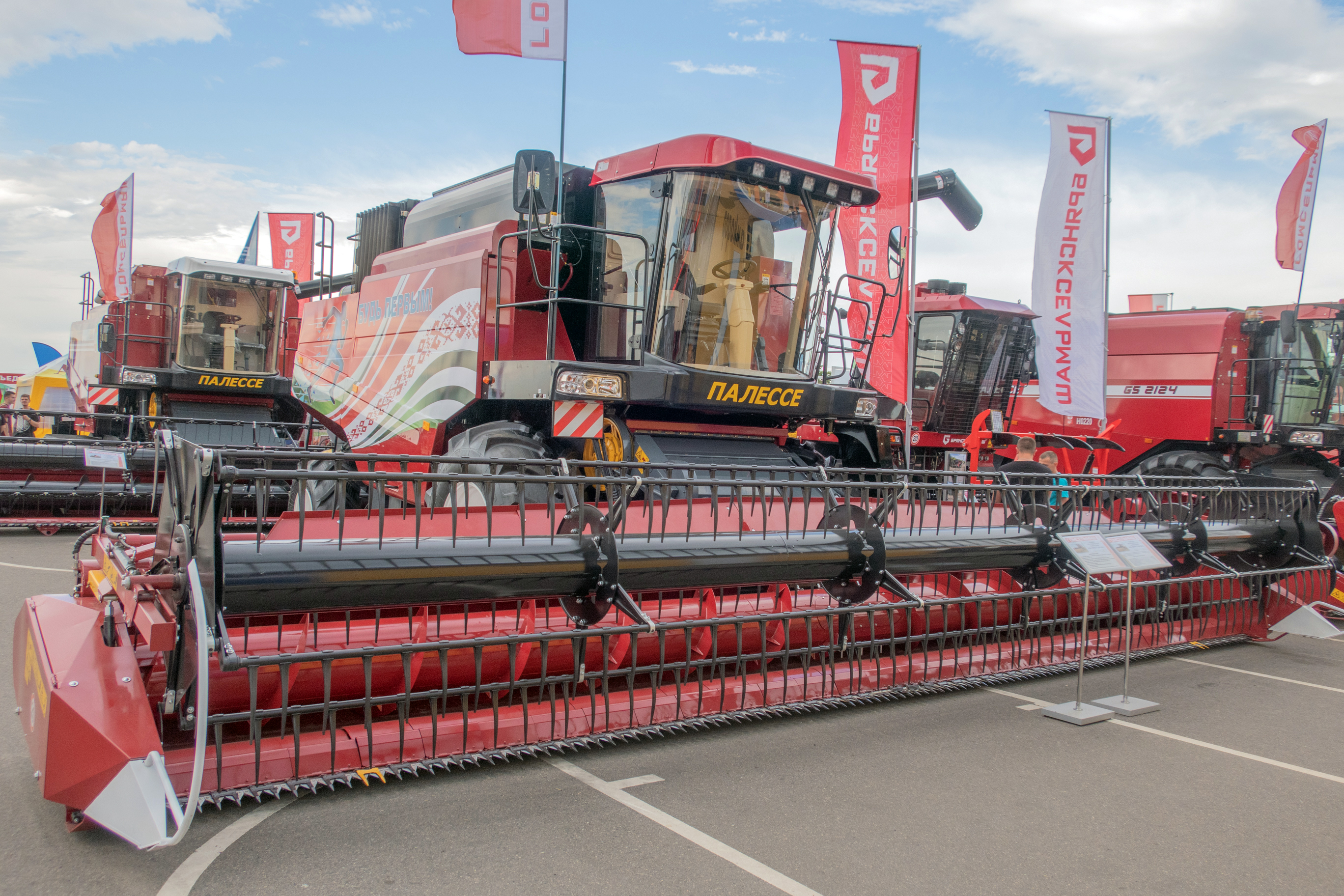
Gomselmash Palesse GS12A1 harvester

- 1930-1933 Ya. Ya. Ambrazhunas
- 1933-1943 A. K. Genkin
- 1943-1944 V. T. Serikov
- 1944-1946 T. I. Yakovlev
- 1946-1955 A. Ya. Bykov
- 1955-1956 A. A. Safronov
- 1956-1960 F. N. Denisov
- 1960-1972 I.P. Kitten
- 1972-1987 N. I. Afanasiev
- 1987-1992 S. S. Drozd
- 1992-1995 S. I. Prokopenko
- 1995-2012 Zhmaylik Valery Alekseevich
- 2012-2019 Kamko Alexander Ivanovich
- Since 2019 Alexander Novikov

== Awards ==
- Order of Lenin (1971)
- Order of the Red Banner of Labor (1980)
- Medal "In connection with the 30th anniversary of the Slovak People's Uprising and the May Uprising of the Czech People" (Czechoslovakia, 1975)
- Honorary Diplomas of the Parliament of the Republic of Belarus
- Prizes of the Government of the Republic of Belarus in the field of quality (2001, 2004, 2007, 2012)
- Prizes of the Ministry of Industry of the Republic of Belarus in the field of quality (2006, 2009, 2013)
- Diploma winner of the Commonwealth of Independent States Prize for achievements in the field of product and service quality (2009)
- Laureate of the CIS Prize for achievements in the field of quality (2013)
