= Vladimir Peftiev =

Belarusian businessman

Vladimir Pavlovich Peftiev
- Владимир Павлович Пефтиев
- Born: 1 July 1957 (age 68); Berdyansk, Ukrainian SSR
- Citizenship: Belarus
- Occupations: Businessman, philanthropist, author

Vladimir Pavlovich Peftiev (Belarusian: Уладзiмiр Паўлавiч Пефцiеў; Russian: Владимир Павлович Пефтиев, born 1 July 1957) is a Belarusian businessman, philanthropist and author.

== Biography ==
Vladimir Pavlovich Peftiev was born on 1 July 1957 in the city of Berdyansk, Ukraine.

== Business ==
Peftiev was co-owner of BelTechExport, a Belarusian arms and military equipment exporter. As of 2012, Peftiev sold his holdings in BelTechExport and "completely ceased his participation in this group of companies".

He owned BT Telecommunications, investment and construction agent.

Peftiev also co-owned Sport-Pari, an interactive lotteries operator. Another co-owner of Sport-Pari through one of his companies is Max Mirnyi, Belarusian tennis player and olympic champion.

Peftiev was a minority shareholder of GSM operator "velcom". "velcom" was subsequently sold to A1 Telekom Austria Group and rebranded as A1.

== Controversies, criticism ==
=== EU sanctions ===
In 2011, after controversial 2010 presidential election in Belarus, the Council of the European Union listed Peftiev and his companies "BelTechExport", "Sport-Pari" and "BT Telecommunications" as sanctioned entities. In the Council's decision, Peftiev has been described as a "person associated with President Lukashenko and his family, chief economic advisor of President Lukashenko and key financial sponsor of the Lukashenko regime".

Peftiev brought action against the Council in the General Court of the European Union.

The team that defended Vladimir Peftiev in court included specialists in the field of human rights, including professor of Yale University and former President of the Inter-American Commission on Human Rights Michael Reisman, and former Director of International Law department of University of Bonn professor Rudolf Dolzer.

According to The Times, The European Court of Justice annulled sanctions against Mr Peftiev in 2014, after finding that the EU council had adduced no specific evidence to support its allegation that he was a key financial supporter of President Lukashenko, and as a result of that ruling the sanctions are deemed never to have existed.

The General Court of European Union decided in Peftiev's and his companies’ favour on 9 December 2014, annulling the sanctions and ruling that the Council of the European Union and European Commission failed to prove their assertions of Peftiev's links to Lukashenko.

The General Court's judgment of 9 December 2014 concerning Peftiev's company reads the following, deeming the sanctions to have never existed (clause 149):

...the Court held that [sanctions involving Belarus] should be annulled in so far as they concern Mr Peftiev. By virtue of that annulling judgment, the annulled acts, in so far as they concern Mr Peftiev, are deleted retroactively from the legal order and deemed never to have existed ... and consequently Mr Peftiev is deemed never to have been listed.

Situation with sanctions against Peftiev was referenced by professor Rudolf Dolzer in his interview on May 8, 2018, to Latvian newspaper “Dienas bizness”, in which he pointed out to the false information in the Internet that was used against Vladimir Peftiev, and namely baseless accusations regarding illegal incomes of Mr. Peftiev and illicit arms trade.

This decision of European General Court was left unattended by mass media. Moreover, various sources continued to publish disproved information that originated before or during sanctions, instead of deleting it from their servers according to the court's decision. This was described by Professor Rudolf Dolzer in his article «Weeding Out Fake Journalism» for 10th issue of Forbes Georgia:

Notwithstanding this clear decision, published in 2014, many concerned Internet sources, including respected data information providers, have decided, for whatever reason, to ignore the highest European Court, and still today, in 2018, have on their servers the outdated, discredited information. Another aspect of fake news has come out. A portion of the media ignored the judgment of the European Court of Justice in favor of Mr. Peftiev, even though the original fake news underlying the sanctions had been published in virtually all media. While fake news was considered newsworthy, its refutation by the court went unnoticed by the same media.

=== Canadian sanctions ===
In 2022, Peftiev was blacklisted by Canada.

=== Offshores ===
Peftiev was mentioned in the Bahamas offshore leaks in 2016: allegedly, he held three companies in Bahamas through an intermediary.

In 2020, an investigation by The Times and Transparency Networks found that Peftiev's family owned 12 flats in London, with a total worth around £18 million. This portfolio was purchased through a number of offshore companies. Peftiev's family were not under sanctions and the purchases did not breach sanctions.

== Science and technology ==
Peftiev has contributed to research and development of a number of new technologies in various fields, with multiple patents issued to his name. In his work, Peftiev has cooperated with Belarusian scientists such as Vladimir Alexandrovich Katko and Sergey Vladimirovich Pletnev.

== Philanthropy ==
=== Sport ===
Peftiev actively sponsored various sports projects in Belarus. He managed and supported creation of tennis club responsible for training young Belarusian players, among which were Olga Govortsova and Ekaterina Dzehalevich. Peftiev was the main sponsor of Victoria Azarenka, Olympic tennis champion and former world No. 1, at the beginning of her career.

From 2009 to 2012, Peftiev headed the Belarus Tennis Federation. Max Mirnyi, former No. 1 player in the ATP Doubles Rankings, expressed his gratitude to Peftiev's work as a CEO of Belarus Tennis Federation.

=== Religious heritage ===
Peftiev's contributions to the preservation of Orthodox Christian heritage have been recognised with awards from the Belarusian Orthodox Church. He was a leading sponsor of the Nikolsky Orthodox Church in Tonezh (completed 2015), built to commemorate the site of a Nazi atrocity.

=== History and the arts ===
Peftiev has sponsored and in some cases co-authored a number of art and historical publications, mainly in the historical series "В поисках утраченного" ("In Search of the Lost") by Belarusian historian Vladimir Lihodedov, volumes of which include:

- "Tadeusz Kosciuszko In Old Postcards And Drawings"
- "Belarus through the camera lens of the German soldier", on the period during WWI when part of modern Belarus was occupied by German troops
- "Adam Mickiewicz", on the poet and patriot of Belarus, Poland and Lithuania
- "Aleksander Nevsky", on the Orthodox churches built in European countries in honor of the Russian saint-prince
- "State Bank of the Russian Empire in postcards, late 19th-early 20th centuries"
- "Monuments dedicated to the Patriotic War of 1812"

Peftiev co-authored the following:

- "1812: Chronicles of the Patriotic War in Old Postcards and Drawings", a commemoration of the two-hundredth anniversary of the Russian Campaign of Napoleon I and the Russian Patriotic War of 1812
- "Equal-to-the-Apostles Duke Vladimir", a work on Vladimir the Great and his impact on Slavic culture

In 2017, a book of maxims by Vladimir Peftiev titled "Maxims of a Man of Schemes" was published with a foreword by the British philosopher and author A. C. Grayling.

Another book authored by Peftiev was published in 2020 and is titled "Quotations From Stories Yet To Be Written", with a foreword by a British author Adam Roberts.

In 2012, an exhibition titled "2012. War and Peace" featuring Peftiev's private historic and art collection was opened in Belarusian State Museum of the History of the Great Patriotic War.
