= Mikalay Charhinets =

Belarusian politician (1937–2026)

- Мікалай Чаргінец; Николай Чергинец
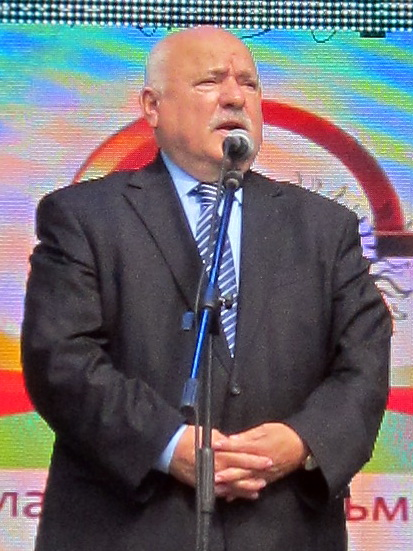
- Charhinets in 2014

Member of the Council of the Republic of Belarus
- In office 13 January 1997 – 31 October 2008

Personal details
- Born: Mikalay Ivanovich Charhinets; 17 October 1937 Minsk, Byelorussian SSR, Soviet Union
- Died: 7 July 2026 (aged 88) Minsk, Belarus
- Party: CPSU (1963–1991); Independent (1991–2026)
- Education: Belarusian State Institute of Physical Culture; Belarusian State University
- Occupation: Military officer, writer

Mikalay Ivanavich Charhinets (Belarusian: Мікалай Іванавіч Чаргінец; Russian: Николай Иванович Чергинец; 17 October 1937 – 7 July 2026) was a Belarusian politician and Russian-language writer.

In the Soviet era, Charhinets made a career in the police; he also participated in the Soviet–Afghan War from 1984 to 1987. Charhinets served on the Council of the Republic from 1997 to 2008. He was also a member of the Parliamentary Assembly of the Union State.

Charhinets died in Minsk on 7 July 2026, at the age of 88.
