= Anatoli Rubinov =

Belarusian physicist, academician and engineer

Anatoli Mikaelevich Rubinov (Belarusian: Анатоль Мікалаевіч Рубінаў) is a politician from Belarus who served as Speaker of Council of the Republic. In 2015, he stepped down from his post.
