= Ivan Tertel =

Chairman of the KGB of Belarus

- Иван Тертель
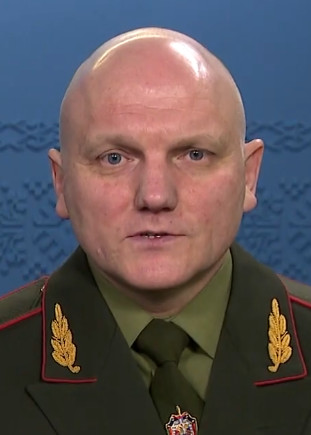
- Tertel in 2021

Chairman of State Security Committee of the Republic of Belarus
- Incumbent
- Assumed office 3 September 2020
- President: Alexander Lukashenko
- Preceded by: Valery Vakulchik

Personal details
- Born: Ivan Stanislavovich Tertel; 8 September 1966 (age 59) Privalka, Grodno Region, Belarusian SSR, Soviet Union

Military service
- Allegiance: Soviet Union; Belarus
- Branch/service: State Security Committee of the Republic of Belarus
- Years of service: 1984–present
- Rank: Lieutenant General

Ivan Stanislavovich Tertel (Russian: Иван Станиславович Тертель; Belarusian: Іван Станіслававіч Тэртэль; Polish: Jan Tertel; born 8 September 1966) is a Belarusian politician. He is the current Chairman of the State Security Committee of the Republic of Belarus.

== Early life ==
He was born on September 8, 1966, in the village of Przywałka (Privalki), Grodno Region to an ethnic Polish family under the name of Jan. There were former Home Army members among his relatives. His father Stanislav Yanovich was a projectionist and his mother Anastasia Kazimirovna worked as a librarian. He is of Catholic background.

He studied at a basic school in Privalki, graduated from high school in Druskininkai.

== Military service ==
Tertel was conscripted by the Soviet Army in 1984, serving in Tula. In 1989, he graduated from the Ryazan Guards Higher Airborne Command School. He studied with Yunus-bek Yevkurov.

In 1994, he graduated from the National Security Institute of the KGB of the Republic of Belarus, and in 1996 from the Yanka Kupala State University of Grodno. In 2017, he graduated from the Academy of Public Administration under the President of the Republic of Belarus .

From 1993 to 2007, he served in the State Border Committee of the Republic of Belarus and held the position of head of the information and analytical group in the 16th border detachment of the border troops.

== Political career ==
Between November 24, 2008, and December 16, 2013, he served as Deputy Chairman of the State Security Committee, responsible for ensuring economic security and combating corruption. From December 16, 2013, to June 4, 2020, he served as Deputy Chairman of the State Security Committee. During this time, he also served as a member of interdepartmental commissions on military-technical cooperation and export control, as well as on security in the economic sphere under the Security Council of Belarus.

On June 4, 2020, he was appointed Chairman of the State Control Committee of the Republic of Belarus. He requested to be dismissed from military service and transferred to the reserve, while retaining the right to wear military uniforms and insignia.

On August 17, 2020, in Novopolotsk, Ivan Tertel attempted to address the striking workers of the Naftan Production Association who were dissatisfied with the results of the 2020 presidential elections in Belarus. However, they did not listen to him and instead began to boo and shout at Tertel, demanding that he leave.

On September 3, 2020, he was relieved of his position as Chairman of the State Control Committee and appointed as Chairman of the State Security Committee of the Republic of Belarus. In October 2020, he was granted the military rank of lieutenant general.

In January 2021, Igor Makar, a former deputy commander of the combat group of the Almaz Special Anti-Terrorism Unit, claimed that Ivan Tertel was involved in developing the plan to assassinate Pavel Sheremet in 2016.

According to French outlet Intelligence Online, Tertel met with a British MI6 delegation in July 2025.

=== Sanctions ===
He has been sanctioned and put under restrictive measures by various countries, including the US, the EU, the UK government, New Zealand, Canada, Ukraine, Australia, and Japan. Much of this has to do with his participation in the 2010 and 2020 protests in Belarus on the side of the state.

== Personal life ==
His son Miroslav studied at the Faculty of International Relations of Belarusian State University.

His brother Yuriy Tertel is the head of the State Inspectorate for the Protection of Animal and Plant Life under the President of the Republic of Belarus, previously was head of the Special Service of Active Activities (ASAM).
