= Dmitry Lukashenko =

Belarusian businessman (born 1980)

- Дмитрий Лукашенко; Дзмітры Лукашэнка
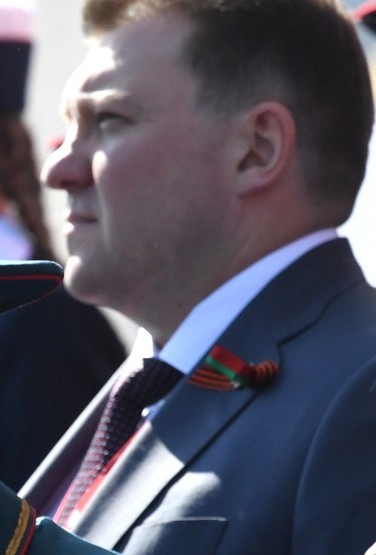
- Lukashenko in 2020
- Born: 23 March 1980 (age 45); Mogilev, Byelorussian SSR, Soviet Union
- Office: Head of the Presidential Sports Club of Belarus
- Spouse: Anna Lukashenko
- Children: 3
- Parents: Alexander Lukashenko (father); Galina Lukashenko (mother)
- Relatives: Viktor Lukashenko (brother); Nikolai Lukashenko (half-brother)

Dmitry Aleksandrovich Lukashenko (Russian: Дмитрий Александрович Лукашенко) or Dzmitry Alyaksandravich Lukashenka (Belarusian: Дзмітры Аляксандравіч Лукашэнка; born 23 March 1980) is a Belarusian businessman. He is the second-oldest son of Alexander Lukashenko, the president of Belarus.

== Early life and education ==
Dmitry Lukashenko was born on 23 March 1980 to Galina Lukashenko and Alexander Lukashenko.

Dmitry Lukashenko graduated from the International Relations faculty of the Belarusian State University. He served in the Border Guard Service of Belarus.

== Career ==
He is the head of the Presidential Sports Club.

Dmitry Lukashenko is an honorary consul of Ethiopia in Belarus.

== International sanctions ==
In 2011, after the wave of repressions that followed the 2010 presidential election in Belarus, Lukashenko became subject to an EU travel ban and asset freeze as part of a sanctions list of 208 individuals responsible for political repressions, electoral fraud and propaganda. In the EU Council's decision, Lukashenko has been described as "Businessman, with active participation in financial operations involving the Lukashenka family.” The sanctions were lifted in 2016.

On 21 June 2021, Dmitry Lukashenko was again banned from entering the European Union. Switzerland joined the sanctions on 7 July.

On December 2, 2021, Dmitry Lukashenko and the Presidential Sports Club were added to the Specially Designated Nationals and Blocked Persons List by the United States Department of the Treasury as well as to the United States Department of State's sanctions. He was also added to the Canadian sanctions list.

In 2022, Dmitry was blacklisted by Japan.

== Personal life ==
Dmitry Lukashenko is married to Anna. According to the Belarusian Investigative Center, in 2018 and 2020, Anna earned about one hundred thousand dollars in the BelAZ Trading House, and the owners of its partner companies are people from Dmitry and Anna Lukashenka's entourage. Anna Lukashenko also writes songs under the pseudonym Anna Sieluk.

== See also ==
- List of people and organizations sanctioned in relation to human rights violations in Belarus
