= Viktor Lukashenko =

Belarusian politician (born 1975)

- Виктор Лукашенко; Віктар Лукашэнка; Viktar Łukašenka
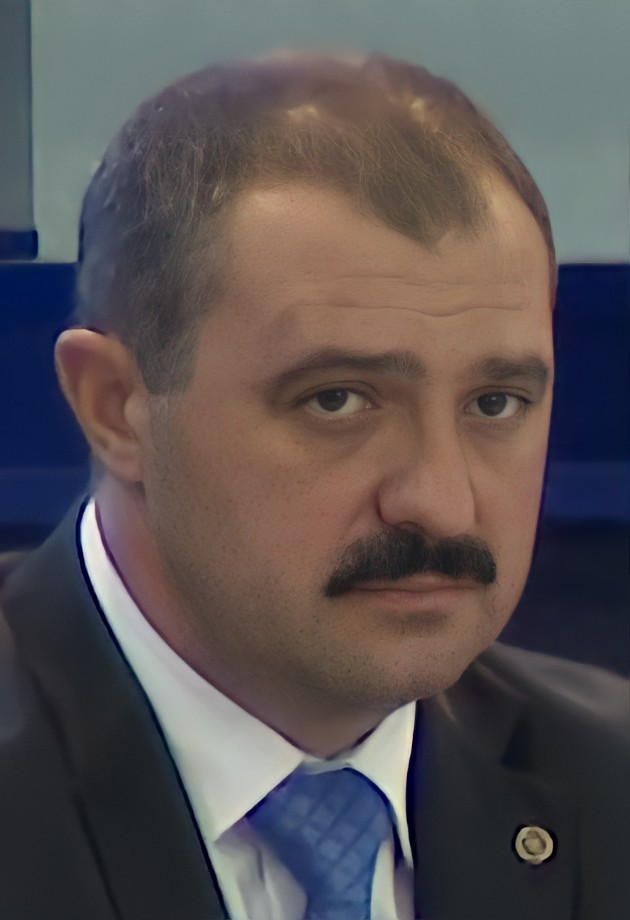
- Lukashenko in 2019

President of the Belarus Olympic Committee
- Incumbent
- Assumed office 26 February 2021
- President: Alexander Lukashenko
- Preceded by: Alexander Lukashenko

Aide to the President of Belarus
- In office 2005 – 26 February 2021
- President: Alexander Lukashenko

Member of the Security Council of Belarus
- In office January 2007 – 26 February 2021
- President: Alexander Lukashenko

Personal details
- Born: 28 November 1975 (age 50) Mogilev, Byelorussian SSR, Soviet Union
- Spouse: Lilya Lukashenko
- Children: 4
- Parents: Alexander Lukashenko (father); Galina Lukashenko (mother)
- Relatives: Dmitry Lukashenko (brother); Nikolai Lukashenko (half-brother)

Viktor Aleksandrovich Lukashenko (Note: Russian: Виктор Александрович Лукашенко, IPA: [vʲˈiktər ɐlʲɪkˈsandrəvʲɪtɕ lʊkɐˈʂɛnkə].) or Viktar Alyaksandravich Lukashenka (Note: Belarusian: Віктар Аляксандравіч Лукашэнка, Lat. Viktar Alaksandravič Łukašenka, IPA: [ˈvʲiktar alʲakˈsandravʲit͡ʂ lukaˈʂɛnka].) (born 28 November 1975) is a Belarusian politician and the eldest son of Belarusian president Alexander Lukashenko. He currently serves as the president of the Belarus Olympic Committee. Previously, he served as a national security advisor to his father.

== Early life and education ==
Viktor Lukashenko was born on 28 November 1975, to Galina Lukashenko, who worked at a kindergarten, and Alexander Lukashenko, President of Belarus since 1994.

Viktor Lukashenko graduated from the International Relations faculty of the Belarusian State University in 1998 and served his mandatory military duty at the Belarusian Border Guard Service between 1998 and 2001.

== Career ==
He worked at the Foreign Ministry of Belarus and at a military exports company, Agat.

In 2005, Viktor Lukashenko became an Assistant on National Security to his father, President Alexander Lukashenko and in January 2007, he became a member of the Security Council of the Republic of Belarus.

Viktor has been linked to Belarusian businessman Alexander Zaytsev, who previously worked as Viktor's aide. Zaytsev was the chairman of the council of Bremino Group which created a special economic zone in Orsha in 2018.

In 2021, Viktor Lukashenko was appointed President of the Belarus Olympic Committee, succeeding his father, after both were banned from attending the Olympic games.

Viktor Lukashenko was also relieved of his post as the Aide to the President for National Security on 1 March.

== Accusations and sanctions ==
In 2011, after the wave of repressions that followed the 2010 presidential election in Belarus, Lukashenko became subject to an EU travel ban and asset freeze as part of a sanctions list of 208 individuals responsible for political repressions, electoral fraud and propaganda. The EU sanctions were lifted in 2016.

According to the EU Council's decision, Lukashenko "has played a key role in the repressive measures implemented against the democratic opposition and civil society. As a key member of the State Security Council, he was responsible for the coordination of repressive measures against the democratic opposition and civil society, in particular in the crackdown of the demonstration on 19 December 2010." Besides that, Lukashenko is on the Specially Designated Nationals and Blocked Persons List of the United States Department of the Treasury.

On 6 November 2020, the Council of the European Union included Viktor Lukashenko in the list of persons and entities subject to restrictive measures set out in Annex I to Regulation (EC) No 765/2006. He was banned from visiting European Union and his assets in EU were frozen. Viktor Lukashenko was also sanctioned by the United Kingdom, and Canada. On 24 November, Iceland, Liechtenstein, Norway, North Macedonia, Montenegro and Albania aligned themselves with the November EU sanctions against 15 Belarusian individuals, while Switzerland did the same on 11 December.

Viktor's wife, Lilya Lukashenko, runs an art gallery, Art Chaos Gallery in Dana Mall, a shopping center in the north of Minsk. Dana Mall is owned by a large construction company, Dana Astra which in turn is said to be owned by Bogoljub Karić and Nebojša Karić, members of the Serbian Karić family. Lilya Lukashenko was listed as a deputy director for Dana Astra 2016–2017. Dana Astra's parent company, Dana Holdings, is the main contractor for one of the biggest development projects in Minsk, called "Minsk-Mir". On 21 June 2021, Lilya Lukashenko was sanctioned by the European Union.

In December 2020 the executive board of the International Olympic Committee (IOC) decided to exclude until further notice all members of the Belarusian Olympic Committee from all IOC events.

In 2022, Viktor Lukashenko was sanctioned by Australia, New Zealand and Japan.

== See also ==
- List of people and organizations sanctioned in relation to human rights violations in Belarus
