= List of universities in Belarus =

In Belarus, higher education establishments can be of the following types: academy, conservatory—specialized universities; classical university; institute; and higher college. They can be either state-owned or privately owned.

The two leading establishments of higher education in the national education system are the Academy of Public Administration under the aegis of the President of the Republic of Belarus (Belarusian: Акадэмiя кiравання пры Прэзiдэнце Рэспублiкi Беларусь) — Minsk and the Belarusian State University (Belarusian: Беларускі дзяржаўны універсітэт) — Minsk.

== Classical universities ==
- Baranavichy State University (Баранавіцкі дзяржаўны універcітэт)
- Belarusian State University (Беларускі дзяржаўны універcітэт) - Минск
- Brest State University named after A.S. Pushkin (Брэсцкі дзяржаўны універсітэт імя А. С. Пушкіна)
- Homiel State (Francysk Skaryna) University (Гомельскі дзяржаўны універсітэт імя Ф. Скарыны)
- Hrodna State (Yanka Kupala) University (Гродзенскі дзяржаўны універсітэт імя Я. Купалы)
- Mogilev State A. Kuleshov University (Магілёўскі дзяржаўны універсітэт імя А. А. Куляшова)
- Palessie State University (Палескі дзяржаўны універсітэт) — Pinsk, Brest Voblast
- Polotsk State University (Полацкі дзяржаўны універсітэт) — Navapolatsk, Vitsebsk Voblast
- Vitsebsk State (P. M. Masherau) University (Віцебскі дзяржаўны універcітэт імя П. М. Машэрава)

== Professional universities ==
=== Agricultural ===
- Belarusian State Agrarian Technical University (Беларускі дзяржаўны аграрны тэхнічны універсітэт) — Minsk
- Grodno State Agrarian University (Гродзенскі дзяржаўны аграрны універсітэт)

=== Economic ===
- Belarusian State Economic University (Беларускі дзяржаўны эканамічны універсітэт) — Minsk
- Minsk Innovation University (Мінскі інавацыйны ўніверсітэт)
- Belarusian Trade-Economic University of Consumer Cooperation (Беларускі гандлёва-эканамічны універсітэт спажывецкай кааперацыі) — Нomiel

=== Medical ===
- Belarusian State Medical University (Беларускі дзяржаўны медыцынскі універсітэт) — Minsk
- Gomel State Medical University
- Grodno State Medical University
- Homiel State Medical University (Гомельскі дзяржаўны медыцынскі універсітэт)
- Hrodna State Medical University (Гродзенскі дзяржаўны медыцынскі універсітэт)
- Vitsebsk State Medical University (Віцебскі дзяржаўны медыцынскі універсітэт)

=== Pedagogic ===
- Belarusian State Pedagogic (Maxim Tank) University (Беларускі дзяржаўны педагагічны універсітэт імя Максіма Танка) — Minsk
- Mаzyr State (I. Shamiakin) Pedagogic University (Мазырскі дзяржаўны педагагічны універсітэт імя І. Шамякіна)
- Mogilev State A.Kuleshov University (Магілёўскі дзяржаўны універсітэт імя А. А. Куляшова)

=== Technical and technological (general) ===
- Belarusian National Technical University (Беларускі нацыянальны тэхнічны універсітэт) — Minsk
- Belarusian State Technological University (Беларускі дзяржаўны тэхналагічны універсітэт) — Minsk
- Belarusian State University of Informatics and Radioelectronics (Беларускі дзяржаўны універсітэт інфарматыкі і радыёэлектронікі) — Minsk
- Brest State Technical University (Брэсцкі дзяржаўны тэхнічны універсітэт)
- Pavel Sukhoi State Technical University of Gomel (Гомельскі дзяржаўны тэхнічны універсітэт імя П. В. Сухога)
- Vitebsk State Technological University (Віцебскі дзяржаўны тэхнічны універсітэт)

=== Other ===
- Belarusian-Russian University (Беларуска-Расійскі універсітэт) — Mahilyow
- Belarusian State Physical Culture University (Беларускі дзяржаўны універсітэт фізічнай культуры) — Minsk
- Belarusian State University of Culture and Arts (Беларускі дзяржаўны універсітэт культуры і мастацтваў) — Minsk
- Belarusian State University of Transport (Беларускі дзяржаўны універсітэт транспарту) — Homiel
- International Sakharov Environmental University (Міжнародны дзяржаўны экалагічны універсітэт імя А. Д. Сахарава) — Minsk
- Mahilyow State Food University (Магілёўскі дзяржаўны універсітэт прадуктаў харчавання)
- Minsk State Linguistic University (Мінскі дзяржаўны лінгвістычны універсітэт)

== Professional academies ==
=== Armed forces ===
- Military Academy of Belarus (Ваенная акадэмія Рэспублікі Беларусь) — Minsk
- Ministry of the Interior Academy of the Republic of Belarus (Акадэмія Міністэрства ўнутраных спраў Рэспублікі Беларусь) — Minsk
- Minsk Suvorov Military School (Мінск Сувораўскае ваеннае вучылішча) - Minsk

=== Arts ===
- Belarusian State Academy of Arts (Беларуская дзяржаўная акадэмія мастацтваў) — Minsk
- Belarusian State Academy of Music (Беларуская дзяржаўная акадэмія музыкі) — Minsk
- Novopolotsk State Musical College (Новополоцкий государственный музыкальный колледж) — Novopolotsk

=== Other ===
- Belarusian State Agricultural Academy (Беларуская дзяржаўная сельскагаспадарчая акадэмія) — Horki, Mahilyow Voblast
- Vitsebsk State Academy of Veterinary Medicine (Віцебская дзяржаўная акадэмія ветэрынарнай медыцыны)

== Institutes ==
=== Economic ===
- Belarusian Commercial Institute of Management (Беларускі камерцыйны інстытут кіравання) — Minsk
- Institute of Entrepreneurial Activity (Інстытут прадпрымальніцкай дзейнасці) — Minsk
- Private Institute of Management and Business (Прыватны інстытут кіравання і прадпрымальніцтва) — Minsk
- Institute of Palimentarism and Business (Інстытут парламентарызму і прадпрымальніцтва) — Minsk
- Mahilyow Financial-Economic (V. P. Kavaliou) Institute (Магілёўскі фінансава-эканамічны інстытут імя В. П. Кавалёва)

=== Emergency control ===
- Emergency Control Ministry Homiel Engineering Institute of the Republic of Belarus (Гомельскі інжынерны інстытут Міністэрства па надзвычайных сітуацыях Рэспублікі Беларусь)
- Emergency Control Ministry Military Engineering Institute of the Republic of Belarus (Камандна-інжынерны інстытут Міністэрства па надзвычайных сітуацыях Рэспублікі Беларусь) — Minsk

=== Social sciences ===
- Belarusian Institute of Law (Беларускі інстытут правазнаўства) — Minsk
- Institute (A. M. Shyrokаu) of Modern Knowledge (Інстытут сучасных ведаў імя А. М. Шырокава) — Minsk
- International Humanities and Economics Institute (Міжнародны гуманітарна-эканамічны інстытут) — Minsk
- International Institute of Labour and Social Relations (Міжнародны інстытут працоўных і сацыяльных адносін) — Minsk
- Private Women's Institute "Envila" (Жаночы інстытут "Энвіла") — Minsk

== Higher colleges ==
- Higher State Communications College (Вышэйшы дзяржаўны каледж сувязі) — Minsk
- Minsk State Higher College of Aviation (Мінскі дзяржаўны вышэйшы авіяцыйны каледж)
- Minsk State Higher Radiotechnical College (Мінскі дзяржаўны вышэйшы радыётэхнічны каледж)

== University in exile ==
- European Humanities University (Еўрапейскі гуманітарны універсітэт) — Vilnius, Lithuania, before 2004 - Minsk
