= Mogilev State A. Kuleshov University =

Public university in Mogilev, Belarus

Coordinates: 53°54′39″N 30°20′24″E

Mogilev State A.A. Kuleshov University
- Магілёўскі дзяржаўны ўніверсітэт імя Аркадзя Куляшова
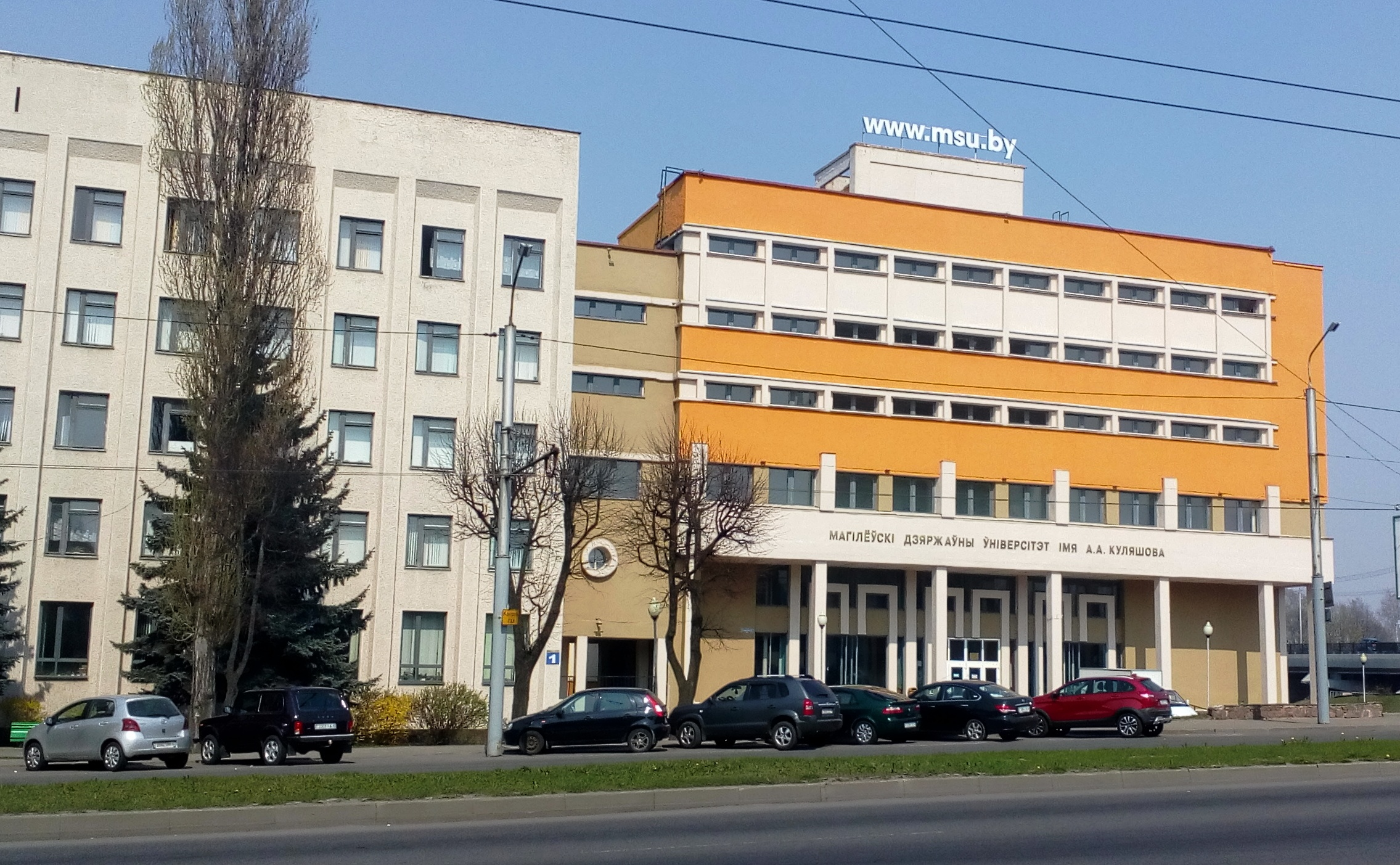
- Type: Public
- Established: 1913; 113 years ago
- Rector: Denis Duk
- Students: 5000
- Undergraduates: 9022
- Postgraduates: 93
- Location: 1 Kosmonavtov str., Mogilev, Belarus
- Website: http://www.msu.by

Mogilev State A. Kuleshov University is a regional educational and scientific centre situated in Mogilev city, Belarus. Mogilev Republic A. Kuleshov University was founded in 1913. The first president of Belarus Alexander Lukashenko was among the graduates of the university, as well as the Heroes of Soviet Union and the Heroes of Socialist Labour, more than 300 Honoured Teachers and outstanding workers of the country's system of education, scientists, writers, state and public figures, sportsmen – The World, Europe, and Olympic champions. Today the university is a scientific, educational and cultural center and provides education for the preparation of professionals and researchers in various scientific fields.

== Administration ==
- Rector: Denis Duk, Doctor of History, professor.
- First pro-rector: Dmitriy Lavrinovich, Doctor of History, professor.
- Pro-rector for education: Oleg Dyachenko, Ph.D. in philosophy, Docent
- Pro-rector for education: Vladimir Yasev, Ph.D. in political science, associate professor
- Pro-rector for scientific work: Natalia Makovskaja, Doctor of Economic Sciences, professor.
- The Head of International Relations Department: Sergei Machekin

== History ==
- 1913, July 1 - a teacher institute was opened in Mogilev
- 1916, 33 teachers graduated for the first time. The school had 8 teachers at the time.
- 1918, December - the teacher's institute was transformed into a pedagogical institute, a higher educational institution with a four-year term of study
- 1923 – the pedagogical institute was temporarily closed
- 1930 – Mogilev State Pedagogical Institute was recreated with two branches in its structure - historical-economic and literary-linguistic.
- 1941-1944 – training at the institute was interrupted by the Great Patriotic War
- 1944 - after the liberation of the city, Mogilev Pedagogical Institute resumed its work
- 1990 – the Faculty of Biology was founded (now - Faculty of Mathematics and Natural Sciences)
- 1997 - Mogilev State Pedagogical Institute named after A. A. Kuleshov was transformed into Mogilev State A.Kuleshov University
- 1998 - The Faculty of Economics and Law and the Faculty of Foreign Languages were opened

== University structure ==
The university includes 7 faculties:

- Mathematics and Natural Sciences
- Foreign Languages
- History and Philology
- Pedagogy and Psychology of Childhood
- Primary and Music Education
- Physical Education
- Economics and Law

== Scientific activity ==
By the Decree of the President of the Republic of Belarus of April 22, 2020 No. 136 “On entering on the Republican Board of Honour of the Winners of the Competition for 2019” among the scientific organizations, Mogilev State A.Kuleshov University was recognized as one of the winners.

The scientific activities of the university in 2019 were carried out in accordance with the Decree of the President of the Republic of Belarus of April 22, 2015 No. 166 “About the Priority Areas of Scientific and Technical Activity in the Republic of Belarus for 2016–2020”, and the List of priority areas for scientific research of the Republic of Belarus for 2016–2020 years, approved by the Decree of the Council of Ministers of the Republic of Belarus No. 190 dated 03/12/2015, and the thematic research plan approved by the University Council on 02/16/2019.

The university is a member of the Association of Universities of the Border Regions of Belarus and Russia, the CSTO University League, the Eurasian Association of Pedagogical Universities. The university publishes the scientific and methodological journal “Bulletin of Mogilev State A.Kuleshov University” and the newspaper “University Bulletin”.

In addition, the university includes:

- Institute for Advanced Studies and Retraining
- Social and Humanitarian College
- Goretsky Pedagogical College

== Allegations of political repression against students ==
According to a report prepared by the Polish Foundation for Freedom and Democracy, Konstantin Bondarenko, rector of the university, expelled students for their political activities.

== Notable alumni ==
- Alexander Lukashenko, the first president of Belarus
- Galina Lukashenko, the First Lady of Belarus
- Alexander Radkov, former Minister of Education and Deputy Head of the Presidential Administration
- Mikhail Zimyanin, Soviet politician and diplomat who served as the editor-in-chief of the newspaper Pravda, the official publication of the Communist Party of the Soviet Union,
- Sergey Novikov, retired Belarusian biathlete
- Svetlana Baitova, Soviet and Belarusian gymnast, Olympic champion in 1988
- Igor Marzaluk, Belarusian historian, archaeologist, ethnographer, teacher. Doctor of Historical Sciences
- Igor Shklyarevsky, Soviet and Russian poet, translator. Laureate of the USSR State Prize

== See also ==
- (in Russian) Могилёвский Государственный Университет имени А.Кулешова
- A List of Modern European University
- List of Universities in Belarus
