= State Security Committee of the Republic of Belarus =

Belarusian national intelligence agency

- Комитет государственной безопасности Республики Беларусь (КГБ), Камітэт дзяржаўнай бяспекі Рэспублікі Беларусь (КДБ)
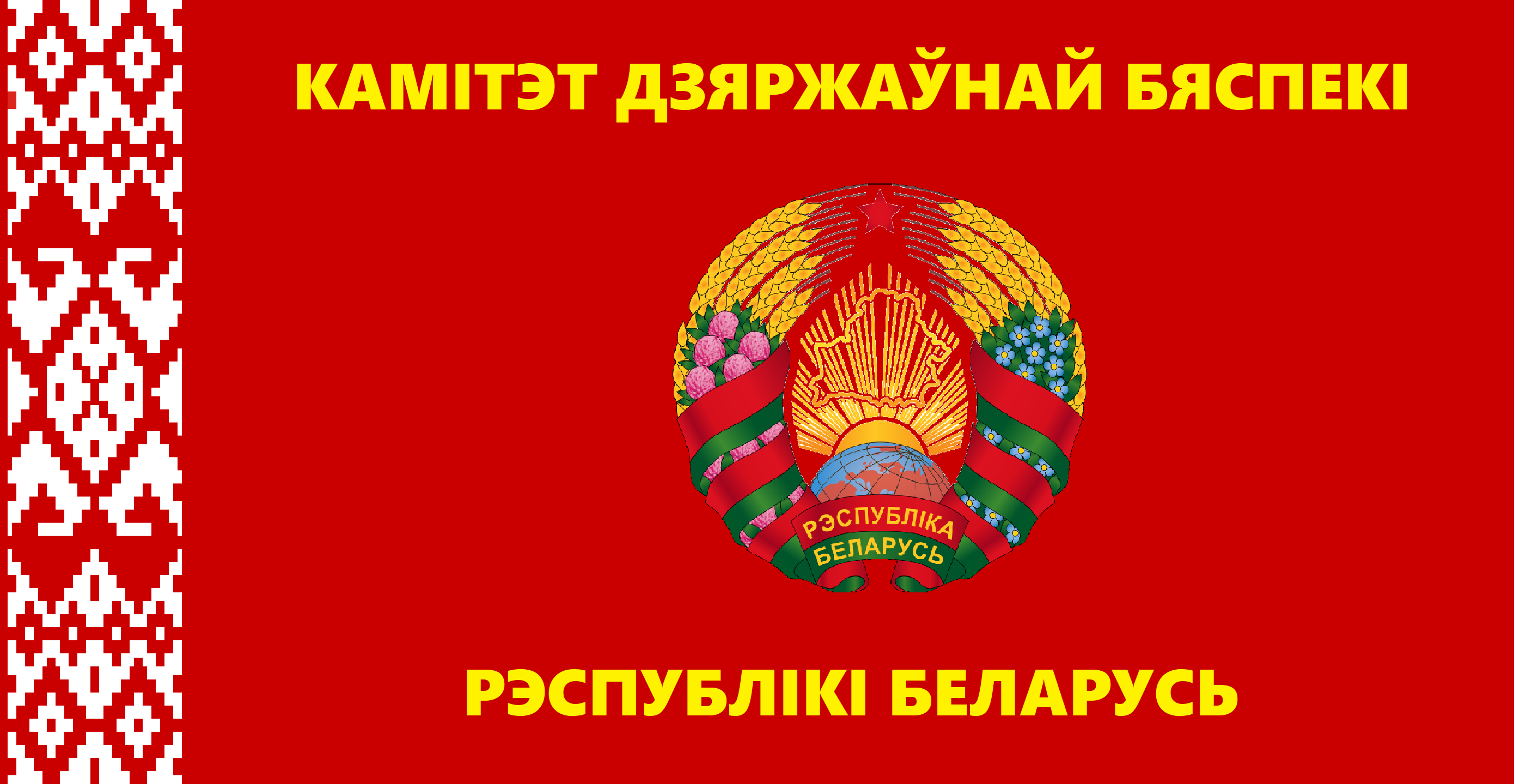
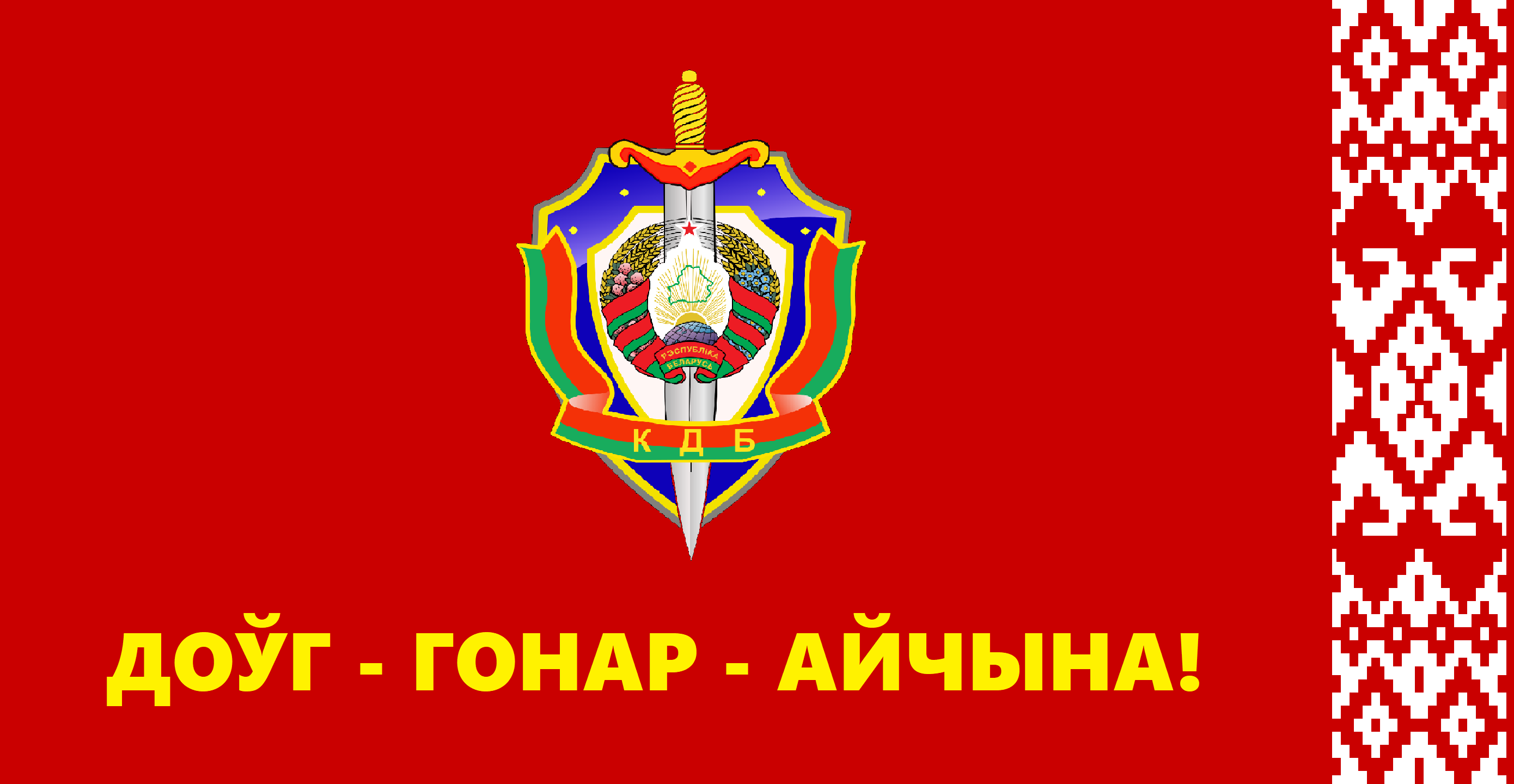
- Emblem and both sides of the flag of the KGB of Belarus

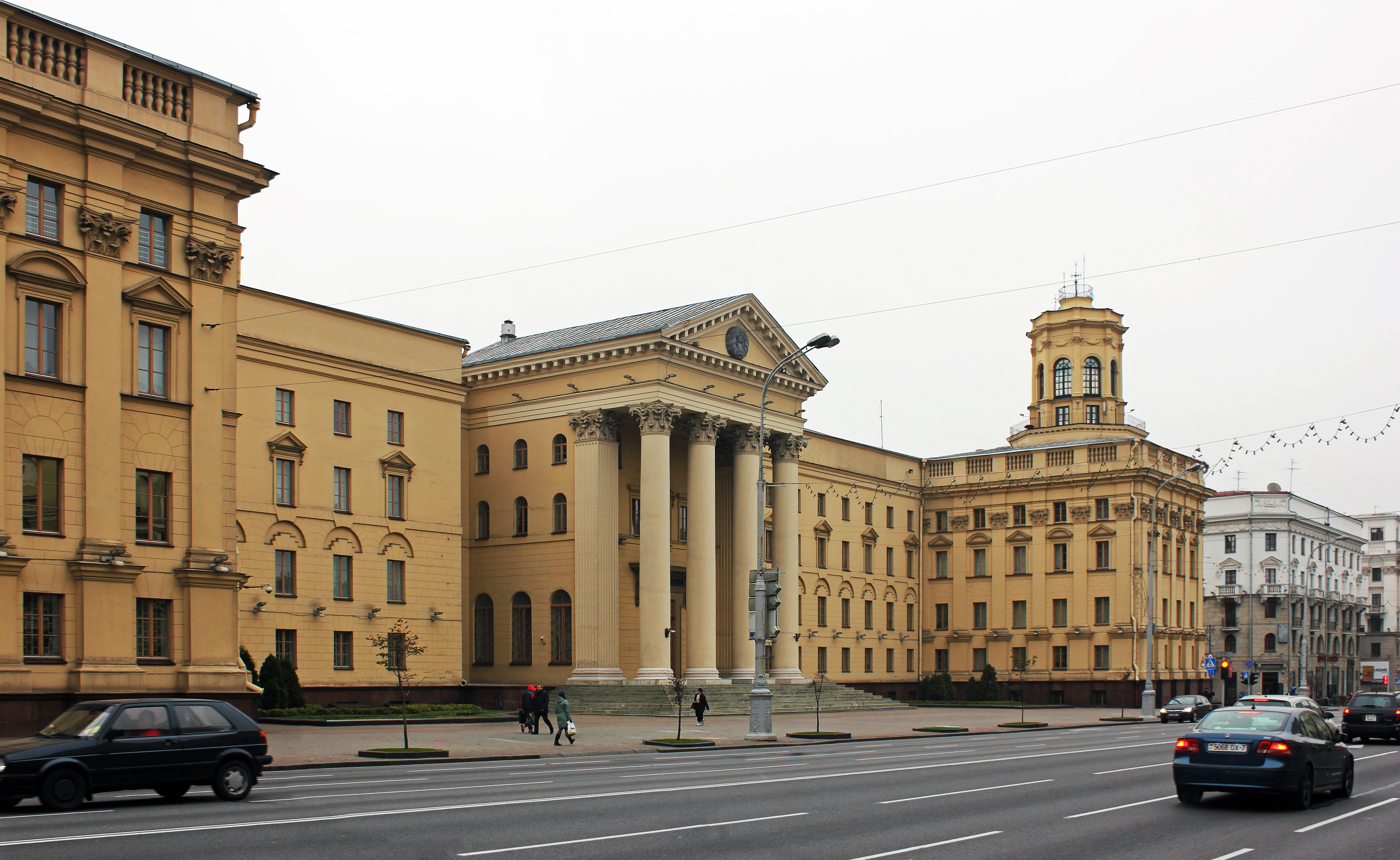
- KGB headquarters in Minsk

Special service overview
- Formed: 23 October 1991
- Preceding agencies: KGB of the USSR; KGB of the Belarusian SSR
- Jurisdiction: Belarus
- Headquarters: Independence Avenue 17, Minsk, Belarus; 53°53′56″N 27°33′16″E
- Employees: 10,000
- Annual budget: Br 241,000,000 (2022)
- Special service executive: Ivan Tertel, Chairman
- Website: kgb.by

The State Security Committee of the Republic of Belarus (KGB RB) (Note: Russian: Комитет государственной безопасности Республики Беларусь, КГБ РБ|Komitet gosudarstvennoy bezopasnosti Respubliki Belarus', KGB RB; Belarusian: Камітэт дзяржаўнай бяспекі Рэспублікі Беларусь, КДБ РБ, romanized: Kamitet dziaržaŭnaj biaspieki Respubliki Belarus', KDB RB) is the national intelligence agency, and secret police force of Belarus. Along with its counterparts in Transnistria and South Ossetia, it kept the unreformed name after declaring independence.

It is the successor to the KGB of the Byelorussian SSR, a branch of the Soviet KGB which operated in the Byelorussian republic. Felix Dzerzhinsky, who founded the first Soviet secret police, the Cheka, was born in present-day Belarus and remains an important figure in the state ideology of Belarus under president Alexander Lukashenko as well as a patron of the Belarusian KGB. It is governed by the law About State Security Bodies of the Republic of Belarus.

The KGB has command over the Alpha Group as the main counter-terrorist unit, and they can be tasked to help the Militsiya and other law enforcement organizations in anti-crime operations.

== History ==
On 1 March 1922, under the auspices Central Executive Committee of the BSSR, a State Political Directorate is formed. In July 1934, an NKVD republican affiliate was formed in the BSSR. 10 years later, during a reform of the Soviet Ministry of Internal Affairs, the Committee for State Security of the Byelorussian Soviet Socialist Republic (KGB of the BSSR) was formed, which would become an independent agency in 1978. On 25 August 1991, the Supreme Soviet of Belarus passed the Declaration of State Sovereignty of the Byelorussian Soviet Socialist Republic into constitutional law, effectively declaring independence from the USSR. In September 1991, the KGB of the BSSR was renamed to the KGB of the Republic of Belarus, becoming the new national security body of the state.

In October of that year, the Supreme Soviet mandated by law that the State Security Committee is subordinate to the Supreme Council of Belarus. In order to ensure the security of the new republic, the government provided regulations to the agency in January 1992.

Major General Vadim Zaitsev, who was in charge of Lukashenko's personal security, was appointed its leader in July 2008. His tenure lasted until November 2012 and he was replaced by Valery Vakulchik. The KGB is formally controlled by the President of Belarus, Alexander Lukashenko. Human rights organizations, the United States, and the European Union have accused the KGB of secret police activities and human rights abuses.

In September 2021, a member of the Alpha Group died while conducting a raid against a participant in the 2020–2021 Belarusian protests.

The KGB's database, containing 40,000 messages received from the public over nine years, was hacked and published online in 2024.

== Organization ==
The headquarters of the State Security Committee (Russian: Здание КГБ, Belarusian: Будынак КДБ) is located on Independence Avenue at the corner from Komsomolskaya Street. The building was built between 1945 and 1947 by architects Mikhail Parusnikov and Gennady Badanov. The building was erected in the style of Stalinist Architecture and Neoclassicism. The left wing stretches across Independence Avenue to adjoin the neighboring House of the Minsk Mutual Agricultural Insurance Association.

=== Structure ===
- Main Directorate of Counterintelligence Activities
- Main Directorate of Economic Security and Anti-Corruption
- Main Directorate for Provision of Operational Search Activities
- Government Communications Department
- Office of Military Counterintelligence (UVKR)

Each region has regional divisions:

- KGB Directorate for the Brest Region
- KGB Directorate for the Vitebsk Region
- KGB Directorate for the Grodno Region
- KGB Directorate for the Gomel Region
- KGB Directorate for the Mogilev Region
- KGB Directorate for Minsk and Minsk Region

=== Chairmen ===
| No. | Name | Rank | Term | | | Notes |
| No. | Name | Rank | Start | End | Duration | Notes |
|---|---|---|---|---|---|---|
| 1 | Eduard Shirkovsky | Colonel general | 30 October 1990 | 25 January 1994 | 3 years, 2 months and 26 days | |
| 2 | Gennady Lavitsky | Lieutenant general | 22 February 1994 | 23 July 1994 | 5 months and 1 day | Stepped down after Lukashenko's victory in 1994 elections |
| 3 | Vladimir Egorov (born 1939) | Colonel general | 28 July 194 | 20 December 1995 | 1 year, 4 months and 22 days | |
| 4 | Vladimir Matskevich (born 1947) | Lieutenant general | 20 December 1995 | 27 November 2000 | 4 years, 11 months and 7 days | Lost his job after sanctioning arrest of people allegedly responsible for disappearances in Belarus |
| 5 | Leonid Erin | Lieutenant general | 27 November 2000 | 18 November 2004 | 3 years, 11 months and 22 days | Having met with protesters against the 2004 referendum, he was removed from his duties the following day and fired a month later |
| 6 | Stepan Sukhorenko | Lieutenant general | 20 January 2005 | 17 July 2007 | 2 years, 5 months and 27 days | |
| 7 | Yuri Zhadobin | Lieutenant general | 17 July 2007 | 15 July 2008 | 11 months and 28 days | Formerly head of the Presidential Security Service |
| 8 | Vadim Zaitsev | Lieutenant general | 15 July 2008 | 9 November 2012 | 4 years, 3 months and 25 days | Was fired after a KGB lieutenant colonel committed suicide |
| 9 | Valery Vakulchik | Lieutenant general | 15 November 2012 | 3 September 2020 | 7 years, 9 months and 19 days | According to Lukashenko, he was fired due to Wagnergate |
| 10 | Ivan Tertel | Lieutenant general | 3 September 2020 | Incumbent | 6 years, 2 months and 9 days | |

== Role in political repressions ==
According to human rights organisations in the United States, and the European Union, the KGB and its senior leadership play a key role in human rights violations and political repressions in Belarus. The KGB has maintained both the name, the symbols and some of the repressive functions of its Soviet predecessor, the KGB of the Soviet Union.

== International sanctions ==
Several dozens former Chairmen and senior officers of the KGB of Belarus have been included in the sanctions lists of the European Union and the United States, especially following the brutal crackdown of peaceful protests that followed the allegedly falsified presidential elections of 2006 and 2010. Against most of them, the sanctions have been lifted in 2016 following an improvement of Belarus–European Union relations.

On 2 October 2020, the European Union added former chairman of the KGB Valery Vakulchik, as well as the Deputy Chairmen, to its sanctions list. On 6 November, Chairman Ivan Tertel was sanctioned by the EU as well. These people are also subject to the restrictive measures by the United Kingdom, Switzerland, and Canada.

The KGB Alpha Group was placed under US Treasury Department sanctions for their role in suppressing the 2020-21 protests.

On 21 June 2021, the U.S. Treasury has added the KGB of Belarus and its Chairman Ivan Tertel to its Specially Designated Nationals and Blocked Persons List with the following motivation:

The State Security Committee of the Republic of Belarus (Belarusian KGB) has continually pressured and targeted the opposition in the aftermath of the fraudulent 2020 election. The Belarusian KGB has detained, intimidated, and otherwise pressured the opposition, to include Pratasevich. In November 2020, the Belarusian KGB added Pratasevich and another opposition journalist to its list of terrorists.

In 2022, the KGB and Tertel were included in the sanctions lists of the European Union, the United States, Switzerland and Japan, while Ukraine blacklisted only Tertel.

In January 2025, Canada joined the sanctions against the KGB.

=== KGB officers sanctioned by the EU or the US ===
==== Chairmen and Deputy Chairmen ====
- Stepan Sukhorenko, Chairman of the KGB in 2005–2007, including during the 2006 Belarusian presidential election. On EU sanctions list in 2006–2016; remains under sanctions by the United States.
- Vadim Zaitsev, Chairman of the KGB. According to the decision of the European Union, he is “responsible for transforming the KGB into the main organ of repression of civil society and of the democratic opposition” and for state propaganda accusing the protesters of bringing weapons to their rally.” According to the EU, Zaitsev “personally threatened the lives and health of the wife and child of former presidential candidate, Andrei Sannikov. He is the main initiator of orders for unlawful harassment of democratic opposition, the torture of political opponents and the mistreatment of prisoners.”
- Vasily Dementei, First Deputy Chairman of the KGB; included in the EU sanctions list after crackdown of protests that followed the controversial presidential election of 2006.
- Igor Bakhmatov, former Deputy Chairman of the KGB in charge of the staff and the organisation of their tasks, responsible for the repressive work of the KGB against civil society and democratic opposition.
- Vasili Dementey, former First deputy Chairman of the KGB (2005–2007); responsible for repressions against civil society and the democratic opposition, in particular after the presidential election of 2006 and in 2007.
- Viktor Vegera, First Deputy Chairman of the KGB.
- Leonid Dedkov, Deputy Chairman of the KGB.
- Nikolai Smolenski, former Deputy Chairman of the KGB.
- Nikolai Svorob, former Deputy Chairman of the KGB.
- Petr Tretiak, former Deputy Chairman of the KGB and Member of the Commission of the Security Council on radio frequencies.
- Ivan Tertel, Deputy Chairman of the KGB, in charge of economic crime and the fight against corruption.

==== Torture ====
- Colonel Aleksandr Orlov, head of the KGB detention centre in Minsk: according to the EU, he was personally responsible for "cruel, inhuman and degrading treatment or punishment of detainees" in the weeks and months after the crackdown on the protests in Minsk on 19 December 2010, on the eve of the 2010 presidential election. He has been on EU sanctions list between 2011 and 2016.
- Colonel Oleg Chernyshev; he allegedly personally participated in tortures of opposition activists in the KGB detention centre in Minsk after the crackdown on the post-election protest demonstration in Minsk on 19 December 2010.
- Lieutenant Colonel Dmitri Sukhov, operative of the military counter-intelligence of the KGB; accused of falsifying evidence and using threats in order to extort confessions from detained opposition activists in the KGB detention centre in Minsk after the crackdown on the post-election protest demonstration in Minsk on 19 December 2010.
- Lieutenant Colonel Pavel Traulko, former operative of the military counter-intelligence of the KGB, then head of the press service of the newly formed Investigative Committee of Belarus. He is accused of falsifying evidence and using threats in order to extort confessions from opposition activists in the KGB detention centre in Minsk after 19 December 2010. According to the EU, he was directly responsible for the use of “cruel, inhuman and degrading treatment or punishment and for denying the right to a fair trial”.

==== Sector (Board) commanders ====
- Viktor Yaruta, Head of the KGB Board on State Communications
- Valeri Maslakov, Head of the KGB Board of Intelligence
- Sergei Shugaev, Head of the KGB Counter-Intelligence Division and former Deputy Head of the KGB Counter-Intelligence Board
- Ivan Sanko, Major, senior investigator of the KGB
- Aleksandr Tolstashov, Head of the KGB Board on Protection of the Constitutional Order and Fight Against Terrorism
- Igor Voropaev, former Head of the KGB Board on State Communications
- Sergei Volkov, former Head of the KGB Board of Intelligence
- Alexey Zakharov, former Head of Military Counter-intelligence Board of the KGB

==== Regional commanders ====
In 2011, commanders of the KGB in the regions of Belarus were accused by the EU of being responsible for political repressions in their regions:

- Igor Busko, Head of the KGB of the Brest Region
- Gennadi Gerasimenko, former Head of the KGB of the Vitebsk Region
- Vladimir Kalach, Head of the KGB of the Minsk Region and the city of Minsk, former Deputy Head of the KGB for Minsk
- Ivan Korzh, Head of the KGB of the Hrodna Region
- Igor Kuznetsov, former Head of the KGB in the Minsk Region and in Minsk city
- Ivan Leskovski, Head of the KGB for Homel and former Deputy Head of the KGB for Homel
- Igor Sergeenko, Head of the KGB of the City District of Mahiliou

== International activity ==
A cooperation deal between the State Security Service of Georgia and the KGB was signed in 2016 and came into force in 2021. At the time it came into force, their relationship was criticized over the KGB's role in suppressing the 2020–2021 Belarusian protests.

In January 2021, EUobserver published an audio file, allegedly being a secret recording of a meeting that took place in 2012 between then KGB head Vadim Zaitsev and several KGB officers, discussing plans to assassinate several exiled enemies of the Lukashenka regime: whistleblower Aleh Alkayeu, colonel Uladzimir Baradach and anti-corruption chief Viachaslau Dudkin, as well as journalist Pavel Sheremet. Sheremet was eventually murdered in a manner as discussed by the persons on the tape four years after the alleged recording date, in 2016.

On 1 December 2021, US-based Meta announced that 41 fake accounts on Facebook and 4 on Instagram belonging to the Belarusian KGB were removed. The accounts criticised the actions of Poland during Belarus–European Union border crisis in English, Polish and Kurdish, while pretending to be journalists and activists.

On 10 April 2022, Meta reported that Internet accounts linked to KGB on the first day of the Russian invasion of Ukraine tried to spread fake news about the surrender of the Ukrainian army and the flight of Ukrainian authorities.

== See also ==
- Human rights in Belarus
- List of people and organizations sanctioned in relation to human rights violations in Belarus
- Cyber Partisans
