= Denis Duk =

Belarusian academic (born 1977)

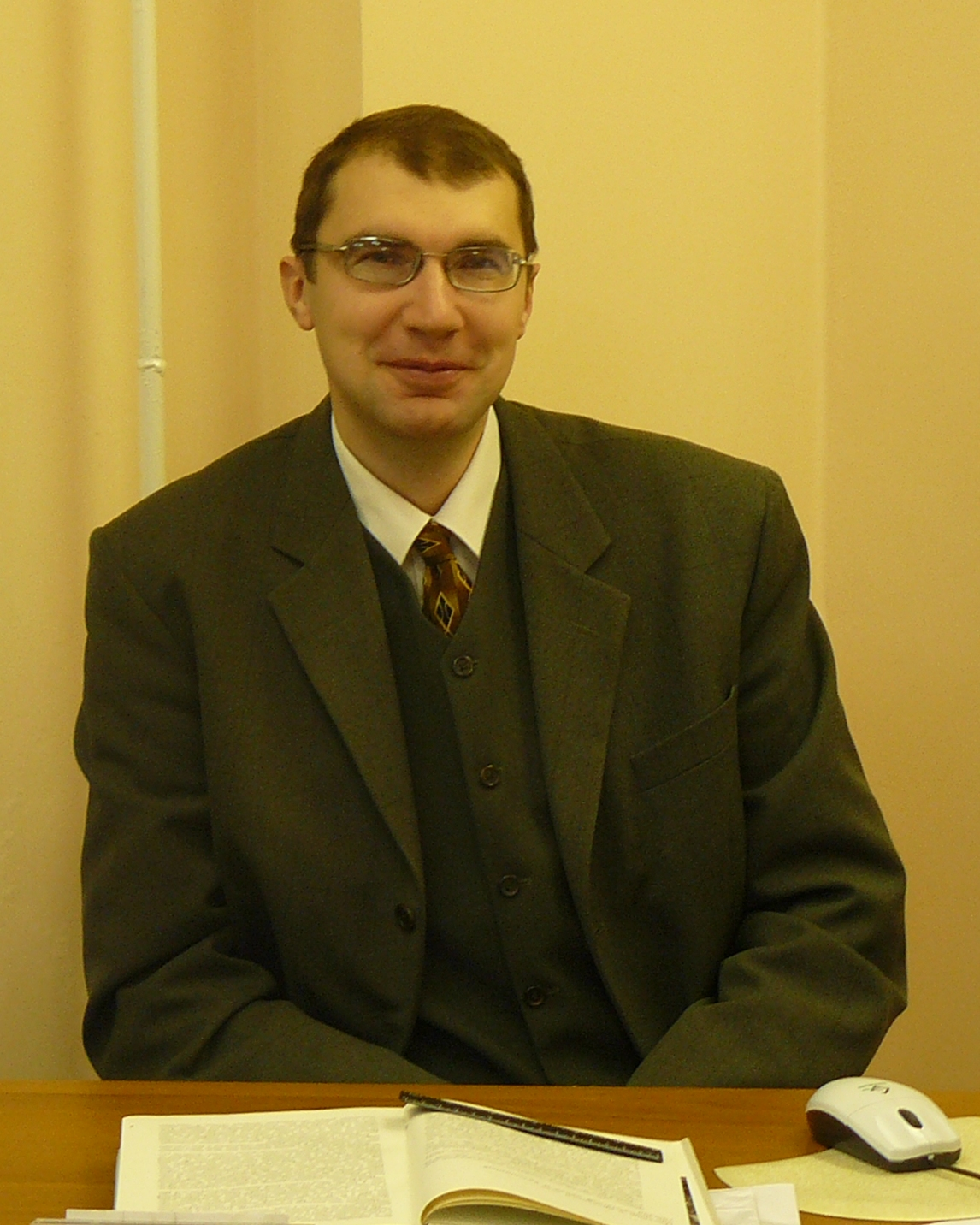
- Duk in 2011

Rector of Mogilev State A. Kuleshov University
- Incumbent
- Assumed office 28 September 2017
- President: Alexander Lukashenko
- Preceded by: Konstantin Bondarenko

Personal details
- Born: 29 May 1977 (age 48)

Denis Vladimirovich Duk (Russian: Денис Владимирович Дук; born 29 May 1977) is a Belarusian historian, archaeologist and academic serving as rector of Mogilev State A. Kuleshov University since 2017. He has been a member of the Central Election Commission since 2021.
