= Nikolai Lukashenko =

Son of Alexander Lukashenko (born 2004)

- Николай Лукашенко; Мікалай Лукашэнка
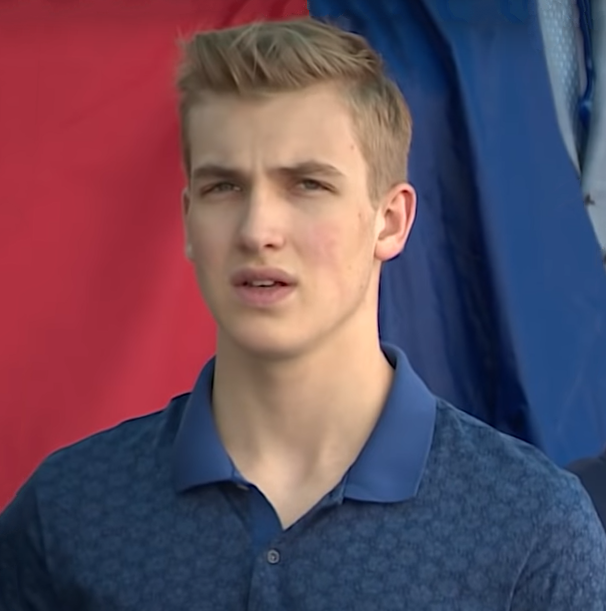
- Lukashenko in 2019
- Born: 31 August 2004 (age 22); Minsk, Belarus
- Other name: Kolya
- Education: Belarusian State University; Peking University
- Father: Alexander Lukashenko
- Relatives: Viktor (half-brother); Dmitry (half-brother); Galina (step-mother)

Nikolai Aleksandrovich Lukashenko (Note: Russian: Николай Александрович Лукашенко) (also transliterated as Mikalay Alyaksandravich Lukashenka; (Note: Belarusian: Мікалай Аляксандравіч Лукашэнка) born 31 August 2004) is the third son of president of Belarus Alexander Lukashenko.

== Early life, family and education ==
Alexander Lukashenko remains formally married to his wife Galina Lukashenko, but the couple have not lived together or been seen together since 1990s. There has been no official commentary regarding the identity of Nikolai's mother. However, according to a widespread version, his mother is Irina Abelskaya, a former personal physician of Alexander Lukashenko, whose mother worked as Belarusian Minister of Healthcare. In a 2016 interview, Irina seemed to implicitly refer to Nikolai when she was asked whether or not she would like her "youngest son" to become a doctor, as she comes from a family of doctors, her reply was that she would like him to "get a good education, choose an interesting profession, love his job, enjoy it and bring benefit and joy to others."

Nikolai has two half-brothers on his father Alexander's side, Viktor and Dmitry, and one presumed half-brother on his mother's side, Dmitry Evgen'evich Abelskiy.

=== Education ===
In 2011, Lukashenko entered Ostroshitsko-Gorodok Secondary School. In 2020, he entered Belarusian State University Lyceum. Later in August 2020, Lukashenko was reported to have dropped out of the Lyceum. According to the Belarusian Investigative Center, he graduated from a private gymnasium in the Drazdy district of Minsk, which was operated by the company founded by Irina Abelskaya. In 2022, he enrolled in a biotechnology program at Belarusian State University, a collaboration with Peking University. Alexander Lukashenko stated the program was established so his son could obtain diplomas from both institutions.

== Public life ==
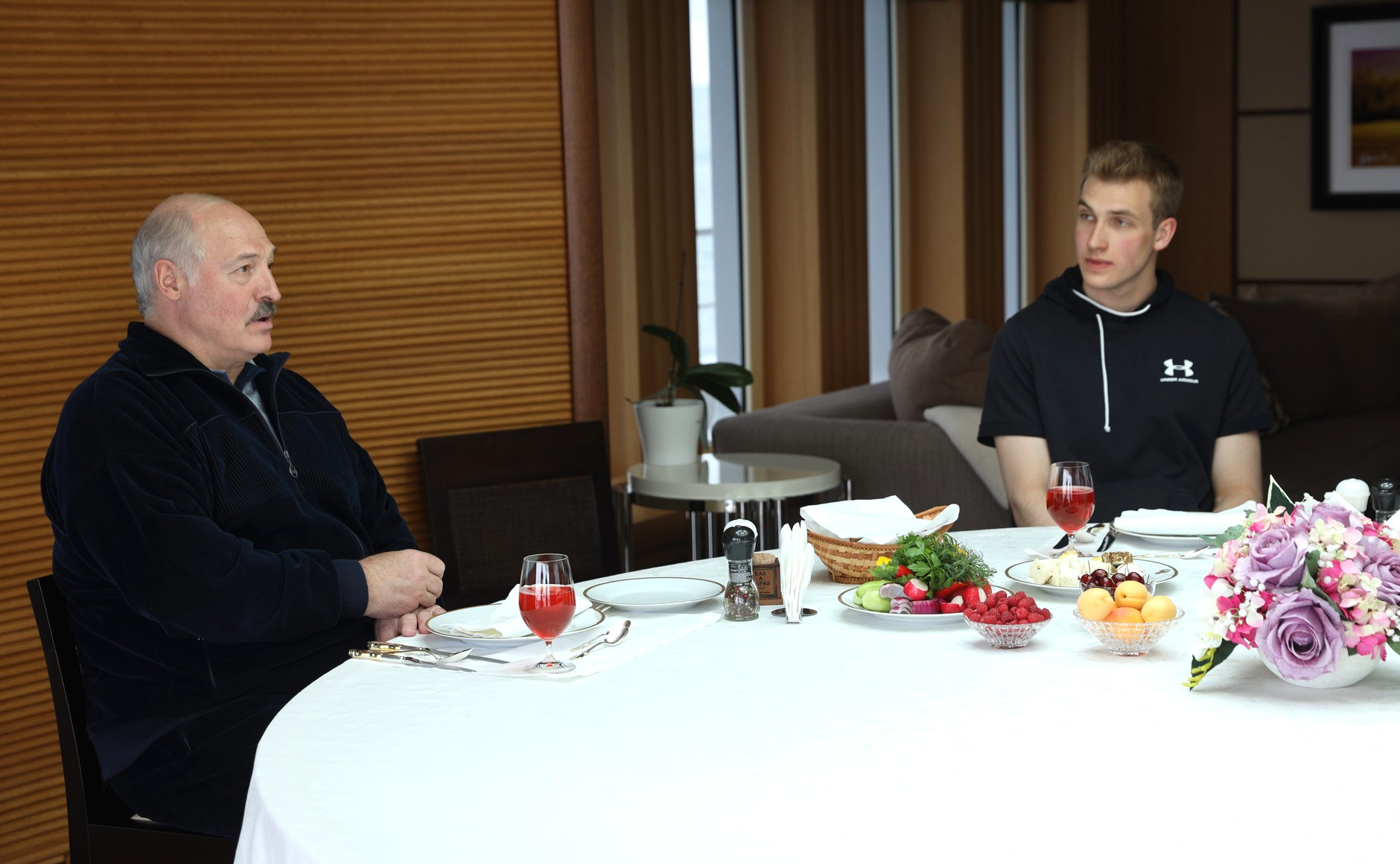
Lukashenko and his father during a dinner with Vladimir Putin, 2021

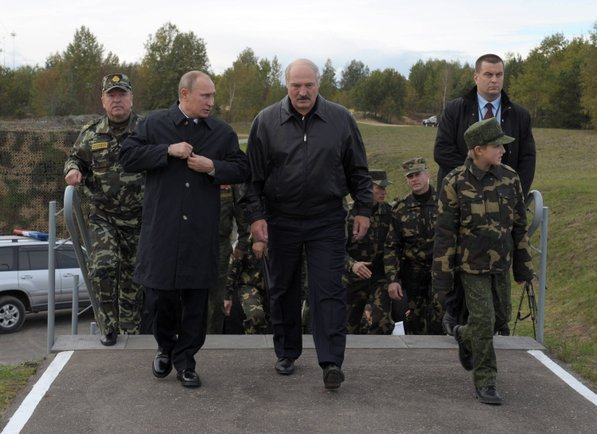
Nikolai in camouflage clothing (right) with Vladimir Putin and his father Alexander Lukashenko at the Gozhsky training ground during the final stage of the "Zapad 2013" Russian-Belarusian strategic military exercises in 2013

Lukashenko appeared in public for the first time in 2008. He has attracted significant media attention as his father, President Alexander Lukashenko, has frequently taken him to official ceremonies and state visits, including meetings with Venezuelan president Hugo Chávez, presidents of Russia Dmitry Medvedev and Vladimir Putin, Pope Benedict XVI, as well as US president Barack Obama.

According to his father, this was at Lukashenko's insistence. However, it has been speculated that he was positioned as a potential successor to Alexander's presidency. Lukashenko attracted further media attention in 2013, when Alexander stated that his son would become a President of Belarus, causing numerous speculations in the press. Later in August 2025, Alexander dismissed speculations of grooming Nikolai to succeed him as president in 2030, which at an age of 25 to 26 would have likely led to Nikolai to become the youngest current world leader.

In 2015, ten-year-old Lukashenko took part in a session of the United Nations General Assembly. In June 2020, he and his father attended the Moscow Victory Day Parade on Red Square. In August 2020, amid protests in Belarus, Lukashenko appeared alongside his father in camouflage-style body armour carrying a rifle.

In August 2024, Lukashenko was added to the sanctions list of Canada.

== Personal life ==
Lukashenko speaks Russian and English, and is also learning Chinese and Spanish. He has been taking piano lessons since he was nine years old.
