= Minsk Innovation University =

University in Minsk, Belarus

Coordinates: 53.8699°N 27.6602°E

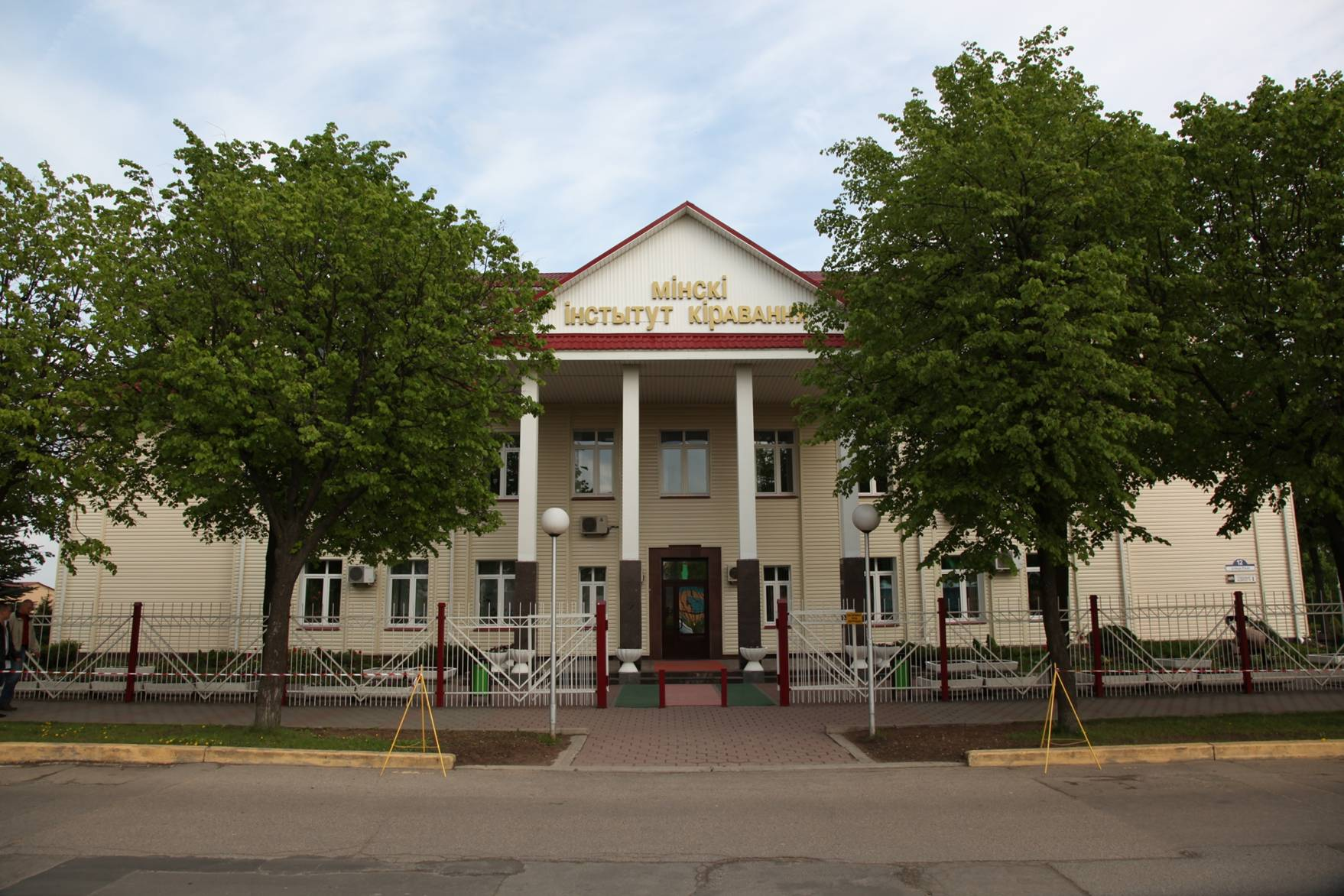
- Type: private educational institution
- Active: 1991–2023
- Rector: Nikolay Susha
- Administrative staff: 500
- Students: 12600
- Location: Minsk, Belarus
- Website: http://www.miu.by/
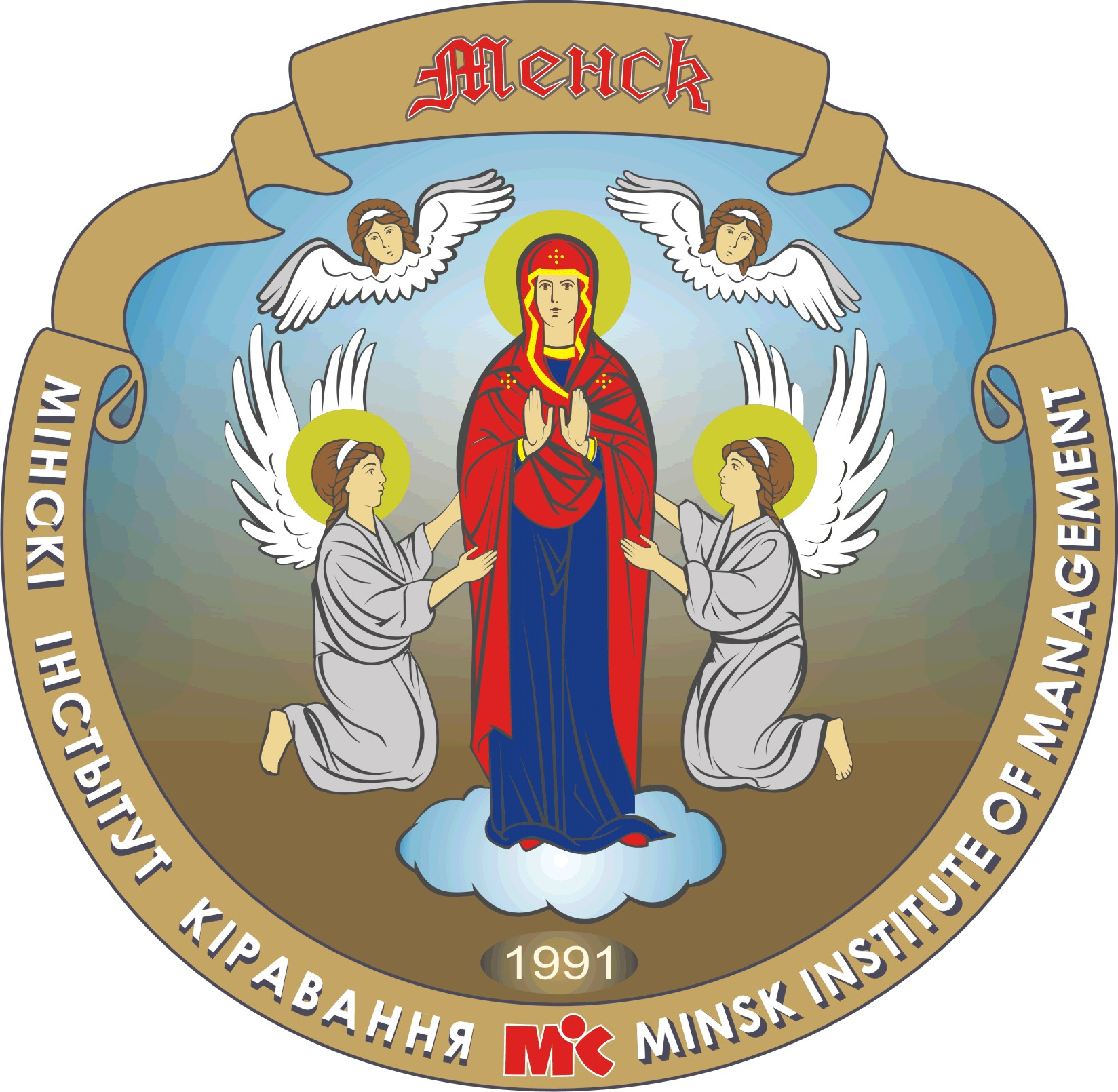

Minsk Innovation University (Belarusian: Мінскі інавацыйны ўніверсітэт, romanized: Minski inavacyjny ŭniviersitet) was established in 1991, originally as Minsk Institute of Management, changing to Minsk Innovation University by 2023. The founder of the institution is Nikolay Susha, a permanent rector of the university. The university is situated in Minsk, Belarus. The university taught students in economics, law, psychology, foreign languages, and information technology. In 2023, the liquidation of the university began by decision of the owner.

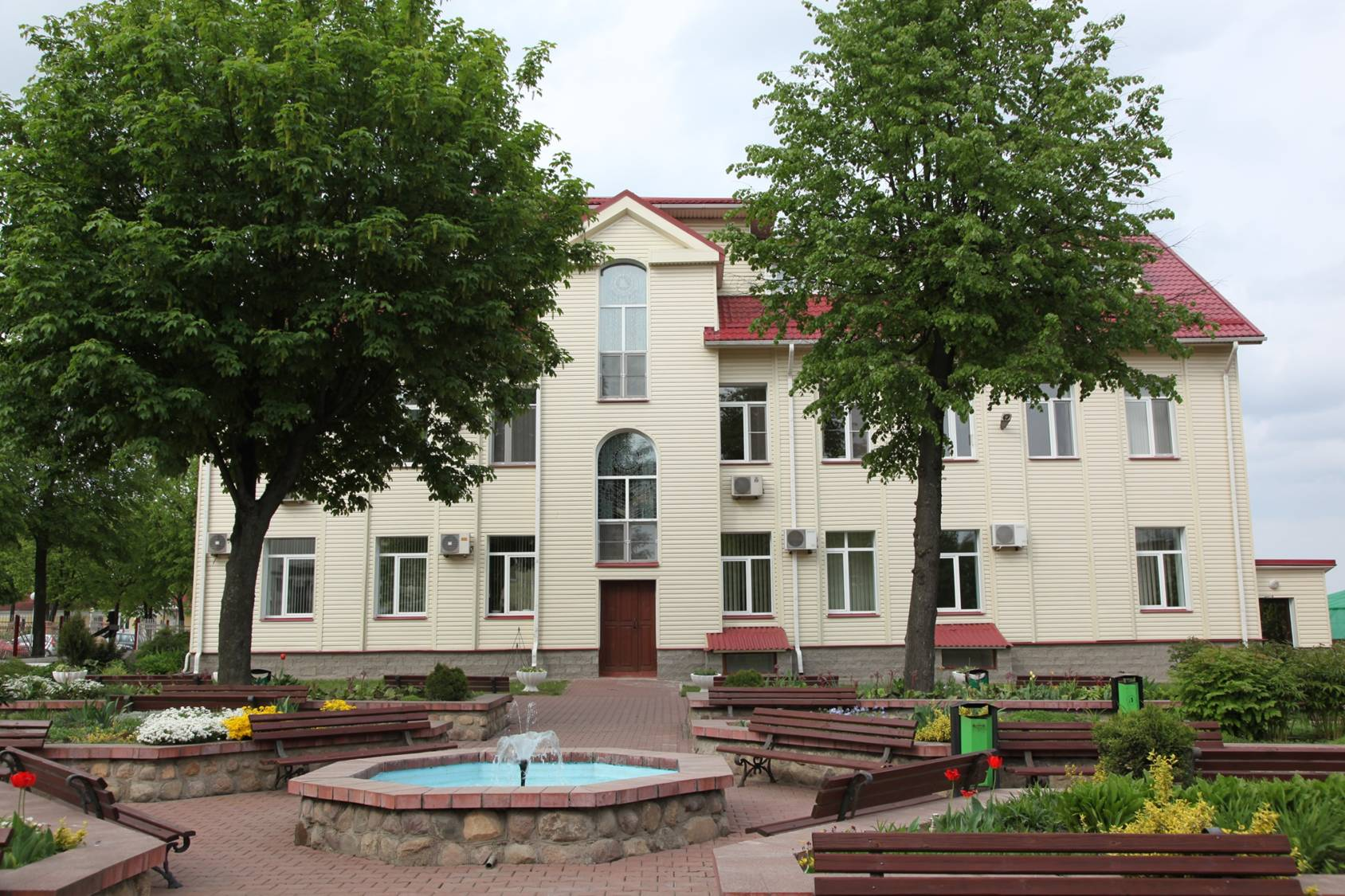
Main building

The university has four faculties and offers a number of programs for students, master's degree students, PhD, and grand PhD students. All training in the university is conducted on a fee basis.

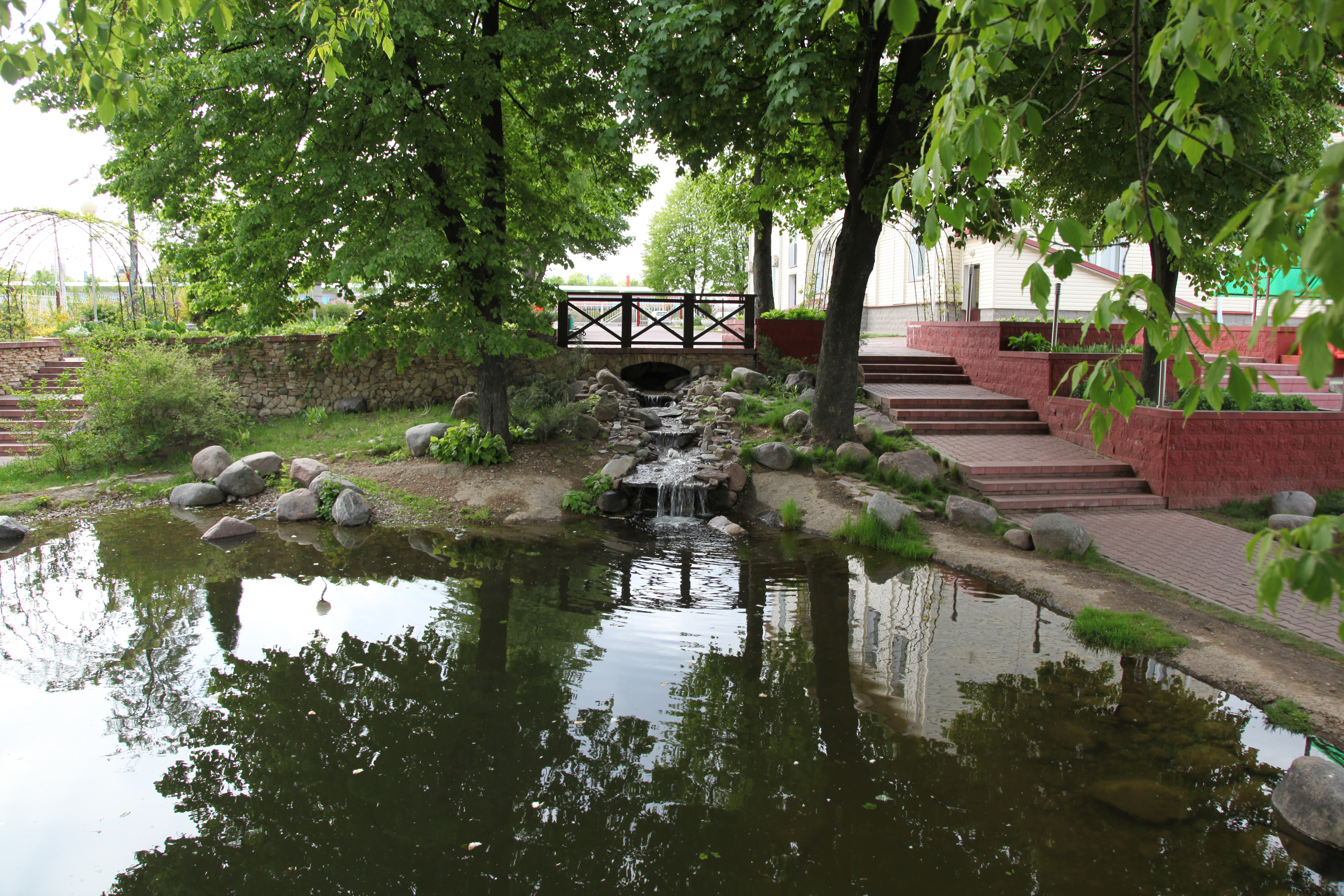
Romantic garden

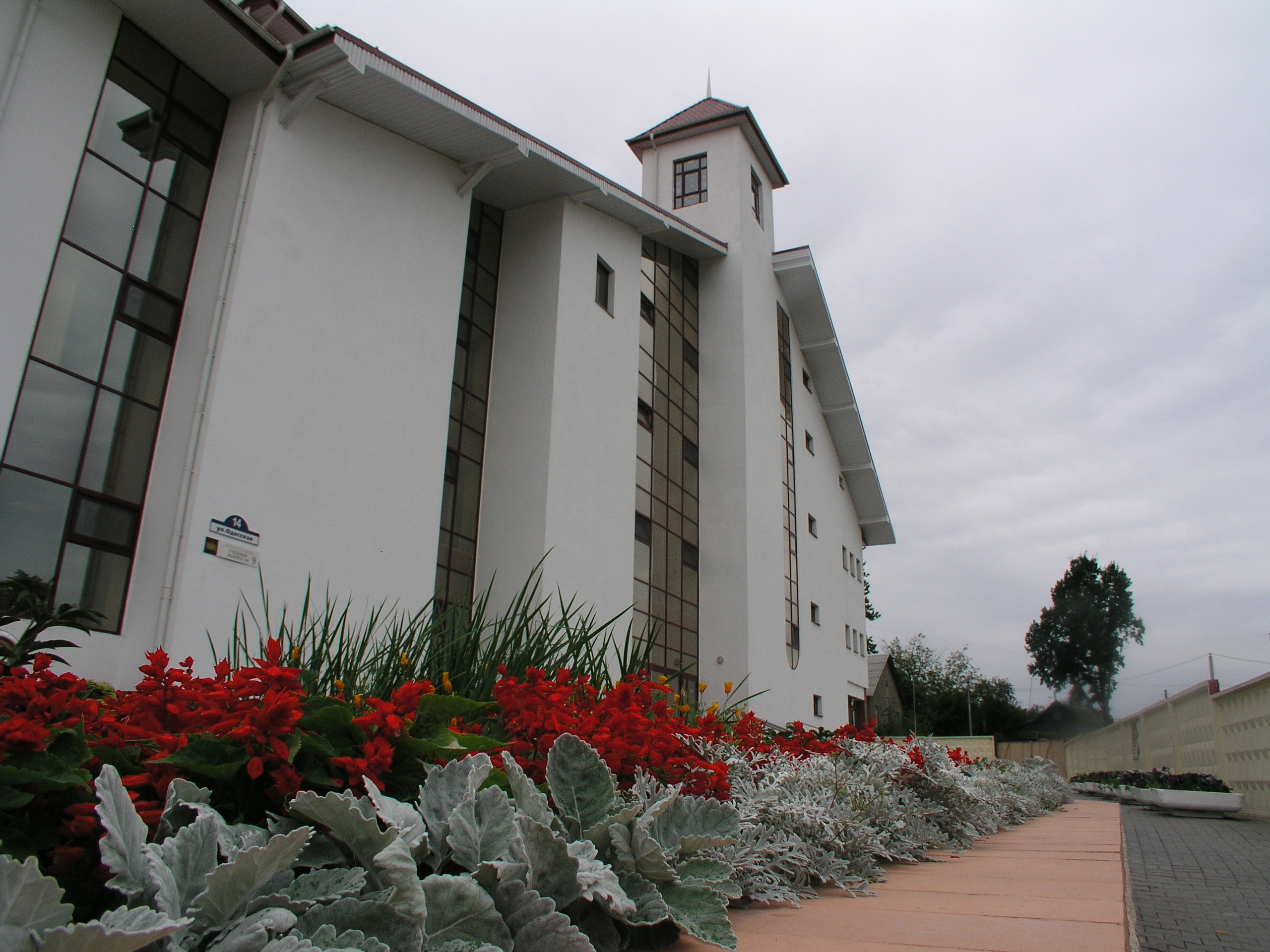
Building 9

== Creation, name change, and closure ==
Minsk Innovation University was created in 1991 by economist Nikolay Vasilyevich Susha, with the name (in English) Minsk Institute of Management.

The institution continued as Minsk Institute of Management for many years, including 2013. By 2023, the institution's name had changed to Minsk Innovation University (Минский инновационный университет).

== Faculty of Engineering and Information ==
Programs:

- Information systems and technologies (majors):
1. Information systems and technologies (in economics); qualification of an engineer-programmer-economist
2. Information systems and technologies (in management); qualification of an engineer-programmer
- Informatics (web-design and computer-based graphics); qualification of a programmer
- Applied Computer science (web-programming and computer-aided design); qualification of expert on computer graphics design and web application development
- Management; qualification of a manager-economist
- Marketing; qualification of a marketer-economist

=== Master's degree courses ===
Programs:

- Management in social and economic systems
- System analysis, management and information processing (majors)

== Faculty of Communication and Law ==
Programs:

- Jurisprudence; qualification of a lawyer
- Economic law; qualification of a lawyer with the knowledge of economics
- Psychology; qualification of a psychologist and a teacher of psychology
- Modern foreign languages (translation); qualification of a linguist, a translator (English and German languages); only full-time education is possible for this major
- Design (majors):
1. Design (object-spatial environment), qualification of a designer
2. Design (virtual environment), qualification of a designer

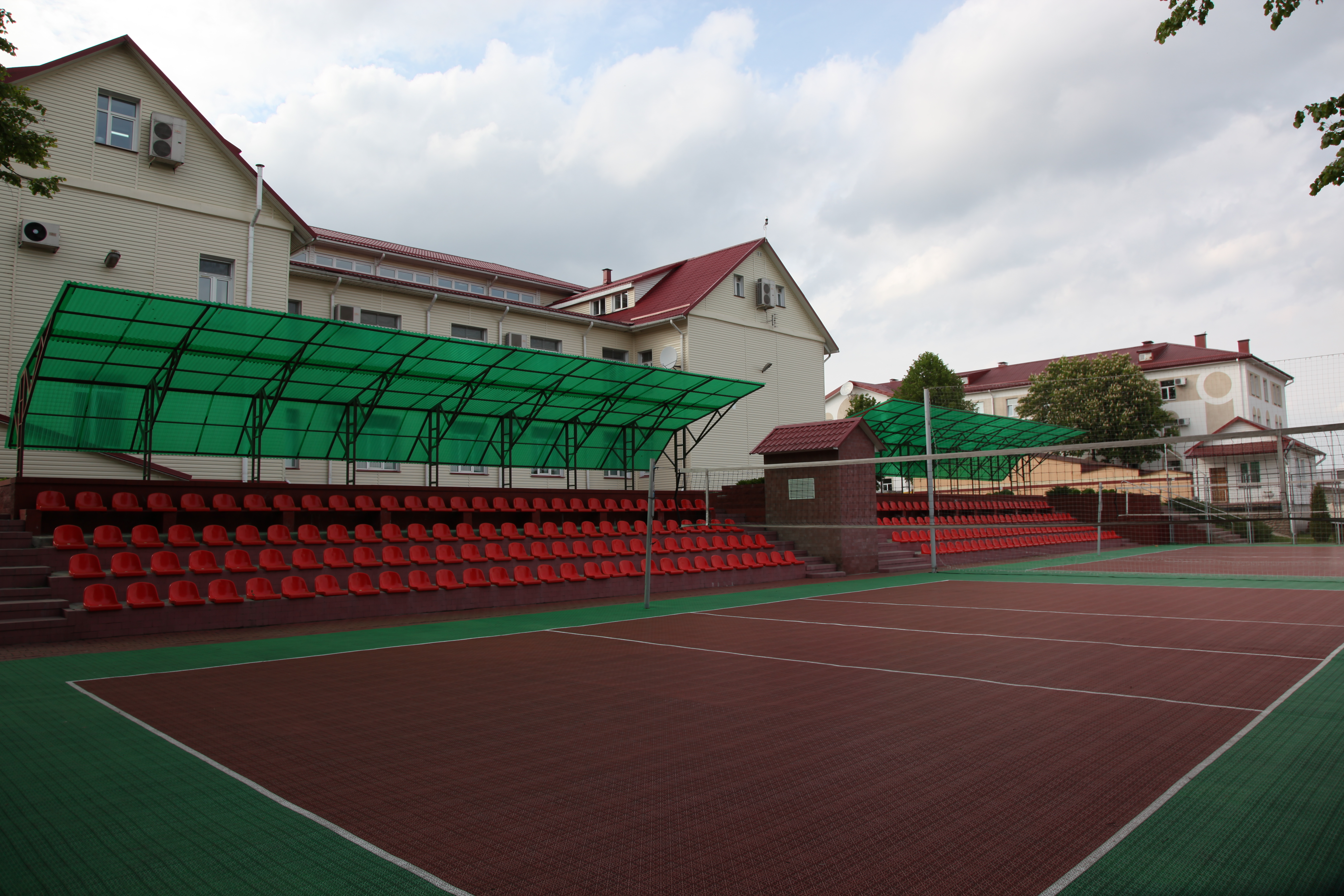
Sports facilities

=== Master’s degree courses ===
Programs:

- Germanic languages
- Psychology
- Jurisprudence

== Faculty of Economics ==
Programs:

- World economics; qualification of an economist
- Economics and production management; qualification of an economist-manager
- Business accounting, analysis and auditing; qualification of an economist
- Finances and crediting; qualification of an economist

=== Master’s degree courses ===
Programs:

- World economics
- Finances, money circulation and credit
- Economics and national economy management
- Business accounting, statistics

== Faculty of Advanced Training and Retraining «Higher School of Management» ==
Programs:

- Graphic Design
- Psychology
- Economics and Industrial Enterprises Management
- Finances
- Banking
- Accounting and control in industry
- Innovation Management
- Marketing
- Information Systems Software.

== PhD courses ==
Programs:

- Economics and national economy management
- Civil law, business law, family law and international private law

== Grand PhD course ==
Programs:

- Economics and national economy management

== Library ==
Library of Minsk Institute of Management was founded on the 28 December 1994.

In 2011 e-library was created. You can find materials of conferences, seminars and e-versions of journals, published in the institute e-library

== Scientific journals ==
Since 2005, Minsk Institute of Management is the founder and publisher of the periodical scientific, practical and industrial journals:

- «Innovative Educational technologies» (issued four times per year)
- «Economics and Management» (issued four times per year)
- «Current Issues of Science in the 21st century» (issued once a year)

== Rankings and Reputation ==
- Minsk Institute of Management at present state holds 5th position in the list of top Colleges and Universities in Belarus by University Web Ranking uniRank

Minsk Institute of Management also takes part in:

- Ranking Web of Universities
- Ranking Web of Business Schools
- Ranking Web of Repositories

== See also ==
- List of universities in Belarus
- The Ministry of Education of the Republic of Belarus: Privately owned institutions
