= Alpha Group (Belarus) =

- Альфа
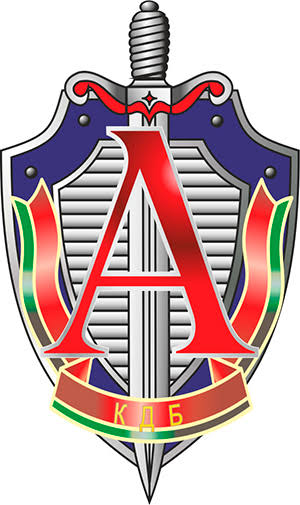
- Unit emblem
- Active: 3 March 1990 – present
- Country: Soviet Union (1990–1991); Belarus (1991–present)
- Branch: Spetsnaz of the KGB (1990–1991); State Security Committee of the Republic of Belarus (КДБ/КГБ) (1991–present)
- Type: Spetsnaz
- Role: Counter-terrorism; Hostage rescue Special operations
- Size: Classified
- Part of: State Security Committee of the Republic of Belarus
- Garrison/HQ: Minsk
- Nickname: Alpha Group or Group A
- Anniversaries: 2020 (30th Anniversary)

Commanders
- Current commander: Colonel Sergei Zubkov
- Notable commanders: Colonel Oleg Chernyshev (Note: His name in Belarusian is Aleh Anatolievich Charnyshou.)

Insignia
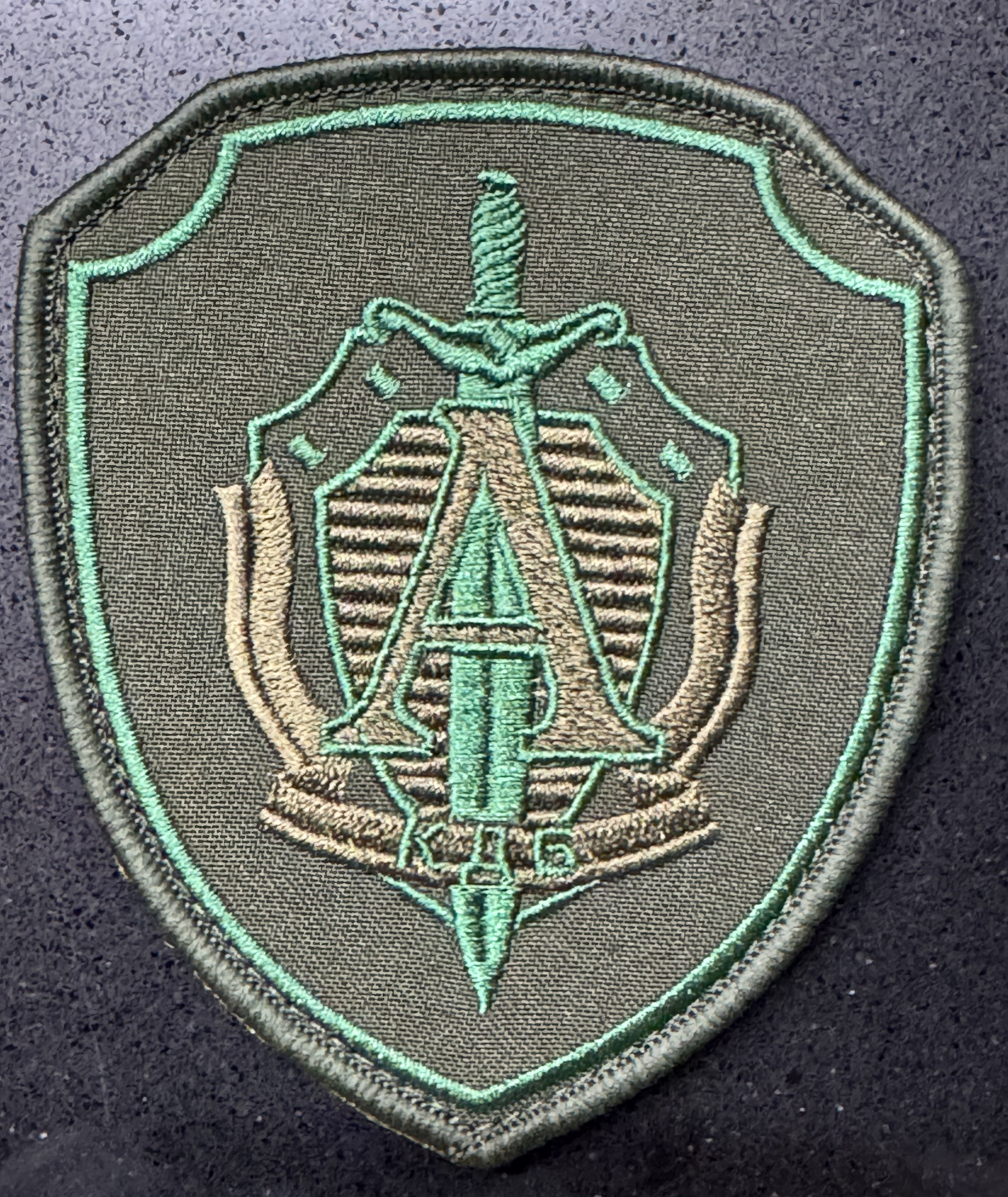
- Patch

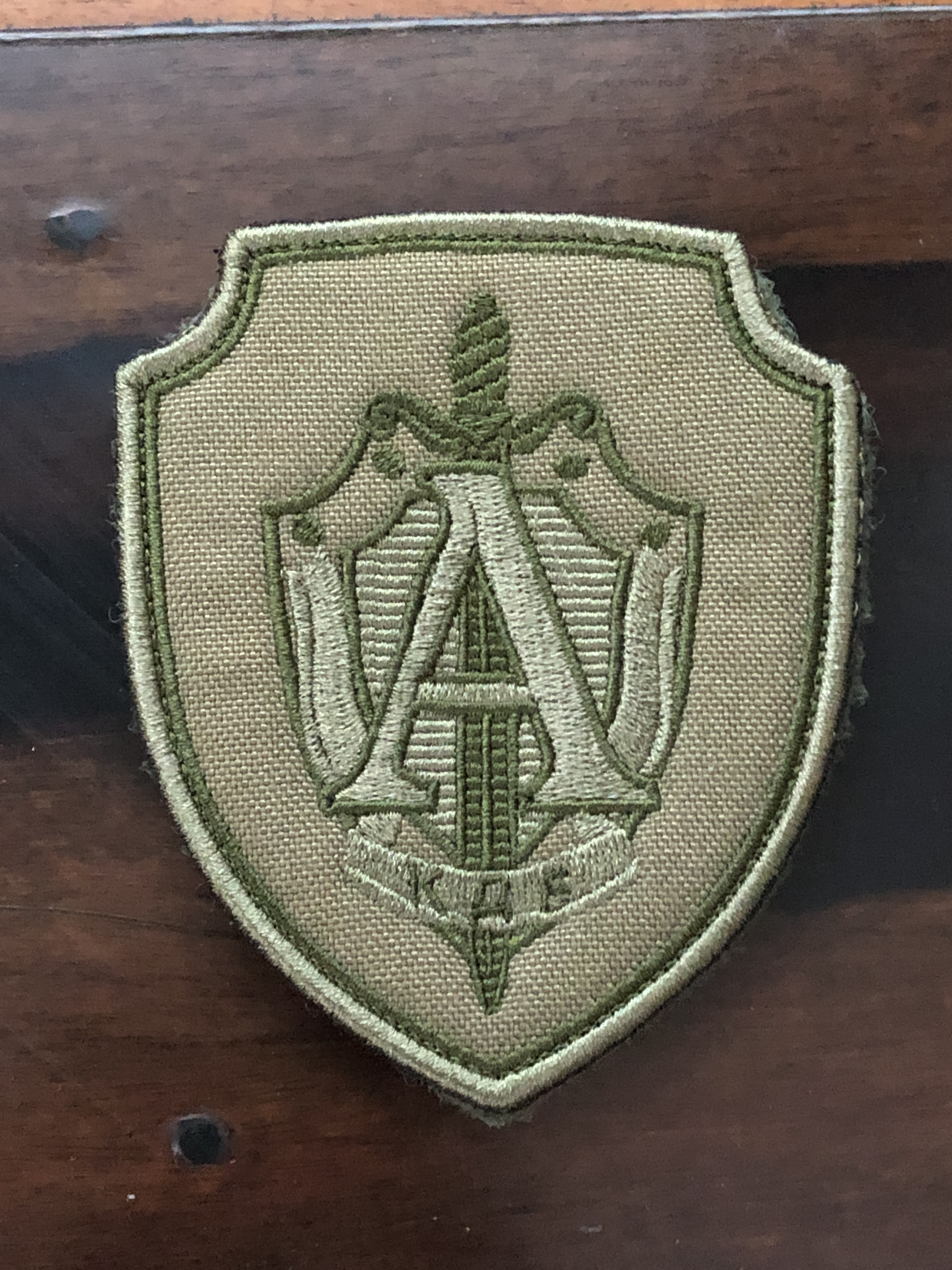
- Patch

The Belarusian Alpha Group (Belarusian: КДБ Альфа-група, Russian: КГБ «Альфа») is a special unit of the State Security Committee of the Republic of Belarus, tasked to handle counter-terrorism operations throughout Belarus when regular Belarusian law enforcement units are underequipped to handle the task. It also assists law enforcement units in anti-crime operations.

It traces its origin to the Soviet-era Alpha Group, created on July 28, 1974. As of 2014, Colonel Sergei Zubkov is designated the commander of the unit.

== History ==
The Soviet KGB has designed the creation of Alpha Group on July 28, 1974, when Yuri Andropov was head of the KGB after the 1972 Munich massacre. It's suggested that the order was done to respond West Germany's creation of Grenzschutzgruppe 9.

The unit was created on March 3, 1990, stationed at the Byelorussian Soviet Socialist Republic and tasked to tackle anti-terrorist assignments throughout the BSSR and the Baltic States under orders from Vladimir Kryuchkov as the 11th Group of the KGB. The unit was initially staffed by 45 operators.

=== Post-USSR breakup ===
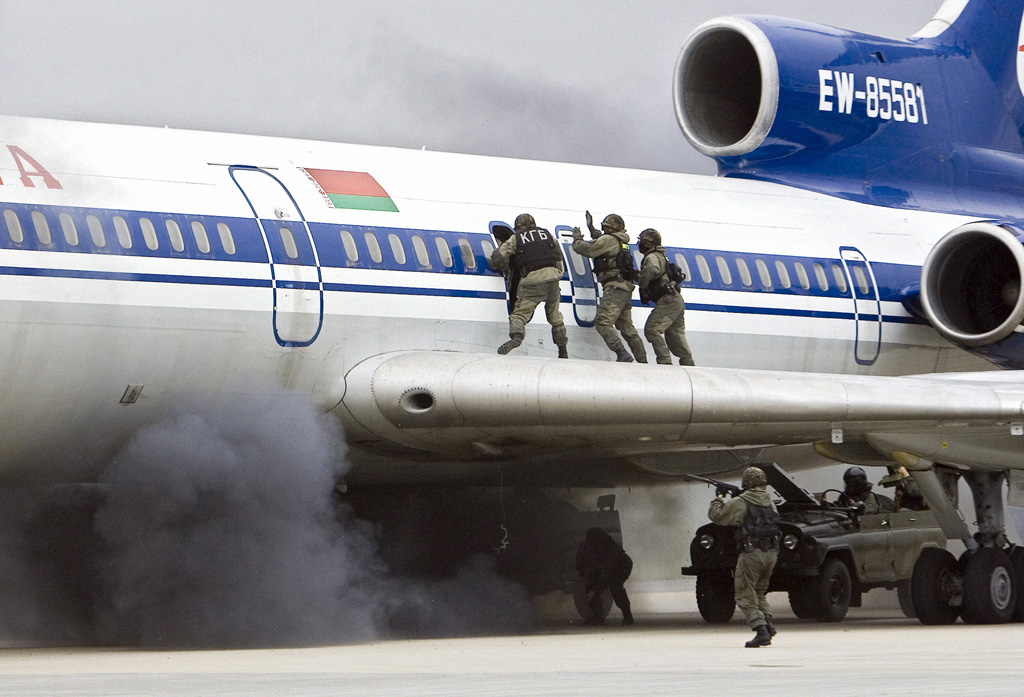
Belarusian AG operators conduct a breaching exercise in 2008.

In 1992, the unit officially received its official name and was placed under the command of the SSCRB.

In 1994, AG was involved in a hostage rescue operation when an armed criminal took a student named Milana Martinkevich hostage. She was rescued and the criminal was detained.

On August 1, 1996, the AG was involved in arresting five men, including an active Belarusian soldier, for attempting to smuggle nuclear material in Borisov for $50,000.

In June 2006, the KGB has reaffirmed Alpha Group's mandate to combat terrorism. AG operators were involved in anti-terrorist exercises throughout the year alongside Belarusian military and law enforcement forces.

In the 2010s, Colonel Oleg Chernyshev was placed under various financial and travel-based sanctions for the KGB's human rights violation activities in Belarus by the British and Swiss governments.

On June 10, 2014, a Georgian national was involved in hijacking a Belavia airline in the Minsk-Kutaisi flight route. AG negotiators were involved in getting him to surrender himself before he was eventually arrested.

On October 31, 2014, AG operators participated in an exercise with the Belarusian Ministry of Emergency Situations. On November 29, 2014, AG participated in anti-terrorist exercises due to the World Ice Hockey Championship Games being held at Minsk alongside the Belarusian Special Rapid Response Unit (SOBR).

On June 20, 2017, AG operators participated in an anti-terrorist operation exercise at Minsk National Airport in recapturing a hijacked Boeing 737.

Alpha Group celebrated its 30th anniversary on March 3, 2020.

On July 29, 2020, AG operators alongside Minsk police arrested 32 persons from the Wagner Group after they arrived in Minsk from July 24 to July 25 under allegations of planning to participate in destabilization activities before the upcoming 2020 presidential elections.

On August 9, 2020, it was reported that AG operators were deployed to intervene against the growing protests towards President Lukashenko. On August 16, 2020, Minsk-based AG veterans have released a statement to condemn violence used against the protests.

On 6 November 2020, the Council of the European Union included Alpha's commander Col. Sergei Zubkov in the list of persons and entities subject to restrictive measures set out in Annex I to Regulation (EC) No 765/2006. Zubkov was also sanctioned by the United Kingdom, and Canada. On 24 November, Iceland, Liechtenstein, Norway, North Macedonia, Montenegro and Albania aligned themselves with the November EU sanctions against 15 Belarusian individuals, while Switzerland did the same on 11 December.

On 23 December 2020, the unit was officially listed under the US Department of the Treasury's Office of Foreign Assets Control (OFAC) (Specially Designated Nationals and Blocked Persons List) due to being regime actors. On 21 June 2021, Col. Zubkov, the commander of the unit, was also added to the SDN list.

Since 2022, Alfa is also under the sanctions of the EU, Switzerland and Japan.

== Requirements ==
According to Colonel Oleg Chernyshev, 80% of its potential recruits are experienced personnel from other Belarusian law enforcement agencies while others are trained athletes. Other potential recruits come from the ranks of the Belarusian SSO. The operator's average age, after being recruited, is usually at 27 years. According to Belarus Today, most AG operators do not mention to their immediate families that they are serving in the unit, but they are made aware that they're with the KGB.

A recruit is placed through interviews and lie detector tests in order to remove anyone who is motivated to join AG for financial or vanity reasons.

Women are not allowed to serve in the unit.

== Training ==
Once in training, AG recruits study laws and regulations regarding the activities of the KGB before they are trained in weapons and tactics. These are taught by experienced AG operators who are in the unit for at least five years. Any recruit who fails the tests are allowed to retake it. AG recruits are awarded dark blue berets once they pass.

AG trains with the FSB's CSN, URNA, Cobra and various German and Italian counter-terrorism units.

== Equipment ==
=== Weapons ===
AG purchased Glock 17s in the 2000s in order to replace their Soviet and Russian-made Makarov PM pistols. The SIG-Sauer P226 was also acquired by AG alongside the SOBR, Almaz, OCAM and the SBP in March 2012. These are chambered in 9x19mm like the Glocks.

The HK MP5A3 serves as the main submachine gun. There are indications that the latter are Turkish-made MP5s under MKE.

The Benelli M4 and Mossberg 500 is used by AG as their primary shotgun.

The Sako TRG and the Accuracy International AX 338 are used by the unit when snipers are deployed.

=== Gear ===
AG operators are known to wear Crye Precision G2/G3 Ranger Green clothing.

=== Vehicles ===
AG is known to have access to armored vehicles, including the Bogdan Bars armored car. They also use armored vehicles outfitted with the MARS assault ladder system when conducting raids on hijacked airplanes.
