= Valery Vakulchik =

Belarusian intelligence officer

- Валерый Вакульчык
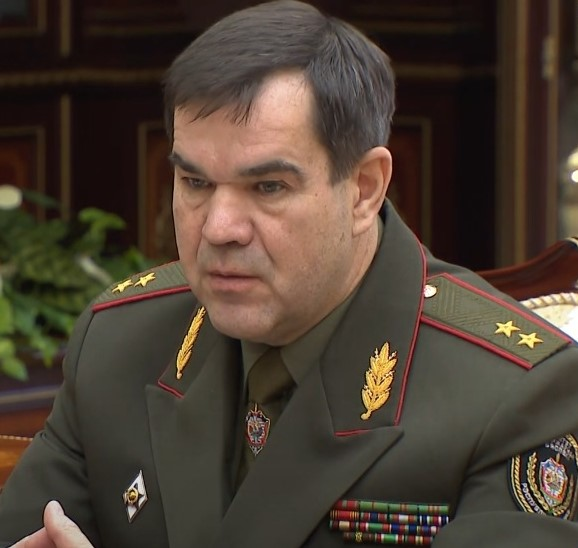

State Secretary of Security Council of Belarus
- In office 3 September 2020 – 29 October 2020
- President: Alexander Lukashenko
- Preceded by: Andrei Ravkov
- Succeeded by: Alexander Volfovich

Chairman of State Security Committee of the Republic of Belarus
- In office 16 November 2012 – 3 September 2020
- President: Alexander Lukashenko
- Preceded by: Vadim Zaytsev
- Succeeded by: Ivan Tertel

Chairman of Investigative Committee of Belarus
- In office 24 October 2011 – 16 November 2012
- President: Alexander Lukashenko
- Preceded by: Position established
- Succeeded by: Valentin Shaev

Personal details
- Born: 19 June 1964 (age 62) Radostovo, Drahichyn District, Belarusian SSR
- Parents: Pavel Vakulchik (father); Maria Vakulchik (mother)
- Education: Kharkov Guards Higher Tank Command School (1985); Higher Courses of the KGB (1992); Academy of Public Administration in Belarus (2011)

Valery Pavlovich Vakulchik (Belarusian: Валерый Паўлавіч Вакульчык, Russian: Валерий Павлович Вакульчик, born 19 June 1964) is a Belarusian civil servant and soldier. He was the Chairman of State Security Committee of the Republic of Belarus (KGB, SSCRB) from November 16, 2012, to September 3, 2020. Vakulchik was also Secretary of the State Security Council of the Republic of Belarus from September 3, 2020, to October 29, 2020.

== Biography ==
Vakulchik was born on June 19, 1964, in Radostovo, Drahichyn District, Brest Region. His father, Pavel Denisovich Vakulchik, worked as the director of the collective farm "Red Partisan" (1971-1986). His mother, Maria Alekseevna, worked as a village teacher and director of a school in the village of Lipniki. He is the oldest brother of his sister Galina and his brother Sergey.

== Education and career ==
Vakulchik graduated from Radostovskaya high school. In 1985 he graduated from the Kharkov Guards Higher Tank Command School. In 1992 he graduated from the Higher courses of military counterintelligence of the SSCRB, and in 2011 the Academy of Public Administration under the President of the Republic of Belarus.

From 1985 to 1991 he served in the Armed Forces of the USSR.

From 1991 to 2008 he served in the state security bodies of the Republic of Belarus. He started his career in the Brest border detachment. He was the head of the SSCRB military counterintelligence department in the border troops.

Since May 2008 Vakulchik served as Head of the Operational Analytical Center under the President of the Republic of Belarus.

On October 24, 2011, he was appointed as chairman of the Investigative Committee of the Republic of Belarus.

On November 16, 2012, he was appointed chairman of the KGB.

From March 7, 2013 to May 16, 2017, he headed the Belarusian Biathlon Federation, of which he is currently the chairman of the supervisory board.

== 2020 Belarus protests ==
On August 31, 2020, Vakulchik was included in the list of persons who were imposed an indefinite ban on entering Latvia, a five-year ban on entering Estonia and a ban on entering Lithuania due to the fact that “by his actions he organized and supported the falsification of the presidential elections on August 9 and subsequently violated suppression of protests", which have not been recognized by the Baltic states.

On September 3, 2020, he was released from the post of the chairman of the KGB and appointed as Secretary of the Security Council of the Republic of Belarus. The presidential decree of September 3, No. 329, in label 3 says: "To assign General-tenant Valery Pavlovich Vakulchik to the State Secretariat of the Security Council of the Republic of Belarus, leaving him in the state security personnel of the Republic of Belarus". He was released from those duties on October 29, 2020, and on the same day he was appointed Assistant to the President of the Republic of Belarus as Inspector for the Brest Region.

On 31 August 2020, Latvia, Lithuania, and Estonia introduced personal sanctions against Vakulchik and other Belarusian officials due to the fact that they "organized and supported the falsification of the presidential elections in Belarus, and supported the violent suppression of peaceful protests".

On October 2, 2020, Vakulchik was banned from entering the European Union. He was also sanctioned by the United Kingdom, Switzerland, and Canada.

== Later career ==
On September 17, 2020, he was appointed as the Aide to the President of Belarus and Inspector for the Brest Region. In May 2025, Lukashenko appointed Vakulchik as the Head of the Office of the Council of Ministers of Belarus.
