= Galina Lukashenko =

First Lady of Belarus since 1994

- Галіна Лукашэнка (Belarusian); Галина Лукашенко (Russian)

First Lady of Belarus
- Current
- Assumed role 20 July 1994
- President: Alexander Lukashenko
- Preceded by: Role established

Personal details
- Born: Galina Rodionovna Zhelnerovich; 1 January 1955 (age 71) Ryzhkovichi, Byelorussian SSR, Soviet Union
- Spouse: Alexander Lukashenko (m. 1975)
- Children: Viktor; Dmitry
- Relatives: Nikolai Lukashenko (stepson)
- Education: Mogilev State Pedagogical Institute (now Mogilev State A. Kuleshov University)

Galina Rodionovna Lukashenko (Note: Belarusian: Галіна Радзівонаўна Лукашэнка, romanized: Halina Radzivonaŭna Łukašenka, alternatively Галіна Радыёнаўна Лукашэнка, Halina Radyjonaŭna Łukašenka, Russian: Галина Родионовна Лукашенко) (née Zhelnerovich; (Note: Russian: Желнерович, Belarusian: Жаўняровіч, romanized: Žaŭniarovič) born 1 January 1955) is the First Lady of Belarus since 1994 as the wife of President Alexander Lukashenko.

== Biography ==
She was born on 1 January 1955 in the family of Rodion Georgievich Zhelnerovich (1928–1983) from Brest and Elena Fedorovna Zhelnerovich (1929–2019) from Slutsk. She met Alexander Lukashenko while still in high school in the village of Ryzhkovichi, and married him in 1975, upon graduation from the Mogilev State Pedagogical Institute (now Mogilev State A. Kuleshov University).

She did not move with her husband to Minsk at the beginning of his presidential career, instead remaining in Shklow. She does not accompany her husband at public events and has rarely been seen with him. The last time when the couple was seen together was the year Lukashenko was elected, on a state visit to Israel.

Lukashenko and her husband are reportedly separated, and she is not the mother of Nikolai Lukashenko, born in 2004.

In 2022, after Russia, a close Belarusian ally, invaded Ukraine, Lukashenko was added to the sanctioned persons list of the United States, Australia, New Zealand and Ukraine. In 2025, she was added to the sanctioned persons list of Canada.
