= Igor Shklyarevsky =

Russian writer (1938–2021)

- Native name: Игорь Шкляревский
- Born: 25 June 1938; Byalynichy, Mogilyov Oblast, BSSR, Soviet Union
- Died: 7 September 2021 (aged 83); Moscow, Russia
- Language: Russian
- Education: Mogilev State A. Kuleshov University; Maxim Gorky Literature Institute
- Years active: 1962–2021

Igor Ivanovich Shklyarevsky (Russian: Игорь Иванович Шкляре́вский; June 25, 1938 – September 8, 2021) was a Russian poet and translator. Shklyarevsky was a 1987 Laureate of the USSR State Prize. He died from complications of COVID-19.
