= Aide to the President of Belarus =

Position in the Presidential Administration of Belarus

An Aide to the President of the Republic of Belarus (Belarusian: Памочнік Прэзідэнта Рэспублікі Беларусь, Russian: Помощник президента Республики Беларусь) is a position in the Presidential Administration of Belarus. Aides are officials who ensure the implementation of the President of Belarus' orders in individual areas of his activities. Aides are appointed to and dismissed from office by decrees of the President of Belarus upon the recommendation of the Chief of Staff to the President of Belarus, who is responsible for the general coordination of their activities. On October 29, 2020, the President Alexander Lukashenko announced the expansion of the powers of his Aides in the Regions of the country, making his aides serve as inspectors whose responsibilities are as follows:

- Monitors the progress of the implementation of the instructions of the head of state and the implementation of state socio-economic policy.
- Analyzes the socio-political situation in the region.
- Prepares visits of the head of state to the region.
- Makes proposals on the selection, appointment to positions and dismissal from positions of senior employees of local executive and administrative bodies, as well as heads of other organizations located in the territory of the region.

== Current aides ==
Name	Term Start	Area(s) of responsibility and other roles
Nikolai Latyshenok	February 6, 2018	General Issues
Nadezhda Kotkovets	July 8, 2026	Inspector for the Mogilev Region
Valery Vakulchik	October 29, 2020	Inspector for the Brest Region
Konstantin Burak	April 17, 2025	Inspector for the Grodno Region
Yuri Valevaty	July 8, 2026	Inspector for the Gomel Region
Sergey Levkovich	January 4, 2024	Inspector for the Vitebsk Region
Alexander Kohkhan	June 13, 2024	Inspector for the Minsk Region
Dmitry Reutsky	July 8, 2026	Inspector for the City of Minsk

== Former aides ==
Name	Term Start	Term End	Area(s) of responsibility and other roles
Nikolai Anayev	1997	1998	Physical Culture, Sports and Tourism Development
Nikolai Anayev	2001	2004	Physical Culture, Sports and Tourism Development
Nikolai Ivanchenko	2003	2003	Chief Inspector for the Minsk Region
Vladimir Puzyrevsky	2003	2003	Chief Inspector for the Brest Region
Leonid Krupets	2003	2003	Chief Inspector for the Vitebsk Region
Viktor Shchetko	2003	2003	Chief Inspector for the Gomel Region
Maria Protaschik	2003	2003	Chief Inspector for the Grodno Region
Oleg Proleskovsky	2003	2003	Head of the Main Ideological Department of the Presidential Administration of Belarus
Gennady Lavrenkov	2003	2003	Chief Inspector for the Mogilev Region
Anatoly Sivak	2003	2003	Chief Inspector for the City of Minsk
Viktor Lukashenko	2005	February 26, 2021	De facto National Security Advisor
Alexander Barsukov	October 29, 2020	March 29, 2024	Chief Inspector for the City of Minsk
Vladimir Kalach	July 29, 2021	May 13, 2024	Chief Inspector for the Minsk Region
Sergei Tkachev	2001	2012	Economic Policy

== See also ==
- Aide to the President of Russia
