= Vadim Zaitsev =

Ukrainian-born Belarusian intelligence officer

- Вадим Юрьевич Зайцев; Вадзім Юр'евіч Зайцаў

Chairman of State Security Committee of the Republic of Belarus
- In office 15 July 2008 – 9 November 2012
- President: Alexander Lukashenko
- Preceded by: Yury Zhadobin
- Succeeded by: Leonid Maltsev

Head of the Main Operations Directorate of the State Border Committee of the Republic of Belarus
- In office September 2007 – 15 July 2008
- President: Alexander Lukashenko

First Deputy Chairman of the State Border Committee of the Republic of Belarus
- In office April 2007 – September 2007
- President: Alexander Lukashenko

Personal details
- Born: Vadim Yurievich Zaitsev; 16 July 1964 (age 62) Zhytomyr oblast, Ukrainian SSR, USSR
- Education: Moscow Border Military School of the KGB (1986); FSB Academy (1997); Military Academy of the General Staff of the Armed Forces of Russia (2004)

Military service
- Rank: Lieutenant general

General Vadim Zaitsev (Russian: Вадим Зайцев, Belarusian: Вадзім Зайцаў, Vadzim Zaytsau; born 16 July 1964) is a Ukrainian-born former head of the KGB of Belarus under president Alexander Lukashenka.

== Biography ==
Zaitsev was born in Zhytomyr oblast, Ukrainian SSR into a family of a Soviet army serviceman.

In 1986 he graduated from the Moscow Border Military School of the KGB and was sent to serve in the Soviet Border Troops.

After the dissolution of the USSR and the restoration of the independence of Belarus, Zaitsev joined the newly created Border troops of Belarus. Zaitsev served as a border post commander until 1994.

In 1997, Zaitsev graduated from the Border Academy of the FSB of Russia and later worked in the Belarus Border Guard headquarters. In 1998 - 2002 he served at various positions in Pinsk Border Detachment, responsible for the Western part of the Belarus–Ukraine border.

He then went to study at the Military Academy of the General Staff of the Armed Forces of Russia in Moscow, graduating in 2004.

In July 2005, Zaitsev Deputy Head of the State Border Committee of Belarus, later becoming First Deputy head of the State Border Committee.

On 15 July 2008 Zaitsev was appointed Chairman of the KGB of Belarus.

In 2012, Zaitsev was dismissed from his post. In 2013, he was appointed CEO of Kosmos TV, a Belarusian-Russian cable TV provider.

== Accusations of and role in political repressions ==
Zaitsev has been head of the KGB, the key secret police of the authoritarian regime of president Alexander Lukashenka, during the mass protests that followed the controversial 2010 Belarusian presidential election, where hundreds of protesters were detained, beaten and tortured; as well as during the 2011 Belarusian protests.

In 2012, Zaitsev was added to a sanctions list of the European Union under the following accusations:

Responsible for transforming the KGB into the main organ of repression of civil society and of the democratic opposition. Responsible for the dissemination, through the media, of false information about the demonstrators on 19 December 2010, alleging that they had brought materials to be used as weapons. He personally threatened the lives and health of the wife and child of former presidential candidate, Andrei Sannikov. He is the main initiator of orders for unlawful harassment of democratic opposition, the torture of political opponents and the mistreatment of prisoners.

In January 2021, EUobserver published an audio file, allegedly being a secret recording of a meeting that took place in 2012 between Zaitsev and several KGB officers, discussing plans to assassinate several exiled enemies of the Lukashenka regime: whistleblower Aleh Alkayeu, colonel Uladzimir Baradach and anti-corruption chief Viachaslau Dudkin, as well as journalist Pavel Sheremet. Sheremet was eventually murdered in a manner as discussed by the persons on the tape four years after the alleged recording date, in 2016.

== See also ==
- List of people and organizations sanctioned in relation to human rights violations in Belarus
