= First Lady of Belarus =

Spouse of the President of Belarus

- Першая лэдзі Беларусі (Belarusian); Первая леди Беларуси (Russian)
- Flag of Belarus
- Incumbent; Galina Lukashenko since 20 July 1994
- Term length: Concurrent with the president's term (unless a divorce or death takes place)
- Precursor: Spouse of the Chairman of the Supreme Council of Belarus
- Inaugural holder: Galina Lukashenko
- Formation: July 20, 1994 (32 years ago)

The First Lady of the Republic of Belarus, also known as the First Lady of Belarus (Belarusian: Першая лэдзі Беларусі, romanized: Pieršaja ledzi Bielarusi; Russian: Первая леди Беларуси, romanized: Pervaya ledi Belarusi) is an unofficial de facto title usually attributed to the wife of the president of Belarus. The first and only person to hold the title is Galina Lukashenko, wife of Alexander Lukashenko. (Note: It is said that Galina Lukashenko has not been living together with Alexander Lukashenko since the start of his tenure as President, but despite this, a divorce was never officiated. As a result of this, she never acted as First Lady and remains only the position's de jure officeholder.)

== History ==
The unofficial de facto position of First Lady of Belarus was created alongside the position of the President of Belarus on July 20, 1994. Its first and incumbent officeholder is Galina Lukashenko. Even though she is First Lady, she has not ever operated as one; Galina Lukashenko refused to move to Minsk during the start of her spouse Alexander Lukashenko's presidency and has lived in the village ever since. Despite the separation, an official divorce was never declared. Galina Lukashenko's only act as First Lady is said to be her participation in a visit of Alexander Lukashenko to Israel in 1994.

== List of First ladies of Belarus (1991–present) ==
No.	Portrait	Name	Marriage date	Period		Length of tenure	President of Belarus (Spouse)	Portrait	Note
1		Galina Lukashenko (née Zhelnerovich); Born: 1 January 1955 (age 71)	m. 1975	20 July 1994	Incumbent	32 years, 1 month and 18 days	Alexander Lukashenko		(Note: A number of countries do not recognize Lukashenko as the legitimate president of Belarus since the 2020 Belarusian presidential election.)

== See also ==
- First Lady
- Belarus
- President of Belarus
