= Belarusian Trade-Economic University of Consumer Cooperation =

Public university in Gomel, Belarus

Coordinates: 52.4064°N 30.9355°E

Belarusian Trade and Economics University of Consumer Cooperatives
- Беларускі гандлёва-эканамічны ўніверсітэт спажывецкай кааперацыі
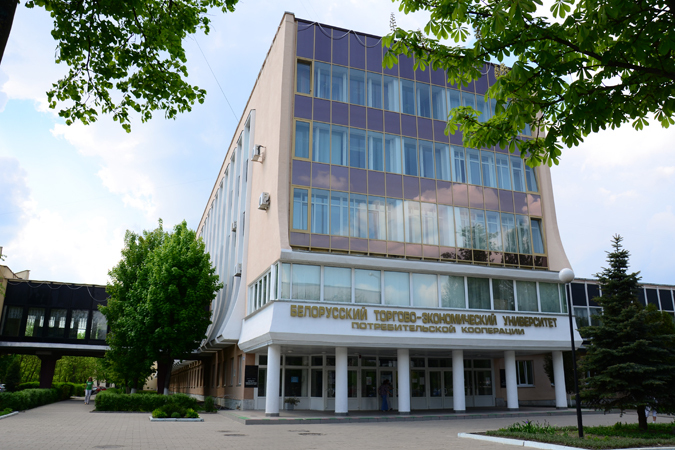
- Type: Public
- Established: 1964
- Rector: Sviatlana Lebedzeva
- Administrative staff: 269
- Location: Gomel, Belarus
- Website: www.i-bteu.by
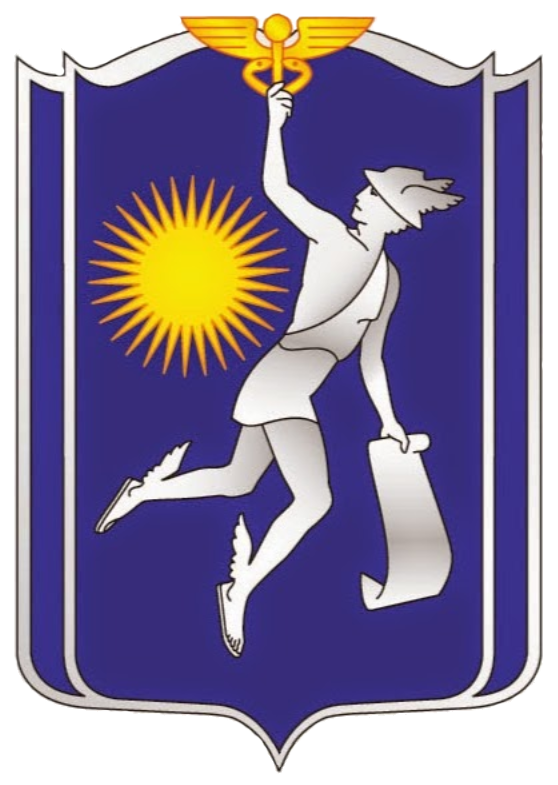

Belarusian Trade-Economic University of Consumer Cooperation is a university in Gomel, Belarus.

== General information about the university ==
Belarusian Trade and Economics University of Consumer Cooperatives (BTEU) is an accredited educational and research center of national and international importance with more than 50-year history. During this time BTEU has trained more than 44 thousand professionals for national economy of the Republic of Belarus as well as for foreign countries.

Belarusian Trade and Economics University of Consumer Cooperatives was established by the Belarusian Republican Union of Consumer Societies (Belcoopsoyuz) which is ascertained in the list of state organizations subordinated to the Council of Ministers of the Republic of Belarus.

BTEU has a status of State Institution of Higher Education. The University has a Special permit (license) of the Ministry of Education of the Republic of Belarus for performing educational activities.

The University has the Certificate on the state registration as the scientific organization.

Since 2010 the University functions according with the certified Quality Management System of education meeting the requirements of STB ISO 9001-2009. In 2014 the University successfully passed recertification of Quality Management System.

BTEU trains specialists in 14 specialties, including 4 directions of specialties and 22 specializations of the 1st level of education and 19 specialties of the 2nd level of education for students of the following forms of training: full-time course (day-time), full-time course (evening-time), correspondence course (distance education).

== History ==
History of Educational Institution “Belarusian Trade and Economics University of Consumer Cooperatives” had its beginning in 1964 with the opening in Gomel of the Consultative unit of Moscow Cooperative Institute of Central Union of Consumer Cooperatives of the USSR (Centrosoyuz). On its basis the Department of Correspondence Course of Moscow Cooperative Institute was opened in 1968, which was reorganized into Gomel branch of the Institute in 1975. In 1979 Gomel branch began to function as an independent institution - Gomel Cooperative Institute of Centrosoyuz.

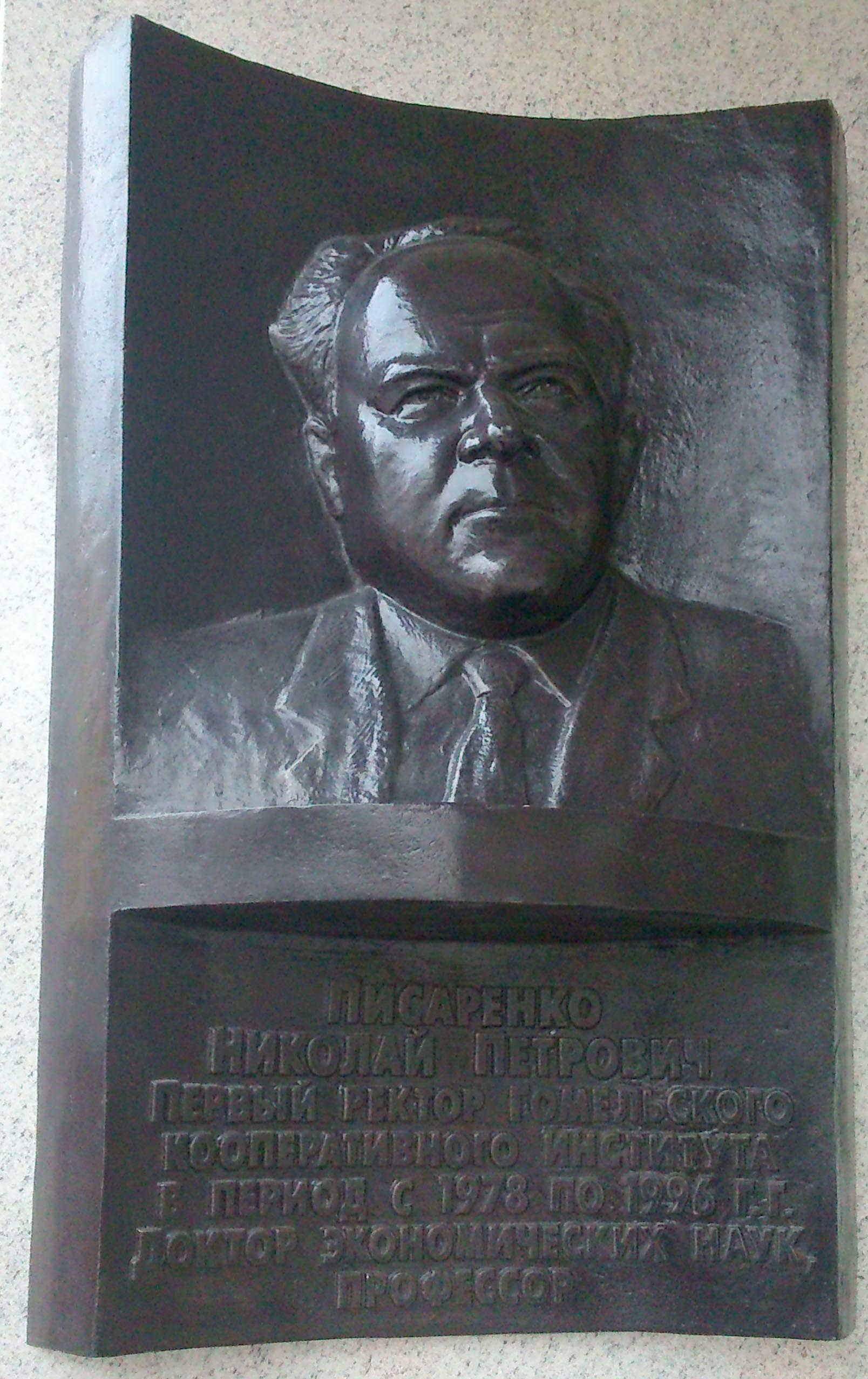
Pisarenko N.P. – the first Rector of BTEU

In 1992 in connection with the termination of activity of Centrosoyuz of the USSR, Gomel Cooperative Institute was handed under the supervision of the Belarusian Republican Union of Consumer Societies. Then, in 1993 Gomel Cooperative Institute of was defined as basic educational institution in the system of cooperative education of the Republic of Belarus including also six educational-industrial complexes of “Vocational-technical school - technical college” and one specialized school.

Belarusian Trade and Economics University of Consumer Cooperatives was awarded the Certificate of Honor of the Council of Ministers of the Republic of Belarus No. 936 d/d October 1, 2014 for the significant contribution to the training of highly qualified specialists for the organizations of consumer cooperatives and national economy.

== Structure ==
Now Belarusian Trade and Economics University of Consumer Cooperatives is a research and educational center.

Structure of the University includes three faculties:

- Faculty of Economics and Management
- Faculty of Accounting and Finance
- Faculty of Commerce

Besides, at the University the following departments are functioning: Faculty of Qualification Improvement and Personnel Retraining, International Relations Department, Department of Distance Learning Technologies and Innovations, Department of Postgraduate Course, Department of Career Guidance of Youth, Department of Coordination of Scientific Projects and Programs.

President of the Republic of Belarus has adopted a number of Decrees affecting the activities of the University thanks to which BTEU and its graduates have benefits similar to benefits provided to graduates of higher education institutions of state-owned legal entity.

== International activity ==
The University devotes attention to development of system of foreign citizens training. BTEU has bilateral cooperation agreements with more than 50 educational institutions and research centers from 15 countries. University trains foreign citizens since 2005.

University's participation in educational projects of the European Union such as ERASMUS MUNDUS, ERASMUS + contributes to the expansion of international cooperation.

As a student of Belarusian Trade and Economics University of Consumer Cooperatives foreign citizens along with citizens of the Republic of Belarus may start their international career and upon graduation from BTEU and get two or even three diploma – of a Belarusian and a European university:

- Specialist Degree Diploma at Belarusian Trade and Economics University of Consumer Cooperatives;
- Bachelor's Degree Diploma at Varna University of Management (VUM), Bulgaria;
- Bachelor's Degree Diploma at Cardiff Metropolitan University, United Kingdom.

International cooperation with leading universities of the Russian Federation is being actively developed. In frames of concluded mobility agreements students of Belarusian Trade and Economics University of Consumer Cooperatives can have a course of exchange education and obtain a certificate upon completion of the course at the following universities of the Russian Federation:

- Belgorod University of Cooperation, Economy and Law;
- Russian University of Cooperation;
- Peter the Great St. Petersburg Polytechnic University.
