= Investigative Committee of Belarus =

Belarusian government preliminary inquiry body

The Investigative Committee of Belarus (Belarusian: Следчы камітэт Рэспублікі Беларусь, romanized: Sliedčy kamitet Respubliki Bielaruś; Russian: Следственный комитет Республики Беларусь, romanized: Sledstvennyy komitet Respubliki Belarus') is a preliminary inquiry body that reports to the President of Belarus.

== International sanctions ==
In August 2020, the chairman of the ICB Ivan Noskevich was targeted by Lithuanian sanctions, along with 30 other high-ranking officials of the Belarus government. Ivan Noskevich on November 6, 2020 was added to the EU sanctions list.

In late 2020, Noskevich and the deputy chairmen were included in the sanctions lists of the European Union, the United Kingdom, Switzerland and Canada.

On August 9, 2021, the Investigative Committee, its chairman Dzmitry Hara, as well as his deputies were added to the Specially Designated Nationals and Blocked Persons List by the United States Department of the Treasury. Earlier in summer 2020, Hara had been already sanctioned by the European Union and Switzerland.

== Leadership ==
- Valery Vakulchik (24 October 2011 – 16 November 2012)
- Valentin Shaev (16 November 2012 – 4 November, 2015)
- Ivan Noskevich (10 November 2015 – 11 March 2021)
- Dzmitry Hara (since 11 March 2021)

== Political repressions ==
Since August 9, 2020 to July 1, 2022 units of the Investigative Committee of Belarus initiated more than 11 thousand criminal cases on extremist crimes. The Investigative Committee considers all those who criticize the current government to be extremists.
