= Faculty of International Relations, Belarusian State University =

International relations school

Coordinates: 53°53′32″N 27°32′53″E

Faculty of International Relations
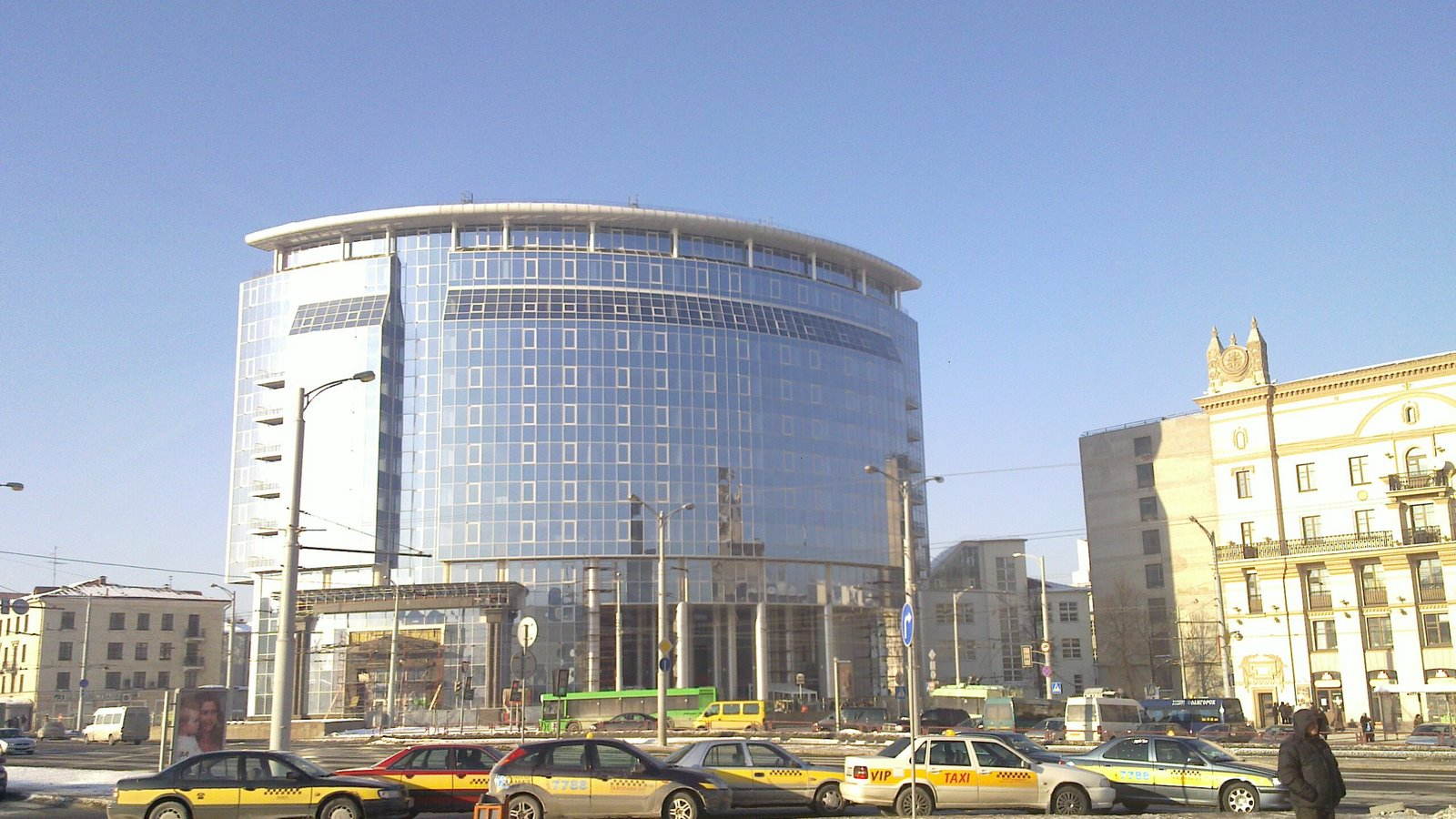
- Established: 1995
- Affiliations: Belarusian State University
- Dean: Prof. Viktar Shadurski
- Administrative staff: 250
- Location: (Belarus) Minsk, Minsk, Belarus
- Website: fir.bsu.by

The Faculty of International Relations of the Belarusian State University (Belarusian: Факультэт міжнародных адносін, romanized: Fakuĺtet mižnarodnych adnosin) was founded in 1995. The faculty trains specialists in the following areas: international relations, international law, world economy, management of international tourism, customs, linguistics and area studies, modern foreign languages and cultural studies.

The dean of the faculty is Shadursky Victor Gennadievich, a professor of historical sciences.

== History ==
The faculty was established on 1 October 1995. In late 2003, at the Department of Oriental Languages, the National Center for Chinese Studies "Character" (from the 2006 Confucius Institute) was opened. In 2009, a center was opened at the Faculty of Korean Studies.

== Building ==
The building is located in the center of Minsk, near the railway station and the main building of the Belarusian State University, on the streets of Leningradskaya. The new 13-story building was erected after ten years in 2012. The opening ceremony took place on 1 September 2012 with the participation of President of Belarus Alexander Lukashenko.
