= NTV-Belarus =

Belarusian state-owned television channel

NTV-Belarus НТВ-Беларусь
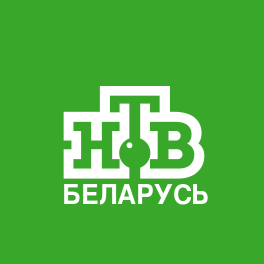
- Country: Belarus
- Broadcast area: Belarus
- Headquarters: Minsk, Belarus

Programming
- Language: Russian
- Picture format: 1080i (16:9 HDTV)

Ownership
- Owner: National State Television and Radio Company of the Republic of Belarus
- Sister channels: Belarus 1 Belarus 2 Belarus 3 Belarus 4 Belarus 5 Belarus 24; The First News Channel

History
- Launched: 4 July 2006; 20 years ago

Links
- Website: tvr.by

NTV-Belarus (Belarusian: НТВ-Беларусь) is the Belarusian version of Russian channel NTV, owned by Belteleradio. Created following a two-way agreement between it and NTV's owner in December 2005, it started broadcasting on 4 July 2006. It relays NTV's original productions and tries to emulate the Russian channel as much as possible. This, in the early years, was complemented by Russian and international feature films Belteleradio had rights to.

== History ==
NTV was broadcast in Belarus since 1994. In 2000, Belteleradio began inserting its advertising slots illegally on the NTV relays. Negotiations between NTV and the BTRC did not finish in an agreement, limiting the channel's airtime in Belarus (starting at 8am and ending earlier than Moscow), meaning some of the network's movies, such as action and erotic titles, were not broadcast or were filled with other programs.

An agreement between the parties was settled in December 2005 and the new NTV-Belarus channel started broadcasting on 4 July 2006. Initially, BTRC decided not to broadcast NTV's own TV series, which considered them as being "too bloody". The Russian programs were complemented by international output which Belteleradio acquired.

The introduction of NTV-Belarus led to the gradual removal of both the original Russian feed and the international feed. Cable companies were instructed to remove NTV effective January 2007 to safeguard the local channel. From 25 December 2006, the channel started at an earlier time (8am) with This Morning, which, up until then, was not seen in Belarus. Closedown was at midnight on weekdays and after midnight on weekends, and the channel started airing commercials throughout the week; up until then, only from Fridays to Sundays. On 1 April 2009, NTV Mir was removed from Belarusian cable companies due to "financial reasons" and was replaced by NTV-Belarus.

On 11 February 2019, NTV-Belarus started broadcasting in high definition.
