= List of television channels in Belarus =

Television in Belarus was introduced in 1956, when Belarus was still known as the Byelorussian SSR. This is a list of television stations broadcasting in Belarus.

== Television channels ==
Owner	Name	Logo	Launched	Picture format	Notes
TVP International Media Centre	Belsat		10 December 2007	1080p60 (HDTV)	Independent channel
Consortium "Miedyjarynak" (Euroradio, Malanka Media, "Bielarusy i rynak")	Belarus Tomorrow		12 February 2024	1080p60 (HDTV)	Independent channel
Belarus National State Broadcasting	Belarus-1		1956	1080i (HDTV)	All-thematic channel
Belarus National State Broadcasting	Belarus-2		2003	1080i (HDTV)	Entertainment channel
Belarus National State Broadcasting	Belarus-3		2013	1080i (HDTV)	Cultural channel
Belarus National State Broadcasting	Belarus-4		2015	1080i (HDTV)	Regional channel in Viciebsk, Mahiloŭ, Homiel, Bieraście and Horadnia
Belarus National State Broadcasting	Belarus-5		2013	1080i (HDTV)	Sports channel
Belarus National State Broadcasting	Pervyi informatsionnyi		2024	1080i (HDTV)	Propaganda channel
Belarus National State Broadcasting	Belarus-24		2005	1080i (HDTV)	Satellite channel
Belarus National State Broadcasting	Viciebsk		2014	1080i (HDTV)	Local channel in Viciebsk
Belarus National State Broadcasting	NTV-Belarus		2006	1080i (HDTV)	Localized version of NTV (Russia)
Ministry of Information Belarus (51%); Belarusbank (29%); «Factory of information technology" (20%)	ONT		2002	1080i (HDTV)	Localized version of Channel One (Russia)
Government of Minsk	STV (Capital Television)		2001	1080i (HDTV)	Propagandists programs, general entertainment. Retranslates programs of REN TV (Russia)
Government of Minsk	Sport TV		2025	1080i (HDTV)	Sports channel
Government of Minsk	RTR-Belarus		2008	1080i (HDTV)	Localized version of RTR Planeta (Russia)
MIR State Broadcasting (Russia)	Mir		2003	1080i (HDTV)	
MIR State Broadcasting (Russia)	Mir 24		2010	1080i (HDTV)	
Trio Media	BelMuzTV		2006	16:9, 576i (SDTV)	Localized version of Pyatnitsa! (Russia)
Trio Media	TNT-International (Belarus)		2015	16:9, 576i (SDTV)	Localized version of TNT (Russia)
Trio Media	TV-3 (ТВ-3)		2017	4:3, 576i (SDTV)	Localized version of TV-3 (Russia)
8 Kanal	8 Kanal (8 канал)		1996/2002	1080i (HDTV)	General entertainment
Beltelecom	Jasnae TV (ЯСНАе ТВ)		2019	1080i (HDTV)	Entertainment and sports channel
Beltelecom	Tekh let TV (Тех лет ТВ)		2025	1080i (HDTV)	Entertainment retro channel
Vector TV state company	Zvyazda (Звязда)		2001/2019	1080i (HDTV)	Militaristic propaganda channel
Ministry of Defence	Voen TV (Воен ТВ)		2026	1080i (HDTV)	Militaristic propaganda channel
Cosmos Telecom	Cinema		2008	1080i (HDTV)	Film and serial channel
Belviasat	+TV		2009	1080i (HDTV)	Localized version of TV Center (Russia)
Europa Plus TV Belarus company	Europa Plus TV Belarus		2013	16:9, 576i (SDTV)	Localized version of Europa Plus TV (Russia)
Nashe TV	RU.TV Belarus		2013	16:9, 576i (SDTV)	Localized version of RU.TV (Russia)
MBG Bel	Zal 13 (Nash Kinopokaz)		2024	1080i (HDTV)	Localized version of "Nash Kinopokaz" (Russia)
