= Azaryonok =

Azarenok or Azaryonok (Russian: Азарёнок, Belarusian: Азаронак, romanized: Azaronak) is an East Slavic surname. Notable people with the surname include:

- Grigory Azarenok (born 1995), Belarusian journalist
- Ruslan Azarenok (born 1975), Belarusian football player and coach
- Viktor Azarenok (born 1974), Belarusian politician
- Yuri Azarenok (1965–2025), Belarusian documentary filmmaker and public figure

== See also ==
- Azarenka/Azarenko
- Azarenkov
- Azarov
