= Yury Koziyatko =

Belarusian politician and propagandist

Yury Vasilyevich Koziyatko
- Юрий Васильевич Козиятко

Chairman of Capital TV
- In office 2005–2018
- President: Alexander Lukashenko
- Preceded by: Alexander Zimovsky

Member of the Council of the Republic of Belarus
- Incumbent
- Assumed office 2012
- President: Alexander Lukashenko

Chairman of ONT
- In office 2003–2005
- President: Alexander Lukashenko

Yury Koziyatko (Russian: Юрий Васильевич Козиятко, Belarusian: Юры Казіятка, born April 24, 1964, in Brest, Belarus) is a Belarusian politician, TV presenter and blogger.

== Biography ==
=== Early years and education ===
Yury Koziyatko born on April 24, 1964, in Brest. He graduated from the Kurgan Higher Military-Political Aviation School in Kurgan, Russia. During his service at the Soviet Army, he worked as a military journalist in a newspaper of the Soviet Pacific Fleet and as a TV host in Vladivostok, Russia.

=== Career ===
Belarusian Association of Journalists refers to Koziyatko as 'the third main propagandist in Belarus' after Yury Azarenok and Alexander Zimovsky.

In the early 1990s Koziyatko quit the Russian Army and returned to Belarus. He first worked for a Belarusian military TV production company, in 1996 he switched to the main state-owned TV channel Belarus-1 where he became a political commentator and hosted two shows, "Topic of the Day", and "Panorama Saturday".

In 2003, he became Chairman at the state-owned TV channel ONT. In 2004, he released a 12-series documentary 'Noveyshaya Istoriya' ('Recent History') where he supported and justified all Lukashenko's actions. The film enjoyed state support and was shown at screenings organised by ideological state officials, which were compulsory for employees of state owned enterprises to attend. In December 2005, Koziyatko was appointed Chairman at a different state-owned TV channel, Capital TV.

In 2012, Koziyatko was appointed member of the upper chamber of the Parliament of Belarus.

In September 2016, Koziyatko was awarded the Order of Honour.

In February 2018, he was dismissed from Capital TV and appointed deputy director of the "Minsk-Novosti" agency. From "Minsk-Novosti", Koziyatko was dismissed in 2018.

He has been a blogger since 2022, running his 'Picture of the World' channel. The blog is dedicated to Belarus and covers its history, landmarks and places of interest.

== Accusations, EU sanctions ==
In 2011, after the wave of repressions that followed the 2010 presidential election, Yury Koziyatko and several other top managers and employees of major state media became subject to an EU travel ban and asset freeze as part of a sanctions list of 208 individuals responsible for political repressions, electoral fraud and propaganda in Belarus. The sanctions were lifted in 2016.

According to the EU Council's decision, Koziyatko's TV show was described as "an instrument of state propaganda which supports and justifies the repression of the democratic opposition and of civil society. Democratic opposition and civil society are systematically highlighted in a negative and derogatory way using falsified information. He was particularly active in this regard after the crackdown on peaceful demonstrations on 19 December 2010 and on subsequent protests.

== See also ==
- List of people and organizations sanctioned in relation to human rights violations in Belarus
- National State Television and Radio Company of the Republic of Belarus
