= Alexander Zimovsky =

Belarusian politician and television host

- Александр Леонидович Зимовский

Chairman of the BTRC
- In office 2005–2010
- President: Alexander Lukashenko
- Succeeded by: Gennady Davydko

Member of the House of Representatives of Belarus
- In office 2004–2008
- President: Alexander Lukashenko

Chairman of CTV
- In office 2002–2005
- President: Alexander Lukashenko
- Succeeded by: Yury Koziyatko

Alexander Zimovsky (Russian: Александр Леонидович Зимовский, Belarusian: Аляксандр Зімоўскі, Aliaksandr Zimouski; born January 10, 1961) is a Belarusian politician and former media executive and TV host, accused of being one of the key propagandists of the authoritarian regime of Alexander Lukashenko.

== Biography ==
According to public data, A. Zimovsky was born in Germany. In 1979 - 1984 he served in the Soviet Army. During his service, he studied three years at the Lviv Higher Military Political School, without graduating. After that, he held several minor journalistic jobs in Belarus.

From 1995 to 2001 A. Zimovsky hosted a political TV show on the central Belarusian TV channel Belarus-1.

In 2002 he was appointed Chairman of the state-owned TV channel CTV.

In 2004, Zimovsky was appointed member of the upper house of the Belarusian parliament. He held this position till 2008.

In 2007, Zimovsky graduated from the Polesian State University with a degree in banking.

Between 2005 and 2010, Zimovsky was Chairman of the National State Television and Radio Company of the Republic of Belarus.

Since 2011, Zimovsky lives in Russia and works as a media consultant.

== Accusations, EU sanctions ==
In 2011, after the wave of repressions that followed the 2010 presidential election, Zimovsky and several other top managers and employees of major state media became subject to an EU travel ban and asset freeze as part of a sanctions list of 208 individuals responsible for political repressions, electoral fraud and propaganda in Belarus. The sanctions were lifted in 2016.

According to the EU Council's decision, Alexander Zimovsky “was the main actor of the regime's propaganda until December 2010, by systematically denigrating the opposition and justifying gross violations of human rights and recurrent crackdowns on the opposition and on civil society in Belarus.”

Besides that, Zimovsky remains one of the few people and the only media worker on the sanctions list of the United States.

== See also ==
- List of people and organizations sanctioned in relation to human rights violations in Belarus
