= Gennady Davydko =

Belarusian politician and propagandist

Gennady Bronislavovich Davydko
- Генадзь Давыдзька; Генна́дий Давы́дько
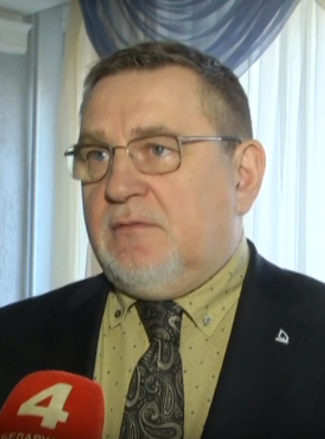

Chairman of the BTRC
- In office 2010–2018
- President: Alexander Lukashenko
- Preceded by: Alexander Zimovsky
- Succeeded by: Ivan Eismont

Leader of Belaya Rus
- In office January 19, 2018 – June 18, 2022
- Preceded by: Alexander Radkov
- Succeeded by: Oleg Romanov

Member of the House of Representatives of Belarus
- In office November 16, 2004 – October 18, 2012
- President: Alexander Lukashenko

Personal details
- Born: September 29, 1955 (68 years old) Senno, Byelorussian Soviet Socialist Republic, Soviet Union
- Party: Belaya Rus

Gennady Davydko (Russian: Генна́дий Бронисла́вович Давы́дько, Belarusian: Генадзь Браніслававіч Давыдзька, Hienadz Davydzka) is a Belarusian politician and TV propagandist, included in the sanctions list of the European Union in 2011 - 2016.

== Biography ==
Gennady Davydko was born in Sianno, Byelorussian Soviet Socialist Republic (now Belarus).

He grew up in the Russian Far East. He graduated from the Far Eastern Pedagogical Institute of Arts in Vladivostok, Russia as a drama producer, and from the Belarusian State Academy of Arts. He started his career at the Maxim Gorky Drama Theatre in Orenburg, Russia.

After military service, he worked as an actor in the Vincent Dunin-Marcinkievich Drama and Comedy Theatre in Mahiliou.

In 1981, Davydko became an actor at the Yanka Kupala National Academic Theatre in Minsk. In 1997, he became the theatre's director. During his career, Davydko played minor roles in several Russian and Belarusian movies.

From 2004 to 2012, Davydko was a member of the lower house of the parliament of Belarus. The parliamentary elections of 2004 and 2008 were not recognized as free and fair by the OSCE, the United States and the European Union.

Davydko is also an advisor on cultural issues and co-chair of the Listapad Film Festival.

Davydko became chairman of the National State Television and Radio Company of the Republic of Belarus on December 28, 2010. As head of the state television, Davydko personally read the background text in a widely known propaganda film denigrating the democratic opposition. In 2014, he was the head of professional jury who selected the artists and songs for national selection of an entrant to Eurovision Song Contest 2014.

In January 2018, he was elected the head of Belarusian public association Belaya Rus. In February 2018, Davydko ceased to be a state television chairman and was appointed to the Council of the Republic instead.

In 2019, he was again elected to the House of Representatives.

== Accusations, EU sanctions ==
In 2011, after the wave of repressions that followed the 2010 presidential election, Davydko and several other top managers and employees of major state media became subject to an EU travel ban and asset freeze as part of a sanctions list of 208 individuals responsible for political repressions, electoral fraud and propaganda in Belarus. The sanctions were lifted in 2016.

According to the EU Council's decision, Gennady Davydko was "responsible for promoting state propaganda on TV, propaganda which supported and justified the repression of the democratic opposition and of civil society after the elections in December 2010. Democratic opposition and civil society are systematically highlighted in a negative and derogatory way using falsified information."

On 21 June 2021, Davydko was sanctioned again by the EU. He was later sanctioned by Switzerland and specially designated by the US.

== See also ==
- List of people and organizations sanctioned in relation to human rights violations in Belarus
- National State Television and Radio Company of the Republic of Belarus
