= Presidential Administration of Belarus =

State administrative body of Belarus

Administration of the President of the Republic of Belarus
- Адміністрацыя Прэзыдэнта Рэспублікі Беларусь
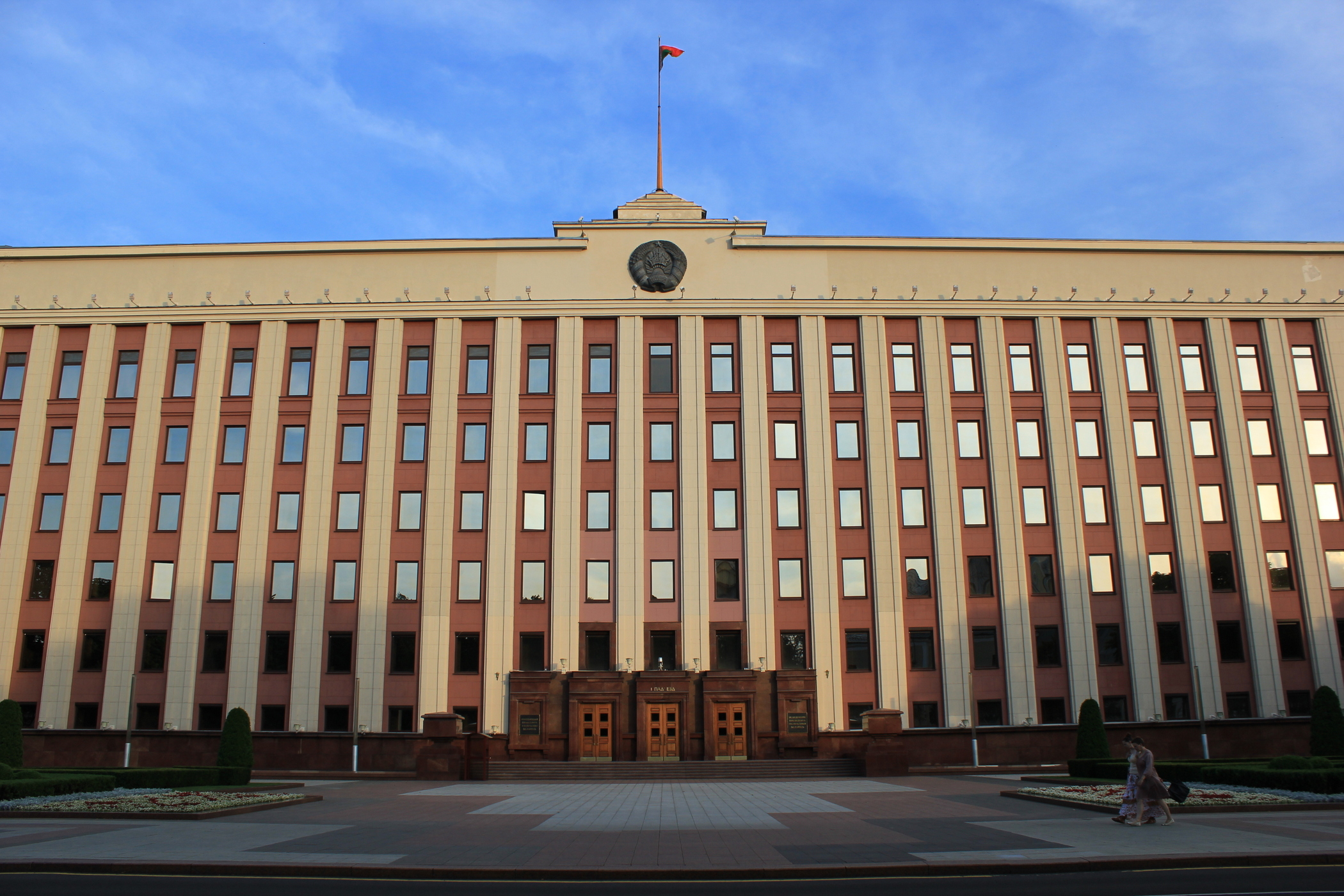
- The office of the Presidential Administration of Belarus in Minsk

Agency overview
- Formed: 22 July 1994
- Headquarters: Belarus, Minsk, 43 Kirova Street
- Agency executive: Dmitry Krutoi, Administration Head
- Website: president.gov.by

The Administration of the President of the Republic of Belarus (Russian: Администрация Президента Республики Беларусь, Belarusian: Адміністрацыя Прэзыдэнта Рэспублікі Беларусь, romanized: Administracyja Prezydenta Respubliki Bielaruś) is a state administration body of Belarus that supervises the implementation of the resolutions of the President.

== Functions ==
The Presidential Administration has been created following a constitutional reform and the first presidential election in Belarus held in 1994. Alexander Lukashenko has been occupying the post as President of Belarus ever since. He has been accused of installing an authoritarian regime in Belarus. No other presidential elections in the country have been considered free and fair by the United States and the European Union.

The Administration of the President plays a key role in the Belarusian authoritarian system of state governance. The administration organizes the interaction between the President and legislative, executive and judicial bodies, local authorities, and mass media; provides analytical support to the President of Belarus. It drafts presidential decisions and legislation that is subsequently formally approved by the Parliament of Belarus.

== Current leadership ==
As of 10 July 2025

- Dmitry Krutoi, Head of the Presidential Administration
- Vladimir Pertsov, First Deputy Head of the Presidential Administration
- Olga Chupris, Deputy Head of the Presidential Administration
- Dmitry Matusevich, Deputy Head of the Presidential Administration

== Accusations ==
Given the strategic importance of the Presidential Administration in the Belarusian system of power, senior officials of the administration of President Lukashenko have been accused by the United States and the European Union of orchestrating state propaganda that has been justifying political repressions and electoral fraud.

After the presidential elections of 2006, 2010 and 2020 top officials from the Presidential Administration have been included in EU and US sanctions lists and thereby made subject to travel bans and asset freeze.

=== Officials of the Presidential Administration sanctioned by the US and EU ===
==== United States sanctions list ====
- Natalia Petkevich, First Deputy Head of the Administration of the President of Belarus in 2004–2010
- Alexander Radkov, Former Minister of Education, then leader of the Belaya Rus movement and Deputy Head of the Presidential Administration
- Vladimir Rusakevich, Deputy Head of the Presidential Administration

==== EU sanctions list following the 2006 Belarusian presidential election ====
- Gennady Nevyglas, Head of the Presidential Administration
- Natalia Petkevich, Deputy Head of the Presidential Administration
- Anatoly Rubinov, Deputy Head of the Presidential Administration in charge of media and ideology
- Oleg Proleskovsky, Head of the Main Ideological department at the Presidential Administration

==== EU sanctions list following the 2010 Belarusian presidential election ====
- Vsevolod Yanchevsky, Head of the Ideological Department of the Presidential Administration and Assistant to the President
- Oleg Proleskovsky, former Deputy Head of the Presidential Administration, former Head of General Directorate for Ideology and Centre of Analysis and Information
- Anatoly Rubinov, former Deputy Head of the Presidential Administration in charge of Media and Ideology (in 2006–2008)
- Alexander Bazanov, Director of the Information and Analytical Centre of the Presidential Administration
- Pavel Yakubovich, Editor-in-Chief of Sovetskaya Belorussiya – Belarus' Segodnya, the official newspaper of the Presidential Administration
- Vadim Gigin, Editor-in-Chief of Belaruskaya Dumka, a monthly journal of the Presidential Administration
- Alexei Gusev, former First Deputy Director of the Information and Analytical Centre of the Presidential Administration
- Alena Kolas, Deputy Director of the Information and Analytical Centre of the Presidential Administration
- Lev Krishtapovich, Deputy Director of the Information and Analytical Centre of the Presidential Administration

==== Remaining EU sanctions list after 2016 ====
- Victor Sheiman, Head of the Management Department of the Presidential Administration. Accused of being responsible for the unresolved disappearances of opposition leaders Yury Zakharenko, Victor Gonchar, opposition sponsor Anatoly Krasovsky, and journalist Dmitry Zavadsky in 1999–2000. Also included in EU's previous lists.
- Yury Sivakov, former Deputy Head of the Presidential Administration. Accused of having orchestrated the unresolved disappearances of Yury Zakharenko, Victor Gonchar, Anatoly Krasovsky and Dmitry Zavadsky in 1999–2000. Also included in EU's previous lists.

==== Sanctions after the 2020 presidential election ====
- Igor Sergeenko, Head of the Presidential Administration (2019–2024), EU sanctions
- Maxim Ryzhenkov, First Deputy Head of the Presidential Administration (2016–2024), EU sanctions
- Andrei Kuntsevich, Deputy Head of the Presidential Administration (2019–2021), Baltic states sanctions
- Olga Chupris, Deputy Head of the Presidential Administration, Baltic states sanctions
- Dmitry Krutoi, Deputy Head of the Presidential Administration (2020–2022), Head of the Presidential Administration since 2024, Baltic states sanctions
- Igor Lutski, Deputy Head of the Presidential Administration (2021—2024), EU sanctions
- Natalia Petkevich, First Deputy Head of the Presidential Administration since 2024, US sanctions since 2006
- Valery Ivanov, Head of the Management Department of the Presidential Administration (2021–2022), Canadian sanctions
- Viktor Sheiman, Head of the Management Department of the Presidential Administration (2013–2021), EU and US sanctions since 2000s
- Alexander Radkov, First Deputy Head of the Presidential Administration (2010–2014), US sanctions since 2006

== Former staff ==
- Ural Latypov, Bashkortostan-born KGB officer, later foreign minister of Belarus, head of the Presidential Administration in 2001-2004
