= Pavel Yakubovich =

Belarusian journalist and politician

Pavel Izotovich Yakubovich
- Павел Изотович Якубович

Chief editor of Sovetskaya Belorussiya – Belarus' Segodnya
- In office 1995–2018
- President: Alexander Lukashenko
- Preceded by: Mikalay Galko
- Succeeded by: Dzmitry Zhuk

Member of the Council of the Republic of Belarus
- Incumbent
- Assumed office 2011
- President: Alexander Lukashenko

Pavel Yakubovich (Russian: Павел Изотович Якубович, born September 23, 1946, in Unecha or Starodub, Russia) is a Belarusian journalist and politician. As the chief editor of Belarus Today, the main official newspaper of Belarus, he has been accused of propaganda in favour of the authoritarian regime of president Alexander Lukashenko.

== Biography ==
After graduating from school he worked as a prison ward and construction worker, and later did his military service in the Soviet Internal Troops.

He soon began his work as a military journalist and joined the Communist Party of the Soviet Union.

In 1973, Yakubovich graduated from the Belarusian State University. He worked as journalist and editor in several Belarusian newspapers: Znamya Yunosti (1977–1987), Krynitsa (1987–1995).

In 1995 he was appointed deputy chief editor and then chief editor of Sovetskaya Belorussiya, the official publication of the Presidential Administration of Belarus. He has been chief editor of the newspaper, later renamed Sovetskaya Belorussiya – Belarus' Segodnya, since then.

In 2011, president Lukashenko appointed Pavel Yakubovich member of the upper chamber of the Parliament of Belarus.

Yakubovich has received several state awards, including Order of Francysk Skaryna.

== Controversy ==
=== EU sanctions ===
In 2011, after the wave of repressions that followed the 2010 presidential election, Pavel Yakubovich and several other top managers and employees of major state media became subject to an EU travel ban and asset freeze as part of a sanctions list of 208 individuals responsible for political repressions, electoral fraud and propaganda in Belarus. The sanctions were lifted in 2016.

=== Accusations ===
According to the EU Council's decision, Pavel Yakubovich was "one of the most vocal and influential members of the state propaganda machine in the printed press. He has supported and justified the repression of the democratic opposition and of civil society, which are systematically highlighted in a negative and derogatory way using falsified information. He was particularly active in this regard after the crackdown on peaceful demonstrations on 19 December 2010 and on subsequent protests."

== Family ==
Pavel Yakubovich is a distant relative of Leonid Yakubovich, the Russian TV host and showman.

== See also ==
- List of people and organizations sanctioned in relation to human rights violations in Belarus
- Sovetskaya Belorussiya – Belarus' Segodnya
- Presidential Administration of Belarus
