= First National Channel of Belarusian Radio =

Radio station

- Country: Belarus

Ownership
- Owner: Belarusian Television and Radio Company

History
- Launch date: 15 November 1925; 100 years ago
- Former names: Radio Minsk

Coverage
- Availability: Belarus

Links
- Website: www.radio1.by

The First National Channel of Belarusian Radio (Russian: Первый Национальный канал Белорусского радио; Belarusian: Першы Нацыянальны канал Беларускага радыё) is a Belarusian national radio station owned by Belteleradio. Broadcasting is done on the FM band.

== History ==
The station started broadcasting on 15 November 1925 as RB-10, named after the Council of People's Commissars of the BSSR. It broadcast for 30 minutes a day within a radius of up to 300 km. From 1928, the station started cable radio broadcasting (which was switched off in 2016), as well as regional broadcasting. In those times, 70-80% of the content was broadcast in Belarusian.

Following the German invasion of the Soviet Union, the RV-10 radio station temporarily suspended its operations, and then resumed broadcasting in 1944, first from liberated Gomel, and subsequently from Minsk.

During the 1950s, the infrastructure improved.

Later, in the 1970s, it converted its operations to a three-channel cable radio network and introduced stereo broadcasting on FM (in the OIRT frequency plan).

On 1 September 2005, the station started both 24-hour broadcasting (on FM) and internet streaming. That same day, it pushed back the starting time of its morning programs by one hour to 5am.

The cable radio frequency network was switched off on 1 October 2016. The station broadcast in this technology from 6am to midnight, unlike on FM, where it operated 24/7.

== Usage as a propaganda tool ==
On 29 January 2015, president Alexander Lukashenko delivered a seven-hour seven-minute speech on the events that unfolded in the previous year in Ukraine, as well as political prisoners, which he claimed that they "did not exist".

On 19 August 2020, the station's director-general was expected to meet BTRC president Ivan Eismont, but he did not show up.
