= Dzmitry Zhuk =

Belarusian journalist

- Дзмітрый Жук (Belarusian, official orthography); Дзьмітры Жук (Belarusian, Taraškievica); Дмитрий Александрович Жук (Russian)

Main Editor of the Sovetskaya Belorussiya
- Incumbent
- Assumed office 2018
- Preceded by: Pavel Yakubovich

Director General of the Belarusian Telegraph Agency
- In office 2 May 2003 – 6 February 2018

Dzmitry Zhuk (Belarusian: Дзмітрый Жук or Дзьмітры Жук) is a Belarusian journalist and media manager. He is the former head of the press service of president Alexander Lukashenko. Since February 2018 Main Editor of the state-owned newspaper holding Sovetskaya Belorussiya. He was accused of organizing propagandist support to political repressions and placed on the EU sanctions list between 2012 and 2016 when he was Director General of the state-owned news agency BelTA. Son of the Belarusian writer Ales Zhuk

== Biography ==
D. Zhuk was born in 1970 in Letkaushchyna, Minsk Region.

In 1992 he graduated from the Philology Faculty of the Belarusian State University. In 1992-1993 he worked as a teacher of Belarusian language and literature at a school in Minsk.

Between 1993 and 1997 he worked in the publication and information department of the National Bank of Belarus. In 1997 - 1999 Zhuk worked at the representative office of the Russian news service Interfax in Belarus.

In 1999 D. Zhuk was appointed head of press service of the President of Belarus, Alexander Lukashenko.

From 2 May 2003 to 6 February 2018 he was the director of BelTA, the Belarusian state news agency.

From 2018 he is the CEO of Sovetskaya Belorussiya.

Dzmitry Zhuk is a member of the Council of the Republic of Belarus of the 8th convocation.

== Accusations, EU sanctions ==
In 2011, after the wave of repressions that followed the 2010 presidential election, Dzmitry Zhuk and several other top managers and employees of major state media became subject to an EU travel ban and asset freeze as part of a sanctions list of 208 individuals responsible for political repressions, electoral fraud and propaganda in Belarus. The sanctions were lifted in 2016.

According to the EU Council's decision, Dzmitry Zhuk was "responsible for relaying state propaganda in the media, which has supported and justified the repression of the democratic opposition and of civil society on 19 December 2010 using falsified information."

In November 2020, Zhuk was banned from entering Estonia, Latvia and Lithuania. In summer 2024, he was again added to the sanctions list of the European Union and Switzerland.
