= Oleg Romanov =

Oleg Romanov may refer to:

- Oleg Romanov (ice hockey) (born 1970), Belarusian ice hockey player
- Oleg Romanov (politician) (born 1975), Belarusian politician
- Prince Oleg Konstantinovich of Russia (1892–1914), Russian prince
