= Natallia Eismant =

Press secretary to Belarusian president

- Наталля Эйсмант; Наталья Эйсмонт
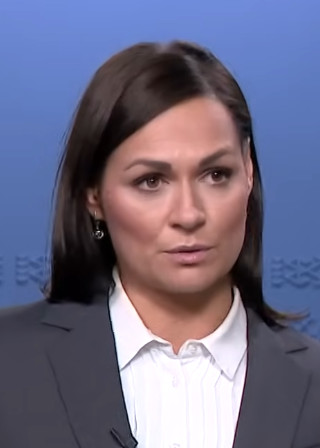
- Eismant in 2024
- Born: Natalya Selyun; 16 February 1984 (age 42); Minsk, Belarusian SSR, USSR
- Other name: Natalya Kirsanova
- Education: Belarusian State Academy of Arts

Natallia Nikolaevna Eismant (Belarusian: Наталля Мікалаеўна Эйсмант, romanized: Natalla Mikałaewna Eismant; Russian: Наталья Николаевна Эйсмонт; née Selyun Belarusian: Сялюн, romanized: Sialun; Russian: Селюн, born 16 February 1984) is a press secretary of Belarusian president Alexander Lukashenko.

== Early life ==
Her maiden name was Selyun. She graduated from Minsk State Musical College and Belarusian State Academy of Arts (drama and cinema actress). She worked in Belarusian Musical Theatre for some time. In 2006, she started working as a host on state-owned National TV as Natalya Kirsanava, which is believed to be a pseudonym. She hosted several news programs. While working on national TV, she met and married crime news host Ivan Eismant.

== Press secretary of Alexander Lukashenko ==
In 2014, Natallia Eismant was appointed press secretary of the President Alexander Lukashenko. Circumstances of her promotion are unknown. One source claimed that she was introduced to Lukashenko by the beauty queen Daria Shmanai, who accompanied the president. Fashion designer Sasha Varlamov claimed that the sister-in-law Anna Eismant introduced Natallia to Lukashenko. In 2018, her husband Ivan Eismant was appointed the head of the National State Television and Radio Company.

In office she made several controversial statements. In 2019, she advocated dictatorship, claiming it to be "Belarusian brand". She said that dictatorship is "order, discipline and absolutely normal calm life". In 2020, she claimed that the lack of measures to prevent the spread of COVID-19 pandemic was a thoughtful measure of Lukashenko. On 23 September 2020, Eismant misinformed journalists about the inauguration of Lukashenko: she told that the journalists will be "surely informed" about the inauguration, but they learned about the event from the state TV news after the inauguration was held. In November 2021, she voiced a completely different version about content of a phone conversation between Alexander Lukashenko and Angela Merkel which was later disproved by the German authorities.

She is considered to be one of the most influential women among the Belarusian authorities. Eismant is reported to have a big impact on Lukashenko. She is reported to maintain the Telegram channel of the president's press service or write to it personally. She denied direct control over the channel, but acknowledged that certain content is posted there at her direction.

== International sanctions ==
On 6 November 2020, the Council of the European Union included Natallia Eismant in the list of persons and entities subject to restrictive measures set out in Annex I to Regulation (EC) No 765/2006. Her public statements defending Lukashenko and criticizing opposition activists and peaceful protesters were considered as "seriously undermining democracy and the rule of law in Belarus". She was banned from visiting European Union and her assets in EU were frozen. Eismant was also sanctioned by the United Kingdom, and Canada. On 24 November, Iceland, Liechtenstein, Norway, North Macedonia, Montenegro and Albania aligned themselves with the November EU sanctions against 15 Belarusian individuals, while Switzerland did the same on 11 December.

On 21 June 2021, the U.S. Treasury added Eismant to its Specially Designated Nationals and Blocked Persons List.

Excerpt from the statement by the U.S. Treasury:

As Lukashenka’s press secretary, Natallia Mikalaeuna Eismant (Eismant) manages Lukashenka’s public image in the press and on social media and is known as one of his closest associates. Eismant created and pushed a narrative that labeled Belarusians protesting the fraudulent August 9, 2020, presidential election as proponents of chaos and disorder, while labeling Lukashenka as the solution to end the political chaos, portraying him as a champion of discipline and stability, and enabling the violence perpetrated against demonstrators.

In 2022, Eismant was sanctioned by Japan, Ukraine and New Zealand in relation to the 2022 Russian invasion of Ukraine.
