= Avangard (1939) =

- Founded: October 5, 1939
- Ceased publication: June 18, 1941
- Political alignment: Communist
- Language: Russian language (1939–1941), Polish language (1939–1940)
- Headquarters: Maja 1 street
- City: Avgustov
- Country: Soviet Union
- Circulation: 1,000–2,000

Avangard (Russian: Авангард) was a newspaper published from Avgustov, Belorussian SSR 1939–1941. The first issue was published on October 5, 1939.

During its first 29 issues (until December 28, 1939) Avangard was published as a Russian-Polish bilingual organ of the Provisional Administration of the City of Avgustov and the Avgustov Uyezd. Occasionally there would be a Yiddish language article published in the newspaper. The format was 41 x 58 centimetres, with copies generally containing two pages in a five-column layout. The circulation of the newspaper stood between 1,000 and 2,000. Copies were sold for 5 kopeks.

From January 1, 1940 the newspaper was only available via subscription. During its first nine issues of 1940 (January 1 to January 21), it functioned as the organ of the Avgustov Uyezd Committee of the Communist Party (Bolsheviks) of Belorussia and the Avgustov Uyezd Executive Committee. Then it became the organ of the Avgustov District Committee of the Communist Party (Bolsheviks) of Belorussia and the Avgustov District Soviet. From February 5, 1940 it became a monolingual Russian-language newspaper.

The editorial office of the newspaper was located on Maja 1 street. It was edited at different points by G. Minczukow, N. Szulejko, T. Griebieniewicz and Andriej Kaweckij (the latter as acting chief editor). Other members of the editorial board included S. Kutanov, T. Zan and M. Sejnienski. Other frequent contributors to the newspaper included Lejb Wilkowski, Jan Stankiewicz and M. Kubas. From August 15, 1940 onward M. Petrovsky served as deputy chief editor, assigned to the role by the Central Committee of the Communist Party (Bolsheviks) of Belorussia.

Avangard relied on a network of rural correspondents from different parts of the Avgustov District, generally employees of the Soviet administration or educational institutions. The newspaper contained reprints from TASS, BelTA and central Soviet newspapers, as well as decrees from local authorities. The publishing frequency of Avangard was irregular. By April 1941 nine-month subscriptions were sold for 7.65 rubles. 117 issues were published in 1940 and 49 issues in 1941. The last issue of Avangard was published on June 18, 1941.
