= Azarenko =

Azarenko (Ukrainian: Азаренко) is a Ukrainian patronymic surname. Belarusian forms: Azarenka, Azaranka (Азаренка Азаранка). Notable people with the surname include:

- Mikhail Azarenko, Russian sport shooter
- Victoria Azarenka (born 1989), Belarusian tennis player

== See also ==
- Azarenkov
