= The First News Channel =

The First News Channel Первый информационный
- Country: Belarus
- Broadcast area: Belarus
- Headquarters: Minsk, Belarus

Programming
- Languages: Russian, Belarusian
- Picture format: 1080i (16:9 HDTV)

Ownership
- Owner: Belteleradio
- Sister channels: Belarus 1; Belarus-2; Belarus 3; Belarus 4; Belarus 5; Belarus 24; NTV-Belarus

History
- Launched: 17 September 2024; 23 months ago

Links
- Website: www.news.by

Availability

Terrestrial
- DVB-T: MUX 1
- Belintersat-1: 11350 H

Streaming media
- news.by: Watch live

The First News Channel (Russian: Первый информационный) is a Belarusian news channel owned by Belteleradio. The channel is the first all-news channel from inside Belarus.

== History and criticism ==
Belteleradio launched the channel on 17 September 2024, People's Unity Day. BTRC claimed that information would be updated around the clock, while not affecting the quality of the product. Cable companies such as Kosmos Telecom added the channel days in advance. The channel was repeatedly applauded in the pre-launch period by officialist politicians.

Opposition media, however, criticized the channel. Nasha Niva noted that the channel's name was tied in with Lukashenko's obsession with using the word "First" and considered the channel to be "predictably boring", with a line-up mostly consisting of programs already made for other BTRC channels. Pozirk criticized its creation as a tool to boost Lukashenko's cult of personality and that the channel was part of a string of web projects the government created to clone Russian and Western analogs using the state budget. Reformation speculated that Russian propagandists could easily shape up the channel's editorial guidelines.

== Programming ==
The First News Channel, in addition to carrying its own news bulletins, also carries the main news from Belarus 1, Panorama and Sport-kadr, as well as other current affairs programs already seen on other channels such as investigative program Zone X, Sphere of Interests, The Main Broadcast and Secrets of the Investigation. It also aired in its launch week 100 Questions for an Adult, where children were asked pre-researched questions to adult figures. The national anthem is broadcast two times a day.
