= Dmitry Matusevich =

Belarusian politician (born 1978)

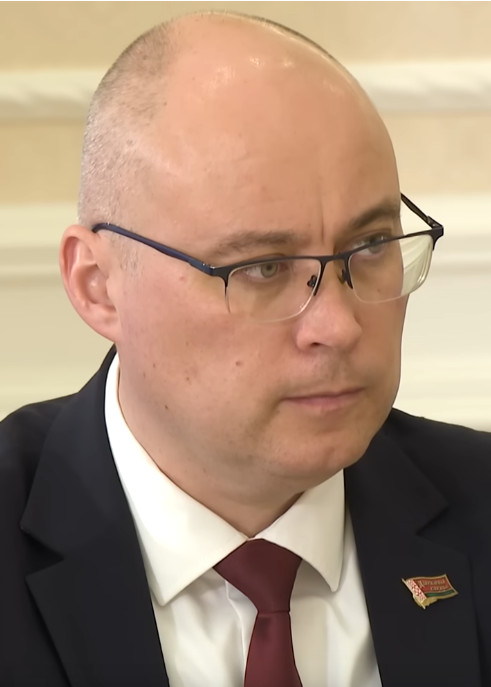
- Dmitry Matusevich in 2025

Deputy head of the Presidential Administration of Belarus
- Incumbent
- Assumed office 27 March 2025
- President: Alexander Lukashenko

Chairman of the State Property Committee
- In office 4 June 2020 – 27 March 2025
- President: Alexander Lukashenko
- Prime Minister: Roman Golovchenko; Alexander Turchin
- Preceded by: Andrei Gayev
- Succeeded by: Vitaly Nevera

Personal details
- Born: 18 October 1978 (age 47) Molodechno, Minsk Oblast, Byelorussian SSR, Soviet Union
- Education: Belarusian State Technological University Belarusian State Economic University

Dmitry Feofanovich Matusevich (Russian: Дмитрий Феофанович Матусевич; born 18 October 1978) is a Belarusian politician serving as deputy head of the Presidential Administration since 2025. From 2020 to 2025, he served as chairman of the State Property Committee. From 2017 to 2020, he served as deputy minister of economy.

== Early life and education ==
Dmitry Matusevich was born in Molodechno on October 18, 1978.

He graduated from the Belarusian State Technological University in 2001, where he was a PhD student until 2007. He also earned degrees from the Belarusian State Economic University in 2004 and the Presidential Academy of Public Administration in 2010.

== Career ==
Dmitry Matusevich joined the civil service in 2007, he worked in the Ministry of Forestry, the Ministry of Economy, and the Council of Ministers of the Republic of Belarus.

In 2015, he was appointed Director of the Main Department of the Ministry of Economy. He rose through the ranks, becoming Deputy Minister in 2017, Chairman of the State Property Committee in 2020, and Deputy Head of the Presidential Administration in 2025.

== Personal life ==
He is married and has two daughters.
