= Olga Chupris =

Belarusian law professor and administrator (born 1969)

Olga Chupris Volha Iwanawna Chuprys
- Вольга Чупрыс
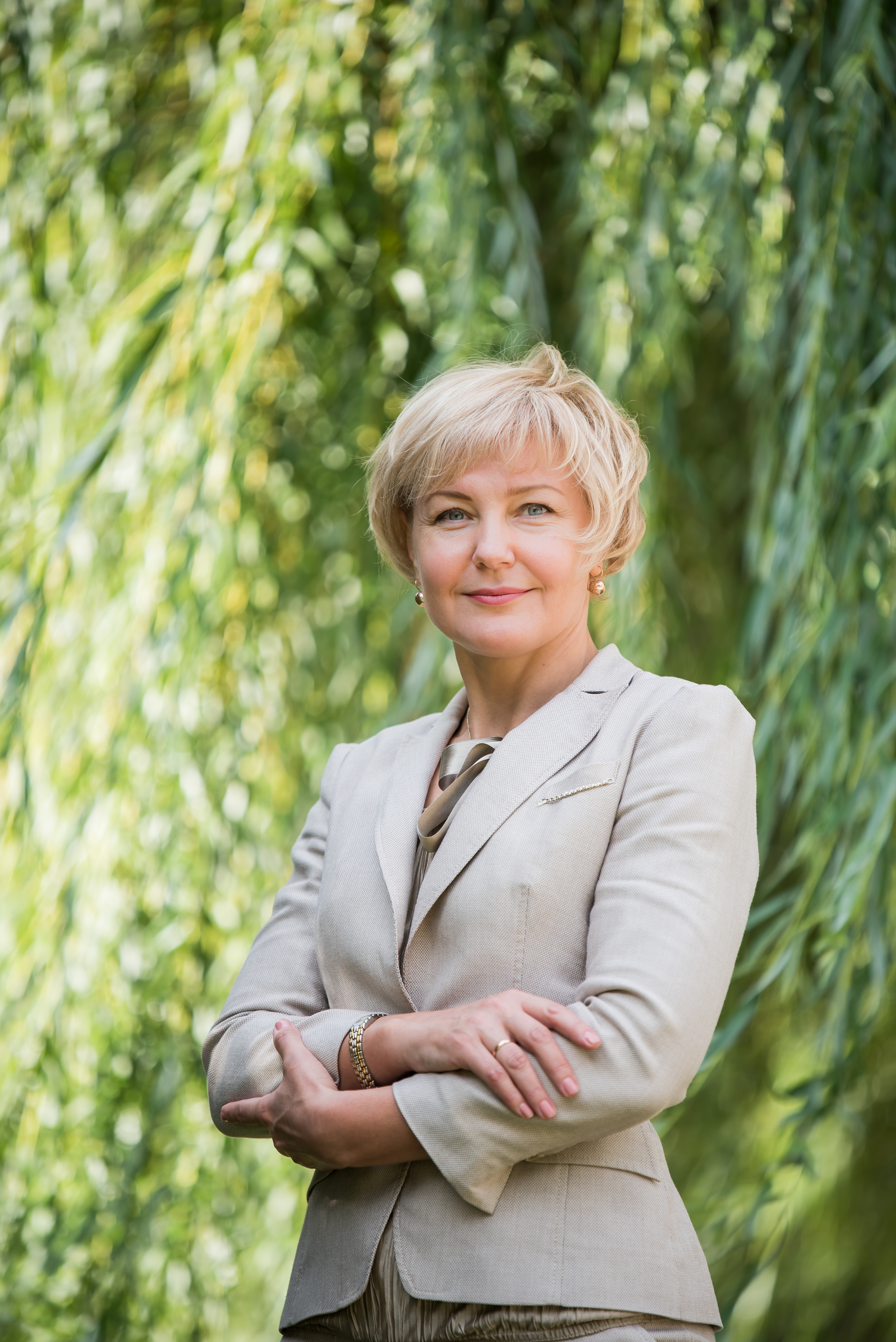
- Born: December 9, 1969 (age 56); Minsk, Belarus, USSR
- Education: Belarusian State University
- Scientific career
- Fields: Law
- Workplaces: Belarusian State University

Olga Chupris (or Volha Chuprys, Belarusian: Вольга Іванаўна Чупрыс) is a Belarusian lawyer, deputy head of the Presidential Administration of Belarus (since 2019).

She is also a Doctor of Law, and a professor. Chupris is the first female vice rector of the Belarusian State University, which is the oldest and largest university in Belarus.

== Biography ==
Olga Chupris was born on December 9, 1969, in Minsk. In 1992, she graduated from the Law Faculty of the Belarusian State University, and in 1997, graduated from the BSU postgraduate program. In 1998, she defended her thesis for the degree of candidate of legal sciences on the topic "Constitutional and legal problems of citizenship in the countries of the Commonwealth of Independent States: a comparative legal analysis." In 2003, Olga Chris was awarded the academic title of "associate professor." After finishing her postgraduate studies, she started working at the BSU as a teacher. It wasn't long until she was promoted into the senior teacher than an assistant professor in 2000, deputy director of the Law College of the BSU (2004-2005), and eventually Deputy Dean for educational work at the BSU (2005-2006). From 2010 to 2016, she worked as Deputy Dean of the Faculty of Law on educational innovations, as well as educational and methodical work. From 2009 to 2016, she served as the Head of Teaching and Methodical Commission for the Law of Faculty at the Belarusian State University. From 2015 to 2018, she was the Head of the Department of Public Administration for the Law of Faculty at the BSU. She worked as a professor at the Department of Constitutional Law of the BSU. Since January 10, 2018, she has been the Vice-Rector for Academic Work and Educational Innovations of the Belarusian State University.

On 6 December 2019, Chupris was appointed deputy head of the Presidential Administration of Belarus.

On 31 August 2020, Chupris was included on lists of personae non gratae in Latvia, Estonia, and Lithuania for organising and supporting the falsification of the 2020 Belarusian presidential election as well as supporting the violent suppression of peaceful protests.

== Scientific activity ==
Chupris is a member of the Scientific Advisory Councils at the Ministry of Justice of the Republic of Belarus and the Supreme Court of the Republic of Belarus; and a member of the council on thesis defence at the National Center for Legislation and Legal Studies of the Republic of Belarus. She was also a member of the Scientific Advisory Board of the Supreme Economic Court of the Republic of Belarus. In 1998 she received a degree in legal sciences with the thesis: "Constitutional and legal problems of citizenship in the countries of the Commonwealth of Independent States: a comparative legal analysis."

From 2006 to 2008, she was the executor of the research program “To conduct a comprehensive analysis of the modern legislation of the Republic of Belarus regulating priority and socially important areas of public relations; prepare a new legal classifier ensuring the optimal construction of legislation by industry, integrity and consistency of legal norms, and create on the basis of this classifier “package” collections of legal acts in electronic form”.

In 2010, she acquired a degree of Doctor of Law with the thesis: "Theoretical problems of legal regulation of the public service of the Republic of Belarus".

As part of the working group, she participated in the development of the Concept of the draft Code of the Republic of Belarus on State Administration and Local Self-Government. As part of VNK participated in the development of the draft Concept of the Education Code. As part of the working group, she participated in the development of draft laws on introducing amendments and addenda to the Code of Administrative Offences and the Procedural-Executive Code of Administrative Offences of the Republic of Belarus. Participated in the international technical assistance project “Assistance to regional development in the framework of European regions”, 2013–2014.

As a member of the working group, she participated in the preparation of a legislative act on civil service issues, 2018.

Chupris is the author of over 150 scientific publications, including more than 70 articles, published in national and international journals.

== Published works ==
- List of published works.

=== Monographs ===
- Чуприс, О.И. Теоретико-правовые проблемы государственной службы Республики Беларусь / О.И.Чуприс; Национальный центр законодательства и правовых исследований Республики Беларусь. – Минск : Право и экономика, 2009. – 310 с.
- Чуприс, О.И. Регистрация субъектов предпринимательской деятельности: Россия и СНГ: Отв. ред. Засл. юрист РФ, д.ю.н. Р.А.Адельханян. – М.: Статут ФБУ ГРП при Минюсте России, 2012. – Пар. 2 гл. 3 (Салей,Е.А., Чуприс, О.И. Особенности государственной регистрации субъектов хозяйствования в Республике Беларусь).
- Чуприс, О.И., Гасан, Л.И. Теория меры административного взыскания и ее нормативно-правовая реализация. – Минск : БГУ, 2014 – 99 с.
- Чуприс О.И. Административно-правовые споры в социальной сфере: теоретико-прикладные вопросы / О.И.Чуприс [и др. ]; под общ. ред. О.И.Чуприс. – Минск: БГУ, 2016. – 267 с. (в соавт.).
- Административно-правовое принуждение в государственном управлении Республики Беларусь / О.И.Чуприс [и др.]. – Минск : Четыре четверти, 2018. – 384 с. (в соавт.).

=== Educational and scientific-methodical publications ===
- Административное право. Часть 2 Административно-деликтное право. Особенная часть : учеб. пособие / А.Н. Крамник, Н.А. Крамник, Т.В. Телятицкая, К.В.Хомич, О.И.Чуприс; под ред. А.Н.Крамника. – Минск: Изд. Центр БГУ, 2010. – 394 с.
- Юридический справочник для населения : С.М.Ананич, Е.И.Астапов, О.И.Чуприс [и др.]; Национ. центр законодательства и правовых исследований Респ. Беларусь. – Минск : ГИУСТ БГУ, 2011. – 759 с.
- Чуприс, О.И. Административное право Республики Беларусь: конспект лекций: в 2-х ч. Ч.1 Управленческое право. – Минск: Изд. Центр БГУ, 2013.
- Чуприс О.И. Административное право Республики Беларусь: конспект лекций: в 2-х ч. Ч.2 Административно-деликтное право. Процессуально-исполнительное право. –Минск: Изд. Центр БГУ, 2013.
- А.Н.Крамник, О.И.Чуприс Административное право. В 2 ч. Ч. 1 Управленческое право : учебник. – Минск: Изд-во БГУ, 2013.– 567 с.
- Административное право: учебник для студ. вузов по спец. «Правоведение» / Л.М.Рябцев [и др.]; под общ. ред. Л.М.Рябцева.– Минск : Амалфея, 2013. –416 с.
- Административное право: Учебник для учреждений среднего спец. образования по специальности «Правоведение» / Л.М. Рябцев [и др.]; под общ ред. Л.М. Рябцева. – Минск: Адукацыя і выхаванне. 2014. – 320 с.
- Чуприс, О.И., Червякова Т.А. Практикум по административному праву / О.И.Чуприс, Т.А.Червякова. – Минск: Изд. центр БГУ, 2016. – 150 с.
- Административно-деликтное и процессуально-исполнительное право : учеб. пособие. В 2 ч. / Л.М. Рябцев [и др.]; под ред. Л.М. Рябцева, О.И. Чуприс. – Минск : Вышэйшая школа, 2017. Ч. 1 Административно-деликтное право / Л.М. Рябцев [и др.]. – 327 с.
- Административно-деликтное и процессуально-исполнительное право : учеб. пособие. В 2 ч. / Л.М. Рябцев [и др.]; под ред. Л.М. Рябцева, О.И. Чуприс. – Минск : Вышэйшая школа, 2017. Ч. 2 Процессуально-исполнительное право / Л.М. Рябцев [и др.]. – 239 с.

=== Publications in foreign sources ===
- Чуприс, О.И. Административные меры стимулирования использования возобновляемых источников энергии в Республике Беларусь // Erneuerbare Energien und rechtsstaatliche Politik Belarussische und deutsche Positionen : Schriftenreihe der Deutsch-Belarussischen Juristenvereinigung; G. Gornig, H.-D. Horn, E. Weiler. – Marburg: Klages Verlag, 2013. – B. 2. – Р. 29–41.
- Volha I. Chuprys, Alena A. Dastanka Euroregions as a Part of Trans-Border Cooperation of Belarus: Legal and Sociological Aspects // Regional Formation and Development Studies. – 2014. – Vol 13. – No.2. – р. 16–24.

== Sources ==
- Olga Chupris in the opening of the forum and high-level panel discussion of the second International Forum of Women Leaders;
- Olga Chupris - laureate of the highest legal award "Themis";
- Olga Chupris in the awards ceremony for the winners of the competition for the prize named after V. D. Spasovich;
- Speech by Olga Chupris at the International Scientific and Practical Conference "Traditions and Innovations in Law".
