= Viktor Azarenok =

Belarusian politician (born 1974)

Member of the House of Representatives
- Incumbent
- Assumed office 22 March 2024
- Constituency: Lepelsky

Personal details
- Born: 23 August 1974 (age 51)
- Party: Belaya Rus
- Relatives: Yuri Azarenok (brother); Grigory Azarenok (nephew)

Viktor Vladimirovich Azarenok (Russian: Виктор Владимирович Азарёнок; born 23 August 1974) is a Belarusian politician serving as a member of the House of Representatives since 2024. He is the brother of Yuri Azarenok and the uncle of Grigory Azarenok.
