= Belarus-4 =

Belarusian state-owned television channel

Belarus 4 Беларусь 4
- Country: Belarus
- Broadcast area: Belarus
- Headquarters: Minsk, Belarus

Programming
- Languages: Russian, Belarusian
- Picture format: 1080i (16:9 HDTV)

Ownership
- Owner: National State Television and Radio Company of the Republic of Belarus
- Sister channels: Belarus 1 Belarus 2 Belarus 3 Belarus 5 Belarus 24; NTV Belarus; The First News Channel

History
- Launched: 4 September 2015; 10 years ago

Links
- Website: tvr.by

Belarus 4 (Belarusian: Беларусь 4) is a state-owned television channel in Belarus.

It is essentially the union of five television channels, which previously broadcast their regional programs on Belarus 2, under a common name. Each of the six regions of Belarus, with the exception of Minsk, has its own channel. It launched in a staggered manner between 4 September and 15 November 2015.

== History ==
Prior to the launch of the Belarus-4 network, regional programming was seen on a limited basis on Belarus-1 and, mostly, Belarus-2, in morning and evening blocks. Facing the limitations of the old system, Belteleradio announced the creation of region-specific Belarus-4 channels in 2015. The network consists of six channels (initially five) which share the same infrastructure, but have their own programming. The Ministry of Information made the plans public on 15 April of that year.

The first of these channels, Belarus-4 Mogylev, launched on 8 September 2015. The channel was launched at 6:30am that day by regional chairman Vladimir Domanevsky in the control room. It launched with twenty local programs and a news service at 1pm. Mogylev was selected as the first target due to demand from local citizens; Belteleradio would gradually launch other channels in the network over time. Initially, the launch was scheduled for 1 September, but was delayed by one week by BTRC staff on purpose to match International Day for Journalists' Solidarity, and the choice of date (on the eighth of the month) represented infinity and harmony between generations. The second of these stations, Belarus-4 Gomel, launched on 25 September.

Belarus-4 Vitebsk became the third station in the network on 1 October. Belarus-4 Grodno followed on 8 October, operating in test mode until the new year. The last of these, Belarus-5, launched on 15 November.

Regarding the lack of a Minsk-specific channel, the corporation announced that it did not have an independent technical base in Minsk (city and region) and would create a local edition of the channel later.

During 2016, the network of channels had a varied amount of broadcasting hours. Only Mogylev had its journalists working in the morning, while Grodno was increasing its local airtime.

On 19 September 2024, the YouTube channels of Belarus-4's regional centers were blocked by the Lithuanian authorities. This came after LRT solicited YouTube's parent company Google to suspend all of BTRC's channels in the country in July.
