= Belarus-5 =

Belarusian state-owned television channel

Belarus 5 Беларусь 5
- Country: Belarus
- Broadcast area: Belarus
- Headquarters: Minsk, Belarus

Programming
- Language: Russian
- Picture format: 1080i (16:9 HDTV)

Ownership
- Owner: National State Television and Radio Company of the Republic of Belarus
- Sister channels: Belarus 1 Belarus 2 Belarus 3 Belarus 4 Belarus 24; NTV Belarus; The First News Channel

History
- Launched: 21 October 2013; 12 years ago

Links
- Website: 5sport.by

Belarus 5 (Belarusian: Беларусь 5) is Belteleradio's sports channel. Broadcasts started on 21 October 2013 and it mostly carries live sporting events. The channel's editorial team is also in control of the 5Sport website.

In addition to the main channel on linear television platforms, it also provides a secondary feed (Belarus 5 Internet).

== History ==
President Alexander Lukashenko demanded Belteleradio to launch a sports channel on the quick fast, while not reducing the proportion of sports broadcasts on the existing channels, under the rationale of promoting a healthy lifestyle.

Test broadcasts began on 1 October 2013.

Regular broadcasts began on 21 October 2013, initially only on cable networks. After an executive decision on 13 May 2015, the channel became a part of the must-carry packages for cable television effective 1 July that year.

As of 2023, it employed 50 staff, around 40 of which being commentators and journalists, and a further ten from ATN's sports news division.

== Belarus-5 Internet ==
Belarus-5 Internet is an internet offshoot of the main Belarus-5. It mainly simulcasts the same events seen on the TV channel, but without commentary. Launched on 1 October 2018, in its first week, its stream received 120,000 visitors.

== Sport5 ==
Sport5 is Belarus-5's official website. It launched in April 2023 and features sports news and live streams of both Belarus-5 and Belarus-5 internet. It also acts as an overflow service for the main channel, airing extra matches. This happened in July 2022 when two Belarusian teams took part in the UEFA Champions League qualifyers.
