= Alexander Radkov =

Belarusian politician

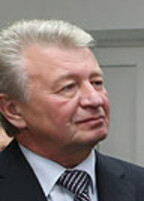
- Alexander Radkov in 2013

Minister of Education
- In office 6 August 2003 – 28 December 2010
- Preceded by: Petr Brigadin
- Succeeded by: Sergey Maskevich

Leader of Belaya Rus
- In office 17 November 2007 – 19 January 2018
- Preceded by: Office established
- Succeeded by: Gennady Davydko

Personal details
- Born: 1 July 1951 (age 75) Bychaw Raion, Byelorussian SSR, Soviet Union
- Party: Belaya Rus

Alexander Mikhailovich Radkov (Belarusian: Аляксандр Міхайлавіч Радзькоў, Aleksandr Mikhailavich Radzkou; born 1 July 1951) is a Belarusian politician. A former Minister of Education and Deputy Head of the Presidential Administration, he is currently leader of the Belaya Rus party.

== Biography ==
Radkov attended Mogilev State Pegagoical Institute, graduating with a degree in physics and mathematics. He became vice-rector of the university, now renamed the Mogilev State A. Kuleshov University, in 1997, and rector in 2001. Since 2010 he heads Belaya Rus, a political movement that supports President Alexander Lukashenko.

== Sanctions from the EU and other countries ==
In May 2006, following the presidential elections, Alexander Radkov became subject to the travel ban and asset freeze by the European Union and the United States of America as part of the list of people and organizations sanctioned in relation to human rights violations in Belarus. The same sanctions were applied to him after the 2010 presidential elections.

In accordance with the decision of the European Council on October 15, 2012, as the first deputy head of the presidential administration, the former minister of education, he closed European Humanities University, ordered the repression of opposition students and organized students to force them to vote for the regime. Alexander Radkov, who is close to President Lukashenko as the leader of Belaya Rus, the main ideological and political organization of the regime, also played an active role in organizing the rigged elections in 2008, 2010 and 2012, as well as in the subsequent repressions against peaceful demonstrators in 2008 and 2010.
