= Polessky State University =

Public university in Pinsk, Belarus

Coordinates: 52.1137°N 26.1130°E

- Палескі дзяржаўны універсітэт
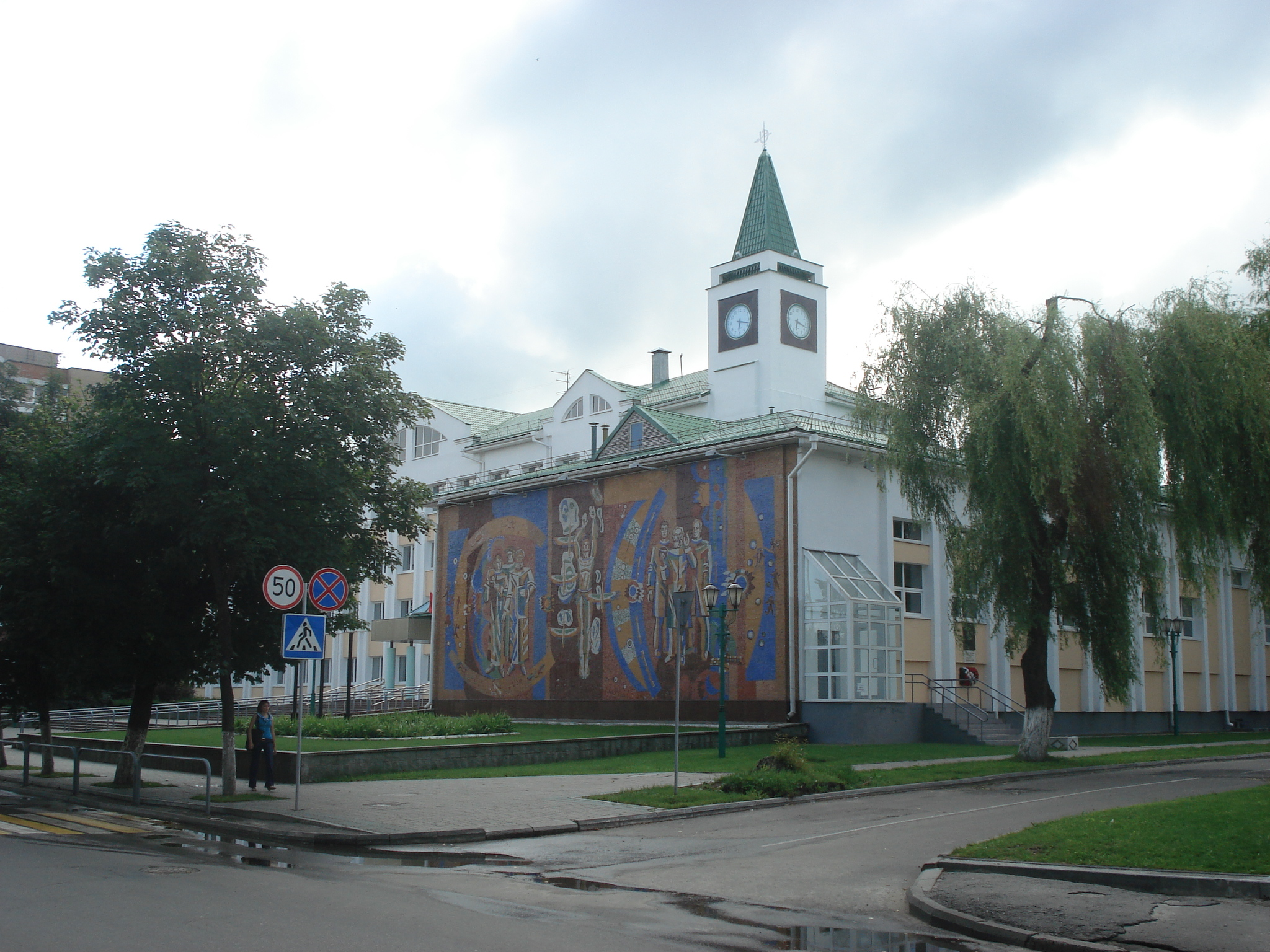
- Established: 2006; 20 years ago
- Location: Pinsk, Belarus
- Website: eng.polessu.by

Polessky State University (Belarusian: Палескі дзяржаўны універсітэт, ПалесДУ; Russian: Полесский государственный университет, ПолесГУ) is a public university located in Pinsk, Brest Voblast, Belarus. The university was established in 2006. The university offers both undergraduate and post-graduate degree courses.

== Faculty ==
The university has the following departments and faculties—

- Department of Banking
- Department of Economics
- Department of Biotechnology
- Banking faculty
