= Oleg Romanov (politician) =

Belarusian politician

- Алег Раманаў; Олег Романов
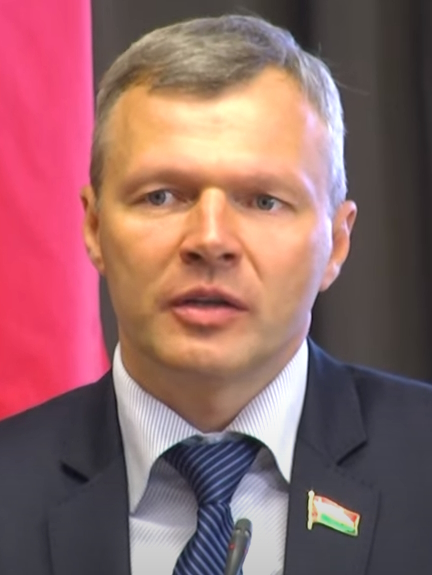
- Romanov in 2023

Chairman of the Belaya Rus party
- Incumbent
- Assumed office 18 March 2023
- Preceded by: Party established

Chairman of the Belaya Rus public association
- Incumbent
- Assumed office 18 June 2022
- Preceded by: Gennady Davydko

Member of the Council of the Republic
- In office 6 December 2019 – March 2024

Personal details
- Born: Alieh Aliaksandravič Ramanaŭ; 9 August 1975 (age 51) Grodno, Grodno Region Byelorussian SSR, Soviet Union (now Belarus)
- Party: Belaya Rus (since 2023)
- Education: Yanka Kupala State University of Grodno
- Profession: politician, philosopher

Oleg Aleksandrovich Romanov or Alieh Aliaksandravič Ramanaŭ (Belarusian: Алег Аляксандравіч Раманаў, Russian: Олег Александрович Романов, born 9 August 1975) is a Belarusian politician, professor and doctor of philosophical sciences, who is the chairman of the Belaya Rus party.

He was a member of the Council of the Republic of the National Assembly of the Republic of Belarus of the VII convocation and is currently a member of the House of Representatives of Belarus of the VIII convocation.

== Biography ==
He was born on 9 August 1975 in Grodno, Belarusian SSR, USSR. He graduated from the Faculty of Biology of Yanka Kupala State University of Grodno, then postgraduate studies at the same university, and in 2001 he defended his thesis for the candidate of philosophical sciences degree on the topic "Socialization of the individual in the conditions of social transformation". Later, he completed doctoral studies at the Institute of Philosophy of the National Academy of Sciences of Belarus and in 2015 defended his thesis for the Doctor of Philosophy degree on the topic "East Slavic civilization as a subject of modern global social transformations" in the specialty "Social Philosophy". Has the academic title of professor.

He worked as a psychologist at a secondary school in Grodno, then as a teacher, senior lecturer, associate professor and professor at the Department of Philosophy at Yanka Kupala State University of Grodno. From February 2018 to 11 March 2021, he held the position of the first vice-rector of Yanka Kupala State University of Grodno. From March 11, 2021, to June 2022, he worked as the rector of Saint Euphrosyne Polotsk State University.

In April 2023, Ukrainian president Volodymyr Zelenskyy introduced sanctions against Romanov.

== Participation in political repressions ==
With the arrival of Oleg Romanov to the post of rector of Saint Euphrosyne Polotsk State University, active persecution of students and teachers who disagreed with the results of the 2020 presidential election began, as well as the dismissal of candidates and doctors of science from the university for publicly criticizing the actions of the Belarusian authorities in the post-election period.
