= Ivan Eismont =

Belarusian politician (born 1977)

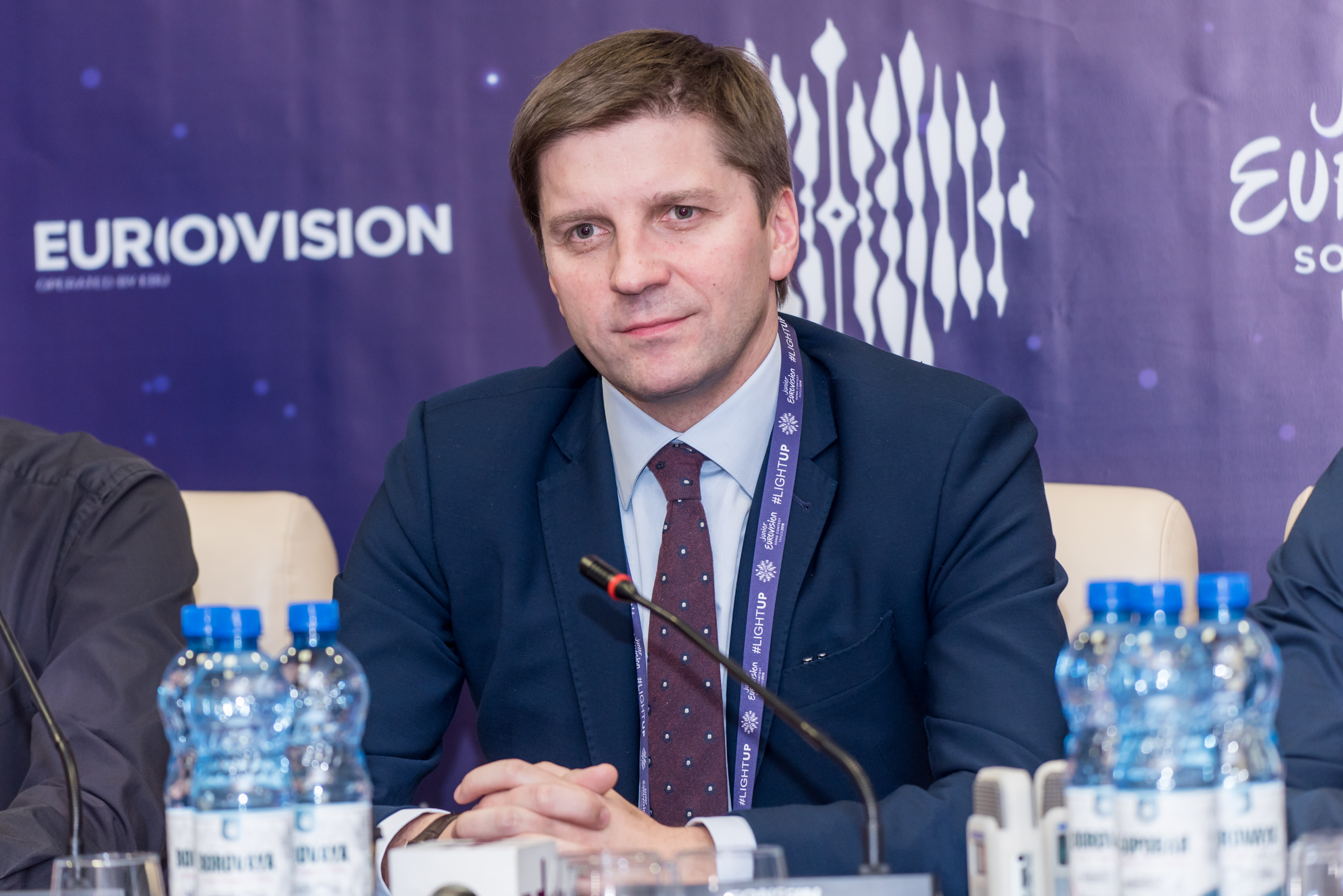
- Eismont in 2018

Member of the Minsk City Council of Deputies
- Incumbent
- Assumed office February 2024

Chairman of Belteleradio
- Incumbent
- Assumed office 6 February 2018
- Appointed by: Alexander Lukashenko
- Preceded by: Gennady Davydko

Personal details
- Born: 20 January 1977 (age 49)
- Party: Independent
- Spouse: Natalia Eismont (m. 2010)

Ivan Mikhailovich Eismont (Russian: Иван Михайлович Эйсмонт; born 20 January 1977) is a Belarusian journalist and politician serving as chairman of Belteleradio since 2018. He has served as deputy chairman of the Minsk City Council since 2024. In 2010, he married Natalia Eismont.
