= Propaganda in Belarus =

Propaganda in Belarus is the practice of state directed communication in order to promote patriotism and acceptance of Lukashenko's rule. Propaganda is distributed through state media, such as Belarus-1, which are owned by Belteleradiocompany, but also educational institutions are used for it.

== The situation with the media in Belarus, the goals of state propaganda ==
Despite the proclamation of freedom of speech in Article 33 of the 1996 Constitution of Belarus, Lukashenko's regime restricts it. The government supports state-owned media, such as Belarus 1, which have long been used for propaganda, and, due to their widespread presence in the information space, exercises direct control over the media landscape and information dissemination accordingly. This makes people in Belarus vulnerable to state propaganda, as they have little access to alternative and independent media. The main purpose of the propaganda is to preserve power, spread ideology, and popularize Alexander Lukashenko. In particular, the propaganda tries to create the feeling that the state, the government, and Lukashenko are one. The focus on Lukashenko is stronger than it was on the heads of state back in the USSR.

The nature of the propaganda system dates back to Soviet times. Lukashenko is portrayed as the indispensable father of the nation and the guarantor of stability. Sport plays an important role in covering events as a source of patriotism.

Significant indoctrination is carried on in schools, colleges, and universities: students receive one-sided messages about history and the current political situation. Out of Lukashenko's fear that professors would spread inflammatory ideas about pluralism, democracy and liberalism, a pro-Russian and pro-Soviet compulsory course "Fundamentals of the Ideology of the Belarusian State" was introduced in higher education institutions in 2003. In particular, Western states and their associations, such as the United States, NATO, but also Poland and the entire European Union, are seen as hostile. To be able to work in the state apparatus, candidates need to pass ideological tests.

== Examples of propaganda and targeted misrepresentation ==
Example of state propaganda - Lukashenko with a gun arrived by helicopter in the Palace of Independence during one of the Sunday opposition marches

During the COVID-19 pandemic in Belarus, Lukashenko downplayed the danger of the situation, and it was initially not allowed to report on the epidemic.

Against the background of protests since 2020, the state-owned media have been actively turning to hoaxes, using of stylistically reduced vocabulary and hanging labels, all of which was the result of intoxication by their own propaganda, according to journalist Pavliuk Bykousky. The East StratCom Task Force cited as an example the programs of Ryhor Azaronak from Capital TV where disinformation is accompanied by hate speech towards protesters and Sviatlana Tsikhanouskaya.

In the presentation of Belarusian propaganda, mass protests in 2020 are actions controlled by the West. Lukashenko himself stated in August 2020 that the West aimed at annexing the Grodno Region. According to him, Polish flags have already been flown in the region.

Propaganda in Belarus falsifies the Militsiya violence against demonstrators and, among other things, tries to weaken the protest movement through disinformation; in addition, other methods are purposefully used, such as arrests of opposition members, for example, the members of the Coordination Council.

Shortly after the detention, on 15 September 2020, of Stsiapan Latypau, Belarus-1 broadcast a story in which, citing the Ministry of Internal Affairs, it was alleged that a resident of "Square of Changes" was going to use poison against law enforcement officers, but in the final report of the Investigative Committee on the completion of the investigation, this version was missing.

At the end of September 2020, Belarus-1 broadcast a confession from a group of people who were allegedly paid by the coordinators for taking part in the protests. According to the testimony of one of the victims, on 29 September 2020, in the police department of the Pyershamayski District of Minsk, Mikalai Karpiankou filmed videos, which were later shown on Belarus-1, personally and commanded a group of security officials who beat out false testimonies from a group of people captured by the Main Directorate for Combating Organized Crime and Corruption of the MVD of the Republic of Belarus (GUBOPiK), who were beaten and threatened to say on camera that they were paid by the coordinators.

On 3 June 2021, All-National TV aired a program featuring Roman Protasevich and Marat Markau, the head of the TV channel, labeled as an interview with Protasevich. Protasevich was arrested by Belarusian authorities after his flight, Ryanair Flight 4978, was diverted to Minsk on the orders of Alexander Lukashenko on 23 May 2021, because of a false bomb threat conveyed by Belarusian air traffic control. The program provoked much criticism and was seen by many as an element of tortures of the political prisoner.

== Support of Belarusian propaganda by Russia ==
During the 2020–2021 Belarusian protests against the allegedly rigged presidential election, Belarusian state media journalists who refused to support official reports of Lukashenko's victory and operations against demonstrators were replaced by the Russian ones, including from RT.

State media reported that the opposition threatened that school lessons would soon be conducted only in Belarusian, although Belarusians, as most of them are bilingual, did not see the threat, said Ksenia Lutskina, a former Belteleradiocompany correspondent.

The state broadcaster Belarus-1 showed pictures of the speech of the opposition leader Maria Kalesnikava, which was accompanied by a chorus of voices shouting in Russian: Уходи! ("Go away!"). However, these calls by the protest movement were directed against Lukashenko.

Belarus-1 also reported on a family that was in a car during protests against Lukashenko in Grodno and was attacked by OMON, so the child was seriously injured. However, the report said that the family just accidentally got in a car accident.

Belarusian state propaganda was supported by the Russian propaganda channel RT. RT showed a video of an OMON officer claiming that the young man, who had been beaten by OMON to unconsciousness, was drunk and intoxicated; this was contradicted by the independent portal Tut.By, which published a doctor's report with the opposite information.

Lukashenko thanked RT for its help in covering the protests after the presidential election.

Since the first wave of protests in 2020, Belarusian state-run TV channels, with the help of media experts from Russia, have not only coordinated their disinformation narratives with pro-Kremlin media, but have also adopted the same tactics, such as picking on foreign diplomats.

== Consequences ==
Since 2006, the heads and leading propagandists of state-owned media (Belteleradiocompany, All-National TV, Capital TV, Sovetskaya Belorussiya – Belarus' Segodnya, Belarusian Telegraph Agency) have been repeatedly put in the EU-led list of people and organizations sanctioned in relation to human rights violations in Belarus, have been included in the Specially Designated Nationals and Blocked Persons List, the sanction lists of the United Kingdom, Switzerland.

Due to state propaganda, many journalists decided to leave their jobs in the state media of Belarus in the summer and autumn of 2020. For example, during this period, about a quarter of All-National TV employees resigned: at least 80 out of 300, even despite threats from the channel's management to them in the form of criminal cases and forced disappearances for that. In August, most of the staff left the Radio "Stolitsa".

The exodus continued in 2021: in January there were more than 100 vacancies at Belteleradiocompany, while, as of June, Belteleradiocompany had 160 vacancies, the Belarus Today publishing house (the Sovetskaya Belorussiya – Belarus' Segodnya newspaper, etc.) had 20 vacancies.

On 10 June 2021, Ukraine banned the retransmission of the Belarus 24 TV channel, claiming that it incited national hatred and spread of disinformation.

On 30 June 2021, Belteleradiocompany was expelled from the European Broadcasting Union.

== See also ==
- 2020–2021 Belarusian protests
- Censorship in Belarus

== Literature ==
- Usau, Pavał (2007). "Ideology of Belarusian State. Propaganda Mechanisms". In Pejda, Marta (ed.). Hopes, Illusions, Perspectives. Belarusian Society. Madison: East European Democratic Centre / University of Wisconsin–Madison. pp. 40–45.
- Andrew, Wilson (2021). Belarus. The last European Dictatorship (new ed.). New Haven, London: Yale University Press. p. 384. ISBN 978-0-300-25921-6.
- Pospieszna, Paulina (2014). Democracy Assistance from the Third Wave: Polish Engagement in Belarus and Ukraine. Pittsburgh: University of Pittsburgh Press.
