= Belarus-3 =

Belarusian state-owned television channel

Belarus 3 Беларусь 3
- Country: Belarus
- Broadcast area: Belarus
- Headquarters: Minsk, Belarus

Programming
- Languages: Russian, Belarusian
- Picture format: 1080i (16:9 HDTV)

Ownership
- Owner: National State Television and Radio Company of the Republic of Belarus
- Sister channels: Belarus 1 Belarus 2 Belarus 4 Belarus 5 Belarus 24; NTV Belarus; The First News Channel

History
- Launched: 8 March 2013; 13 years ago

Links
- Website: www.3belarus.by

Availability

Terrestrial
- DTT MUX 01: Channel 8

Streaming media
- tvr.by: Watch live

Belarus 3 (Belarusian: Беларусь 3) is a state-owned television channel in Belarus.

Created by Belteleradio in 2013, it is a cultural channel, broadcasting in both Russian and Belarusian languages.

== History ==
With the growing Russification of Belarus, more Belarusian-language programming gradually moved from the First Channel to its second network Lad, which, at launch in 2003, provided a limited amount of Belarusian programming.

Belarus-3 was announced by BTRC in February 2012; the initial goal was to test the channel in March.

The channel started broadcasting on 7:50a.m. on 8 February 2013 airing the ATN (Agency for Televisio News, a BTRC unit) documentary Horackija pacechi from the Zjamlja belaruskaja cycle. Most programs were cultural in nature; Kalyhanka, formerly of Belarus-1, moved to this channel as a result of its launch and expanded from five nights a week to seven. As of 2018, Belarusian-language programming accounted for 32% of the weekly total, an average of over five hours a day.

What set Belarus-3 apart from the other BTRC channels was the fact that it became the first digital-only channel to be launched by the corporation. At the time of launching, 96% of Belarusians were within the reach of the digital terrestrial platform (moreover, Belarus was in a transitional phase to digital). In 2017, the channel adopted a new graphics package and, in early 2018, in a special program for its fifth anniversary, announced that it would start broadcasting in HD soon.

In September 2020, an episode of Kalyhanka featured a story about a bear (Top) who deposed a fox (Yana) from the throne. Local bloggers considered it to be a satire of how Alexander Lukashenko got into power.

As of January 2023, nearly 850,000 viewers watched the channel daily.

== Programming ==
The channel specialises in programmes about Belarusian culture, music, and folk traditions. Many of its programmes are devoted to the Great Patriotic War.

- Dabraranak (бел. Дабраранак) - an entertaining and educational morning show for preschoolers and younger schoolchildren.
- Bielaruskaja kuchnia (eng. Belarusian cuisine) (бел. Беларуская кухня) - cooking show.
- Naviny kultury (eng. Cultural News) (бел. Навіны культуры) - daily cultural news.
- Kalychanka (eng. Lullaby) (бел. Калыханка) - evening children's show.
