= Belaya Rus =

Political party in Belarus

Belarusian Party "Belaya Rus": Белорусская партия «Белая Русь»; Беларуская партыя «Белая Русь»
- Abbreviation: PBR
- Chairman: Oleg Romanov
- Founded: 17 November 2007 (as a public association) 18 March 2023 (as a political party)
- Headquarters: 5th Building, Frunze Street, Minsk
- Membership (2023): 15,948
- Ideology: State nationalism; Left-conservatism; Pro-Lukashenko; Russophilia; Pan-Slavism
- Political position: Centre
- National affiliation: Republican Coordinating Council
- International affiliation: For the Freedom of Nations!
- Colours: Green; Red
- House of Representatives: 51 / 110
- Council of the Republic: 16 / 64
- Local seats: 3,234 / 12,514

Website
- partiya.by (political party); 1br.by (public association)

The Belarusian Party "Belaya Rus", (Note: Russian: Белорусская партия «Белая Русь»; Belarusian: Беларуская партыя «Белая Русь») or simply Belaya Rus, (Note: Russian and Belarusian: Белая Русь, romanized: Bělaja Ruś lit. 'White Rus'') is a centrist political party in Belarus. It supports the policies of Alexander Lukashenko, the first and only president of post-Soviet Belarus.

The Belaya Rus party originates from the Republican Public Association "Belaya Rus" (abbr. RPA "Belaya Rus"), (Note: Russian: Республиканское общественное объединение «Белая Русь», abbr. РОО «Белая Русь»; Belarusian: Рэспубліканскае грамадскае аб'яднанне "Белая Русь") founded in 2007 to support Lukashenko's presidency. While the association had previously been involved in elections and parliamentary activities, it has never been registered as a political party. In 2023, the membership of RPA "Belaya Rus" voted to create a new, separate political party alongside the association.

== History ==
Logo of RPA "Belaya Rus"

The founding congress of RPA "Belaya Rus" was held in Grodno on 17 November 2007 and attended by 470 delegates who elected a chair and leadership council with 85 members. Alexander Radkov, the then education minister of Belarus, was elected as chairman. RPA "Belaya Rus" was subsequently registered with the Belarusian authorities as a public association on 12 December.

RPA "Belaya Rus" held its first congress on 25 October 2008. A total of 380 delegates representing 82,000 members discussed and ultimately approved an organisational program.

On 19 January 2018, RPA "Belaya Rus" held a major congress in which domestic political analysts expected it to announce plans to register as a political party. Commentators noted that, since the association's inception, it had been focused on electoral and parliamentary participation. At the time of the congress, civil servants made up a majority of the association's membership. The association, however, did not announce a change in its legal status. Instead, a delegation of 500 people representing 178,000 members met in the National Library of Belarus in the capital Minsk and elected Gennady Davydko, the then head of Belteleradio, as their new chairman.

At its fourth congress on 18 June 2022, delegates elected Oleg Romanov, then rector of Saint Euphrosyne Polotsk State University, as its chairman.

RPA "Belaya Rus" held a congress on 18 March 2023, in which a thousand delegates voted to create a new political party. The Belarusian Party "Belaya Rus", or simply Belaya Rus, was subsequently established, with the leadership council unanimously approving the continuance of Romanov's chairmanship. Grigory Azarenok, a popular pro-Lukashenko TV presenter, was also elected to the party's leadership council. United Russia, the ruling party of Russia, expressed its support for the new party and invited its members to partake in interparty meetings.

In the 2024 Belarusian parliamentary election, the party won 46.4% of the popular vote and 51 seats in the House of Representatives.

== Ideology and program ==
Belaya Rus supports the presidency of Alexander Lukashenko, who has been the country's first and only president since 1994. At its inaugural party congress, Belaya Rus described itself as "an association of supporters of the first president of Belarus, Alexander Lukashenko, which seeks to preserve and develop his ideas and principles of building a sovereign Belarusian state". The party is also pro-Russia and has stated Belarusian energy independence as one of its long-term goals.

German civil lawyer Wolfram Nordsieck describes the party as centrist, statist, and agrarianist. The Carnegie Endowment for International Peace described the party as "relatively centrist". The party has also been described as state nationalist, pro-Russian–Belarusian integration, and as a party whose purpose is to promote the interests of Lukashenko. It is also pro-Russian, promotes an anti-Western foreign policy, and supports Pan-Slavism. Belaya Rus openly expresses nostalgia for the Soviet Union, rejects Western liberal-democratic values, and advocates for a closer integration with Russia.

Discussing left-conservatism in post-Soviet Russia and Belarus, Letian Lei of the Charles University has argued that the party espouses a 'quasi-socialism' or 'still-socialism' of a right-wing nature, although Lukashenko does not explicitly affiliate himself with the party nor with conservatism, as opposed to United Russia. Before it became a party, Lukashenko stated that he supports Belaya Rus "because they are patriots", but would not partake in its foundations and advised the association's members "not to rush into" formally becoming a political party. The party has close ties with the Party of Socialists of the Republic of Moldova.

== Membership ==
RPA "Belaya Rus" is the largest Belarusian public association by membership. It self-reported a membership of over 82,000 at its first congress on 25 October 2008. The association reportedly gave out its 100,000th membership card on 28 June 2010. RPA "Belaya Rus" claimed a membership of 178,000 at its congress held on 19 January 2018.

The Belaya Rus party reported an inaugural membership of 15,948 people at its founding congress. However, at the same time, RPA "Belaya Rus" had about 200,000 association members, most of whom had not yet officially registered as party members.

== Chairmen ==
1. Alexander Radkov (17 November 2007 – 19 January 2018)
2. Gennady Davydko (19 January 2018 – 18 June 2022)
3. Oleg Romanov (18 June 2022 – present)

== Election results ==
Belaya Rus presidential election results
Election	Candidate	First round		Second round		Result
Election	Candidate	Votes	%	Votes	%	Result
2025	Supported Alexander Lukashenko	5,136,293	86.82%	—N/a		Won

Belaya Rus legislative election results
Election	Leader	Performance					Rank	Government
Election	Leader	Votes	%	+/–	Seats	+/–	Rank	Government
2024	Oleg Romanov	2,343,664	46.40%	New	51 / 110	New	1st	Majority
