= Belarusian Telegraph Agency =

State-owned news agency

- Native name: Беларускае тэлеграфнае агенцтва
- Type: State media
- Founded: December 23, 1918
- Headquarters: Minsk, Belarus
- Products: Wire service
- Owner: Government of Belarus
- Website: belta.by

The Belarusian Telegraph Agency or BelTA (Belarusian: Беларускае Тэлеграфнае Агенцтва, romanized: Bielaruskaje Teliehrafnaje Ahienctva, Russian: Белорусское Телеграфное Агентство, БелТА) is the state-owned national news agency of the Republic of Belarus. It operates in Russian, Belarusian, English, German, Spanish, Polish and Chinese languages. Since 2018, the director of BELTA is Irina Akulovich.

Described as a propaganda outlet, Belta's chief directors were sanctioned by the Council of the European Union.

== History ==
=== 1918–1941 ===
The first independent informational organization in Belarus was established on 23 December 1918, as a regional department of the Russian Telegraph Agency (ROSTA), abbreviated as BELOTROSTA. Its primary objective was to inform the world about the formation of the Socialist Soviet Republic of Byelorussia, which occurred on 1 January 1919. Yuri Samoylovich Volin was appointed as its director. However, this organization struggled to launch successfully, existing for only a few months due to the Russian Civil War, and little information is available regarding that period.

The second attempt to launch happened on 14 January 1921, by order from Moscow, under the name of BelROSTA as a regional department of ROSTA. Vitold Frantsevich Akhramovich (Note: He was ethnically Polish.) was appointed as the director, who was replaced by Solomon Alexandrovich Levinson in the summer. Most of the initial few dozen correspondents had no professional experience and learned on the fly. BelROSTA prepared daily bulletins for the Republic's newspapers and wrote speeches proclaimed daily in factories and to troops. Another key task was to inform Moscow about events in Belarus and neighboring Poland. Although Levinson died in December 1921, his cadres laid the foundation for the organization's future.

On 18 January 1924, BelROSTA was reorganized into the Belarusian branch of the Union Commercial Telegraph Agency (BelCTA). Its main task was to cover the New Economic Policy, the reconstruction of the Soviet Union and related economic matters. In 1927, it employed 21 people, though most documents from that period didn't survive.

On 7 March 1931, BelCTA was reorganized into the Belarusian Telegraph Agency, or BelTA, the name it's known by today. While subordinate to the government of the Byelorussian SSR, it was also part of the TASS system. By 1932, BelTA had three editorial departments: one held a monopoly on covering information from the republican government, another for local news, and a third, which was required to operate in Belarusian, was responsible for relaying information from the TASS. It operated as a khozraschet organization, meaning it had to pay TASS for materials and for the local telegraph services used to receive them. In turn, BelTA sold its content to local newspapers. In the early 1930s, it had over 90 correspondents, most of whom were not on staff spread across 37 locations. BelTA experienced high staff turnover, with seven directors changing over nine years leading up to 1941.

=== 1941–1950 ===
Upon the German invasion of the Soviet Union, BelTA evacuated from Minsk and temporarily ceased operations. An attempt was made to revive it in July 1942 with a staff of 14 people, though without a director, but it ceased functioning again in 1943.

BelTA was re-established on 22 February 1944, becoming the main information agency of the Belarusian SSR. The first director, then working as a journalist in Arkhangelsk, was appointed by TASS. Following the war, the agency largely was staffed with former soldiers and partisans, supplemented by volunteers from Arkhangelsk. This resulted in a severe shortage of qualified personnel, with the director estimating that only two reporters had even "average" qualifications. By 1946, BelTA's staff had grown to 124 people, including 37 correspondents, all of whom required a recommendation from either TASS or the Communist Party of Byelorussia for appointment. Due to the severe destruction in Belarus, BelTA initially lacked sufficient equipment, possessing only five teleprinters, all of which were trophies from Germany. In 1950, it acquired more from Berlin.

=== 1950–1991 ===
By 1953, BelTA employed approximately 90 people. Fedor Kletskov became its director in 1955, serving for nearly 16 years—the longest tenure in the agency's history. In 1960, the Council of Ministers of the Belarusian SSR adopted a new statute for BelTA, which described the agency as a "central informational organ" of the BSSR.

In 1971–1972, BelTA was reorganized, obtaining the status of a Republican State Committee. This period brought a new statute, a change in leadership, and significant personnel shifts. Among the important changes, BelTA was now explicitly tasked with ideological work, such as exposing the "aggressive politics of imperialism" and glorifying the successes of "Leninist national politics." In the mid-1970s, BelTA had 22 correspondents and published 1,460 newspaper pages monthly.

During glasnost and perestroika, BelTA reverted to khozraschet and covered the political transformation of the Soviet Union. As the media evolved, BelTA faced competition, alongside accusations of bias and threats from a variety of political factions.

=== 1991–present ===
During the Soviet times BelTA cooperated with the Telegraph Agency of the Soviet Union (TASS), although it was legally independent of it.

After the USSR ceased to exist in 1991, BelTA has been the national news agency of Belarus. It transmits over a hundred daily reports, and provides information to other news agencies of Commonwealth of Independent States members about the activities of Belarusian officials and organizations in and out of the country.

BelTA has offices in all regions of Belarus, as well as abroad. The main office is in Minsk.

In April 2026, the YouTube channel of BelTA was deleted. It happened one day after the channel published the phone number and address of a Belarusian opposition member.

== List of directors ==
| No. | Director | Term | | |
| No. | Director | Took office | Left office | Duration |
|---|---|---|---|---|
| 1 | Yuri Samoylovich Volin | December 1918 | | |
| 2 | Vitold Frantsevich Akhramovich | January 1921 | July 1921 | 6 months |
| 3 | Solomon Alexandrovich Levinson | August 1921 | 6 December 1921 | 4 months |
| 4 | G.A. Grigoriev | December 1921 | | |
| 5 | B.L. Belogorsky | January 1922 | | |
| 6 | G.A. Grigoriev | 18 January 1924 | | |
| 7 | Borukh Iserovich Tabaynik | July 1932 | 1934 | |
| 8 | Grigory Mikhailovich Gurevich | September 1934 | 20 May 1935 | 8 months |
| 9 | Veniamin Romanovich Balzovsky | July 1935 | October 1935 | 3 months |
| 10 | Rabinovich | November 1935 | January 1936 | 2 months |
| 11 | Gushchin | May 1936 | September 1937 | 1 years and 4 months |
| 12 | Andrey Ivanovich Krizhevich | 31 December 1937 | 2 March 1939 | 1 year, 2 months and 2 days |
| 13 | Mikhail Markovich Chaussky | 22 February 1939 | June 1941 | 2 years and 4 months |
| 14 | Alexander Mikhailovich Tretyakov | 5 March 1944 | December 1945 | 1 year and 9 months |
| 15 | Mikhail Vasilievich Morozov | 27 December 1945 | 30 April 1955 | 9 years, 4 months and 3 days |
| 16 | Fedor Egorovich Kletskov | May 1955 | January 1971 | 15 years and 8 months |
| 17 | Nikolay Timofeevich Marushkevich | 25 January 1971 | 22 March 1982 | 11 years, 1 month and 25 days |
| 18 | Petr I. Berezhkov | 22 March 1982 | 24 June 1986 | 4 years, 3 months and 2 days |
| 19 | Vladimir Pavlovich Khilkevich | 24 June 1986 | 28 November 1988 | 2 years, 4 months and 4 days |
| 20 | Yakov Yakovlevich Alekseychik | 22 December 1988 | 6 December 2002 | 13 years, 11 months and 14 days |
| 21 | Oleg Vitoldovich Proleskovsky | 6 December 2002 | 25 March 2003 | 3 months and 19 days |
| 22 | Dmitry Alexandrovich Zhuk | 2 May 2003 | 6 February 2018 | 14 years, 9 months and 4 days |
| 23 | Irina Borisovna Akulovich | 5 April 2018 | Current | 8 years, 4 months and 28 days |

== Criticism ==
Some observers called BelTA a propaganda outlet.

The BelTA Director-General Dzmitry Zhuk was banned from entering the European Union between 2011 and 2016 as part of the EU's sanctions against Belarus following what the EU describes as a crackdown of opposition protests after the 2010 presidential election. According to the EU Council's decision concerning restrictive measures against Belarus following the 2010 election, Dzmitry Zhuk is responsible for "relaying state propaganda in the media, which has supported and justified the repression of the democratic opposition and of civil society on December 19, 2010 using falsified information."

The BelTA Director-General Irina Akulovich came under EU and Swiss sanctions in summer 2024.

== See also ==
- Propaganda in Belarus
- Media of Belarus
- Eastern Bloc media and propaganda
