= Anatoliy Azarenkov =

Ukrainian coach and a former footballer

Personal information
- Full name: Anatoliy Oleksandrovych Azarenkov
- Date of birth: 5 April 1938 (age 88)
- Place of birth: Odesa, Ukraine, Soviet Union
- Height: 1.80 m (5 ft 11 in)
- Position: Forward

Youth career
- FC Dzerzhynets Odesa

Senior career*
Years	Team	Apps	(Gls)
1957	Pishchevyk Odesa	?	(?)
1958–1959	Shakhtar Novovolynsk	?	(?)
1960	Volyn Lutsk	22	(3)
1961	Chornomorets Odesa	18	(2)
1962	Avanhard Chernivtsi	28	(7)
1963	Chornomorets Odesa	2	(0)
1964–1966	Sudnobudivnyk Mykolaiv	83	(1)
1967–1968	Kryvbas Kryvyi Rih	76	(2)

Managerial career
- 1969–1971: Kryvbas Kryvyi Rih (assistant)
- 1972–1974: Kryvbas Kryvyi Rih (director)
- 1975–1976: Sudnobudivnyk Mykolaiv (director)
- 1977–1978: Chornomorets Odesa (director)
- 1981: Kolos Nikopol (assistant)
- 1981–1984: Dnipro Dnipropetrovsk (assistant)
- 1985: Kryvbas Kryvyi Rih
- 1986: Dnipro Dnipropetrovsk (assistant)
- 1986–1990: Syria
- 1991: Tiligul Tiraspol (assistant)
- 1992: Syria
- 1993: Al-Ahli
- 1993–1997: Kuwait U-20
- 1998–1999: Al-Arabi
- 1999–2001: Chornomorets Odesa
- 2004–2008: Chornomorets Odesa (science methodic group)
- * Club domestic league appearances and goals

Anatoliy Oleksandrovych Azarenkov (born 5 April 1938) is a Ukrainian coach and a former footballer. He was born in the city of Odesa, Ukraine. As a player, he played for Chornomorets Odesa, Shakhtar Novovolynsk, Volyn Lutsk, Avanhard Chernivtsi, Sudnobudivnyk Mykolaiv and Kryvbas Kryvyi Rih. He coached Kryvbas Kryvyi Rih, Syria, Omani Al-Ahli, Kuwait U-20, Qatari Al-Arabi and Chornomorets Odesa. Honorary coach of Ukraine in 1983.
