= Council of People's Commissars of Byelorussia =

Political organization in the Byelorussian SSR (1920–1946)

The Council of People's Commissars of Byelorussia was established part of the governing apparatus of the Byelorussian Soviet Socialist Republic (BSSR). It was formed by the All-Byelorussian Congress of Soviets and functioned alongside the Central Executive Committee. Under the 1919 constitution the Council of People's Commissars belongs to the general management of the affairs of the BSSR. The Council of People's Commissars was empowered to issue decrees, orders and instructions, and to generally take whatever measures necessary for the proper and prompt management of the state. However any decisions of great general political importance were to be submitted for ratification by the Congress of Soviets, which could over-rule the decisions of the Council of People's Commissars.

== People's Commissariats ==
According to the 1919 constitution, 15 People's Commissariats were established.

1. Foreign Affairs
2. Military Affairs,
3. Internal Affairs
4. Justice
5. Labour
6. Social Security
7. Public Education
8. Finance
9. Council of the National Economy,
10. Farming
11. Public communication
12. Health,
13. Workers and Peasants Inspection,
14. Food
15. Emergency Commission of Byelorussia.

== See also ==
- Council of People's Commissars of the Russian Soviet Federative Socialist Republic
- Council of People's Commissars of the Soviet Union
