= Belarus-2 =

Belarusian state-owned television channel

Belarus 2 Беларусь 2
- Country: Belarus
- Broadcast area: Belarus
- Headquarters: Minsk, Belarus

Programming
- Languages: Russian, Belarusian
- Picture format: 1080i (16:9 HDTV)

Ownership
- Owner: National State Television and Radio Company of the Republic of Belarus
- Sister channels: Belarus 1 Belarus 3 Belarus 4 Belarus 5 Belarus 24; NTV Belarus; The First News Channel

History
- Launched: 18 October 2003; 22 years ago
- Former names: LAD (2003–2011)

Links
- Website: www.news.by

Availability

Streaming media
- tvr.by: Watch live

Belarus 2 (Belarusian: Беларусь 2) is a state-owned television channel in Belarus.

It is an educational and entertainment TV channel created in 2003 by Belteleradiocompany, which until 2011 carried the name LAD (ЛАД). The channel broadcasts in both Belarusian and Russian languages.

== History ==
LAD was launched as Belteleradio's second television channel, in opposition to ONT, while established as a de facto second television network, upon its creation, it was considered as separate from the BTRC.

In late 2002, BTRC started planning the creation of a second television network - the third network overall - under the tentative name Spadchyna (Спадчына, Heritage). The initiative behind the name of the channel was not up to Belteleradio. The name Lad eventually won and was selected for the new network. The channel's launch was announced in September 2003, scheduled to launch the following month. It was positioned as a "family channel" with the aim of its viewers being united by "universal traditional values: family happiness, love and mutual respect, harmony and tolerance, responsibility and pride for the country", while refusing to show programs that contained aggressivity, violence and propaganda in favor of bad habits.

The channel replaced Russian channel Kultura in some areas of Belarus, including the capital Minsk. The politically neutral VGTRK channel was commercial-free, which had no insertions for local commercials in Belarusian relays. The move coincided with the development of Belarusian television, as ONT replaced the Channel One Russia relay network the previous year, with numerous Russian networks being removed from the terrestrial network in favor of local services. Expectations were set for the channel practicing the same bilingualism as BT-1. It was also set up under the basis of five regional networks in areas outside of Minsk, which blocked Russian network relays in the process.

Kultura ceased broadcasting on cable operators and terrestrial television on October 17, 2003. The launch of LAD implied that operators should sign an agreement with the VGTRK to carry state-owned Russian channel Russia and Kultura, but due to broadcasting rights issues with local networks, it was determined that the broadcast of the Russian networks was to be limited to inter-state agreements, which Belarus refused, as well as dependence on Russia's state budget. In Brest, the channel replaced local channel BST.

In Minsk, LAD was the family channel the company wanted it to be, while in five other regions, it was shared with the BTRC regional TV companies. Its slogan was Лад у сям`i - згода ў краiне (Order in the family, harmony in the country); Lad meaning "order". The channel started broadcasting on October 18, 2003. LAD's director of programming Alexander Semernev said that no topic was taboo on the channel, under the grounds that "cruelty is an objective reality". The channel aired a restricted number of movies given the channel's editorial guidelines. Each morning started with coverage of regional events, and each region had its own news bulletin. Co-operation with the regional stations wasn't restricted to the news, with these centers producing cultural programming to air on the channel. Some programs moved from BT-1 to LAD, while its schedule was built on the basis of the days of the week: Mondays to surpass the stress of a new week and Fridays to prepare for the weekend.

Despite aiming to be a family-friendly channel, it received attention for airing the Russian talk-show Okna (The Windows), which had been cancelled by STS and moved to TNT. Some areas had no access to relays of Russian channels over-the-air as a result of its launch. There was also the fact that Kultura had no value for Belarusians and that some programming choices didn't match what the corporation had in mind for LAD, especially Okna, which was the only channel in the world to air at the time. Programming in Belarusian was limited to dubbed animated series which were under the umbrella of a co-operation agreement with France's CFI; the rest was all in Russian.

The channel unveiled a new slogan and a new schedule in October 2006, the month of its third anniversary. Among the new programs was Танцуют все! (Everybody Dances!), modelled after international formats such as Dancing with the Stars and Dancing on Ice.

On October 28, 2011, Belteleradio announced that LAD was to be renamed Belarus-2 from November 14, 2011. The channel was repositioned as an entertainment and sports service. HD broadcasts started on March 30, 2018, as part of a company-wide conversion.

== Programming ==
Entertainment shows and educational programs, comedy series and sketch shows, movie premieres and masterpieces of the world cinema. It is an interactive TV channel. Viewers have the opportunity to watch it online and communicate with the creative team of each project through social media, participate in the content creation.
