= Grigory Azarenok =

Belarusian journalist (born 1995)

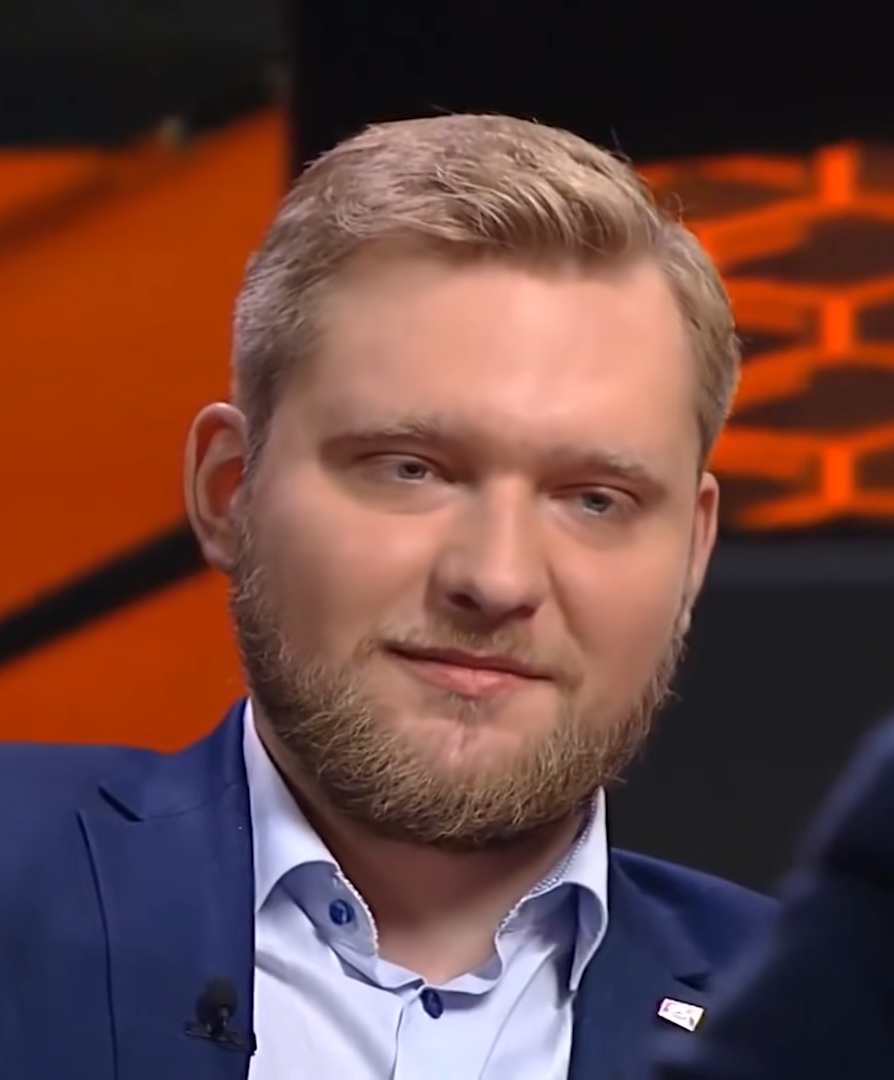
- Azarenok in 2021

Personal details
- Born: 18 October 1995 (age 30)
- Party: Belaya Rus
- Parent: Yuri Azarenok (father)
- Relatives: Viktor Azarenok (uncle)

Grigory Yuryevich Azarenok (Russian: Григорий Юрьевич Азарёнок, Belarusian: Рыгор Юр’евіч Азаронак; born 18 October 1995) is a Belarusian journalist, television presenter and politician. He has been described as "the most loyal propagandist" of president Alexander Lukashenko.

Azaronak began working for Capital TV while in university, and returned to the channel after serving in the army. He initially reported on life in Minsk and the Minsk region, and later gained prominence as a correspondent for the 2020 protests. In 2021, he became the first journalist to be awarded the Medal for Bravery. At the founding congress of Belaya Rus in 2023, he was elected member of its supreme political council. In May 2023, he became a host at Vladimir Solovyov's channel on Rutube. As of 2024, his YouTube channels had been deleted six times. He is the son of Yuri Azarenok and the nephew of Viktor Azarenok.
