= Belarus Today =

Belarusian state run media enterprise

Belarus Today СБ. Беларусь сегодня
- Type: State run media enterprise
- Format: Print, Radio, Television, Online
- Owner(s): Presidential Administration of Belarus
- Editor: Dzmitry Zhuk
- Founded: August 2, 1927
- Political alignment: Marxism-Leninism (1927-1991); Belarus (since 1994)
- Language: Russian
- Country: Byelorussian SSR (1927-1991); Belarus (since 1991)
- Website: www.sb.by Official Website

Belarus Today (Note: Sometimes referred to as SB. Belarus Today) (Belarusian: СБ. Беларусь сегодня, romanized: SB. Bielaruś siehodnia; Russian: Беларусь Сегодня) is a state run publisher in Belarus; it controls numerous media entities such as their current namesake publication Belarus Today.

It was named Sovetskaya Belorussiya – Belarus' Segodnya previously.

Dzmitry Zhuk, the editor-in-chief of Sovetskaya Belorussiya, came under EU and Swiss sanctions in summer 2024.

== See also ==
- Mass media in Belarus

== Editorial Board ==
- Editor-in-Chief — Dmitry Alexandrovich Zhuk (since 2018)
- First Deputy Editor-in-Chief — Mikhail Petrovich Lebedik
- Deputy Editors-in-Chief — Alexander Mikhailovich Taranda, Sergey Alexandrovich Gordienko, Galina Mikhailovna Toropetskaya

== History ==
The newspaper has been published since August 9, 1927. Until 1937, it was known as Rabochy (“The Worker”). From 1937 to 2018, it was titled Soviet Belarus. In September 2018, the name was changed to Soviet Belarus — Belarus Today (SB. Belarus Today). Since 1943, the newspaper has been published in both Belarusian and Russian. In 1964, it was awarded the Order of the Red Banner of Labor. Since 2000, the newspaper has been published in color format. In 2013, it was merged with four other major publications (Narodnaya Gazeta, Respublika, Selskaya Gazeta, and Znamya Yunosti) into a single media holding: Belarus Today.

== Projects ==
In partnership with Soviet Belarus, several media projects were launched, including the newspaper Soyuz, the magazine Spetsnaz, and the English-language newspaper The Minsk Times.

The Belarus Today Publishing House also participates in a historical archival project, “Partisans of Belarus,” in cooperation with the National Archives of the Republic of Belarus. The project aims to digitize personnel records of decorated Belarusian partisans and underground resistance members, ultimately creating a publicly accessible online database enriched with newly digitized archival documents.
