= Belarus-1 =

Belarusian state-owned television channel

Belarus 1 Беларусь 1
- Country: Belarus
- Broadcast area: CIS region – Belarus, Russia, Ukraine; Europe – Poland, Lithuania, Latvia
- Headquarters: Minsk, Belarus

Programming
- Languages: Russian, Belarusian
- Picture format: 1080i (16:9 HDTV)

Ownership
- Owner: National State Television and Radio Company of the Republic of Belarus
- Sister channels: Belarus 2 Belarus 3 Belarus 4 Belarus 5 Belarus 24; NTV-Belarus

History
- Launched: 1 January 1956; 70 years ago
- Replaced by: TeleExpo
- Former names: The Belarusian Program of Central Television (1956); Television Belarusian Channel (TBK) (1992); Belarusian Television (BT) (1996–2006); First National Channel, Pervyj (2006–2011)

Links
- Website: www.news.by

Availability

Terrestrial
- DVB-T: MUX 1 (1)
- Belintersat-1: 11350 H

Streaming media
- tvr.by: Watch live

Belarus 1 (Belarusian: Беларусь 1) is a state-owned television channel in Belarus.

It is the oldest television channel in the country. The channel is on air from 6:00 am to 2:00 am on the next day, in contrast with most public channels in Europe, which broadcast 24-hour programming. It is used to spread propaganda in Belarus.

== History ==
Logo of Belarus 1 from 1991 to 1996, with a stylized white-red-white flag in the logo's text.

The channel was launched on 1 January 1956, as the Belarusian branch of the Soviet Central Television, after months of preparation. The first spoken words were "Good evening! Happy New Year. Today, we start our test run." spoken by Tamara Bastun. Broadcasts were initially running for 2–3 hours every evening on Thursdays, Fridays and Saturdays. In the 1960s, two-program television was formed (based on the broadcasts of the First Program of Moscow Central Television).

Since the mid-60s, its own production of feature and documentary television films began (based on the main editorial office of "Telefilm"). In 1962, with the release of Intervision Network, an exchange of programs with other republics began. In the 1970-1980s, television broadcasting already covered 95% of the territory of Belarus. Since 1972, programs have been broadcast on 3 programs, including color programs of its own production (since 1974). In 1978, the hardware and studio complex of the Belarusian Radio Television Center was put into operation, which made it possible to increase the volume and quality of color images. In January 1981, 6 TVK launched an independent Belarusian program that did not overlap with programs from Moscow. In terms of the volume of its own production, it ranked 6th in the USSR, and its programs were watched by 86% of the residents of Belarus. The broadcasting structure of the national TV channel consisted of 3 blocks: informational and journalistic, scientific and educational, and artistic.

In 1992, the "Belarusian Program" was renamed the "Television Belarusian Channel" ("TBK"). Since 1993, "TBK" has become a full member of the European Broadcasting Union.

In 1995, the Television News Agency was created, producing informational and analytical programs for Belarusian television ("Novosti", "Panorama", "Resonance" (until the early 2000s)), as well as documentaries.

In June 1996, the name "TBK" was changed to "Belarusian Television" (BT). Since the early 2000s, BT has been referred to on air as the "First National TV Channel" (this name was assigned to the channel in 2006). In November 2011, the TV channel changed its name to "Belarus 1", new projects and graphic design were aired. In October 2021, minor changes were made to the design of the TV channel's broadcast.

Since the mid-1990s, the amount of Belarusian-language content on the channel has gradually decreased. In the early 2000s, only news and a few other programs (as well as inter-program design) were broadcast on BT in Belarusian. In February 2003, a survey was conducted by order of the Belteleradiocompany, based on the results of which it was decided to leave only cultural programs in Belarusian. Until 2004, the Belarusian-language design of the channel and some programs, in particular news (screensavers, banners, subtitles) was retained.

On November 5, 2011, Pervyj was renamed Belarus-1.

On March 30, 2018, the TV channel switched to broadcasting in high definition (HD).

== Censorship and propaganda ==
International experts and the Belarusian democracy movement have traditionally called state television one of the most important propaganda tools of Lukashenko's regime. It is accused of disinformation, propaganda of political repression, election manipulation, and insulting critics of the regime.

Employees and top managers of state television companies, including Belteleradiocompany, which owns Belarus 1, have been repeatedly put in the EU-led list of people and organizations sanctioned in relation to human rights violations in Belarus, have been included in the Specially Designated Nationals and Blocked Persons List, the sanction lists of the United Kingdom, Switzerland.

According to a journalist who left the channel during the 2020–2021 Belarusian protests in August 2020, Belarus 1 was severely censored. For example, there was a list of people whose names could not be mentioned in the news, which included opposition politicians, there was a blacklist of economists and political scientists, who could not be asked for comments, the use of the words "Stalinism," "cult of personality," and "Gulag" was prohibited. TV news unit journalist Alyaksandr Luchonak, who also resigned in protest of propaganda, also confirmed the existence of censorship.
