= Belteleradio =

State-owned broadcaster of Belarus

Coordinates: 53°55′23″N 27°37′44″E

National State TV and Radio Company of the Republic of Belarus
- Type: Broadcast radio and television, online
- Country: Belarus
- Availability: National
- Headquarters: Makayonka St. 9, Minsk
- Owner: Government of Belarus
- Key people: Ivan Eismont (Chairman)
- Launch date: 15 November 1925; 100 years ago (Radio); 1 January 1956; 70 years ago (Television)
- Former names: Belteleradio (1 January 1956 – 25 September 1991)
- Official website: Official website

The National State TV and Radio Company of the Republic of Belarus (Note: (Belarusian: Нацыянальная дзяржаўная тэлерадыёкампанія Рэспублікі Беларусь, romanized: Natsyyanalnaya dzyarzhawnaya teleradyyokampaniya Respubliki Belarus; Russian: Национальная государственная телерадиокомпания Республики Беларусь, romanized: Natsionalnaya gosudarstvennaya teleradiokompaniya Respubliki Belarus), known as Belteleradiocompany (Belarusian: Белтэлерадыёкампанія; Russian: Белтелерадиокомпания)) or simply Belteleradio, is a state-owned television and radio broadcasting service in Belarus.

From 1993 until 2021, it was a full active member of the European Broadcasting Union (EBU) under the name Belarusian Television and Radio Company (BTRC). In May 2021, the EBU Executive Board agreed to suspend BTRC as a member of the broadcasting union effective 11 June 2021. The broadcaster later іndіcated that the suspension would expire in 2024, but this was later denied by the EBU a couple months prior to when the suspension hypothetically would have been lifted as they publicly addressed that it had "no reason" to reinstate BTRC's membership "at the current time". This means that BTRC's membership is indefinitely suspended, and as a result cannot rejoin the organisation. Until the suspension is lifted or another Belarusian member joins in its place, there are presently no members of the EBU who are from Belarus.

== History ==
=== Early years (1925–1933) ===
The first service of Belarusian radio went on air on 15 November 1925, at the RB-10 radio station named after the Council of People's Commissars of the BSSR. The programs were broadcast for 30 minutes a day within a radius of up to 300 km. Starting in 1926, broadcasts of radio newscasts for workers and peasants started, followed by broadcasts from theaters and clubs and music programs. From 1928, wire broadcasting developed, a weekly broadcasting schedule was formed, taking into account the professional and age characteristics of the target audience. The 1920s also saw the development of regional and district broadcasting. 70-80% of all broadcasting was in Belarusian.

=== Radio Committee of the BSSR (1933–1953) ===
In 1933, the Committee for Radio Information and Radio Broadcasting of the Council of People's Commissars of the Belarusian SSR was established. Technical advancements, including the construction of a powerful radio station in Kolodischi, enabled live broadcasting. Sound recording devices were first utilized by Belarusian radio in 1936. By 1938, broadcasting commenced from the new Radio House, which featured three new studios and a workshop for mechanical broadcasting and sound recording.

Following German invasion of the Soviet Union, the RV-10 radio station temporarily suspended its operations. On 1 January 1942, the "Soviet Belarus" radio station began broadcasting on short waves from Moscow. Simultaneously, the German occupation administration launched the "Landessender Minsk" radio station. Initially under the control of the Reich Broadcasting Corporation, it was subordinated to the Reich Ministry of Public Enlightenment and Propaganda in 1944. This station broadcast in German and Belarusian, with news sometimes also delivered in Russian. The RV-10 radio station resumed broadcasting in 1944, first from liberated Gomel, and subsequently from Minsk.

=== Radio Directorate of the BSSR (1953–1957) ===
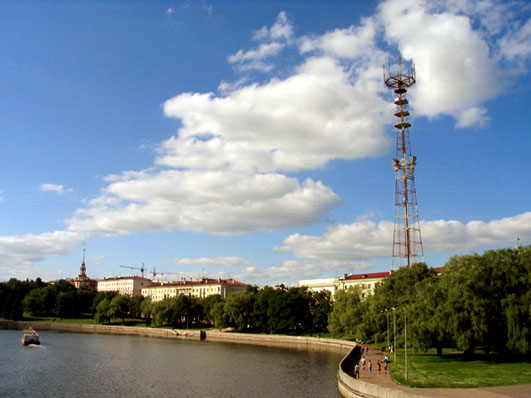
Broadcasting tower of the BTRC at 6 Kamunistychnaya st.

In 1953, the Radio Committee of the Belarusian SSR was reorganized into the Main Directorate of Radio Information of the Ministry of Culture of the Belarusian SSR. The 1950s saw the beginning of intensive efforts to improve the quality of radio broadcasting. New equipment was installed in the House of Radio, enhancing the quality of recorded broadcasts.

Work on the television station was underway in 1955, with the Minsk telecenter being commissioned that same year. On 1 January 1956, the Radio Directorate of the BSSR launched its television service, "Belarusian Television" (BT). The inaugural broadcast lasted two hours and was watched by 4,500 viewers. The initial TV schedule primarily featured feature films, newsreels, concerts, and performances, sourced from Moscow and local movie distribution centers. Information programs were often supplemented with film and photographic materials. By the late 1950s, the Directorate had begun live broadcasts and the production of documentaries and television plays. By the end of that decade, Belarus had 30,000 television sets.

=== Gosteleradio of Belarusian SSR (1957–1991) ===
In 1957, the Radio Control of the Belarusian SSR was reorganized into the State Committee of the Belarusian SSR on Television and Radio Broadcasting (Gosteleradio). In the 1960s, 70% of the territory of Belarus was provided with television. A two-program TV was formed (based on the programs of the 1st program of the Moscow Central Television). In 1960, complete radio coverage of Belarus was completed, new radio stations appeared: "Belarus" (1962), which provided regular broadcasting to foreign countries, "Belarusian Youth" (1963), "Rural Life" (1964). In 1968, The department of theory and practice of radio broadcasting and television was opened at the Faculty of Journalism of the Belarusian State University with the aim of training qualified personnel. The volume of its own broadcasting was 880 hours a year, with a third of that dedicated to political education. In the mid-1960s, its own production of feature and documentary television films began (on the basis of the main editorial office of Telefilm). In 1962, with the starting of Intervision, an exchange of programs with other republics began. In 1961, the Minsk Television Studio and the Committee for Radio and Television were merged into one creative team, in March 1964 it was renamed into the Studio of the Belarusian Television.

In the 1970s, 22 radio broadcasting stations operated on the territory of Belarus. During this period, the transition to 3-program wire broadcasting was carried out, stereo broadcasting was formed on ultrashort waves. In 1972 the State Television and Radio Broadcasting of the BSSR launched the Krynitsa radio station on medium waves. By the beginning of the 80s, there were 6 regional bureaux, 115 district, 12 city and 32 factory radios. In the 1970s and 1980s, television broadcasting covered already 95% of the territory of Belarus. Since 1972, the programs have been broadcast on 3 programs, including color programs of its own production (since 1974). In 1978, the hardware-studio complex of the Belarusian Radio Television Center was put into operation, which made it possible to increase the volume and quality of the color image. In January 1981, Channel 6 aired an independent Belarusian program, which was not covered by programs from Moscow. In terms of the volume of its own production, it occupied the 6th place in the USSR, and its programs were watched by 86% of the inhabitants of Belarus. The broadcasting structure of the national TV channel consisted of 3 blocks: information and journalistic, scientific and educational and artistic.

=== State TV and Radio of the Republic of Belarus (1991–1994) ===
In September 1991, the State Television and Radio Broadcasting of the BSSR was renamed the State Committee of the Republic of Belarus on Television and Radio Broadcasting. In the early 1990s, the unified system of state television in Belarus included 6 television centers, 50 transmitters, and more than 2000 radio relay communication lines. This made it possible to repurpose the program to a more powerful 1st communication channel. The average daily volume of republican and regional broadcasting was 14.5 hours. Gosteleradio became a full member of the European Broadcasting Union in 1993. The 1990s ushered in a new stage for Belarusian radio broadcasting; during this decade, the number of non-state-owned TV channels grew to 150, and their programming increasingly focused on entertainment.

=== Belteleradiocompany (since 1994) ===
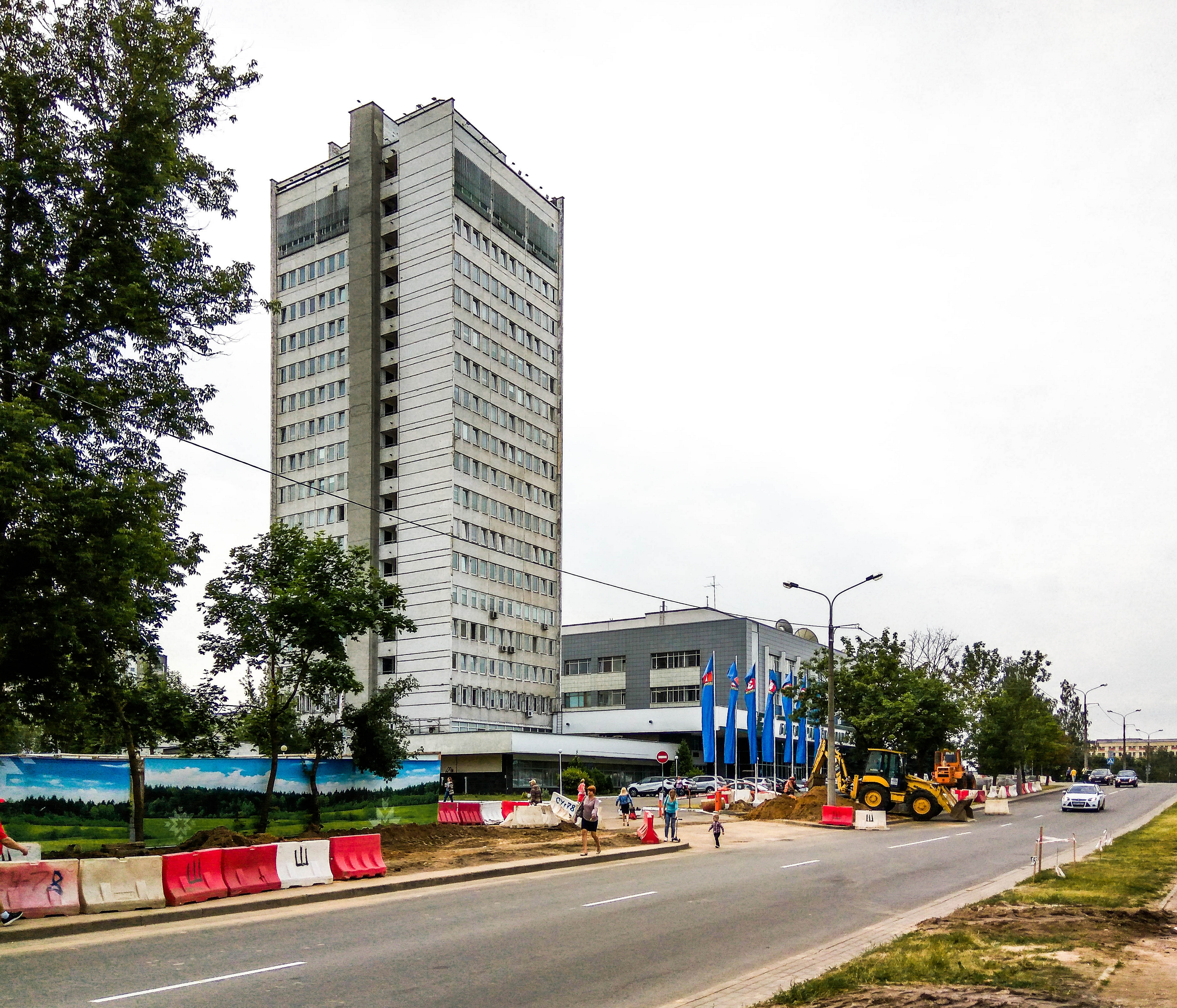
BTRC headquarters at Makayonka St. 9, Minsk (2018)

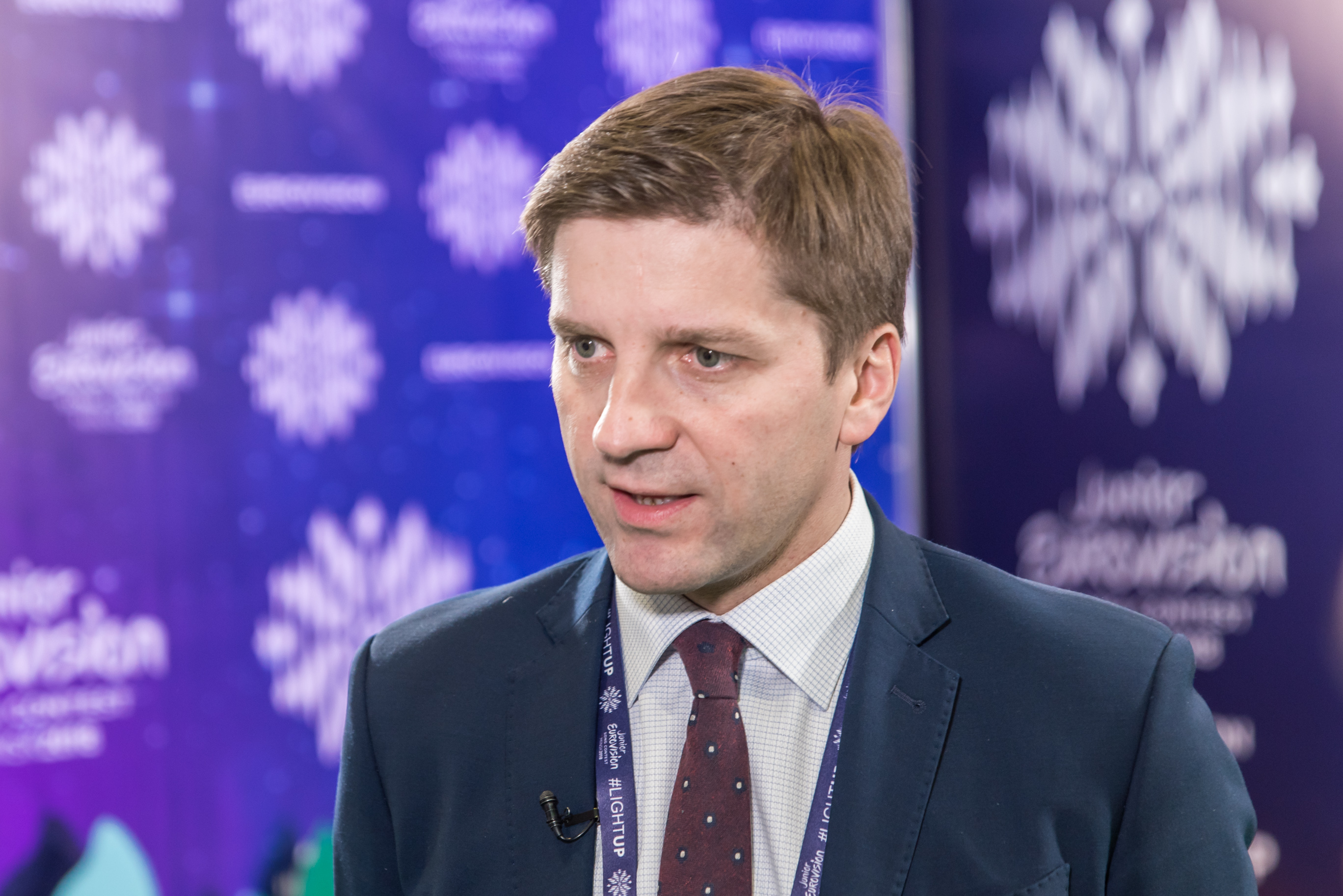
Ivan Eismont, Director General and Chair of Belteleradio since March 2018

In August 1994, the President of Belarus established Belteleradiocompany. News reporting was then delegated to the newly created Television News Agency in 1995. Television experimented with new modes of reporting, such as debates and talk shows. The first Belarusian TV series premiered in 1999.

In 1998, Belteleradio launched the Stolitsa radio station, which was the only Belarusian-language radio station covering all of Belarus. Since 1998, Belarusian radio began broadcasting to Russia and Ukraine. Belarus launched its first family channel, LAD, in 2003, followed by the state satellite international channel, Belarus-TV, in 2005. Experiments with digital TV began in 2004, with the first transmissions starting in 2005.

Since 2005, all channels and radio stations of the Belarusian Radio were now being streamed live on the Internet. From 22 December 2005, to 28 December 2010, Alexander Zimovsky was the chairman of the Belteleradio.

From October 2009, to December 2013, Belteleradio was exempt from paying income and value-added tax. November 2011 saw the rebranding of two channels: Channel One was renamed "Belarus 1", and LAD was redesignated "Belarus 2". Subsequently, in 2013, "Belarus TV" was renamed "Belarus 24," and the digital socio-cultural TV channel "Belarus 3" was launched. In 2016, Belarus closed down its cable radio service.

In August 2020, protests and strikes were held against the results of the 2020 presidential elections in Belarus. Hundreds of Belteleradio's 1,500 employees went on strike, demanding the annulment of the election results.

In May 2021, the European Broadcasting Union suspended Belteleradio's membership, citing concerns regarding the confession of Roman Protasevich broadcast by the company, which was reportedly obtained under duress. On 30 June, Belteleradio was expelled from the EBU due to its use as a propaganda tool by the Belarusian government. The proposal for expulsion was put forward by Sweden. Although initial reports mentioned that it would expire after three years, in April 2024 the EBU confirmed that the suspension had been made indefinite.

== Services ==
=== Television ===
Belteleradiocompany operates eight television channels, of which seven are distributed nationally and one is distributed internationally.

- Belarus 1 – News, current affairs, and general interest programming
- Belarus 2 – Entertainment and sports programming
- Belarus 3 – Cultural programming, mostly broadcasts in Belarusian language
- Belarus 4 – Regional news, entertainment and cultural programming. Broadcasts separately for Brest, Vitebsk, Gomel, Grodno, Minsk and Mogilev regions
- Belarus 5 – Sports channel
  - Belarus 5 Internet – Online sports TV channel
- Belarus 24 – International channel catering to viewers outside of Belarus
- NTV-Belarus – Belarusian version of NTV Russia; programming consists of content from NTV Russia and other Russian channels
- The First News Channel – News channel that started in September 2024.

=== Radio ===
Belteleradiocompany operates two national radio services and three regional FM services.

- First National Channel of Belarusian Radio – The largest national radio channel in Belarus
- Radio Belarus – National and international service with programming in seven languages (Belarusian, English, French, German, Polish, Russian, and Spanish)
- Radio channel "Culture" – Regional FM service, cultural and musical programming.
- Radio "Stolitsa" – Regional FM service, local programming.
- Radius-FM – Regional FM service, youth-oriented music station.

=== Internet ===
- sport5.by
- news.by

== Censorship and propaganda ==
International experts and the Belarusian opposition name the state TV as one of the main instruments of propaganda by the authoritarian regime of Alexander Lukashenko. It is being accused of misinformation, advocating political repressions and rigging of elections, smearing regime critics.

== Leadership ==
Name	Position
Ivan Eismont	Chairman
Sergey Gusachenko	First Deputy Chairman
Dmitry Primshits	Deputy Chairman
Andrey Ivanets	Deputy Chairman
Gleb Shulman	Deputy Chairman
Olga Shlyager	General Producer of General Production Center
Anton Vasyukevich	General Producer of General Production Center of the Belarusian Radio
Natalya Gorokhovik	Chief Director of the Main Directorate of The First News Channel
Elena Ladutko	Chief Director of the Main Directorate of the Belarus 1 TV channel
Elena Obraztsova	Chief Director of the Main Directorate of the Belarus 2 TV channel
Natalya Marinova	Chief Director of the Main Directorate of the Belarus 3 TV channel
Pavel Bulatskiy	Chief Director of the Main Directorate of the Belarus 5 TV channel
Pavel Lazovik	Chief Director of the Main Directorate of the Belarus 24 TV channel
Ekaterina Biretskaya	Chief Director of the Main Directorate of the NTV-Belarus TV channel
Maksim Uglyanitsa	Chief Director of the Main Directorate of the First Nation Channel
Valery Radutskiy	Chief Director of the Main Directorate of International Broadcasting (Radio Belarus)
Vladimir Kazakov	Director of the Directorate of the radio station "Stalitsa"
Elena Treshchinskaya	Director of the radio station "Radius-FM"
Svetlana Kolmak	Director of the Directorate of the "Culture" radio channel
Aleksander Khorovets	Chief Director of the Main Directorate of Internet Broadcasting
Yuri Kolyachko	Chief Director of the Main Technical Directorate
Viktoriya Popova	Head of the Belteleradiocompany Press Service Department

== International sanctions ==
Employees and top managers of state TV channels, including channels of BTRC, have several times been subjects to sanctions from the EU and the United States.

In 2022, the company was placed on the European Union, Canada, Switzerland, and Ukraine sanctions lists.

On 19 September 2024, eighteen BTRC-owned YouTube channels were blocked by the Lithuanian authorities. This came after LRT solicited YouTube's parent company Google to suspend all of BTRC's channels in the country in July
