= Belarus 24 =

International broadcaster of Belarus

Belarus 24 Беларусь 24
- Country: Belarus
- Broadcast area: CIS region, worldwide
- Headquarters: Minsk, Belarus

Programming
- Language(s): Russian, English, Belarusian
- Picture format: 576i (16:9 SDTV)

Ownership
- Owner: National State Television and Radio Company of the Republic of Belarus

History
- Launched: 1 February 2005; 20 years ago
- Former names: Belarus TV (February 1, 2005 — December 31, 2012)

Links
- Website: http://www.belarus24.by

Belarus 24 (Belarusian: Беларусь-24) is the state television and radio channel of Belarus. It was launched on 1 February 2005. It broadcasts primarily in Russian language programmes of other Belarusian state TV channels Belarus 1, Belarus-2, Belarus 3 and Belarus 5.

On 1 January 2013, Belarus TV was renamed Belarus 24.

On 10 June 2021 the channel was banned in Ukraine for allegedly inciting hostility and spreading misinformation about Ukraine.
