= Stsyapan =

Stsyapan, (Note: BGN/PCGN romanization of Belarusian) Stsiapan or Sciapan (Belarusian: Сцяпан, pronounced [sʲt͡sʲaˈpan]) is a Belarusian masculine given name, equivalent to Stephen. Notable people with the name include:

- Stsyapan Kalinkowski (1918–1945), Belarusian sergeant of the Red Army, Hero of the Soviet Union
- Stepan Krasovsky (Stsyapan Krasowski; 1897–1983), Belarusian-born Soviet Air Force marshal
- Ściapan Niekraševič (1883–1937), Belarusian academic, political figure and a victim of Stalin's purges.
- Stsiapan Putsila (born 1998), Belarusian journalist, blogger, film director and TV presenter, founder of Nexta.
- Stsiapan Rahautsou (Born 1983), Belarusian long-distance runner.
- Stsyapan Skarapanaw (1910–1999), Belarusian scientist

== See also ==
- Stepan (given name)
- ,
- ,
