= Buzz (Polish airline) =

Low-cost airline of Poland

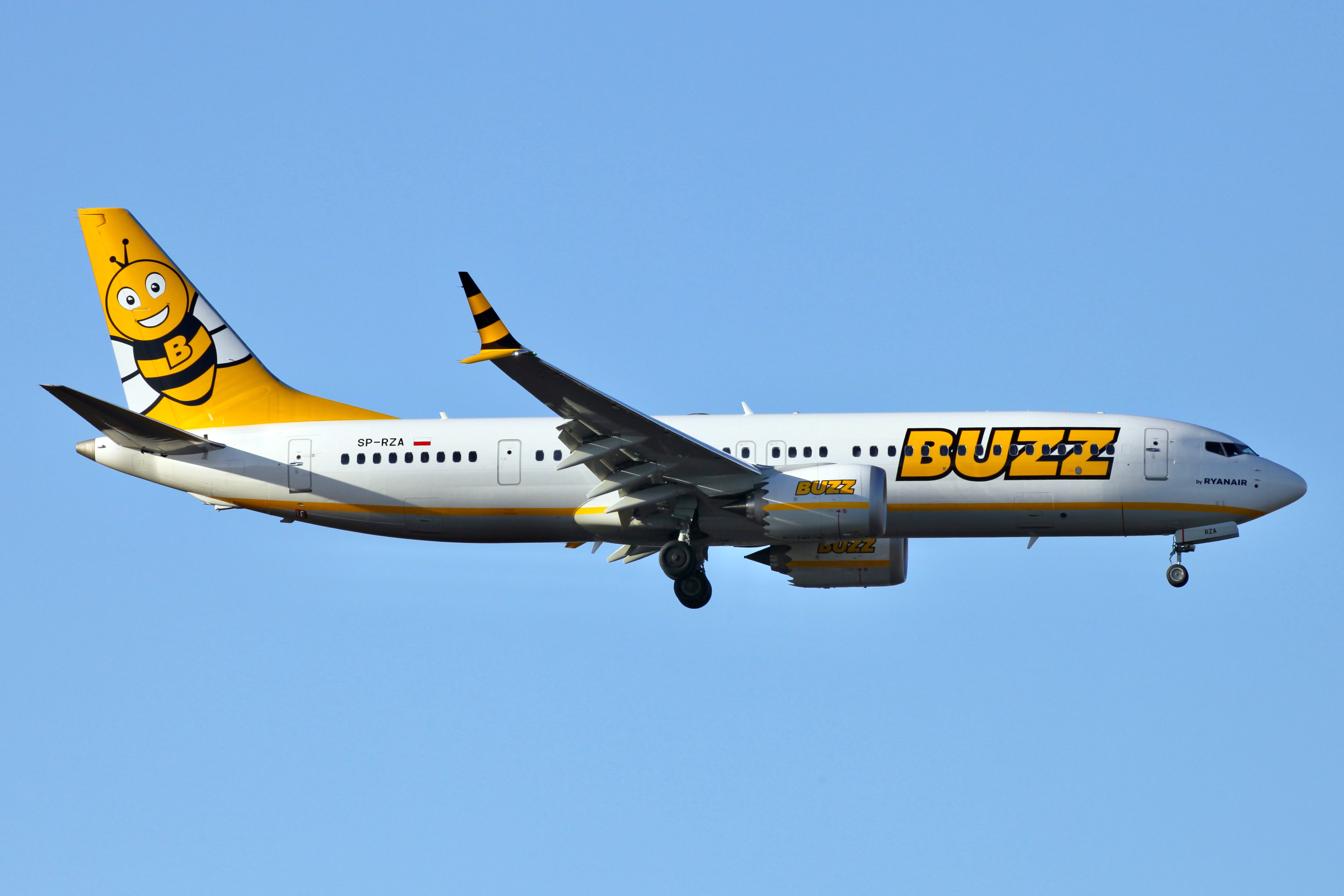
- Buzz Boeing 737 MAX 200 in the airline's own livery
IATA	ICAO	Call sign
RR	RYS	MAGIC SUN
- Founded: 13 July 2017; 9 years ago
- Commenced operations: 23 April 2018; 8 years ago
- Operating bases: Bratislava; Budapest; Gdańsk; Katowice; Kaunas; Kraków; Poznań; Prague; Riga; Sofia; Tirana; Vilnius; Warsaw–Modlin; Wrocław
- Hubs: Warsaw Chopin Airport
- Fleet size: 74
- Parent company: Ryanair Holdings
- Headquarters: Warsaw, Poland
- Key people: Michał Kaczmarzyk (CEO)
- Website: www.buzzair.com

Buzz is a Polish low-cost airline headquartered in Warsaw. A subsidiary of Ryanair Holdings, the airline operates charter and scheduled flights on behalf of Ryanair.

Founded in 2017 as Ryanair Sun, the airline initially operated exclusively as a charter carrier. In March 2019, Ryanair announced that the subsidiary would be rebranded as Buzz, with operations under the new name officially commencing in January 2020.

== History ==
=== Initial operations as charter airline ===
On 3 April 2018, the carrier received an air operator's certificate granted by the Polish Civil Aviation Authority. The first flight took place on 26 April 2018, on the route from Poznań–Ławica Airport to Zakynthos International Airport.

Representatives of the carrier announced that all five aircraft in the Ryanair Sun fleet would receive Polish registration numbers. During summer 2018, Ryanair Sun operated one own Boeing 737-800 registered as SP-RSA. The aircraft was employed on charter flights from Warsaw Chopin Airport.

=== Operations on behalf of Ryanair mainline ===
In September 2018, Ryanair announced the closure of its own Polish bases by 1 January 2019. Operations were to be transferred to Ryanair Sun, meaning Ryanair Sun would operate on behalf of its parent company. In late October 2018, the then-only Ryanair Sun aircraft SP-RSA ceased charter operations out of Warsaw Chopin. The aircraft subsequently replaced Ryanair mainline capacity out of Warsaw Modlin Airport, now operating scheduled services on behalf of its parent company. Starting from November 2018, several former Ryanair-operated Boeing 737 aircraft were moved from the Irish to the Polish registry and now operated by Ryanair Sun on behalf of its parent companies scheduled flights out of Poland.

=== Rebranding to Buzz ===
In March 2019, Ryanair announced that the airline would be rebranded as "Buzz" in autumn 2019. Buzz was formerly the name of a UK budget airline Ryanair bought from KLM in April 2003. Buzz will still operate scheduled and charter flights from its bases in Poland, Czechia, and Bulgaria and aimed to expand its fleet from 17 Boeing 737-800 aircraft to 25 by summer 2019.

== Fleet ==
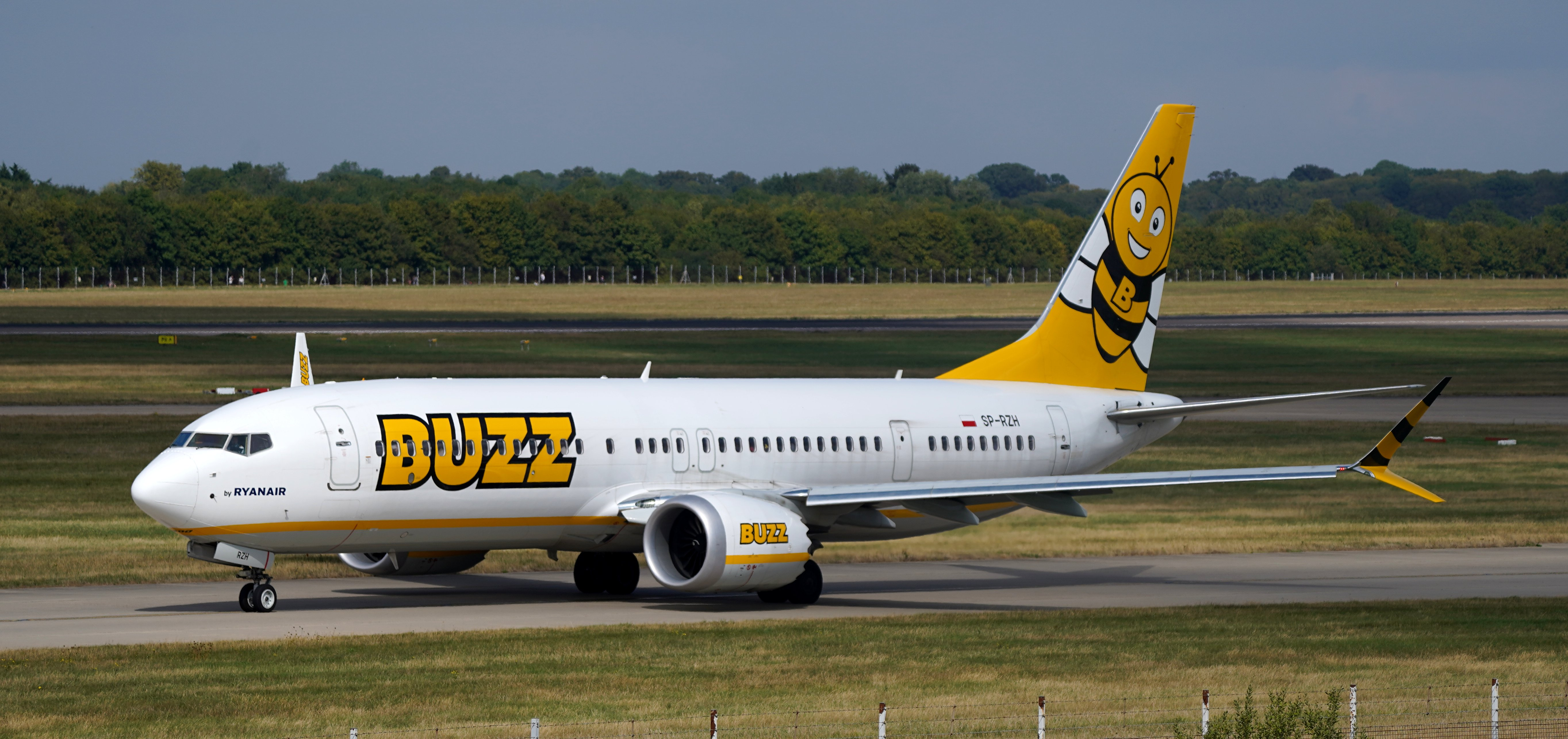
Buzz Boeing 737 MAX 8

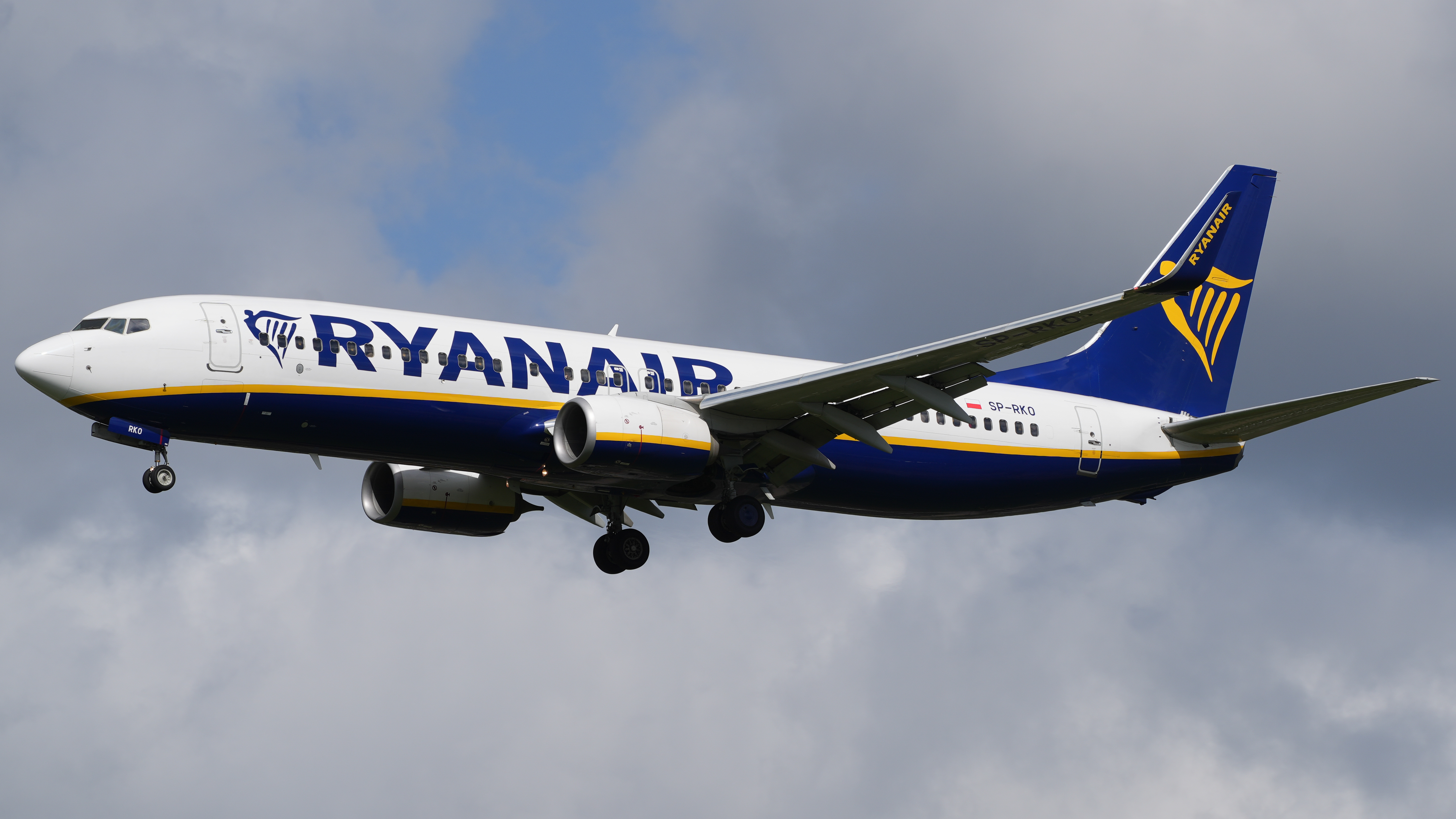
Boeing 737-800 in Ryanair livery

As of September 2025, Buzz operates an all-Boeing 737 fleet composed of the following aircraft:

Buzz fleet
Aircraft	In service	Orders	Passengers
Boeing 737-700	1	—	148
Boeing 737-800	55	—	189
Boeing 737 MAX 8	21	—	197
Total	77	—	

== Accidents and incidents ==
- On 23 May 2021, Ryanair Flight 4978, operated by Buzz, was diverted to Minsk National Airport after a false bomb threat was made while the aircraft was 45 nautical miles (83 km; 52 mi) south of Vilnius and 90 nautical miles (170 km; 100 mi) west of Minsk, but still in Belarusian airspace. According to the airline, its pilots were notified by Belarusian authorities of "a potential security threat on board" and told to land the plane in Minsk. In Minsk, Belarusian journalist and opposition activist Roman Protasevich and his girlfriend were deplaned and arrested. Although the plane was closer to Vilnius, Belarusian president Alexander Lukashenko, according to his press service, personally ordered the flight to be redirected to Minsk and sent Belarusian Air Force MiG-29 fighter aircraft to escort it. Belarusian opposition leader Sviatlana Tsikhanouskaya called for an ICAO investigation of the incident.
