= Sapega =

Sapega is an East Slavic surname, a variant of the surname Sapiega of Lithuanian and Ruthenian origin. Notable people with the surname include:

- Igor Sapega, Swedish chef and entrepreneur
- Yuri Sapega
- Sofia Sapega
