= Tadeusz Giczan =

Belarusian journalist

- Occupation: Journalist

Tadeusz Giczan is a Belarusian journalist. In 2021, he was the Editor-in-chief of the Belarusian opposition media service Nexta.

== Childhood and studies ==
Giczan was raised in Minsk. He obtained his bachelor of arts degree in military studies at Nicolaus Copernicus University and a master's degree in international relations at the University of Warsaw.

As of 2021, Giczan is studying for a PhD at University College London on the topic of the political and economical structures and individuals that support and benefit from the Government of Belarus.

== Media and academic career ==
As a journalist of the Belarusian opposition media service Nexta, Giczan became Editor-in-chief after Roman Protasevich shifted to a different opposition media service in January 2021. Giczan stated that since the 2020 Belarusian presidential election and the 2020–2021 Belarusian protests, he and other Nexta staff became used to receiving "dozens" of death threats daily.

As of 2021, Giczan holds the status of non-resident fellow at the Center for European Policy Analysis.

== See also ==
- Belarusian democracy movement
