= Evo Morales grounding incident =

2013 aviation incident in Europe

On 1 July 2013, president Evo Morales of Bolivia, who had been attending a conference of gas-exporting countries in Russia, gave an interview to the RT television network in which he appeared predisposed to offer asylum to Edward Snowden. The day after his TV interview, Morales's Dassault Falcon 900 FAB-001, carrying him back to La Paz from Moscow, took off from Vnukovo Airport, flew uninterrupted over Poland and the Czech Republic, but then unexpectedly landed in Vienna, Austria.

According to Bolivia, the flight was rerouted to Austria when France, Spain and Italy denied access to their airspace, allegedly due to suspicions that Snowden was on board.

== Forced landing ==
Spain, France, and Italy (red) denied Bolivian president Evo Morales permission to cross their airspace. Morales's plane landed in Austria (yellow).

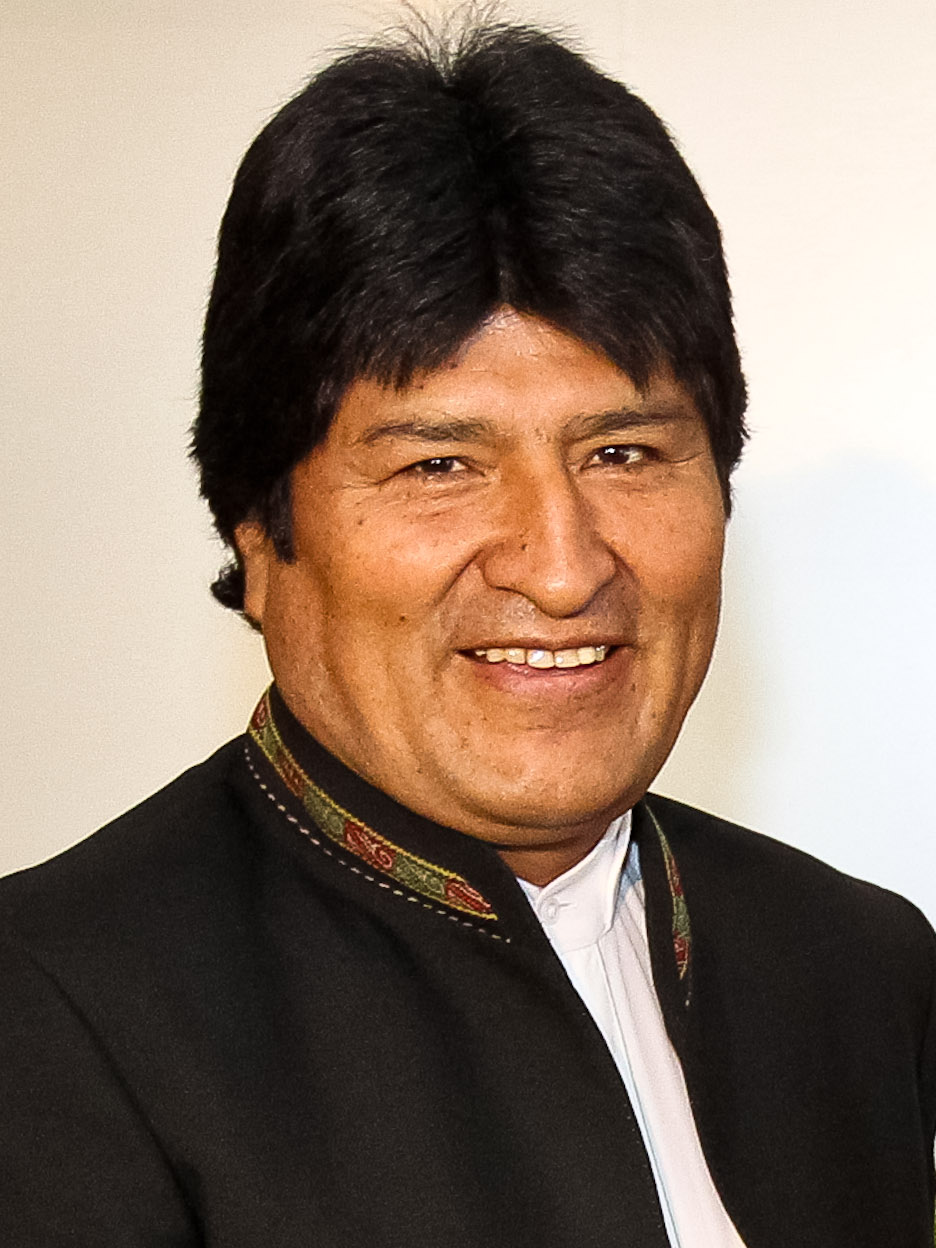
President of Bolivia Evo Morales in 2011

According to Austrian statements, the pilots requested emergency landing due to issues with fuel level indicators causing inability to confirm there was sufficient fuel to continue flight. Austria's deputy chancellor, Michael Spindelegger, said that the plane was searched, although the Bolivian Defense Minister denied a search took place, saying Morales had denied entry to his plane. The refusals for entry into French, Spanish, and Italian airspace ostensibly for "technical reasons", strongly denounced by Bolivia, Ecuador, and other South American nations, were attributed to rumors disseminated by the US that Snowden was on board. Spanish Minister of Foreign Affairs, José García-Margallo, publicly stated that they were told he was on board but did not specify as to who had informed them.

The President of Austria, Heinz Fischer, later clarified that an airport officer did board the aircraft to find out why it had landed in Vienna reporting technical problems, but "there was no formal inspection". The following morning, President Fischer went to greet President Morales in his plane and shared breakfast with him.

Fourteen hours later, after officials worked to resolve the dispute, the aircraft took off again for the Canary Islands passing over France, Spain, Portugal and Italy.

== Aftermath ==
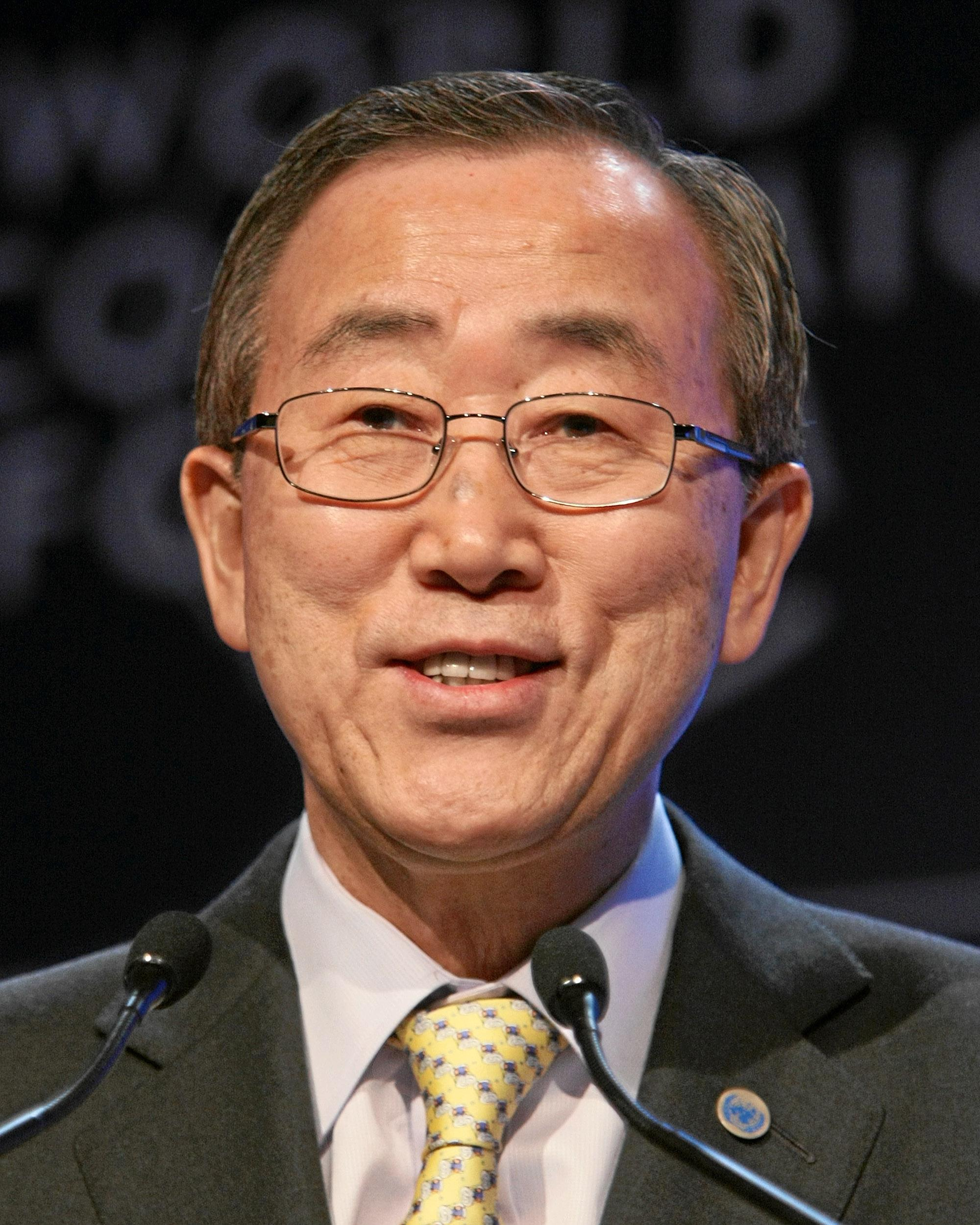
U.N. Secretary-General Ban Ki-moon asserted that "a head of state and his or her aircraft enjoy immunity and inviolability"

France apologized for the incident immediately. The Spanish ambassador to Bolivia apologized two weeks later, citing inappropriate procedures. The Italians and Portuguese sent official explanations to the Bolivian Government.

On 3 July, Jen Psaki, spokesperson for the U.S. Department of State, acknowledged that the U.S. had been "in contact with a range of countries across the world who had any chance of having Mr. Snowden land or even transit through their countries".

On 20 September, President Morales announced a lawsuit against the U.S. government for "crimes against humanity" for repeatedly blocking presidential flights, after an incident in which authorization for an overflight of Puerto Rico by President Maduro of Venezuela was delayed. U.S. authorities said that they were entitled to three days' advance notice. Maduro had been en route to arrive in Beijing for bilateral talks with the People's Republic of China.

In the aftermath of the incident, seven Latin American countries – Bolivia, Argentina, Cuba, Ecuador, Nicaragua, Uruguay, and Venezuela – voiced their concerns to UN Secretary-General Ban Ki-moon, who stated that "a Head of State and his or her aircraft enjoy immunity and inviolability". Ban also emphasized that it is important to prevent such incidents from occurring in the future.

== Julian Assange's statement ==
In April 2015, Wikileaks founder Julian Assange claimed to having deliberately leaked the false information about Snowden being on the plane to the U.S. as part of several "special measures" to distract secret services. In response, the Bolivian ambassador to Russia demanded that Assange apologize for putting their president's life at risk. Interviewed in August 2015 by the Bolivian newspaper El Deber, Assange stated that Wikileaks and the government of Venezuela discussed smuggling Snowden out of Russia aboard the presidential plane of either Venezuela or Bolivia. Assange did not know whether or not the Bolivian government was aware of these negotiations, and did not himself communicate with the Bolivians, but said that Venezuela should have warned Bolivia. He also stated that he regretted what happened but that "[w]e can’t predict that other countries engage in some ... unprecedented criminal operation".

Assange said the grounding of Morales's plane "reveals the true nature of the relationship between Western Europe and the United States" as "a phone call from U.S. intelligence was enough to close the airspace to a booked presidential flight, which has immunity".

== See also ==
- Bolivia–Spain relations
- Bolivia–United States relations
- Foreign policy of Evo Morales
- French hijacking of Moroccan plane, 1956
- Ryanair Flight 4978
- Edward Snowden § Flight from the United States
