= Bolivia–Spain relations =

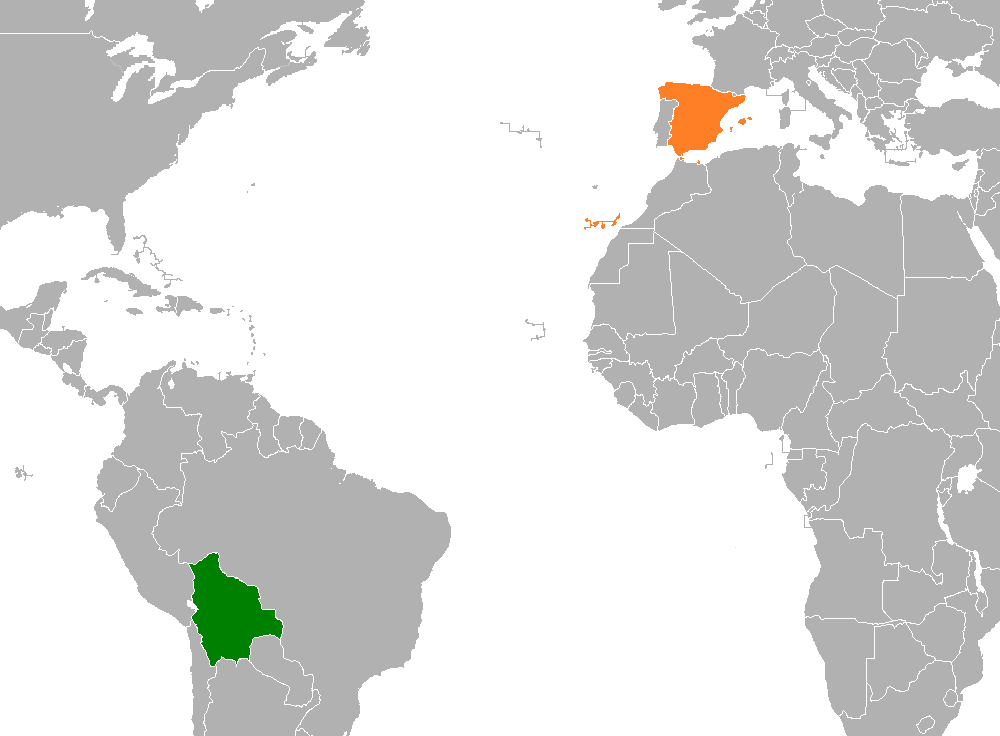
- Bolivia: Spain

Diplomatic mission
- Embassy of Bolivia, Madrid: Embassy of Spain, La Paz

Bolivia–Spain relations are the current and historical relations between Bolivia and Spain. Both nations are members of the Association of Spanish Language Academies, Organization of Ibero-American States and the United Nations.

== History ==
=== Spanish colonization ===
Bolivia and Spain share a long history since the arrival of the first Spanish conquistadores led by Francisco Pizarro in 1532. By 1534, Pizarro managed to overcome the Incan Empire (which was in present-day Bolivia, Peru, Chile and Ecuador) and claimed the territory for Spain. In 1542, the Viceroyalty of Peru was created and the territory of Bolivia (known at the time as Upper Peru) was governed from its capital in Lima but administered locally by the Real Audiencia of Charcas in present-day Sucre.

In 1545, Spain founded the city of Potosí, next to Cerro Rico which provided vast quantities of silver for the Spanish Empire and was worked by the local Indigenous people. In 1776, Upper Peru was governed by the newly created Viceroyalty of the Río de la Plata with its capital in Buenos Aires. In the early 1780s, local indigenous people from the highlands took part in widespread uprisings, most notably the revolt of Rebellion of Túpac Amaru II. The rebels hoped to restore the Inca Empire, however, the revolts were defeated by Spanish forces.

=== Independence ===
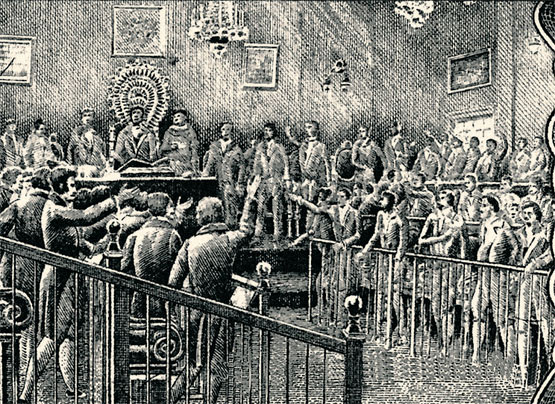
Declaration of Bolivian Independence

By 1809, the idea of independence spread through Upper Peru as in several other nations throughout Spanish America. In May 1810, a revolution occurred in Buenos Aires which controlled the territory of Upper Peru and led to the Argentine War of Independence led by General José de San Martín. This led to the creation of a guerrilla warfare in 1811 in Upper Peru known as the War of the Republiquetas. The guerrilla fighters were eventually defeated by royalist forces.

In 1822, troops belonging to Simón Bolívar, José de San Martín and Antonio José de Sucre entered Peru and defeated the Spanish forces in the country. Soon afterwards, troops led by Antonio José de Sucre entered Upper Peru and fought against royalist forces. By 1825, Upper Peru was free from Spanish authority. Originally, Bolívar wanted Upper Peru to join either Peru or Argentina, however, the people of Upper Peru convinced Bolívar and Sucre to give autonomy to the territory and on 6 August 1825, an Upper Peruvian congress declared the country independent and renamed the territory "Bolivia" in honor of Simón Bolívar and named its capital "Sucre" in honor of Antonio José de Sucre.

=== Post independence ===
In July 1847, Bolivia and Spain signed a Treaty of Peace and Friendship thus establishing diplomatic relations between both nations. In 1866, Bolivia declared war against Spain during the Chincha Islands War which also involved Peru, Chile and Ecuador.

During the Spanish Civil War, Bolivian diplomatic missions in Spain offered asylum to over 300 Spanish citizens and issued visas and safe conduct documents to Spanish nationals to flee to France or to Bolivia. Bolivia maintained diplomatic relations with Spain throughout General Francisco Franco's administration. In the early 1950s, Antonio García Barón, a member of the Durruti Column and survivor of Mauthausen-Gusen concentration camp arrived to Bolivia where he moved to the Bolivian jungle and set up an anarchist community.

In May 1987, Spanish King Juan Carlos I paid his first official visit to Bolivia, his first of three visits to the country. In 2006, Evo Morales became President of Bolivia. Relations between both nations have been minimal during the President Morales administration. In May 2012, President Morales nationalized Spanish company Red Eléctrica de España, an electrical grid company operating in Bolivia and in December 2012, President Morales also nationalized Spanish electrical company Iberdrola. In February 2013, President Morales nationalized the Spanish infrastructure company, Abertis which led to heightened diplomatic tension between Bolivia and Spain.

In July 2013, on his way back to Bolivia from a visit in Russia, President Morales' plane was forced to land in Austria after WikiLeaks founder Julian Assange leaked false information that whistleblower Edward Snowden was on board President Morales' airplane to Bolivia. Spain, France and Italy had denied for President Morales to fly in their airspace, which was why the President's airplane was forced to land in Austria. After a thorough search of the plane, it was concluded that Edward Snowden was not on board.

=== 2019 Bolivian political crisis ===
During the 2019 Bolivian general election, the Organization of American States conducted an audit that found "clear manipulation" in the election and significant irregularities overseen by the Electoral Commission. Following protests, President Morales agreed to hold fresh elections on 10 November 2019; however, soon afterwards President Morales and his vice president, Álvaro García Linera, resigned from office after losing support from the police and military. Both men boarded a Mexican Air Force and were granted asylum in Mexico. Soon afterwards, the Mexican embassy in La Paz opened its ambassador's residence to various former associates of Evo Morales, and this has led to protests from angry Bolivians who oppose the ex-president. In December 2019, two Spanish diplomats paid a courtesy visit to the Mexican Ambassador's residence. The interim Bolivian government viewed the visit as an insult and accused the diplomats of having ulterior "hostile" motives. On 30 December, Bolivia expelled the two Spanish diplomats from the country, along with the Mexican Ambassador. That same day, the Spanish government of Prime Minister Pedro Sánchez reciprocated the move by expelling two Bolivian diplomats from Spain.

== High-level visits ==
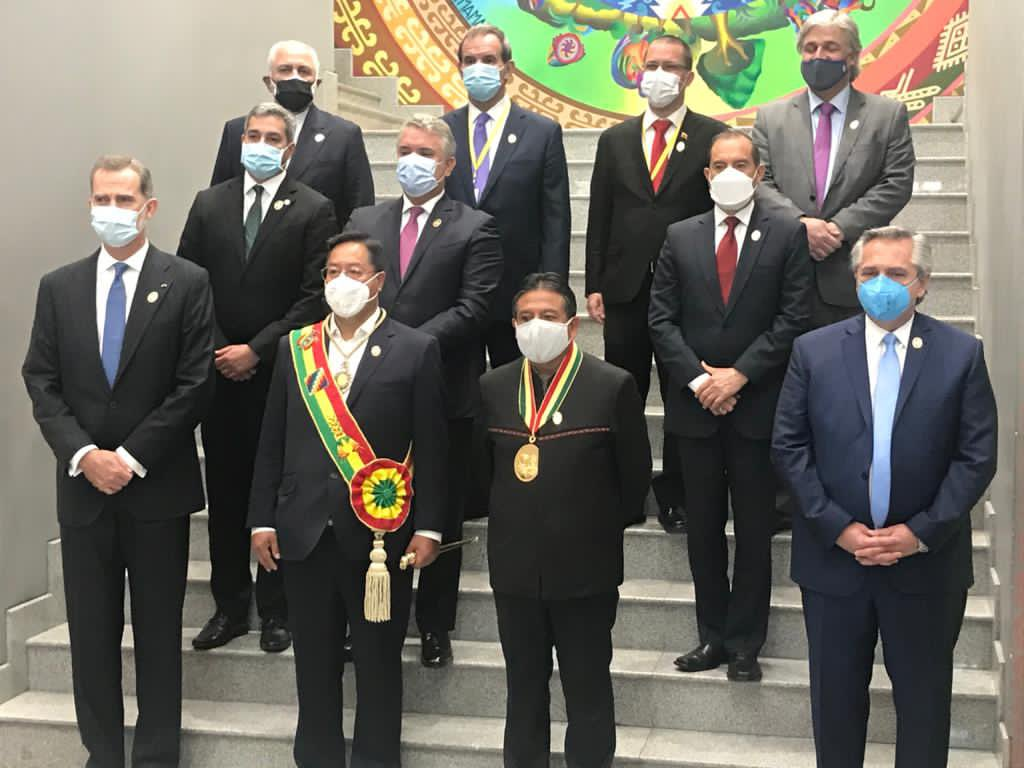
Bolivian President Luis Arce and Spanish King Felipe VI (among other leaders) in La Paz, 2020.

Presidential visits from Bolivia to Spain

- President Hernán Siles Zuazo (1983)
- President Jaime Paz Zamora (1992, 1993)
- President Jorge Quiroga (2001)
- President Gonzalo Sánchez de Lozada (2003)
- President Eduardo Rodríguez Veltzé (2005)
- President Evo Morales (2009, 2012, 2013)
- President Rodrigo Paz (2026)

Royal and Prime Ministerial visits from Spain to Bolivia

- King Juan Carlos I (1987, 2000, 2003)
- Prime Minister José María Aznar (1998, 2003)
- Crowned Prince Felipe (1991, 2002, 2006, 2010)
- King Felipe VI (2020, 2026)
- Prime Minister Pedro Sánchez (2018)

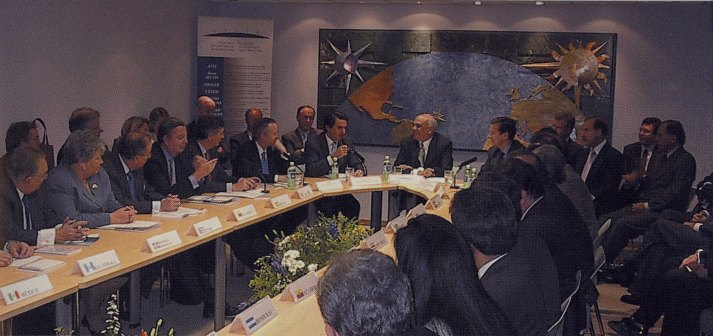
Prime Minister José María Aznar and President Jorge Quiroga in Madrid, 2001.

== Bilateral relations ==
Over the years, both nations have signed numerous agreements such as an Agreement on the Recognition of Academic Degrees (1903); Agreement on Dual-Citizenship (1961); Cultural Agreement (1966); Technical Cooperation (1971); Extradition Treaty (1990); Agreement on the Avoidance of Double-Taxation (1997); Agreement on Adoptions (2001); Agreement on the Promotion and Protection of Investments (2001) and an Air Transportation Agreement (2010).

== Migration ==
In 2011, approximately 250,000 Bolivian citizens resided in Spain. Most Bolivians left their country of origin to Spain to escape poverty and political instability. In 2011, Bolivian nationals in Spain sent over US$1 billion in remittances to Bolivia. In 2014, there were approximately 10,000 Spanish citizens residing in Bolivia.

== Transportation ==
There are direct flights between Bolivia and Spain through the following airlines: Air Europa and Boliviana de Aviación.

== Trade ==
In 2024, trade between Bolivia and Spain totaled €209 million Euros. Spanish multinational companies such as Mapfre and Repsol operate in Bolivia.

== Resident diplomatic missions ==
of Bolivia in Spain

- Madrid (Embassy)
- Madrid (Consulate-General)
- Barcelona (Consulate-General)
- Bilbao (Consulate)
- Murcia (Consulate)
- Seville (Consulate)
- Valencia (Consulate)
- Granada (Vice-Consulate)
- Palma (Vice-Consulate)

of Spain in Bolivia

- La Paz (Embassy)
- Santa Cruz de la Sierra (Consulate-General)

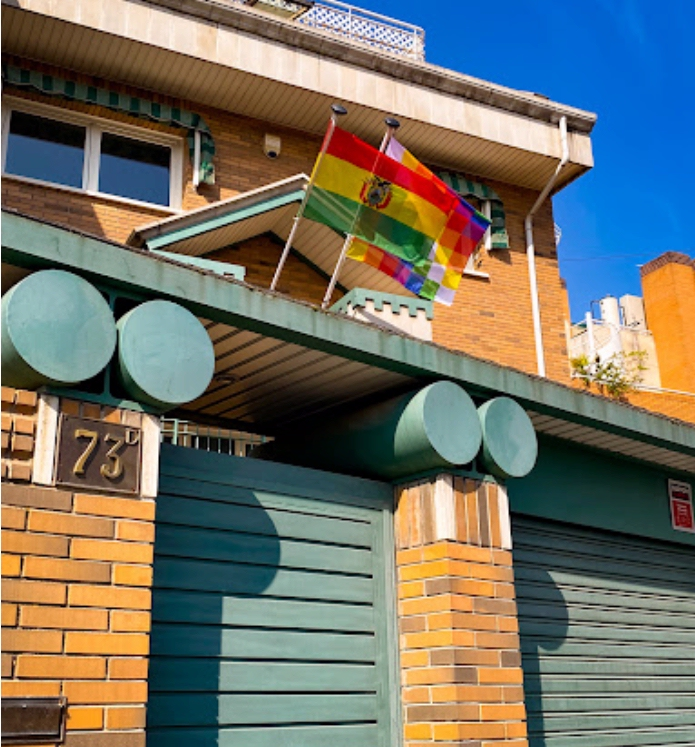
Embassy of Bolivia in Madrid

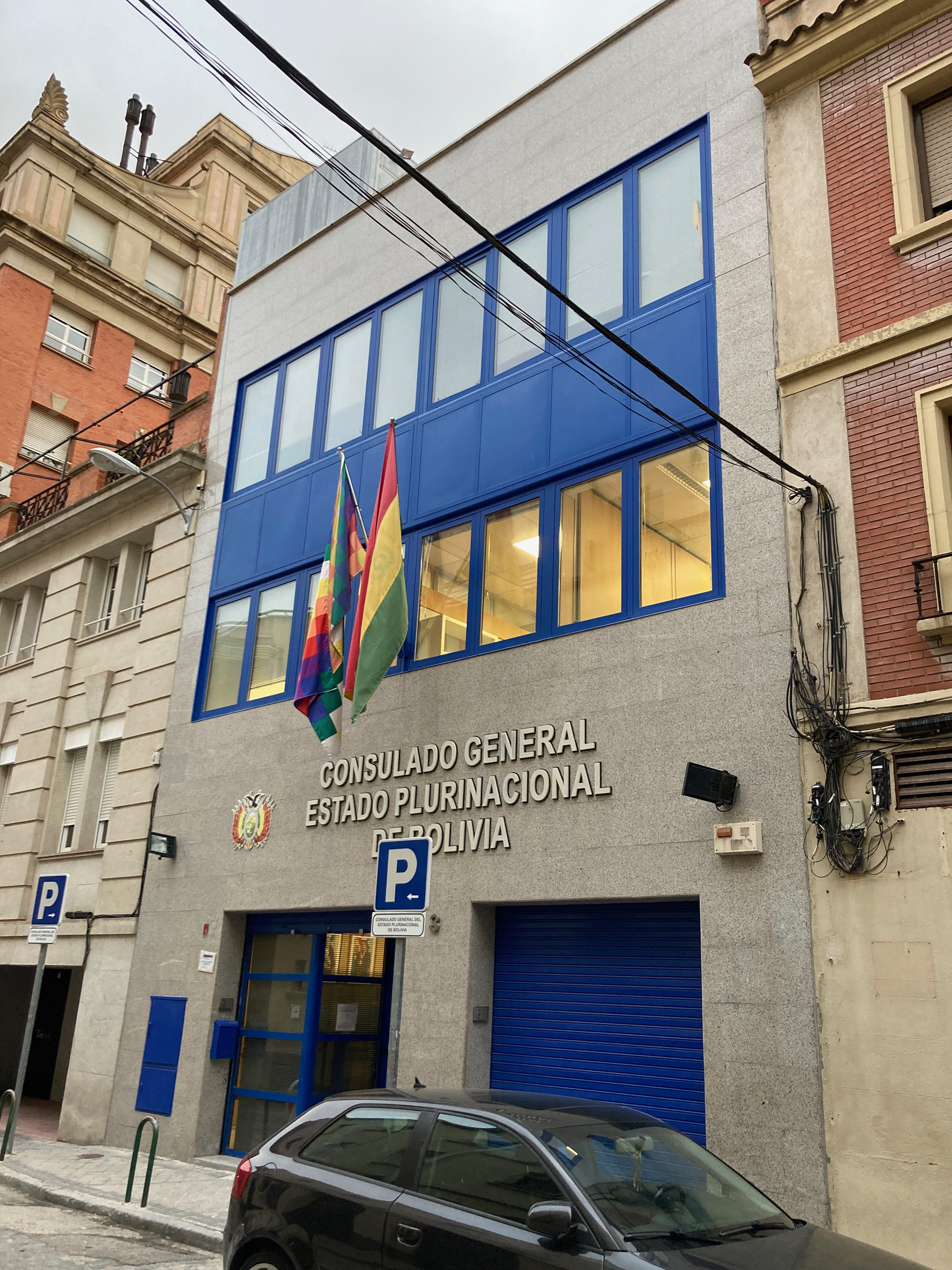
Consulate-general of Bolivia in Madrid

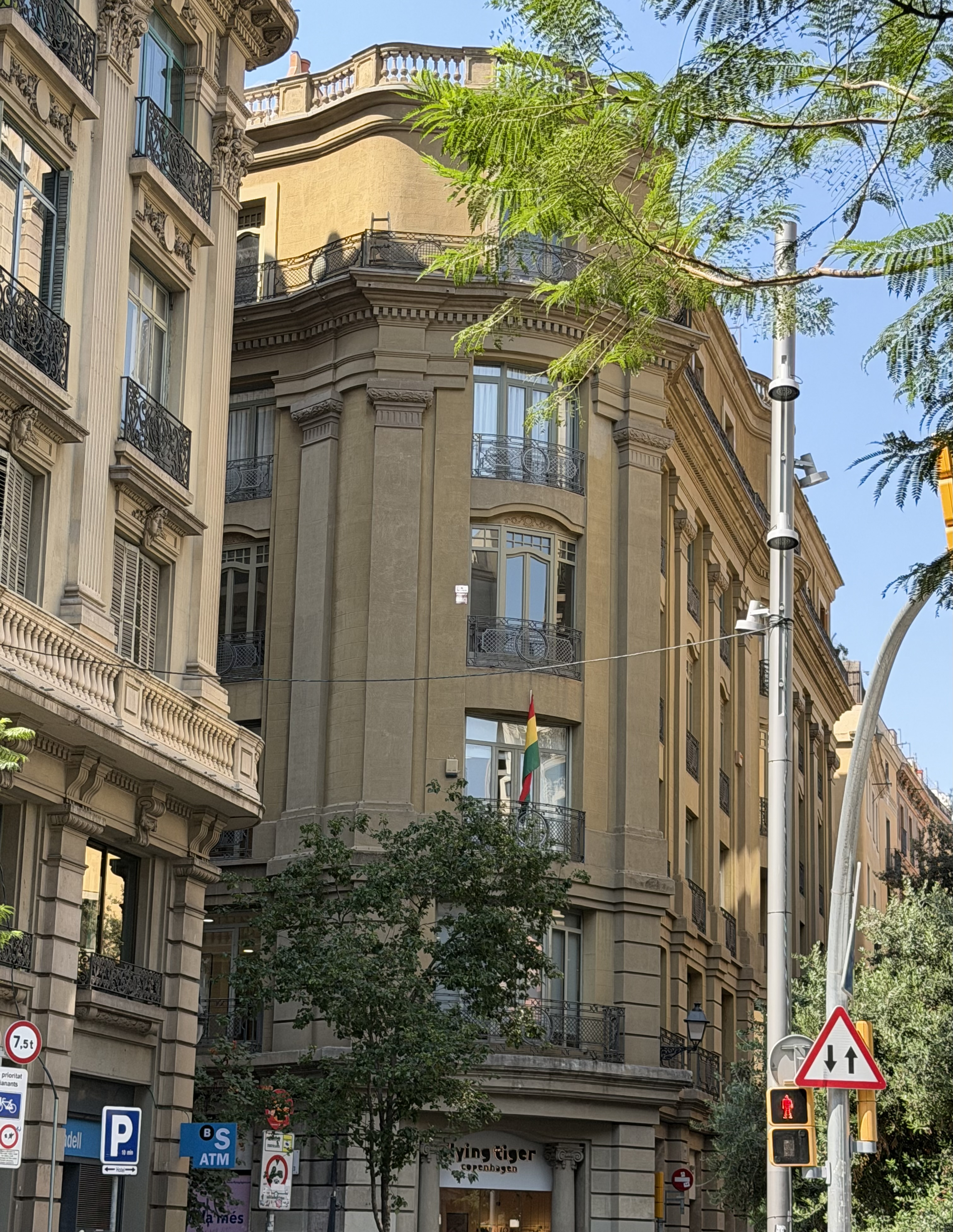
Consulate-General of Bolivia in Barcelona

== See also ==
- Immigration to Bolivia
- Immigration to Spain
- Evo Morales grounding incident
