= Ryanair Flight 4978 =

2021 aviation incident in Belarus

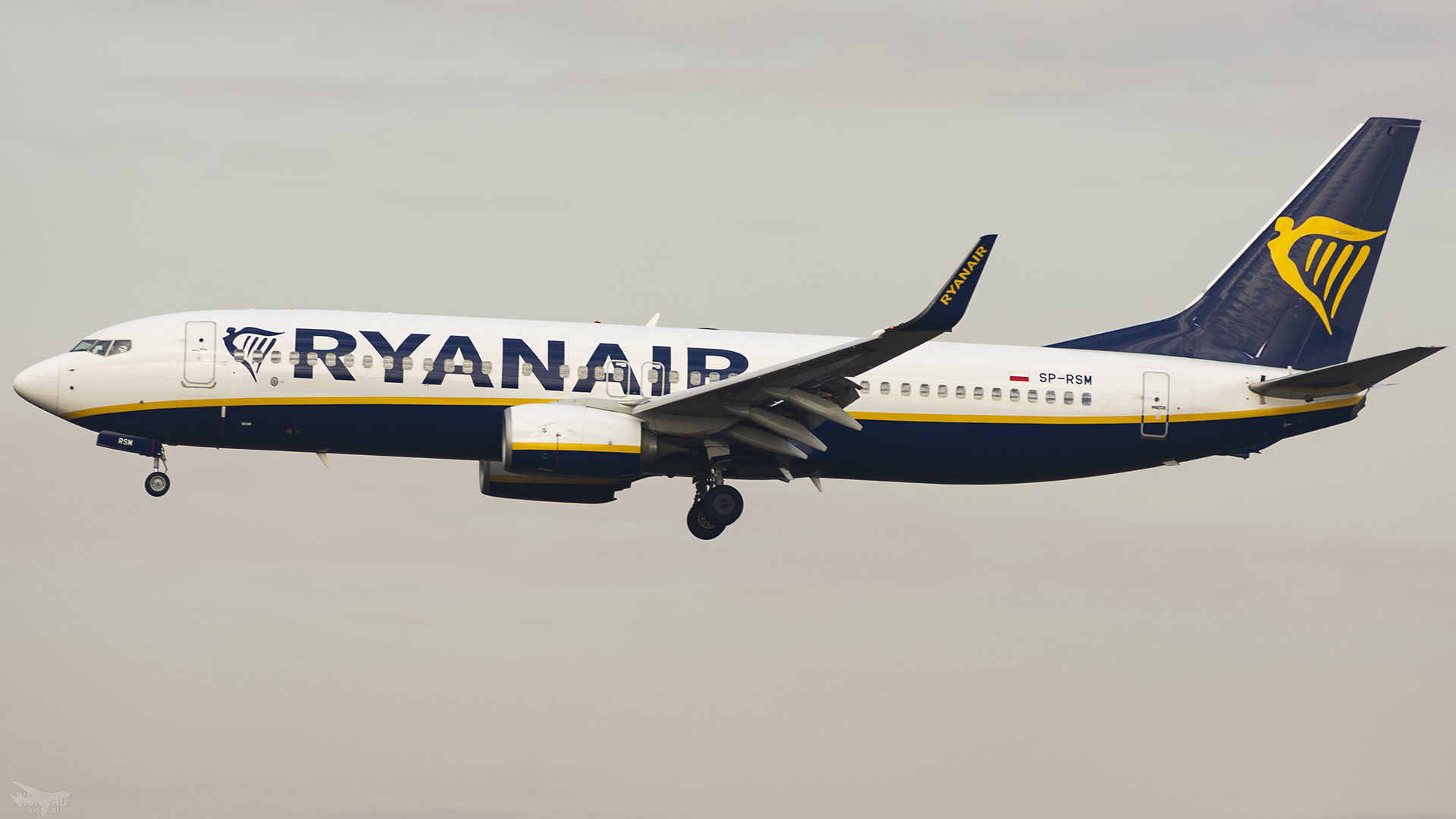
- SP-RSM, the aircraft involved, in January 2021

Incident
- Date: 23 May 2021
- Summary: Forced landing and arrest of two passengers
- Site: Minsk National Airport

Aircraft
- Aircraft type: Boeing 737-8AS (Note: The aircraft was a Boeing 737-800 model; Boeing assigns a unique code for each company that buys one of its aircraft, which is applied as an infix to the model number at the time the aircraft is built, hence "737-8AS" designates a 737-800 built for Ryanair (customer code AS).)
- Operator: Buzz on behalf of Ryanair
- IATA flight No.: FR4978
- ICAO flight No.: RYR1TZ
- Call sign: RYANAIR 1 TANGO ZULU
- Registration: SP-RSM
- Flight origin: Athens International Airport
- Destination: Vilnius Airport
- Occupants: 132
- Passengers: 126
- Crew: 6
- Fatalities: 0
- Survivors: 132

Ryanair Flight 4978 was a regularly scheduled international passenger flight from Athens International Airport, Greece, to Vilnius Airport, Lithuania, operated by a Boeing 737-800 owned by Buzz, a Polish subsidiary of the Irish airline Ryanair. On 23 May 2021, while in Belarusian airspace, it was diverted by the Belarusian government to Minsk National Airport due to alleged claims of a Hamas bombing attempt, where two of its passengers, opposition activist and journalist Roman Protasevich and his then girlfriend Sofia Sapega, were arrested by authorities. The aircraft was allowed to depart after seven hours, reaching Vilnius eight and a half hours behind schedule.

The act was condemned by the European Union (EU), NATO, Canada, the United Kingdom, and the United States, among others, and by some civil aviation authorities, while Russian officials backed Belarus. The EU and the European Union Aviation Safety Agency issued directives halting European airlines from flying over Belarusian airspace. The incident led to the eventual closing of the Embassy of Belarus in Canada.

== Aircraft ==
The aircraft involved was a four-year-old Boeing 737-800, registered in Poland, registration SP-RSM. The aircraft entered service with Ryanair in May 2017, registered EI-FZX in Ireland, and in November 2019, it was transferred to Ryanair Sun (now Buzz) as SP-RSM on the Polish aircraft registry.

== Incident ==
Approximate route of the flight, showing its diversion toward Minsk

On 23 May 2021, Ryanair Flight 4978 (Athens–Vilnius), operated by the Polish subsidiary Buzz, a Boeing 737-800 carrying six crew members and 126 passengers, was diverted to Minsk National Airport after ground authorities reported a bomb on board, whilst the aircraft was 45 nautical miles (83 km; 52 mi) south of Vilnius and 90 nautical miles (170 km; 100 mi) west of Minsk, but still in Belarusian airspace.

The Department of Aviation of Belarus claimed that an email was received in the generic mailbox info@airport.by containing the following text at 09:25 UTC (12:25 local):

We, Hamas soldiers, demand that Israel cease fire in the Gaza Strip. We demand that the European Union abandon its support for Israel in this war. We know that the participants of Delphi Economic Forum are returning home on May 23 via flight FR4978. A bomb was planted onto this aircraft. If you don't meet our demands the bomb will explode on May 23 over Vilnius. Allahu Akbar.

The information later obtained from the email server by the Fact-Finding Investigation Team of the International Civil Aviation Organization showed that such an email had been sent to Minsk Airport at 09:56 (12:56 local).

This message was sent to a total of six recipients in separate emails to the airports of Vilnius, Athens, Sofia, Bucharest, Kyiv and Minsk, with the first five sent while FR4978 was flying over Ukrainian airspace, immediately prior to entering Belarusian airspace.

According to the airline, its pilots were notified by Belarusian authorities of "a potential security threat on board" and were instructed to land the aircraft in Minsk. The aircraft had entered Belarusian airspace at 12:30, and the "bomb threat" was passed on by Belarusian air traffic control (ATC) immediately afterwards. At 12:33, air traffic control mentioned an e-mail from terrorists sent to the Minsk airport.

According to Ryanair CEO Michael O'Leary, the pilots were told by Belarusian ATC that there was a bomb on board which would be detonated if the aircraft entered Lithuanian airspace, hence the need to divert to Minsk. O'Leary said that the pilots tried to seek advice from Ryanair but were lied to by Belarusian ATC, who told them company representatives were not answering the phone.

According to his press service, Belarusian president Alexander Lukashenko personally ordered that the flight be redirected to Minsk with a Belarusian Air Force MiG-29 fighter escort. However, the ICAO fact-finding task force later determined the MiG-29 was tasked with communications back-up and to protect Minsk, and did not approach nor escort FR4978. The Belarusian government news agency BelTA said that the pilots had asked to land in Minsk. Both Ryanair and Belarusian law enforcement said that no bombs were found on board.

The flight course of FR4978 over Belarus became unusual even before making the U-turn. Based on Flightradar24 raw data, it was noted that the aircraft did not start to descend over Belarus, even though this is usually done in preparation for landing in Vilnius.

== Passengers ==
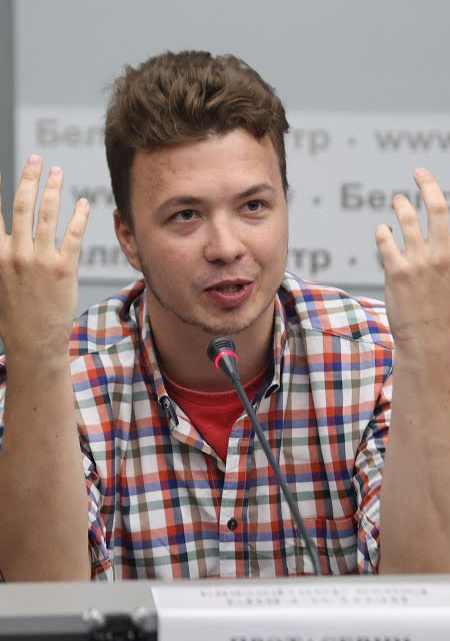
Roman Protasevich, the journalist and activist, was arrested after the forced landing in Minsk.

Upon landing in Minsk, the Belarusian opposition activist Roman Protasevich was removed from the aircraft and arrested on the grounds that he was listed on a Belarusian wanted list. His girlfriend at the time, Sofia Sapega, a Russian citizen, was also removed and detained without explanation. The European Humanities University in Vilnius confirmed she was detained and demanded her release. Sapega faced three criminal charges "each of which carry sentences of between three and 15 years in prison" and was subsequently sentenced to six years in prison for "inciting social enmity and discord" and "illegally collecting and disseminating information about the private life of an unnamed person without his consent".

Belarusian opposition leader Sviatlana Tsikhanouskaya called for an investigation of the incident by the International Civil Aviation Organization (ICAO). Belarus had placed Protasevich on a list of "individuals involved in terrorist activity" the previous year for his role in anti-government protests. Opposition leader Pavel Latushko claimed that Belarusian ATC threatened to shoot down the passenger plane if it did not make an emergency landing in Minsk. According to some passengers, Protasevich asked the cabin crew for refuge, but was refused because of Ryanair legal agreements. As he left the aircraft, Protasevich independently told another passenger that "the death penalty awaits me here". Another source said that Protasevich faced 15 years' imprisonment for his support of "terrorist groups" in Belarus.

According to sources close to Tsikhanouskaya, Protasevich noticed that he was under surveillance at the Athens airport. In his messages, he said that a man next to him at the line and the checkpoint tried to take photos of his travel documents. Additionally, Tadeusz Giczan, a member of the Nexta Telegram channel, which was previously edited by Protasevich, said that officers of the KGB had been on the flight and had "initiated a fight with the Ryanair crew", insisting that there was a bomb on board the aircraft. Lina Beišinė, spokeswoman for the Lithuanian Airports state enterprise, told AFP that Minsk National Airport had said the flight was diverted "due to a conflict between a member of the crew and the passengers".

In addition to Roman Protasevich and Sofia Sapega, three passengers disembarked in Minsk, including two Belarusians and one Greek citizen. Following speculation that the passengers were members of the Belarusian KGB, Belarusian state television aired a video of three people saying that they had chosen to stay in Minsk; one was a Greek man, who said he was travelling to Minsk anyway and would have otherwise taken a connecting flight from Vilnius to Minsk. A Greek government official stated that an investigation had not indicated a connection between the Greek national and the incident. The other two passengers also said that they wanted to disembark in Minsk.

The aircraft was allowed to depart after 7 hours on the ground in Minsk, reaching Vilnius 8.5 hours late. Passengers noted having to wait 2.5 hours without water, toilet breaks or phone calls, while 50 to 60 Belarusian security officers at Minsk airport carried out a search that included checking the belly of the aircraft for bombs.

== Aftermath ==
=== Belarusian government ===
Following the incident, the Belarusian Ministry of Transport announced that it had set up a commission to investigate the forced landing, stating that it would notify the ICAO and IATA about the investigation's progress and publish a report shortly thereafter.

On 24 May 2021, the director of the Department of Aviation of the Ministry of Transport of Belarus, Artyom Sikorsky, read out an e-mail letter, which they said was sent to Minsk airport on 23 May. This message, signed by "Hamas soldiers", included demands to Israel to "cease fire in the Gaza Strip" and for the European Union to end its support of Israel. If the demands were not met, the Ryanair aircraft would be blown up over Vilnius, according to the e-mail. Chancellor of Germany Angela Merkel called the Belarusian explanation "completely implausible". Hamas denied that it was in any way connected to the incident. Journalists discovered that the e-mail published by Belarusian authorities had been received at 12:57, 24 minutes after Belarusian air traffic control notified the Ryanair flight of the bomb threat.

On 25 May 2021, the Belarusian Department of Aviation published its transcription of radio communications between Belarusian air traffic control and the FR4978 pilots. According to the transcript, the Belarusian flight operator originally told the pilots that they "have information from special services" about the bomb on board, later claiming that the "airport security stuff [sic] informed they received e-mail". When the pilot asked whether it was Vilnius airport that received the e-mail, or Athens, the flight operator said that the bombing alert was received by "several airports". When the pilot asked whose recommendation it had been to land in Minsk, he was informed by the flight operator that it was "our recommendations". The transcript indicated that the pilot initially decided to circle at his present position, then later decided to divert to Minsk airport on the recommendation. As of 25 May 2021, this transcript could not be confirmed by independent parties. According to The Wall Street Journal, Ryanair CEO Michael O'Leary rejected the version of events presented by Belarusian government officials and called the situation a "premeditated hijacking".

On 26 May 2021, Lukashenko made his first public remarks about the incident in a speech to the Belarusian parliament. He said that he acted "legally" and claimed that "ill-wishers from outside the country and from inside the country changed their methods of attack on the state", referring to it as "hybrid war". He also accused Protasevich of planning a "bloody rebellion", without giving details. Lukashenko added that the bomb threat had come from Switzerland; however, the Swiss government said it had no knowledge of any bomb threat on the flight.

=== EU economic sanctions ===
The Lithuanian cabinet banned all flights to and from Lithuania flying through Belarusian airspace, effective 00:00 GMT, 25 May (03:00 EEST). British transport secretary Grant Shapps instructed the Civil Aviation Authority to request that British airlines avoid Belarusian airspace. Belavia had been flying into Gatwick Airport prior to the incident. Ukrainian president Volodymyr Zelenskyy instructed the government to halt air traffic with Belarus.

The EU held a meeting of leaders on 24 May 2021 in Brussels, Belgium. Before the meeting, Lithuanian President Gitanas Nausėda called for the EU to impose fresh economic sanctions on Belarus. Calls were made by eight countries for flights over and to Belarus to be banned. Another suggestion was that ground traffic be banned from entering the EU from Belarus. At the meeting, it was agreed upon to prohibit EU-based airlines from flying through Belarusian airspace, ban Belarusian carriers from flying into EU airspace, and to implement a fresh round of sanctions.

On 26 May 2021, the European Union and the EU Aviation Safety Agency issued directives formally halting European airlines from flying over Belarusian airspace. The U.S. and the EU announced plans to impose punitive sanctions targeting key members of Lukashenko's government. In early June, Germany briefly stopped issuing flight permits to airlines from Russia for flights to Germany, after two Lufthansa flights were not issued permits to fly into Russia.

On 4 June 2021, the European Union banned Belarusian airlines from its airspace along with other economic sanctions. On 9 June 2021, the United States government announced it would implement new sanctions on Belarus. The United States, European Union, United Kingdom and Canada issued a joint statement on 21 June 2021 announcing further sanctions against members and supporters of the Belarusian government, as well as Belarusian state-owned companies. These included individual travel bans, asset freezes and other sanctions. Further measures taken were EU dual-use goods and technology export bans to Belarus, as well as trade bans on petroleum products, potassium chloride for the Belarusian potash industry, and goods used for the production of tobacco products.

Following the EU sanctions, Belarus was accused by the EU states of instigating the Belarus–European Union border crisis.

In early November 2021, the head of the Department of Aviation at the Belarusian Ministry of Transport and Communications Artem Sikorsky said that the EU sanctions cost the country about $10 million (~$11.7 million in 2025) in lost opportunities every month. Sikorsky called on Russia and other Eurasian Union members to respond collectively to "aviation extremism" from Western countries and to accelerate the creation of a unified aviation administration of all Eurasian countries. During the same press conference he recalled the intention to challenge the EU sanctions in international courts.

Belaeronavigatsia, the Belarusian state-owned enterprise responsible for regulating airspace and providing air traffic control in Belarus, was sanctioned by the EU. It lost its case against those sanctions in the General Court of the EU on 15 February 2023.

=== International Civil Aviation Organization ===
On 27 May 2021, the ICAO Council expressed strong concern about the apparent forced diversion and requested the ICAO Secretariat to undertake a fact-finding investigation under Article 55 of the Chicago Convention for a future session of the council. In November 2021, ICAO announced that the investigation report had been delayed until January 2022, due to the "volume of data submitted and additional state clarifications still being required".

On 17 January 2022, ICAO published the fact-finding report for discussion at an ICAO Council meeting on 31 January. The report concluding that the bomb threat was "deliberately false", but could not "attribute the commission of this act of unlawful interference to any individual or State".

ICAO laid out that its team "was not provided with a satisfactory rationale to explain why records [of the Belarusian authorities] had not been preserved". Access to the controller of the Ryanair flight or to the call records of officials, as well as footage from well-placed airport cameras were also not provided to the investigation team.

=== Russian government ===
As Russian aviation authorities did not approve some new routes avoiding Belarus, Air France and Austrian Airlines had to cancel flights from Paris to Moscow on 26 May and from Vienna to Moscow on 27 May, while several other European carriers, including KLM and a British Airways cargo flight, were allowed to land in Russia using new routes. On 28 May 2021, Kremlin spokesman Dmitry Peskov asserted that "the problems were purely technical in nature, and that the issue should not become an additional irritant in Russia's relations with the European Union". On 1 June, Lufthansa was forced to cancel flights to Moscow because authorisations were not received on time, prompting the German government to retaliate by denying Russian airlines access to its airspace.

=== Legal investigation ===
On 23 May 2021, the Lithuanian public prosecutor's office opened a pre-trial investigation under the Criminal Code articles of "Hijacking an Aircraft" and "Treatment of Persons Prohibited under International Law". Because the aircraft is registered in Poland and is subject to Polish law, on 24 May, the Prosecutor General of Poland ordered the opening of an investigation into the case. On 14 June, Protasevich appeared at a press conference, in which Chief of the Belarus Air Force Igor Golub claimed that there was "no interception, no forced diversion from the state border or forced landing of the Ryanair plane". A BBC journalist present at the conference stated that Protasevich was clearly there under duress. Since there were four Americans on board the plane, the FBI investigated the incident, and on 20 January 2022, the United States Attorney for the Southern District of New York charged four Belarusian officials with conspiracy to commit aircraft piracy. The officials charged have not been arrested.

In September 2024, Polish prosecutors announced that they had enough evidence to charge three Belarusian citizens in connection with the forced landing of the flight. The individuals charged are the former director of the Belarusian air navigation agency, the shift manager of the Minsk air traffic control, and the head of the Belarusian KGB. According to a court statement, the charges stem from their actions in providing the flight crew with false information about an alleged explosive device on board, which led to the unlawful deprivation of liberty of 132 passengers, including Polish citizens. Prosecutors issued arrest warrants and announced that they would seek European Arrest Warrants and an Interpol red notice.

== Reactions ==
The act was denounced by the United States, United Kingdom, European Union, NATO, and some civil aviation authorities as an act of air piracy and state terrorism; a violation of international law, including the Convention on International Civil Aviation; and an infringement of basic human rights by an authoritarian regime.

=== National ===
- Australia's Foreign Affairs Minister Marise Payne condemned the "forced military interception" of a civilian aircraft and called for the "immediate release" of the arrested Belarusian opposition figure.
- Belgium's Prime Minister Alexander De Croo advocated for sanctions, "including banning Belavia from landing at EU airports", and stated that "Roman Protasevich must be immediately released".
- Canada's Foreign Affairs Minister Marc Garneau said that the incident was "a serious interference in civil aviation and a clear attack on media freedom". Canadian Prime Minister Justin Trudeau stated: "the behaviour of the Belarus regime is outrageous, illegal and completely unacceptable... we also condemn this kind of dangerous interference in civil aviation. Canada has existing sanctions in place against Belarus and will be examining further options." The incident led to the closure of the Embassy of Belarus in Canada.
- (China) Chinese Ministry of Foreign Affairs spokesman Zhao Lijian said on 25 May 2021: "The facts about the relevant incident [are] not yet clear. Before getting to the bottom of facts and truth, relevant sides should exercise restraint and avoid an escalation of the situation." On 27 May, Austrian Airlines cancelled a cargo flight from Vienna to Nanjing, because Chinese authorities did not approve the new route avoiding Belarus. A freighter scheduled to go from Nanjing to Vienna on 28 May was also cancelled due to the same reason.
- (Estonia) Estonian President Kersti Kaljulaid strongly condemned the forced landing of the Ryanair flight, labeling it as an "undisguised act of terrorism perpetrated by the state."
- (Greece) Greek Prime Minister Kyriakos Mitsotakis, from whose country the Ryanair flight originated, described the forced landing of the aircraft as a "shocking act" and said that political pressure on Belarus must be stepped up. Greek Foreign Minister Nikos Dendias described the event as a "state-sponsored abduction".
- (Hungary) Hungarian Minister of Foreign Affairs Péter Szijjártó said that forcing a commercial airliner to land "without any reason whatsoever" was "unacceptable, especially since the airliner in question was travelling between two European Union countries".
- (Republic of Ireland) Irish Taoiseach Micheál Martin described the incident as "a state-sponsored coercive act" and "piracy in the skies".
- (Italy) Italian foreign minister Luigi Di Maio said that the move was "unacceptable" and "a state hijacking". He said that he expected the EU's foreign policy chief Josep Borrell to discuss the matter with NATO Secretary General Jens Stoltenberg: "It is clear that this is not only a European question but a question of the alliance of values that we share with many of our allies, including overseas."
- Latvian Foreign Minister Edgars Rinkēvičs described the incident as "contrary to international law" and said that the reaction should be "strong and effective". On 24 May, Latvia expelled Belarus's diplomats in retaliation for Belarus expelling Latvia's staff (IIHF Belarus flag controversy).
- (Lithuania) Lithuanian President Gitanas Nausėda accused Belarusian authorities of carrying out an "abhorrent action". He also said: "I call on NATO and EU allies to immediately react to the threat posed to international civil aviation by the Belarus regime. The international community must take immediate steps that this does not repeat". Lithuanian Prime Minister Ingrida Šimonytė informed the public that the pre-trial investigation had been started for forced disappearance and hijacking of the aircraft.
- (Netherlands) Dutch caretaker Prime Minister Mark Rutte condemned the "unacceptable and unprecedented" attack.
- The New Zealand Foreign Minister Nanaia Mahuta said that the incident and the detention of Protasevich "raise[d] serious issues of international law" and called for a "full investigation". The New Zealand Cabinet also agreed to impose a travel ban on specific individuals associated with the Lukashenko regime and suspended high-level bilateral political and military contact with Belarus.
- (Norway) Norwegian foreign minister Ine Eriksen Søreide protested the Belarusian authorities forcing the airplane to land.
- (Poland) Polish Prime Minister Mateusz Morawiecki called the incident "an unprecedented act of state terrorism that cannot go unpunished".
- Portuguese Prime Minister António Costa accused Lukashenko of "crossing all red lines" with the decision to "hijack a civilian plane flying between two European capitals, two NATO capitals, with the exclusive objective of detaining a journalist and his partner". At the time of the incident, Portugal held the rotating presidency of the Council of the European Union.
- (Russia) Russian Foreign Minister Sergei Lavrov said that the way Belarus handled the incident was "an absolutely reasonable approach". State Duma deputy Leonid Kalashnikov, who chairs the Duma's committee on post-Soviet affairs, said that Belarus had the right to choose "those methods that it considers feasible and necessary" to combat threats to its national security. Russian Foreign Ministry spokeswoman Maria Zakharova compared the incident to the grounding of the presidential airplane of Bolivian President Evo Morales in Austria in July 2013 as European countries rescinded permission in midflight to refuel or to use their airspace. Washington had falsely suspected that American intelligence contractor Edward Snowden, whom the U.S. government wished to arrest, was on board the presidential airplane.
- (Sweden) Swedish Prime Minister Stefan Löfven said in a press conference that "the actions taken by Belarus is completely unacceptable and will be met with further sanctions". In the same speech he also called for an "immediate release of journalist Roman Protasevich and his girlfriend Sofia Sapega".
- Ukrainian President Volodymyr Zelenskyy instructed the government to suspend direct flights between Ukraine and Belarus and close off Belarusian airspace for the transit of Ukrainian aircraft. Prime Minister Denys Shmyhal convened an extraordinary cabinet meeting for 25 May.
- United Kingdom Foreign Secretary Dominic Raab said that the incident was a "shocking assault on civil aviation". Chairman of the British Foreign Affairs Committee Tom Tugendhat said: "If it's not an act of war, it's certainly a warlike act".
- United States President Joe Biden characterized the forced diversion as a "direct affront to international norms". He called the incident and the subsequent video with Protasevich "shameful assaults on both political dissent and the freedom of the press" and called for his release. Secretary of State Antony Blinken condemned the grounding of the flight as a "brazen and shocking act" and demanded an international investigation. There were American citizens on board the flight. Transportation Secretary Pete Buttigieg announced that the Biden administration and the Federal Aviation Administration were assessing whether it was safe for American-flagged airlines to continue to operate in Belarusian airspace. The FAA issued a NOTAM on 28 May 2021, formally advising U.S. passenger airliners to use "extreme caution" when flying over Belarus.

=== Multinational organisations ===
European Commission president Ursula von der Leyen described the incident as "utterly unacceptable", stating that "any violation of international air transport rules must bear consequences".

The International Civil Aviation Organization voiced its deep concern over "the apparent forced landing" of the flight. An ICAO tweet claimed that the forced landing could be in breach of the Chicago Convention on International Civil Aviation.

NATO Secretary-General Jens Stoltenberg tweeted that the grounding of the flight constitutes a "serious and dangerous incident which requires international investigation". Reuters reported that Turkey "insisted that any mention of support for more Western sanctions on Belarus, and calls for the release of political prisoners there, would be left out" of the text published on the NATO website.

United Nations Secretary-General António Guterres stated that he was "deeply concerned" over the apparent forced landing and subsequent detention of Roman Protasevich and asked for a full investigation into the incident.

=== Legal experts ===
British professor of international law Marco Roscini stated that Article 1 of the Chicago Convention provides that a state has "complete and exclusive sovereignty over the airspace above its territory", so an airplane in a state's airspace can be intercepted and ordered to land, provided the interception process in Annex 2 Appendix 2 is followed and it complies with the safety requirements of Article 3bis. However, in this case the diversion airport was more distant than the destination airport, so could potentially endanger safety, which would be contrary to Article 3bis. He noted that if a fake bomb threat had been made, a crime would have been committed under Article 1 of the Convention for the Suppression of Unlawful Acts against the Safety of Civil Aviation and Belarus should "facilitate the continuation of the journey of the passengers and crew".

Ukrainian aviation lawyer Andriy Huk suggested that the interception by the military aircraft and redirection of the airliner to a more distant airport could have jeopardized the safety of the passengers and crew. He also noted that Annex 2 Appendix 2 of the Chicago Convention considers interception of civilian aircraft by the military as a very last resort, but the Belarusian military jet took off immediately. Associate professor at the Russian Higher School of Economics Gleb Bogush stated that the staging of a bomb threat and the interception of the aircraft by the Belarusian authorities could have jeopardized the passengers and crew and that both the Chicago Convention and 1971 Montreal Convention should be used in the legal assessment of the case. He also called the situation "a very dangerous precedent".

Using the same two treaties as a basis, aviation lawyers with the international firm DLA Piper questioned the legality of the events and raised two possible ways that aircraft safety may have been jeopardized. The first is the burden of additional work required by the crew to land safely at an unfamiliar airport, which was further complicated by warnings of an on-board bomb and the presence of a military escort. The second is passengers reacting to news of a diversion, in particular, passengers who were aware of security personnel on the flight and the possibility of arrest as a result of the diversion. They noted that a key factor in assessing the case would be determining the true reason the flight was intercepted and diverted. The same experts also clarify that the aircraft, crew, and passengers were in an area of Belarusian sovereignty and subject to the country's laws while flying above it according to Article 1 of the Chicago Convention.

=== Airlines ===
Ryanair CEO Michael O'Leary stated that the event was a "state-sponsored hijacking" and that Ryanair believes that "there were some [Belarusian] KGB agents offloaded at the airport as well". Cyprus-registered Avia Solutions Group announced that their airlines will no longer use Belarusian airspace. On 24 May, Hungarian airline Wizz Air rerouted a flight between Kyiv, Ukraine and Tallinn, Estonia to avoid Belarusian airspace. Latvian airline AirBaltic announced on 24 May that it would no longer fly in Belarusian airspace until the situation became clearer. Dutch airline KLM stated that it was temporarily halting flights to Belarus. Scandinavian Airlines (SAS) announced that in line with instructions from the Swedish Transport Agency, the twice-weekly flight between Oslo and Kyiv would be rerouted to avoid Belarusian airspace. Lufthansa announced that it would suspend operations in Belarusian airspace until further notice. Singapore Airlines (SIA) also began rerouting flights bound for Europe to avoid Belarusian airspace from 25 May, citing safety concerns. On 15 June, O'Leary appeared before a British parliamentary committee to answer questions about the incident. He called the event a "premeditated breach of global aviation rules".

=== Other ===
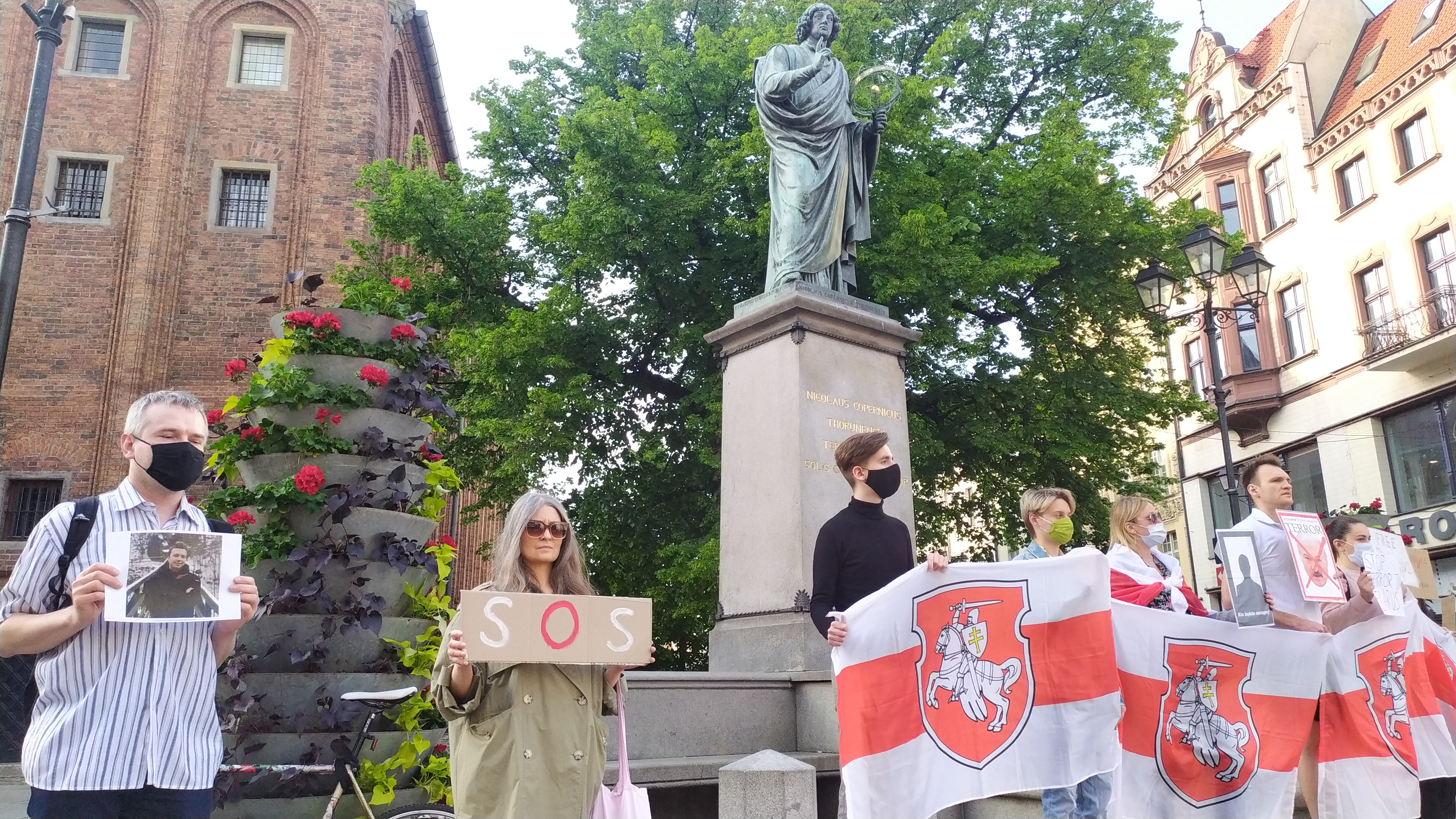
Protest in support of Protasevich in Toruń, Poland, 25 May 2021

Clotilde Armand, the mayor of Sector 1 of Romania's capital, Bucharest, promoted the idea of renaming Tuberozelor Street of the capital to Roman Protasevich Street, following calls from historian Andrei Oișteanu. The street is where the Embassy of the Republic of Belarus in Romania is located. Oișteanu argued that "all correspondence to and from the embassy would bear the dissident journalist's name and all Belarusian diplomats would have 'Roman Protasevich' printed on their business cards". Armand stated that "we live in a European state and this terrorist act of President Alexander Lukashenko to hijack a commercial flight between two EU & NATO member states can't go unpunished". The initiative led to the drafting of a letter from eight Romanian members of the European Parliament, including Dacian Cioloș, at that time the Chairman of Renew Europe Group. The letter suggested that all member states of the European Union should follow suit in renaming respective streets hosting Belarusian diplomatic missions in certain countries, in order to send "a strong message to [the] Belarus regime".

The International Federation of Air Line Pilots' Associations and the European Cockpit Association issued a joint statement calling the event "an unprecedented act of unlawful interference" and "state-sponsored hijacking". They called for an independent inquiry into the event.

On 28 May 2021, the European Broadcasting Union (EBU) announced that it would be suspending the membership of Belarusian broadcaster National State Television and Radio Company of the Republic of Belarus (BTRC), citing that they were "particularly alarmed by the broadcast of interviews apparently obtained under duress". BTRC was given two weeks to respond before the suspension came into effect. As a result, this prevents BTRC, and therefore, Belarus, from participating in or broadcasting events such as the Eurovision Song Contest and other events sanctioned by the EBU. Belarus had already been disqualified from the 2021 Eurovision Song Contest, as its chosen song and the suggested replacement broke rules on political statements in songs selected for the competition. BTRC was then expelled from the EBU on 1 July 2021.

In December 2021, air traffic controller Oleg Galegov, who was present in the tower during the interception, defected to Poland. In his statement, he confirmed that KGB officers were present in the tower during the operation, and took control in the moment of communicating the bomb threat to the pilots.

In July 2022, the International Civil Aviation Organization completed a review that condemned the "actions of the Government of Belarus in committing an act of unlawful interference".

== See also ==
- Arrest of Abdolmalek Rigi
- Evo Morales grounding incident, a presidential flight forced to land in Austria while falsely suspected of transporting Edward Snowden
- Extraordinary rendition
- International incident
- Transnational repression
- Belarus–European Union border crisis
- List of aircraft hijackings
