= Sofia Sapega =

Russian student and political prisoner

- Софья Сапега
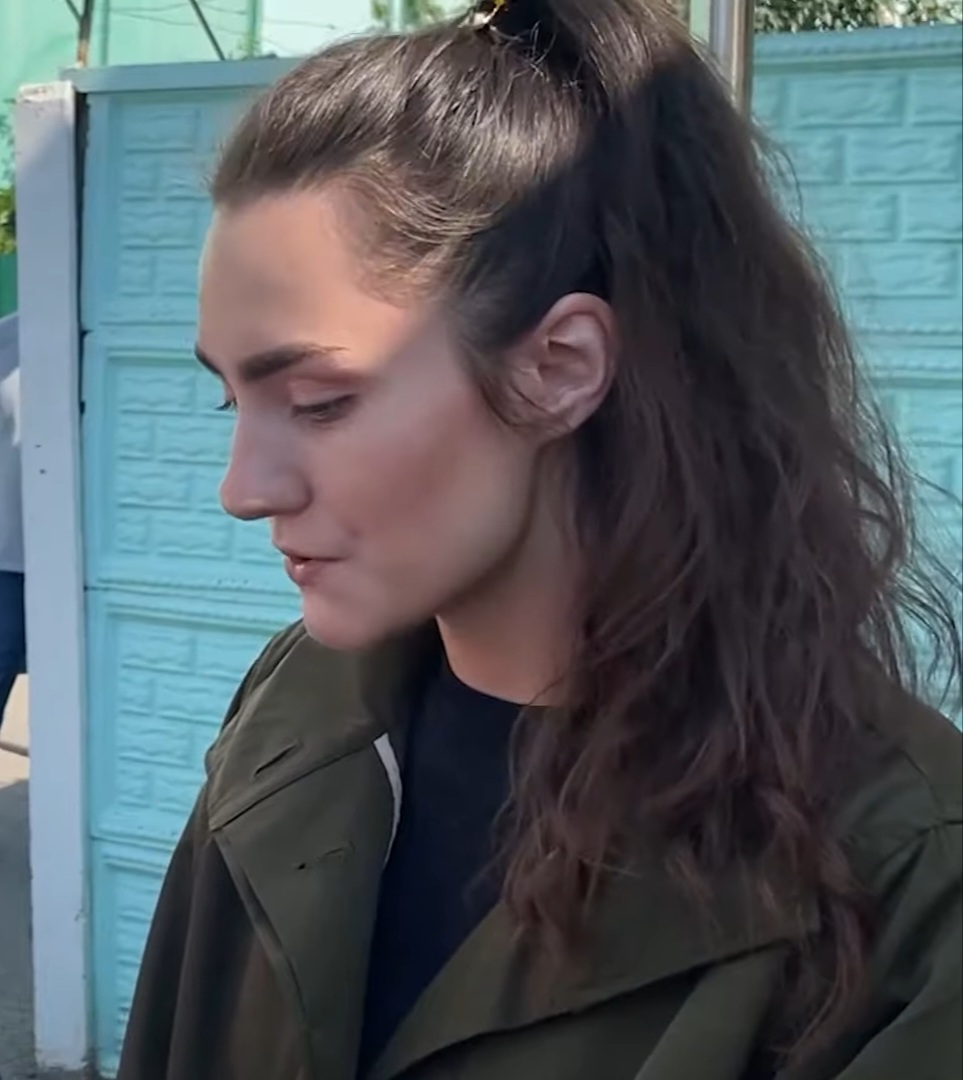
- Sapega on her release from prison in June 2023
- Born: 10 February 1998 (age 28); Vladivostok, Russia
- Occupations: Student, political prisoner

Sofia Andreyevna Sapega (Russian: Софья Андреевна Сапега; born 10 February 1998) is a Russian student and former political prisoner who was arrested by Belarusian authorities in May 2021, along with her then boyfriend Roman Protasevich, after their flight Ryanair Flight 4978 was diverted to Minsk due to a false bomb threat. In May 2022, she was sentenced to six years in prison; she was pardoned one year later.

== Early life and education ==
Sofia Sapega was born on 10 February 1998 in Vladivostok, Russia. As a child, she moved to Belarus but retained her Russian citizenship.

She studied law at the European Humanities University in Vilnius, Lithuania, and was due to defend her master's thesis before she was arrested. According to the university, she had Russian citizenship and a residence permit in Belarus and Lithuania.

== Arrest and trial ==
Sofia Sapega was on Ryanair Flight 4978 from Athens to Vilnius along with Roman Protasevich, whom she was dating, when the flight was diverted to Minsk, Belarus, after a false bomb threat was passed on by Belarusian air traffic control. She was remanded in custody for two months. According to the Russian Ministry of Foreign Affairs, Sapega was accused of breaking Belarusian law in August and September 2020; the ministry did not specify which laws she allegedly broke. In a video released by Belarusian authorities, Sapega claimed that she was an editor of the Black Book of Belarus, a Telegram channel which had published personal information of security officials that Belarus had classified as an extremist group.

Sapega's mother and several of her classmates told BBC News that she was not involved in the 2020–2021 Belarusian protests, and had been living in Vilnius since August 2020. Sapega's mother was not allowed to visit her daughter in prison.

Following her arrest, Belarusian human rights organizations including the Belarusian Helsinki Committee and Viasna Human Rights Centre recognized her as a political prisoner and demanded her release.

In a 26 May 2021 speech in the Belarusian parliament, President Alexander Lukashenko labelled Protasevich and Sapega "agents of Western intelligence". On 4 June 2021, the chairman of the Investigative Committee of the State Security Committee of the Republic of Belarus (KGB) said that Sofia Sapega was charged with "inciting hatred" and "mass disorder".

On 3 December 2021, Sapega was finally charged with "inciting hatred", facing up to six to twelve years of imprisonment.

On 6 May 2022, Sapega was sentenced to six years in prison for "inciting social hatred". Her lawyer said that he would appeal directly to Russian president Vladimir Putin because Sapega is a Russian citizen.

On 14 March 2023, Sapega was included in the registry of terrorists by the KGB.

On 10 April 2023, Sapega agreed to a prison transfer to Russia following her family's request, and after Belarusian authorities did not object provided Sapega finished her sentence in a Russian prison.

On 7 June 2023, it was announced that Sapega had been pardoned by Lukashenko, reportedly at the request of the Russian governor of Primorsky Krai, Oleg Kozhemyako, who led a delegation. After her release, Sapega said that the pardon from Lukashenko was unexpected to her. When questioned about Roman Protasevich and his testimony against her, Sapega said she preferred to "not say anything about this person [Protasevich] and I just wish him to live his life with dignity".

== Personal life ==
Sapega started dating Roman Protasevich in late 2020. According to Sapega's mother, she and Protasevich had known each other for about six months prior to their arrests in May 2021. Protasevich's relationship with Sapega eventually ended and Protasevich married another woman in May 2022.
