= Stsiapan Putsila =

Belarusian blogger and dissident (born 1998)

- Сцяпан Пуціла
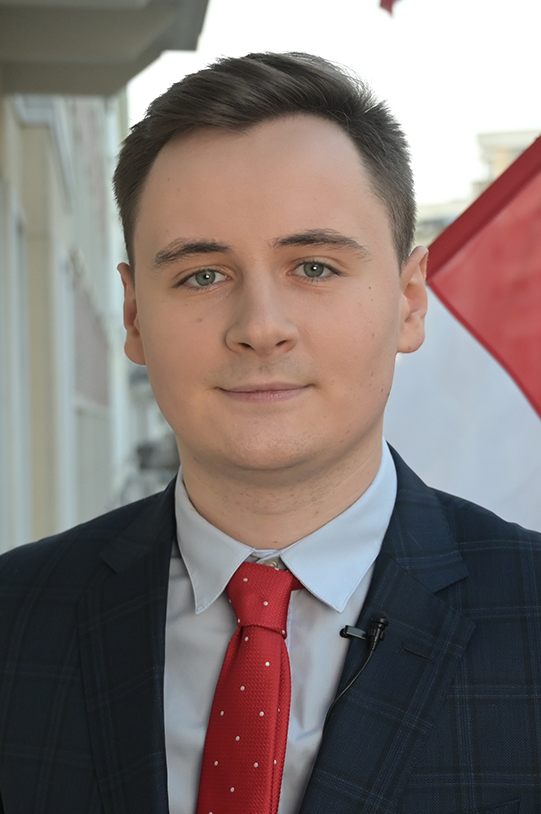
- Putsila in c. 2021
- Born: 27 July 1998 (age 27); Minsk, Belarus
- Other name: NEXTA
- Education: Belarusian Humanities Lyceum; University of Silesia in Katowice
- Occupations: Journalism; Blogging; Music

YouTube information
- Channels: NEXTA; NEXTA Live
- Years active: 2015–present
- Genres: Politics; News
- Subscribers: 645 thousand (NEXTA); 2.81 million (NEXTA Live)
- Views: 235 million (NEXTA); 2.6 billion (NEXTA Live)
- Last updated: 22 October 2025
- Website: nexta.tv

Stsiapan Aliaksandravich Putsila (Note: Also known as Stepan Aleksandrovich Putilo (Russian: Степан Александрович Путило)) (Belarusian: Сцяпан Аляксандравіч Пуціла, romanized: Stsiapan Alyaksandravich Putsila; born 27 July 1998) is a Belarusian journalist, blogger, film director, TV presenter, and opposition figure, mostly known as founder of the media outlet Nexta. The Telegram channel NEXTA Live he founded was at times the biggest Russian-speaking channel in the world.

He currently lives in exile in Poland.

== Life ==
Putsila is the son of Aliaksandr Putsila, a sports journalist and commentator for Belsat TV. According to his own words, Putsila had been interested in video content since his childhood.

Putsila graduated from the Belarusian Humanities Lyceum in Minsk where he shot his first video clips and where he began to engage in journalism by publishing his own newspaper.

=== Foundation of NEXTA ===
In October 2015, Putsila founded the YouTube channel NEXTA, originally as a music channel. The first video that was uploaded was a video clip, "No Way Out", dedicated to the 2015 Belarusian presidential election and massive falsifications. Belarusian KGB immediately demonstrated interest in NEXTA. While Putsila was still attending school, law enforcement made visits to find information about him.

In 2017 the music band broke up and Putilo started using the channel to 'accumulate the trash happening in Lukashenko's Belarus', making weekly reviews of state news. In that time independent media with video were scarce and Nexta soon became popular.

From 2016 to 2019, Putsila attended the University of Silesia in Katowice, where he completed a degree in film and television production.

=== Political persecution and role in the 2020 protest movement ===
In autumn 2018, he created the Telegram channel NEXTA Live which was subscribed by 2,000 people on the first day. In the same year, Putsila was charged with "insulting the president" because of two YouTube videos. His mother's house was searched, but a few months later, the case was dismissed.

In October 2019, Putsila published his documentary film "Lukashenko. Criminal records", which gained around 3 million views. In December of the same year, the film was included in the list of extremist materials of the Belarusian Ministry of Information.

During the 2020–2021 Belarusian protests, his Telegram channel NEXTA became the leading platform covering and coordinating the opposition demonstrations. The media outlet quickly transformed from a reporting tool into a de facto coordinator of the protests. The channel content included calls for help, police maps, as well as contacts between lawyers and human rights activists. In August 2020, the main criminal investigation department of criminal police of the Ministry of Internal Affairs of Belarus initiated a criminal case against Putsila. He faces up to 15 years in jail for organizing "mass riots, accompanied by violence against an individual, arson, destruction of property or armed resistance to representatives of the authorities" and other accusations.

On 5 November 2020, the Investigative Committee of Belarus put Putsila along with Roman Protasevich, the former editor-in-chief of NEXTA on the international wanted list. On 19 November 2020, the Belarus KGB included Putsila and Protasevich in the list of persons involved in terrorist activities.

In November 2020, Belarus applied to Poland for the extradition of Stsiapan Putsila. In January 2022, the Warsaw district court declared that Putsila's extradition would be "legally impermissible". Judge Dariusz Łubowski commented on the demands of the Belarusian government, by saying: "This country demands the extradition of a completely innocent citizen just because he has different views than the psychopathic dictator - a dictator who isn't recognised by any civilised state". As a result of that, the Prosecutor General's Office of Belarus initiated criminal proceedings against Łubowski.

=== Trial in absentia ===
In February 2023, a trial opened in a Minsk court against Putsila, Jan Rudik (both in absentia), and detained blogger and journalist Roman Protasevich. On 21 April 2023, prosecutor Nataliya Sokolova asked for a sentence of 20 years in prison for Putsila on charges related to his role in Nexta.

On 3 May 2023, Putsila was sentenced to 20 years in prison.

== Filmography ==
- 2019: Lukashenko. Criminal records on YouTube
- 2020: Lukashenko. A False Cliffhanger on YouTube
- 2021: Lukashenko. The Gold Mine on YouTube
- 2021: The Gold Mine 2: In the shadow of the dictator on YouTube
- 2022: The Gold Mine 3. The shameful finale of Lukashenka on YouTube
- 2022: Poland. Solidarity in blood on YouTube
- 2023: Putin. Along the path of Hitler on YouTube

== Awards and recognitions ==
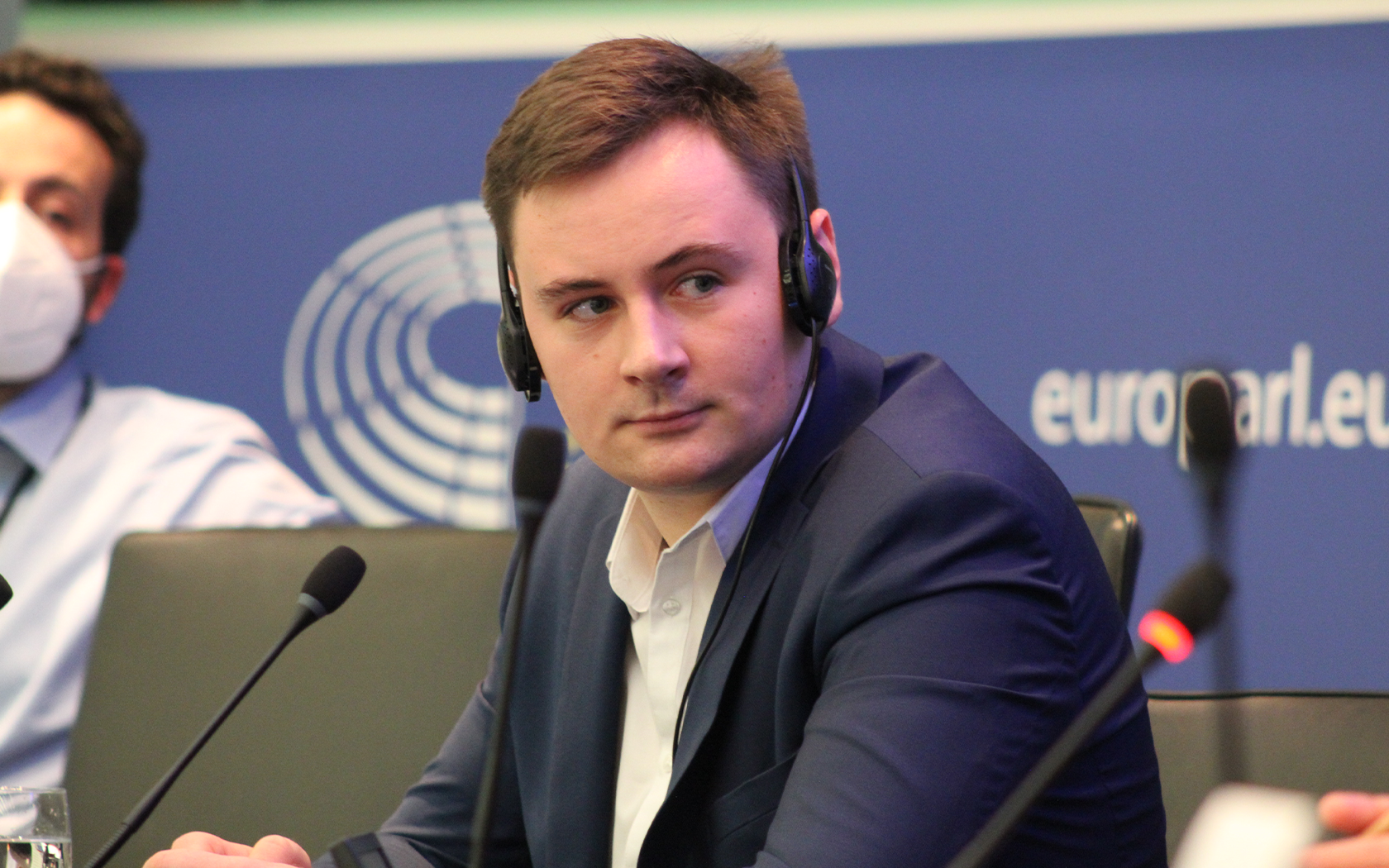
Stsiapan Putsila at the award ceremony of the Sakharov Prize in 2020

- 2019: National Victar Ivashkevich Human Rights Prize by Charter 97
- 2020: Award "Profession — Journalist" by the initiative Open Russia (was awarded to the collective NEXTA as a whole)
- 2020: Sakharov Prize for Freedom of Thought by the European Parliament (one of the awarded representatives of the democratic opposition in Belarus)
- 2020: Among the Top-5 nominees of the Polish Grand Press Award
- 2021: Nominee for the "30 Most Promising Russians Under 30" according to Forbes magazine in the category "New Media"
- 2025: Mentioned in the Forbes magazine list "30 Under 30 - Europe - Media & Marketing"
