= Nexta =

Belarusian Telegram channel

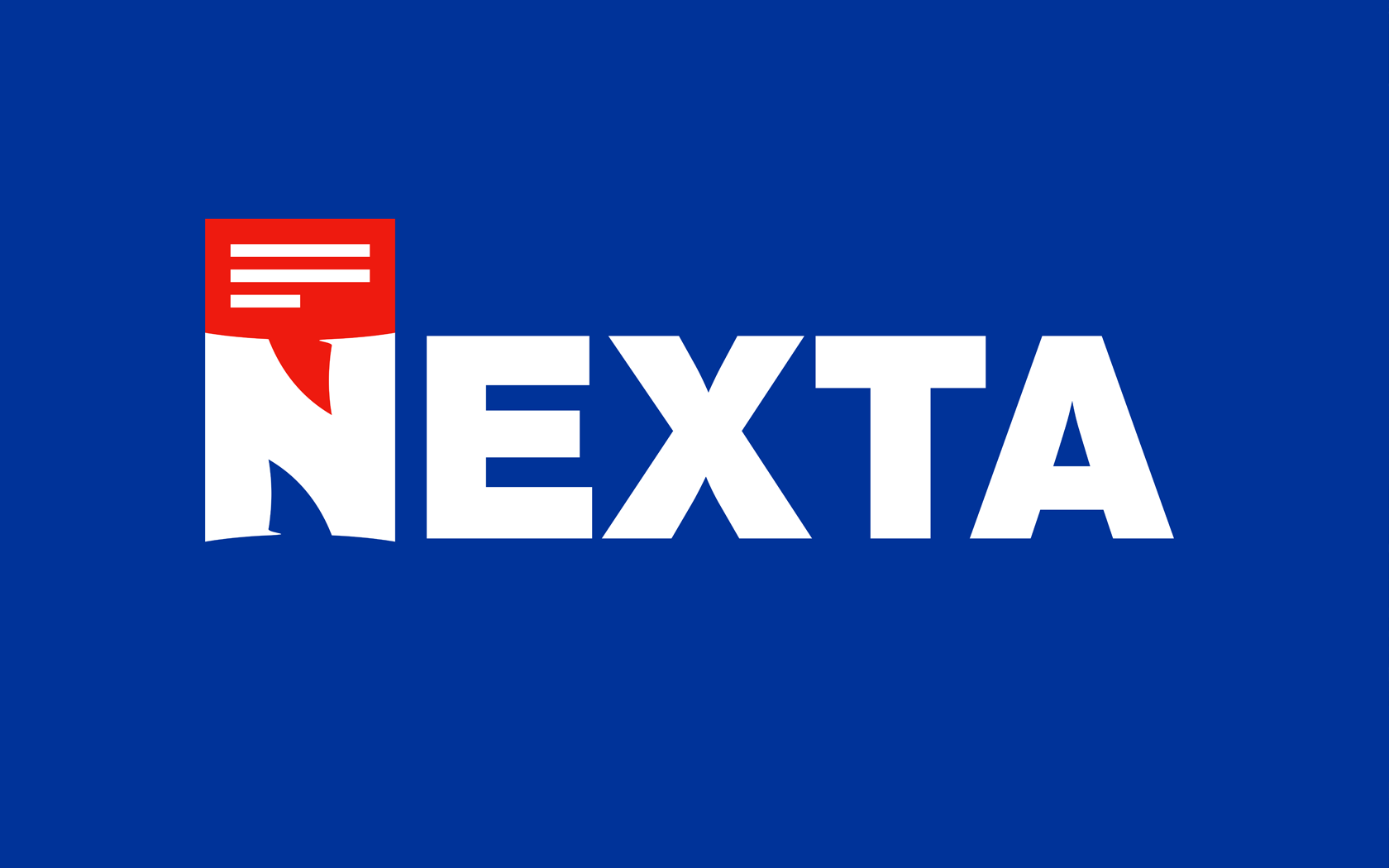
- Nexta Logo
- Status: Active
- Founded: 2015
- Founder: Stsiapan Putsila
- Country of origin: Belarus
- Headquarters location: Warsaw, Poland
- Distribution: Online
- Key people: Stsiapan Putsila, Roman Protasevich, Tadeusz Giczan
- Official website: nexta.tv

Nexta (Belarusian pronunciation: [nʲexta] niekh-ta) is a Belarusian media outlet that is primarily distributed through Telegram and YouTube channels. The YouTube channel was founded by then 17-year-old student Stsiapan Putsila. The channel's headquarters are located in Warsaw, Poland, after its founder went into exile.

It became the biggest Telegram channel in Belarus as the primary source of news covering events that followed the 2020–2021 Belarusian protests. The Telegram channel mostly featured short videos and images submitted by users taken during the rallies, while longer original videos are shared on YouTube. During the 2022 Russian invasion of Ukraine, Nexta became an operational resource reporting on the events of the war. Nexta operates one of the largest Telegram news channels in the Russian-speaking world, with almost one million subscribers. According to a statistic of the media project "Information Policy" from July 2024, NEXTA Live is the second-largest Belarusian YouTube channel by number of views.

Nexta faces pressure from Belarusian authorities. Since October 2020, Nexta and its logo are considered extremist content in Belarus. Its founder Stsiapan Putsila and the former editor-in-chief Roman Protasevich were put by Belarusian authorities on a list of "individuals involved in terrorist activity" in November 2020. Amnesty International stated that the classification of the bloggers as terrorists was "arbitrary" and that the Belarusian authorities' decision was based solely on Putsila's and Protasevich's journalism. Since October 2021, NEXTA, NEXTA Live and Luxta are also classified as extremist groups. In April 2022, they were declared a terrorist organization by the Supreme Court of Belarus.

== Name ==
Nexta is a play on the Belarusian niechta (нехта), meaning "someone", and the English next, as in the "next generation". It is pronounced as nekhta and not as neksta.

== Team ==
In May 2019, the channels of NEXTA were managed by Stsiapan Putsila alone. In the meantime, an entire editorial team is behind the media oulet. All journalists working for NEXTA live in Poland or perhaps in other European countries. The information about their whereabouts is kept secret.

Among the former members of the editorial board are:

- Roman Protasevich, editor-in-chief of NEXTA until September 2020. Protasevich was arrested by Belarusian authorities after his flight, Ryanair Flight 4978, was diverted to Minsk on the orders of Belarusian president Alexander Lukashenko on 23 May 2021, because of a false bomb threat passed on by Belarusian air traffic control;
- Yan Rudzik, former employee of Belsat, who left NEXTA in 2021. In May 2022, Rudzik was charged by Belarusian authorities with "directing the activities of a terrorist organisation Nexta" along with Putsila; In May 2023, Rudzik was sentenced in absentia to 19 years in prison. In March 2024, Rudzik joined the Kastuś Kalinoŭski Regiment in Ukraine.
- Tadeusz Giczan, former editor-in-chief.

== History ==
=== Foundation ===
Nexta was founded in 2015 as a YouTube music channel for the band of same name by Stsiapan Putsila, a son of a sports journalist and a commentator on Belsat TV-channel. The first video that was uploaded was a video clip under title ‘No Way Out’, dedicated to the 2015 Belarusian presidential election and massive falsifications. The KGB immediately demonstrated interest in Nexta. In that time Putsila was still going to school, the law enforcement made visits to find out about him. In 2017 the band broke up and Putsila started using the channel to ‘accumulate the trash happening in Lukashenko's Belarus’, making weekly reviews of state news. In that time independent media with video were scarce and Nexta soon became popular. Putsila's film under title ‘They Are Sentenced to Death’ was uploaded to YouTube in 2017 and soon gained 5.5 million views. The film ‘Lukashenko. Criminal Files’ raised wide public outcry, Putsila became a non-grata person in Belarus.

In Autumn 2018 Putsila launched the Nexta Live Telegram channel. On the very first day more than 2000 subscribers from YouTube joined it.

In 2018 Putsila was charged with ‘offending the president’. His mother's apartment was searched by the law enforcement.

In 2019 Roman Protasevich joined Nexta, the team grew to four men. The channel mostly used user-generated content, sometimes it was sent anonymously even from the police officers. As stated by the founders, Nexta survived on selling ads.

=== Conflict with government-controlled TV channels ===
In 2018 the Belarusian Telegraph Agency accused Putsila of stealing their videos. The blogger complained that he received reports from fake personalities with complaints of copyright violation. Putsila explained that in his films no more than 20% of footage were taken from state TV-channels, which monopolized all video content related to Lukashenko. At that time Nexta's YouTube channel had more than 200000 subscribers. Putsila explained that according to the Belarusian law, citations from TV shows were allowed to be used for analytical, evaluational, and informational purposes. Since the conflict, he started deleting the logos from his content.

=== Slonim's mayor court case ===
On September 26, 2019, it became known that the chairman of the Slonim District Executive Committee Gennady Homich filed a lawsuit against Stsiapan Putsila. In the document, the official asked to refute an information, according to which wife of the chairman and the chairman of the district executive committee had been detained by the traffic police for driving under the influence of alcohol.

On 12 November, the Minsk District Court ordered that a rebuttal should be posted in the Telegram channel Nexta and sentenced Putsila to a fine of Br 3,000. The blogger said that he would not execute the court's decision, questioning the independence of the Belarusian courts.

=== Chudentsov case ===
On November 21, 2019, the journalist Vladimir Chudentsov, who collaborated with Nexta, was arrested by Belarusian customs officers as he was about to cross the border into Poland. The state officials claim they found 0.87 grams of cannabis in his clothes. Reporters Without Borders commented that it questions the circumstances of Chudentsov's arrest. After his arrest, NEXTA posted a video in support of Chudentsov. Chudentsov was sentenced to 5.5 years in jail. Stsiapan Putsila thinks that Chudensov became a victim of the revenge of Belarusian state authorities because he took part in the production of a documentary film on Alexander Lukashenko.

=== 2020–2021 protests in Belarus ===
After the first cases of brutal police violence people started gathering on central squares in Minsk and other Belarusian cities on protest rallies, demanding re-elections and immediate release of all detained citizen. Nationwide protests were not covered by the state-controlled media, the Internet was completely shut down for several days. Other independent sources of information (such as Tut.by) were blocked. Nexta managed to bypass most of the blackout, the authorities were unable to restrict access to Telegram groups to the same extent. They published data sent by users, such as current-time locations of the police blocks and patrols, times and spots to gather, pleas for help from the protesters, facts and photos of law enforcement violence, etc. Only between 9 and 16 August 2020, the number of subscribers to Nexta Live grew from 300000 to 2 million. As of August 2020, Nexta had more than 740000 subscribers on YouTube and Telegram channels.

The influential role of NEXTA during the protest movement was reported by numerous international media outlets including Reuters, Associated Press, BBC and New York Times.

Nexta was pressured by the Belarusian government for coordinating with activists during the protests, including giving detailed instructions as to where and when protests should take place, which according to some journalists means that Nexta is not a journalistic news source. It has also been criticised for publishing unverified information. Protasevich and Putsila received numerous threats both from the Belarusian regime, they experienced massive attacks from Kremlin Bots.

In September 2020 Nexta expanded and grew into an editors office, they hired more journalists and developed thematic departments.

=== Extremism accusations, bans and repressions ===
In October 2020 Nexta channel and its logo were declared extremist materials in Belarus. By that time Nexta and Nexta Live had near 2 million subscribers. Putsila promised to re-brand the channel. In a month, the authorities opened a criminal case against Putsila and Protasevich, accusing him for ‘organizing the mass riot’.

On 19 November 2020, Protasevich and Putsila became the first Belarusian citizen to be included on the country's official "list of terrorists". Human rights organization Amnesty International called the classification of the bloggers as terrorists "arbitrary" and said that the Belarusian authorities' decision was based solely on the journalistic work of them.

As of March 2021, the Belarusian Investigative Committee was seeking to recognize Nexta's editorial board as a ‘foreign extremist agent’.

In May 2021 Denis Urad, a former officer of the Belarusian Army, was sentenced to 18 years for treason. He was accused for disclosing to Nexta copies of the MVD request from the Ministry of Defence to send 4000 soldiers during the protests of 2020.

==== Protasevich arrest ====
Tadeusz Giczan became Editor-in-chief after Roman Protasevich shifted to the "Belarus of the Brain" Telegram channel formerly edited by a detained blogger, Ihar Losik.

On his way to Vilnius back from vacation in Greece, Roman Protasevich, along with his girlfriend Sofia Sapega, was arrested by Belarusian authorities after his flight, Ryanair Flight 4978, was diverted to Minsk on the orders of Belarusian president Alexander Lukashenko on 23 May 2021, because of a false bomb threat conveyed by Belarusian air traffic control. In a July 2022 report, the International Civil Aviation Organization condemned the forced landing as "illegal interference" by the Belarusian government in aviation.

In June 2021, Protasevich was put under house arrest. On 6 May 2022, his former girlfriend Sapega was sentenced to six years in prison for "inciting social hatred".

==== Designation as 'extremist group' and trial ====
In October 2021 the government classified Nexta, Nexta Live and Luxta as an 'extremist group' and declared that all followers of such Telegram channels will face prosecution under Criminal Code.

In January 2022, the Warsaw district court declared that an extradition of Stsiapan Putsila would be "legally impermissible". Previously, Belarus applied to Poland for his extradition. Judge Dariusz Łubowski commented on the demands of the Belarusian government, by saying: "This country demands the extradition of a completely innocent citizen just because he has different views than the psychopathic dictator--a dictator who isn't recognised by any civilised state". As a result of that, the Prosecutor General's Office of Belarus initiated criminal proceedings against Łubowski.

On April 8, 2022, the Supreme Court of Belarus declared the Nexta, Nexta Live and Luxta channels a "terrorist organization" and banned their activities in the country. This was done at the request of the Prosecutor General of Belarus.

On February 16, 2023, in Minsk a trial started against Raman Pratasevich, Stsiapan Putsila and Yan Rudzik. Only Pratasevich was present on site. The other two defendants are in exile. The Committee to Protect Journalists called the authorities to "immediately stop this sham trial, drop all charges against Pratasevich, Rudzik, and Putsila, and let the journalists work freely." On May 3, 2023, Pratasevich was sentenced to eight years of prison. His co-defendants, Yan Rudzik and Stsiapan Putsila, who were tried in absentia, were sentenced to 19 and 20 years in prison.

On 22 May 2023 it was announced that Pratasevich had been pardoned. His pardon was confirmed the next day and Pratasevich was released from custody.

== Reception ==
On November 22, 2022, the European Parliament passed a resolution in which it calls on the commission to further support independent news outlets, especially new media such as Nexta, which "despite broad audience in Belarus, so far has not received any EU financial support".

On July 31, 2023, the European Parliament passed another resolution in which it asks the European Commission and the Member States, to strengthen Belarusian media outlets, including Nexta.

== Awards ==
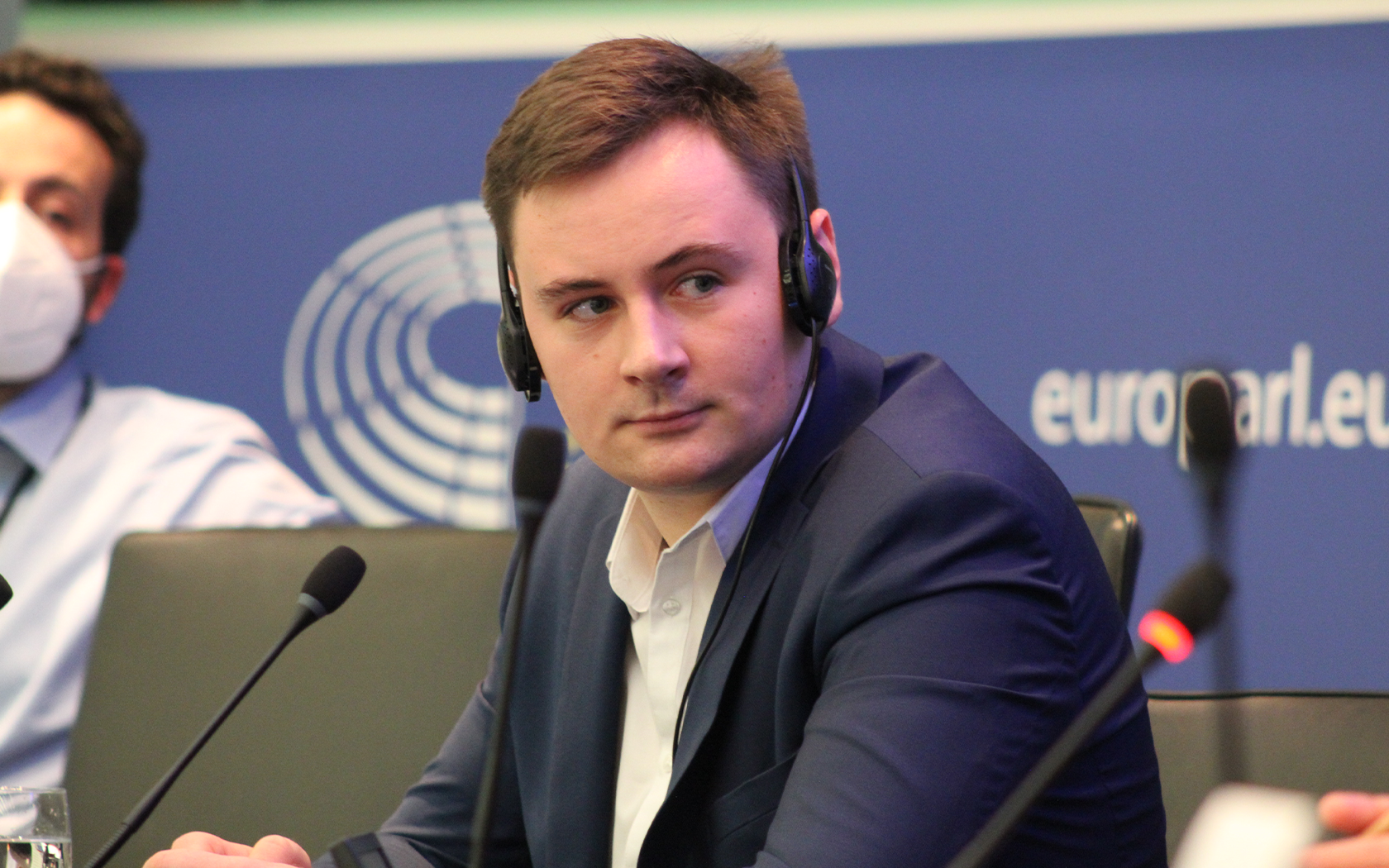
Stsiapan Putsila at the award ceremony of the Sakharov Prize in 2020

- 2019: National Victar Ivashkevich Human Rights Prize by Charter 97
- 2020: Award "Profession — Journalist" by the initiative Open Russia
- 2020: Sakharov Prize for Freedom of Thought by the European Parliament (one of the awarded representatives of the democratic opposition in Belarus)
- 2020: Among the Top-5 nominees of the Polish Grand Press Award
- 2021: Winner of the Global Belarusian Solidarity Award by the Center for Belarusian Solidarity in the category "Telegram for You"

== Misinformation ==
In October 2022, a video had been gaining traction on social media allegedly showing Turkish mercenaries going to fight for Russia in its invasion of Ukraine. The video was first published by a pro-Russian Telegram channel claiming that "Turkish legionnaires joined the Russian army and will take part in combat operations in Ukraine". But it quickly gained traction when Nexta shared it with a similar claim. However journalists from Euronews Turkish-language service confirmed that the men are speaking a dialect of Turkish but are not from Turkey. The mix between this dialect and some Russian words signals that these men were most likely Meskhetian Turks (Ahiska Turks). Euronews spoke to a representative of Ahiska Turks abroad who confirmed that the men in the video are speaking the Ahiska dialect. He also told that he believes that these men were living in Russia and therefore being mobilised for the war in Ukraine. Adding that, since Ahiska Turks consider themselves Turkish, this is why the soldiers were seen with a Turkish flag in the video.

== Filmography ==
- 2019: Lukashenko. Criminal materials on YouTube
- 2020: Lukashenko. Over the abyss of lies on YouTube
- 2021: Lukashenko. The Gold Mine on YouTube
- 2021: The Gold Mine 2: In the shadow of the dictator on YouTube
- 2022: Lukashenko ditched Putin / A movie about betrayal on YouTube
- 2022: The Gold Mine 3. The shameful finale of Lukashenka on YouTube
- 2022: Poland. Solidarity in blood on YouTube
- 2023: Putin. On the path of Hitler on YouTube
- 2023: Solovyov's fan got to Europe and was shocked / ProstoKvasha on YouTube
- 2024: Lukashenko. 30 years on the brink / 1 episode on YouTube
- 2024: Lukashenko. 30 years on the brink / 2 episode on YouTube
