= Roman Protasevich =

Belarusian blogger (born 1995)

- Роман Протасевич; Раман Пратасевіч
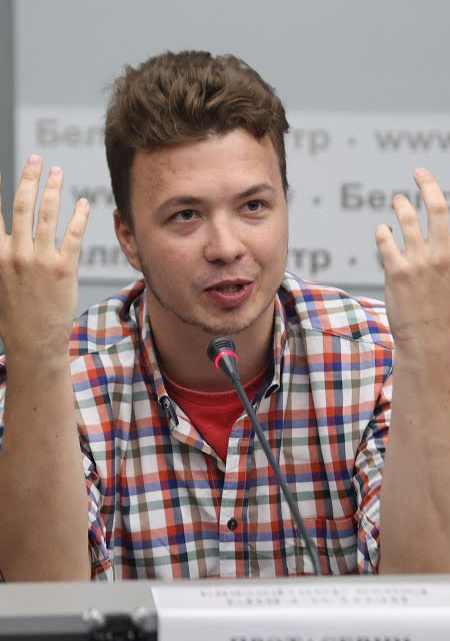
- Protasevich in 2021
- Born: 5 May 1995 (age 31); Minsk, Belarus
- Education: Belarusian State University (expelled)
- Occupations: Blogger; activist; photographer
- Years active: 2011–present
- Organization: Nexta
- Movement: Young Front

Roman Dmitriyevich Protasevich (Note: Russian: Роман Дмитриевич Протасевич) or Raman Dzmitryevich Pratasevich (Note: Belarusian: Раман Дзмітрыевіч Пратасевіч) (born 5 May 1995) is a Belarusian TV presenter and former blogger and political activist. He was the editor-in-chief of the Telegram channel Nexta and chief editor of the Telegram channel Belarus of the Brain (Russian: Беларусь головного мозга).

Protasevich and Sofia Sapega were arrested by Belarusian authorities after their flight, Ryanair Flight 4978, was diverted to Minsk on the orders of Belarusian president Alexander Lukashenko on 23 May 2021, because of a false bomb threat passed on by Belarusian air traffic control. On 3 May 2023, he was sentenced to eight years in prison. However, on 22 May, it was announced that Protasevich had been pardoned. Lukashenko later alleged that Protasevich has been an agent of the Belarusian intelligence agency KGB.

== Personal life ==
Protasevich was born on 5 May 1995 in Minsk, Belarus. He moved to Poland in 2019.

His father is a Belarusian army reserve officer and a lecturer at a Belarusian military academy; he was stripped of his military rank and awards by a personal decree of President Alexander Lukashenko on 6 May 2021. Protasevich's parents moved to join their son in Poland in August 2020.

Protasevich was in a relationship with Sofia Sapega, a Russian citizen, who was also detained by Belarusian authorities on 23 May 2021. According to Sapega's mother, she and Protasevich had known each other for about six months prior to their arrests in May 2021. Protasevich's relationship with Sapega eventually ended, and Protasevich married another woman in May 2022.

== Career ==
=== Opposition activism and work in Belarus (2011–2019) ===
Protasevich has been an anti-government activist and has participated in protests since the early 2010s, leading to several arrests.

Since 2011, he has been a member of the Young Front opposition organization. He co-administered a major group in VKontakte, a social network, in opposition to President Alexander Lukashenko until 2012, when it was hacked by the authorities. For a month, he took part in the Euromaidan protests.

Protasevich studied journalism at Belarusian State University, until he was expelled in 2018. In 2017, he was accused of participating in an unauthorized event in Kurapaty, but he proved in court that he had an alibi for that day. In an interview, he said he was a reporter for several major Belarusian media outlets for several years. He also worked for Radio Free Europe/Radio Liberty's Belarus channel from 2017 to 2018. He had been a Václav Havel Fellow in Journalism in Prague, co-sponsored by the broadcaster.

In March 2019, Protasevich was a photographer for Euroradio.fm at a meeting of the prime ministers of Austria (Sebastian Kurz) and Belarus (Sergey Rumas) in Minsk. In addition to taking photos, he made at least one video report for Euroradio about Chechen refugees trying to move to the EU through Belarus.

=== Opposition activism in exile (2019–2021) ===
In 2019, Protasevich moved to Poland, and on 22 January 2020, he announced that he had asked for political asylum there.

In 2020, he ran the Nexta Telegram channel together with its creator, Stsiapan Putsila. In August 2020, after Belarusian authorities tried to disable internet access during the 2020 presidential election, Nexta became one of the main sources of information about the protests against alleged rigged elections and helped coordinate the event. The channel amassed nearly 800,000 new subscribers within a week. In September 2020, Protasevich left Nexta.

On 5 November 2020, Protasevich and Putsila were accused of organizing mass riots (article 293 of the Belarusian criminal code), of actions that grossly violate public order (article 342), and incitement of social enmity based on professional affiliation (article 130, part 3). On 19 November, the Belarusian KGB put them both on the "list of organizations and individuals involved in terrorist activities" for "mass unrest".

On 2 March 2021, Protasevich announced that he had begun working for the Telegram channel Belarus of the Brain, formerly edited by a detained blogger, Ihar Losik.

== Arrest ==
=== Ryanair Flight 4978 ===
On 23 May 2021, Ryanair Flight 4978 (Athens–Vilnius), with Protasevich on board, received a false bomb threat and was diverted by Belarusian air traffic control to Minsk National Airport. While in Athens, Protasevich sent messages through Telegram saying he had seen a bald man at the airport following him and taking photographs of him. Minsk airport staff said they landed the plane due to a report of a bomb aboard. Lithuanian airport authorities stated that they had not been informed of a bomb threat. The plane changed course just before it would have entered Lithuanian airspace. According to a witness cited by Reuters, upon hearing of the diversion to Minsk, Protasevich immediately gave some of his luggage to his girlfriend, Sapega. In Minsk, Protasevich and Sapega were arrested at passport control. No bomb was found aboard the plane. Belarusian president Alexander Lukashenko's press service announced that he personally ordered the plane redirected to Minsk and sent a Belarusian Air Force Mig-29 fighter aircraft to escort it. However, the International Civil Aviation Organization (ICAO) fact-finding task force subsequently determined the MiG-29 was just tasked with communications backup and did not contact, approach, or escort the flight.

Shortly after landing in Minsk, Protasevich was taken away by Belarusian police. A fellow passenger was reported to have heard Protasevich speak of the possibility of facing the death penalty, which exiled Belarusian opposition leader Sviatlana Tsikhanouskaya warned about the same day. The mass unrest charges against Protasevich could carry a prison sentence of up to fifteen years. Protasevich had traveled to Athens to cover a visit by Tsikhanouskaya to the Delphi Economic Forum.

On 19 July 2022, ICAO stated that the grounding of the flight was illegal and blamed senior Belarusian officials, also condemning Protasevich's arrest and calling the bomb threat "deliberately false".

=== Detention and forced confessions ===
The day after the forced Ryanair landing, Belarusian authorities issued a video in which Protasevich claimed he had been treated well and not been harmed, though he looked visibly stressed. There were dark markings on his forehead, and he stated that he would confess to organizing "mass unrest" and that he did not have health problems, after unconfirmed reports of a heart condition. Protasevich's father said the video appeared forced and his nose seemed to have been broken, while allies of Protasevich, including exiled opposition leader Sviatlana Tsikhanouskaya, said the video "is how Roman looks under physical and moral pressure". The Viasna Human Rights Centre and other Belarusian human rights organizations named Protasevich a political prisoner in a joint statement and demanded his immediate release. Amnesty International called for the release of Protasevich and Sapega, saying "their arrest is arbitrary and unlawful, and its circumstances are nothing short of horrifying".

The Belarusian authorities prevented Protasevich's parents and a hired lawyer, Inessa Olenskaya, from visiting him and obtaining information about his location and medical condition until 27 May 2021. On 25 May, Olenskaya was not allowed to enter SIZO No.1 prison in Minsk and did not get a call back from the Investigative Committee. The Minsk branch of the Investigative Committee delayed the process of signing the charging documents, and SIZO staff later claimed that they did not have Protasevich. On 27 May 2021, his mother held a press conference, calling for medical help for her son. She said she had no information about his location and complained that she could not send him any things or messages via his lawyer.

Olenskaya made a formal complaint to the office of the Belarusian prosecutor general for being denied access to her client and made a motion for a medical examination of Protasevich. According to Protasevich's grandparents, on 23 May, a man visited them, introducing himself as a "Roman's first lawyer" and unsuccessfully asking them to sign a document making him a legal representative of Protasevich. On the evening of 27 May, Olenskaya was allowed to meet with Protasevich, but due to a non-disclosure agreement with authorities, she was not allowed to tell journalists his location or legal status.

On 3 June 2021, another video of Protasevich was aired by Belarus state media in which he, apparently under duress, repeated his "confessions". On 14 June, he again appeared in public at a news conference in Minsk and repeated that he felt fine and had not been beaten.

On 25 June, Protasevich and Sapega were transferred to house arrest. Investigators stated the pair had agreed to a plea deal in which they will "expose their accomplices and do their best to compensate for the damage they caused".

Allegedly, Protasevich was provided an internet connection on 7 July 2021, and he created a Twitter account, stating he was staying with Sapega in a private house with a courtyard outside the city and that no one had beaten him. According to Reuters, journalists were "unable to verify whether the account belonged to Protasevich and whether he was drafting his comments unassisted".

On 18 August 2021, his Twitter posts stopped. The last contact his parents had with him was via Sapega by phone in October 2021.

==== Trial and subsequent pardon ====
Protasevich pleaded guilty to the initial charges against him, and his trial opened on 16 February 2023. He was not put into a cage during the first hearing, as is usual with defendants facing a trial, and he said that he was "prepared to face any outcome". When asked about the other activists who had left, Protasevich said that had he not been removed from the Ryanair flight, he would have never returned to Belarus, adding that "no one [of the exiled activists] in their right mind will come back".

On 13 April 2023, prosecutors charged Protasevich with further criminal accusations, including charges of "inciting social hatred", organizing mass riots, and organizing and running extremist groups that called for the overthrow of the Lukashenko government. Protasevich pleaded not guilty and denied the accusations.

On 21 April, the trial heard closing arguments from the prosecution. During the hearing, prosecutor Nataliya Sokolova asked for a sentence of ten years, stating that Protasevich would face a lesser sentence than others who are in exile due to his cooperation after his arrest.

On 26 April, the defence made their closing arguments, and Protasevich delivered his last words of the trial. He admitted to being guilty and claimed to have been used by others in his actions. His defence asked for a reduced sentence, as a lengthy term would "impede [Protasevich] from forming a family".

On 3 May, Protasevich was sentenced to eight years in prison by the Minsk district court on charges including plotting a coup.

On 22 May, it was reported that Protasevich had been pardoned. This was confirmed the next day, and Protasevich was released from custody. He said: "I am incredibly grateful to the country and of course, to the president personally for such a decision" and that he would go to a "quiet place in the countryside for a couple of days" so that he could "take a breather and start to move forward".

==== Release ====
After his release, reports leaked that Protasevich testified against his former girlfriend Sapega in order to receive either a reduced sentence or a presidential pardon. According to news media, Protasevich's testimony against Sapega was handed to the Vladivostok authorities handling her prison transfer case.

In May 2023, Protasevich's mother returned from Poland to Belarus. In an interview with the state-owned Belarusian Telegraph Agency, Protasevich declared that he would definitely not plan to connect his life with politics.

On 13 June 2023, Lukashenko spoke out on why he decided to pardon Protasevich. He told news outlets that he had pardoned Protasevich because "this guy did everything he promised to save his life or to not go to jail ... he confessed that he had done wrong".

However, other opposition figures have come to view Protasevich as a traitor. Andrei Sannikov told The New York Times, "Please don't praise him as a freedom fighter. He is a very dark figure in this whole story. We don't want to hear his name ever again. ... He betrayed the whole democratic movement." Franak Viačorka opined that the case was a "very important story which teaches us how cruel regimes like Lukashenko's are".

On 19 June 2023, Protasevich was assigned the conditions of his pardon, including mandatory reports to a supervisor, reports of his residence, and prohibition from leaving Belarus.

In July, he was removed from the list of terrorists by the Lukashenko government.

Since 2026, Protasevich has been a TV presenter for the state-owned channel Capital TV. In one of his shows, he leaked personal information about the founder of the exiled media outlet Belarusian Investigative Center, Stanislau Ivashkevich. Protasevich revealed Ivashkevich's private phone number and home address in Poland. As a result, YouTube blocked several Belarusian state-owned channels.

== Trivia ==
Belarusian news media accused Protasevich of fighting alongside the Ukrainian Azov Battalion. According to the BBC, the "pro-Lukashenko press in Belarus has portrayed the dissident journalist as an extremist with right-wing sympathies". Protasevich said in 2020 that he had spent a year in Ukraine covering the war in Donbas as a freelance photojournalist. Azov Battalion founder Andriy Biletsky stated of Protasevich, "Roman indeed fought together with Azov and other military units against the occupation of Ukraine. [...] However, his weapon as a journalist wasn't an automatic rifle but the written word", and that he was wounded during the 2015 Shyrokyne standoff.

The Luhansk People's Republic, an unrecognized breakaway polity and participant in the war in Donbas, accused Protasevich of having been a member of the Azov Battalion and having "committed a number of particularly serious crimes, which manifested themselves in the shelling of Donetsk People's Republic settlements, leading to the death and injury of civilians as well as destruction and damage to civilian infrastructure". The Luhansk People's Republic opened a criminal case against Protasevich and asked for his extradition from Belarus. Alexander Lukashenko said he was not opposed to Protasevich being interrogated by investigators from the rebel republics involved in the Donbas war against Ukraine, as long as it happened on Belarusian soil. On 16 June 2021, representatives of the Luhansk People's Republic declared that Protasevich had been "interrogated". The Ukrainian embassy in Minsk subsequently asked Belarusian authorities for an official explanation.
