= Human rights in Belarus =

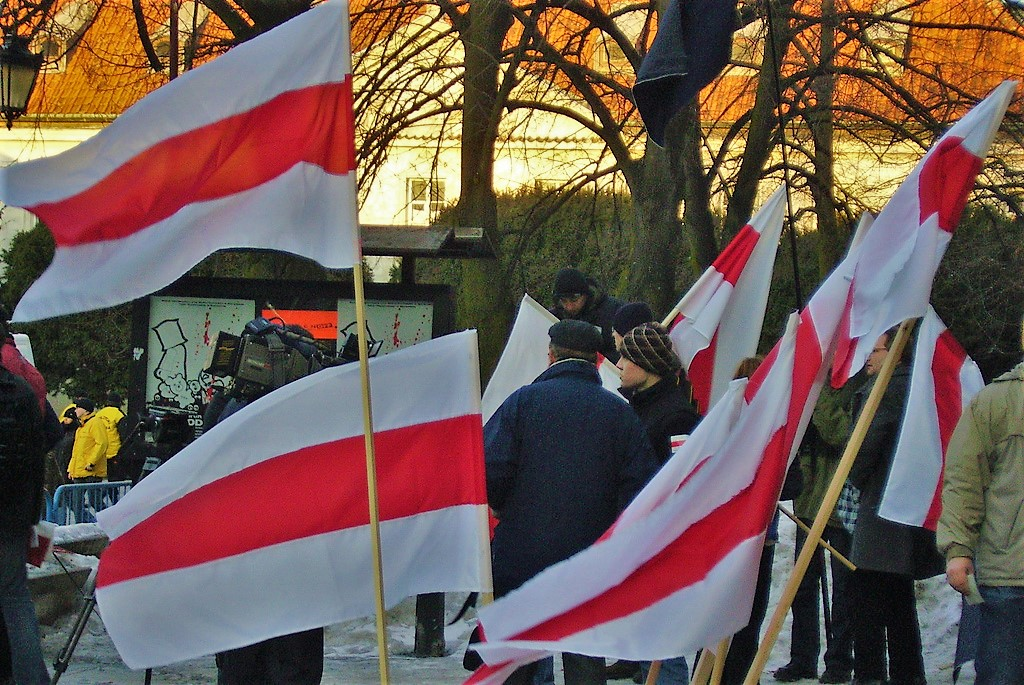
The national flag of 1918 and 1991–1995 has become a symbol of the opposition to the regime of president Alexander Lukashenko.

The government of Belarus is criticized for human rights violations and persecution of non-governmental organisations, independent journalists, national minorities, and opposition politicians. In a testimony to the United States Senate Committee on Foreign Relations, former US Secretary of State Condoleezza Rice labeled Belarus as one of the world's six "outposts of tyranny". In response, the Belarusian government called the assessment "quite far from reality". During the 2020 Belarusian presidential election and 2020 Belarusian protests, the number of political prisoners recognized by Viasna Human Rights Centre rose dramatically to 1,144 as of 9 February 2026. Several people died after the use of unlawful and abusive force (including firearms) by law enforcement officials while suppressing protests. According to Amnesty International, the authorities did not investigate violations during protests, but instead harassed those who challenged their version of events. In July 2021, the authorities launched a campaign against the remaining non-governmental organizations, liquidating at least 270 of them by October, including all previously registered human rights organizations in the country.

President Alexander Lukashenko has described himself as having an "authoritarian ruling style". Western countries have described Belarus under Lukashenko as "Europe's last dictatorship"; the government has accused the same Western powers of attempting a regime change. The Council of Europe has barred Belarus from membership since 1997 for undemocratic voting and irregularities during elections in the November 1996 constitutional referendum and parliament by-elections.

Dozens of Belarusian government officials responsible for political repressions, forced disappearances, propaganda, and electoral fraud have been subject to personal sanctions by the United States of America and the European Union.

== Electoral process ==
The new flag of Belarus introduced by Alexander Lukashenko following a controversial referendum in 1995

As of 2025, no other presidential or parliamentary election or referendum was held in Belarus since then which has been accepted as free and fair by the OSCE, the United Nations, the European Union or the United States. Senior officials responsible for organizing elections, including the head of the Central Elections Commission, Lydia Yermoshina, were subject to international sanctions for electoral fraud:

Lukashenko's official election results at presidential elections
10 July 1994	9 September 2001	19 March 2006	19 December 2010	11 October 2015	9 August 2020	26 January 2025
80.61%	77.39%	84.44%	80.44%	84.14%	81.04%	87.48%

=== December 2010 election ===
The presidential elections of 2010 were followed by opposition protests and its violent crackdown by the police. A group of protesters tried to storm a principal government building, smashing windows and doors before riot police pushed them back. After attack of principal building protesters were violently suppressed. Several hundreds of activists, including several presidential candidates, were arrested, beaten and tortured by the police and the Belarusian KGB.

Lukashenko criticized the protesters, accusing them of "banditry".

Police violence during the protests and the overall conduction of the election caused a wave of harsh criticism from the U.S. and the EU. More than 200 propagandists, state security officers, central election committee staff and other officials were included in sanctions lists of the European Union: they were banned from entering the EU and their assets in the EU, if any, were to be frozen.

=== August 2020 election ===
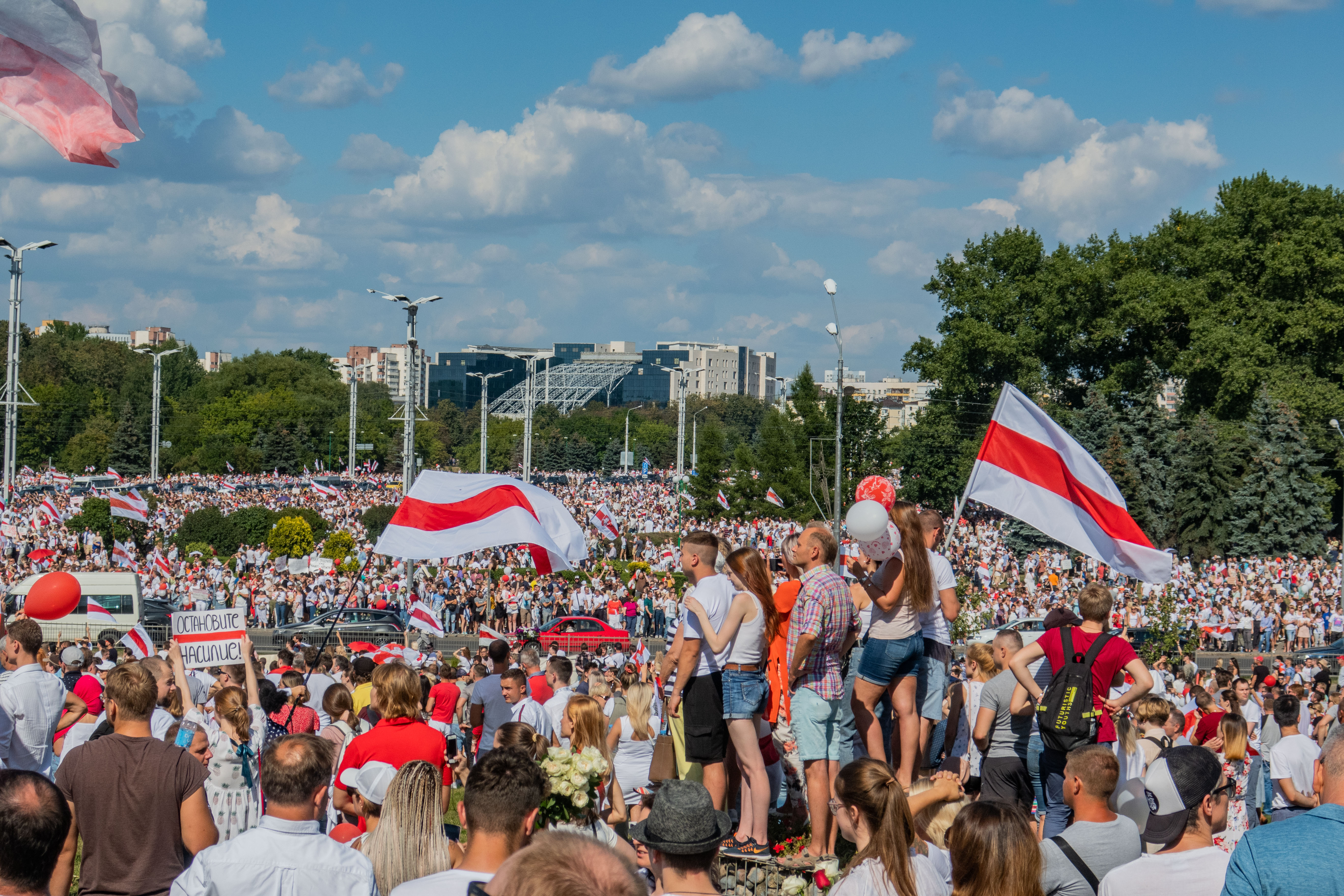
2020 Belarusian protests

In June 2020, the Amnesty International documented clampdown on human rights, including the rights to freedom of expression and peaceful assembly and association, ahead of presidential elections scheduled for 9 August 2020. The organization reported politically motivated prosecutions, intimidation, harassment and reprisals against opposition candidates and their supporters. The Belarusian authorities targeted and intimidated civil society activists and independent media. Two politicians, Syarhei Tsikhanouski and Viktar Babaryka, were jailed and faced politically motivated criminal proceedings. Hundreds of peaceful protesters, including their supporters, were arbitrarily arrested and heavily fined or held in "administrative detention". On 14 August 2020, the European Union imposed sanctions on individual Belarusian officials, after reports of the systematic abuse and torture of Belarusians in a violent crackdown on protesters. The Belarusian security forces beat and detained peaceful protesters, who participated in demonstrations against the official election outcome. On 17 March 2023, the UN High Commissioner for Human Rights issued a report according to which there were "sufficient grounds to believe that systematic, widespread and gross human rights violations have been and are being committed in Belarus", and "some of the violations may also amount to crimes against humanity". The report cited violations including excessive use of force, torture and arbitrary arrests as part of a "campaign of violence and repression" against protesters opposing the government. Lukashenko dismissed the accusations and blamed foreign powers for supporting the protesters.

== Freedoms ==
=== Freedom of the press ===
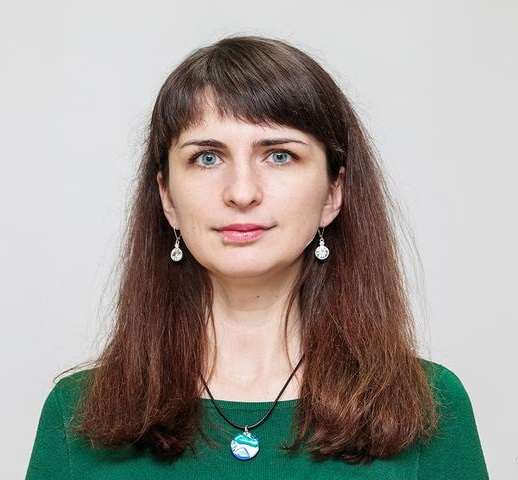
Katsiaryna Barysevich is a staff correspondent for the independent news site Tut.By. She was arrested on November 2020.

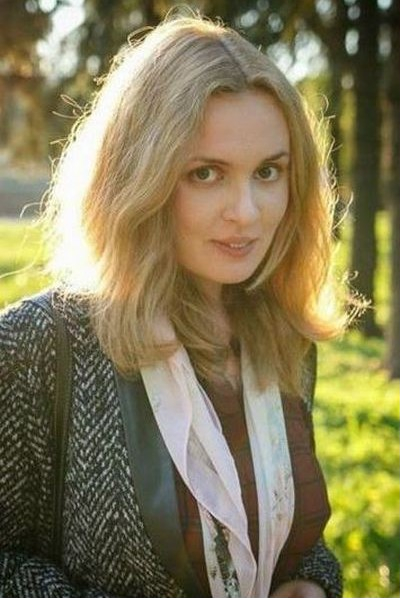
Belsat TV journalist Katsyaryna Andreeva was sentenced to 8 years in prison in 2022.

Since the 2000s, Reporters Without Borders have been ranking Belarus below all other European countries in its Press Freedom Index.

Freedom House has rated Belarus as "not free" in all of its global surveys since 1998, "Freedom in the World"; the Lukashenko government curtails press freedom, the organization says. State media are subordinate to the president. Harassment and censorship of independent media are routine.

Under the authoritarian president Alexander Lukashenko, journalists like Iryna Khalip, Natalya Radina, and Pavel Sheremet have been arrested for their work. Independent printed media like Nasha Niva have been excluded from state distribution networks.

In February 2021, two Belsat TV journalists Katsyaryna Andreeva and Darya Chultsova were imprisoned for two years for streaming during anti-Lukashenko protests in Minsk.

In May 2021, top news site tut.by which was read by circa 40% of internet users in Belarus was blocked and several its journalists were detained. In July 2021, Nasha Niva, a news site, was blocked with simultaneous detention of the editors took place. Editorial office of Radio Free Europe/Radio Liberty in Minsk was searched with doors being broke, homes of several its journalists were also searched. Coverage of these attacks on independent media by state-run TV channels is considered to be an attempt to intimidate people.

According to Current Time TV, state-run media made false accusations about the activities of journalists and invented fake evidences of their guilt without any trial. Amnesty International condemned attack on NGOs by Belarusian authorities.

In July 2021, registrations of Belarusian Association of Journalists, Press Club Belarus and Belarusian branch of writers' PEN center were revoked as a part of attack on NGOs (see #Pressure on NGOs section).

=== Freedom of religion ===
Jews are not the only minority who are alleged to have had their human rights violated in Belarus. On 25 March 2004, the Associated Press reported that a ban exists on home worship in the country and that members of four Protestant churches had recently asked the government to repeal a 2002 law which forbade them worshipping from their own homes, although they were members of legally registered religions. The Christian Post reported in a 21 April 2005 article that non-denominational, charismatic churches were greatly affected by the law, since none of these churches own buildings. Protestant organizations have also complained of censorship because of the ban on importing literature without approval by government officials.

According to Forum 18, textbooks widely used in Belarusian schools (as of 2002) contain anti-religious views similar to those taught in the USSR:

Religion does not teach a believer to strive to lead a dignified life, to fight for his freedom or against evil and oppression. This is all supposed to be performed for him by supernatural forces, above all, god. All that is left for the believer to do is to be his pathetic petitioner, to behave as a pauper or slave...Religion's promises to give a person everything that he seeks in it are but illusion and deception."

The organization also reported that charismatic Protestant churches (such as Full Gospel) and Greek Catholic and independent Orthodox churches (such as those unaffiliated with the Russian Orthodox Church) have encountered difficulty in registering churches.

In 2003, Protestant groups accused the government of Belarus of waging a smear campaign against them, telling Poland's Catholic information agency KAI that they had been accused of being Western spies and conducting human sacrifice. Charter 97 reported in July 2004 that Baptists who celebrated Easter with patients at a hospital in Mazyr were fined and threatened with confiscation of their property.

Only 4,000 Muslims live in Belarus, mostly ethnic Lipka Tatars who are the descendants of immigrants and prisoners in the 11th and 12th centuries. The administration for Muslims in the country, which was abolished in 1939, was re-established in 1994.

However, Ahmadiyya Muslims (commonly regarded as a non-violent sect) are banned from practicing their faith openly in Belarus, and have a similar status to groups like Scientology and Aum Shinrikyo. There have been no major reports of religious persecution of the Muslim community; however, because of the situation in Chechnya and neighboring Russia concerns have been expressed by Belarusian Muslims that they may become increasingly vulnerable.

These fears were heightened on 16 September 2005 when a bomb was detonated outside a bus stop, injuring two people. On 23 September a bomb was exploded outside a restaurant, wounding nearly 40 people. Muslims were not suspected in the latter attack, which was labeled "hooliganism".

In 2020, the government pressed on major religious groups after they condemned violence during the mass protests. On 26 August 2020, Belarusian riot police OMON blocked protesters and random believers in a Roman Catholic church in Minsk for several hours. The leader of the Belarusian Orthodox Church Metropolitan Paul was forced to resign after criticism of the police and authorities; his changer Veniamin was considered to be a much more comfortable figure for Lukashenko. The leader of the Roman Catholic church in Belarus Tadevuš Kandrusievič was banned from returning to Belarus from Poland for several months and was forced to resign soon after the return.

In 2021, the authorities organized the "All-Belarus prayer" convincing all confessions to make a prayer. Alexander Lukashenko tried to stop the performance of the religious song "The Almighty God" (Belarusian: Магутны Божа) warning Catholic priests not to perform it. In 2021, an official newspaper of Minsk Region published a cartoon depicting Roman Catholic priests as Nazis wearing swastika instead of crosses.

In 2023, Freedom House rated Belarus' religious freedom as 1 out of 4.

=== Freedom of association ===
The constitutional right of freedom of associations is not always implemented in practice. In 2013, Amnesty International characterized Belarusian legislation on registration of NGOs as "over-prescriptive". Ministry of Justice of Belarus who is responsible for the registration of new organizations uses double standards for commercial and other non-governmental organizations, including political parties. The former need only a declaration to start operations, the latter have to get a permission. Political associations, including parties, however, had difficulties to get a permission. The last new party was registered in Belarus in 2000, because later the ministry denied to register new parties for different reasons. Belarusian Christian Democracy made 7 attempts to register, Party of freedom and progress — 4 attempts; People's Hramada party was also prevented from registration. The ministry justified all these cases by the reasons that are thought to be artificial and flimsy. For example, the ministry refused to register a local branch of BPF Party in Hrodna Region because of "incorrect line spacing" in the documents. During another attempt to register this branch, the ministry requested the additional documents that are not mentioned in the law. One of the refusals by the Belarusian Christian Democracy cited lack of home or work phones information for some of the party founders. Another refusal was based on a statement in the party's charter that its members should be "supporters of a Christian worldview". Amnesty International reported cases of pressure to withdraw signatures needed to register a political party by the local authorities and managers (in state organizations). Several activists (including Zmitser Dashkevich) were imprisoned for "the activity of unregistered associations".

According to the Centre for Legal Transformation, the ministry is also actively refusing to register non-governmental organizations. In 2009, the ministry declared that the registration process was simplified, but the legal experts of political parties doubted this statement claiming that only insignificant issues were affected. In 2012, the ministry started the procedure of suspension of an NGO citing the wrong capital letter on a stamp ("Dobraya Volya" instead of "Dobraya volya") as one of the reasons; the NGO was soon suspended. In 2011 and 2013, the ministry refused to register LGBT organizations; therefore Belarus had no LGBT associations. Human rights organizations also fail to register, so the long-established Belarusian Helsinki Committee is the only registered organization in this area on the national level.

In July and August 2021, Belarusian Ministry of justice started the procedure of closure of several major NGOs, including Belarusian Popular Front, the oldest continuously operating organization in Belarus (founded in 1988, registered in 1991), Belarusian Association of Journalists, Belarusian PEN centre. The liquidation of the oldest green group in Belarus, Ecohome (Executive Director Marina Dubina), was condemned by 46 members of Aarhus Convention and by the European ECO Forum. The remaining members of the convention voted to give the Belarusian government a chance to cancel the liquidation before 1 December 2021, threatening to suspend its membership otherwise.

=== Freedom of speech ===
Belarusian government uses article 130 of the criminal code ("Inciting other social hatred") to combat political opponents who criticize the government or submit negative comments on social media and public chats. As of 2024, 650 people were convicted using this article. Artist Ales Pushkin (later died in prison) was prosecuted for his painting under this article. In 2025, at least 133 people were convicted under this article.

In April 2025, after meeting with Pakistani Prime Minister Shehbaz Sharif in Minsk, Belarusian President Alexander Lukashenko announced a plan to open Belarus to 150,000 migrant workers from Pakistan. Belarusian authorities have cracked down on online opponents of Pakistani immigration to Belarus and arrested the most vocal critics of Lukashenko's immigration policies.

== Judicial system ==
Belarusian judicial system is characterized by the high conviction rate: in 2020, 99.7% of criminal cases resulted in conviction and only 0.3% — in acquittance. This rate is stable for several years. The judicial system is especially severe to people expressing their views: among prosecuted people are journalists, civil activists, people who make political comments and jokes on social networks and put emojis there. Among the most controversial "crimes" are white socks with a red stripe, white and red hair, 70 people arrested in Brest for dancing (some of them were sentenced to two years of prison). Opposition leader also experience harsh treatment in the courthouses which is sometimes compared with the Stalinist trials.

=== Legislation ===
Belarusian authorities have legislated "anti-extremism" laws, which allow them to "systematically persecute political opponents". Between 2020 and 2024, 16,000 crimes "of an extremist nature" were registered by the Belarusian government, according to the prosecutor general, and between 2021-2026 more than 1000 political prisoners had been charged with the "purposefully broad and vague" crime of "extremism". During 2026, as of April, Belarusian authorities designated 24 organizations as "extremist formations", these consist of human rights organizations, both national and international, and the European Humanities University. Additionally, the Viasna Human Rights Center, the Belarusian Association of Journalists and the Union of Belarusian Mothers antiwar movement were all designated "extremist formations" and any assistance offered them was criminalized as "aiding extremism". Other actions regularly prosecuted under "anti-extremism" laws include donation to Ukrainian forces or the Kalinousky regiment of Belarusian volunteer combatants, criticism of the Russian military online, antiwar activism and speech and engagement with "extremist" content online.

Additionally, the newly amended citizenship law dictates the loss of Belarusian citizenship over participation in "extremist activities" or "otherwise harming national security".

On 4 September 2023, Lukashenko signed a decree according to which Belarusian citizens living abroad would not be able to renew their personal documents, including passports, outside of Belarus, making it difficult to sell real estate or other assets outside of Belarus.

=== Capital punishment ===
Europe holds the greatest concentration of abolitionist states (blue). Map current as of 2017 Abolished for all crimes Retains death penalty

Belarus is the only European country that continues to use capital punishment. The U.S. and Belarus were the only two of the 56 member states of the Organization for Security and Cooperation in Europe to have carried out executions during 2011.

=== Political dissidents and prisoners ===
In December 2010, Belarusian special security forces attacked demonstrators, beat and injured many activists with batons and arrested more than 600 people after a rally in central Minsk to protest the outcome of elections widely seen by Western observers as fraudulent. In their joint statement, Hillary Clinton and Baroness Ashton called for the immediate release of the protesters (including at least seven opposition presidential candidates) and strongly condemned what they termed the "disproportionate" use of force against demonstrators.

Belarus has come under attack from Amnesty International for its treatment of political prisoners, including those from the youth wing of the Belarusian Popular Front (a pro-democracy party). In a report dated 26 April 2005 Amnesty criticised Belarus for its treatment of dissidents, including a woman imprisoned for publishing a satirical poem. Another political prisoner who has been in prison for four years (June 2001 – August 2005) is Yury Bandazhevsky, a scientist who was jailed on accusations on taking bribes from students' parents, although Amnesty International has stated on their website "His conviction was widely believed to be related to his scientific research into the Chernobyl catastrophe and his open criticism of the official response to the Chernobyl nuclear reactor disaster on people living in the region of Gomel.".

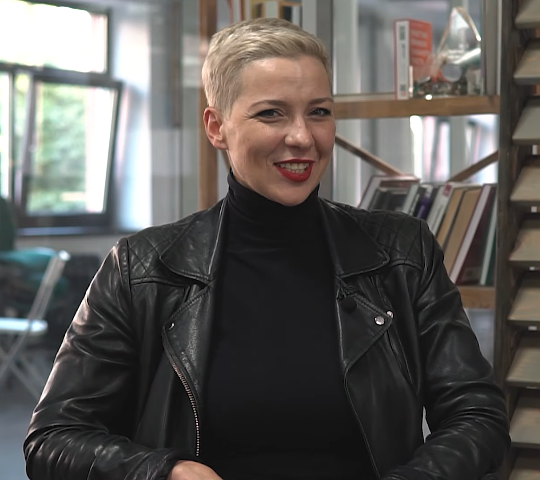
Maria Kalesnikava was sentenced to 11 years in prison for her political activities in September 2021

The United States Department of State issued a report on 14 April 2005 expressing concern about the disappearance (and possible execution) of the political activists Yury Zacharanka, Viktar Hanchar and Anatol Krasouski in 1999 and the journalist Dzmitry Zavadski in 2000, and continuing incidents of arrest and detention without trial. The State Department has also appealed to Belarus to provide information publicly about individuals who were executed.

A report dated 31 August 2005 from Amnesty USA claimed that, in addition to the Polish minority crisis earlier that year, three Georgians from the youth movement Kmara were detained while visiting Belarus. The activists were detained on 24 August with Uladimir Kobets, from Zubr (a Belarusian opposition movement). According to the report, he was released after two hours after being told that the police operation was directed at "persons from the Caucasus".

The following activists and political leaders have been declared political prisoners at different times:

- Ales Bialiatski, Vice President of International Federation for Human Rights and head of Viasna Human Rights Centre
- Mikola Statkevich
- Uladzimir Nyaklyayew
- Andrei Sannikov
- Paval Sieviaryniets
- Zmicier Dashkievich
- Andrei Kim
- Natalya Radina
- Iryna Khalip
- Alyaksandr Kazulin
- Mikalay Autukhovich
- Tsimafei Dranchuk
- Syarhei Parsyukevich
- Eduard Palčys

In 2017, the Viasna Human Rights Centre listed two political prisoners detained in Belarus, down from 11 in 2016.

As of 3 July 2021, number of political prisoners recognized by Viasna rose to 529; as of 22 February 2022 — to 1,078; as of 9 February 2026 – to 1,144. In 2023, some political prisoners were released after completing their sentences, however a number of them had been rearrested. Those who had not been rearrested reported that their prison conditions had been torturous and that they had difficulty reintegrating into Belarusan society.

In July 2024, Belarus has freed five political prisoners, including opposition figure Rygor Kastusev, in a rare amnesty amidst continued repression since the disputed 2020 presidential election. While exiled opposition leader Svetlana Tikhanovskaya welcomed the releases, she emphasized the ongoing plight of over 1,400 remaining political prisoners, many in critical health. Human rights activists accuse Belarusian authorities of imposing harsh conditions, such as public admissions of guilt, for releasing political prisoners, despite promises to free some detainees from the 2020 protests.

In 2025, Viasna human rights organization stated that 1,254 people were convicted in politically motivated criminal cases in 2025 alone, including at least 306 people sentenced to imprisonement, at least 42 people – to the restriction of freedom in an open penal facilities (khimiya), and at least 555 people – to the home confinement.

Number of political prisoners died behind bars rose to 9 in 2025 (Vitold Ashurak, Ihar Lednik, Ales Pushkin and 6 other people).

=== Extrajudicial use of judiciary ===
As noted in the 2008 U.S. Department of State Report, while the Belarus Constitution provides for the separation of powers, an independent judiciary and impartial courts (Articles 6 and 60), the government ignores these provisions when it suits its immediate needs; corruption, inefficiency and political interference are prevalent in the judiciary; the government convicts individuals on false and politically motivated charges, and executive and local authorities dictate the outcomes of trials; the judiciary branch lacks independence, and trial outcomes are usually predetermined; judges depend on executive-branch officials for housing; and the criminal-justice system is used as an instrument to silence human-rights defenders through politically motivated arrests, detention, lack of due process and closed political trials.

Although Article 25 of the Belarus Constitution prohibits the use of torture, in practice Belarus tortures and mistreats detainees; while Article 26 provides for the presumption of innocence, defendants often must prove their innocence; while Article 25 prohibits arbitrary arrest, detention and imprisonment, Lukashenko's regime conducts arbitrary arrests, detention and imprisonment of individuals for political reasons; while Article 210(1) of the Criminal Procedure Code provides that a search warrant must be obtained before any searches, in practice authorities search residences and offices for political reasons; while Article 43 of the Criminal Procedure Code gives defendants the right to attend proceedings, confront witnesses, and present evidence on their own behalf, in practice these rights are disregarded. Prosecutors are not independent, and that lack of independence renders due-process protections meaningless; prosecutor authority over the accused is "excessive and imbalanced".

"Arbitrary arrests, detentions, and imprisonment of citizens for political reasons, criticizing officials, or for participating in demonstrations also continued. Some court trials were conducted behind closed doors without the presence of independent observers. The judiciary branch lacked independence and trial outcomes usually were predetermined".

The section of the Report entitled "Arbitrary Arrest or Detention" noted that although "the [Belarusian] law limits arbitrary detention ...the government did not respect these limits in practice [and] authorities continued to arrest individuals for political reasons". It further notes that during 2008 "Impunity remained a serious problem"; "Police frequently detained and arrested individuals without a warrant"; "authorities arbitrarily detained or arrested scores of individuals, including opposition figures and members of the independent media, for reasons that were widely considered to be politically motivated".

The section titled "Denial of Fair Public Trial" noted: "The constitution provides for an independent judiciary; however, the government did not respect judicial independence in practice. Corruption, inefficiency, and political interference were prevalent in the judiciary. There was evidence that prosecutors and courts convicted individuals on false and politically motivated charges, and that executive and local authorities dictated the outcomes of trials".

"[Belarusian] judges depended on executive branch officials for personal housing".

"A 2006 report by the UN special rapporteur on Belarus described the authority of prosecutors as "excessive and imbalanced" and noted "an imbalance of power between the prosecution and the defense".

"defense lawyers cannot examine investigation files, be present during investigations, or examine evidence against defendants until a prosecutor formally brought the case to court";

"lawyers found it difficult to call some evidence into question because technical expertise was under the control of the prosecutor's office";

These imbalances of power intensified at the beginning of the year "especially in relation to politically motivated criminal and administrative cases".

"[b]y presidential decree all lawyers are subordinate to the Ministry of Justice [and] the law prohibits attorneys from private practice".

"[t]he law provides for the presumption of innocence; however, in practice defendants frequently had to prove their innocence;

" the law also provides for public trials; in practice, this was frequently disregarded; "defendants have the right to attend proceedings, confront witnesses, and present evidence on their own behalf; however, in practice these rights were not always respected";

"courts often allowed information obtained from forced interrogations to be used against defendants".

International documents reflect that the Belarusian courts that are subject to an authoritarian executive apparatus, routinely disregard the rule of law and exist to rubber-stamp decisions made outside the courtroom; this is tantamount to the de facto non-existence of courts as impartial judicial forums. The "law" in Belarus is not mandatory, but optional and subject to discretion. Nominal "law" which, in practice, is not binding is tantamount to the non-existence of law.

=== Dealing with demonstrators and planned construction of concentration camps ===
Several violations of human rights were reported after the beginning of 2020 Belarusian protests. According to Amnesty International, human rights experts of the United Nations documented 450 evidences of torture, cruel treatment, humiliation, sexual abuse, restricted access to water, food, medical aid and hygiene products. Ban of contacts with lawyers and relatives became a common practice for the arrested. Belarusian authorities acknowledged the receipt of nearly 900 complaints, but no criminal cases were initiated. The authorities instead increased the pressure on human rights activists.

In January 2021, an audio recording was released in which the commander of internal troops and deputy interior minister of Belarus Mikalai Karpiankou tells security forces that they can cripple, maim and kill protesters in order to make them understand their actions. This, he says, is justified because anyone who takes to the streets is participating in a kind of guerrilla warfare. In addition, he discussed the establishment of camps, surrounded by barbed wire, where protesters will be detained until the situation calms down. A spokeswoman for the Interior Ministry stamped the audio file as a fake. However, a phonoscopic examination of the audio recording confirmed that the voice on the recording belongs to Karpiankou. The Organization for Security and Cooperation in Europe expressed its concern about the remarks. According to Radio Free Europe/Radio Liberty, such a camp was indeed used near the town of Slutsk in the days from 13 to 15 August 2020. Many of those detained there are said to have been brought from the Okrestina prison in Minsk.

Belarusian authorities published a number of videos with detained people confessing and repenting on camera; these video were presumably made under duress. Roman Protasevich looked battered on his confession video and had cuts or bruisings on his wrists. It was assumed that Roman's girlfriend Sofia Sapega was arrested only to put pressure on him. Amnesty International's Eastern Europe and Central Asia Director Marie Struthers condemned the forced confession of Protasevich and claimed that it was the result of ill-treatment. It was reported that pro-Lukashenko journalist of state-owned Sovetskaya Belorussiya – Belarus' Segodnya newspaper Lyudmila Gladkaya interrogated the arrested people together with police officers in several confession videos.

In 2020, Belarusian KGB started to put Belarusian citizens on the list of terrorists (without court's decision). The first two were Nexta Telegram channel founders Stepan Putilo and Roman Protasevich. As of May 2021, the number of Belarusian people in the list was 37, including a Belarusian-American Yuras Zyankovich. Terrorism can be punishable by death penalty in Belarus, but at least some of the people in the list weren't accused of the appropriate Criminal Code article.

On 1 October 2021, general and member of the lower chamber of the Belarusian parliament Oleg Belokonev called to murder 20–100 opposition activists as a revenge for deaths of state security officials.

=== Pressure on lawyers ===
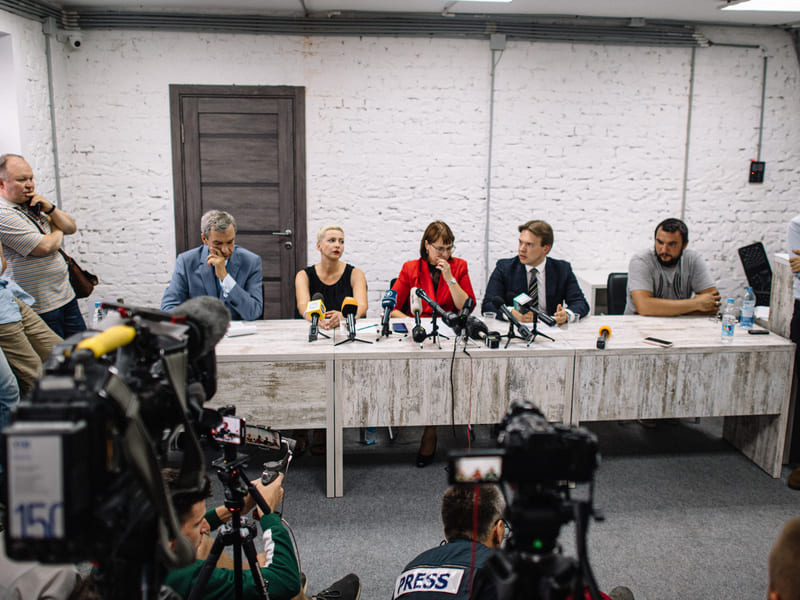
Maxim Znak, Olga Kovalkova, and Maria Kolesnikova during the first press conference of the Coordination Council of Belarus

After the start of 2020 Belarusian protests, a number of lawyers (advocates) who defended opposition activists were disbarred (deprived of the advocate status) by the commission of the Ministry of justice: Alexander Pylchenko (lawyer of Viktar Babaryka and Maria Kalesnikava), Yuliya Levanchuk, Lyudmila Kazak (lawyer of Maria Kalesnikava), Sergey Zikracki (lawyer of Katsyaryna Andreeva). At least three other lawyers were disbarred after arrests during protests or comments in the social networks. This practice was criticized as violation of independence of the legal profession. Official reasons of disbarment included "low level of knowledge" and "lack of qualification". Opposition activists and lawyers Maxim Znak and Illia Salei (the latter was a former lawyer of Maria Kalesnikava) were arrested in September 2020 and recognized as prisoners of conscience by the Amnesty International. Head of Belarusian Republican Bar Association and member of the Belarusian parliament Viktar Čajčyc fully supported the authorities and called lawyers "not to go to politics". On 2 March 2021, the American Bar Association expressed "deep concern about the escalating attacks on the rule of law and the independence of the legal profession in Belarus". In May 2021, ABA's Center for human rights analysed 4 cases of disbarment in Belarus and concluded that these acts represented intimidation, hindrance, harassment, improper interference with lawyers' functions and undermined the rule of law in Belarus.

In May 2021, Belarusian parliament amended the laws on the legal profession (law 113-Z issued on 27 May 2021 signed by Lukashenko on 28 May and came into effect on 30 May). The amendments banned individual advocates and law firms (bureaus), making the state-regulated judicial consultations the only form of provision of advocate services. Ministry of justice was given the right to approve the candidates to presidiums of local bar associations and their heads. It was also noted that one of the amendments could abolish free ("for 1 rubel") legal help to the arrested protesters. The amendments were highly criticized by independent lawyers, human rights activists and legal experts. Jurist Sergey Gasoyan claimed that the amendments "question the existence of advocacy as an institution that defends laws, rights and interests of citizens". The amendments were compared with the abolishment of independent advocacy. The law wasn't put up for public discussion, but at least 4,000 people signed the petition against the amendments.

Lawyers of opposition figures reported several violations of law that prevented them to perform their duties. In December 2020, a lawyer was prohibited to be present at a search in his client's home. Lawyer of Roman Protasevich couldn't see her client for 4 days after his detention in Minsk airport and later reported that she couldn't see him for a week. Former investigator Yevgeny Yushkevich also wasn't allowed to meet his lawyer for the first 4 days after detention. On 28 April 2021, state-owned ONT TV published a part of private conversation between Sergei Tikhanovsky and his lawyer Natallia Mackevich who later filed a complaint with the Attorney General about the violation of attorney privilege.

=== Pressure on NGOs ===
On 14 July 2021, Belarusian authorities launched an attack on Belarus-based non-governmental organizations (NGOs) which resulted in dissolution of nearly 40 of them by the Ministry of justice and detention of several activists. This campaign was described as "a total purge on civil society". It was noticed that an attack on NGOs was launched immediately after meeting of Lukashenko and Vladimir Putin.

Dissolved NGOs included "Imena" social and healthcare crowdfunding platform, several human rights activists groups (Center for legal transformation, Human Constanta, Youth Labor Rights, Gender Answer and others), journalists organizations (Belarusian Association of Journalists and Press Club Belarus), several cultural organizations including "Mova Nanova" Belarusian language courses and "Vedanta vada" organization promoting Indian culture and religion, Belarusian branch of writers' PEN center, IPM business school Belarusian PEN center headed by the Nobel Prize laureate Svetlana Alexievich was dissolved by order of Supreme Court of Belarus on 9 August 2021.

On 23 July 2021, Belarusian Helsinki Committee, Barys Zvozskau Belarusian Human Rights House, Viasna Human Rights Centre and 3 other human rights activists organizations issued a statement to "stop demolition of Belarus's civil society", claiming violations of the international obligations of Belarus in the field of freedom of association and expression. On 24 September 2021, Supreme Court of Belarus liquidated the World Association of Belarusians which worked with the Belarusian diaspora organizations.

The authorities also dissolved the major union of entrepreneurs "Perspektiva" and eliminated the Union of Belarusian Writers which was thought to be a revenge of Lukashenko for the writers' independent position.

On 1 October 2021, the Belarusian Helsinki Committee was forcibly liquidated by the Supreme Court. The court used materials of some unspecified criminal case (probably with no verdict passed so far) to dissolute the BHC. BHC was the pre-last registered human rights group in Belarus (the last one is Pravovaya iniciativa — The Legal Initiative, which is under of liquidation too).

In December 2021, the Belarus Solidarity Foundation (BYSOL), a non-profit organization aimed at raising funds to provide financial aid to victims of repression in Belarus, was declared to be "extremist".

State repression following Belarus's 2020 protests significantly accelerated the digitalization of its non-governmental organizations. Online tools became crucial, enabling participation for those unable to attend in-person meetings due to safety, distance, or physical constraints. Despite staff and volunteer dispersal, many Belarusian NGOs continue operating by leveraging technology. For example, after being eliminated by authorities, the ecological NGO "Ecohome" relocated its office to Vilnius and digitized its activities. This allowed them to continue monitoring air quality and radiation via a volunteer network (communicating through Telegram chats) and provide online ecological rights consultations. Their move and digitalization were primarily driven by the need to escape persecution and facilitate cross-border engagement.

Belarusian NGOs face danger because the authoritarian regime, led by A. Lukashenka, labels independent groups as threats to "electoral revolution," alleging foreign financing. Signals from Lukashenka and figures like ex-Foreign Minister U. Makiej initiated a "verification" campaign, escalating systematic repression. This 'institutional uncertainty' compels the regime to suppress perceived horizontal threats. Consequently, approximately 965 NGOs closed or are being eliminated.

=== Pressure on academics and scientists ===
Following the 2020 presidential election and subsequent protests, Belarusian authorities intensified pressure on the academic and scientific community. Academics, university staff, and students who publicly opposed violence or participated in peaceful demonstrations faced administrative and criminal sanctions, including dismissals, expulsions, and arrests.

In August 2020, more than 1,500 Belarusian academics signed the Appeal of Belarusian Academics Against Violence, calling for an end to violence and respect for human rights. Similar initiatives included the Appeal Against Repressions and the Video Appeal of Belarusian Scientists, in which scientists and educators spoke out against state violence, political repression, and the suppression of intellectual freedom. Participants in these appeals were subject to pressure from university administrations and law enforcement, including warnings, interrogations, and threats of dismissal. Universities and research institutes dismissed employees for expressing civic positions or participating in protests. Students who took part in demonstrations were expelled.

The repression also affected prominent figures in the scientific community. For example, chemist and science journalist Siarhei Besarab did not have his contract renewed at the National Academy of Sciences of Belarus after his participation as an expert in the case of Stsiapan Latypau, where he publicly refuted allegations made against the defendant. Besarab later faced additional pressure and was forced to leave the country. Philologists Alexander Lukashanets and Sergei Garanin, who participated in the Video Appeal of Belarusian Scientists, also experienced professional and administrative consequences for their civic stance.

The ongoing pressure on academics and scientists has contributed to a significant outflow of specialists from the country and has negatively affected academic freedom, research collaboration, and the overall state of science and education in Belarus.

== Labour relations ==
The situation for trade unions and their members in the region has been criticized by Amnesty UK, with allegations that authorities have interfered in trade-union elections and that independent trade-union leaders have been dismissed from their positions.

In 2021, International Trade Union Confederation listed Belarus among top 10 worst countries for working people in the world (Global Rights Index). Reasons for worsening of the situation included state repression of independent union activity, arbitrary arrests, severe cases of no or restricted access to justice. Belarus have already been among top 10 worst countries in Global Rights Index in 2015 and 2016.

In June 2021, the International Labour Organization criticized the "blatant violation of international labour standards in Belarus" during the annual International Labour Conference.

In recent years, trades unions in the country have been subject to a variety of restrictions, including:

Unregistered union ban

Beginning in 1999, all previously registered trade unions had to re-register and provide the official address of the headquarters (which often includes a business address). A letter from the management is also required, confirming the address (making the fate of the trade union dependent on the management). Any organization which fails to do so is banned and dissolved.

In 2021, International Trade Union Confederation claimed that the government "continued to deny registration to independent unions".

High minimum-membership requirement

In a measure which has also reportedly been used against Jewish human-rights organizations, the government announced that any new trade union must contain a minimum of 500 members for it to be recognized. This makes it difficult for new unions to be established.

Systematic interference

The International Labour Organization's governing body issued a report in March 2001 complaining of systematic interference in trade union activities, including harassment and attacks on union assets. Workers who are members of independent trade unions in Belarus have, according to Unison, been arrested for distributing pamphlets and other literature and have faced losing their jobs.

Belarusian workers are systematically intimidated to leave independent trade unions, members of student independent unions are expelled from universities. In 2021, the leader of the independent REP trade union was forced to leave Belarus after the office was raided by the police.

In 2014, Lukashenko announced the introduction of new law that will prohibit kolkhoz workers (around 9% of total work force) from leaving their jobs at will – change of job and living location will require permission from governors. The law was compared with serfdom by Lukashenko himself. Similar regulations were introduced for the forest industry in 2012.

During 2020 Belarusian protests, several companies attempted to start a strike, but was met with brutal repression. In 2021, three employees of Byelorussian Steel Works were imprisoned for attempting to organize a strike.

On 28 May 2021 a law 114-Z was published that changed the Belarusian Labour code. It enabled to fire employees who served an arrest and who called to strike. A number of reasons for temporarily suspension from work including "calling to stop performing other employees' duties without good reason" were also added. Companies having any "hazardous production facilities" became completely prohibited to strike. Political slogans during strikes became banned entirely. WSWS characterized these amendments as making firing employees much easier.

During 2020 Belarusian protests, offices of trade unions were raided by the police which forced unions to transfer personal information of the union members to the police. Cases of abduction of union representatives on their way to work were reported. In 2021, International Trade Union Confederation claimed that new government regulations can be seen as a "de facto ban on all public assemblies and strikes for [trade] unions".

In September 2021, several workers of Grodno Azot, Belarusian Railway and Byelorussian Steel Works were detained. Their detention was connected with the threat of Alexander Lukashenko that workers who reveal the ways of bypassing the sanctions would be put in jail for a long time. According to Nasha Niva, at least two of the detained persons were charged with high treason (article 356 of the Criminal Code of Belarus).

Forced labour

Belarusian government is widely using forced labour in penal colonies in violation of the obligations assumed under conventions aimed at abolition of forced labour. In 2023, Walk Free human rights group estimated that 107,000 people in Belarus lived in modern slavery experiencing forced labour or forced marriage, and called the Belarusian government to immediately end state-imposed forced labour in prisons, administrative detention and "labour therapy" centres. Until 2022, forced labour of prisoners was used to produce furniture and other stuff for IKEA. Furniture made by prisoners was also sold in Belarusian stores. According to Disclose investigative journalist group, at least 10 of Belarusian IKEA suppliers had ties with penal colonies. Political prisoners are also forced to work in penal colonies alongside other inmates. In 2021, 94 political prisoners were forced to work in IK-15 penal colony alone, which was one of the subcontractors of IKEA suppliers. Since 2022, prisoners (including political prisoners) in penal colonies are producing boxes for missiles and ammunition, military shoes and suits, cartridges, shell casings for Russian military. In 2024, Pavel Latushka estimated that Belarusian government earns hundreds of millions USD every year exploiting forced labour in penal colonies. In 2025, prisoners produced furniture, paving stones, workwear, shoes, tableware, sports equipment, bread and confectionery products, and the production was sold on the domestic market and exported. Nils Muižnieks came to the conclusion that forced labour without adequate pay is a form of punishment for unjustly incarcerated Belarusians.

== Equality ==
=== Women's rights ===
On 28 September 2021, during the government-led attack on NGOs (see #Pressure on NGOs), the Supreme Court of Belarus forcibly liquidated the "Gender Perspectives" NGO (Russian: Гендерные перспективы) which promoted the women rights in Belarus by withstanding gender discrimination and domestic violence. GP collaborated with the government on legal issues concerning women and hosted the national hot line for victims of domestic violence which took c. 15,000 calls in 10 years. After the court liquidated this organization, its team claimed that the government "doesn't care about the needs of a huge number of women experiencing domestic violence or gender discrimination".

In 2023, female Canadian football player Patricia Lamanna terminated her contract with Belarusian football team FC Minsk, She left after 3 months over unpaid wages, a lack of provision for accommodation and an inability for her to use her Canadian credit card for transactions in Belarus due to restrictions.

=== Sexual orientation ===
In August 2004 the International Lesbian and Gay Association reported that the Belarusian authorities forced a gay cultural festival, Moonbow, to be canceled amid threats of violence; foreigners who participated in any related activities would be expelled from the country. In addition, neo-Nazi groups allegedly put pressure on the authorities to cancel the event. Bill Schiller, coordinator of the ILGCN, described the situation:

While the rest of Europe is moving forwards, this last dictatorship in Europe is trying to push its homosexual community into a 1930s Nazi style concentration camp", says Schiller. "Sweden and other democratic governments of Europe must react to the harassment, persecution and international isolation of human beings.

Several times the LGBT community were forbidden to hold pride parades in Belarus. Several activists, including Sergey Androsenko, were detained in 2010 while trying to hold a gay pride after its prohibition. In 2011 and 2013, the ministry refused to register LGBT organizations; therefore Belarus had no LGBT associations. Cases of police raids on gay parties were reported, and LGBT activists were often interrogated in connection with different crimes. One of the activists was beaten in the police station, but the prosecutor's office refused to start an investigation of this case.

== Ethnic discrimination ==
=== Antisemitism ===
In 2004, Charter'97 reported that on some government-job applications, Belarusians are required to state their nationality. This has been cited as evidence of state antisemitism in the region, as similar practices were allegedly used to discriminate against Jews in the USSR. They are also required to state information about their family and close relatives; this is alleged to be a breach of the constitution. Other countries (such as the United Kingdom) also ask applicants to state their ethnicity on application forms in many cases, although this information is usually used only for statistical purposes.

Belarus has been criticized by the Union of Councils for Jews in the Former Soviet Union, many American senators and human-rights groups for building a football stadium in Grodno on the site of a historic Jewish cemetery. A website, www.stopthedigging.org (since shut down), was set up to oppose the desecration of the cemetery. The Lukashenko administration also faced criticism on this issue from members of the National Assembly and Jewish organizations in Belarus.

In January 2004, Forum 18 reported that Yakov Gutman (president of the World Association of Belarusian Jewry) had accused Lukashenko of "personal responsibility for the destruction of Jewish holy sites in Belarus", accusing authorities of permitting the destruction of a synagogue to build a housing complex, demolishing a former shul in order to build a multi-story car park and destroying two Jewish cemeteries. According to the report, he was detained by police and taken to a hospital after apparently suffering a heart attack.

In March 2004, Gutman announced that he was leaving Belarus for the U.S. in protest at state antisemitism. His view was echoed by a July 2005 report by the UCSJ that a personal aide of the President (a former Communist Party ideologue, Eduard Skobelev) had published antisemitic books and promoted guns to solve what he termed the "Jewish problem". In 1997, Skobelev was given the title "Honored Figure of Culture" by Lukashenko and put in charge of the journal Neman.

The UCSJ's representative in Belarus, Yakov Basin, wrote a report detailing the authorities' alleged antisemitism. In addition, Yakov Basin said that the authorities were "pretending not to notice anti-Semitic tendencies among bureaucrats, ideologues and leaders of the Orthodox Church". He also reported on openly antisemitic books published by the Church.

The only Jewish higher-education institute in Belarus (the International Humanities Institute of Belarusian State University) was closed in February 2004, in what many local Jews believe is a deliberate act of antisemitism to undermine their educational rights and position in society. However, it is not the only educational institution to face closure in Belarus; the last independent university in the nation, the European Humanities University (a secular institution, which received funding from the European Union), was closed in July 2004. Commentators have implied that this may be part of a wider move by Lukashenko to crush internal dissent.

Jewish observers cite antisemitic statements by legislators and other members of government, and the failure of authorities in Belarus to punish perpetrators of antisemitic crime (including violent crime) as indicators of a policy of antisemitism from the state.

In 2007, Belarus president Lukashenko made an antisemitic comment about the Jewish community of Babrujsk:

"This is a Jewish city, and the Jews are not concerned for the place they live in. They have turned Babrujsk into a pigsty. Look at Israel—I was there."

The comment provoked active criticism from Jewish leaders and in Israel; Lukashenko subsequently sent a delegation to Israel.

In 2015, Lukashenko made another comment during a three-hours-long TV address, criticizing the governor of the Minsk Region for not keeping Belarus's Jewish population "under control." He also called the Jews "white boned," meaning they do not enjoy menial work.

In 2021, Alexander Lukashenko claimed that "the Jews have succeeded in making the whole world bow down to them", which was criticized by the foreign ministry of Israel. The same year, Belarusian government newspaper Belarus' Segodnya accused groups of Belarusian Jews of attempts to destabilize the situation in the country with the help of Jews abroad.

=== Anti-Polonism ===
On 3 August 2005, an activist working for the Union of Poles (representing the Polish minority community) was arrested and given a 15-day jail sentence and Lukashenko accused the Polish minority of plotting to overthrow him. The former head of the Union of Poles, Tadeusz Gawin, was later given a second sentence for allegedly beating one of his cell-mates (a claim he denies).

The offices of the Union of Poles were raided on 27 July 2005 in a crisis which came to the surface the previous day, when Andrzej Olborski (a Polish diplomat working in Minsk) was expelled from the country—the third such expulsion in three months. Poland had accused Belarus of persecuting the 400,000 Poles who have been a part of Belarus since her borders were moved westward after the Second World War.

=== Antiziganism ===
Former police officer reported that Belarusian militsiya has informal rules for Romani people which include arbitrary check of documents, phone examination, house inspection without reason. 80% of Romani people in Belarus claim that they faced antiziganism (antigypsyism) by the police which include arbitrary detention, multiple fingerprint registration, confiscation of vehicles.

On 16 May 2019, GAI road police officer was found dead near Mahilioŭ. Immediately after that, massive raids on local Romani people was organized. Up to 40 Romani people were detained. Women were released after night at the police station, but men remained at the police station. One of the released Romani women said she was told that "men were going to be in jail until we [police] found the criminals." It was later established that the GAI road police officer whose death led to these roundups committed suicide. Minister of interior Igor Shunevich refused to apologize to the Romani community for this incident. International Federation for Human Rights called for investigation of mass roundups of Roma people in Mahilioŭ.

=== Discrimination of Belarusian speakers ===
Members of the Belarusian-speaking minority of Belarus has been complaining about discrimination of the Belarusian language in Belarus, the lack of Belarusian language education and consumer information in Belarusian, all that despite the official status of Belarusian language as a state language besides Russian.

In its 2016 country human rights on Belarus report, the US State Department also stated that there was "discrimination against ... those who sought to use the Belarusian language." "Because the government viewed many proponents of the Belarusian language as political opponents, authorities continued to harass and intimidate academic and cultural groups that sought to promote Belarusian and routinely rejected proposals to widen use of the language," the report said.

Belarus has two official languages, but cases of trials in Russian despite defendants' petitions to use Belarusian language were reported.

On 23 July 2021, Mova Nanova Belarusian language courses was forcibly disbanded. In July 2021, the authorities conducted a search in the office of the Belarusian Language Society, and in August the Ministry of Justice applied for liquidation of this society in the Supreme Court of Belarus.

== Government-sponsored hostage-taking ==
One of the more notable examples of the Belarusian government's violation of human rights and international norms was the abduction, unlawful detainment and torture of American attorney Emanuel Zeltser and his assistant, Vladlena Funk. On 11 March 2008, Zeltser and Funk were abducted in London by Belarusian KGB agents. Both were drugged and flown to Belarus on a private jet belonging to Boris Berezovsky, a Russian oligarch and friend of Lukashenko who was wanted by Interpol for fraud, money-laundering, participation in organized crime and international financial crimes. After landing in Minsk Zeltser and Funk were detained by Lukashenko's guard, according to the U.S. State Department. They were transported to Amerikanka (the Stalin-era Belarusian KGB detention facility), where they were tortured, denied medication and told they would remain imprisoned indefinitely unless the U.S. lifted sanctions against Lukashenko. Zeltser and Funk were held hostage for 473 days and 373 days, respectively. Their seizure, torture and detention sparked international outrage and significant press coverage (apparently unexpected by Belarusian authorities).

The U.S. Department of State and members of the U.S. Congress repeatedly demanded the release of the hostages. World leaders, the European Parliament and international human-rights organizations joined the U.S. call for the immediate release of Funk and Zeltser. Amnesty International issued emergency alerts on the "torture and other ill-treatment" of Zeltser. Ihar Rynkevich, a Belarusian legal expert and Press Secretary of the Belarus Helsinki Commission, said in an interview: "This is yet another shameful case for the Belarusian judiciary for which more than one generation of Belarusian legal experts will blush." A strongly worded letter from the New York City Bar Association to Lukashenko condemned KGB abuse of Zeltser and Funk and demanding their immediate release. The bar-association letter expressed "great concerned [sic] about the arrests and detention of Mr Zeltser and Ms Funk and the reports of physical mistreatment of Mr Zeltser" and stated that this was inconsistent with Belarus' obligations under international agreements, including the International Covenant on Civil and Political Rights (ICCPR) and the Convention Against Torture and Other Inhuman or Degrading Treatment or Punishment (CAT). The letter also noted that the charges the KGB brought against Zeltser and Funk "appears to have no basis to it", lacks "any explanation or detail" and "concerns have thus been reported that this is a fabricated charge, created to justify their unlawful detention".

Neither Funk nor Zeltser had been lawfully "arrested", "charged", "indicted", "tried" or "convicted" under Belarusian or international law. They were unlawfully seized and held hostage, in violation of international law and Belarusian law. During their detention Funk and Zeltser were subjected to torture and cruel, inhuman or undignified treatment, in violation of Article 25 of the Belarus Constitution; U.S. law and international treaties, including the International Convention Against the Taking of Hostages (the Hostage Convention); the United Nations Convention Against Torture; the International Covenant on Civil and Political Rights (ICCPR); the United Nations Convention Against Torture (the Torture Convention); and the International Covenant on Civil and Political Rights (ICCPR). Zeltser's and Funk's abduction, detention and mistreatment in KGB captivity was an attempt to coerce the United States to lift sanctions against Lukashenko (and other members of the Belarusian government) and against the Belarusian petrochemical company Belneftekhim (which they owned). Belarus's actions were gross violations of the law of nations and universally accepted norms of the international law of human rights, including laws prohibiting hostage-taking and state-sponsored terrorism.

Yielding to the demands of the international community, Lukashenko released Funk on 20 March 2009 and Zeltser on 30 June (when a delegation from the U.S. Congress traveled to Belarus to meet with Lukashenko regarding the hostage crisis). U.S. chargé d'affaires in Belarus Jonathan Moore commented after their release: "At no time have the Belarusian authorities ever provided any indication that the charges against Mr Zeltser and Ms Funk were legitimate. As a result, I can only conclude that the charges in this case are thoroughly without merit; and are the result of extra-legal motivation."

Although the U.S. Department of State repeatedly said that it does not use its citizens as "bargaining chips", many in Belarus still believe that the U.S. made a deal with Lukashenko (inducing him to release the hostages in exchange for IMF credits to Belarus). Appearing on Russian TV network NTV, Anatoly Lebedko (Chairman of the Belarusian United Popular Party) said: "Washington was forced to pay ransom for its citizen [sic] by providing Lukashenko the IMF credits, pure and simple; in essence, this is hostage-taking, the practice, which is widespread in Belarus elevated to international level, where Lukashenko is not only sending a political message but demands monetary compensation for human freedom."

== Forced disappearances ==
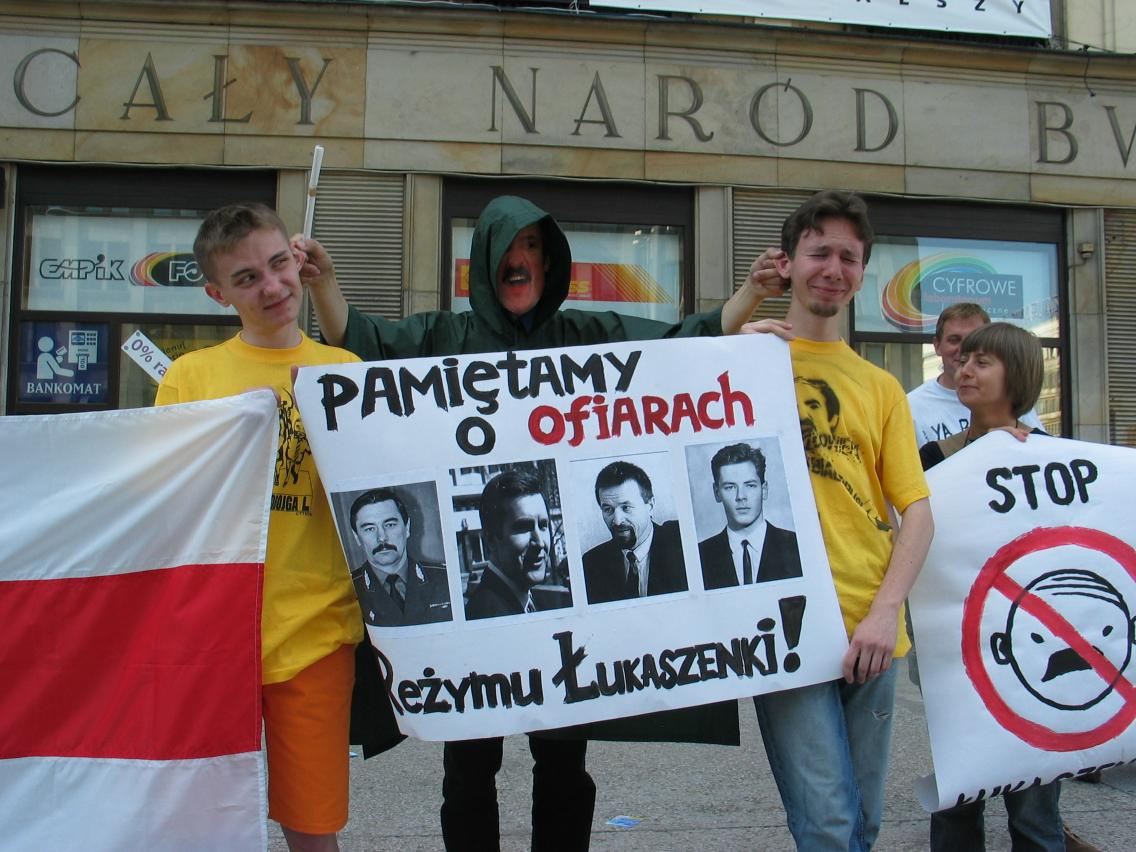
Demonstration in Warsaw, reminding about the disappearances of oppositionals in Belarus

In 1999 opposition leaders Yury Zacharanka and Viktar Hanchar together with his business associate Anatol Krasouski disappeared. Hanchar and Krasouski disappeared the same day of a broadcast on state television in which President Alexander Lukashenko ordered the chiefs of his security services to crack down on "opposition scum". Although the State Security Committee of the Republic of Belarus (KGB) had them under constant surveillance, the official investigation announced that the case could not be solved. The investigation of the disappearance of journalist Dzmitry Zavadski in 2000 has also yielded no results. Copies of a report by the Parliamentary Assembly of the Council of Europe, which linked senior Belarusian officials to the cases of disappearances, were confiscated.

In September 2004, the European Union and the United States issued travel bans for five Belarusian officials suspected in being involved in the kidnapping of Zacharanka: Interior Affairs Minister Vladimir Naumov, Prosecutor General Viktor Sheiman, Minister for Sports and Tourism Yuri Sivakov, and Colonel Dmitry Pavlichenko from the Belarus Interior Ministry.

In December 2019, Deutsche Welle published a documentary film in which Yury Garavski, a former member of a special unit of the Belarusian Ministry of Internal Affairs, confirmed that it was his unit which had arrested, taken away and murdered Zecharanka and that they later did the same with Viktar Hanchar and Anatol Krassouski.

== Ranking by human rights organizations ==
Major human rights organizations have been criticizing Belarus and its human rights situation. For most of Lukashenko's tenure, he has been reckoned as leading one of the most repressive regimes in the world.

Belarus in major freedom indices
	2021	2020	2019	2018	2017	2016	2015	2014	2013	2012	2011	2010	2009	2008	2007	2006	2005	2004	2003
Freedom in the World	Not free (aggregate score: 11/100)	Not free (aggregate score: 19/100)	Not free (aggregate score: 19/100)	Not free (aggregate score: 21/100)	Not free (aggregate score: 20/100)	Not free (aggregate score: 17/100)	Not free	Not free	Not free	Not free	Not free	Not free	Not free	Not free	Not free	Not free	Not free	Not free	Not free
Index of Economic Freedom				Repressed (58.1, world rank 108)	Repressed	Mostly unfree	Repressed	Repressed	Repressed										
Press Freedom Index	(Global rank: 158); 50.82	(Global rank: 153); 49.75	(Global rank: 153)	(Global rank: 155); 52.59	(Global rank: 153); 52.43	(Global rank: 157); 54.32	(Global rank: 157); 47.98	(Global rank: 157); 47.81	(Global rank: 157); 48.35	(Global rank: 168); 99.00	(Global rank: 154); 57.00	(Global rank: 151); 59.50	(Global rank: 154); 58.33	(Global rank: 151); 63.63	(Global rank: 151); 57.00	(Global rank: 152); 61.33	(Global rank: 144); 54.10	(Global rank: 151); 52.00	(Global rank: 124); 52.17
Democracy Index	Authoritarian	Authoritarian	Authoritarian	Authoritarian	Authoritarian	Authoritarian	Authoritarian	Authoritarian	Authoritarian	Authoritarian	Authoritarian		Authoritarian		Authoritarian				
Freedom of the Press (report)					83 (Not Free)	91 (Not Free)	93 (Not Free)	93 (Not Free)	Not Free	Not Free	Not Free	Not Free	Not Free	Not Free	Not Free	Not Free	Not Free	Not Free	Not Free
Polity data series				Autocracy	Autocracy														
World Index of Moral Freedom				45,7 points (Rank 88, Insufficient Moral Freedom)	Insufficient Moral Freedom														

Belarus' human rights friendly rhetoric was not supported by genuine human rights improvements in 2016. The death penalty remains in use. Officials continue to prosecute human rights activists and critical journalists on spurious charges. Legislative amendments further restricted freedom of expression by expanding the definition of "extremism" and by banning dissemination of certain types of information among children under the false pretense of protecting them. International observers recognized some progress during the September parliamentary elections, but called for additional reforms.

— Human Rights Watch World Report 2017

Severe restrictions on the rights to freedom of expression, of association and of peaceful assembly remained in place. The government continued to refuse co-operation with the UN Special Rapporteur on human rights in Belarus. At least four people were executed and four people were sentenced to death.

— Amnesty International 2016/2017 Report

President Alyaksandr Lukashenka secured a fifth term in the October 2015 presidential election, which failed to meet international standards, according to observers from the Organization for Security and Co-operation in Europe (OSCE). (...) The government was rewarded for the steps it had taken to improve its still-repressive human rights situation when the European Union and the United States granted the country temporary relief from sanctions.

— Freedom House Freedom in the World 2016 Report

== International criticism of human rights in Belarus ==
=== United Nations ===
The UN Human Rights Council 2007 Report notes that "the Special Rapporteur has encountered, for the third consecutive year, an absolute refusal to cooperate on the part of the Government of Belarus ... all efforts made to engage in constructive dialogue were fruitless"; "the situation of human rights in Belarus constantly deteriorated"; "The Government of Belarus did not consider any of the recommendations made by the Special Rapporteur" and treaty bodies (such as the Human Rights Committee).

The UN Special Rapporteur noted that "the political system of Belarus seems to be incompatible with the concept of human rights" and that "the Human Rights Council should either call for the democratization of the political regime and a change in the political behavior of the Government [of Belarus] or admit that Belarus' human rights record cannot be improved because the human rights violations are consistent with the political nature of the regime." The UN Special Rapporteur states that "Belarus does not respect its obligations under the international human rights instruments to which it has adhered" and reiterates his recommendation "that the Security Council should adopt appropriate measures to ensure the respect by the Republic of Belarus of its legal obligations, including:

- "to immediately establish a group of legal experts to investigate whether senior officials of the Government of Belarus are responsible for the disappearance and murders of several politicians and journalists and make concrete proposals for their prosecution, in order to bring to an end the impunity enjoyed by those involved in such crimes;
- to "finance ... assistance to the human rights defenders who have been politically harassed, oppressed or prosecuted";
- "to investigate the apparent involvement of senior government officials in international organized crime and illegal arms sales, monitor the international financial cash flows of Belarus and, if necessary, freeze foreign bank accounts of those involved in illicit trafficking, and prosecute criminals."

The Special Rapporteur stressed that "present trading relations with Belarus do not grant a better quality of life to Belarusian citizens, but allow President Lukashenko's regime to remain in power by systematically violating human rights and threatening international security" and recommended that "the European Union and the United States of America should maintain travel restrictions for Belarusian officials" and all other member states should adopt similar measures. The UN Special Rapporteur noted that "the opinions and assessments of the Special Rapporteur on the situation of human rights in Belarus were confirmed and fully shared by the most important European or Euro-Atlantic organizations, namely the OSCE, the OSCE Parliamentary Assembly, the Council of Europe, the Parliamentary Assembly of the Council of Europe, the European Council, the European Parliament, the European Commission and the NATO Parliamentary Assembly", adding: "It is impossible to believe that all these people are wrong or biased."

The Resolution of the UN General Assembly stated: "[t]he situation of human rights in Belarus in 2007 continued to significantly deteriorate, as documented in the reports of the Office for Democratic Institutions and Human Rights of the Organization for Security and Cooperation in Europe and the report of the Special Rapporteur on the situation of human rights in Belarus, which found that systematic violations of human rights continue to take place in Belarus ..."

and expressed deep concern:

(a) About the continued use of [Belarus's] criminal justice system to silence political opposition and human rights defenders, including through arbitrary detention, lack of due process and closed political trials of leading opposition figures and human rights defenders;
(b) About the failure of the Government of Belarus to cooperate fully with all the mechanisms of the Human Rights Council, in particular with the Special Rapporteurs on the situation of human rights in Belarus, while noting the serious concern relating to the continued and systematic violations of human rights in Belarus ...

On 17 September 2020, Amnesty International urged the United Nations Human Rights Council to take strong action for conducting an investigation into the escalating human rights crisis in Belarus.

On 18 September 2020, United Nations' top Human Rights council passed a resolution that intensified the scrutiny of the human rights abuses committed in Belarus during the peaceful protests. More than 10000 people were arrested during the protest as confirmed by the UN's Special Rapporteur on Belarus.

On 29 June 2022, Anaïs Marin, Special Rapporteur on the human rights situation in Belarus, warned that the deterioration of human rights in Belarus continues to engulf the country in a climate of fear and arbitrary rule. While presenting her annual report to the United Nations Human Rights Council in Geneva, she pointed to Government policies that have systematically tightened legislation and restricted civil and political rights.

=== European Union ===
In March 2006 the European Council imposed sanctions on Lukashenko and other members of the Belarusian government, having "deplored the failure of the Belarus authorities to meet OSCE commitments to democratic elections ... and condemned the action of the Belarus authorities ... in arresting peaceful demonstrators exercising their legitimate right of free assembly to protest at the conduct of the Presidential elections ..."

On 10 April 2006, the Council adopted restrictive measures against Lukashenko, the Belarusian leadership and the officials responsible for the violations of international electoral standards and international human-rights law for the crackdown on civil society and democratic opposition, proposing a visa ban and possible further measures. Common Position 2006/362/CFSP provided that the economic resources of Lukashenko and key Belarusian officials identified for this purpose should be frozen.

In its 8 November 2006 Declaration the Council stated that the European Union is "deeply concerned" about imprisonment of political leaders which show the "Belarusian authorities' repeated unwillingness to respect international human rights standards, especially the right to a fair trial. The European Union also expresses its concern about the denial of access of observers to the trial", and in its 2009 Conclusions it stated: "the Council deeply regrets the recent lack of significant progress in addressing its concerns in the area of human rights and fundamental freedoms, including as regards the crackdown on peaceful political actions ..."

On 5 August 2024, the EU Council decided to impose restrictive measures on 28 additional individuals in Belarus due to their involvement in internal repression and human rights violations. These sanctions targeted high-ranking officials in the Ministry of Internal Affairs, including two deputy heads of the Main Department for Combating Organised Crime and Corruption (HUBAZiK), as well as members of the judiciary and heads of correctional institutions. Prominent supporters of the Lukashenka regime, such as the director-general of the State news agency BelTA and other propagandists, were also sanctioned. The measures included asset freezes, travel bans, and restrictions on financial transactions. These actions were part of the EU's response to the repression following the 2020 presidential elections and Belarus's involvement in Russia's war against Ukraine.

=== United Kingdom ===
The UK Foreign and Commonwealth Office June 2008 Release on Belarus Human rights stated:

Belarus's human rights record since President Lukashenka came to power in 1994 has been poor. A September 2006 report ... by the UN Special Rapporteur ... on Human Rights, was highly critical of the situation. This is one of many reports to cite numerous human rights violations ... The situation continues to deteriorate, while the Belarusian authorities continue to ignore concerns raised by the EU and others ... Politically motivated arrests and detentions continue ... The UK and EU continue to raise human rights issues with the Belarusian government by way of regular EU statements, demarches by EU heads of mission in Minsk, and through international organizations including the UN and OSCE.

=== United States ===
According to the United States Department of State, as of 2016 the main human rights problems of Belarus continued to be the following:

"citizens were unable to choose their government through elections; in a system bereft of checks and balances, authorities committed abuses; and former political prisoners' political rights remained largely restricted while the government failed to account for longstanding cases of politically motivated disappearances."

Besides that, the US State Department pointed out abuses by the security forces, poor prison conditions, politically-motivated arrests, political interference in the work of the judiciary, restrictions of civil liberties and many other issues.

The United States is pursuing a "selective engagement" policy with the government of Belarus, limiting access by the government to U.S. government officials at the assistant-secretary level and below and restricting U.S. assistance to the Belarus government. On 19 June 2006, President George W. Bush declared a national emergency in connection with the actions of members of the Belarusian government (including Lukashenko), ordering sanctions against Lukashenko, other members of the Belarusian government and Belneftekhim for "undermining democratic process and constituting an unusual and extraordinary threat to the national security and foreign policy of the United States".

The US Department of State repeatedly criticized the Lukashenko regime, describing it as "a brutal, authoritarian dictatorship that blatantly ignores human rights and fundamental freedoms". Assessments by the United Nations, the United States and European and Euro-Atlantic organizations demonstrate Belarus's disregard for human rights, the subservience of Belarusian courts to Lukashenko's administration and members of Lukashenko's inner circle, and the use of the Belarusian judiciary as a tool for accomplishing improper political objectives and accommodating the interests of the regime. The United Nations Human Rights Council noted that the Belarusian political system is "incompatible with the concept of human rights". Belarus has been called "the last true remaining dictatorship in the heart of Europe" by the US Secretary of State Condoleezza Rice.

Belarus is subject to US sanctions for "undermining democratic process and constituting an unusual and extraordinary threat to the national security and foreign policy of the United States". It is also subject to sanctions imposed by the European Union for human rights violations. Belarus has been determined to be a habitual violator of international human rights laws and accepted norms of international behavior by the UN, the US, the Organization of Security and Cooperation in Europe (OSCE), the OSCE Parliamentary Assembly, the Council of Europe, the Parliamentary Assembly of the Council of Europe, the European Council, the European Parliament, the European Commission, and the NATO Parliamentary Assembly. As stated by the UN Special Rapporteur on Belarus, "it is impossible to believe that all these people are wrong or biased".

The 2008 U.S. Department of State Background Note: Belarus states:

[B]ilateral relations cooled following the election of President Lukashenka in July 1994. After the internationally unrecognized November 1996 constitutional referendum, which resulted in the dissolution of Belarus' legitimate parliament and the centralization of power in the executive branch, Lukashenko provoked a diplomatic crisis by ... confiscating diplomatic residences [of] the US, German, British, French, Italian, and IMF residences away from those missions ... In addition, Lukashenko used his newly centralized power to repress human rights throughout the country *** Since his election in July 1994 ... Lukashenka has consolidated power steadily in the executive branch through authoritarian means and has dominated all branches of government. He used a non-democratic referendum in November 1996 to amend the 1994 constitution to broaden his powers and illegally extend his term in office. *** In 2004, he engineered a fraudulent referendum that removed term limits on the presidency. *** In 2006, Lukashenka "won" another term in an undemocratic election. In January 2007, he further consolidated his rule through local elections that failed to meet international standards.

— U.S. State Department Background Note: Belarus

The 2008 State Department Belarus Report noted grave, habitual abuses by the Belarusian government of human rights and disregard for the freedoms of speech, press, religion and association. It points out inconsistencies between Belarusian law and court rulings. The 2008 State Department report demonstrated the subservience of the Belarusian courts to the Lukashenko administration and the private interests of his inner circle, to such an extent that the "courts" in Belarus exist in name only.

Salient points are:

According to its constitution, Belarus is a republic ... In practice, however, power is concentrated in the presidency. Since his election in 1994 as president, Alexander Lukashenka has consolidated his power over all institutions and undermined the rule of law through authoritarian means, manipulated elections, and arbitrary decrees. Subsequent presidential elections have not been free or fair, and the 28 September, [2008] parliamentary election failed to meet international standards. [Members of] security forces ... continued to commit numerous human rights abuses. The government's human rights record remained very poor as government authorities continued to commit frequent serious abuses. ... The government failed to account for past politically motivated disappearances [of human beings]. Prison conditions remained extremely poor, and reports of abuse of prisoners and detainees continued.

The government further restricted civil liberties, including freedoms of press, speech, assembly, association, and religion ... Corruption continued to be a problem ... Religious leaders were fined, imprisoned or deported for performing services ...

In the section titled: "Torture and Other Cruel, Inhuman, or Degrading Treatment or Punishment" the 2008 US State Dept. Belarus Report noted that while Belarusian law prohibits such practices; Belarusian KGB and other special forces disregard the law with impunity, detainees and demonstrators are subjected to beating. The State Department references the 2 September 2008 Report of the International Federation of Human Rights (FIDH) on Conditions of Detention in Belarus which noted "substantial evidence" of the use of torture and mistreatment of suspects during criminal and administrative investigations.

The section of the report entitled "Arbitrary Interference with Privacy, Family, Home, or Correspondence" noted that "the [Belarusian] law prohibits such actions; however, the government did not respect these prohibitions in practice"; while "the law requires a warrant for searches" the KGB "conducted unauthorized searches ... without warrants" with "numerous instances in which authorities searched residences and offices for clearly political reasons". It notes that "[t]he lack of independence of the prosecutor's office rendered due process protections meaningless".

On 12 June 2009 the Obama administration continued the sanctions against Belarus, pursuant to the "Notice on Continuation of the National Emergency With Respect to the Actions and Policies of Certain Members of the Government of Belarus and Other Persons That Undermine Democratic Processes or Institutions in Belarus".

== Freedom in the World reports ==
The following chart shows Belarus's ratings since 1991 in the Freedom in the World reports, published annually by Freedom House. A rating of 1 is "free"; 7, "not free".^{1}

Historical ratings

Year	Political Rights	Civil Liberties	Status	President/Head of State^{2}
1991	4	4	Partly Free	Stanislav Shushkevich
1992	4	3	Partly Free	Stanislav Shushkevich
1993	5	4	Partly Free	Stanislav Shushkevich
1994	4	4	Partly Free	Stanislav Shushkevich
1995	5	5	Partly Free	Alexander Lukashenko
1996	6	6	Not Free	Alexander Lukashenko
1997	6	6	Not Free	Alexander Lukashenko
1998	6	6	Not Free	Alexander Lukashenko
1999	6	6	Not Free	Alexander Lukashenko
2000	6	6	Not Free	Alexander Lukashenko
2001	6	6	Not Free	Alexander Lukashenko
2002	6	6	Not Free	Alexander Lukashenko
2003	6	6	Not Free	Alexander Lukashenko
2004	7	6	Not Free	Alexander Lukashenko
2005	7	6	Not Free	Alexander Lukashenko
2006	7	6	Not Free	Alexander Lukashenko
2007	7	6	Not Free	Alexander Lukashenko
2008	7	6	Not Free	Alexander Lukashenko
2009	7	6	Not Free	Alexander Lukashenko
2010	7	6	Not Free	Alexander Lukashenko
2011	7	6	Not Free	Alexander Lukashenko
2012	7	6	Not Free	Alexander Lukashenko
2013	7	6	Not Free	Alexander Lukashenko
2014	7	6	Not Free	Alexander Lukashenko
2015	7	6	Not Free	Alexander Lukashenko
2016	7	6	Not Free	Alexander Lukashenko
2017	6	6	Not Free	Alexander Lukashenko
2018	7	6	Not Free	Alexander Lukashenko
2019	7	6	Not Free	Alexander Lukashenko
2020	7	6	Not Free	Alexander Lukashenko
2021	7	7	Not Free	Alexander Lukashenko

== In art ==
- Viva Belarus!, a film about the political regime of Alexander Lukashenko and human rights in Belarus during his rule.

== See also ==
- Belarus-Council of Europe relations
- List of people and organizations sanctioned in relation to human rights violations in Belarus
- Classification of extremist materials in Belarus
- Belarusian human rights organisations
  - Belarusian Helsinki Committee
  - Over Barrier
  - Viasna Human Rights Centre
  - We Remember Foundation
- Belarusian democracy movement
- Day of Solidarity with Belarus
- Jeans Revolution
- Human rights in Russia

== Notes ==
1.Note that the "Year" signifies the "Year covered". Therefore the information for the year marked 2008 is from the report published in 2009, and so on.
2.As of 1 January.

== Sources ==
Freedom of press

- Belarus ranked 16th worst ranked country on RSF Press Freedom index
- Freedom House ranks Belarus as "Not Free"

Gays and lesbians

- Gay Times country profile
- Asylum seeker wins, but still detained
- Belarus gays parade in election fever
- Gay and lesbian websites blocked in Belarus
- Orthodox Church organises homophobes
- ILGA – threats from Belarusian regime force organisers to cancel festival
- Failure of Gay Pride 2000
- Global Gayz – Belarus News and Reports, 2004–05

Polish minority crisis

- n:Poland accuses Belarus of human rights violations Poland accuses Belarus of human rights violations
- Polish chief jailed again
- Belarus-Poland row escalates

Anti-Semitism

- Protests over Belarus Jewish graves.
- Belarus digs up Jewish graves
- President Lukashenko: in quotes
- Belarus lawmakers protest destruction of Jewish sites
- Forum 18 article
- Jews get by in Belarus, but they feel the authorities' watchful eyes
- Lukashenko aide continues anti-semitic publishing
- Belarus aide leaves country in protest at state anti-semitism

Neo-Nazi allegations

- Neo-Nazis continue attacking Belarusian oppositionists
- Minsk Neo-Nazis March To Commemorate Fallen Comrade
