= Syarhei Parsyukevich =

Belarusian small businessman (born 1967)

- Сяргей Парсюкевіч
- Born: 14 May 1967 (age 58); Vitebsk, Byelorussian SSR, Soviet Union
- Education: Military Engineering-Technical University
- Occupation(s): Engineer; former businessman
- Known for: Political imprisonment

Syarhei Parsyukevich (Belarusian: Сяргей Парсюкевіч, Siarhiej Parsiukievič; born 14 May 1967, in Vitebsk) is a Belarusian former businessman who was a political prisoner in 2008 following participation in a protest against a decree passed by President Alexander Lukashenko. During his 15-day detainment, he was allegedly beaten by a prison guard, who later accused him of being the attacker. After a short trial, Parsykevich was sentenced to 2.5 years in prison for violence against a police officer and ordered to pay the guard Rbls 1.1 million, equal to about €325, in emotional damages.

The case was met with international disdain, with the European Union, the U.S. Department of State, the Permanent Delegation of Norway to the OSCE and the Lithuanian Ministry of Foreign Affairs, among others, condemning the harsh sentence and undue process. He was given a presidential pardon in August 2008 after six months in prison.

== Background ==
Parsyukevich was born 14 May 1967 in Vitebsk, Soviet Union (now Belarus). After studying space engineering at Military Engineering-Technical University in Leningrad, he worked at the Baikonur Cosmodrome. He returned to Vitebsk in 1995 and became a police officer, reaching the rank of major and heading the criminology department. He retired in 2004 to become an entrepreneur. Parsyukevich and his wife Natalya have a son, Denis.

== Imprisonment ==
Parsyukevich was chairman of the union Council of Individual Entrepreneurs of the Smolensk Market. On 10 January 2008, he took part in a demonstration at October Square in Minsk along with other small business owners to protest presidential decree #706, which prohibited business owners to employ more than three close relatives. Though several thousand people attended the rally, Parsyukevich was one of 14 who faced criminal charges. On 13 January, he was arrested in Vitebsk for participating in an unauthorised demonstration and brought back to Minsk, where he was given a 15-day prison sentence at Okrestina. He protested his imprisonment by refusing to eat.

On 21 January, the eighth day of his hunger strike, he was allegedly taken from his cell into a separate room and beaten by one of the prison guards, Alyaksandr Dulub. Though Ales Taustyka, another detained business owner, corroborated Parsyukevich's story, Dulub accused Parsyukevich of attacking him. After a preliminary investigation, during which only witnesses supporting Dulub's case were interviewed, Parsyukevich was formally arrested on 4 March for violence against a police officer. On 23 April, he was found guilty and sentenced to 2.5 years in prison and ordered to pay Dulub Rbls 1.1 million, equal to about €325, in "moral suffering." He was placed in a windowless cell in Prison Number 8, which aggravated his asthma to the point of illness. On 21 May, he was placed in a medical ward with psychiatric patients in Zhodzina. The appeal to re-hear his case was dismissed and he was transferred to Prison Number 17 in Shklow before being returned to Okrestina.

On 20 August 2008, after six months in prison, Parsyukevich was given a presidential pardon and released along with Andrei Kim, another political prisoner. He was unable to obtain the necessary licenses to reopen his business, so returned to the engineering sector. He was active in the Tell the Truth! campaign, becoming its coordinator for Vitebsk, and showed support for political prisoners such as Aleh Surhan, Mikalay Autukhovich and Uladzimir Asipenk, whose cases he felt were similar to his. By 2012, however, he had become disillusioned with the movement and stopped participating in politics. He later found out the movement was being funded by Russia, which he told Radio Svoboda in 2018 was impossible for him to support after Russia's actions in Crimea.

As of 2018, he was still refusing to pay damages to the policeman he accused of beating him, making it impossible for him to legally travel outside of Belarus. His story appeared in Alena Struvė's 2018 book Турма, мужчына і жанчына: як сядзяць у сучаснай Беларусі (lit. trans.: Prison, man and woman: How they sit in modern Belarus).
