= Prison Number 8 =

Prison in Zhodzina, Belarus

- Interactive map of Prison Number 8
- Location: Zhodzina, Belarus; 54.11183566072931°N 28.368719893979414°E
- Security class: Criminal Detention Centre
- Capacity: 1500
- Opened: 1984
- Managed by: Minsk Oblast Executive Committee

Prison № 8 (Belarusian: Папраўчая ўстанова «Турма № 8») is a prison in Zhodzina, Belarus founded in May 1984. It has become known as a place of imprisonment for many political prisoners since 2020, after the 2020–2021 Belarusian protests.

== History ==
The building was erected in 1984 as a "medical and occupational prevention." In 1992, the hospital was transformed into a pre-trial detention center № 8 of the Minsk Regional Executive Committee. In 1999, a special corps for lifers was opened. Prisoners are being held in prison pending investigation and sentenced to life imprisonment.

== Political repression ==
The pre-trial detention center can hold up to 1,500 people, but former prisoners report actual significant overruns. There have been several suicides and sudden deaths in prison, which human rights activists have linked to violence by the administration. In 2015, the Zhodzina prison warden was sentenced to six years in prison for "suicide" and "abuse of office". Former political prisoner Valery Levaneuski complained about autocracy and abuse by prison staff.

Below are the testimonies of other political prisoners.

Alexander Kozulin: "Such people cannot work with prisoners because of their propensity for sadism and cruelty, their propensity for provocation against prisoners, which they enjoy."

Dmitry Dashkevich: "They beat and threshed so that the bell rang. And I was mocked. Zhodzina prison has a bad reputation. Much depended on the boss, could put a mad, young man who had to be served. So I fully admit that people were driven to suicide and could be beaten to death."

Eduard Palčys: "Both in terms of conditions of detention and in terms of treatment of the villagers, this is a very cruel prison. If a person becomes ill, there is a high probability that he may die due to lack of medical care. Do not call a doctor. Of the drugs for all diseases give aspirin and charcoal. I did not see anyone being beaten, but they told me what it was like. And there is such a fame about one operative that the detainees are treated very harshly. Unbearable conditions are simply created for some of them. In some cells there is simply nothing to breathe, there is basically no oxygen. The room is designed for 10 people and holds 15. 14 of them smoke and there is no ventilation. And the non-smoker just suffocates. I fully admit that those who were displeased there could be dealt with, that people were beaten and tortured there. Although I was in Zhodzina in September, there was no information that anyone had died in prison. I found out about the death of the detainee later, in Valadarka, from the newspaper."

=== After the events of 2020 ===
Former detainees 2020–2021 The facts of beating men in the Zhodzina pre-trial detention center are also reported. According to the testimony, bad conditions were deliberately created for women: all mattresses, blankets, books and magazines, games, pens were taken away, and the lights were not turned off at night.

"There were fifteen people in the cell for ten people. The guys slept just on the floor. We were not allowed to have dinner: five fish, casserole and two cups of tea were brought for 15 people. Well, how do you share it all? We gave up everything. The next day, the whole cell wrote 40 complaints to the head of the precinct. He tore down the roof, ran, shouted that he would add more people to the cell. They clung to the fact that the mattresses were lying incorrectly, and the next day everything was taken away, they threatened to take away the gear. The chief ordered that there should be nothing meat, because it spoils quickly, and by April 4 you need to eat or destroy all dried fruits and nuts. Like, if you do not eat, everything will be thrown away. On Sunday we had a grand shmon, looking for nuts, tea, everything in the world"

"Stretches and beatings have started in Zhodzina after March 25. Mattresses with pillows were taken away, 13 of us were in the eight-bed cell. Slept on the floor. There was no ventilation. Two books, magazines, pens and pencils were confiscated two days later. Salt with spices even. At night, wake up checks specially steel"

The prisoners complained about unsatisfactory sanitary conditions and the fact of coronavirus infection during their stay in the Zhodzina detention center.

Belarusian punk bands were placed in the Zhodzina detention center.

== Notable inmates ==
- Ales Bialiatski, human rights activist
- Alexander Kozulin, former rector of the Belarusian State University, presidential candidate in the 2006 election
- Zmitser Dashkevich, politician
- Vasil Parfyankou, activist
- Mikola Dziadok, activist, blogger
- Eduard Palčys, activist, blogger
- Dmitry Polienko, activist
- Nikolai Tymoshenko, serial killer

=== After the events of 2020 ===
- Mikola Statkevich, politician
- Maria Kolesnikova, politician
- Igor Losik, blogger
- Ekaterina Andreeva, journalist
- Darya Chultsova, journalist
- Dzyanis Urbanovich, leader of the Young Front
- Aliaksandr Vasilievič, entrepreneur, media manager, former owner of Gallery "B"
