= Okrestina =

Pre-trial detention centre in Minsk, Belarus

Criminal Detention Centre of the Minsk Executive Committee’s Main Internal Affairs Directorate
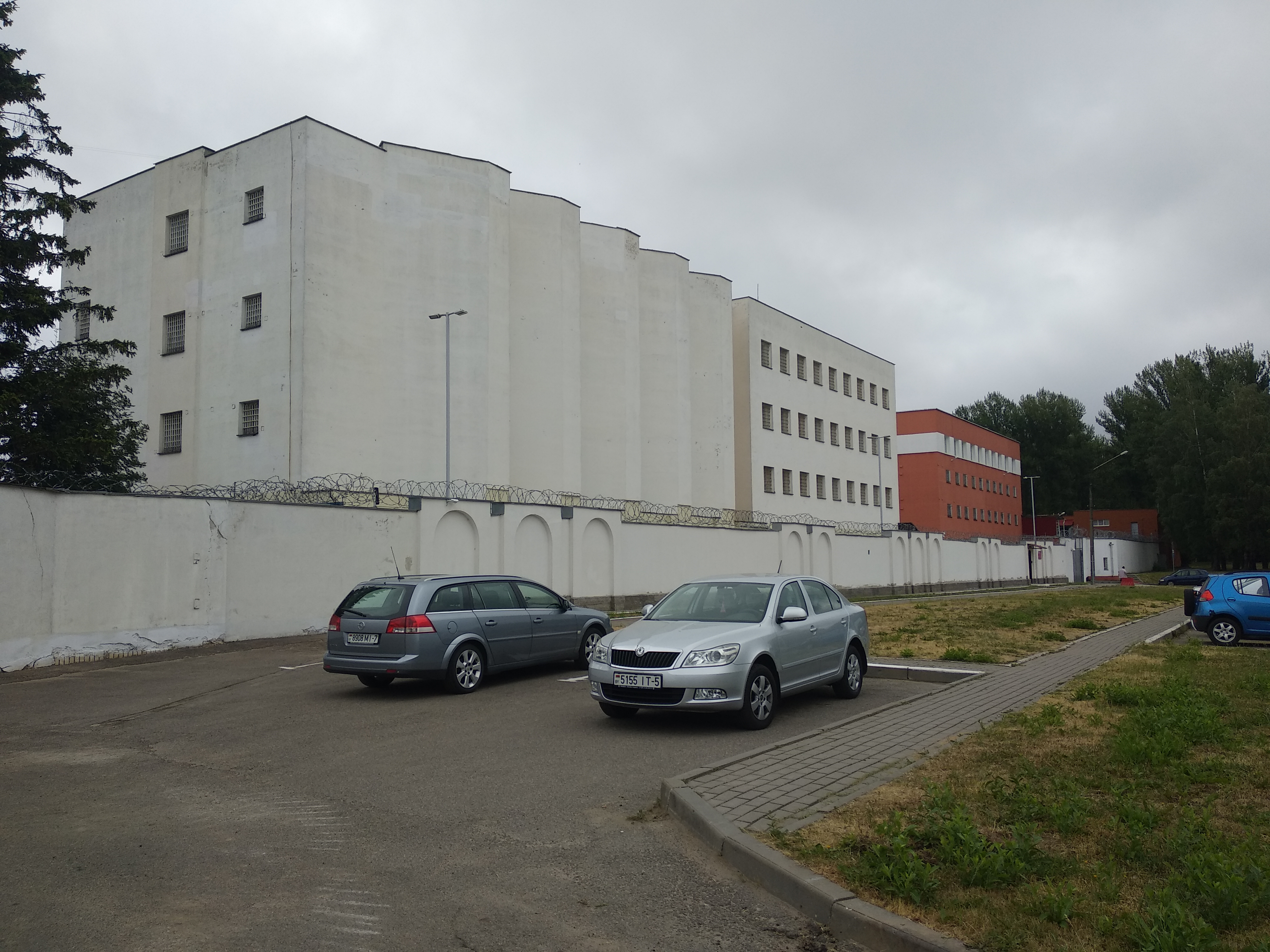
- Okrestina Detention Centre
- Interactive map of Criminal Detention Centre of the Minsk Executive Committee’s Main Internal Affairs Directorate
- Location: Minsk, Belarus
- Security class: Criminal Detention Centre
- Managed by: Minsk City Police Department

Okrestina Detention Centre, Akrestsina Detention Centre, officially, the Criminal Detention Centre of the Minsk Executive Committee’s Main Internal Affairs Directorate (Belarusian: Цэнтра ізаляцыі правапарушальнікаў ГУУС Мінгарвыканкама, romanized: Centra izaliacyi pravaparušaĺnikaŭ HUUS Minharvykankama, Russian: Центр изоляции правонарушителей ГУВД Мингорисполкома), is a pre-trial detention centre in Minsk, Belarus. The prison is known as a detention centre for activists of the Belarusian opposition arrested during mass protests against the government of president Alexander Lukashenko. On 21 June 2021, the U.S. Treasury has added Okrestina Detention Centre to its Specially Designated Nationals and Blocked Persons List.

== Name ==
The prison is most commonly referred by its informal name Okrestina (Russian: Окрестина) or Akrestsina (Belarusian: Акрэсціна, official transliteration: Akrescina) derived from the name of the street where it is located (which is in turn named after Soviet WWII ground-attack pilot, hero of the Soviet Union Boris Okrestin).

== Torture ==
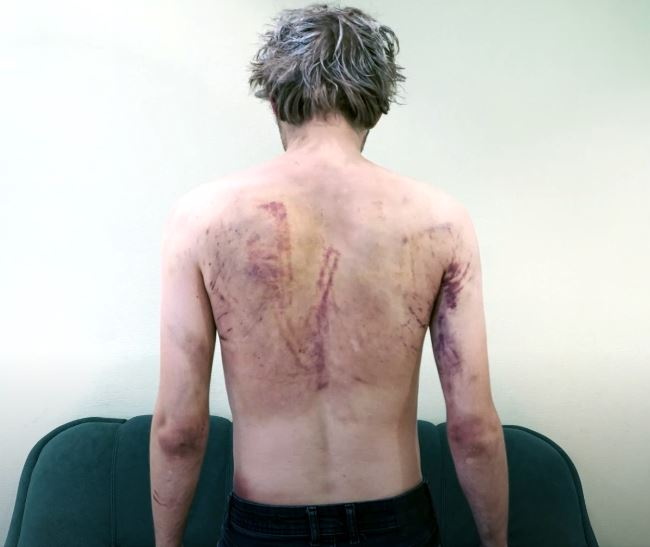
Protester shows bruises from tortures at Okrestina, 2020

According to numerous reports, many protesters arrested during the 2020 Belarusian protests, are tortured in Okrestina by soldiers of the OMON.

Many were beaten and in some cases seriously injured. At least three detainees suffered injuries indicative of sexual violence in Okrestina or on the way there. The victims were hospitalized with intramuscular bleeding of the rectum, anal fissure and bleeding, and damage to the mucous membrane of the rectum.

On the night of August 13–14, 2020, relatives of people detained in Okrestina recorded the sounds of incessant beatings that could be clearly heard on the street. Several voices can also be heard on the recordings, screaming in pain and begging for mercy. One released inmate reported that those who begged officers not to be beaten were beaten even more severely.

On September 29, 2020, detainee Dsjanis Kusnjazou was hospitalized from Okrestia with fractures of the skull bones, third-degree open craniocerebral trauma, hematomas, rib fractures, and pulmonary contusion. He succumbed to his injuries. Security authorities claimed the injuries were due to Kusnjazou falling from his bunk bed.

On 11 October 2020, a video recording went public showing prisoners being chased through the ranks of police and security forces in Okrestina and being continuously beaten.

In October 2020, Okrestina's Detention Centre head Ivan Sakalouski (Sokolovskiy) was sanctioned by the European Union, the United Kingdom, Canada and Switzerland. More Okrestina officials were banned from entering the European Union in June 2021 and the United States in August 2021. The U.S. Treasury gave the following motivation for including Okrestina to its SDN list in June 2021:

Following the peaceful protests against the fraudulent August 9, 2020 presidential election, many protesters have been arrested and subsequently detained at the notorious Akrestsina Detention Center (Akrestsina) in Minsk. Protesters have described intense physical abuse, including torture and inhumane conditions during their detention at Akrestsina. It has been the site of beatings, arbitrary detentions, and other human rights abuses in the months since the fraudulent presidential election. Akrestsina is being designated pursuant to E.O. 13405 for having materially assisted, sponsored, or provided financial, material, or technological support for, or goods or services in support of, human rights abuses related to political repression in Belarus.

In November 2021, Belarusian President Alexander Lukashenko confirmed in an interview to the British Broadcasting Corporation that people were beaten in Okrestina, saying: "OK, OK, I admit it, I admit it. People were beaten in the Okrestina detention centre. But there were police beaten up too and you didn't show this."

== Famous inmates ==
- Mark Bernstein
- Zmitser Dashkevich
- Andrei Kim
- Anatoly Lebedko
- Uladzimir Nyaklyayew
- Nasta Palazhanka
- Paval Sieviaryniec
- Mikola Statkevich
- Siarhei Tsikhanouski
- Franak Viačorka

== See also ==
- Amerikanka
- OMON (Belarus)
