= Zmitser =

Zmitser (Belarusian: Зміцер) is a Belarusian version of personal name Demetrius or Russian Dmitri. Notable people with the surname include:

- Zmitser Dashkevich (born 1981), Belarusian politician
- Źmicier Sidarovič (1965–2014), Belarusian musician, singer and piper
- Zmitser Zhylunovich (1887–1937), Belarusian poet, writer, and journalist
