= Nikolai Tymoshenko =

Belarusian serial killer

- Born: Nikolai Andreyevich Tymoshenko; 1970 (age 55–56); Mogilev Region, Byelorussian SSR
- Other names: "The Fatinsky Maniac" "The Surgeon Maniac"
- Conviction: Murder x3
- Penalty: Life imprisonment x2

Details
- Victims: 3+
- Span of crimes: 1999–2010
- Country: Belarus
- State: Mogilev
- Date apprehended: April 2010
- Imprisoned at: Prison Number 8, Zhodzina, Minsk Region

Nikolai Andreyevich Tymoshenko (Russian: Николай Андреевич Тимошенко; born 1970), known as The Fatinsky Maniac (Russian: Фатинский маньяк), is a Belarusian serial killer who killed at least three women in the Mogilev Region from 1999 to 2010. He was found guilty of the respective crimes, and was sentenced to two life terms.

== Murders ==
=== First known murder ===
Tymoshenko's first known murder was committed between May and June 1999. During that time frame, he met a young woman aged between 18 and 20 years old in the village of Amkhavaya 2, offering to take her to his dacha to relax and have a drink. The woman offered to pay all expenses, as she reportedly earned 2 million rubles.

After spending some time drinking together, Tymoshenko asked the woman if she could share some of her money with him, to which she categorically refused. Angered, Tymoshenko grabbed her and starting pushing her, causing the woman to hit her head against a nearby wall. She began resisting, causing the assailant to punch her three times in the chest before choking her to death. To hide the body, Tymoshenko dismembered the remains and buried them in separate places - one half in his mother's backyard, while the other was buried outside the village. He burned the victim's clothes, passport and personal items and then spent 900,000 of her money for his expenses.

=== Move to Mogilev ===
Sometime after the first victim's murder, Tymoshenko and his mother moved to Fatina Street in Mogilev, a run-down area of the city occupied by poor people. He made a living by doing odd jobs, most notably butchering pigs at a slaughterhouse, but once his elderly mother died, Tymoshenko stopped working overall. Residents regarded him as a "quiet alcoholic" and loner who spent most of his time drinking and refusing to interact with others at all.

=== Fatina Street Murders ===
Around February 17, 2010, Tymoshenko stopped by a local bar to buy wine, where he came across 40-year-old Svetlana Karaseva. After talking for a while, he invited her to his apartment so they could drink in private. In a drunken stupor, Karaseva started complaining about her issues to Tymoshenko, who attempted to offer her some advice. Irritated, she said that she did not need any help, called him a bum and started swearing at him.

A conflict ensued between the two, during which Tymoshenko knocked her down to the ground and choked her for approximately ten minutes. After making sure that she was dead, he grabbed a knife and then proceeded to dismember, decapitate and disembowel her body. He then put the remains in bags, a bucket, a curtain and Karaseva's red jacket, which he then discarded in the wasteland or into the Dnieper. As Karaseva's family members had abandoned her due to her constant drinking and frequent disappearances from home, she was not reported missing.

Less than a month later, Tymoshenko was returning home when a seemingly drunken woman ran up to him and asked him for help, claiming that somebody was chasing her to steal her bottle of vodka. The woman, 35-year-old Svetlana Bykova, had just stolen 20,000 rubles of her own son's money gifted for his birthday, and likely wanted to hide from her relatives. Disintered in asking about her personal life, Tymoshenko nonetheless let her stay.

Upon drinking two glasses of vodka, Bykova started complaining about how all the men in her life were homeless bums. This remark was enough to anger Tymoshenko, who punched her in the temple and strangled her to death. Just like Karaseva before her, Bykova's body was dismembered, decapitated and disemboweled, and then scattered in the nearby wasteland.

== Discovery of remains and panic ==
The recent disappearances of the two women, followed by the unrelated disappearance of a female mortuary worker, sparked fears that a serial killer was operating in Mogilev. On March 23, utility workers found Karaseva's torso, wrapped up in her red jacket, near the Yubileiny-Fatina bridge. Around that time, a husband and wife found a bag containing ribs and a spine but mistook them for dog meat. The couple took the ribs home, cooked and ate them before throwing away the bones the following morning. In the evening, the couple were visited by policemen, who informed them that the remains they had eaten were human.

After Bykova's remains were found as well, panic ensued in the Fatina district. In ten days, three men were arrested for the murders, but each was released after it was determined that they were innocent. Rumors of all kinds started spreading, ranging from organ trafficking gangs to a supposed note being found at one crime scene, with the perpetrator proclaiming that he wanted to kill all women. In a press statement, the Secretary of the Mogilev Prosecutor's Office Alla Kuznetsova refuted claims that a serial killer was operating in the area, saying that the murders were likely the result of "either a scandal, drunkenness, or a showdown on domestic grounds".

== Arrest, trial, and sentence ==
As part of their investigation into the murders, authorities ordered that all male residents of Fatina Street must provide samples of their saliva. Among them was Tymoshenko, and once his sample was compared to semen found on one of the bodies, it was determined to be a positive match. He was apprehended soon after, and once his apartment was examined, authorities found bloodstains that were linked to both murder victims.

Although he initially attempted to deny responsibility, Tymoshenko eventually realized that the evidence was overwhelming and confessed to the crimes. He explained in detail how the events had transpired but tried to place the blame on the victims for calling him a bum. A forensic psychological examination determined that he was sane, noting that Tymoshenko's only notable issues were several episodes of delirium tremens caused by his chronic alcoholism. Due to his admission, the prosecutors did not seek the death penalty. He was found guilty on all charges and sentenced to life imprisonment - upon hearing the verdict, Tymoshenko said that while he admitted that he was guilty, he felt no remorse for what he had done.

=== Imprisonment and confession ===
Following his conviction, Tymoshenko was transferred to Prison Number 8 in Zhodzina to serve his sentence. Two years after his conviction, he contacted the Prosecutor's Office and unexpectedly confessed to the 1999 murder. Authorities were dispatched to the location in Amkhavaya 2 as indicated by him and soon unearthed skeletal human remains. Attempts to identify the woman proved futile, as the lack of any form of identification and the passage of time prevented law enforcement from confirming any missing persons reports. As a result, the first victim remains a Jane Doe.

Although he willingly confessed and even indicated the body's location, Tymoshenko later retracted it and claimed that he was innocent. This was not taken seriously by the courts, who convicted him and handed him another life term in 2015. He attempted to appeal the verdict to the Supreme Court, but his appeal was denied. A few months after his initial confession, the Head of the Department of Internal Affairs for the Mogilev Region, Fyodor Baleiko, made a statement to the press that it was very likely Tymoshenko had killed others.

== See also ==
- List of serial killers by country
