= Marina Dubina =

Belarusian environmentalist

- Occupations: Environmentalist, human rights lawyers

Marina Dubina is a Belarusian environmentalist and human rights lawyer, and serves as the executive director of the NGO Ecohome. Established in 1996, Ecohome is one of the longest-running non-profit organizations in Belarus, promoting sustainable development and renewable energies.

Dubina was accused of participating in an illegal demonstration in Minsk in September of 2020, despite evidence that she was out of the country at the time. On 6 October 2020, uniformed men with no identification marks deployed teargas into Dubina's home and detained her. She was charged with participation in an unauthorized protest and sentenced to thirteen days of administrative arrest. This episode occurred while Ecohome was working to halt the construction of a Belarusian nuclear power plant.

Ecohome was liquidated by the government (along with other NGOs) in 2021. See Human rights in Belarus.
