= Mova Nanova =

Mova Nanova Belarusian: Мова Нанова
- Formation: 13 January 2014
- Type: NGO
- Headquarters: Minsk
- Location: Belarus (unofficially), Poland, Lithuania, Latvia, Georgia
- Official language: Belarusian
- Key people: Gleb Labadzenka Alesia Litvinouskaja
- Website: Official website

Mova Nanova (Belarusian: Мова Нанова, Mova Nanova, literally, “language anew”) is a Belarusian course that has taken place in Minsk, the capital of Belarus, since January 13, 2014. It is a non-profit NGO, a cultural and linguistic initiative aimed at expanding the everyday use of the Belarusian language, which alongside Russian is one of the two official languages of Belarus. The lessons are held in the gallery of modern art «Ў». The initiative has caught on and has been acclaimed by other regional cities that support the endeavour locally – now the courses can be also found in Baranavičy, Hrodna, Babrujsk, Niasviž, Brest, Maladziečna, Mahilioŭ, Viciebsk and Homel.

The undertaking has also expanded outside Belarus and has an affiliate group in Kraków. On 23 July 2021, Mova Nanova was forcibly disbanded by the Minsk district executive committee. The organization continues to operate in exile in Poland (Warsaw, etc.), Lithuania, Latvia, Georgia and elsewhere.

Mova Nanova in Minsk has been set up and is hosted by Alesia Litvinouskaja, a linguist, and Gleb Labadzenka, a journalist. The course gathers about 300 students weekly and is attended by people of different background and all walks of life from Belarusian-speaking physicians and software engineers to architects and singers, to writers and actors, to historians and students, to kids and senior citizens. The distinct feature and integral part of each class is special guests. Usually, they are public figures and famous people promoting the Belarusian language and culture, and who see this linguistic environment as an intrinsic part of their daily life.

The course is informal by nature, and the teaching process is not governed by strict academic rules. The lessons are divided into different topics like fashion, medicine, relatives, etc., and are split up into several sections – vocabulary, grammar, interesting facts, historical or cultural edutainment section, and more.

== Awards ==
In June, 2014 Mova Nanova was awarded the Grand Prix for the best project in the "Undertakings of Social Value" category at AD!NAK, the festival of Belarusian advertising, media and communication.

== Other activities ==
Mova Nanova offers the service of free translation called "Linguistic Emergency Service".

The first national sports contest Mova Cup (Language Cup) took place on September 28, 2014, where there was also a team representing Mova Nanova, which came 5th in the overall standing.

The language course for preschool children "Mova Nanova for the Little Ones" opened its doors to very young learners in the gallery of modern art «Ў» on October 5, 2014.

== Premise for emergence ==
The initiative has emerged as a response to the growing need of a certain part of Belarusian population inclined to raise their linguistic, cultural and national awareness, and among those people who are interested in building up their knowledge of the Belarusian language.

According to the latest census of 2009, around 53% of the population of Belarus consider the Belarusian language to be their mother tongue, however, only about 23% of the respondents say they speak it at home. The language is labelled as vulnerable by UNESCO, which is reflected on its Atlas of the World’s Languages in Danger.

Being brought up in a predominantly Russian linguistic environment, many Belarusian people still experience linguistic interference when they try to speak Belarusian and find it difficult to switch to this language and achieve fluency in an everyday conversation. One of the common reasons that impedes wider adoption of Belarusian beyond the passive utilization in reading and listening is said to be lack of confidence about the level of proficiency that in fluent speech often results in a mixture of both Russian and Belarusian. This blend is often informally called “trasianka”. Therefore, one of the primary aims of the Mova Nanova course is to help those who are aspiring to speak Belarusian regain and develop confidence about using the language in a daily conversation, refresh their existing knowledge, and instill curiosity about further learning of the Belarusian language, culture and history.

== In Minsk ==
The language courses Mova Nanova first started in Minsk, and now are hosted there by the philologist Alesia Litvinouskaja and the journalist Gleb Labadzenka. The second year of the course started on September 8, 2014.

== Mova Nanova in regions ==
=== Babrujsk ===
Alesia Litvinouskaja and Gleb Labadzenka handed the baton to the like-minded fellow activists from Babrujsk on February 21, 2014, International Mother Language Day.

=== Hrodna ===
The introductory presentation of the first lesson in Hrodna on March 14, 2014, gathered more than 100 people.

=== Baranavičy ===
Mova Nanova in Baranavičy was opened on Saturday, March 15, 2014.

=== Niasviž ===
The first lesson of Mova Nanova in Niasviž took place on March 22, 2014, and was held by the hosts of the Minsk course Alesia Litvinouskaja and Gleb Labadzenka.

=== Brest ===
Mova Nanova in Brest for the first time took place on April 27, 2014, more than 90 people attended the lesson.

The second season of the course continued from September 6, 2014.

=== Maladziečna ===
The course opened its doors to Maladziečna students on May 7, 2014 with about 60 people attending the first lesson.

The second season of the course in Maladziečna started on September 15, 2014.

=== Mahilioŭ ===
Mahilioŭ welcomed its students on May 11, 2014 and became the 9th city to take up the linguistic initiative.

=== Viciebsk ===
The official opening of the Viciebsk branch of the language course took place at the exhibition room of the centre of history and culture - the Golden Ring of Viciebsk "Dzvina" - on May 25, 2014.

The second year of the course started on September 7, 2014.
