= Appeal Against Repressions (Belarus, 2020) =

Open letter by Belarusian scientists

The Appeal Against Repressions (Belarusian: Зварот супраць рэпрэсій), also known as the Open Letter of Scientists Against Repressions, was a significant public statement issued by members of the Belarusian scientific community in late November 2020. The appeal was a direct response to a wave of politically motivated dismissals and repressions targeting scientists and academic staff in the aftermath of the August 2020 Belarusian presidential election and the ensuing mass protests.

== Background ==
Following the disputed 2020 presidential election in Belarus, widespread protests erupted across the country. The government, led by Alexander Lukashenko, responded with a broad crackdown on civil society, including the academic sector. Academics and students who participated in peaceful protests or publicly criticized the regime faced intimidation, dismissals, arrests, and other forms of repression. The administration of the National Academy of Sciences and university leadership became instruments of this repression, often acting on directives from state authorities and security services

== Content of the Appeal ==
The open letter, signed by over 800 members of the Belarusian academic community by December 2020, expressed deep concern over the dismissal of highly qualified scientists from institutes of the National Academy of Sciences. Many of those dismissed were active in trade unions and had recently provided independent expert opinions on issues of public concern. The appeal argued that these dismissals were politically motivated and detrimental to the quality of scientific research in Belarus.

The letter highlighted that the affected scientists were reputable professionals with significant academic achievements, publications, and patents, and that their forced removal would undermine both the reputation of the academy and the broader scientific community. The authors called on the leadership of the academy and its institutes to cease politically motivated dismissals and to reinstate the affected staff members.

== List of Repressed Scientists ==
The appeal included a list of dismissed or repressed scientists, among them:

- Siarhei Besarab (Institute of General and Inorganic Chemistry)
- Katsyaryna Kryvichanina (Institute of History)
- Aliaksei Shalanda (Institute of History)
- Mikalai Volkau (Institute of History)
- Uladzimir Shypila (Institute of History)
- Andrei Radaman (Institute of History)
- Aliaksandr (Ales) Zhlutka (Institute of History)
- Tatsiana Papouskaya (Institute of History)

== Impact and Reaction ==
Despite the broad support within the academic community, there was no official response from the leadership of the National Academy of Sciences or the directors of the affected research institutes. The repressions continued, with reports indicating that from August 2020 to April 2021, more than 130 university employees and scientists in Belarus faced repressive measures, including over 50 dismissals, administrative arrests, and fines. The situation led to a significant decline in academic freedom in Belarus, as documented by international organizations and human rights groups.

The text of the appeal was translated and published in English, Russian, Portuguese, and German, reflecting international concern and solidarity with the Belarusian academic community. International academic organizations, such as the International Association of Physics Students and Scholars at Risk, issued statements supporting Belarusian scientists and condemning the crackdown on academic freedom.

== See also ==
- Video Appeal of Belarusian Scientists (2020)
- 2020 Belarusian protests
- Human rights in Belarus
