= Nasta Palazhanka =

Belarusian politician (born 1990)

- Наста Палажанка
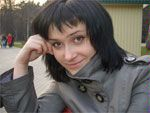
- Nasta Palazhanka at the 2011 International Women of Courage Award
- Born: 1990 (age 35–36)
- Occupation: Activist
- Known for: Young Front
- Spouse: Zmitser Dashkevich (m. 2012)

Nasta Palazhanka (Dashkevich) (Belarusian: Наста Палажанка, romanized: Nasta Pałažanka; born 1990) is an activist in the opposition youth movement in Belarus, which she joined at the age of 14. As of 2011 she is Deputy Chairperson of the Malady Front (Young Front), an NGO in Belarus. She has advocated for freedom and human rights in Belarus despite threats, harassment, and imprisonment.

She received a 2011 International Women of Courage award. However, she was unable to attend the ceremony.

As of September 2011, she was engaged to another Young Front activist, Zmitser Dashkevich. The two married when Palazhanka visited him in Hrodno prison on 26 December 2012.

In July 2022, Nasta and Zmitser Dashkevich were sentenced for participating in the 2020 protests.
