= Aliaksei Shalanda =

- Аляксей Шаланда
- Born: May 31, 1969; Hrodna, Belarusian SSR
- Education: University of Hrodna
- Known for: Research on Belarusian heraldry

Aliaksei Shalanda, Candidate of Sciences (Belarusian: Аляксей Шаланда, born 31 May 1969), is a Belarusian historian and heraldist.

== Biography ==
A. Shalanda was born in Hrodna and graduated from the University of Hrodna in 1993. In 2000 he received his Candidate of Sciences title, (dissertation thesis: Heraldry of the nobility of Belarus in the second half of 16th century - 18th century, Belarusian: Шляхецкая геральдыка Беларусі ў другой палове ХVІ–ХVІІІ ст.).

Since 2008, A. Shalanda has been working at the Institute of History of the National Academy of Sciences of Belarus. In 2010-2012 he was head of the Heraldry and Numismatics Sector of the Special Historical Research and Informational-Analytical Work Department of the institute. Since 2012, he has been Head of the Special Historical Research and Informational-Analytical Work Department.

In 2015–2020, he was Head of Department of Genealogy, Heraldry and Numismatics of the Institute of History of the National Academy of Sciences of Belarus.

In December 2020, the Department of Heraldry, Genealogy and Numismatics led by Professor Aliaksei Shalanda was closed and he himself along several of his colleagues was fired, allegedly for supporting nationwide protests against the regime of Alexander Lukashenko that followed a controversial presidential election in August 2020. A. Shalanda gave his expert opinion on the request of a court regarding the historical white-red-white flag of Belarus, a popular protest symbol, pointing out that there was no ground for the police to prosecute citizens for the public display of the flag. The firing of Professor Shalanda and his colleagues was met with criticism from the Belarusian academic community, which in its collective statements, such as the Appeal Against Repressions.

== Selected works ==
- Сімвалы і гербы зямель Беларусі ў Х–ХVІІІ ст. геральдычна-сфрагістычныя нарысы [Symbols and coats of arms of the lands of Belarus in the 10th-18th centuries], 2012.
- Таямнічы свет беларускіх гербаў. Шляхецкая геральдыка Вялікага княства Літоўскага [The mysterious world of Belarusian coats of arms. The heraldry of the nobility of the Grand Duchy of Lithuania], 2014.
- Код Францішка Скарыны. Геральдычныя матэрыялы ў пражскіх і віленскіх выданнях беларускага першадрукара [The Code of Frantsishak Skaryna. Heraldic materials in the Prague and Vilnius publishings of the Belarusian book printer], 2017.

== Links ==
- Publications at Worldcat.org
