= List of deaths related to the 2020–2021 Belarusian protests =

This is a list of people who died (were killed or died in unknown circumstances, or because of ill-treatment during detainment or in prisons) as a result of the 2020–2021 Belarusian protests, before, during, and after the 2020 presidential elections:

1. Aliaksandr Taraikouski (Alexander Taraikovsky, Аляксандр Тарайкоўскі, Александр Тарайковский) was shot and died on August 10, 2020, in Minsk.
2. Aliaksandr Vikhor (Alexander Vikhor, Аляксандр Віхор, Александр Вихор) died after being detained on August 12, 2020, in Gomel.
3. Mikita Kryucou (Nikita Krivtsov, Нікіта Крыўцоў, Никита Кривцов) went missing on August 12, 2020 and found dead 10 days later in Minsk.
4. Artsyom Parukau (Artem Parukov, Арцём Парукаў, Артём Паруков) got hit by a car on the way back home after protesting on August 16, 2020, in Minsk.
5. Kanstantsin Shyshmakou (Konstontin Shishmakov, Канстанцін Шышмакоў, Константин Шишмаков), a member of an election commission in Vawkavysk, went missing on Aug 15 was found dead in Hrodna region on August 18, 2020.
6. Henadz Shutau (Gennady Shutov, Генадзь Шутаў, Геннадий Шутов) was shot by serviceman of the 5th Spetsnaz Brigade of the Armed Forces of Belarus, Captain Roman Gavrilov, on August 11, 2020, in Brest. He died in a hospital in Minsk on August 19, 2020.
7. Raman Bandarenka (Roman Bondarenko, Раман Бандарэнка, Роман Бондареко) died in a hospital after being detained near his home in Minsk on November 12, 2020.
8. Siarhey Shchatsinka (Sergey Schetinko, Сяргей Шчацінка, Сергей Щетинко) got COVID-19 while being in prison and died from its consequences on December 11, 2020.
9. Vitold Ashurak (Vitold Ashurok, Вiтольд Ашурак, Витольд Ашурок) died shortly after being imprisoned on May 21, 2021.
10. Dzmitry Stakhouski (Dmitry Stakhovsky, Дзьмітрый Стахоўскі, Дмитрий Стаховский), an 18-year old teenager committed suicide on May 25, 2021, after being investigated for taking part in "mass riots". In his parting text he wrote: "If the moral pressure on me had not continued, I would not have dared to do such a terrible act as suicide. But my strength was running out."
11. Andrei Zeltser (Andrey Zeltser, Андрэй Зельцэр, Андрей Зельцер), an IT manager, and a KGB agent were killed in a shootout during a raid of Zeltser's apartment in Minsk on September 21, 2021.
12. Alena Amelina (Elena Amelina, Алена Амеліна, Елена Амелина) got COVID-19 while being in prison and died from its consequences in October 2021.
13. Dzmitry Dudoits (Dmitry Dudoits, Дзьмітрый Дудойць, Дмитрий Дудойть), a resident of Smarhoń, was imprisoned for insulting of a representative of authority, and committed suicide by jumping off the bridge while serving his term in the open air prison in Mahiloŭ on January 5, 2022
14. Uladzimir Krysionak (Vladimir Krysenok, Уладзімір Крысёнак, Владимир Крысёнок) committed suicide the day after he was released from prison on May 30, 2022
15. Mikalai Klimovich (Nikolay Klimovich, Мікалай Клімовіч, Николай Климович), a 61-year old blogger; had a severe heart stroke in the past and died in prison in Vitebsk region on May 5, 2023, 2 weeks after being arrested for insulting Lukashenka.
16. Ales Pushkin (Алесь Пушкін, Алесь Пушкин), a 57-year old artist and performer; he was put in prison and died in a prison hospital in Hrodna.
17. Dzmitry Sarokin (Dmitry Sorokin, Дзьмітрый Сарокін, Дмитрий Сорокин), a 37-year poet from Lida, he was detained and died in prison because of a heart disease on June 1, 2023
18. Vadzim Khrasko (Vadim Krasko, Вадзім Храсько, Вадим Храсько), a 50-year-old political prisoner, died of pneumonia in Viciebsk colony No. 3 on January 9, 2024. He was sentenced to three years in prison for several donations, despite the fact that the man had a serious illness.
19. Ihar Lednik (Igor Lednik, Ігар Леднік, Игорь Ледник), social activist, was sentenced to three years of imprisonment for "slandering Lukashenka". He died in a prison hospital in Kaliadzičy in February 2024.
20. Aliaksandr Kulinich (Alexander Kulinich, Аляксандр Кулініч, Александр Кулинич), died in the Brest pre-trial detention center on April 9, 2024.
21. Dmitry Shlethauer (Dmitry Shletkhauer, Дзмітрый Шлетхаўэр, Дмитрий Шлетхауэр), a citizen of the Russian Federation, died in Mahilioŭ penal colony No. 15 on November 1, 2024.
22. Valiantsin Shtermer (Valentin Shtermer, Валянцін Штэрмер, Валентин Штермер), died in Škloŭ penal colony No. 17 in early 2025.
23. Andrei Padniabenny (Andrei Padnyabenniy, Андрэй Паднябенны, Андрей Поднебенный), a 36-year-old Russian citizen, died in Mahiloŭ penal colony No. 15 on September 3, 2025.

The authorities and the main persons of the Ministry of Internal Affairs never said that people died at the hands of police representatives.
