= Over Barrier =

Over Barrier Над Бар'ерам
- Chairperson: Cimafiej Drančuk
- Vice-Chairman: Źmicier Kaśpiarovič
- Founded: 22 May 2007
- Headquarters: Minsk, Belarus

Over Barrier (Belarusian: Над Бар'ерам) is a Belarusian committee on protection of prisoners' rights. It was created on May 22, 2007.

== History ==
On May 22, 2007, in Vilnius, Lithuania it was announced about creation of the Belarusian Committee on the protection of prisoners’ rights «OVER BARRIER» (BCPPR «OVER BARRIER») The decision to organize the constituent assembly on the territory of Lithuania was made due impossibility of organization registration in Belarus.

20 citizens of Belarus, who in different situations, faced "problems and imperfection of penitentiary systems" of Belarus - had taken part in the constituent assembly.

The organizing committee on creation of the BCPPR «OVER BARRIER» included former political prisoners Cimafiej Drančuk and Źmicier Kaśpiarovič, public activists Vieranika Vyhoŭskaja and Kryścina Šacikava, and other participants of the constituent assembly.

The constituent assembly has charged Cimafiej Drančuk and Vieranika Vyhoŭskaja to prepare necessary documents for registration of the BCPPR «OVER BARRIER» in the Republic of Lithuania.

== Leaders of BCPPR "Over Barrier" ==
- Cimafiej Drančuk
- Źmicier Kaśpiarovič
- Vieranika Vyhoŭskaja

== Publications about creation of the BCPPR «Over Barrier» ==
- https://www.svaboda.org/content/Article/758330.html
- https://www.svaboda.org/content/Article/759198.html
- http://www.nv-online.info/index.php?c=nw&i=4127
- http://www.nv-online.info/index.php?c=ar&i=4239
- http://www.nv-online.info/index.php?c=ar&i=4374
- http://www.belgazeta.by/20070604.22/480264471
- http://www.camarade.biz/page/1/bo/2020/article.html
- http://www.euramost.org/?artc=12202
- http://www.maidan.org.ua/static/news/2007/1180381826.html
- http://www.prison.org/smi/05062007.shtml
- http://spletni.ru/view_news.php?id=366065
- http://21.by/news/read1.php?id=158571
- http://telegraf.by/belarus/2007/05/29/barier/
- http://za.nashih.info/node/560

== Publications under the first information on violations of rights ==
- http://www.charter97.org/bel/news/2007/06/05/grubo
- Article title
- http://www.belaruspartisan.org/bp-forte/?page=100&backPage=13&news=13384&newsPage=0
- http://www.nv-online.info/index.php?c=ar&i=7146
- http://www.camarade.biz/page/1/bo/1858/article.html
- http://www.kozylin.com/node/6397
- https://www.svaboda.org/content/Article/822772.html
- http://spring96.org/ru/news/19478/
- Article title
- Article title
- Article title
- https://naviny.by/rubrics/society/2007/12/13/ic_articles_116_154454/
- http://news.open.by/333/2007-12-13/43561/
- https://www.charter97.org/be/news/2007/12/14/2404/
- http://www.qwas.ru/belarus/ucpb/id_85772/
- http://www.belaruspartisan.org/bp-forte/?page=100&backPage=21&news=20248&newsPage=0
- http://nrs.ru/articles/22019.html
- http://www.newsdate.by/society_32155.html
- Article title
- http://spring96.org/files/book/conditions_of_detention_2008_en.pdf
