= Vitold Ashurak =

Belarusian political prisoner (1970–2021)

- Вітольд Ашурак
- Born: 13 October 1970
- Died: 21 May 2021 (aged 50)
- Occupation: Democracy activist
- Organization: Partyja BNF
- Awards: Medal of the Order of the Pahonia

Vitold Ašurak (Belarusian: Вітольд Міхайлавіч Ашурак; Russian: Витольд Михайлович Ашурок; 13 October 1970 – 21 May 2021) was a Belarusian opposition political and ecological activist. He took part in the protests against alleged fraud in the 2020 presidential elections, was sentenced to five years in prison. Belarusian human rights defender organizations recognized him as a political prisoner. He died shortly after being imprisoned under suspicious circumstances, from an unidentified cause.

== Biography ==
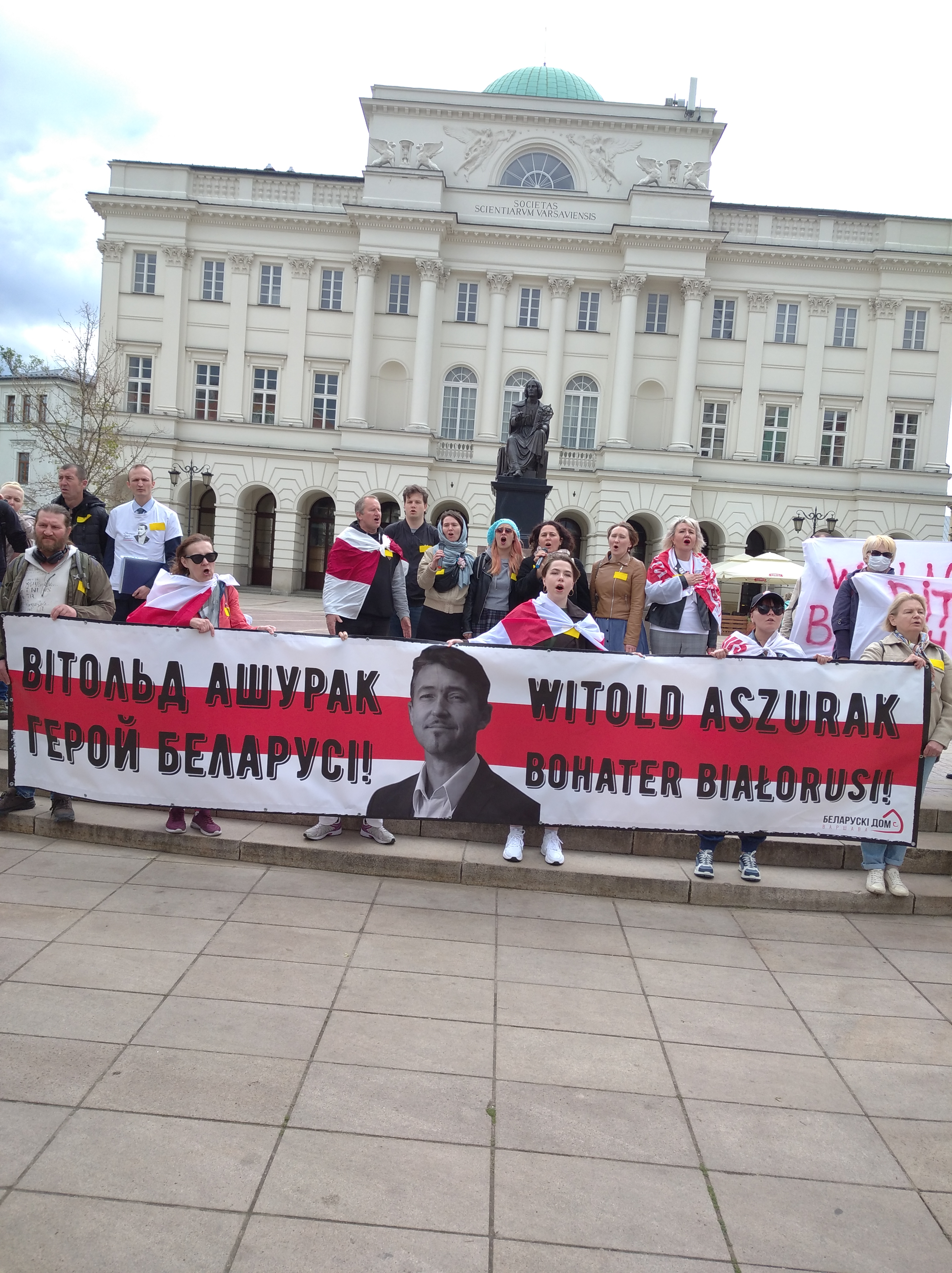
Banner with Vitold Ashurak in Warsaw.

External images
- Photo of Ashurak around 2020
- Ashurak around 2018

Ashurak was born in Aharodniki, Lida district. He worked at the "Nyoman" glassworks in Byarozawka (Lida district) as a glassblower. He was a local activist of BPF Party and "For Freedom" movement. He repeatedly took part in local and parliamentary elections. He also campaigned against the expansion of the glassworks for ecological reasons and took part in the commemoration of victims of 1863–64 uprising. In 2016, the court fined him for organizing an unauthorized single picket in Byarozawka against the negative environmental effect of the glass wool production. In 2019, he attracted media attention to unauthorized discharge of untreated wastewater into Dzitva river.

On 9 August 2020, Ashurak took part in a peaceful protest against rigged election in Lida near the local administration office, and was arrested. On 19 September he was arrested again and was accused of "organization and preparation of actions that grossly violate public order, or active participation in them" (Criminal Code article 342, part 1) and "violence or threat of violence against an employee of the internal affairs bodies" (article 364). The judge Maksim Filatov in Lida held the trial behind closed doors, claiming a "state security threat" as a reason. On 18 January 2021, Ashurak was sentenced to five years in prison. He also had to pay Br 1,000 (US$390) as a compensation for moral damage to a police officer (who was found to be a victim) and Br 81 (US$31) as a compensation for his medications. At that time it was the longest term of imprisonment for participants of the protests.

Journalist and fellow "For Freedom" activist Volha (Volia) Bykouskaja suggested that Ashurak got the long sentence term because the authorities tried to suppress the regional protests in the first place. On 27 January 2021, 11 Belarusian human rights defender organizations recognized Ashurak as a political prisoner. Member of Dáil Éireann (Irish parliament) Seán Haughey took godparenthood over Ashurak.

Ashurak was imprisoned in the correctional colony No. 17 in Shklow. In one of his last letters he claimed that the prison administration forced him to wear well-visible yellow tag (badge) on his clothes.

On 21 May 2021, Ashurak's relatives were told that he died in prison at Shklow. Originally, cardiac arrest was named as a cause of death. His wife claimed that Ashurak previously had no heart illnesses.

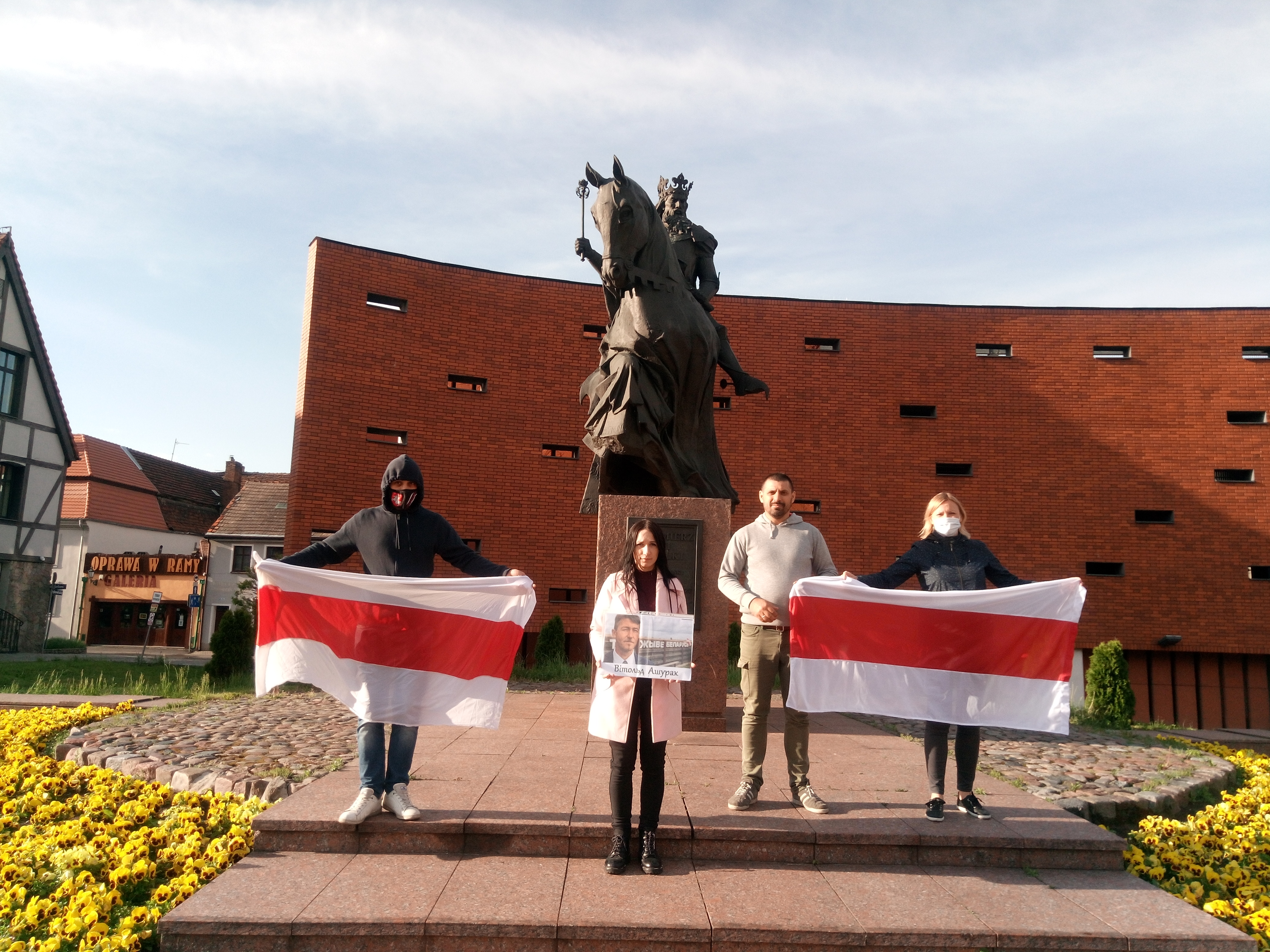
Meeting in memory of Ashurak in Bydgoszcz, Poland. 22 May 2021

On 25 May 2021, his body was transferred to relatives with a bandaged head. According to his brother, he was told that the body fell from the morgue refrigerator. On 25 May 2021, Investigative Committee of Belarus published a video mounted of at least two parts made probably in a solitary cell (Russian: ШИЗО, Штрафной изолятор — ShIZO, Punishment isolator) with Ashurak falling twice for no visible reason. The committee also said that Ashurak didn't have any health complaints and refused medical help and hospitalization. The relatives had a preliminary death certificate with an unidentified cause of death (ICD-10 code R99 "Ill-defined and unknown cause of mortality").

Ashurak was buried on 26 May 2021. According to his last will, his body was covered with a white-red-white flag.

== Commemoration ==
A Polish singer Maciej Wróblewski dedicated a song Belarusian Path - We Will Prevail (Polish: Białoruski Szlak - PERAMOŻEM) to Vitold Ashurak. It was premiered on 3 August 2021.

On October 31, 2021, a memorial cross in honor of Vitold Ashurak was unveiled in the Belarusian church of Antwerpen, Belgium.

In March 2023, he was posthumously awarded the Medal of the Order of the Pahonia.

His death is the symbolic basis for establishing 21 May as the Day of Political Prisoners in Belarus.

== See also ==
- List of deaths related to the 2020 Belarusian protests
