= Viktar Čajčyc =

Belarusian politician (born 1960)

- Born: 24 August 1960 (age 66)
- Education: Belarusian State University
- Occupations: lawyer, politician
- Organization: Republican Bar Association (Belarus)

Viktar Čajčyc (Belarusian: Віктар Іванавіч Чайчыц, also known as Viktar Chaichyts; born 24 August 1960) is a Belarusian lawyer and politician.

== Career ==
Čajčyc graduated from the Belarusian State University and started his legal career as a trainee at the Baranavičy district court. He later served as a judge and worked as a departmental head at the Ministry of Justice and as an advocate.

He headed the Bar Association of the Minsk Region between 2002 and 2013 before becoming the head of Republican Bar Association.

In 2016 he became a member of the Belarusian parliament and was re-elected in 2019.

== Controversies ==
In 2012 a letter by Čajčyc was published in which he ‘recommended’ advocates under his supervision to clear their statements with officials before speaking to the press. Critics considered this letter as an attempt to constrain the freedom of advocates and impede their work in defending clients in political cases.

In December 2020 Čajčyc suggested that “the councils of local bar associations should constantly follow online publications by counsels, including on their social media accounts, for their compliance with the current legislation, and, if necessary, provide assistance in the correct and professional presentation of materials on the issues of the legal profession”. Such statements were regarded as attempts to censor the freedom of expression.

On 4 March 2021 in a speech to the Minsk City Bar Association, Čajčyc expressed support for the cruel treatment of participants in the 2020 political protests and urged advocates not to publicise violations of human rights by the Belarusian courts and to refrain from expressing political views.
