= Tsimafei Dranchuk =

Belarusian prisoner rights activist

Tsimafei Dranchuk (Belarusian: Цімафей Дранчук) is the leader of the unregistered Belarusian prisoners' rights organization Over Barrier.

From 1996 to 1997 he studied at the Belarus humanitarian lyceum at BHECC (later National lyceum named after Yakub Kolas). In 1998, as an external student he finished high school No.33, and in 1999 began studying journalism at the Belarusian state university. He was expelled in 2001 from the university for political activity.

From 1996 to 2000 Tsimafei was engaged in communicative maintenance of the newspaper Belavezhskaya Pushcha, and in 1997-1998 worked as the press-secretary for the city trade union of businessmen "Sadruzhnasc". As well until 2000 he was among most active members of the youth organization Malady Front". Tsimafey was the editor of the unregistered newsletter of Malady Front Moladzevy Vesnik ("Youth news"). In 1999 he actively participated in the alternative presidential elections organized by the opposition as press-secretary for Michael Chigir.

From 2000 to 2001 he was chairman of the youth organization Maladzezhnaja Salidarnasc ("Youth solidarity"), and from 2001 until 2004 coordinated work of the "Zubr" movement in Minsk.

Since 2004 Tsimafey became the activist of Andrey Klimov's movement, he was one of organizers of the "Revolution!" on March 25, 2005. Cooperated with PI "Partnership".

In 2005 Tsimafey has entered the European humanitarian university liquidated by the Belarusian authorities and re-open in Vilnius, on faculty of international law.

On February 21, 2006, he was arrested and placed in investigator isolator of KGB together with Enira Branitskaja, Mikalay Astrejka and Aliaxandar Shalajka. He was accused in violation of article 193 part 2 of the Criminal Code. Amnesty International designated him a prisoner of conscience.

On December 26, 2006, he was released from Correctional Facility-1 in Minsk.

On May 22, 2007, Dranchuk, together with political prisoner Dzmitry Kasperovich and other public activists, declared the creation of the BCPPR "Above the barrier".
