= Ihar Lednik =

Belarusian opposition activist (1960–2024)

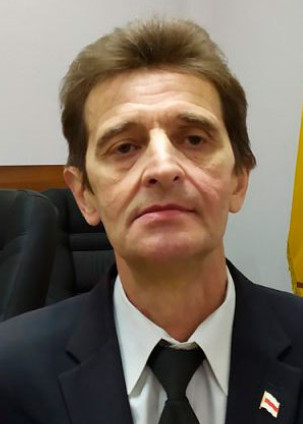
- Lednik in 2022
- Born: 12 December 1960
- Died: c. 20 February 2024 (aged 63)
- Political party: Belarusian Social Democratic Party (Assembly)

Ihar Aleksandrovich Lednik (Belarusian: Ігар Аляксандравіч Леднік; 12 December 1960 – c. 20 February 2024) was a Belarusian opposition activist and political prisoner. In 2022, he was sentenced to three years imprisonment for the "defamation" of Belarusian President Alexander Lukashenko in an article in the newspaper of the Belarusian Social Democratic Party (BSDP). His health severely deteriorated while he was in prison and he died in custody after undergoing surgery for an issue involving his gastrointestinal tract.

== Biography ==
Lednik was born on 12 December 1960. A former member of the Belarusian Social Democratic Party (BSDP), Lednik was detained on 12 April 2022 and initially sentenced to a three-year sentence for "insulting" the dictator Alexander Lukashenko by writing an article in the BSDP party magazine. In May 2022, the Viasna Human Rights Centre and other Belarusian human rights organizations recognized him as a political prisoner.

According to BSDP party members, Lednik advocated for the abolition of the Union State between Belarus and Russia and believed that the Budapest Memorandum was violated by Belarus. He also believed the 13th Belarusian Supreme Council being discontinued led to the establishment of a dictatorship in Belarus and undermined security in the region.

He was reportedly routinely abused in prison and his health had severely deteriorated in prison. Lednik was in poor health due to heart problems, and eventually died in custody after undergoing an operation of the gastrointestinal tract. It was reported on 20 February 2024 that he died of cardiac arrest in a Minsk district hospital, to which he was taken from a penal colony in Babruysk. His exact date of death was uncertain. Viasna said Lednik was the fifth political prisoner to die in a Belarusian prison in less than two years. Another opposition figure, Vadzim Khrasko, died of pneumonia in a penal colony one month earlier after he had not received the necessary medical care in custody according to human rights groups.

Fellow Belarusian political activist Sviatlana Tsikhanouskaya blamed Belarusian authorities for Ledkin's death. She stated authorities were perfectly aware of his disability when he was sent to the colony, and his name was included in a list of people who should be released due to health or age. She wrote on Telegram about the death, calling it "an injustice and an unbelievable tragedy" and further saying "the regime kills in prison Belarusians who wanted to change life in their country for the better".
