= Eduard Palčys =

Belarusian activist (born 1990)

- Эдуард Пальчыс
- Born: 1990 (age 35–36); Lida, Belarus
- Education: Belarusian State University (History)
- Occupation: Blogger
- Known for: Political prisoner

Eduard Palčys (Belarusian: Эдуард Пальчыс, b. 1990) is a Belarusian activist and political prisoner.

== Early years ==
Palčys was born in Lida. At school he became a recipient of a grant for gifted children and subsequently read history at the Belarusian State University.

== Activism and persecution ==
Following Russia's invasion of the Crimea, Palčys created the website site 1863x.com which was "conceived as a response to those Russian propagandists who began to attack Belarus in 2014." On account of his publications, Palčys was detained in Russia and extradited to Belarus. He was recognised as a political prisoner from January to November 2016. In August 2016, a court in Minsk found 9 materials from the website to be “extremist” - which human right organisations declared “a permissible form of expression [which] may not be prosecuted under the criminal law”.

During the 2020-2021 Belarusian protests Palčys was arrested and sentenced to 30 days in jail on a charge of violating the law on mass gatherings. After serving his sentence in October 2020, he was not released and instead charged again, this time with incitement of social hatred, organisation of mass disorder, organisation of activities that disrupt social order, and calls for activities that aim to damage the country's national security.

On 17 December 2021 Palčys was sentenced to 13 years in prison.

Palčys was released and de-facto exiled to Lithuania on the order of Alexander Lukashenko on March 19, 2026 as part of a deal with Washington that lifted some U.S. sanctions.
