= Mikalay Autukhovich =

Belarusian businessman and pro-democracy activist

- Born: 7 January 1963 (age 63)
- Occupation: taxi company owner
- Known for: political activism, 2006 imprisonment

Mikalay Autukhovich (Belarusian: Мікалай Аўтуховіч, born 7 January 1963) is a Belarusian businessman and political dissident who has twice been imprisoned by the government of Belarus. Belarusian courts have found him guilty of tax evasion and terrorism, but international human rights organization Amnesty International has stated that he is a prisoner of conscience imprisoned solely for peaceful protest.

== Life ==
Prior to his arrest, Autukhovich worked at the Vaukavysk-based taxi company Nika-taxi 22222. He also ran as an opposition candidate in the 2004 Belarusian parliamentary elections.

On 7 July 2006, he was arrested and charged with "large scale tax evasion and running business without a registration and a license". He was found guilty on both counts and sentenced to three-and-a-half years' home arrest. He was released in early 2009 following "pressure from the European Union and the United States".

Shortly after his release, he was charged with involvement in a 2005 arson case, along with two other activists. Authorities later added additional charges of illegal weapons possession and "preparing a terrorist act". Autukhovich responded to the charges with a three-month hunger strike that lasted from February to April of that year, demanding that he be allowed to face to trial. In May, Autukhovich was tried, and while the terrorism charge against him was dropped, he was convicted of illegal possession of weapons and ammunition and given a five-year, two-month prison sentence.

Autukhovich served his sentence in a labor camp in Ivatsevichy. He reportedly lacked legal representation after his lawyer, Paval Sapelka, was disbarred for representing opposition presidential candidate Andrei Sannikov in court. In December 2011, prison officials reported that Autukhovich had attempted suicide by slashing his wrists, but had survived and was in stable condition. According to the Viasna Human Rights Centre, following the incident, he was moved into a "closed regime", largely isolating him from contact with other prisoners.

Radio Free Europe has described Autukhovich as being regarded as a political prisoner by "activists at home and abroad". Amnesty International has named him a prisoner of conscience and called for his immediate release. Viasna and other human rights organizations in Belarus have also recognized Mikalay Autukhovich as a political prisoner.

=== Arrest in 2020 ===
In December 2020, Autukhovich was arrested again. Investigators accuse Autukhovich of conducting several arson attacks against vehicles belonging to police officers and planning of attacks on their property. Autukhovich has rejected all of the charges, he has been on a hunger strike in prison for 26 days. Twelve people, including a priest and his family, a retiree and a 62-year-old political prisoner with a disability, were prosecuted along with Autukhovich. Some of them didn't even know Autukhovich personally. The trial was closed and all proceedings held in closed sessions. Human rights activists and experts call the case completely fabricated, and the process — not standing up to any criticism.

On October 17, 2022, the Hrodna Regional Court sentenced Autukhovich to 25 years in jail. A total of 12 defendants received 197 years in prison, the heaviest political sentence in modern Belarus.

On 31 March 2023, the Supreme Court of Belarus reviewed the appeals of the defendants of Autukhovich's case. Although the court decided to clear Avtukhovich of one of the charges due to expiry of the period of limitation, the overall sentence remained unchanged.
