= Andrei Kim =

Andrei Ivanavich Kim (Belarusian: Андрэй Іванавіч Кім, born February 26, 1986, in Minsk, Byelorussian SSR, Soviet Union) is a Belarusian youth and Christian social activist sentenced to 1.5 years imprisonment and considered by many as political prisoner.

Andrei is a leader of the unregistered democratic youth organization Inicyjatyva that opposes president Alexander Lukashenko.

He was arrested after taking part in a demonstration on January 10, 2008. Following his arrest he was accused of assaulting a police officer.

On April 22, 2008, Andrei was sentenced to 1.5 years in jail.
