= Zmitser Dashkevich =

Belarusian pro-democracy activist

Zmitser Dashkevich Зміцер Дашкевіч
- Born: Дзмітрый Вячаслававіч Дашкевіч; Dmitry Vyachaslavavich Dashkevich; 20 July 1981 (age 44); Yelsk District, Gomel Region
- Occupation: Political activist
- Organization: Young Front
- Known for: Dissident politics, imprisonment
- Spouse: Nasta Palazhanka

Dmitry "Zmitser" Vyachaslavavich Dashkevich (Belarusian: Дзмі́трый «Змі́цер» Вячасла́вавіч Дашке́віч; Russian: Дми́трий Вячесла́вович Дашке́вич; born July 20, 1981, in Yelsk District, Gomel Region) is a Belarusian politician and former leader of the unregistered youth opposition movement Young Front (from 2004 to 2017).

== Life ==
In November 2006, Dashkevich was found guilty of "illegal political activity" by a Belarusian court and sentenced to 18 months in prison. Amnesty International (AI) declared him a prisoner of conscience, and the U.S. government condemned the verdict.

In March 2011, he and fellow Young Front activist Eduard Lobau were found guilty of assault one day in advance of a disputed presidential election. The Young Front activists stated that the case against them was politically motivated. Dashkevich was sentenced to two years in prison, and Lobau to four. AI again named the pair prisoners of conscience.

According to Amnesty International, Dashkevich was offered a presidential pardon in September 2011 if he would confess his guilt, but he refused. On 18 July 2012, Belarusian authorities announced that a new investigation had been opened against Dashkevich for his "systematic and aggressive refusal to follow the instructions of the penitentiary administration." On 28 August 2012, Dashkevich was found guilty in an in camera trial, and another year was added to his prison sentence. On 30 October, a court ordered Dashkevich's transfer to a maximum security prison. Human Rights Watch reported that he "was being subjected to routine prison abuse, including verbal abuse, arbitrary punishments, and threats of torture, rape, and murder".

As of September 2011, Dashkevich was engaged to another Young Front activist, Nasta Palazhanka. The two married when Palazhanka visited him in Hrodno prison on 26 December 2012. Authorities stated that the couple would be allowed one more two-hour visit before Dashkevich's release, scheduled for August 2013.

He was released on August 28, 2013, after having completed his sentence.

On April 23, 2022, Dashkevich was detained after a search of his apartment. On July 14, 2022, the Maskoŭski District Court of Minsk sentenced him to 18 months of imprisonment in a penal colony. Viasna Human Rights Centre recognizes Dashkevich as a political prisoner.

Dashkevich was supposed to be released from the colony in July 2023, but he was detained in a new criminal case. In October of the same year, he was sentenced to a year in a strict regime colony on the charge of malicious disobedience to the colony administration. In May 2024, a new criminal case was opened against Dashkevich, and at the end of September it became known that he was sentenced to a year and 3 months in a strict regime prison on charges of acts that grossly violate public order and malicious disobedience to the demands of the prison administration.

On September 11, 2025, after being pardoned, he was de-facto deported to Lithuania along with fifty other Belarusian political prisoners.
