= Politics of Belarus =

Belarus is an authoritarian state in which political power is concentrated around Alexander Lukashenko, who has remained president since the country's first presidential election following the dissolution of the Soviet Union. Under his rule elections are openly rigged, while the parliament is staffed by regime loyalists and functions as a rubber-stamp legislature. The political system retains features characteristic of the Soviet model of governance.

De jure the politics of Belarus takes place in a framework of a presidential republic with a bicameral parliament. The President of Belarus is the head of state. Executive power is nominally exercised by the government, at its top sits a ceremonial prime minister, appointed directly by the President. Legislative power is de jure vested in the bicameral parliament, the National Assembly, however the president may enact decrees that are executed the same way as laws, for undisputed time.

During Soviet times, Belarus had a communist political system that was constitutionally defined as a Marxist–Leninist single party socialist republic guided in part by the political ideas of Karl Marx, one of the fathers of historical materialism, as well as by Friedrich Engels and Vladimir Lenin. The sole legal governing party was the Communist Party of Byelorussia (CPB), which was permitted according to the constitution.

Belarus' declaration of sovereignty on 27 July 1990 did not stem from long-held political aspirations, but from reactions to domestic and foreign events. In particular, Ukraine's declaration of independence led the leaders of then Belarusian SSR to realize that the Soviet Union was on the brink of dissolving.

After the establishment of a Republic on August 25, 1991, Stanislav Shushkevich was selected to be the first Belarusian leader and held this position until 1994. Shushkevich hoped to guide the country away from its Soviet past and supported social democratic reforms. His successor, Alexander Lukashenko, upon assuming office in 1994, began to re-instate Soviet-era functions and reintroduced the symbols from Soviet Belarus.

Lukashenko heads an authoritarian government and has often been referred to as "Europe's last dictator". Elections are not considered to be free and fair by international monitors, opponents of the regime are repressed, and the media is not free.

== Political background ==
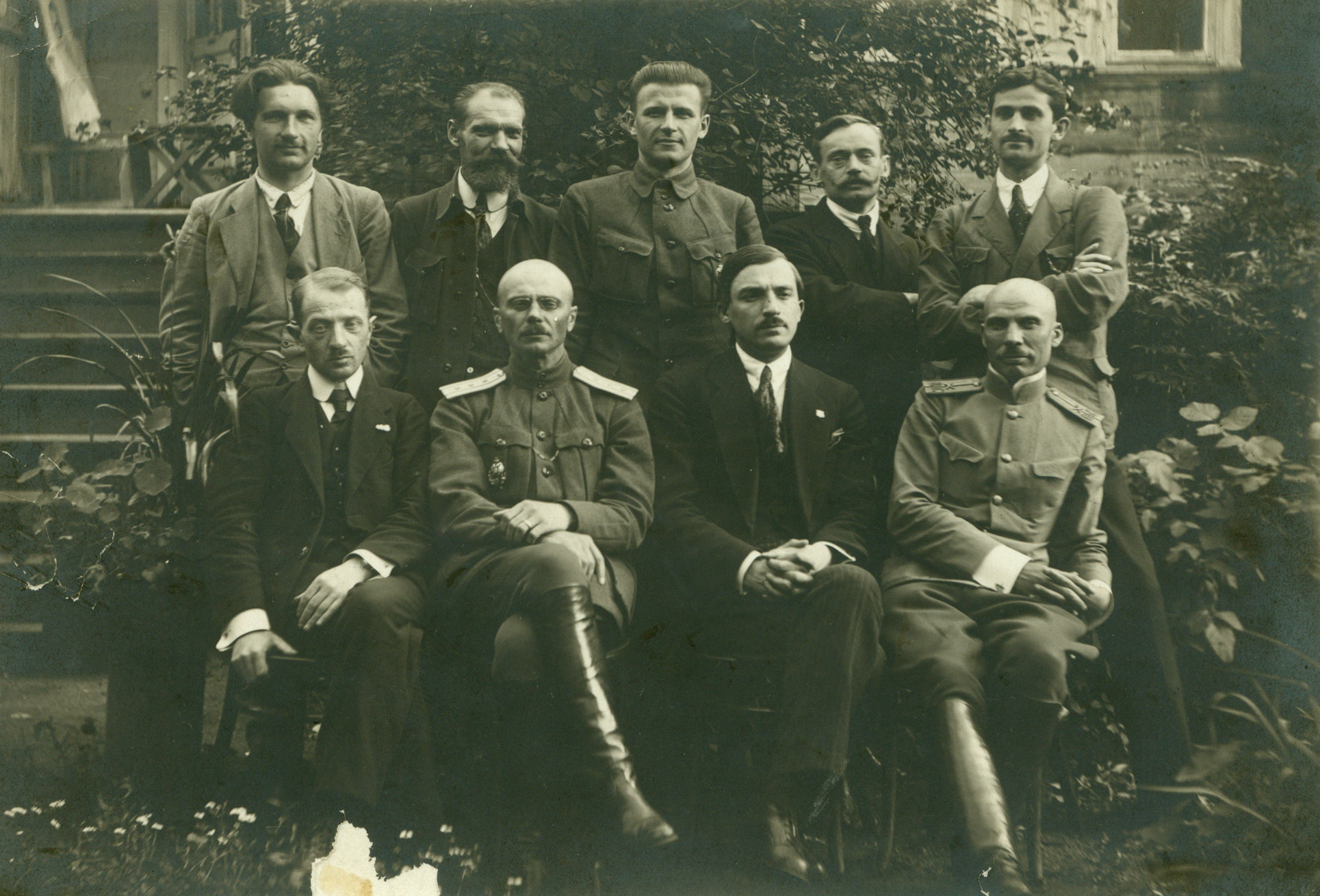
The first government of the Belarusian Democratic Republic, 1918

=== Independence from the Russian Empire ===
The first attempt to establish a sovereign Belarusian state in modern history came in early 1918 with the declaration of independence of the Belarusian Democratic Republic. The short-lived state was destroyed by the Soviet invasion in 1919. The Rada of the Belarusian Democratic Republic exists as a government in exile since then.

The Bolsheviks created a puppet Soviet government of Belarus in Smolensk. In 1922, the Soviet Socialist Republic of Belarus joined the USSR together with Soviet-controlled Russia, Ukraine and Transcaucasia.

=== Independence from the USSR ===
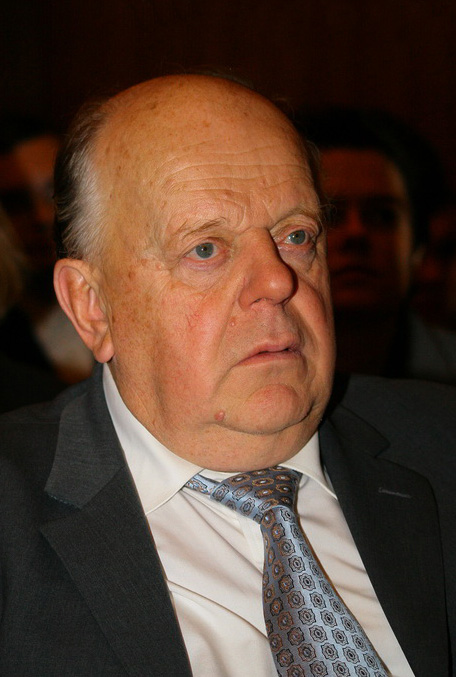
Stanislav Shushkevich, the first head of state of independent Belarus

The March 4, 1990, elections to the republic's Supreme Soviet gave the country a legislature that was little different from previous legislatures: only 10 percent of the deputies were members of the opposition. But for the most part, the populace seemed satisfied with the new deputies (see List of Members of the Belarusian Parliament, 1990–1995), and the Belarusian Popular Front's (BPF) calls for independence and efforts at nation-building failed to stir up the same strong emotions as movements in neighboring Ukraine and the Baltic States. Although the Supreme Soviet of the Byelorussian SSR adopted the Declaration of State Sovereignty of the Belarusian Soviet Socialist Republic on July 27, 1990 (some two weeks after Russia had declared its own sovereignty), the March 1991 referendum held throughout the Soviet Union showed that 83 percent of Belarusians wanted to preserve the Soviet Union.

Political change in Belarus came about only after the August 1991 coup d'état in Moscow, and the subsequent reaction by the Central Committee of the Communist Party of Belarus: the CPB displayed its satisfaction at the coup attempt by abstaining from issuing a condemnation of the coup plotters. Following the coup's collapse and the full restorations of independence of Estonia and Latvia, and the declaration of independence by Ukraine, Belarus declared its own independence on August 25 by giving its existing declaration of sovereignty the status of a constitutional document. On August 28, Prime Minister Vyacheslav Kebich declared that he and his entire cabinet had "suspended" their CPB membership. The next day, both the Russian and the Belarusian governments suspended the activities of the communist party.

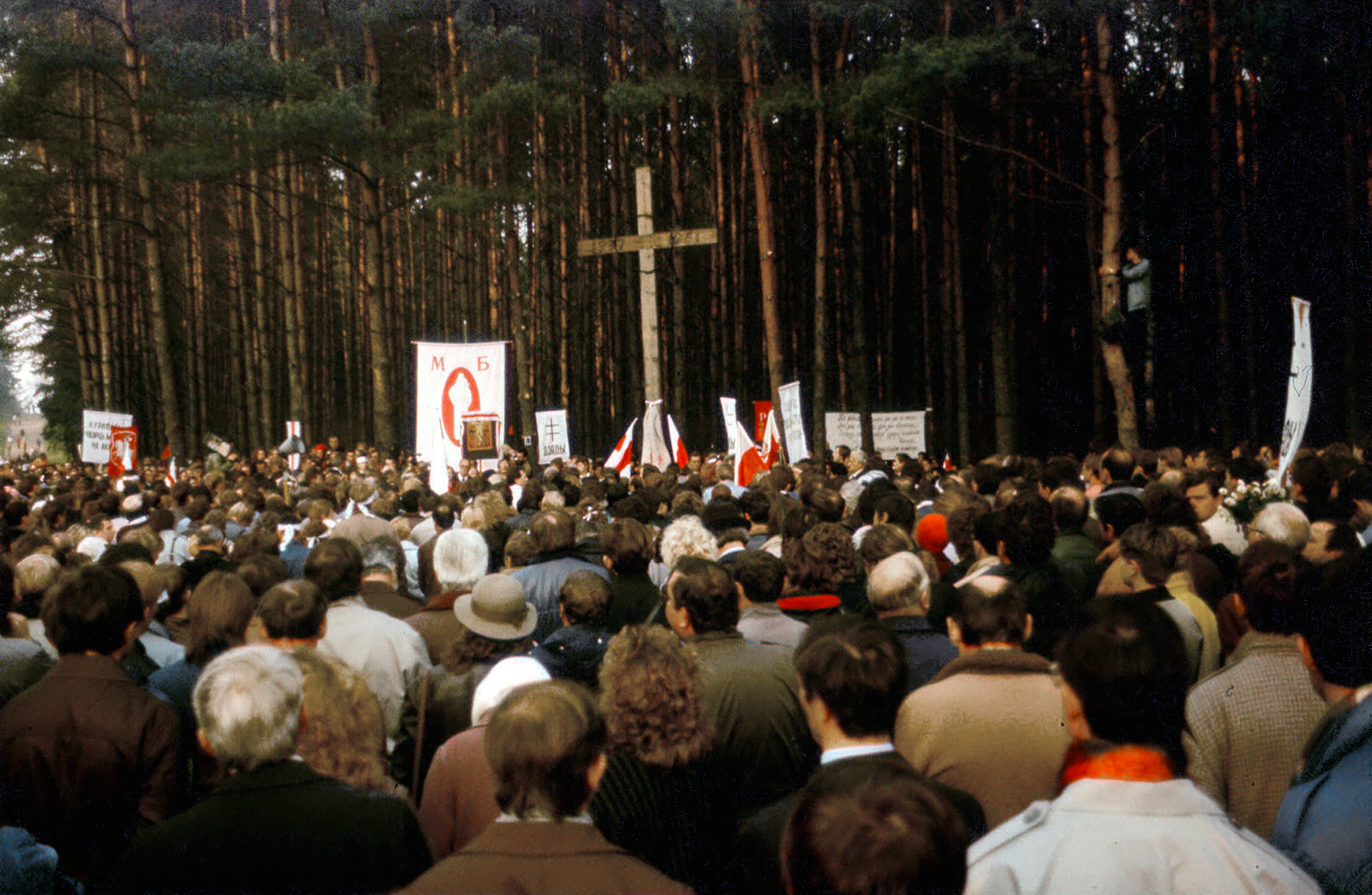
A demonstration by the Belarusian Popular Front in Kurapaty, 1989

== Political parties ==
Stanislav Shushkevich observed at the beginning of 1993 that almost 60 percent of Belarusians did not support any political party, only 3.9 percent of the electorate backed the communist party, and only 3.8 percent favored the BPF. The influence of other parties was much lower.

The Communist Party of Belarus (CPB), part of the Communist Party of the Soviet Union (CPSU), claimed to rule the Belarusian SSR in the name of the proletariat for the entire duration of the republic's existence. For most of this period, it sought to control all aspects of government and society and to infuse political, economic, and social policies with the correct ideological content. By the late 1980s, however, the party watched as CPSU leader Mikhail Gorbachev attempted to withdraw the CPSU from day-to-day economic affairs.

After the CPB was banned in the wake of the August 1991 coup d'état, Belarusian communists regrouped and renamed themselves the Party of Communists of Belarus (PCB), which became the umbrella organization for Belarus's communist parties and pro-Russian groups. The PCB was formally registered in December 1991. The Supreme Soviet lifted the ban on the CPB in February 1993.

The most active and visible of the opposition political groups in Belarus in the first half of the 1990s was the Belarusian Popular Front (BPF), founded in October 1989 with Zianon Pazniak as chairman. The BPF declared itself a movement open to any individual or party, including communists, provided that those who joined shared its basic goal of a fully independent and democratic Belarus. The BPF's critics, however, claimed that it was indeed a party, pointing out the movement's goal of seeking political power, having a "shadow cabinet," and being engaged in parliamentary politics.

The United Democratic Party of Belarus was founded in November 1990 and was the first political party in independent Belarus other than the communist party. Its membership is composed of technical intelligentsia, professionals, workers, and peasants. It seeks an independent Belarus, democracy, freedom of ethnic expression, and a market economy.

The Belarusian Social Democratic Assembly (Hramada) emerged in March 1991. Its members include workers, peasants, students, military personnel, and urban and rural intelligentsia. Its program advocates an independent Belarus, which does not rule out membership in the CIS, and a market economy with state regulation of certain sectors. The assembly cooperates with other parties and considers itself part of the worldwide social democratic movement.

The Belarusian Peasant Party, founded in February 1991, is headquartered in Minsk and has branches in most oblasts. The party's goals include privatization of land, a free market, a democratic government, and support of Belarusian culture and humanism.

The Belarusian Christian Democratic Union, founded in June 1991, was a continuation of the Belarusian Christian-Democratic Party, which was disbanded by the Polish authorities in western Belarus in the 1930s. Its membership consists mainly of the intelligentsia, and it espouses Christian values, nonviolence, pluralism, private property, and peaceful relations among ethnic groups.

The "Belaya Rus'" Slavic Council was founded in June 1992 as a conservative Russophile group that defends Russian interests in all spheres of social life, vociferously objects to the status of Belarusian as the republic's sole official language, and demands equal status for the Russian language.

In 1995 other parties included the Belarusian Ecological Party, the National Democratic Party of Belarus, the Party of People's Accord, the All-Belarusian Party of Popular Unity and Accord, the Belarusian United Agrarian Democratic Party, the Belarusian Scientific Industrial Congress, the Belarusian Green Party, the Belarusian Humanitarian Party, the Belarusian Party of Labor, the Belarusian Party of Labor and Justice, the Belarusian Socialist Party, the Liberal Democratic Party of Belarus, the Polish Democratic Union, and the Republican Party.

== Lukashenko's administration ==
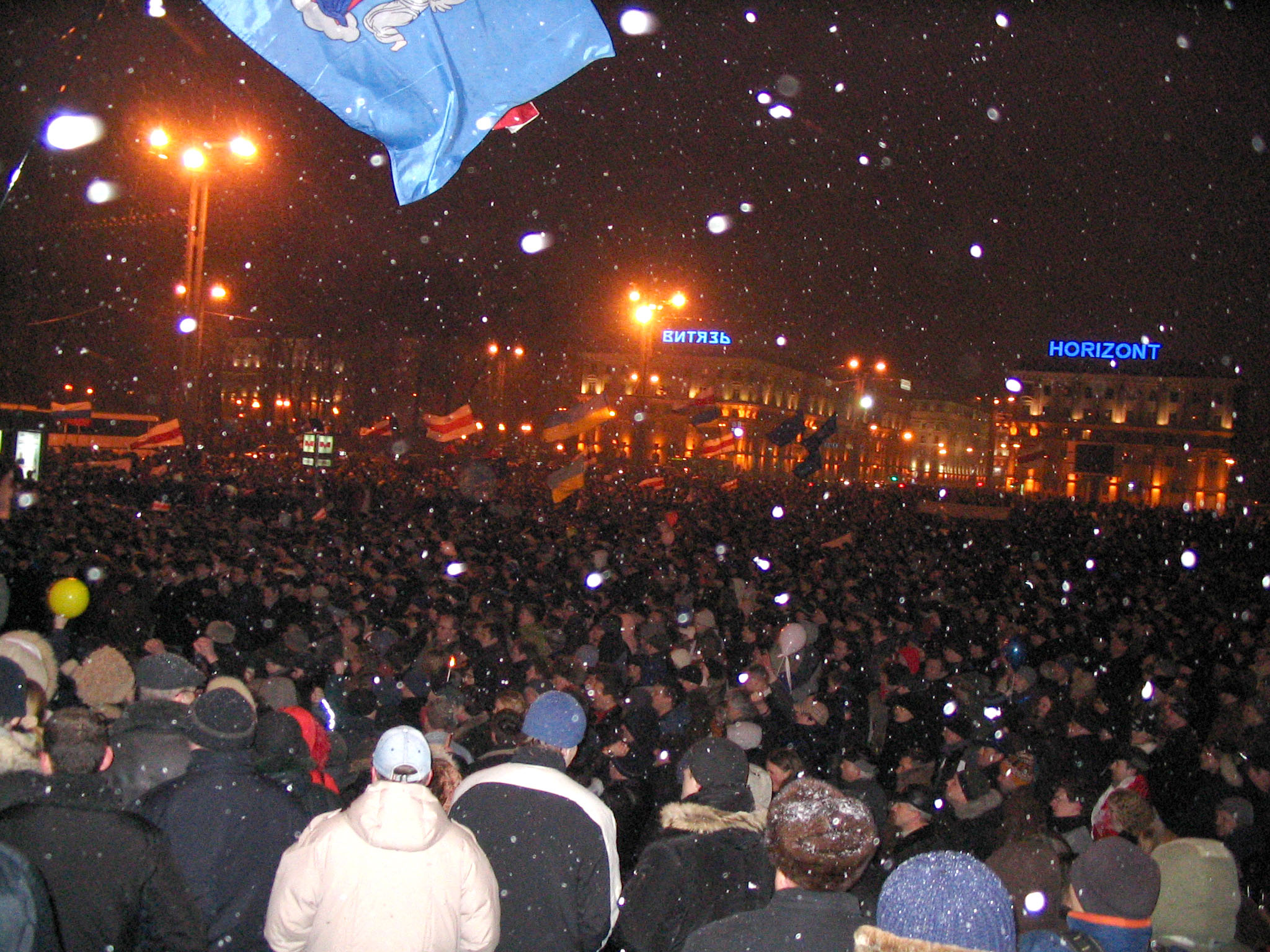
A demonstration by the opposition after the 2006 presidential election

Alexander Lukashenko has been the president since 1994. Lukashenko has been quoted as saying that he has an "authoritarian ruling style" that he uses to run the country. The Council of Europe has barred Belarus from membership since 1997 for numerous voting irregularities in the November 1996 constitutional referendum and parliament by-elections. According to the Venice Commission of the Council of Europe, Belarus's constitution is "illegal and does not respect minimum democratic standards and thus violates the principles of separation of powers and the rule of law". The Belarusian government has also been criticized by Human Rights Watch for human rights violations and its actions against NGOs, independent journalists, national minorities and opposition politicians.

In testimony to the U.S. Senate Committee on Foreign Relations, Secretary of State Condoleezza Rice labeled Belarus, among six other states, as part of the US's list of outposts of tyranny. The Belarusian Foreign Ministry announced that the statement from Secretary Rice "are a poor basis" to form a good Belarusian-American alliance.

The EU sanctioned 21 more Belarusian officials in early 2012. After Belarus expelled the EU and Polish ambassadors in response, EU nations jointly withdrew their ambassadors from Belarus, citing tremendous concern over the political oppression in the nation. It is no secret that "Poland has taken the strongest lead against the ongoing repression in Belarus, hosting broadcasting stations for opposition forces" like Belsat, and "giving asylum to a number of exiled figures."

During the rule of Lukashenko there have been several cases of persecution, including the disappearance or death of prominent opposition leaders Yury Zacharanka and Viktar Hanchar and independent journalists Dzmitry Zavadski and Veronika Cherkasova.

As of 2017, Belarus is also the only nation in Europe that retains the death penalty for certain crimes. The most recent execution was in 2019.

According to a 2025 iSANS online survey top long-term issues included youth emigration, immigration and restrictions on rights and freedoms.

== Speech, assembly, media, and opposition ==
Government restrictions on freedom of speech and the press, peaceful assembly, religions, and movement all increased in 2001. Despite the constitutional provisions, a 1998 government decree limited citizens' right to express their own opinion. Although independent media remains widely available in Minsk, as part of a continuing crackdown on opposition activity, the authorities stepped up their campaign of harassment against the independent media. The authorities continued to severely restrict the right to a free press through near-monopolies on the means of production of newsprint; means of distribution on national level broadcast media, such as television and radio, and by denying accreditation of journalists critical of the government.

Freedom of assembly is restricted under former Soviet law, which is still valid. It requires an application at least 15 days in advance of the event. The local government must respond positively or negatively at least 5 days prior to the event. Public demonstrations occurred frequently in 2001, but always under government oversight.

The constitution provides for freedom of religion; however, the authorities restrict this right in practice. Although Article 16 of the 1996 amended constitution, see the above referendum, reaffirms the equality of religions and denominations before the law, it also contains restrictive language that stipulated that cooperation between the state and religious organizations "is regulated with regard for their influence on the formation of spiritual, cultural, and country traditions of the Belarusian people."

The authorities issue internal passports to all adults, which serve as primary identity documents and are required to travel, obtain permanent housing, and for hotel registration.

The constitution provides for the right of workers—except state security and military personnel—to voluntarily form and join independent unions and to carry out actions in defense of workers' rights, including the right to strike. In practice, however, these rights are limited. The Belarusian Free Trade Union (BFTU) was established in 1991 and registered in 1992. Following the 1995 Minsk metro workers strike, the President suspended its activities. In 1996 BFTU leaders formed a new umbrella organization, the Belarusian Congress of Democratic Trade Union (BCDTU), which encompasses four leading independent trade unions and is reported to have about 15,000 members.

In May 2001, a complaint was lodged with the ILO by several trade union organizations. A trade union campaign was carried out to raise international awareness and put pressure on the Belarus government. On July 27, 2001, they continued to "create problems for him on the international stage." On several occasions, warnings were given to trade unions considered too political and not sufficiently constructive. Twice, on July 27 and September 27, the bank accounts of the FTUB were frozen by the authorities. FTUB leaders were threatened with prosecution. Investigations were carried out, but with no result. The accounts were then reopened.

In 2005, the Lukashenko government launched a campaign against the Union of Poles in Belarus (UPB) which represents the Polish minority in Belarus and was the largest civil organization uncontrolled by the government at that time. The Belarusian authorities claimed that their pro-western Polish neighbors were trying to destabilize the government of Belarus. In May and in summer, they closed a Polish-language newspaper, replaced the democratically elected leadership of the UPB with their own nominees and launched a media campaign against Poland; both parties expelled each other's diplomats.

In 2013, Amnesty International characterized Belarusian legislation on registration of NGOs as "over-prescriptive".

Belarusian Ministry of justice has denied all attempts to register new political parties since 2000. Belarusian Christian Democracy made 7 attempts to register, Party of freedom and progress — 4 attempts; People's Hramada party was also prevented from registration. The ministry justified all refusals by the reasons that are thought to be artificial and flimsy. For example, the ministry refused to register a local branch of BPF Party in Hrodna Region because of "incorrect line spacing" in the documents. During another attempt to register this branch, the ministry requested the additional documents that are not mentioned in the law.

One of the refusals got by the Belarusian Christian Democracy cited the lack of home or work phones information for some of the party founders as the reason. Another refusal was based on a statement in the BCD's charter that its members should be "supporters of a Christian worldview". In 2009, the ministry declared that the registration process was simplified, but the legal experts of political parties doubted this statement claiming that only insignificant issues were affected.

Amnesty International reported cases of pressure to withdraw signatures needed to register a political party by the local authorities and managers (in state organizations).

Given the difficulties of registering as a political party, and the risks of prosecution for acting in the name of an unregistered party, political parties seek registration as associations or institutions, but even so many experience difficulty in registering.

— Amnesty International

== Administrative divisions ==
Belarus is divided into six oblasts (voblasts or regions). The city of Minsk has a special status as the capital of Belarus. Minsk is also the capital of Minsk Region.

The regions are divided into raions (districts).

== Foreign relations ==
Russia remains the largest and most important partner for Belarus both in the political and economic fields, with almost half of Belarusian exports going to Russia. Due to the structure of Belarusian industry, Belarus relies heavily on Russia both for export markets and for the supply of raw materials and components.

After Alexander Lukashenko became Belarusian leader in 1994, the relationship between Minsk and the EU deteriorated and has remained cold and distant. The EU has condemned the government of Belarus several times for authoritarian and anti-democratic practices, and has imposed sanctions on Belarus.

== See also ==
- Union of Russia and Belarus
- A Day of Solidarity with Belarus
- Right Alliance, a youth non-governmental organization in Belarus
- Lukashenko family

== Journal articles ==
- Korosteleva, Elena A.; Petrova, I. (August 2021). "Community Resilience in Belarus and the EU response". Journal of Common Market Studies. 59 (1): 124–136. doi:10.1111/jcms.13248. S2CID 244251848.
- Korosteleva, E. A. & Petrova, I., “Community Resilience in Belarus and the EU response”, Journal of Common Market Studies, Vol.59(1), August 2021, pp. 124–136
- Petrova, I & Korosteleva, E. A.,“Societal fragilities and resilience: The emergence of peoplehood in Belarus”, Journal of Eurasian Studies, Vol.12(2), August 2021, pp. 122–132
- Korosteleva, E. A.,“The EU and Belarus: seizing the opportunity?”, European Policy Analysis, Vol.2016(3), November 2016, pp. 1–12
- Korosteleva, E. A.,“The Limits of the EU Governance: Belarus ' Response to the European Neighbourhood Policy”, Contemporary Politics, Vol.15(2), June 2009, pp. 229–45
- Korosteleva, E. A. & Bosse, G.,“Changing Belarus ? The Limits of EU Governance in Eastern Europe”, Cooperation and Conflict, Vol.44, No.2 2009, pp. 143–65
- Korosteleva, E. A.,“Was it a Quiet Revolution? Belarus After the 2006 Presidential Election”, Journal of Communist Studies and Transition Politics, special issue, Vol.25, Nos.2& 3, June–September 2009, pp. 324–46
- Eke, Steven M.; Taras Kuzio (May 2000). "Sultanism in Eastern Europe: The Socio-Political Roots of Authoritarian Populism in Belarus". Europe-Asia Studies. 52 (3): 523–547. doi:10.1080/713663061. S2CID 153583106.

== Books ==
- Карасцялёва, Алена; Пятрова, Ірына; Кудленка, Настасся (2024). Беларусь у XXI стагоддзі: паміж дыктатурай і дэмакратыяй. Skaryna Press. ISBN 978-1-9156-0139-1.
- Korosteleva, Elena; Petrova, Irina; Kudlenko, Anastasiia (2023). Belarus in the Twenty-First Century: Between Dictatorship and Democracy. Routledge. doi:10.4324/9781003311454. ISBN 9781032318059.
- Korosteleva, Elena; Lawson, Colin; Marsh, Rosalind (2003). Contemporary Belarus Between Democracy and Dictatorship. Routledge. doi:10.4324/9780203220399. ISBN 9780203220399.
- White, Stephen; Korosteleva, Elena; Löwenhardt, John (2005). Post-Communist Belarus. Rowman and Littlefield. ISBN 9780742535558.
- Wilson, A. (2011) Belarus: The Last Dictatorship in Europe, London: Yale University Press
- Korosteleva, E. A., (2008), Belarus : political party system, in Sagar, D (ed.), "Political Parties of the World", (London:Harper Publishers), 7th edition
- Parker, S., (2007), "The Last Soviet Republic: Alexander Lukashenko's Belarus",. Trafford Books
- Kulik, A. and Pshizova, S., (eds.) (2005), "Political Parties in Post-Soviet Space: Russia, Belarus, Ukraine, Moldova and the Baltics", London : Praeger Publishers
- Lewis, A. (ed.)(2002) The EU and Belarus: Between Moscow and Brussels, London : Kogan Page
