= Jeans Revolution =

2006 pro-democracy protests in Belarus

2006 Belarusian protests
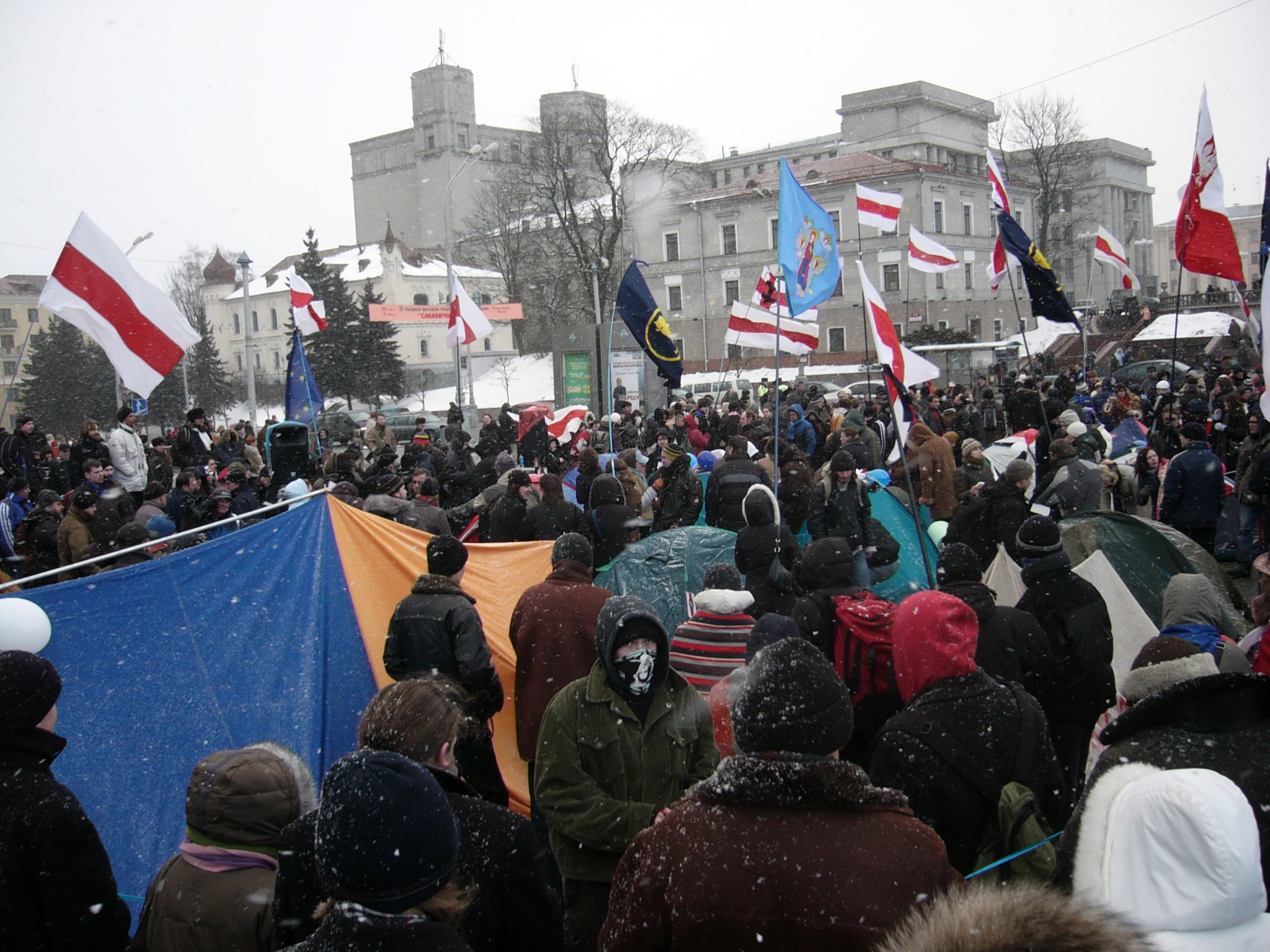
- Opposition demonstration following the presidential election on October Square, Minsk, 21 March 2006
- Date: 19–25 March 2006
- Location: Belarus
- Caused by: Alleged electoral fraud during the 2006 Belarusian presidential election
- Goals: Resignation of President Alexander Lukashenko; Fresh elections
- Methods: Demonstrations
- Result: Protests suppressed by force

Parties
(Belarus) Belarusian opposition: United Democratic Forces of Belarus; Young Front; Belarusian Social Democratic Party (Assembly); Zubr	Government of Belarus: Internal Troops; Militsiya; KGB

Lead figures
(Belarus) Alaksandar Milinkievič (Belarus) Alyaksandr Kazulin (Belarus) Uładzimir Arłou (Belarus) Anatoly Lebedko	Alexander Lukashenko (Belarus) Sergei Sidorsky (Belarus) Uladzimir Navumau (Belarus) Stepan Sukhorenko

Number
45 000 demonstrators	

Casualties
- Arrested: over 500

The Jeans Revolution (Belarusian: Джынсавая рэвалюцыя, transliteration: Džynsavaja revalucyja, Russian: Джинсовая революция, romanized: Dzhinsovaya revolyutsiya) was a term used by Belarus' democratic opposition to describe its protests following the 2006 Belarusian presidential election.

== Etymology ==
The Jeans Revolution was also referred to as the Cornflower Revolution (васильковая революция, in Russian media) and the Denim Revolution, in reference to the color blue as a parallel to the other color revolutions; however, unlike them, the Jeans Revolution did not bring radical changes to Belarusian politics and society.

== History ==
The term "Jeans Revolution" originated after a 16 September 2005 public demonstration against the policies of Alexander Lukashenko. On 16 September 1999 popular Belarusian opposition leader Viktor Gonchar had disappeared; the Council of Europe suspects that the present head of the Belarusian SOBR, Dmitri Pavlichenko, had links with Gonchar's disappearance. The Belarusian police seized the white-red-white flags used by the opposition (and banned in the state), and an activist of the youth movement Zubr, Mikita Sasim (Belarusian: Мiкiта Сасiм, Russian: Никита Сасим), raised his denim shirt (commonly called a "jeans shirt" in Russian), announcing this would be their flag instead. In the former Soviet Union, jeans often symbolized Western culture. The Belarusian opposition recognized denim as a symbol of protest against Lukashenko's "Soviet-like" policies, carrying also the message that Belarusians are "not isolated [from the West]" Subsequently, Zubr suggested wearing jeans on the 16th day of each month, in remembrance of alleged disappearances in Belarus.

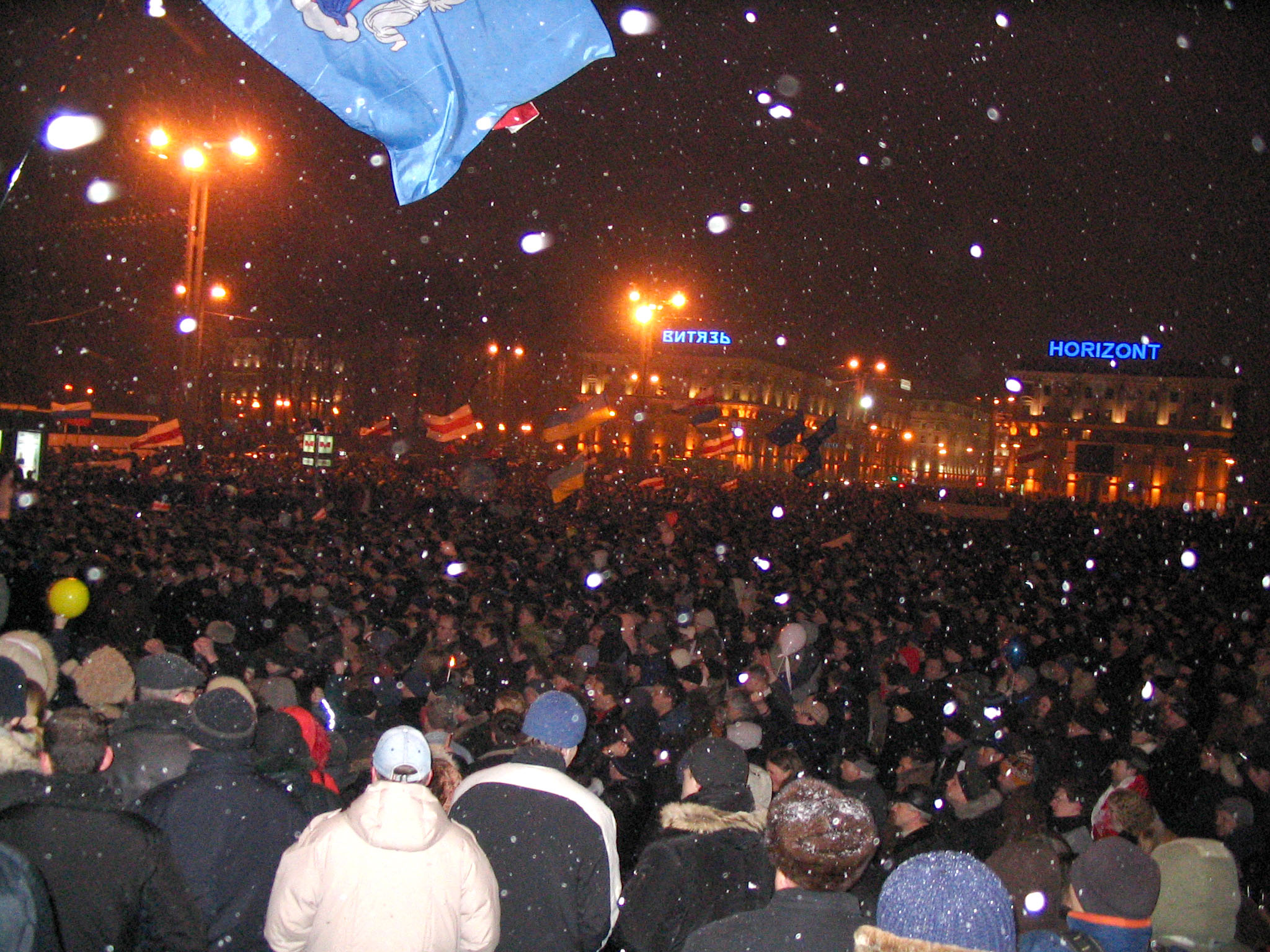
Protest at October Square in Minsk, 19 March 2006

The term "Jeans Revolution" came to prominence after the demonstrations held in Minsk, the capital of Belarus, disputing the 2006 elections. The protest against the outcome of the 19 March election began as soon as polls closed late Sunday, with more than 10,000 people gathering in the square. Each evening saw a smaller and smaller gathering—5,000 on Monday, 3,000 to 4,000 on Tuesday. As of 23 March, only about 200 mostly youthful protesters remained concentrated around the opposition's tent camp erected on October Square in Minsk.

On 24 March authorities sent in riot police to clear out the makeshift tent-camp in October Square and ordered the protesters to disperse. State television carried a report from city police stating that no one was hurt in the operation. Some observers remarked on the relatively gentle treatment of demonstrators and suggested that the Belarusian president may have attempted to react more sensibly given Western opinion.

The white-red-white flag used during the independence from Russia from 1918 to 1919 and from the Soviet Union in 1991 to 1995, used by the protestors

President Alexander Lukashenko earlier announced that protests similar to what occurred during the Orange, Rose, and Tulip Revolutions would not take place in Belarus, stating that "force will not be [allowed to be] used" to claim the presidency. Belarus authorities vowed to crush unrest in the event of large-scale protests following the election.

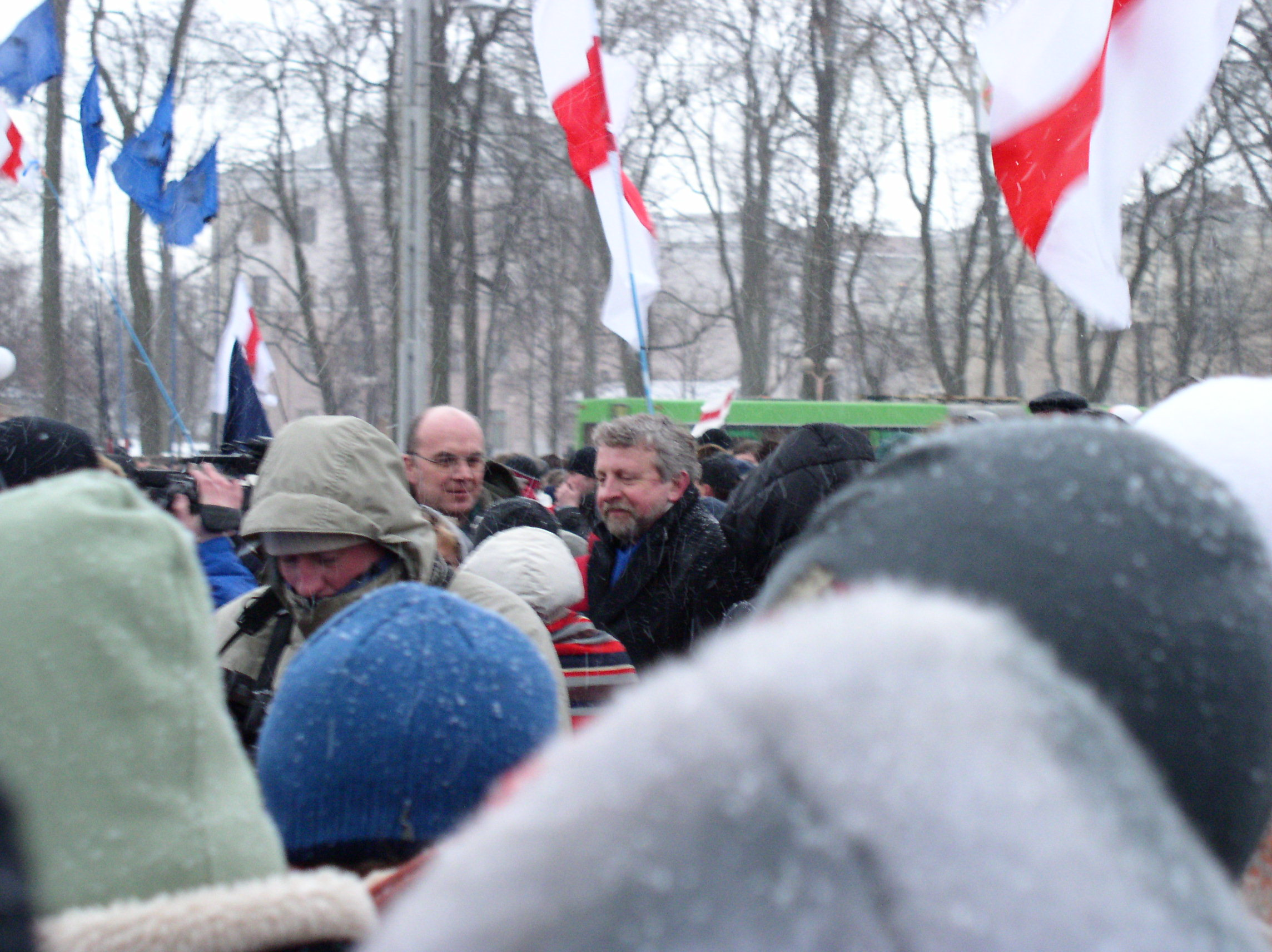
Milinkevich during a protest on 21 March

On 20 March, Alaksandar Milinkievič told 7,000 supporters (fewer than in Sunday's gathering) that they faced a long haul with their protests: "We, free people of Belarus, will never recognise the election. They are afraid of us. Their power is based on lies". However, Lukashenko renewed charges that his rivals had planned pro-Western revolts like those in the ex-Soviet republics of Ukraine and Georgia. "Let me say that the revolution that so many people talked about and some were preparing, has failed and it could not be otherwise", he stated during the news conference on his victory.

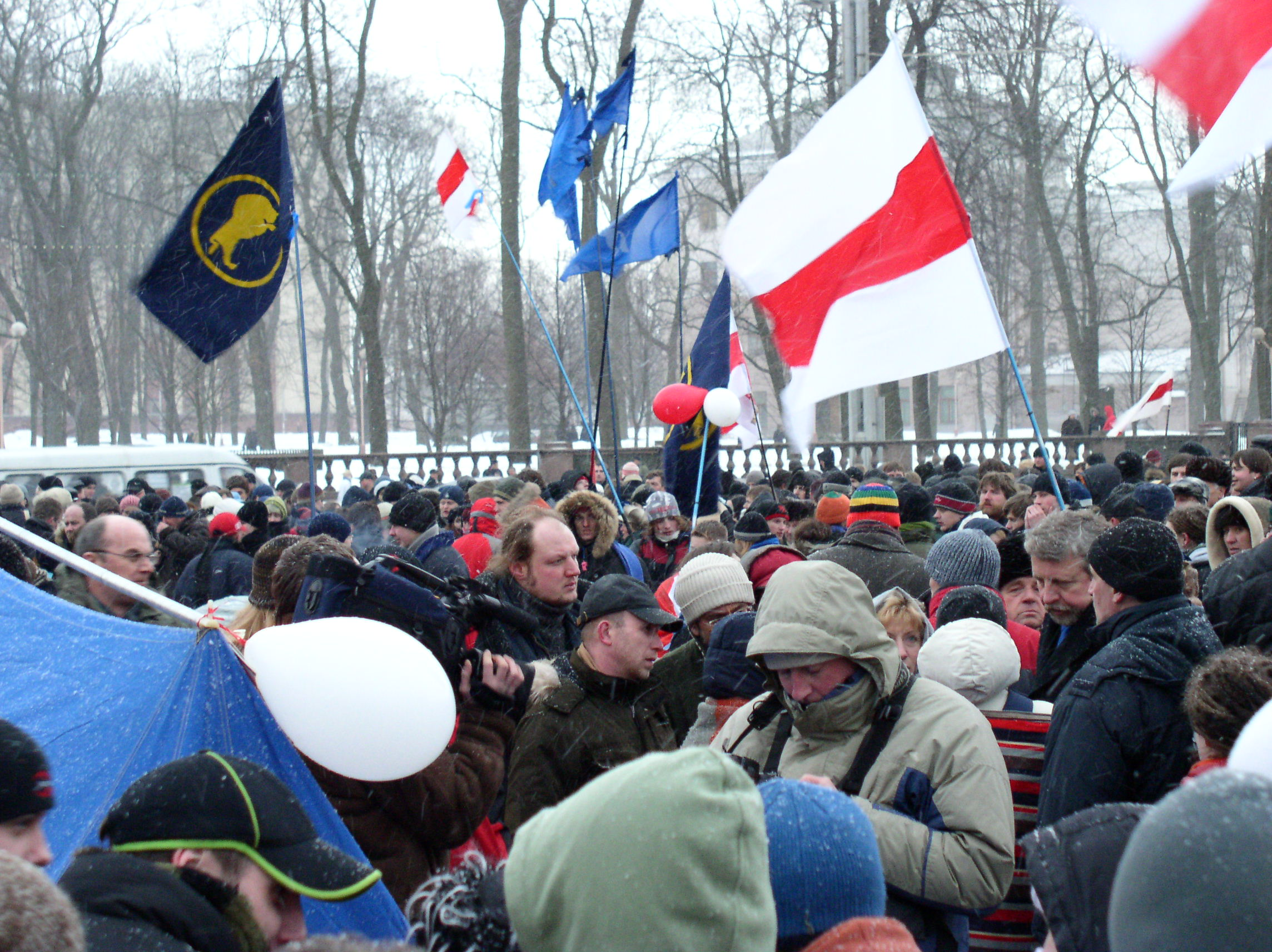
Belarusian opposition and Zubr protesters, 21 March

On 25 March, approximately 45,000 protesters in Belarus confronted police forces. The police did not clash with the demonstrators, waiting for riot squads to arrive. Later on, there were clashes between protesters and the riot police and the protesters were eventually driven back. More than 100 people were arrested along with Alexander Kozulin, a supporter of the protests and a candidate against Lukashenko. The police allegedly assaulted Kozulin during his arrest. On 14 July 2006, Kozulin was sentenced to five-and-a-half years imprisonment for his actions in the protests.

Also on 25 March, Milinkievič stated that he hoped for a month-long pause in protests, apparently hoping that he could build up opposition and calm angst.

The Belarusian filmmaker Yury Khashchavatski documented the opposition movement, especially the post-election protests, in his film Kalinoŭski Square.

A Lesson of Belarusian, a documentary directed by Miroslaw Dembinski from the former Soviet republic of Belarus, related the events preceding and leading up to the "Jeans revolution." The regime labelled the documentary as containing "extreme material, unworthy and forbidden to watch in the country."

== See also ==
- Belarus Free Theatre
- "A Day of Solidarity with Belarus"
- Under the Radar Festival
- A Lesson of Belarusian
