= Anatol Krasouski =

Belarusian businessman, politician and pro-democracy activist (1952–1999)

- Born: Anatol Sciapanavič Krasouski; 12 May 1952; Krupki, Minsk Region, Byelorussian SSR, Soviet Union
- Disappeared: 16 September 1999 (aged 47); Minsk, Belarus
- Status: Missing for 27 years, 1 month and 14 days

Anatol Sciapanavič Krasouski (Belarusian: Анатоль Сцяпанавіч Красоўскі, Russian: Анатолий Степанович Красовский, 12 May 1952 – disappeared 16 September 1999) was a Belarusian businessman, teacher, and opposition politician. Alongside his friend Viktar Hanchar, he disappeared and was presumably murdered in 1999.

== Career ==
Krasouski was the publisher of several newspapers. Alongside Hanchar, he publicly criticized Alexander Lukashenko for falsifying the results of the 1996 referendum, which expanded the president's powers.

== Disappearance ==
Krasouski disappeared in Minsk on 16 September 1999, along Hanchar. Pieces of broken glass and blood were found on the supposed site where Hanchar and Krasouski had been last seen. On 5 December 2002, they were officially declared missing by the court. In January 2003, the Chief Prosecutor of Minsk suspended the criminal investigation into the disappearance of Hanchar and Krasouski.

According to the former head of jail number 1 Oleg Alkaev (Aleh Alkaeu), Hanchar and Krasouski were abducted and executed on the order of people close to President Lukashenko. Investigation of the disappearance of Hanchar and Krasouski is one of the main issues of the Belarusian opposition, and is also mentioned in the documents of international organizations.

In September 2004, the European Union and the United States issued travel bans for four Belarusian officials suspected of being involved in the kidnapping of Hanchar: Interior Affairs Minister Vladimir V. Naumov, Prosecutor General Viktor Sheiman, Minister for Sports and Tourism Yuri Sivakov, and Colonel Dmitri Pavlichenko from the Belarus Interior Ministry.

For several years the Belarusian opposition has organized the Day of Solidarity with Belarus on the 16th of every month to commemorate the disappearance of Hanchar, Krasouski, Jury Zacharanka, Dzmitry Zavadski, and the mysterious death of Hienadz Karpienka.

In December 2019, Deutsche Welle published a documentary film in which Yury Harauski, a former member of the Special Rapid Response Unit, confirmed that it was his unit that had arrested, taken away and murdered pro-democracy activist Yury Zakharanka, and that they later did the same with Viktar Hanchar and Anatol Krasouski. Harauski fled to Switzerland in 2018, seeking asylum. In 2023 Harauski was arrested and charged with the forced disappearance of Zacharanka, Hanchar and Krasouski. Harauski's trial in a Swiss court opened on 19 September 2023.

In 2026 a Swiss court convicted former Belarusian security officer Yuri Harauski over the 1999 abduction and gave him a two-year suspended sentence. He was acquitted over Yury Zacharanka's enforced disappearance.

== See also ==
- List of people who disappeared mysteriously (2000–present)
