= Mikhail Chyhir =

2nd Prime Minister of Belarus 1994–1996

- Міхаіл Чыгір; Михаил Чигирь

2nd Prime Minister of Belarus
- In office 21 July 1994 – 18 November 1996
- President: Alexander Lukashenko
- Preceded by: Vyacheslav Kebich
- Succeeded by: Sergei Ling

Personal details
- Born: 24 May 1948 (age 78) Usovo, Belarusian SSR, USSR

Mikhail Nikolayevich Chyhir or Michaił Mikalajevič Čyhir (Note: Belarusian: Міхаіл Мікалаевіч Чыгір, romanized: Michaił Mikalajevič Čyhir; Russian: Михаил Николаевич Чигирь, romanized: translit, lit. 'Mihail Nikolajevič Čigir') (born 24 May 1948) is a Belarusian politician who served as the second Prime Minister of Belarus from 21 July 1994 to 18 November 1996.

== Early life ==
Chyhir was born in Usovo (Belarusian: Vusava) on 24 May 1948.

== Career ==
Chyhir was appointed as Prime Minister in July 1994, on the day following the inauguration of Alexander Lukashenko as president. Prior to this, he served as head of Belagroprombank, a bank specializing in agricultural pursuits.

=== Resignation ===
In 1996, Chyhir resigned as prime minister in protest of Lukashenko's efforts to gain unlimited authority over the country. The following year he became a signatory of Charter 97. In 1999, he announced he would run for President of Belarus in order to unseat Lukashenko.

== Arrest ==
On 30 March 1999, Chyhir was arrested by the Belarusian government. It was alleged that he embezzled large sums of money involving loans while in charge of Belagroprombank. Chyhir argued that the loans were not due to be repaid until after he was no longer with the bank, thus the money did not involve him. Prior to Chyhir's arrest, several other officials who had been attempting to organize a campaign against Lukashenko were continuously repressed by the government, including Viktar Hanchar, who was arrested and later disappeared and eventually presumed murdered, allegedly under the order of someone close to the President. Chyhir's arrest received negative reactions from governments around the world and his release was demanded by the US State Department, the European Union and the Organization for Security and Co-operation in Europe. Additionally, Amnesty International demanded his release and deemed him a prisoner of conscience. The International League for Human Rights also protested his arrest. Chyhir ultimately avoided jail time, receiving a three-year suspended sentence with a two-year probationary period. Following the trial, he stated his intention to run for election to the House of Representatives of Belarus.

== See also ==
- Politics of Belarus
