= 3rd Separate Special-Purpose Brigade =

Minsk, Belarus Brigade: Special Forces

- Belarusian: 3-я асобная Чырвонасцяжная брыгада спецыяльнага прызначэння Russian: 3-я отдельная Краснознаменная бригада специального назначения
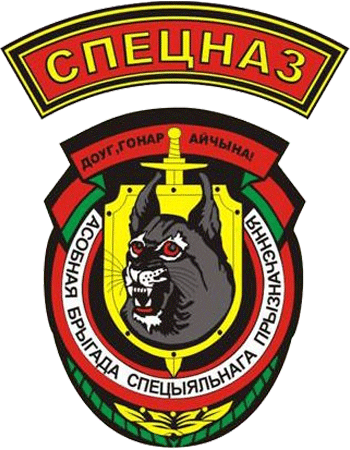
- Shoulder patch of the unit
- Active: 1993 (current form)
- Country: USSR (1942-1991); Belarus (1991-present)
- Branch: Internal Troops of the Soviet Union; Internal Troops of Belarus
- Type: Gendarmerie
- Headquarters: Minsk
- Nickname: MUN 3214

The Minsk-based 3rd Separate Red Banner Special-Purpose Brigade (Belarusian: 3-я асобная Чырвонасцяжная брыгада спецыяльнага прызначэння, romanized: 3-ja asobnaja Čyrvonaściažnaja bryhada śpiecyjaĺnaha pryznačeńnia, Russian: 3-я отдельная Краснознаменная бригада специального назначения), also known as Military Unit 3214 and nicknamed the Uruchenskaya Brigade is a formation of the Internal Troops of Belarus. It is part of the special police (riot police) system in the Ministry of Internal Affairs. It has the specific role of performing crowd control and anti-terrorism tasks.

It is based in the neighborhood of Uruchye in Minsk and is under the command of Vladimir Zhiznevsky, who is under sanctions by the European Union and was recommended to be sanctioned by the United States.

== History ==
Unit 3214 originates from the 287th Rifle Regiment of the NKVD, which was created on 6 March 1942 in the city of Voronezh on the basis of a battalion of the 73rd Regiment of the 3rd NKVD Division of Railroad Building Protection. Although originally created for the protection of railway structures, the regiment took part in battles against the invading German Wehrmacht in Voronezh, performing in combat missions in the North Caucasus as well. In 1975, the brigade was awarded the Order of the Red Banner by decree of the Presidium of the Supreme Soviet of the Soviet Union. The brigade also took part in eliminating the consequences of the Chernobyl accident, as well as settling interethnic conflicts in the Nagorno-Karabakh region.

The modern unit was formed in the 1990s on the basis of the 334th Motor Rifle Regiment of the 120th Guards Motor Rifle Division. A Special Rapid Response Unit was established on 29 June 1999 on the basis of the Unit 3214. On 13 October 2006, by a presidential decree, the 3rd Separate Red Banner Operational Brigade was renamed into the 3rd Separate Red Banner Special Purpose Brigade of the Internal Troops.

On March 16, 2016, SOBR was placed under the brigade's command.

In 2020, a dormitory was built on the territory of the unit, having 116 studios and 26 one-bedroom apartments. It is primarily meant for single servicemen as well as fourth-year cadets of the Internal Troops Faculty of the Military Academy of Belarus.

== Role within the Internal Troops ==
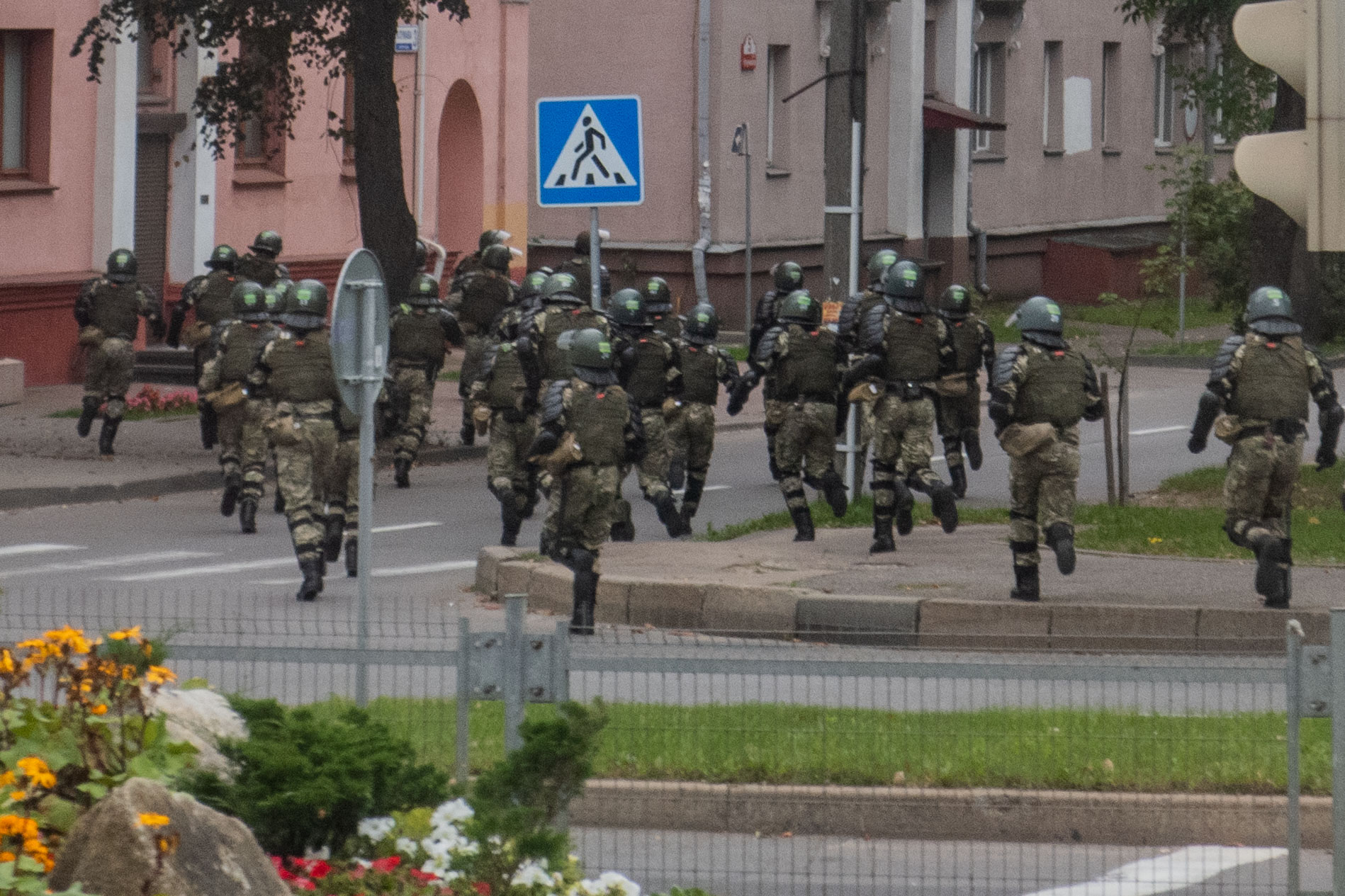
Brigade personnel during the 2020 protests.

The number of personnel in the unit ranges from 1500 to 2000 people. The brigade includes special-purpose battalions, the SOBR and support units. In peacetime, the brigade's personnel participate in maintaining public order and often go on missions outside of Minsk. During opposition rallies in the capital, the brigade is usually kept in reserve and used only in the most extreme cases. Members of the Honor Guard Company of the Minsk Military Commandant are also subordinated to the brigade.

=== 2020 protests ===
The unit became more controversial during the 2020 Belarusian protests, being one of the enforcers of state policy after the Belarusian presidential election along with the OMON and Almaz units. President Alexander Lukashenko visited the unit's headquarters days before the election, watching tactical exercises, during which he called on the unit to maintain its combat readiness. The Russian newspaper Novaya Gazeta wrote that the beatings and arrests that occurred on 10 August 2020, were ordered by the retired commander of Military Unit 3214, Dmitry Pavlichenko, who had been previously arrested for serious crimes.

== Characteristics ==
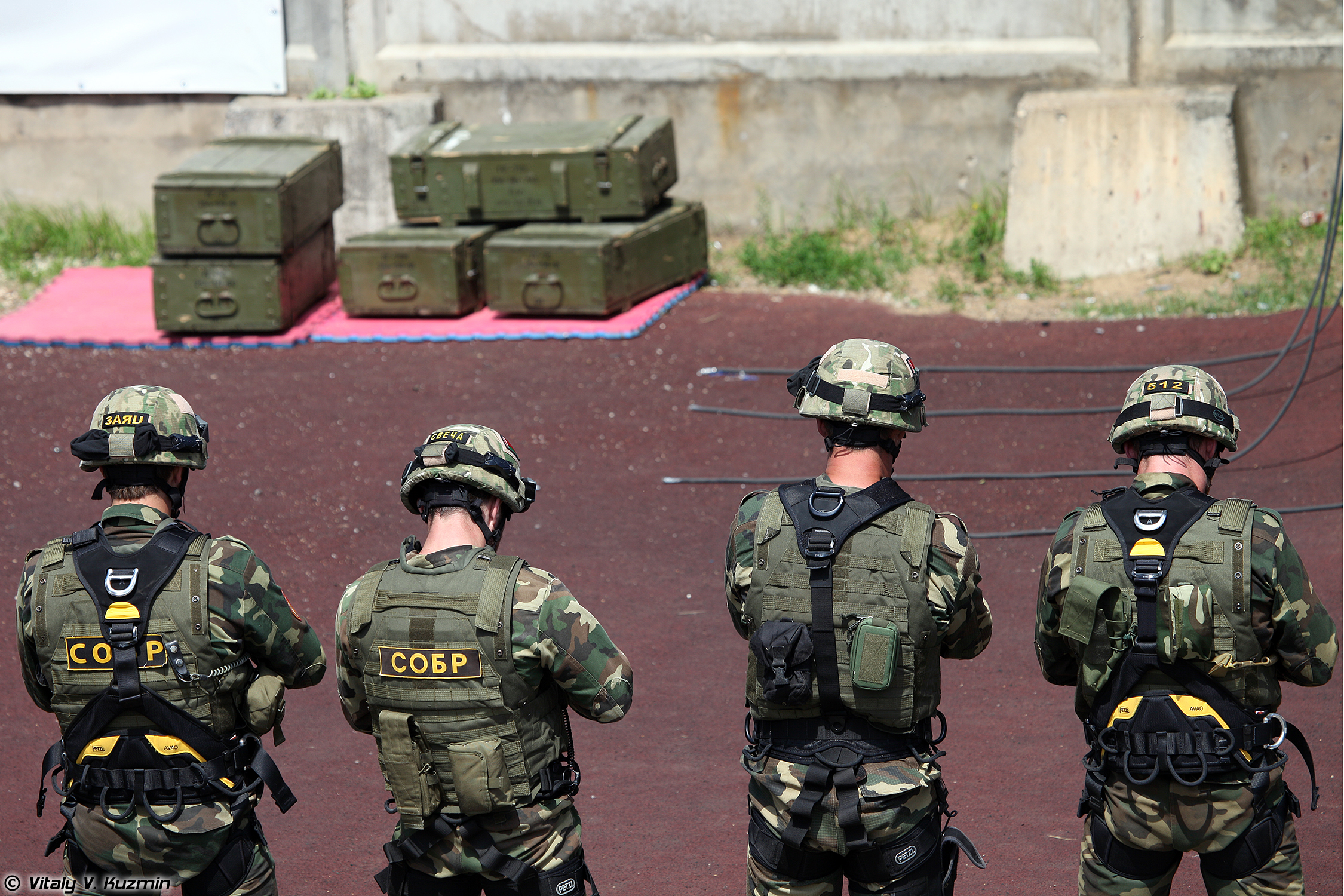
The Special Purpose Unit of Belarus of the Internal Troops.

Today, it is the only unit in Belarus that has the right to wear a maroon beret. The symbol of the brigade is the lynx, a Belarusian predator. Its brigade holiday is on 4 September. A former officer of the brigade described the men in its ranks as "zombies", claiming that they have been brainwashed. According to him, their motto is "I serve the country and the President".

== Unit Patches ==
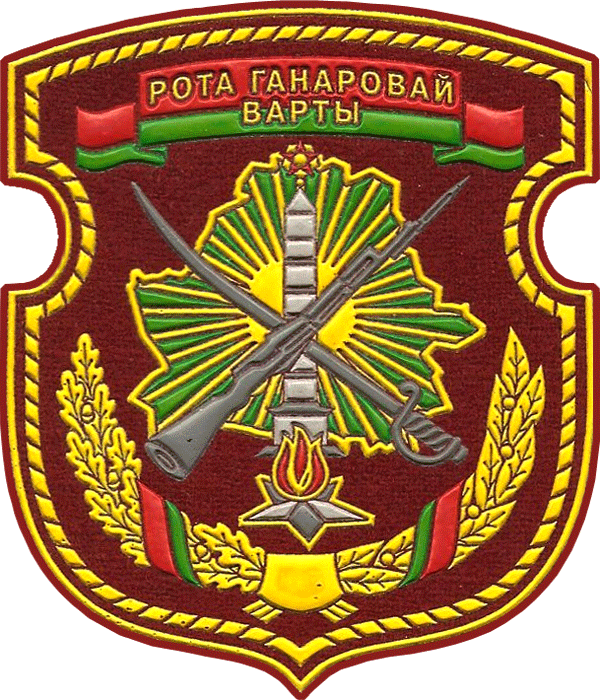
Honor Guard Patch

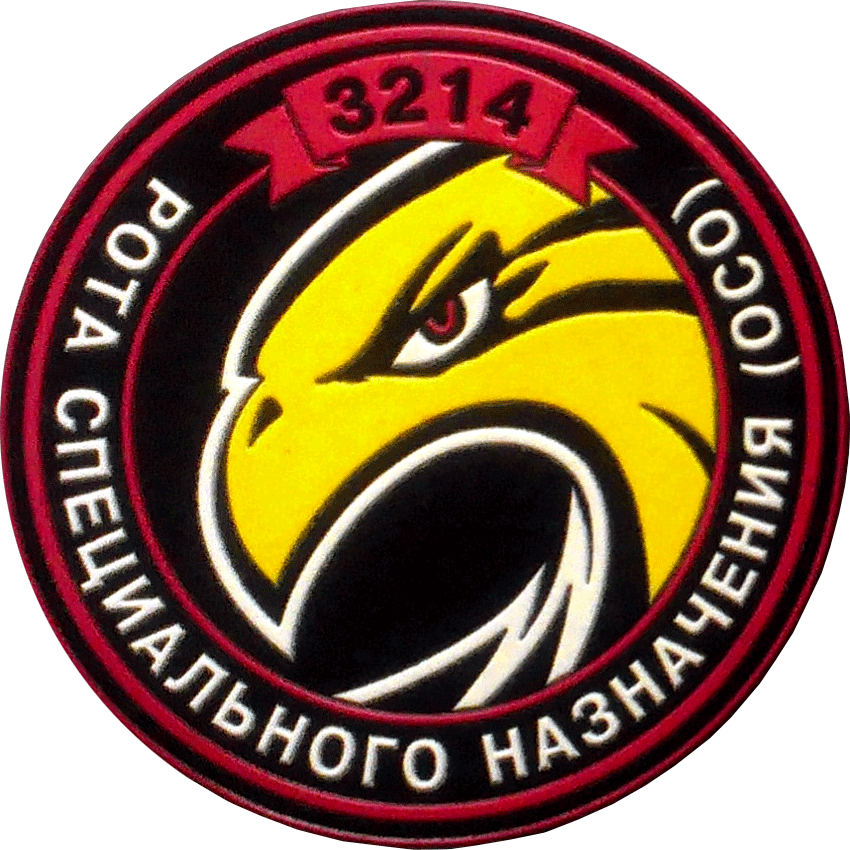
Special Operations Ensuring Company

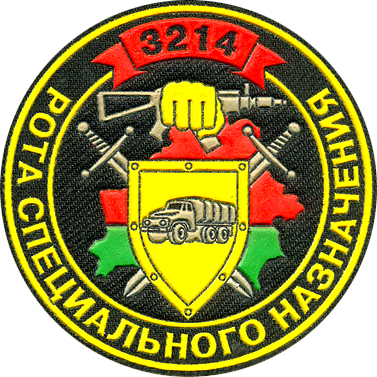
Technical Support Company patch

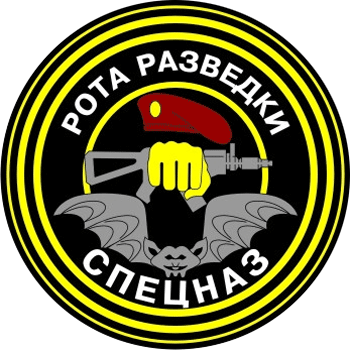
Reconnaissance Company

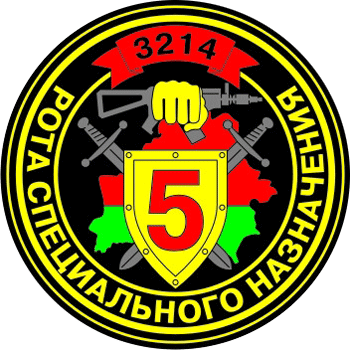
Special Forces Company patch

== See also ==
- Minsk City Police Department
- 45th Guards Spetznaz Brigade
- Berkut (special police force)
- Separate Operational Purpose Division
