= 1999 Belarusian presidential election =

Non-binding presidential election held by the Belarusian opposition

The 1999 Belarusian presidential election was a political protest action by members of Belarusian opposition who did not recognise the 1996 constitutional reform which extended Alexander Lukashenko's presidential term.

== Background ==
The 1996 constitutional amendments created the bicameral National Assembly of Belarus to replace the Supreme Council, which was a stronghold of opposition towards populist president Alexander Lukashenko. Another amendment extended incumbent Alexander Lukashenko's term for another two years and as a result, the next election moved from 1999 to 2001.

On 10 January 1999, a meeting of 43 former deputies of the Supreme Council of Belarus was held. In accordance with 1994 Constitution, they called presidential election on 16 May 1999, as from Council's point of view Lukashenko's term was due to end in July. To organize the election, the Supreme Council appointed an alternative Central Election Commission headed by Viktar Hanchar.

== Campaign ==
On 13 February 1999, the Belarusian Popular Front nominated Zianon Pazniak as its presidential candidate.

On 1 March 1999, former prime minister Mikhail Chigir announced his intention to run as an independent candidate. On 29 March, he stated that 132,038 signatures had been submitted to the election commission in his support. According to Popular Front deputy chairman Lyavon Barshchewski, 114,000 signatures were gathered in support of Pazniak.

On 31 March, Viktar Hanchar presented certificates of presidential candidates to heads of Chigir and Pazniak campaign headquarters, as Mikhail Chigir was arrested 30 March, and Zianon Pazniak has been in political exile since 1996.

== Voting ==
The election was held from 6 to 16 May 1999 without opening polling stations or compiling voter lists, because due to the measures taken by the authorities loyal to Lukashenko, it was not possible to organize classic polling stations. Election commission members visited voters' homes with ballot boxes. It then became clear that such election cannot meet OSCE standards, it will not be possible to invite international observers, and the candidate who receives the most votes will not be recognized internationally as the new president.

On 7 May 1999, one of the opposition leaders, the former minister of internal affairs Yury Zacharanka, went missing.

According to Hanchar's election commission, out of 7.5 million Belarusians eligible to vote, over one million people voted in the first three days. After the voting started, Zianon Pazniak withdrew his candidacy due to "numerous violations by Hanchar during the campaign". Pazniak's decision provoked criticism from some of his party members and subsequently split the Belarusian Popular Front.

== Aftermath ==
At a press conference on 19 May 1999, Hanchar declared election invalid due to "violations committed during the voting". None of the candidates received more than 50% of the vote, with Pazniak closest to win. The exact data on votes cast for each candidate was not announced. 53% of Belarusians allegedly took part in the voting, although due to mass arrests of activists by Lukashenko-controlled police and withdrawal of People's Front representatives from local election commissions, voting process was paralysed. During the campaign, Hanchar's commission was subject to serious criticism. Reports on turnout were questioned both by the regime and the opposition.

On 21 July 1999, deputies of the Supreme Council appointed its last chairman Syamyon Sharetski acting president of Belarus.

== Reaction ==
- When speaking in the Russian State Duma in October 1999, president Alexander Lukashenko commented on the election and subsequent disappearance of Viktar Hanchar: "Some Western structures have launched a noisy campaign: they say, people are disappearing in Belarus without a trace. But for some reason they only talk about three, or two. Note that these were two who have practically gone bankrupt in politics. Today in Minsk no one talks about the fact that they are missing. We showed how much money they stole for the so-called "election after the expiration of president Lukashenko's term" this spring, when they tried to organize election and as many as 15,000 out of 11 million came to vote, taking into account falsified votes. Yet it was 4 million votes announced." Yabloko parliamentary group did not attend the meeting, considering Lukashenko to be "illegitimate president since 20 July 1999."
- (Organization for Security and Co-operation in Europe) Adrian Severin, head of the OSCE Parliamentary Assembly working group on Belarus: "It was not expected that the election of 16 May 1999 would meet OSCE standards. Nevertheless, it constitutes an important step towards the necessary political dialogue between the government and the opposition."

== See also ==
- Enforced disappearances in Belarus
- 2001 Belarusian presidential election

== Sources ==
- Lyakhovich, Andrey (2011). Альтэрнатыўныя прэзыдэнцкія выбары траўня 1999 году: ініцыятары, ход правядзеньня, палітычныя наступствы [Alternative presidential election of May 1999: initiators, conduct, political consequences] (in Belarusian). Białystok, Vilnius: Belarusian Historical Society. ISBN 978-80-86961-16-3.
