= Dzmitry Zavadski =

Belarusian journalist

Dmitry Zavadsky Дмитрий Завадский
- Dmitry Alexandrovich Zavadsky
- Born: 28 August 1972; Minsk, Byelorussian SSR
- Disappeared: 7 July 2000 (aged 27); Minsk National Airport
- Status: Declared legally dead on 3 December 2003
- Citizenship: Belarusian
- Occupations: Journalist, cameraman
- Employer: Channel One (Russia)
- Spouse: Sviatlana Zavadskaya
- Children: Yury Zavadsky

Dmitry Alexandrovich Zavadsky (Russian: Дми́трий Алекса́ндрович Зава́дский) or Dzmitry Aliaksandravich Zavadski (Belarusian: Дзмітрый Аляксандравіч Завадскі; 28 August 1972 – declared dead 3 December 2003) was a Belarusian journalist who disappeared and was presumably murdered in 2000. Zavadsky worked as journalist and cameraman for Russian Public Television Channel One (ORT). From 1994 to 1997, he was the personal cameraman of Belarusian president Alexander Lukashenko.

== 1997 border-crossing incident ==
In 1997, Zavadsky and ORT reporter Pavel Sheremet were arrested and imprisoned after filming a report about security vulnerability on the Belarus–Lithuania border. Zavadsky filmed the report with Sheremet (along with his drivers) crossing illegally from Belarus to Lithuania and back again, to demonstrate the ease with which smugglers could cross the border. They were charged with Article 17 of the Criminal Code (conspiracy to commit a crime) and Article 80 (intentional violation of the state border), which carried a maximum five-year prison sentence.

The arrests resulted in a diplomatic fallout between Russia and Belarus. The Russian authorities criticized Belarus over the arrests and Russian president Boris Yeltsin cancelled Lukashenko's scheduled trip to Moscow in protest. Lukashenko's invitation was revoked after he had already left Belarus; his plane was denied access to enter Russian airspace.

The trial began on 17 December 1997 in Ashmyany, 55 kilometres (34 mi) from the Lithuanian capital of Vilnius. The selection of the location was highly publicized in both Belarus and Russia. Ashmyany, as a border city, required special permission to access, which complicated the situation for journalists wishing to cover the case. Additionally, the courtroom was too small to accommodate all the interested parties, but the request to transfer the trial to a larger location was denied.

Sheremet and Zavadsky were represented by Belarusian public defenders and Russian attorney Viktor Kuznetsov from ORT. Their attorneys argued there was no evidence of any crime, as the only evidence they had crossed the border illegally was a sign Zavadsky filmed reading "Republic of Lithuania" that is technically located in Belarus. The attorneys accused the state of arresting the journalists not for any crime but for the fact that they criticized the border security. Attorney Mikhail Pastukhov urged the court to seek "justice, not violence."

On 28 January 1998, the court found Sheremet and Zavadsky guilty on all charges. Sheremet and Zavadsky were sentenced to 36 months in prison, but their sentences were suspended.

== Disappearance ==
From October 1999 to May 2000, Zavadsky and Sheremet were in Chechnya filming Chechen Diary, a four-part documentary series for ORT.

On 7 July 2000, Zavadsky drove to the Minsk National Airport to meet Sheremet. Witnesses saw Zavadsky in the airport and his car was later found in the parking lot. Zavadsky has not been seen since.

Zavadsky had received threatening phone calls before his disappearance, and his neighbors saw two men trailing him near his apartment building on the day he disappeared. The witnesses helped police artist compile composite drawings of the two men, but the police refused to release them to the public.

According to the Committee to Protect Journalists, its sources in Belarus suspect that Zavadsky was murdered because he had footage showing Belarusian security agents fighting in Chechnya alongside Chechen rebels.

Belarusian officials, including Deputy Minister of Internal Affairs Mikhail Udovikov, suggested that Zavadsky was abducted either by his colleagues at ORT, including Sheremet, or by members of the local opposition, related to his "pro-Russia" coverage of the Chechen war.

On 20 November 2000, independent Belarusian media received an anonymous email from a person who identified himself as an officer of the Belarus State Security Committee working on the Zavadsky investigation:

"The writer claimed that nine suspects had been arrested, seven of whom were either current or former officers of the Presidential Security Service, and that the suspects had confessed to killing Zavadsky and had named the place where his body was buried. According to the e-mail, the investigators had also found a shovel stained with Zavadsky's blood. Additionally, the e-mail claimed that President Lukashenko refused to allow investigators to exhume the body, and that the case was later transferred from the Prosecutor's Office to the Interior Ministry to sabotage the investigation." — report from Committee to Protect Journalists

The following day, Lukashenko blamed Zavadsky's disappearance on Chechen kidnappers. A week later, Lukashenko fired four of his top officials: his security issues adviser, the chairman of the Security Council, the prosecutor general, and the head of the State Security Committee. Lukashenko asserted that the four had been plotting a coup d'état and had abducted Zavadsky to implicate the president.

== Trial ==
On 14 March 2002, Minsk Regional Court convicted four men of five murders, plus the kidnapping of Dmitry Zavadsky. Two of the men, Valery Ignatovich and Maxim Malik, were former members of the elite Belarusian police unit Almaz. Despite the conviction, Zavadsky's body was never recovered and the circumstances of his disappearance and ultimate fate were not explained.

In addition to Zavadsky, Belarusian authorities failed to determine the fates of leading opposition figures Yury Zakharanka and Viktar Hanchar, and businessman Anatol Krasouski, who also disappeared in 1999 and 2000.

Belarus came under international criticism and human rights monitors regarded the behind-closed-doors trial and convictions as flawed. Journalists were banned from observing the proceedings except for the sentencing. In September 2002, the Parliamentary Assembly of the Council of Europe stated that it was “seriously concerned about the lack of progress” and established an investigative sub-committee to probe into the multiple “disappearances.”

== Subsequent investigations and fallout ==
In December 2003, the Parliamentary Assembly of the Council of Europe alleged that top government officials were involved in the disappearances and subsequent cover-ups. In 2004, the assembly filed a resolution calling for Belarus to initiate a proper criminal investigation into the disappearances, and stated that until "significant process" was made in the cases, it would not reconsider its 1997 suspension of Belarus as a guest member of the council.

In September 2004, the European Union and the United States issued travel bans for fоur Belarusian officials suspected in being involved in the kidnapping of Zavadsky: Interior Affairs Minister Vladimir Naumov, Prosecutor General Viktor Sheiman, Minister for Sports and Tourism Yuri Sivakov, and Colonel Dmitry Pavlichenko from the Belarus Interior Ministry. Naumov had been tasked with leading the investigation despite suspicions he was directly involved. Greece denied Sivakov a visa to prevent him from attending the 2004 Olympic Games in Athens.

Belarusian officials have twice re-opened the investigation into Zavadsky's disappearance—in 2003 and 2005—but no further details have been released about his whereabouts.

In 2007, the U.N. Human Rights Council (UNHRC) denied Belarus a seat on after heavy international criticism of the country's poor human rights and press freedom record, including the disappearances of the four men and the 2005 murder of Veronika Cherkasova.

== Legacy ==
In 2004, his wife, Sviatlana Zavadskaya, and Iryna Krasouskaya, the wife of Anatol Krasouski, co-founded the We Remember Foundation, dedicated to bringing justice to the disappeared and exposing human rights violations in Belarus.

== See also ==
- Day of Solidarity with Belarus
- List of people who disappeared mysteriously: post-1970
- List of journalists killed in Europe
