= Enforced disappearances in Belarus =

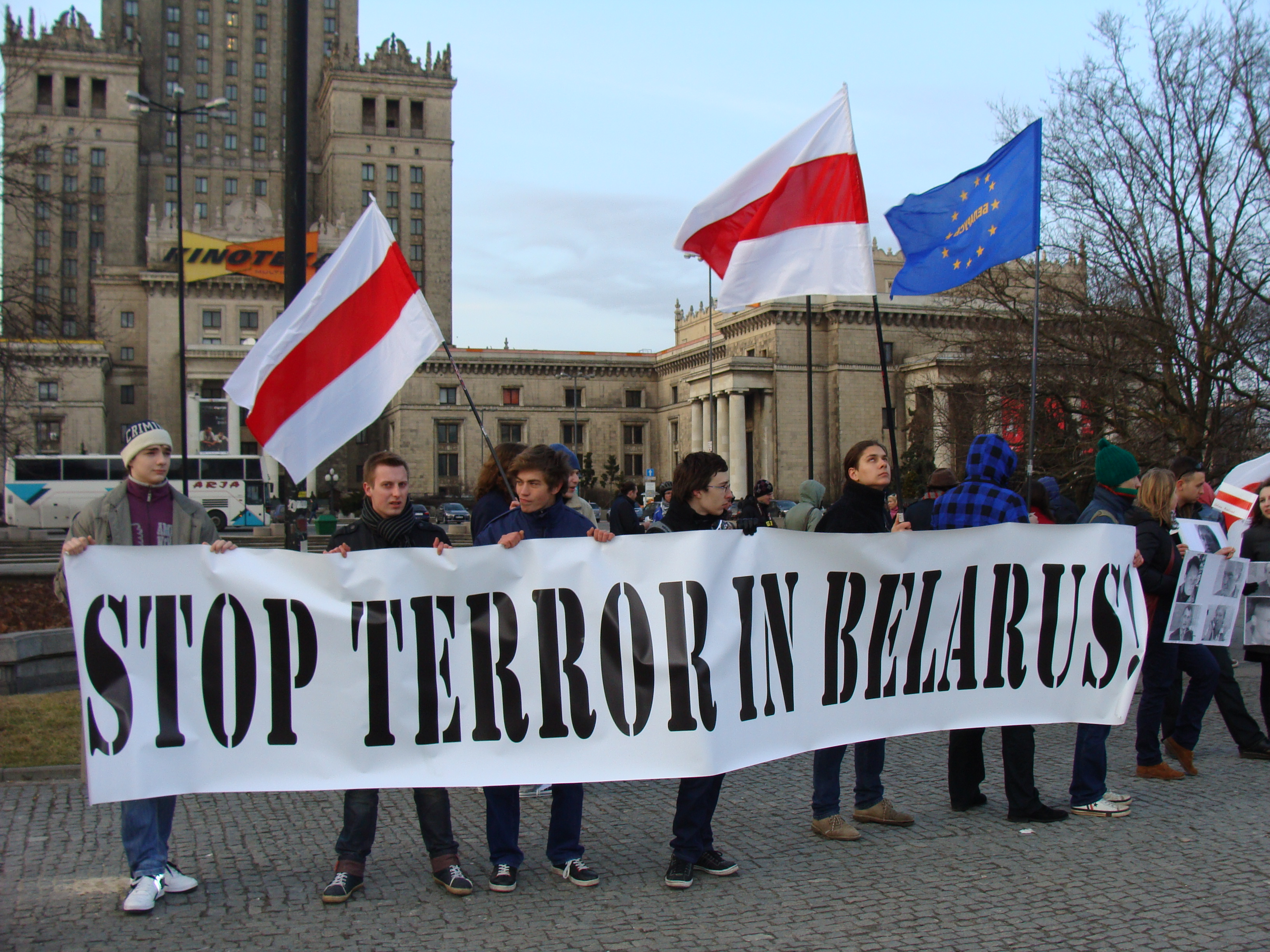
An event in support of rallies in memory of missing politicians in Belarus in Warsaw held on 16 September 2011.

The most infamous cases of people's disappearances in Belarus have occurred during the presidency of Alexander Lukashenko. For the most part, the people who have disappeared have been opponents of the president. They are considered cases of forced disappearance.

== Background ==
Alexander Lukashenko won the first presidential elections in Belarus, in 1994. When, after the election, Lukashenko began to implement a policy completely different from what he had promised, many members of his team joined the opposition. In 1995, Lukashenko pressured the Supreme Council to hold a referendum which, in the opinion of the opposition, was illegal. It sparked rallies against the president which were often dispersed by the riot police. In 1996, the contradictions between the president and the Supreme Council escalated, which ended in the Council's dissolution. It was later replaced by the National Assembly, where only one chamber was elected by the people. In the same year, censorship increased significantly in Belarus.

== Disappearances in 1999 ==
=== Viktar Hanchar and Anatol Krasouski ===
During the 1994 elections, Viktar Hanchar was on Lukashenko's team. However, shortly after President Lukashenko began implementing a policy that was not at all what he had promised, Hanchar joined the opposition. He actively opposed the President during the November 1996 referendum and refused to recognize the results of the 1996 referendum. As a result, he lost the post of Chairman of the Central Election Committee (CEC). He became the head of the alternative CEC during the 1999 alternative presidential elections.

On 16 September 1999, Viktar Hanchar, together with his friend, businessman Anatol Krasouski, disappeared without a trace in Minsk. A while later, at the alleged place of the abduction on Fabrychnaya Street, shards of car glass and the blood of the abductees were found. According to Hanchar's colleague, Vasil Shlyndzikau, the “trigger” for Hanchar's disappearance was the intention to hold an enlarged meeting of the previously dispersed 13th Supreme Council with the participation of independent trade unions and opposition activists in three days on 19 September. At this meeting, they were going to make a decision on the national campaign to remove Lukashenko from power on the basis of collected evidence of the President's violations of the laws of the Republic of Belarus.

=== Yury Zakharanka ===
During the 1994 elections, Yury Zacharanka was on Alexander Lukashenko's team. After Lukashenko's victory, he became the Minister of Internal Affairs of the Republic of Belarus as well as a Major General of the Internal Service. However, by 1996, he was removed from his post as minister and demoted to a colonel. In 1998, he joined the opposition. He disappeared on 7 May 1999. According to the official version of events, in the area of Zhukovsky Street in Minsk that evening, Zakharanka was violently abducted by unidentified persons and taken away in a car in an unknown direction. Only on 17 September 1999 was a criminal case on the disappearance of the ex-Minister of Internal Affairs opened on the grounds of a crime committed under Article 101 of the Criminal Code of the Republic of Belarus (“Intentional Murder”). According to a former GRU colonel, Uladzimir Baradach, Zakharanka was abducted by people answering to the President of Belarus, Alexander Lukashenko. According to the colonel, Zakharanka was severely tortured, beaten and drugged with psychotropic substances. The general was forced to confess that he had been preparing a coup d'état. Realizing that in court Zakharanka would not confirm his testimony, he was shot. Baradach said that he had managed to get on the trail of the crime. He met with the head of the crematorium of the Northern Cemetery, who, by order of people from the special services, illegally burned Zakharanka's body. Later, the head of the crematorium was beaten, doused with gasoline and burnt.

== Disappearances in 2000 ==
=== Dzmitry Zavadski ===
Since 1994, Dzmitry Zavadski had worked as a cameraman for the First Channel of Belarusian television. Since 1997, he had worked as a cameraman in the bureau of the Russian First Channel. He was abducted and presumably killed on 7 July 2000 when he went to the Minsk-2 airport in an official car to pick up his colleague, Pavel Sheremet. His car was later found at the airport, but Zavadski was never found. In March 2002, the Supreme Court of Belarus sentenced two former officers of the Ministry of Internal Affairs, Valery Ignatovich and Dzmitry Malik, to 10 years in prison for kidnapping (murder was not proven in court) Dzmitry Zavadski. Malik and Ignatovich pleaded not guilty to the abduction of Zavadski, both during the investigation and in court. In another episode of the criminal case, Ignatovich and Malik were sentenced to life imprisonment for the murder of five more people. According to the prosecutor's office, one of the convicts, Valery Ignatovich, had a motive to commit the crime. He allegedly took revenge on the cameraman for the piece in which he had been featured. A shovel with traces of Zavadski's blood was found in Ignatovich's car. According to Pavel Sheremet, the investigation team knows the culprits and circumstances of Zavadski's death. Sheremet himself found out the details of the case shortly after the incident, but did not release them in order to spare the feelings of Dzmitry's family. Nine months after the disappearance of the cameraman, Sheremet gave his first witness testimony at the trial in the Ignatovich case. He told of how Dzmitry had died a few hours after the abduction, how he had been tortured, how his spine had been broken, and how he had then been finished off. Sheremet believed that members of the group that had destroyed opposition politicians (V. Hanchar, Y. Zakharanka and A. Krasouski) and carried out other criminal orders of the Belarusian leadership had been behind the murder of Zavadski. In Sheremet's opinion, the criminals could be found in the circle of the former commander of “Almaz”, Colonel Pavlichenko. According to Sheremet, these persons were carrying out special assignments in Chechnya which Zavadski could have learned about during his trip there, and this circumstance became the motive for the crime. The sources behind Sheremet's detailed awareness were not publicly named.

== Disappearances in 2002 ==
=== Yury Korban ===
23-year-old Yury Korban was the head of the Vitebsk Center for Youth Initiatives “Kontur”, deputy chairman of the local city organization of the Belarusian Popular Front, and the main candidate for the post of head of the regional organization of the Belarusian Popular Front. The 23-year-old Vitebsk opposition activist did not return home on 19 January. However, after that, he called his parents several times, saying that everything was fine with him, and named various places of his location. He asked his parents to collect a large sum of money and bring it to Minsk in order to transfer it to certain people in a certain place. On 28 January, Korban's mother arrived in Minsk. Using his mobile phone, her son arranged a meeting for her to transfer the money not far from the Uskhod metro station. However, no one approached her. Yury Korban called again and, as reported by Nina Korban, said that they would never meet again. The case, initially opened by the department of internal affairs of the Chuhunachny district of Vitebsk, was soon transferred to Minsk, to the apparatus of the Ministry of Internal Affairs. It is handled by the Ministry of Internal Affairs department for locating missing people and by the department for combating organized crime of the city police in Vitebsk. In a conversation with a BelaPAN correspondent, an employee of this department refused to give any details, but assured that the search has been active. It is known that the Vitebsk Financial Investigation Department had opened a criminal case on the misuse of financial resources by the Kontur youth association even before Korban's disappearance. According to the Young Front, the investigators of the department began to summon members of Vitebsk non-governmental organizations and interrogate them in the “Korban case”. The Young Front is also trying to find at least some trace of Yury Korban. The police found that the last mobile phone calls made by him were from the Serabranka microdistrict in Minsk, around the intersection of Rakasouski Avenue and Malinin Street. Members of the Young Front posted hundreds of leaflets with information about Korban and his photograph in the area. The same leaflets were posted in Vitebsk. However, this has not yielded any results yet, and neither has the questioning of citizens who could have seen him in Belarus or even abroad].

== Disappearances in 2020 ==
During the protests following the results of the presidential elections in Belarus in August 2020, the riot police and the police carried out mass arrests of people in the streets. At least some of the detainees were not participants in the opposition demonstrations. Many detainees were severely tortured. After some of the detainees were released, a few died in hospitals; the whereabouts of 10 to 90 people have not been established as of 17 August 2020. On 18 August, the director of the Vaukavysk Military History Museum, 29-year-old Kanstantsin Shyshmakou, was found dead. He had disappeared on 15 August on his way home from work (6 days after his refusal to sign the protocol at the polling station). Kanstantsin Shyshmakou was found by a search group of the “Angel” Search and Rescue team one kilometer away from the city of Masty near the Neman River in the forest. The preliminary cause of death is suicide. On 22 August, in Minsk, Mikita Kryutsou was found hanged. He was one of the people who had gone missing on the way to work on 12 August. Previously, he had participated in a peaceful protest in Maladzechna. According to the official version of the investigation, he committed suicide, although some of his relatives did not believe this version. On 1 September, the Office of the United Nations High Commissioner for Human Rights reported that most of the people missing in Belarus have been found, but the whereabouts and health status of at least 6 people are unknown. On 1 September, it became known that Aliaksandr Budnitski, a 53-year-old employee of the Minsk Gear Plant who had gone missing on 11 August, was found dead, presumably in the park near the Riga department store where protesters had clashed with internal troops and the riot police. The preliminary cause of death was a heart attack.

== Investigation ==
On 23 November 2000, Dmitri Pavlichenko, the commander of the special forces brigade of the Interior Ministry, was arrested. His arrest was preceded by a report from the head of Pre-trial Detention Center No. 1, Aleh Alkaeu, about the seizure of the so-called “firing” pistol on the eve of the disappearances of Zakharanka, Hanchar and Krasouski. Pavlichenko spent about a day in the KGB pre-trial detention center until he was released by the personal order of President Lukashenko. A day later, the president dismissed the Prosecutor General and KGB Chairman V. Matskevich and appointed Viktor Sheiman to the post of Prosecutor General. Pavlichenko, Sheiman, Uladzimir Naumau and Yury Sivakov have been included in the EU's “black list” as their names are associated with the disappearances of people. In 2020, former SOBR fighter Y. Garauski spoke about the circumstances of the murders of Zakharanka, Hanchar, and Krasouski.

== International reaction ==
- In 2000, after considering a periodic report on Belarus, the UN Committee against Torture noted the continuing concern over the disappearances and urged the authorities to “consider establishing an independent impartial governmental and non-governmental national human rights commission with effective credentials to, among other things, promote human rights and investigate all complaints of violations of human rights, in particular those related to the application of the Convention”.
- In 2005, the foreign ministers of 25 EU member states who met in Brussels on Monday expressed “deep concern” over what they considered the deterioration of the situation regarding human rights and political freedoms in Belarus. Such a reaction was caused, in particular, by "the oppression of political parties, independent media and non-governmental organizations, as well as the unwillingness of the authorities to investigate the disappearances of political opponents".
- In 2010, the President of the Russian Federation Dmitry Medvedev called on Lukashenko to investigate the disappearances of people in Belarus.
- In 2014, the US State Department called for an investigation into the disappearances of people in Belarus.
- In 2017, the British Ambassador to Belarus, Fionna Gibb, recorded a video message to the government of Belarus with a call to complete the investigation into the disappearances of Hanchar, Krasouski, Zavadski and Zakharanka.

== Public reaction ==
=== Media reaction ===
In 2009, NTV channel correspondent Aleksey Malkov and cameraman Yury Babenko made a film about the missing politicians in Belarus. It is known that the journalists recorded an interview with Zinaida Hanchar, Viktar Hanchar's wife, as well as with Volha Zavadskaya, Dzmitry Zavadski's mother. On the night of 15 August, they finished their business trip in Belarus and were about to go back to Moscow. However, their stay in Minsk had a rather unexpected outcome. On the evening of 14 August, plainclothes intelligence officers escorted the journalists out of the hotel room of the International Education Center where they were staying. According to the staff of the hotel, the same people checked Malkov and Babenko out of the hotel. After that, they were taken to one of the two departments of internal affairs of the Maskouski district of Minsk. Later, it became known that Alexey Malkov and Yury Babenko were taken to the airport by members of the special services. They spent the night at the airport and were sent to Moscow on the first morning flight. At about 9 am Moscow time, the NTV journalists arrived in Moscow. In 2001, the media published photocopies of documents testifying to the involvement of high-ranking officials of the country in the “high-profile” disappearances.
