= Saltanishki =

Village in Grodno Region, Belarus

Saltanishki Салтанішкі (Belarusian) Солтанишки (Russian) Sołtaniszki • Saltoniškės
- Village
- Interactive map of Saltanishki
- Location within Belarus
- Coordinates: 54°01′N 24°51′E
- Country: Belarus
- Region: Grodno Region
- District: Voranava District
- Population: 178
- Time zone: UTC+3 (MSK)
- Area code: +375 1594

Saltanishki (Belarusian: Салтанішкі, romanized: Saltaniški; Russian: Солтанишки, romanized: Soltanishki) is a village in Voranava District, Grodno Region, Belarus. It is part of Girki selsoviet.

It is located 178 kilometres (111 mi) west of Minsk and 69 km (43 mi) south of Trakai. It is the birthplace of Viktar Sheyman.
