= Hienadź Karpienka =

Belarusian politician and human rights activist

Vice-speaker of Supreme Council of Belarus
- In office 1995–1996
- Chairman: Myechyslaw Hryb

Deputy to the Supreme Council of Belarus/House of Representatives
- In office 1990 – 7 April 1999

Chairman of the Maladzyechna Municipal Executive Committee
- In office 1991 (or 1992) – 1994 (or 1995)

Personal details
- Born: 17 September 1949 Minsk
- Died: 7 April 1999 (aged 49)
- Party: United Civic Party

Dr. Hienadź Karpienka (Belarusian: Генадзь Карпенка, [ɣʲeˈnadzʲ karˈpʲenka]; Russian: Геннадий Карпенко, Gennady Karpenko, September 17, 1949 – April 6, 1999) was a Belarusian scientist and an important politician in opposition to president Alexander Lukashenko.

Hienadz Karpienka was born in Minsk.

In 1987 he was director of the Maladzyechna metallurgy plant.

In 1990 Karpienka defended his doctorate dissertation "Technology of Materials".

Karpienka was author of 50 inventions, which were implemented in 15 countries. In 1994 he was elected corresponding member of the National Academy of Sciences of Belarus.

Karpienka was the MP of two Belarusian parliaments, he was the lead for the commission on science and technology. He was also a member and one of the leaders of the United Civic Party.

In 1992 he became Head of Maladzyechna Executive Committee (i.e. the city mayor). Within two years of becoming mayor, Hienadz Karpienka introduced several local economic reforms, established musical and theatrical festivals, founded a local football club and performed a radical de-sovietization of the city's street names.

In 1996 Karpienka was leading the initiative to impeach President Lukashenka, although this initiative lacked significant support.

In 1998 Karpienka was head of the National Executive Committee, an oppositional shadow government. He was considered as the leader of the Belarusian opposition and as the most probable oppositional candidate for the upcoming presidential elections.

== Unclear circumstances of death ==
On March 31, 1999 Karpienka was taken to the 9th Minsk city hospital with an apparent cerebral hemorrhage. On April 1 he was operated on, but did not regain consciousness. He died on April 6 at seven in the morning.

The death of Hienadz Karpienka was very unexpected, there was no history of such health problems. A month after Karipenka's death, Jury Zacharanka, one of his closest friends and colleagues, was abducted. Within 6 months the same happened to Karpienka's second close colleague Viktar Hanchar. Some in the Belarusian opposition, including Karpienka's family believe these incidents are related.

Political offices
Preceded by ?	Vice-speaker of Supreme Soviet; 1995–1996	Succeeded by ?
Preceded by ?	Mayor of Maladzyechna; 1991–1994	Succeeded by ?
