= SOBR (Belarus) =

Belarusian special police force unit

Special Rapid Response Unit
- Спецыяльны атрад хуткага рэагавання Специальный отряд быстрого реагирования
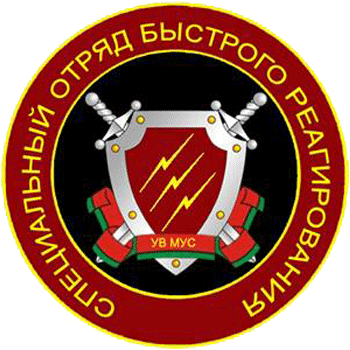
- SOBR/SAChR patch
- Founded: 29 June 1999
- Country: Belarus
- Branch: Internal Troops of Belarus
- Type: Special police
- Size: Around 300
- Part of: Under the 3rd Separate Special-Purpose Brigade
- Deployments: 2020–2021 Belarusian protests

Commanders
- Current commander: Aliaksandr Bykaŭ
- Notable commanders: Dmitri Pavlichenko

The Special Rapid Response Unit (Belarusian: Спецыяльны атрад хуткага рэагавання, romanized: Spiecyjalny atrad chutkaha reahavannia; Russian: Специальный отряд быстрого реагирования, romanized: Spetsialnyy otryad bystrogo reagirovaniya), abbreviated SOBR (Note: Russian: СОБР) or SAChR, (Note: Belarusian: САХР) is a special police unit within the Belarusian Ministry of Internal Affairs. Its current leader is Aliaksandr Bykaŭ.

== History ==
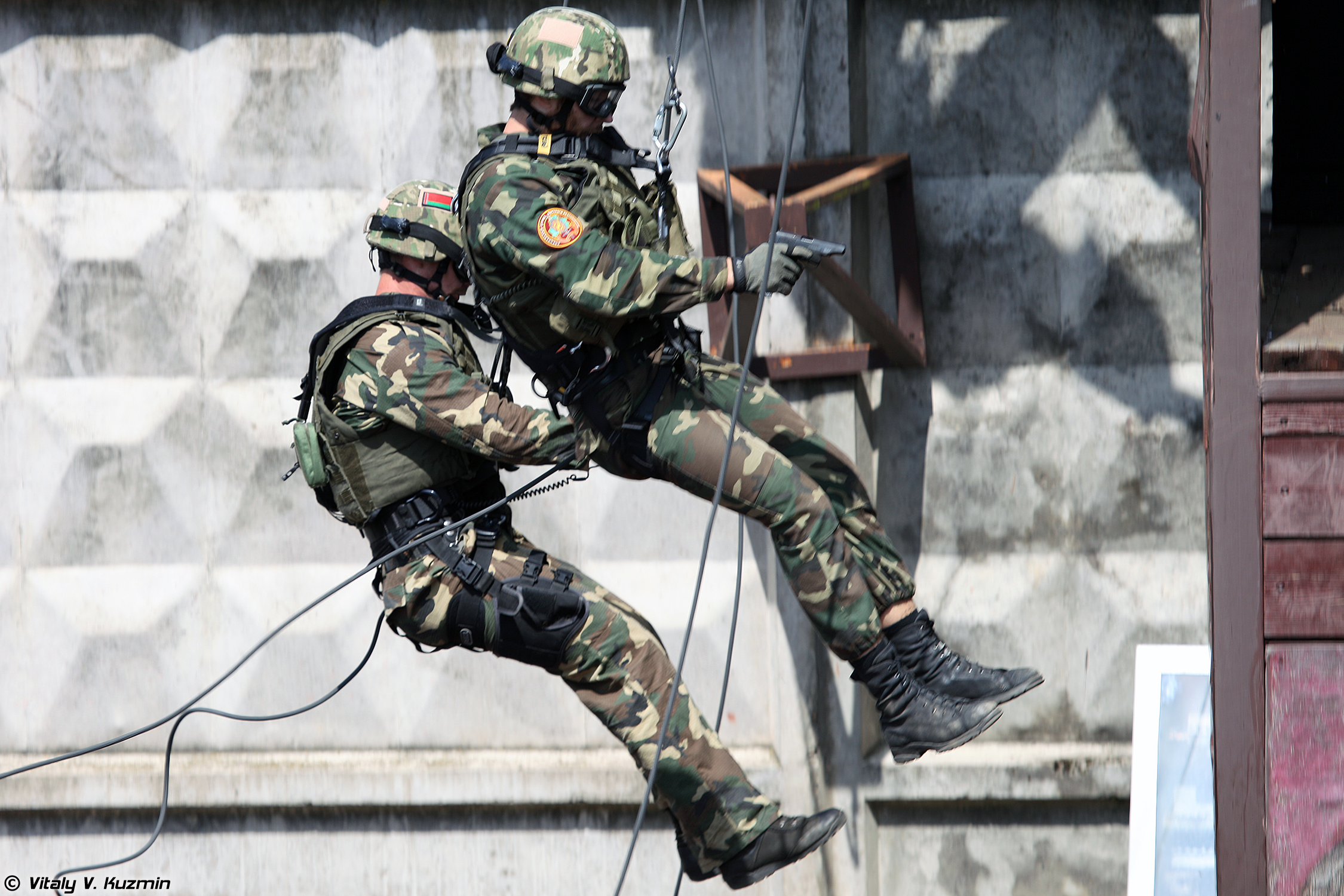
SOBR officers conduct rappelling in the Special purpose triathlon competition 2016.

The Special Rapid Response Unit was formally established on 29 June 1999 by Order 14 of the Ministry of Internal Affairs, as part of the Internal Troops of Belarus. The first formal deployment of SOBR was in the city of Orsha in October 1999, where it was tasked with dismantling a local criminal group.

In August 2009, the unit trained with Venezuelan security forces, alongside the 5th Spetsnaz Brigade, State Security Committee, Presidential Security Service, and Alpha Group. A group of SOBR and Venezuelan security officers climbed Pico Bolívar, where the flags of both Belarus and Venezuela were erected.

On 16 March 2016, SOBR was formally subordinated to the 3rd Separate Special-Purpose Brigade by Ihar Šunievič, Minister of Internal Affairs.

== Organization ==
The SOBR is reportedly made up of 300 persons.

== Controversies ==
SOBR is controversial for its role in attacks against members of the Belarusian opposition, for which it has been accused of being a death squad by various sources.

The head of the force was sanctioned by the European Union for its role in the government crackdown on the 2020–2021 Belarusian protests. The unit also allegedly played a role in the enforced disappearances of opposition leaders Yury Zacharanka, Viktar Hanchar, and Anatol Krasoŭski in 1999, charges that it has denied.

During the 2020–2021 Belarusian protests, SOBR participated in the crackdown on protests alongside OMON.

As a result of its involvement, SOBR leader Aliaksandr Bykaŭ was sanctioned by the European Union in 2020. In July 2023, the unit, along with other Belarusian police force units, met with members of the Wagner Group.

=== Enforced disappearances ===
Both within Belarus and internationally, SOBR is controversial for its alleged role in enforced disappearances of Belarusian opposition members.

Former SOBR officer Yury Harauski has claimed since 2019 that he had been part of the unit that performed the disappearances of Yury Zacharanka, Viktar Hanchar, and Anatol Krasoŭski, saying that the latter two men were abducted while leaving a sauna in Minsk and shot to death by Pavlichenko in the city of Begoml before being buried in the forests.

In 2023, Harauski was arrested in Switzerland under universal jurisdiction, becoming the first Belarusian citizen to be arrested under the principle. During the trial, Harauski admitted his guilt, but also indicted Pavlichenko for the actual murders. Harauski's claims were rejected by members of SOBR, with Pavlichenko alleging he had been removed from the unit due to criminal activities and lower-ranking members asserting without evidence that he had made the claims in return for money.

A former official at the Ministry of Internal Affairs was quoted by Radio Free Europe/Radio Liberty as saying that the information was timed to discredit Lukashenko prior to a meeting with Russian President Vladimir Putin on Belarus-Russia integration.

For its alleged role in enforced disappearances, SOBR has been referred to as a death squad or a "hit squad" by Harauski, Council of Europe lawyer Christos Pourgourides, and the BBC.
