= Viktor Sheiman =

Belarusian politician

- Віктар Шэйман; Виктор Шейман
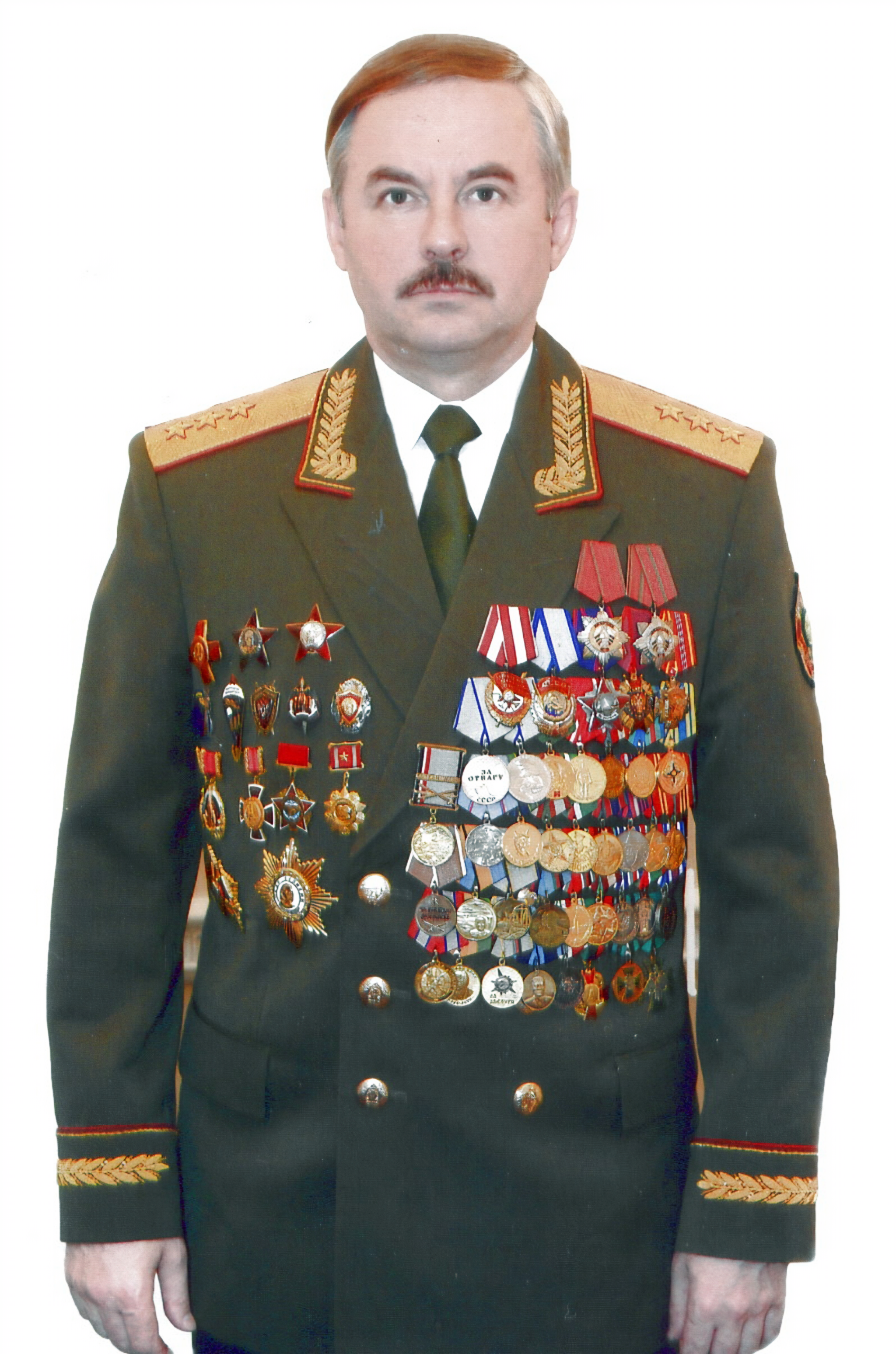

1st State Secretary of the Security Council of the Republic of Belarus
- In office August 5, 1994 – November 27, 2000
- Preceded by: Position established
- Succeeded by: Ural Latypov

Head of the Presidential Administration of Belarus
- In office 29 November 2004 – 5 January 2006
- Preceded by: Ural Latypov
- Succeeded by: Hienadź Nievyhłas

Personal details
- Born: 26 May 1958 (age 68) Saltanishki, Byelorussian SSR, Soviet Union (now Belarus)
- Party: Independent
- Education: Blagoveshchenskoe Tank Command Red Banner School, Ministry of the Interior Academy of the Republic of Belarus

Military service
- Rank: Colonel General

Viktor Vladimirovich Sheiman (Belarusian: Віктар Уладзіміравіч Шэйман, romanized: Viktar Uladzimiravich Sheyman, Russian: Виктор Владимирович Шейман, romanized: Viktor Vladimirovich Sheyman; born 26 May 1958) is a Belarusian politician.

Sheiman has been a close ally of Belarusian ruler Alexander Lukashenko since Lukashenko came to power in 1994. Sheiman was Belarus’ prosecutor general in 2004. Sheiman has been sanctioned by both the European Union and the United States over the human rights abuses, including the disappearances of Lukashenko's critics.

The Pandora Papers leaks revealed that Sheiman and his family secretly owned an offshore company that was active in dealings with Zimbabwe's state-owned mining company at the same time that Sheiman was negotiating trade agreements between Belarus and Zimbabwe on behalf of the Belarusian government.

== Early life ==
He graduated from the Blagoveshchenskoe Tank Command Red Banner School in Gorky Oblast and the Ministry of the Interior Academy of the Republic of Belarus in Minsk. He served in the Soviet Airborne Troops, and participated in the Soviet–Afghan War, eventually attaining the rank of Major General.

== Political life ==
In 1990, he was elected Deputy to the Supreme Soviet of the Byelorussian SSR for the Brest constituency, a post he held until 1994. He was also Secretary of the Commission of the Supreme Soviet for Questions of National Security, Defence and Crime Control. He has been an active supporter of Alexander Lukashenko since his election in 1994. On 5 August 1994, the day the Security Council of Belarus was created by presidential decree, he was appointed Secretary of the Security Council of Belarus.

On 10 August 1994, he was made a member of the Board of the Belarusian Ministry of Defense. On 12 August 1994, he was made a member of the Ministry of Internal Affairs. From 16 December 1995 to 27 November 2000, he held the posts of Secretary of the Security Council of Belarus and Minister of Internal Affairs. On 27 November 2000, he was dismissed from the post of Secretary of the Security Council and made Assistant to the President for National Security. From 28 November 2000 to 29 November 2004, he was Prosecutor General of Belarus.

From 29 November 2004 to 4 January 2006, he was Head of the Administration of the President of Belarus.

On March 20, 2006, he was again appointed Secretary of the Security Council of Belarus.

On 21 April 2007, he was appointed Cochairman of the Belarusian-Venezuelan Joint Commission.

In January 2009, the Press Secretary of the Security Council of Belarus stated that Viktor Sheiman was appointed Assistant to the President for Special Commissions.

Later, Sheiman was again made subject of an EU travel ban and asset freeze, following the crackdown of opposition protests after the 2010 presidential election in Belarus.

In its decision, the Council of the European Union accused Sheiman of being "responsible for the unresolved disappearances of Yuri Zakharenko, Viktor Gonchar, Anatoly Krasovski and Dmitri Zavadski in Belarus in 1999–2000. Former Secretary of the Security Council. Sheiman remains a Special Assistant/Aid to the President."

== Contreversies ==
According to the Pandora Papers, Viktor Sheiman's son Sergei Sheiman owned 50% of offshore company "Midlands Goldfields Foundation" (established in 2017) with Belarusian-American businessman Aleksandr Zingman owning another 50%. This company (via British "Midlands Goldfields Limited") owned 70% of "Zim GoldFields Limited" which operated gold exploration and mining projects in Zimbabwe. Viktor Sheiman visited Zimbabwe at least twice and later reported about the big mining deal with this country. According to the Organized Crime and Corruption Reporting Project, Viktor Sheiman and Aleksandr Zingman visited Zimbabwe together. Political scientist Vytis Jurkonis characterized the offshore scheme with a company of Zingman and Sheiman's son as an example of nepotism and conflict of interest. Journalist Stas Ivashkevich suggested that the business of Sergei Sheiman was created to make a profit from the deals made by Viktor Sheiman on behalf of the Belarusian government.

=== Prosecutor General ===
Viktor Sheiman has been criticized for using his position as Prosecutor General to close down by its action Court decision closed the main oppositional newspaper Svaboda. Political opposition groups and international human rights organizations accuse Sheiman of organizing "death squads" responsible for killing members of organized criminal groups, opposition politicians and Russian Channel One cameraman Dzmitry Zavadski. In 2006, he was placed on a list of over 40 members of the Belarusian government banned from entering the European Union and the United States for allegedly participating in the manipulation of the results of the presidential election; the ban was lifted in 2008.

== Sanctions ==
In 2018, Viktor Sheiman was under sanctions under the US and the EU. The United States extended the sanctions until June 2019, believing that Viktor Sheiman became a barrier to democratic processes in Belarus. In February 2018, the EU extended the sanctions on Viktor Sheiman for a year. This provided for a ban on entry into the EU and blocking bank accounts.

In 2022, Sheiman was blacklisted by Canada. In addition to the countries above, he is also placed on the sanctions list of Switzerland and the United Kingdom. In August 2023, Canada additionally blacklisted Sergei and Olga Sheiman, and Anna Pushkaryova, Viktor Sheiman's children and an alleged business partner, respectively. In April 2026, Ukraine joined the sanctions against Sheiman.

== Ranks and titles ==
- On 6 December 1996 – Major General
- On 28 November 2000 – State Adviser of Justice, II class
- On 25 November 2004 – State Adviser of Justice, I class
- On 29 November 2004 – Higher Class of the Employee of Government Apparatus

== Awards ==
- Order of Merit for the Fatherland, II degree (2003)
- Order of Merit for the Fatherland (1998)
- Order of the Red Banner of Labour
- Order of the Red Star
- Medal For Courage

== Personal life ==
Viktor Sheiman was married, and has a son and a daughter.

Sheiman divorced in 2002. According to an investigation by the Belarusian Investigative Center published in July 2022, Anna Andreyevna Pushkaryova (born 1989)—who was close to Sheiman and frequently accompanied him—gave birth to a son, Mikhail, in 2018. The father was listed as a certain Viktor Vladimirovich Pushkaryov. No individual with that full name exists in the Republic of Belarus, and no such person has ever traveled with Pushkaryova; however, the first name and patronymic match those of Sheiman, who did travel with Pushkaryova and her son. In 2012, at the age of 22, Pushkaryova acquired an apartment in Minsk (valued at 240,000 Belarusian rubles). In 2017, Viktor Sheiman purchased a plot of land in the village of Podlipki (Pukhovichi District) and built a 547-square-meter house, while an adjacent plot and house were registered to Anna Pushkaryova. At various times, Pushkaryova was a co-owner of companies operating in sectors that intersected with the work of the Presidential Property Management Directorate, which was headed by Sheiman. One of her companies, Globalcastcom, was a major player in the smuggling of sanctioned goods into Russia, as well as the "gray" re-export of flowers to that country. After Pushkaryova’s name appeared in independent media reports, she transferred her stakes in Globalcastcom and its subsidiaries to two former employees of the Presidential Security Service and a trusted associate of Sheiman.

According to an investigation by the Belarusian Investigative Center published in 2026, Elena Savchenko gave birth to a son, Vladimir, in 2005; the boy’s father is listed as Viktor Vladimirovich Savchenko—an individual with no corresponding passport record in the Republic of Belarus. Notably, the father’s first name and patronymic match those of Sheiman, who traveled with Elena, her son, and her mother. During the 2000s and 2010s, Elena Savchenko acquired stakes in several companies, commercial properties in Minsk, and various plots of land. Furthermore, Vladimir Savchenko was present in Abkhazia at the same time that Viktor Sheiman was there on an official visit.
