= Day of Solidarity with Belarus =

Belarusian opposition activity

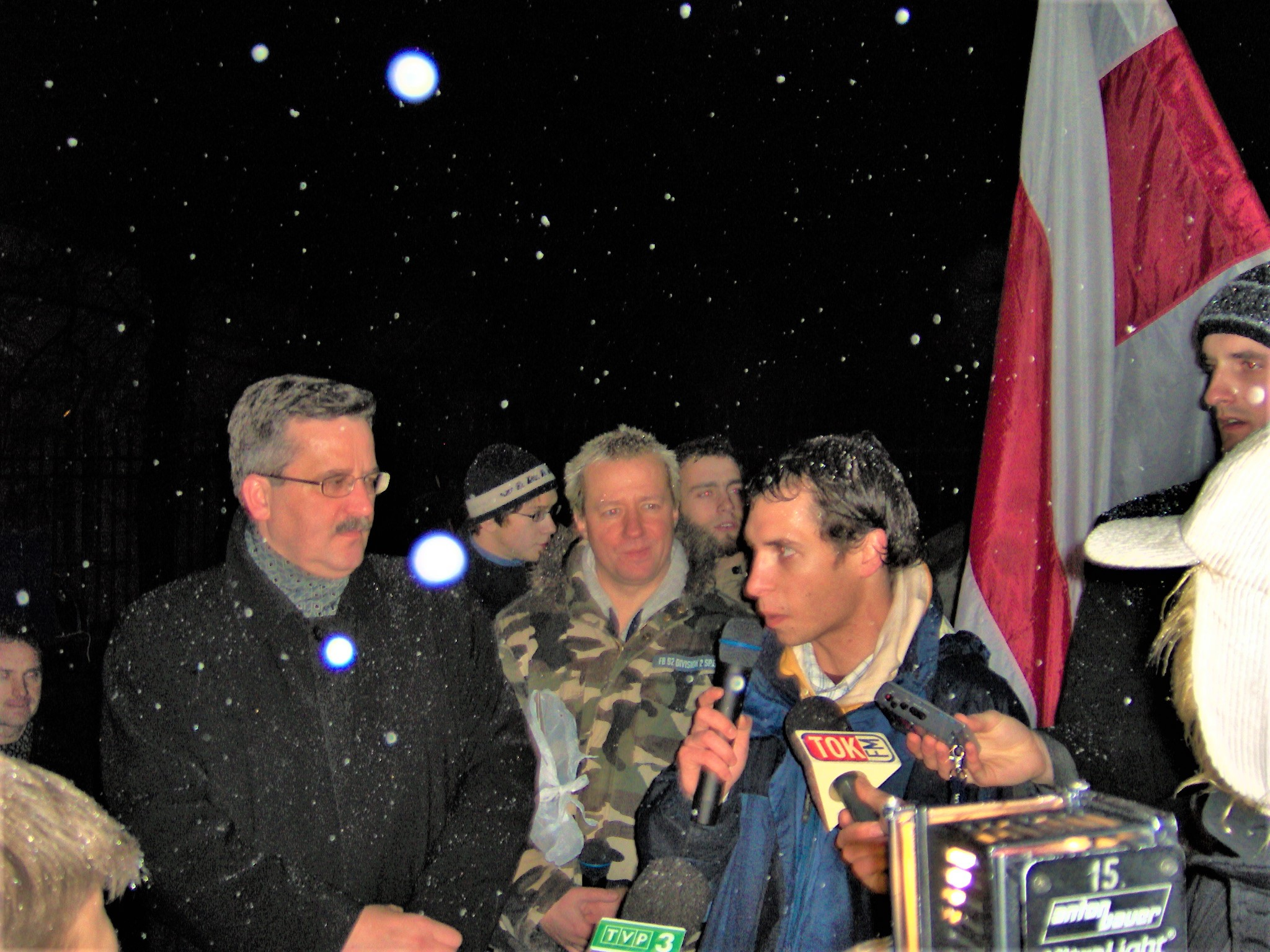
Bronisław Komorowski, future president of Poland, on demonstration in Warsaw, 16.12.2005

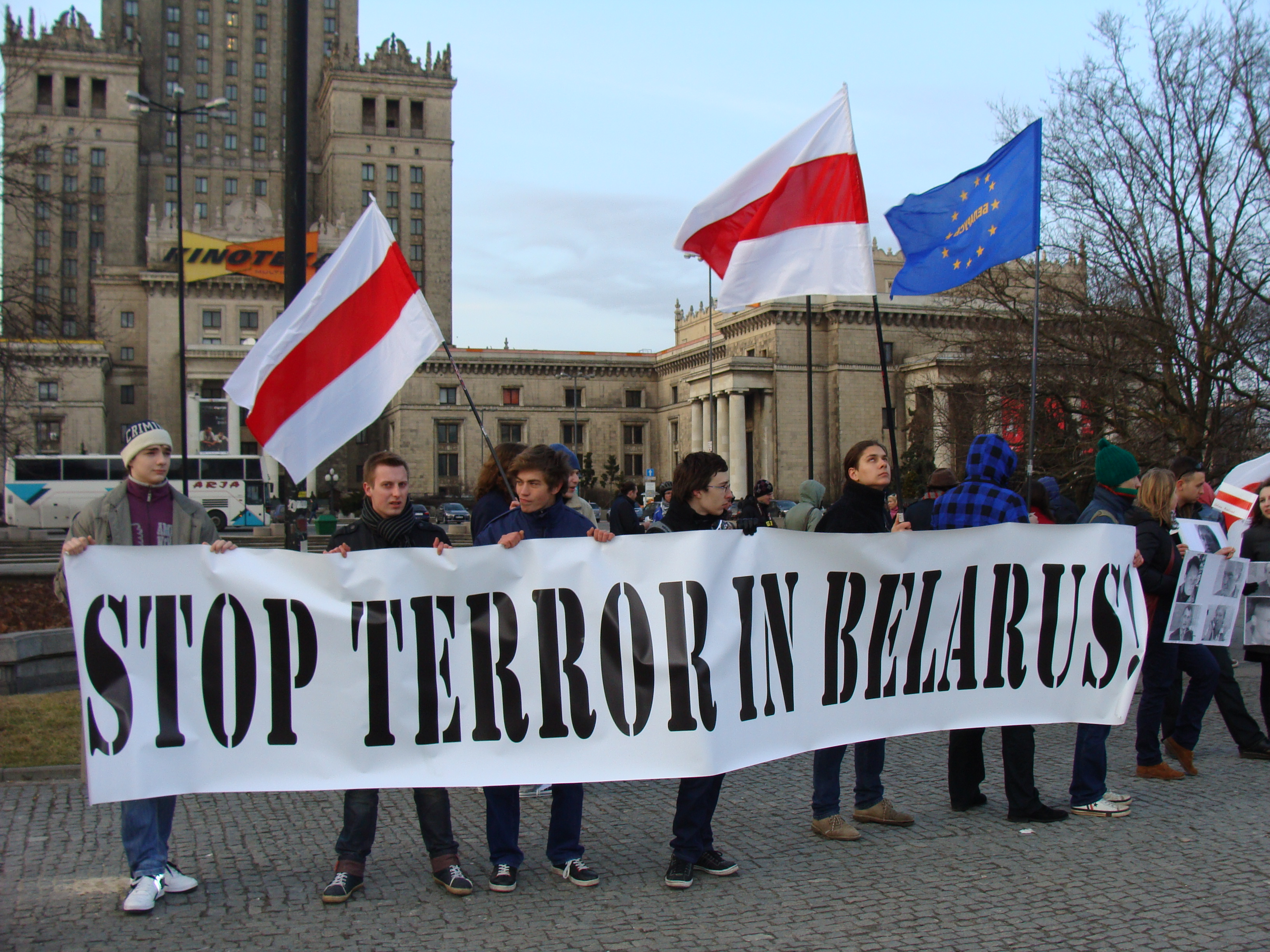
Students of the Kalinoŭski Programme on a demonstration, 16.03.2011

A Day of Solidarity with Belarus (Belarusian: Дзень нашай салідарнасці, romanized: Dzień našaj salidarnasci) is an action proposed by the Belarusian journalist Iryna Khalip, supported by the civic initiative We Remember and the Zubr movement.

Let us all together switch off the light in our apartments for several minutes on October 16 evening, and put burning candles on the windows. We should imagine Belarus in which we could live. Maybe everything is to start with that. Dark cities, dark windows, where only shadows of burning candles are seen - this could become a mirror for us to see that we are really many!

It was offered to announce October 16, 2005 to be a Day of Solidarity with Belarusian "political prisoners", the "disappeared" persons Yury Zakharanka, Viktar Hanchar, Anatol Krasouski, and Dzmitry Zavadski, their families, and other advocates of a transition to representative democracy and to a market economy in Belarus. Belarusians are called to turn their light off for 15 minutes on October 16, at 8 p.m, and put burning candles to their window boards as a solidarity sign.

An estimated 100,000 people took part in the action. Encouraged, it was proposed to carry out this action on 16th day of each month.

== See also ==
- Belarusian democracy movement
- Jeans Revolution
- Belarus Free Theatre
- Under the Radar Festival
- A Lesson of Belarusian
