= Jury Chaščavacki =

Belarusian film director and scenarist (1947–2026)

Jury Jazépavič Chaščavacki, also spelled Yury Khashchavatski (Belarusian: Ю́ры Язэ́павіч Хашчава́цкі; Ukrainian: Юрій Йосипович Хащавацький, romanized: Yurii Yosypovych Khashchavatskyi; Russian: Юрий Иосифович Хащеватский; 18 October 1947 – 23 July 2026) was a Belarusian film director and scenarist, known for his films Kalinovski Square, Prisoners of the Caucasus, Orange Vests, and An Ordinary President.

== Life and career ==
Jury Jazépavič Chaščavacki was born in Odesa, Ukrainian SSR on 18 October 1947. In 2002, he was arrested following participation in a protest of the Belarusian government. He spent 10 days in jail. He claimed he spent the time in jail giving lectures to other inmates about documentary film techniques.

During the 2020 Belarusian protests he became a member of the Coordination Council of Sviatlana Tsikhanouskaya.

Yuri Khashchavatski's documentary, Prisoners of the Caucasus, utilises footage from the files of "four freelance cameramen" of the wars in Chechnya as a source.

Chaščavacki died on 23 July 2026, at the age of 78.

== Credits ==
=== Film director ===
- 1987: Krylov Was Here (Тут быў Крылоў)
- 1991: Orange Vests (Аранжавыя жылеты)
- 1992: Russian Luck (Рускае шчасце)
- 1996: An Ordinary President (Звычайны прэзідэнт)
- 2002: Prisoners of the Caucasus (Каўказскія нявольнікі)
- 2003: Oleg Popov - Der Sonnenclown (Сонечны клоўн)
- 2007: Kalinovski Square (Плошча)

=== Writer ===
- Ploshcha (Kalinovski Square, 2007)
- Kavkazkie plenniki (Prisoners of the Caucasus, 2002)
- Obyknovennyj prezident (An Ordinary President, 1996)

== Awards ==
- 1998 – Nestor Almendros Award for Obyknovennyj prezident (1996) at Human Rights Watch International Film Festival
- 2002 – Honorable Mention for Kavkazkie plenniki (2002) at Dok Leipzig
