= Viktar Hanchar =

Belarusian politician and pro-democracy activist (1957–1999)

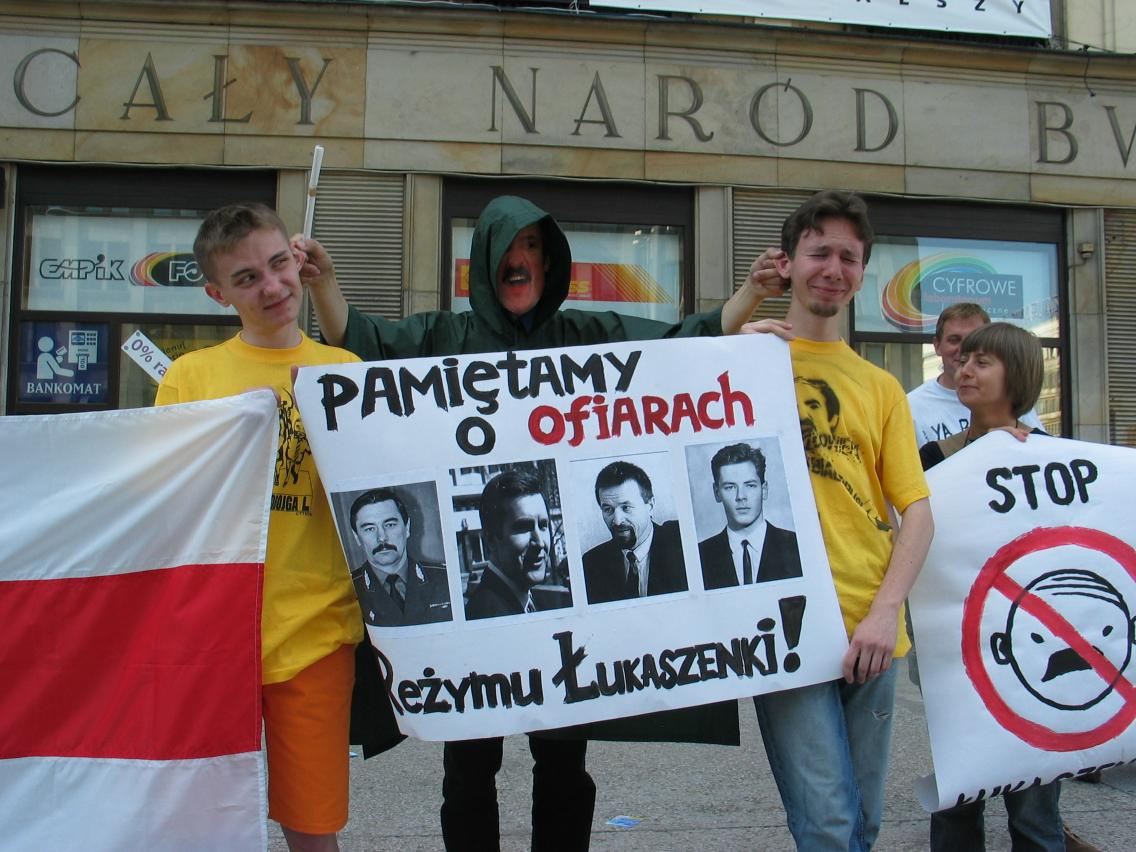
- Protest in Poland against disappearances of opposition in Belarus, the second photo from the left is Viktar Hanchar

Deputy to the House of Representatives
- Disappeared on 16 September 1999 (aged 42)
- In office 9 January 1996 – 9 January 2001

Personal details
- Born: September 7, 1957 Radichevo, Slutsk District, Minsk Region, Byelorussian SSR, Soviet Union
- Party: United Civic Party

Viktar Hanchar, or Viktar Hančar (Belarusian: Віктар Ганчар, Russian: Виктор Гончар, Viktor Gonchar, September 7, 1957 – disappeared September 16, 1999) was a Belarusian politician who disappeared and was presumably murdered in 1999. He was born in the village of Radzichava, Slutsk Raion.

Hanchar graduated from the Law Department of the Belarusian State University in 1979 and worked as legal researcher at several major Belarusian institutions.

== Political career ==
Beginning in May 1991, Hanchar served as first deputy mayor of Maladzyechna. In May 1994, he ran for the Constitutional Court of Belarus, but did not receive the support of most MPs.

During the 1994 presidential election, Hanchar was one of the most active in the election campaign headquarters of Alexander Lukashenko. In 1994, after Lukashenko's victory in the presidential elections, Hanchar was appointed Deputy Prime Minister of Belarus, but soon resigned. Hanchar joined the opposition to the president and joined the United Civic Party, becoming a member of its Political Council (since 1995). In 1995–1996 he was general secretary of the CIS Economic Court.

In 1995, Hanchar was elected to the Supreme Soviet of Belarus. In 1996 he was appointed chairman of the Central Election Committee (CEC), and actively opposed to Lukashenko during the 1996 referendum. In 1996, he was dismissed by the president from his position. Hanchar never recognized the results of the 1996 referendum as legitimate. In 1998, Hanchar led an alternative Election Committee during the 1999 presidential election, organized by the opposition as a protest against constitutional reforms by Lukashenko.

== Disappearance ==
Hanchar disappeared in Minsk on September 16, 1999, along with his friend the businessman Anatol Krasouski. Pieces of broken glass and blood were found at the site where Hanchar and Krasouski had been last seen. On December 5, 2002, they were officially declared missing by the court. In January 2003, the Chief Prosecutor of Minsk suspended the criminal investigation into the disappearance of Hanchar and Krasouski.

According to the former head of jail number 1 Oleg Alkaev (Aleh Alkaeu), Viktar Hanchar was abducted and executed on the order of people close to President Lukashenko. The investigation into the disappearance of Hanchar and Krasouski is one of the main issues of the Belarusian opposition, and is also mentioned in the documents of international organizations.

In September 2004, the European Union and the United States issued travel bans for four Belarusian officials suspected of being involved in the kidnapping of Hanchar: Interior Affairs Minister Vladimir V. Naumov, Prosecutor General Viktor Sheiman, Minister for Sports and Tourism Yuri Sivakov, and Colonel Dmitri Pavlichenko from the Belarus Interior Ministry.

For several years the Belarusian opposition has organized the Day of Solidarity with Belarus on the 16th of every month to commemorate the disappearance of Hanchar, Krasouski, Jury Zacharanka, Dzmitry Zavadski, and the mysterious death of Hienadz Karpienka.

In December 2019, Deutsche Welle published a documentary film in which Yury Harauski, a former member of the Special Rapid Response Unit, confirmed that it was his unit that had arrested, taken away and murdered pro-democracy activist Yury Zakharanka, and that they later did the same with Viktar Hanchar and Anatol Krasouski. Harauski fled to Switzerland in 2018, seeking asylum. In 2023 Harauski was arrested and charged with the forced disappearance of Zacharanka, Hanchar and Krasouski. Harauski's trial in a Swiss court opened on 19 September 2023. Due to numerous contradictions in his statements, the Swiss court did not consider it proven that Harauski was actually involved in the killings. Human rights defenders from Trial International were disappointed with the judges' decision.

== See also ==
- List of people who disappeared mysteriously (2000–present)

Political offices
Preceded by ?	Head of Central Electoral Commission; 1996	Succeeded by Lidia Yermoshina
Preceded by ?	Deputy Prime Minister; 1994	Succeeded by ?
