= Dmitri Pavlichenko =

Belarusian police officer

Dmitri Valeriyevich Pavlichenko (Belarusian: Дзьмітры Валер'евіч Паўлічэнка, Russian: Дмитрий Валерьевич Павличенко; alternative spellings: Dmitry, Dzmitry, Dzmitri, Vasilyevich, Pavliuchenko, Pawliuchenka; born 1966 in Vitebsk) is head of the Belarusian Special Rapid Reaction Unit (SOBR).

== Allegations of assassinations ==
In February 2004, Christos Pourgourides of the Council of Europe's Committee on Legal Affairs and Human Rights reported concerns suggesting that Dmitri Pavlichenko, along with other "senior officials of the State" had been involved in the assassination of several people, including senior politicians.

He stated that the Chief of the Criminal Police of Belarus, General Lapatik, in a handwritten note on November 21, 2000, accused Dmitri Pavlichenko of assassinating Jury Zacharanka, a former Minister of the Interior who disappeared on May 7, 1999, with a PB pistol, normally used for carrying out the death penalty at SIZO-1 prison, officially signed out from SIZO-1 on the orders of the Minister of the Interior, Sivakov. He also stated suspicions that Pavlichenko was involved in the disappearances of Victor Gonchar, Vice-President of the Parliament of Belarus and businessman Anatoly Krasovski on September 16, 1999.

Pavlichenko was arrested on November 22, 2000. According to Pourgourides' report, the warrant stated (translation)

The materials of the operational investigation contain trustworthy data confirming that Dmitry Vasiliyevich Pavlichenko is the organiser and head of a criminal body engaged in abduction and physical elimination of people. In particular, the criminal group headed by D.V. Pavlichenko was involved in assassinating G. V. Samoylov, the leader of the RNE, Belarusian unregistered regional organisation, as well as in murdering other individuals. Taking into consideration the fact that D.V. Pavlichenko and his criminal group may commit further crimes of particular violence, [...], decided [to apply a preventive detention for 30 days].

— Chief of the Belarusian KGB, Lt. Gen. Uładzimir Mackievič (December 1995–November 2000),

While the warrant stated that the detention would be for 30 days, Pavlichenko was released a few days later, either on November 23 (according to Prosecutor General Viktor Sheyman, who became Prosecutor General on November 27) or on November 27 (according to Colonel Oleg Alkayev, head of SIZO-1 at the time, who was later granted political asylum in Germany). Pourgourides states that the Zakharenko family's lawyer, Volchek, stated that President Alexander Lukashenko had personally ordered Pavlichenko's release from prison. The Head of KGB (Mackiewicz) and other top Belarusian officials were fired for the arrest. He also states that the Minister of Agriculture, Leonov, had personally told him that Lukashenko had "violently criticised the KGB for arresting Pavlichenko" on television. Lukashenko also immediately (in November 2000) fired the Head of KGB and some other top Belarusian officials for the arrest of Pavlichenko and attempts to investigate the murders.

The Governing Council of the Inter-Parliamentary Union has expressed its concern about these allegations. Pavlichenko is now subject to international sanctions of the United States, the European Union, the United Kingdom, Switzerland and Canada among with several other Belarusian senior officials and politicians.

In December 2019, Deutsche Welle published a documentary film in which Yury Garavski, a former member of a special unit of the Belarusian Ministry of Internal Affairs, confirmed that it was his unit which had arrested, taken away Yury Zacharanka, Viktar Hanchar and Anatol Krassouski and that it was Pavlichenko who by hand shot them dead.

In August 2020, he was identified as the commander of an OMON detachment during the 2020 Belarusian protests.
