= Yury Zacharanka =

Belarusian politician and pro-democracy activist

Yuryj Zacharanka
- Юрый Захаранка
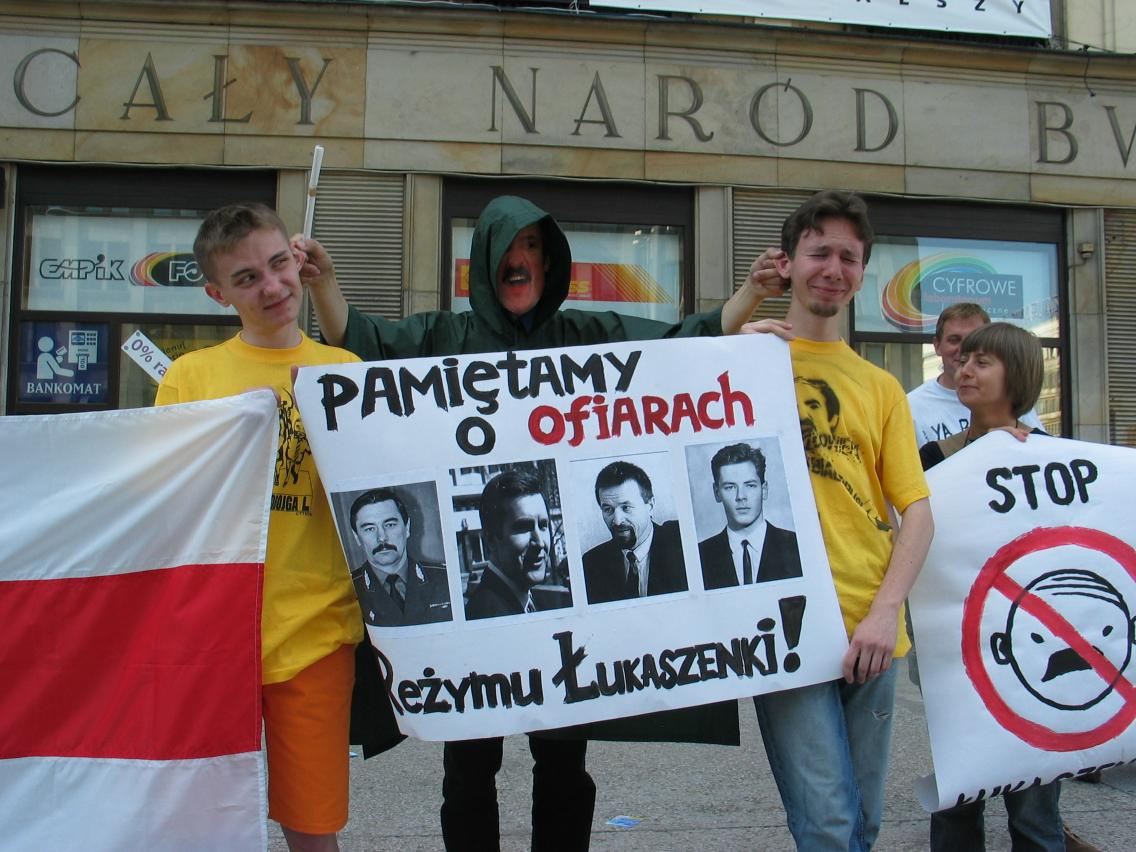
- Protest in Poland against disappearances of opposition in Belarus, the first photo from the left is Viktar Hanchar

Minister of Internal Affairs
- In office 28 July 1994 – 16 October 1995
- President: Alexander Lukashenko
- Prime Minister: Mikhail Chyhir
- Preceded by: Uladzimir Danko
- Succeeded by: Valiantsin Ahalets

Personal details
- Born: 4 January 1952 Vasilyevichy, Polesia Region, Byelorussian SSR, Soviet Union
- Party: United Civic Party of Belarus
- Spouse: Volha Zakharanka
- Children: two daughters

Military service
- Allegiance: Soviet Union; Belarus
- Branch/service: Law Enforcement
- Rank: Major general (1994); Colonel (1996)
- Commands: Inter-regional Directorate for Combating Organized Crime
- Disappeared: 7 May 1999 (aged 47)
- Status: Missing for 26 years, 9 months and 20 days

Colonel Yuryj Mikalajevich Zacharanka (Belarusian: Юрый Мікалаевіч Захаранка, romanized: Juryj Mikalajevič Zacharanka; Russian: Юрий Николаевич Захаренко, romanized: Yuriy Nikolaevich Zakharenko; 4 January 1952 – disappeared 7 May 1999) was a Belarusian military officer, politician, and pro-democracy activist who served as Minister of Internal Affairs from 1994 to 1995. Following his departure from office, Zakharanka became a leading member of the Belarusian opposition, leading to his enforced disappearance and likely death in 1999.

== Early life ==
Yury Zakharanka was born in a small Belarusian town of Vasilyevichy, Rechytsa Raion. His parents met in a labor camp in Cologne, Germany, in 1943. His father was Belarusian while his mother was of Ukrainian origin.

Zakharanka has a daughter with Volha Zakharanka.

== Political career ==
At the moment when Belarus gained independence Zakharanka was deputy chief of the USSR MVD Inter-regional Directorate for Combating Organized Crime. In 1994 he was appointed Minister of Internal Affairs of Belarus. On October 16, 1995, he was dismissed from this position by president Alexander Lukashenko. Zakharanka joined the opposition to the president and was elected member of the governing board of the United Civic Party of Belarus. It was reported that Zakharanka retained some support among senior officers of the military and security services State Security Committee (KGB), he was considered a political threat to Lukashenko.

== Abduction ==
The ex-minister disappeared on the evening of May 7, 1999. According to opposition activists and human rights groups, the state made limited efforts to investigate Zakharanka's disappearance. Several years later the former MVD official Aleh Alkaeu fled to Germany and stated that he was witness to Zakharanka and several other abducted opposition leaders being murdered on the orders of top government officials. In commemoration of the abducted politicians and political prisoners of Belarus, the Belarusian opposition and its supporters have The Day of Solidarity with Belarus on the 16th of every month.

In September 2004, the European Union and the United States issued travel bans for five Belarusian officials suspected of being involved in the kidnapping of Zakharanka: Interior Affairs Minister Vladimir Naumov, Prosecutor General Viktor Sheiman, Minister for Sports and Tourism Yuri Sivakov, and Colonel Dmitry Pavlichenko from the Belarus Interior Ministry.

In December 2019, Deutsche Welle published a documentary film in which Yury Harauski, a former member of the Special Rapid Response Unit, stated that his unit had arrested, taken away, and murdered Zakharanka, and that they later did the same with Viktar Hanchar and Anatol Krasouski. Harauski fled to Switzerland in 2018, seeking asylum. In 2023 Harauski was arrested and charged with the forced disappearance of Zacharanka, Hanchar and Krasouski. Harauski's trial opened on 19 September 2023, but he was acquitted after the court determined that the allegations could not be proven beyond a reasonable doubt.

== See also ==
- List of people who disappeared mysteriously in the 1990s
