= Law enforcement in Belarus =

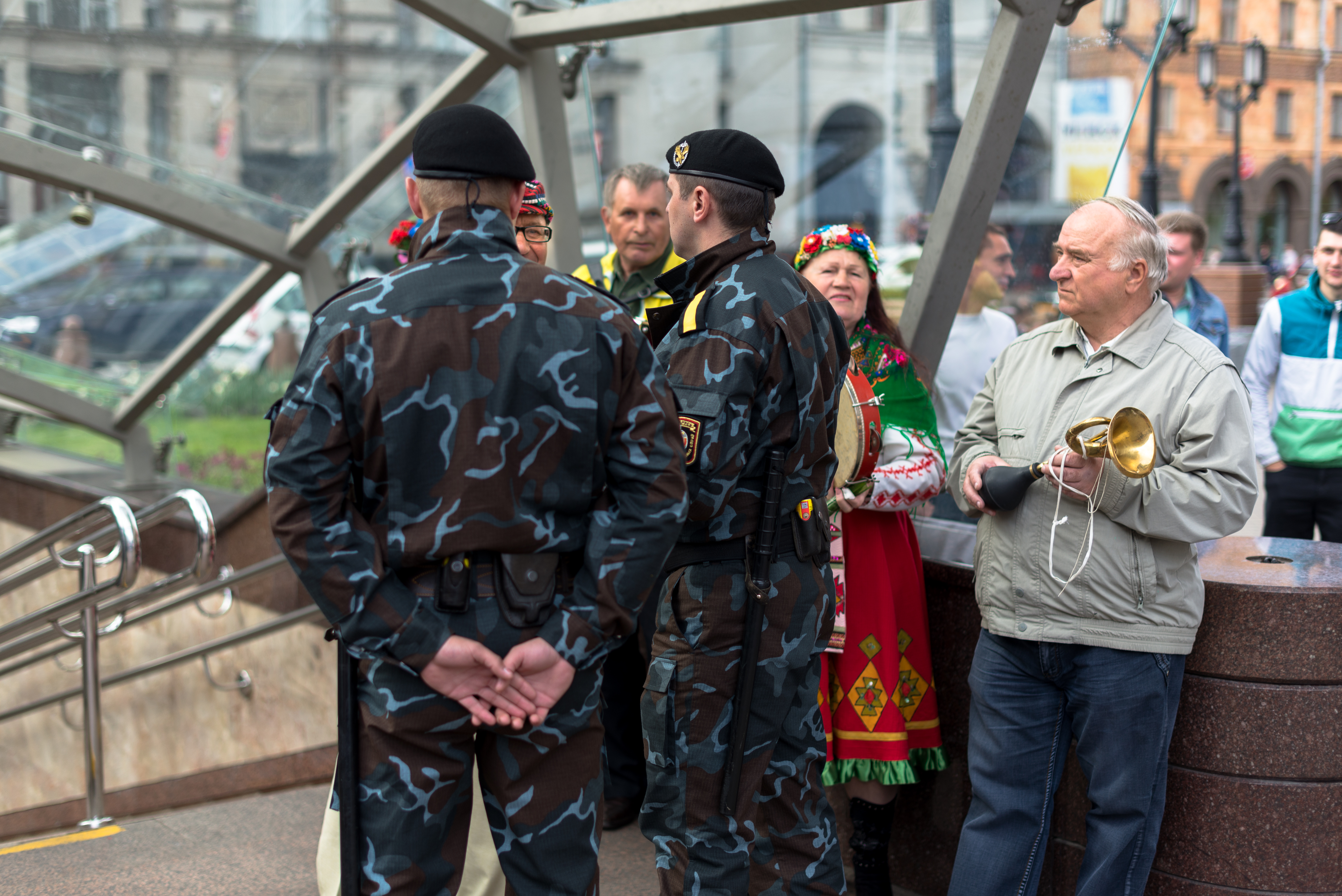
Policemen during the Victory Day (9 May) celebrations in Minsk (2014).

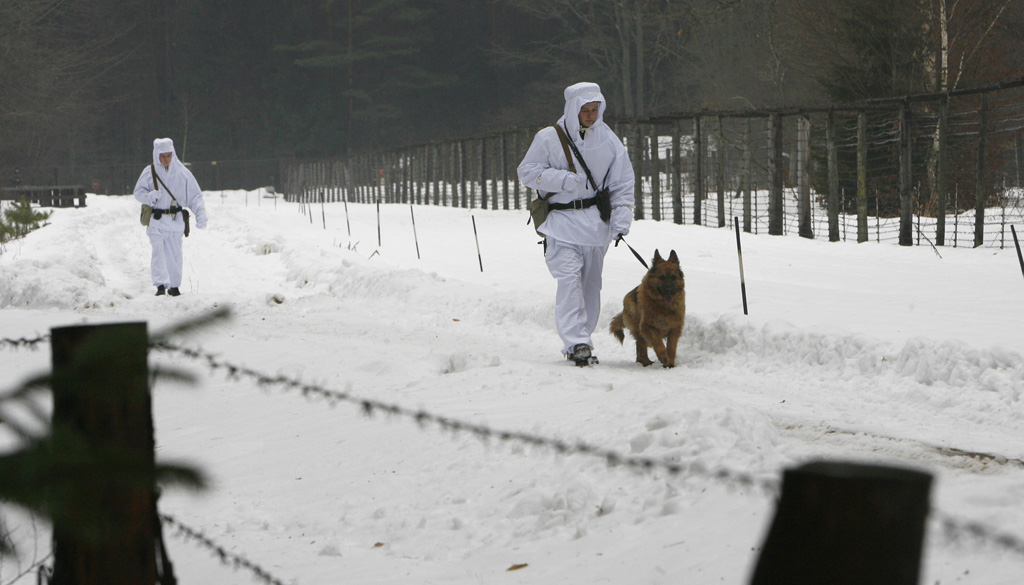
Belarusian border guards patrol the Poland Belarus border.

Law enforcement in Belarus is the responsibility of a variety of agencies such as the Militsiya, as well as other agencies such as the Presidential Guard and the State Security Agency of the Republic of Belarus, all under the authority of the country's Ministry of Internal Affairs.

== List of agencies ==
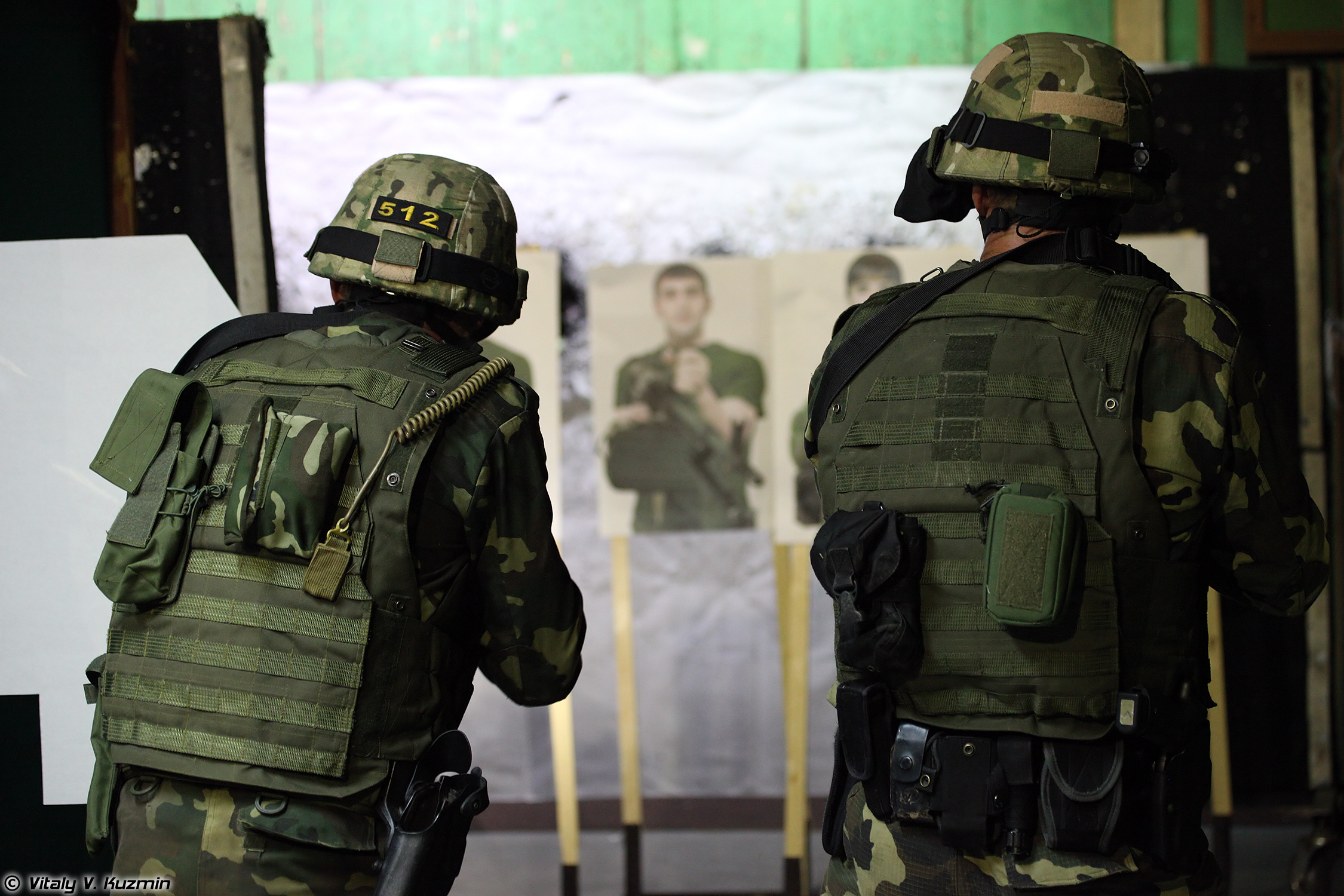
Members of the Belarusian SOBR team.

- Militsiya (Міліцыя) is the police service of Belarus, under the supervision of the Ministry of Internal Affairs, which considered as the main policing and law enforcement agency in Belarus.
- Internal Troops (Унутраныя войскі) is a uniformed paramilitary gendarmerie force.
  - 6th Independent Special Police Brigade of the Internal Troops
- OMON (АМАП) is a system of special police units in the Militsiya (distinct from the Russian OMON)
- Special Rapid Response Unit
- Secret police organizations
  - Presidential Guard
  - State Security Agency of the Republic of Belarus (KDB in Belarusian, KGB in Russian)
- State Forensic Examination Committee of the Republic of Belarus
- Investigative Committee of the Republic of Belarus
- Prosecutor General of Belarus

== Cooperation with international agencies ==
The Ministry of Internal Affairs has cooperated with several international law enforcement organisations including Interpol and the United Nations Office on Drugs and Crime. Examples also include the Organization for Security and Co-operation in Europe which, under the auspices of many projects and programmes, has helped develop Belarusian law enforcement capabilities.

== Prisons ==
- Amerikanka
- Pishchalauski Castle

== World War II German occupation of Belarus ==
- Byelorussian Auxiliary Police (Defunct)
