= Nikolay Karpenkov =

Belarusian intelligence officer

- Мікалай Мікалаевіч Карпянкоў

Deputy Minister of Internal Affairs of Belarus
- Incumbent
- Assumed office 19 November 2020
- President: Alexander Lukashenko

Personal details
- Born: Mikalai Karpiankou; 6 September 1968 (age 58) Minsk, Belarusian SSR, Soviet Union
- Education: Minsk Suvorov Military School (1985); Ulyanovsk Tank Military School (1989); Ministry of the Interior Academy of the Republic of Belarus (2003)

Military service
- Allegiance: Soviet Union (1989–1991); Belarus (1991–1993)

Mikalai Mikalayevič Karpiankou (Belarusian: Мікалай Мікалаевіч Карпянкоў, Russian: Николай Николаевич Карпенков, Nikolay Nikolayevich Karpenkov, born on 6 September 1968 in Minsk) is a state security official of the government of Alexander Lukashenko in Belarus. He is a Deputy Minister of Internal Affairs of Belarus and the incumbent Commander of Internal Troops of Belarus.

== Biography ==
Born in Minsk, Karpiankou graduated from the Minsk Suvorov Military School in 1985 and a Tank Military School in Ulyanovsk, Russia, in 1989.

After several years of military service, Karpiankou enrolled to work for the Interior Ministry of the newly independent Belarus.

For some time between mid-1990s and 2003 he served in the Security Service of president Alexander Lukashenko.

Between 2003 and 2010 Karpiankou was commander of Almaz, a special unit of the Interior Ministry. In this role he reportedly participated in political repressions against opponents of Lukashenko, notably during the 2006 Belarusian presidential election. From 2010 till 2014 Karpiankou held various positions in the Interior Ministry. In 2014 he headed GUBOPiK, another unit of the Interior Ministry. On 19 November 2020 Karpiankou was appointed Deputy Minister of Internal Affairs and Commander of Internal Troops of Belarus.

== Role during the 2020–2021 protests ==
Karpiankou was noticed among state security officials who personally participated in the crackdown of mass protests that followed a controversial presidential election. On 6 September 2020, Karpiankou smashed the glass door of a café in Minsk while pursuing protesters fleeing from him. It was arguably the only glass window broken during protests with hundreds of thousands of protesters participating. He was also identified among security officials who kidnapped and tortured another protester in Minsk.

In November 2020, Sviatlana Tsikhanouskaya initiated the recognition of GUBOPiK, the unit led by Karpiankou, as a terrorist organization for its participation in police brutality.

On 15 January 2021, Belarusian independent media published an audio recording of Karpiankou allegedly speaking to interior troops and making shocking comments on the ongoing protests.

Karpiankou commented on the death of Aliaksandr Tarajkouski, a protester murdered by police:

“Tarajkouski, a drunk and an idiot. Of course, he was killed by the rubber bullet that hit him on the chest. He stood there in a T-shirt and I think it wouldn’t get stuck on the other side.”

Referring to an order from Lukashenka personally, Karpiankou instructed the troops to be ready to kill protesters:

“as president said, if someone’s pushing toward you – use your weapon, it comes out. Non-lethal. Point-blank: legs, stomach, balls. So that he understands what he’s done after he regains consciousness. Just inflict some injuries of some description… Cripple him, mutilate him, kill him. Use your weapon and shoot him right in the forehead, right in the face, right in the point of no return to the condition he was in before this. If they resuscitate him, alright then. He’ll be missing half his brain, well, good riddance. Because, basically, all those who take to the streets at the moment to participate in the ‘rail war’, it turns out, those who block the roads, attack the police, throw Molotov cocktails – they are terrorists. These are superfluous people in our country. And a lot, a lot was said about this in the little consultation president had convened.”

He also spoke of the government's plans to establish a concentration camp for protesters:

“A database is being created. In this database, those arrested for the second time, must stay in it. The assignment: to develop and build a camp, build a camp, but not for prisoners of war or even the interned, but a camp for the especially sharp-hoofed, for resettlement. And surround it with barbed wire along the perimeter. Set up two premises: a floor with a furnace, and a floor for feeding, to make sure they work. But they must be kept there, until it all calms down. The head of state covers us from all angles in terms of using firearms.”

On 2 February 2021, TUT.BY got the results of the phonoscopic analysis of the record made public by BYPOL. Talks on the killing of Alexander Taraikovsky and more are on the record. The expert test made it clear that the Nikolai Karpenkov's voice is on the record and there are no signs of changes made to it.

In April 2021, Karpiankou voiced public threats to exiled members of the opposition in an interview on Belarus state television.

== International sanctions ==
On 20 November 2020, Karpiankou was included in sanctions lists of Latvia and Estonia.

On 21 June 2021, the U.S. Treasury has added Karpiankou to its Specially Designated Nationals and Blocked Persons List with the following motivation:

Mikalai Karpiankou (Karpiankou) is Belarus’ Deputy Minister of Internal Affairs and the current Commander of the Internal Troops. In his previous role as head of GUBOPiK, Karpiankou personally led members of GUBOPiK in pursuing and beating peaceful protesters in Minsk, the capital city of Belarus. In January 2021, a leaked audio recording allegedly captured Karpiankou discussing plans to build an internment camp for detained protesters and advising security services to shoot protesters in the face and genitals.

He was also sanctioned by the European Union, the United Kingdom, Switzerland, and Canada.

In January 2025, Canada imposed sanctions against Igor Karpenkov and Irina Karpenkova, the son and wife of Nikolai Karpenkov, respectively.

== See also ==
- Human rights issues related to the suppression of the 2020 Belarusian protests
