= Alexander Barsukov =

Alexander Barsukov may refer to:

- Alexander Barsukov (Belarusian politician) (born 1965), deputy minister of internal affairs
- Alexander Barsukov (Russian politician) (1955–2026), LDP member in Karelia
