= Anatoly Kuleshov =

Belarusian politician and policeman (born 1959)

- Анатоль Куляшоў

Minister of Internal Affairs of Belarus
- In office 2 June 2009 – 11 May 2012
- President: Alexander Lukashenko
- Preceded by: Uladzimir Navumau
- Succeeded by: Igor Shunevich

Personal details
- Born: 25 July 1959 (age 67) Ali Bayramli, Azerbaijani SSR, Soviet Union
- Education: Higher School of the Ministry of Internal Affairs of the USSR; Ministry of the Interior Academy of the Republic of Belarus
- Profession: Police

Military service
- Allegiance: USSR; Belarus
- Branch/service: Internal Troops of the Soviet Union; Internal Troops of Belarus

Anatoly Nilovich Kuleshov (also transliterated as Anatoli or Anatol; Belarusian: Анатоль Нілавіч Куляшоў; born 25 July 1959) is a Belarusian politician and policeman. He most notably served as Minister of Internal Affairs of Belarus from 2009 to 2012. During his tenure, he led the ministry's response to the 2010 Belarusian protests in the aftermath of the 2010 Belarusian presidential election and the response to the 2011 Minsk Metro bombing.

== Early life ==
Kuleshov was born on 25 July 1959 in the city of Ali Bayramli, which was then part of the Azerbaijani SSR in the Soviet Union (now Azerbaijan). After joining the Ministry of Internal Affairs of the USSR in the Belarusian SSR in 1980, he graduated from the Ministry of the Interior Academy of the Republic of Belarus in 1986. He then attended the Higher School of the Ministry of Internal Affairs of the USSR, which he also graduated from in 1992 after the collapse of the Soviet Union.

After graduating, he served in various roles in the newly created Ministry of Internal Affairs of Belarus. He first worked as an operative for the Deputy Head of the Criminal Investigations Department within the Minsk branch. Afterwards, he headed the Department of Internal Affairs of both the Zavodski District and Frunzyenski District within Minsk. On 8 May 2001, he was promoted by decree of Alexander Lukashenko to be the Head of the Department of Internal Affairs of Gomel Oblast, which he would do for another two years. After two years, he was appointed as Head of the Department of Internal Affairs for Minsk, which meant he was also head of the police in Minsk. In August 2008, he was moved and appointed Deputy Minister of Internal Affairs, which he did for a few months until being promoted in December to First Deputy Minister of Internal Affairs.

== Political career ==
=== Minister of Internal Affairs ===
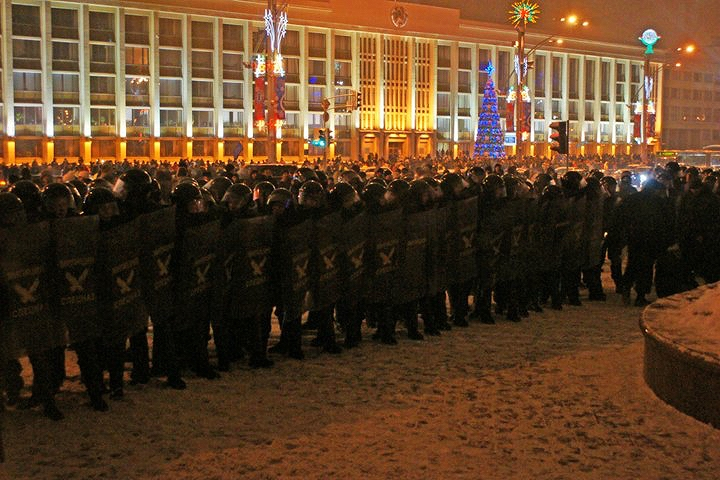
Special police forces in Minsk during the 2010 Belarusian protests.

On 6 April 2009, Kuleshov became acting head of the Ministry of Internal Affairs after Uladzimir Navumau resigned, as Kuleshov was first deputy at the time. After two months, on 2 June 2009, Lukashenko officially appointed Kuleshov as Minister of Internal Affairs to replace Navumau.

During his tenure, he led the ministry during the 2010 Belarusian protests in the aftermath of the 2010 Belarusian presidential election. During the protests, Kuleshov said that people who organised "unsanctioned meetings" could face 15 years' imprisonment, and he threatened to detain all protestors and charge them. He later confirmed in January that during the protests, he directly commanded the dispersal of protestors at Independence Square. He alleged that the protestors were part of a conspiracy aimed at a coup d'état, and he said that there were attempts made to storm the government buildings. In January 2012, victims in a court in Paris filed a case against Kuleshov for "torture and cruel and degrading treatment" in relation to the 2010 Belarusian protests, which led to calls from the victims for the French government to arrest Kuleshov. At the time, he was at a meeting with Interpol in Lyon, France, despite a European Union travel ban, although the ministry said Kuleshov could not be arrested due to diplomatic immunity.

He also led the ministry during the 2011 Minsk Metro bombing. After the bombings, Kuleshov said they had two male suspects based on testimony, although his ministry also questioned members of the Belarusian opposition over the attack. He also detained the father and older brother of one of the alleged perpetrators of the attack.

On 11 May 2012, Kuleshov was dismissed from the post by Lukashenko and placed at the disposal of the Ministry of Internal Affairs, with Igor Shunevich taking up the post to replace him. His resignation had been predicted since the summer prior due to the arrest of Kuleshov's deputy, Yevgeny Poluden, and also the dismissal of another of his top deputies, Oleg Pekarsky. He had also been tasked since 2009 by Lukashenko with carrying out "deep reform" in the ministry, but this stalled and never happened.

== Post-minister career ==
In January 2013, it was reported that Kuleshov had become an adviser to the Executive Committee of the Commonwealth of Independent States (CIS), specifically for the department against crime and terrorism. He has continued in that role since.

== Personal life ==
In May 2012, it was reported that Kuleshov was diagnosed with cancer after having earlier had serious health problems. As of 2015, Kuleshov, like many people associated with Lukashenko, lived in the elite microdistrict of Drazdy within Minsk.

== International sanctions ==
On 2 February 2011, he was included on the list of Belarusian officials sanctioned by the European Union. According to the decision of the Council, he was included on the list due to his involvement in the repression of civil society in Belarus in relation to the 2010 protests.

== Honours and awards ==
On 22 February 2011, he was granted the rank of Lieutenant general of the Militia by Lukashenko. He has also been awarded the Order "For Service to the Motherland" in the 3rd degree by the Belarusian government and the Medal "For Excellent Service in the Protection of Public Order" by the Soviet government.
