= OMON (Belarus) =

Belarus riot police

OMON/AMAP
- Russian: ОМОН Belarusian: АМАП
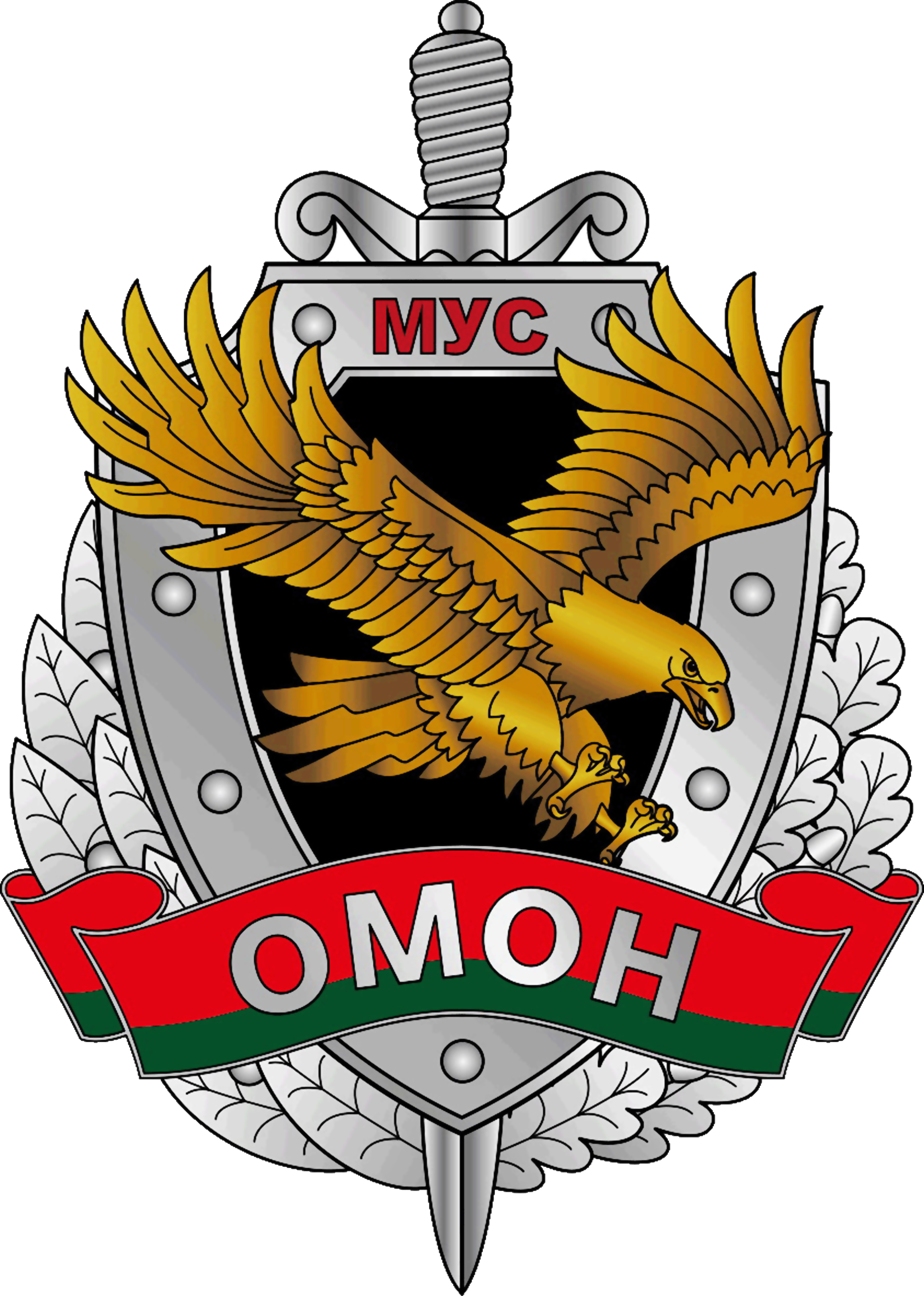
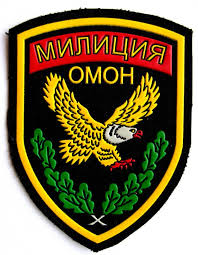
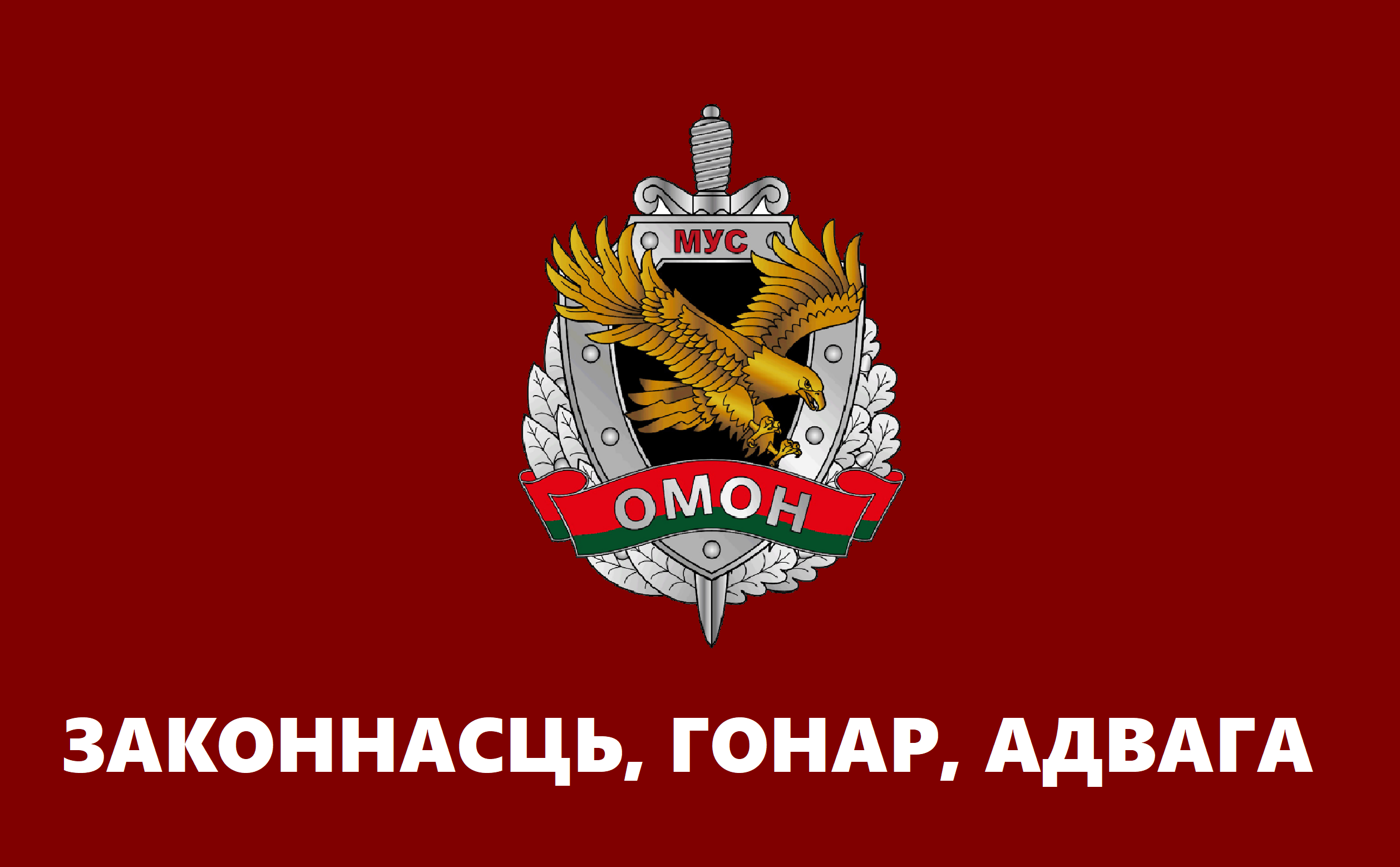
- Emblem, shoulder patch and flag of OMON (AMAP) in Belarus
- Active: 3 October 1988
- Country: Belarus
- Agency: Ministry of Internal Affairs
- Type: Riot police
- Headquarters: Minsk

Commanders
- Current commander: Viktor Krautsevich
- Notable commanders: Nikolay Karpenkov; Uladzimir Navumau

Notables
- Significant operation(s): 2010 Belarusian protests 2011 Minsk Metro bombing 2020–2021 Belarusian protests
- Anniversaries: 22 November

OMON (Russian: Отряд милиции особого назначения, romanized: Otryad militsii osobogo naznachenia, [ɐˈtrʲat mʲɪˈlʲit͡sɨ.ɪ ɐˈsobəvə nəznɐˈt͡ɕenʲɪjə], lit. 'Special Purpose Police Detachment') or AMAP (Belarusian: Атрад міліцыі асобага прызначэння, romanized: Atrad milicyji asobaha pryznačennia, [aˈtrat mʲiˈlʲit͡sɨ.i aˈsobaɣa prɨznaˈt͡ʂenʲːa]) is a riot police force under the Ministry of Internal Affairs of the Republic of Belarus (MUS) that specialized in combat and patrolling in urban areas, counter-revolutionary, covert operation, crowd control and riot control when people or prisoners who are involved in a riot, unlawful demonstration or unlawful protest, high-risk law enforcement situations, HUMINT, and internal security.

OMON is part of the MUS's Patrol Service, and is considered to be the republic's riot police. Members of OMON wear balaclavas in order to keep their identity secret and avoid reprisals by the opposition.

== History ==
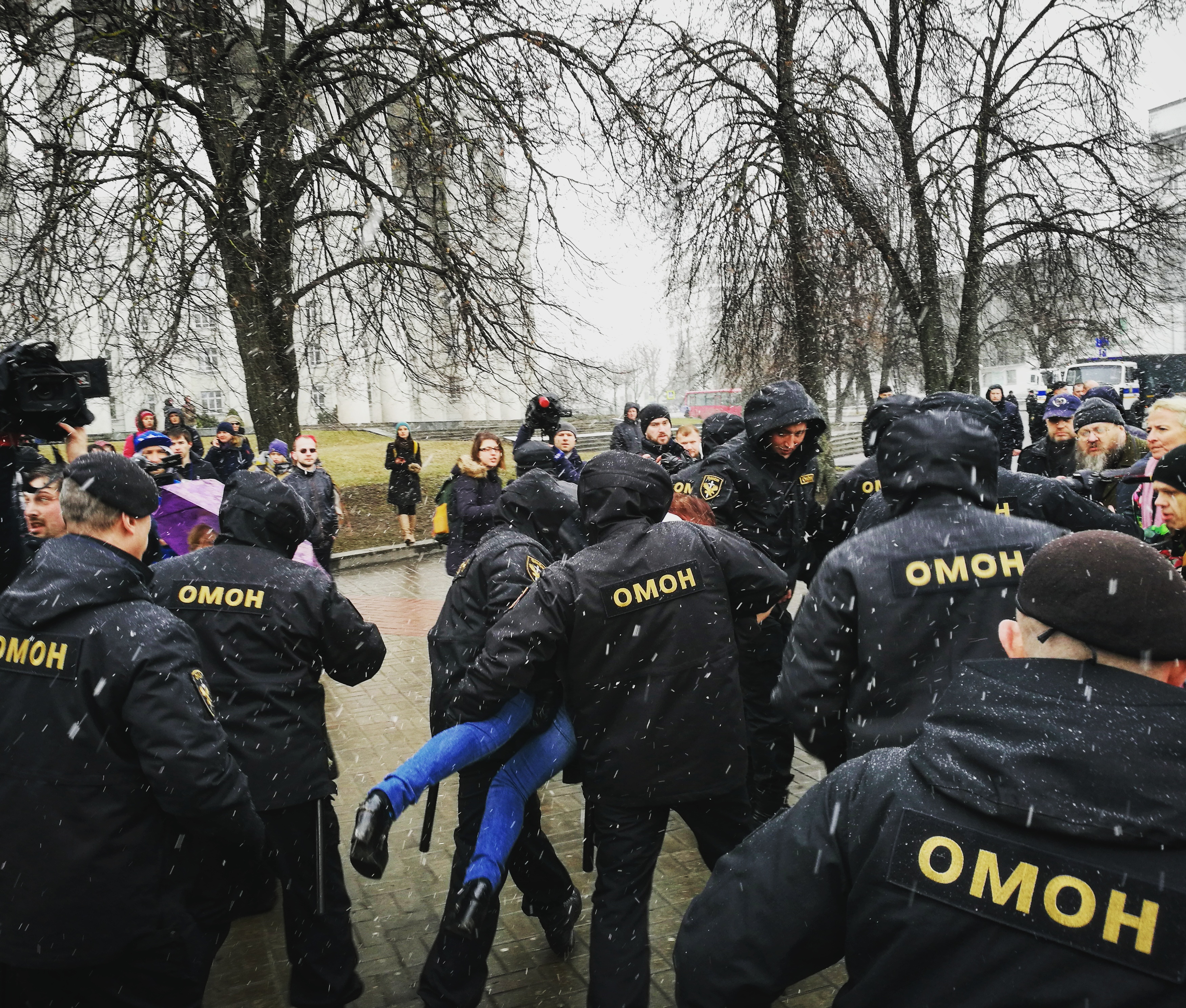
OMON servicemen during a Freedom Day rally.

On 4 October 1988, by order of the Ministry of Internal Affairs of the USSR, the first 19 special police units were created on the territory of the Soviet Union. In late November of that year, the Minsk City Executive Committee ordered the establishment of the first Minsk OMON.

After the collapse of the USSR, OMON remained under the jurisdiction of the Belarusian MUS under the subordination of the Main Internal Affairs Directorate. Colonel Vladimir Artyomov was appointed the first commander of the unit.

Subsequently, similar subdivisions were created in all regional centers of the Republic of Belarus, using the Belarusian language spelling of AMAP and the Russian language spelling of OMON.

== International sanctions ==
On October 2, 2020, the European Union added to its sanctions list Dmitry Balaba, Leonid Zhuravsky, Mikhail Domarnatsky, Maksim Mikhovich - the commanders of the Minsk, Vitebsk, Gomel and Brest OMON, respectively. The same officers were included in the sanctions lists of the United Kingdom, Canada and Switzerland.

On December 23, 2020, OMON's Minsk Special Purpose Police Unit was officially designated under the US Department of the Treasury’s Office of Foreign Assets Control (OFAC) due to being regime actors. OMON Minsk's leader Dzmitry Balaba was previously designated on October 2, 2020.

In January 2025, Canada imposed sanctions against OMON.

== Known Operations ==
On 24 March 2006, OMON stormed the opposition tent camp at October Square without provocation, violently ending the peaceful Jeans Revolution against president Alexander Lukashenko. Thousands of people were beaten and hundreds were detained, including opposition presidential candidate Alyaksandr Kazulin.

=== 2020 protests ===
OMON, along with Internal Troops of the Ministry of Internal Affairs, and the Almaz Special Anti-Terrorism Unit (SPBT Almaz) participated in the suppression of the 2020 Belarusian protests in Minsk. They utilized water cannons near the Riga Market, and rubber bullets at large gatherings. It was also reported that OMON squads commandeered ambulances and vans to deceive the protesters into allowing them through the created barricades. During the protests, the vans of the team of Siarhei Tsikhanouski was by vans filled with members of OMON.

Human Rights Watch documented several cases of ill-treatment by OMON special police forces during this period. For example, a 29-year-old journalist from Hrodna had both of his wrists broken by an OMON member. Several arrested people said they had been forced to lie on top of each other by OMON personnel. They were beaten and humiliated in the process. Seven male and two female detainees said they had been threatened with rape while being transported by OMON personnel. A 30-year-old reported that he was raped with a baton by a senior OMON officer.

At the request of Radio Free Europe/Radio Liberty in 2014 after the publication of the website of the newspaper Salidarnasts about the fact that former employees of the disbanded Ukrainian "Berkut special police force" are employed in the Belarusian OMON, the press secretary of the Ministry of Internal Affairs of the Republic of Belarus, Konstantin Shalkevich responded negatively, since "the Ministry of Internal Affairs does not comment on low-quality essays on a free topic posted on the Internet." Nevertheless, in 2020, ex-officers of the 'Berkut' unit were identified in the ranks of OMON. Novy Chas continued its journalistic investigation cycle in 2021 and identified even more such personalities.

== See also ==
- Internal Troops of Belarus
- Militsiya (Belarus)
