= Yury Karayeu =

Belarusian general and police officer

- Юрый Караеў
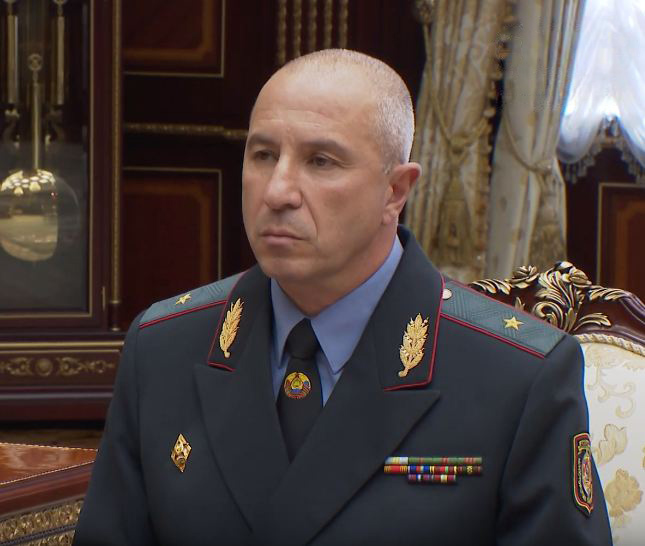

Governor of Grodno Region
- Incumbent
- Assumed office 3 March 2025
- President: Alexander Lukashenko
- Preceded by: Vladimir Karanik

Minister of Internal Affairs of Belarus
- In office 11 June 2019 – 29 October 2020
- President: Alexander Lukashenko
- Preceded by: Igor Shunevich
- Succeeded by: Ivan Kubrakov

Personal details
- Born: Yury Khadzhimuratavich Karayeu; 21 June 1966 (age 60) Ordzhonikidze, North Ossetia, Soviet Union
- Education: Saratov Higher Military Command School (1987); Frunze Military Academy (1996); Military Academy of Belarus
- Profession: Police
- Awards: Order For Service to the Homeland, 3rd Class (2005)

Military service
- Allegiance: USSR; Belarus
- Branch/service: Internal Troops of the Soviet Union; Internal Troops of Belarus

Yury Khadzhimuratavich Karayeu (Belarusian: Юрый Хаджымуратавіч Кара́еў, Russian: Ю́рий Хаджимура́тович Кара́ев, Yuriy Karayev, born 21 June 1966) is a Russian-born Belarusian General of Militsiya and the current governor of the Grodno region since 2025. He was the Minister of Internal Affairs of the Republic of Belarus from 11 June 2019 to 29 October 2020. He is also a Major General of the Police.

== Biography ==
Karayeu was born on 21 June 1966 in the capital of North Ossetia, Ordzhonikidze (now Vladikavkaz). He graduated from the Saratov Military Institute of the Interior Troops of the Ministry of Internal Affairs of the Soviet Union in 1987 and was sent to serve in Mahiliou, Belarus, then part of the USSR. He was later transferred to an operational regiment stationed in Minsk and spent several months serving in the Southern Caucasus during the First Nagorno-Karabakh War.

In 1996 or 1997, he graduated from the Frunze Military Academy in Moscow, Russia.

In 1999-2009 he served as commander of various police and internal troops units in Babruysk, Homiel and Minsk.

In 2009, Karayeu was appointed First Deputy Chief of Operational and Combat Training of Internal Troops at the Ministry of Internal Affairs. From 2012 to 11 June 2019 he was the Deputy Minister of Internal Affairs of the Republic of Belarus and commander of the Internal Troops of Belarus.

On 11 June 2019 he was appointed Minister of Internal Affairs of the Republic of Belarus by President Alexander Lukashenko.

=== The protests of 2020 and aftermath ===
Yury Karayeu has been one of the central figures of the 2020 Belarusian protests following the disputed 2020 Belarusian presidential election. On the 4th day of protests after the presidential elections, Karayeu confirmed that the Ministry of Internal Affairs officers were allowed to use force against the protestors. On 29 August, the Coordination Council of the Belarusian democratic opposition called for Karayeu's resignation following his responsibility for police brutality during the protests on the first days after the election. Minister of Internal Affairs of the Republic of Belarus (11 June 2019 - 29 October 2020), Police Lieutenant General. Head of punitive operations against civilians during the 2020 protests. Responsible for the concealment of the election results in August 2020, who gave orders for the violent dispersal of peaceful rallies and the use of rubber bullets, firearms, flash grenades and water cannons against unarmed protesters, as well as for violence and torture in the Belarusian security forces and prisons.

On 31 August 2020 Karayeu was included in the list of persons who were banned indefinitely from entering Latvia, as well as received a five-year ban on entry into Estonia and a ban on entry into Lithuania due to the fact that by his actions he organized and supported the "falsification of the presidential elections on August 9" and subsequent violent suppression of peaceful protests.

On 2 October 2020, Karayeu was banned from entering the European Union and put on the Specially Designated Nationals and Blocked Persons List by the United States Department of the Treasury. He was also sanctioned by the United Kingdom, Switzerland, and Canada.

On 29 October 2020 Karayeu, by presidential decree, was removed from office. On the same day he was appointed Assistant to the President of the Republic of Belarus - Inspector for the Grodno Region.

On 4 March 2021 the BYPOL initiative published an audio recording of Karaev's alleged address to the staff of the Chief Organized Crime and Corruption Fighting Directorate (Russian: Главное управление по борьбе с организованной преступностью и коррупцией, GUBOPiK) in autumn 2020. In the transcript of the speech, the then Minister of Internal Affairs makes insults towards Belarusians and also instructs the employees of the GUBOPiK regarding the ways and methods of extrajudicial reprisals against people.

On 19 March 2021 it was reported by the Russian news agency TASS that Alexander Lukashenko has named Karayeu and Health Minister Vladimir Karanik as his preferred choices for succeeding him as President of Belarus in the event Lukashenko leaves office.

In March 2025, Karayeu was appointed governor of the Grodno region.

== Family ==
Yury Karayeu is married and has a son.

== See also ==
- 6th Separate Special-Police Brigade
