= Igor Shunevich =

Belarusian politician and policeman (born 1967)

Igor Anatolievich Shunevich
- Игорь Анатольевич Шуневич; Ігар Анатолевіч Шуневіч
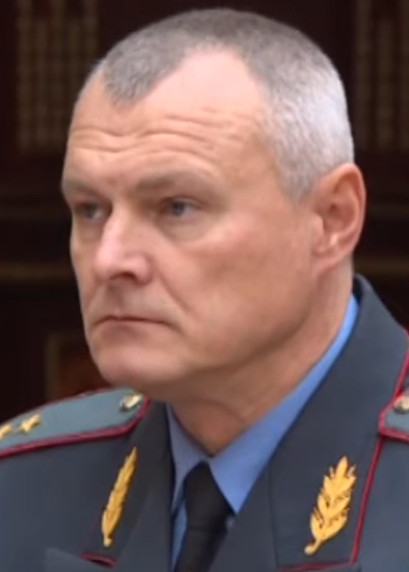
- Shunevich in 2018

Minister of Internal Affairs
- In office 11 May 2012 – 10 June 2019
- President: Alexander Lukashenko
- Prime Minister: Mikhail Myasnikovich; Andrei Kobyakov; Syarhey Rumas
- Preceded by: Anatoly Kuleshov
- Succeeded by: Yury Karayeu

Personal details
- Born: 27 March 1967 (age 59) Luhansk Oblast, Ukrainian SSR, Soviet Union (now Ukraine)
- Education: Minsk Higher School of the Soviet Ministry of Internal Affairs
- Occupation: Politician; Policeman
- Military career
- Rank: Lieutenant general

Igor Anatolievich Shunevich (also transliterated as Ihar Shunevich; born 27 March 1967) is a Ukrainian-born Belarusian politician and policeman. He most notably served as Minister of Internal Affairs from 2012 until 2019.

Born in the Luhansk Oblast, Shunevich moved to Belarus to attend the Minsk Higher School of the Soviet Ministry of Internal Affairs, where he graduated in 1992. Afterward, he rose through the ranks of the Ministry of Internal Affairs until 2007, when he transferred to the KGB. In the KGB he headed a variety of departments until 2012 when he was transferred back to the ministry under Viktor Lukashenko, who he was generally considered a protégé of. On 11 May 2012 he was appointed Minister of Internal Affairs, a position he held until 10 June 2019.

During his tenure, he was praised for his attempts to combat corruption and enforcement of harsher anti-drug laws. However, his remarks were often strongly condemned, as he made repeated homophobic statements that drew outrage, approved of raids against the Romani community following the death of a police officer, and praised the NKVD by saying that people should remember their officer's service. He was repeatedly described as one of the few politicians who were openly criticized, with his ministry reaching the lowest trust rating out of any ministry during his tenure. (Note: Sources:)

After his resignation as minister, he worked for HC Dinamo Minsk until 2021 when he was appointed Chairman of the Belarusian Society of Hunters and Fishermen.

== Early life ==
Shunevich was born on 27 March 1967 in Luhansk Oblast in the Ukrainian SSR. After attending school in Ukraine, in 1992 he graduated from the Minsk Higher School of the Soviet Ministry of Internal Affairs.

After graduating, he steadily rose through the ranks of the Ministry of Internal Affairs. He was first appointed as an investigator of the ministry in Minsk. Shunevich eventually reached the rank of Deputy Head of the Department of Internal Affairs in Minsk before he was transferred to the KGB.

In 2007, he was transferred to the KGB to be the Head of the Investigation Department. Afterward, he headed a variety of departments in the KGB including the Main Directorate for Counterintelligence Support of Law Enforcement and Regulatory Bodies and the Fight against Corruption and Organized Crime. In this role, in 2010-11 when Natalya Radina was imprisoned, Radina accused him of interrogating her. She stated that in mid-January 2011 he came in without giving her the representation of a lawyer, and said that her work was in the interest of the KGB. She also accused him of being at the trial of Alexander Otroschenkov.

In January 2012, Shunevich was transferred to the Ministry of Internal Affairs from the KGB on the recommendation of Viktor Lukashenko - who he was generally considered a protégé of - after Oleg Pekarsky was dismissed on offenses of discrediting the title.

== Political career ==
=== Minister of Internal Affairs ===
He was officially appointed Minister of Internal Affairs by Alexander Lukashenko on 11 May 2012. Starting in late 2018, Lukashenko warned Shunevich multiple times that the work of law enforcement agencies would need to come under serious analysis and that he had not followed through with monitoring the restoration of farms.

At 11:15 a.m. on 10 June 2019, a message appeared on the BelTA website that said Lukashenko was receiving Shunevich for help with the 2nd European Games, and then at 2:22 p.m. it was said that Shunevich had submitted his resignation. Various theories circulated for the reason for his resignation, including for health reasons like his predecessor or that he was too much of a possible successor to Lukashenko, but Shunevich said that he needed to try something different due to the length he spent in the post.

==== Tenure ====
===== NKVD =====
During the 9 May victory parade in 2015, Shunevich wore a uniform of the NKVD, which drew heavy criticism as glorifying the secret police that executed millions during the Great Purge and perpetrated the Katyn massacre. Svetlana Alexievich, the winner of the 2015 Nobel Prize in Literature, also criticized him, saying he had not read Solzhenitsyn or Shalamov and called it an absolute degradation of society. He explained his decision as honoring the feats of people who died in the uniform. He later repeated wearing the uniform in the Victory Day parade in 2018.

In 2017, when activists blocked the construction on the site of the Kurapaty forest where NKVD executed thousands of people, he responded by saying people should remember the NKVD officers who died during their service.

===== Corruption =====
Shunevich attempted to combat corruption, particularly with law enforcement. He has stated that 123 criminal cases were initiated against police officers, and that he had started to conduct raids on police officers and that the ministry had started identifying officers who had violated professional discipline. After 270 thousand dollars was stolen by a police officer from GUBOPiK, he said they were looking into it, although the man left to Romania.

===== Alcohol =====
Shunevich advocated for restrictions on the sale of alcohol in the morning, which he said reduced the crime rate, which was briefly passed before being repealed a day later in 2018. Shunevich also stated in 2016 in an official post that law enforcement officers would work on limiting the availability of alcohol, particularly through the internet.

===== Abuse =====
The ministry also developed a bill countering domestic violence, proposing measures to prevent it. He also proposed an official ban on child abuse, which was soundly rejected with Lukashenko also speaking out against it. Shunevich ordered doctors to inform the ministry about the sexual lives of schoolgirls under 16 to identify crimes against sexual inviolability.

===== Drugs =====
In 2014, a law was passed giving the state a monopoly on the trade of poppy seeds, from which opium can be obtained, and a liability was issued. In response, the ministry under Shuneivch initiated a law that increased responsibility for the circulation of narcotics, psychotropics, increasing the maximum term of imprisonment for sale of drugs to 25 years and reducing the age of responsibility to 14 with Shunevich saying it stopped people dying and slaughtering. Article 328 of the Criminal Code later changed this law, lowering the terms of imprisonment and the fines after people went on a hunger strike to soften the law. Shunevich later stated that he would not rule out decriminalization of crimes under the milder part of Article 328 if people were previously sanctioned for it.

===== Roma =====
On 16 May 2019, a notable incident occurred where police smashed the houses of people from the Roma community and took them into interrogation after the death of a police officer in Mahiliou which was reported to be caused by three people of Roma appearance. Although on 20 May the Investigate Committee said it was a suicide, Shunevich responded on 23 May that the raids on the Roma were justified because of the circumstances and the serious crime. To apologize for his comments, Natalya Kochanova visited those affected.

===== LGBT =====
When the British Embassy in Minsk hoisted an LGBT flag in 2018, Shunevich commented on 22 May that it was "propaganda of a lifestyle that is unacceptable for us" on Belarus 1 channel. He also accused the UK of creating problems where they do not exist. The flag was hung on 17 May on the International Day Against Homophobia, Biphobia and Transphobia with British Ambassador Fionna Gibb commenting that it promotes and draws public attention to the discrimination against LGBT people. Igor Hubarevich, a senior analyst of the Ostrogorski Center, said the case was inappropriate since foreign missions falls under the Ministry of Foreign Affairs and not internal, and that the Foreign Ministry had refrained from commenting indicating there was no violation of law.

His comments in May 2018 prompted pride parades in the United States and Canada to ridicule him. A petition was also created calling for the removal of the statement "We are for the real thing!" be removed. The Humans Right Center in Minsk also responded with a petition for a criminal investigation into Shunevich for inciting hatred against LGBT people and violating Article 130, but the case was dismissed by the Prosecutor General's Office by Marina Popova who said it was his personal opinion. In June he was asked what the "they will not pass" comment meant from the May 2018 statements made by the Ministry of Internal Affairs, to which Shunevich commented they will not pass anywhere and called the Ministry's response correct and diplomatic and said that mass detentions of LGBT people were not brutal. He also stated that protecting morality was a function of the Ministry, which is why they commented on it, which is considered a broad interpretation of the ministry's powers. Later in December, he called LGBT people "leaky", a word used in prison slang to insult the community, and also dyryavyye (holers).

== Post-minister career ==
From 15 May 2014 to 2020 Shunevich headed the supervisory board of HC Dinamo Minsk. In addition, during his tenure as supervisor, he was on the board of director of the Kontinental Hockey League (KHL). Afterwards, he was General Director of Dinamo Minsk after replacing Dmitry Baskov until May 2021.

On 20 October 2021, he was officially appointed Chairman of the Belarusian Society of Hunters and Fishermen.

In June 2022 it was reported that Lukashenko had met with Shunevich and ordered him to provide five thousand men for the people's militia from the society.

== Personal life ==
Shunevich initially resided in a two-room apartment in a police house at Hrushevka Street in Minsk. However, he now lives in a house at Drazdy, where the majority of Lukashenko's allies live, of about 295 square meters. He has a wife and a young daughter. Shunevich said in an interview that he enjoys reading Pavlo Tychyna and Adam Mickiewicz, but that he does not read modern literature.

On 8 February 2020, it was reported on Telegram that Shunevich was in detention on house arrest for a corruption scheme for sugar supplies. It was also stated he was close to the people involved in the case, including the detained KGB deputy head of the GUBAZiK, Uladzimir Tsikhinya. A few days later it was declared that he was not a suspect in the sugar case.

== Honours and awards ==
- Order of the Fatherland, III degree (11 January 2014)
- Lieutenant General of the Police (7 May 2015)
- Honorary diploma of the National Assembly of Belarus (31 May 2017)
