= 6th Separate Special-Police Brigade =

- Belarusian: 6-я асобная спецыяльная міліцэйская брыгада Russian: 6-я отдельная специальная милицейская бригада
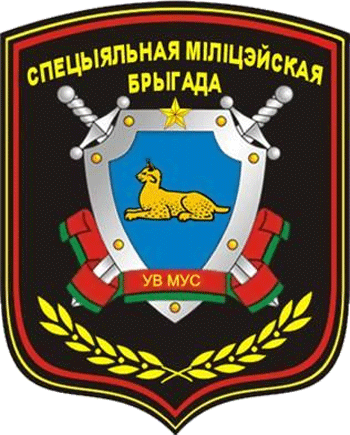
- Shoulder patch of the unit
- Active: 18 January 1990
- Country: USSR (1990-1991); Belarus (1991-present)
- Branch: Internal Troops of the Soviet Union; Internal Troops of Belarus
- Type: Gendarmerie
- Headquarters: Gomel, Mazyr
- Nickname: Military Unit 5525
- Patron: Tryphon, Respicius, and Nympha

Commanders
- Brigade Commander: Colonel Viktor Zhadobin
- Notable commanders: Yury Karayeu

The 6th Separate Special-Police Brigade of the Internal Troops of Belarus (Belarusian: 6-я асобная спецыяльная міліцэйская брыгада ўнутраных войскаў Міністэрства ўнутраных спраў Рэспублікі Беларусь, romanized: 6-ja asobnaja śpiecyjaĺnaja milicejskaja bryhada ŭnutranych vojskaŭ Ministerstva ŭnutranych spraŭ Respubliki Bielaruś; Russian: 6-я отдельная специальная милицейская бригада внутренних войск Министерства внутренних дел Республики Беларусь), officially known as Military Unit 5525, is a special police formation of the Internal Troops of Belarus under Ministry of Internal Affairs. Its forces are deployed in four cities of the Gomel Oblast: Gomel, Mazyr, Rechytsa and Svietlahorsk.

By 2015, the unit carried out almost the entire range of tasks assigned to the Internal Troops; it was staffed by 2/3 with contract servicemen, warrant officers and officers.

== History ==
=== 145th Separate Special Motorized Militia Battalion (1990-1992) ===
Military Unit 5525 was formed by on 18 January 1990. The military unit was formed as the 145th Separate Special Motorized Militia Battalion of the 43rd Red Banner Convoy Division of the Internal Troops. Since the beginning of its formation, the military unit has been deployed at the location of a battalion of the patrol-post police service of the Internal Affairs Directorate of the Gomel Regional Executive Committee. The personnel of the unit were relocated to a new place of permanent deployment on the territory of the former Orlyonok Pioneer Camp only in February 1992. On 27 February 1991, the military unit carried out the tasks of protecting public order in connection with the arrival in Gomel of Soviet President Mikhail Gorbachev. From 17 June to 25 September 1991, the personnel of the unit enforced public order in the city of Stepanakert of the Nagorno-Karabakh Autonomous Region of the Azerbaijan SSR and ensured the security of a peacekeeping mission of the Russian Presidents Boris Yeltsin and Kazakh leader Nursultan Nazarbayev.

In 1991, the military unit began to independently carry out service in the Soviet railway districts of Gomel. Before the official dissolution of the USSR, the 43rd Convoy Division was transferred to the subordination of the Belarusian MVD, with the military units stationed on the territory of the RSFSR being were withdrawn from the division.

=== 1992-2004 ===
By the resolution of the Council of Ministers on 24 March 1992 the 43rd Division of the Internal Troops was transformed. That May, it was officially renamed to the 3rd Separate Special Motorized Police Battalion. In July 1995, the unit was redeployed to a new location, the military townlet of Leshchinets in the city of Gomel, On 7 May 1998, at the Palace of Independence in Minsk, the unit was presented with the Combat Banner and the Diploma of the President of Belarus. A day later in Gomel, the solemn meeting the combat banner took place, and on 12 May, a solemn event was held dedicated to the dismissal of the unit's personnel to the reserve.

In 2001, engineering units in the military unit were reduced, and their property and equipment were transferred to the Ministry of Emergencies. In November 2001, the military band of the unit was created.

=== Since 2004 ===
On 21 January 2004, the 6th Special Police Brigade was formed on the basis of the 3rd Special Police Battalion. Colonel Alexander Stelmashok was appointed the brigade commander.

== Structure (since 2001) ==
- Directorate
- 1st Patrol Battalion
  - 1st Patrol Company
    - 1st Platoon (Military intelligence and Special forces)
  - 2nd Patrol Company
  - 3rd Patrol Company
- 2nd Independent Patrol Battalion
  - 4th Independent Patrol Company
  - 5th Independent Patrol Company
  - 6th Independent Patrol Company
- 3rd Independent Rifle Battalion
  - 7th Rifle Company
    - Group of Specialists in Cynology
  - 8th Independent Rifle Company
  - 9th Independent Rifle Company
  - 10th Rifle Company
- Logistics Company
- Technical Support Company
- Training Company
- Cynological Service
- Minesweeper Group
- Military band
- Medical Station
- 3 Shooting Ranges

== Commanders ==
Commanders since 1992:

- Major Nikolai Velikanov (1990–1992)
- Major Valery Lapchenko (1992–1995)
- Colonel Alexander Kartynnik (1995–1996)
- Colonel Alexander Stelmashok (1996–2005)
- Colonel Yuri Karaev (2005–2008)
- Colonel Igor Burmistrov (2008)
- Lieutenant Colonel Vladislav Mandrik (2008–2010)
- Lieutenant Colonel Sergei Grebennikov (2010–2013)
- Colonel Ruslan Shestopalov (2013–2017)
- Colonel Andrey Smirnov (2017–2019)
- Colonel Viktor Zhadobin (since 2019)

== See also ==
- Minsk City Police Department
- 3rd Separate Special-Purpose Brigade
- Separate Operational Purpose Division
