= Ivan Kubrakov =

Minister of Internal Affairs of Belarus

- Іван Кубракоў; Иван Кубраков
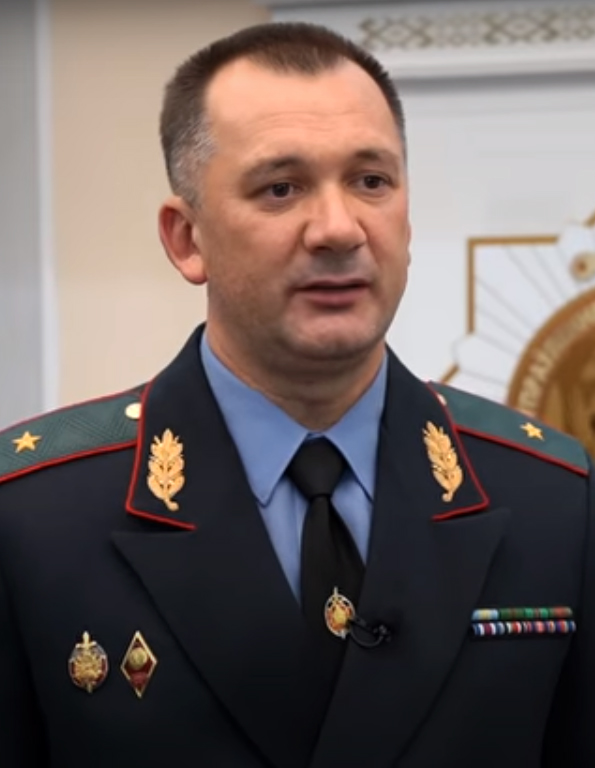
- Kubrakov in 2020

Minister of Internal Affairs
- Incumbent
- Assumed office 29 October 2020
- President: Alexander Lukashenko
- Preceded by: Yury Karayeu

Personal details
- Born: 5 May 1975 (age 51) Malinovka, Byelorussian SSR, Soviet Union
- Education: Ministry of the Interior Academy of the Republic of Belarus

Ivan Vladimirovich Kubrakov (Belarusian: Іван Уладзіміравіч Кубракоў, romanized: Ivan Uladzimiravič Kubrakoŭ, Russian: Иван Владимирович Кубраков; born 5 May 1975) is a Belarusian politician who has been the Minister of Internal Affairs of the Republic of Belarus since 29 October 2020.

== Early life ==
He was born on 5 May 1975 in Malinovka, Kastsyukovichy District, Mogilev Region. Graduated from the Minsk Special Secondary School of the Ministry of Internal Affairs and the Ministry of the Interior Academy of the Republic of Belarus.

== Career ==
He has served in the internal organs since 1995. He worked as a district, senior district inspector of the department for the protection of law and order and prevention of the Internal Affairs Directorate of the Central District, Minsk, the head of the Internal Affairs Directorate of the Central District, Minsk. He headed the Zaslavsky department of the Minsk police department.

Served in the Main Directorate of Law Enforcement and Prevention of the Public Security Police of the Ministry of Internal Affairs of the Republic of Belarus. Since 12 May 2017 – Head of the Main Department of Internal Affairs of the Vitebsk Regional Executive Committee. On 29 June 2018, he was awarded the special rank of Major General of Militia.

From 28 March 2019 to 29 October 2020 – Head of the Main Department of Internal Affairs of the Minsk City Executive Committee.

On 29 October 2020, by the decree of the President of the Republic of Belarus Alexander Lukashenko was appointed Minister of Internal Affairs of the Republic of Belarus.

=== 2020 Belarus protests and beyond ===
On 31 August 2020, against Kubrakov and another 29 Belarusian politicians were introduced personal sanctions by Latvia, Lithuania, and Estonia due to the fact that they "organized and supported the falsification of the presidential elections in Belarus, and supported the violent suppression of peaceful protests".

On October 2, 2020, the U.S. Treasury added Kubrakov to its Specially Designated Nationals and Blocked Persons List. On the same day, he was banned from entering the European Union. Kubrakov was also sanctioned by the United Kingdom, Switzerland, and Canada.

In 2022, Kubrakov was blacklisted by Japan and Ukraine.

== Family ==
Married, has two kids.

- Son – Vladimir, policeman.
- Daughter – Elizaveta, schoolgirl.
