= Uladzimir Navumau =

Belarusian politician

- Владимир Владимирович Наумов

Minister of Internal Affairs of Belarus
- In office 25 September 2000 – 4 April 2009
- Leader: Alexander Lukashenko
- Preceded by: Yuri Sivakov
- Succeeded by: Anatoly Kuleshov

Head of the Presidential Security Service of Belarus
- In office 20 January 1999 – 25 September 2000
- Leader: Alexander Lukashenko
- Preceded by: Vladimir Kuzhanov (acting)
- Succeeded by: Leonid Yerin

Personal details
- Born: Vladimir Vladimirovich Naumov; February 7, 1956 (age 70) Smolensk, Soviet Union
- Education: School of the Ministry of the Interior of the USSR
- Profession: Police

Military service
- Allegiance: USSR
- Years of service: 1974–1976

Uladzimir Navumau (Belarusian: Уладзімір Навумаў, Russian: Владимир Наумов, Vladimir Naumov, also Uladzimir Naumau; born 7 February 1956) is a Belarusian politician accused of human rights violations.

He was Minister of the Internal Affairs of Belarus (2000–2009) and chairman of Belarus Ice Hockey Federation.

Navumau has been accused of violent crackdown of opposition protests following the Belarusian presidential election in 2006 and of being related to the disappearances of opposition leaders in 1999–2000.

== Biography ==
Navumau has been working in the Minsk Militsiya since 1976.

Between 1991 and 1999 he was commander of Berkut and Almaz special units (OMON) of the Ministry of Internal Affairs of Belarus. The OMON participated in the crackdown of protests before and after the controversial 1996 referendum.

Between 1999 and 2000 Navumau was Head of the Presidential Security Service.

From 2000 to 2009 he was Minister of Internal Affairs of Belarus. During his service in this position, the police and OMON forces dispersed protests related to the controversial presidential election of 2001, referendum of 2004 and presidential election in 2006.

== Sanctions and accusations ==
Navumau has been included into the sanctions lists of the United States, the European Union (see below for details), the United Kingdom and Switzerland.

According to a decision by the European Union, Navumau "failed to take action to investigate the case of the unresolved disappearances of Yuri Zakharenko, Viktor Gonchar, Anatoly Krasovski and Dmitri Zavadski in Belarus in 1999–2000 (...) As a Minister of Interior he was responsible for the repression over peaceful demonstrations until his retirement on 6 April 2009 for health reasons".

According to two journalistic investigations, Navumau owns 75% of the Moscow-registered company Zorka Food, which trades grain in occupied Mariupol and exports it through Belarus.
