= Alexander Barsukov (Russian politician) =

Russian politician (1955–2026)

- Александр Барсуков

Member of the Legislative Assembly of the Republic of Karelia
- In office 8 October 2006 – 8 October 2011
- In office 26 April 1998 – 26 April 2002

Personal details
- Born: 30 April 1955 Petrozavodsk, Karelo-Finnish SSR, USSR
- Died: 14 July 2026 (aged 71) Republic of Karelia, Russia
- Party: Liberal Democratic Party of Russia
- Education: Petrozavodsk State University
- Profession: Politician

Alexander Mikhailovich Barsukov (Russian: Александр Михайлович Барсуков; 30 April 1955 – 14 July 2026) was a Russian politician who was a member of the Legislative Assembly of the Republic of Karelia (1998–2002, 2006–2011).

Barsukov died on 14 July 2026, at the age of 71.
