= Alexander Barsukov (Belarusian politician) =

Belarusian politician (born 1965)

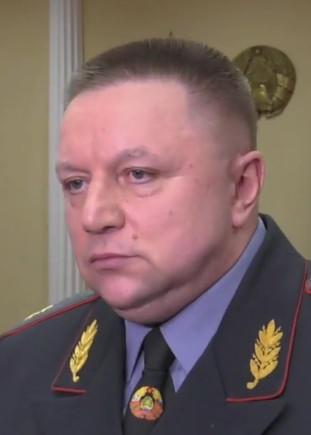
- Barsukov in 2020

Member of the House of Representatives
- Incumbent
- Assumed office 22 March 2024
- Constituency: Yugo-Zapadny

Personal details
- Born: 29 April 1965 (age 61)

Alexander Petrovich Barsukov (Russian: Александр Петрович Барсуков; born 29 April 1965) is a Belarusian politician serving as a member of the House of Representatives since 2024. From 2017 to 2020, he served as deputy minister of internal affairs.
