= Ministry of Internal Affairs (Belarus) =

Government ministry of Belarus

Ministry of Internal Affairs of the Republic of Belarus
- Міністэрства ўнутраных спраў Рэспублікі Беларусь; Ministerstva wnutranykh spraw Respubliki Bielaruś
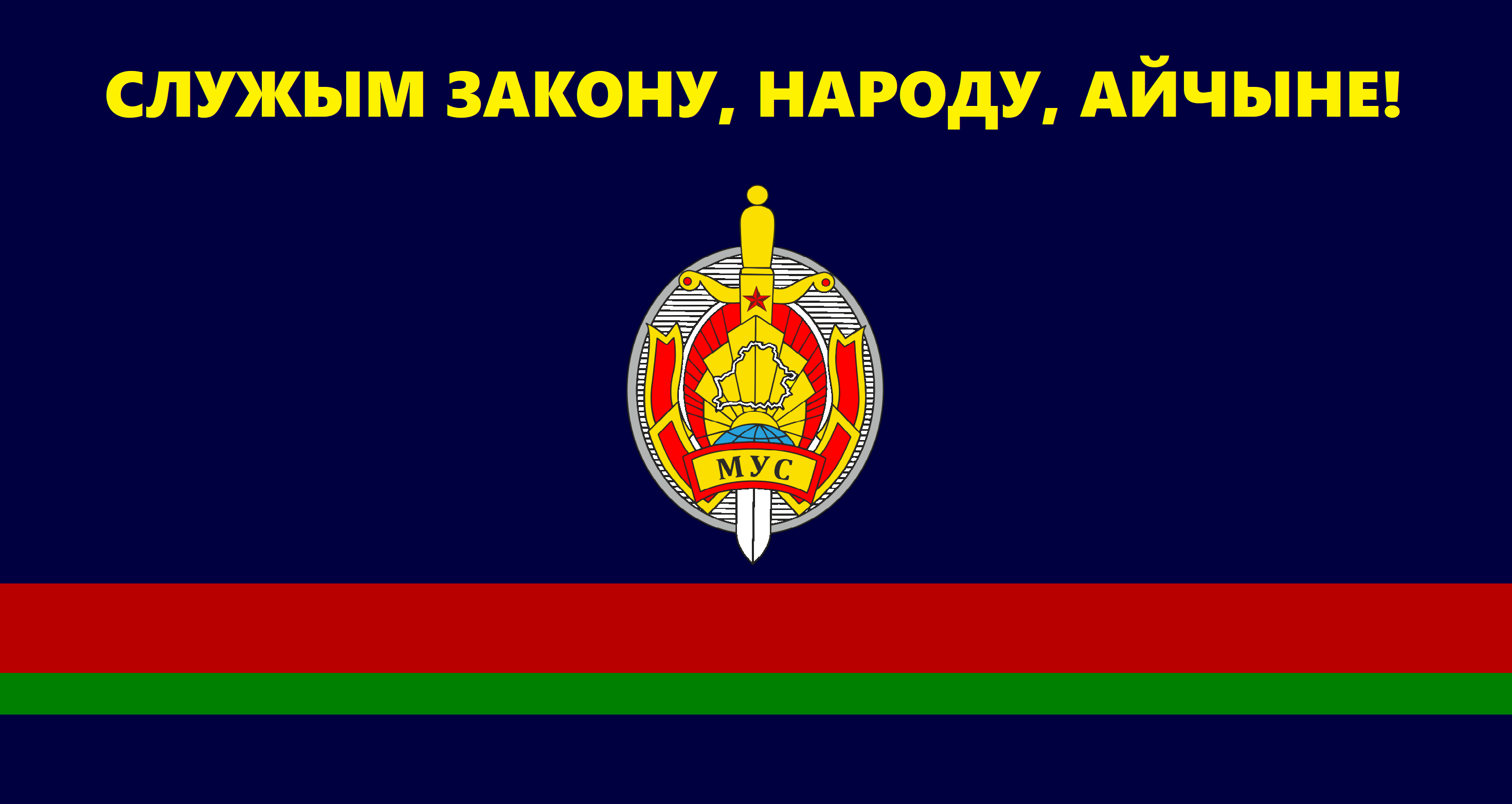
- Emblem and flag of the Ministry of Internal Affairs of Belarus

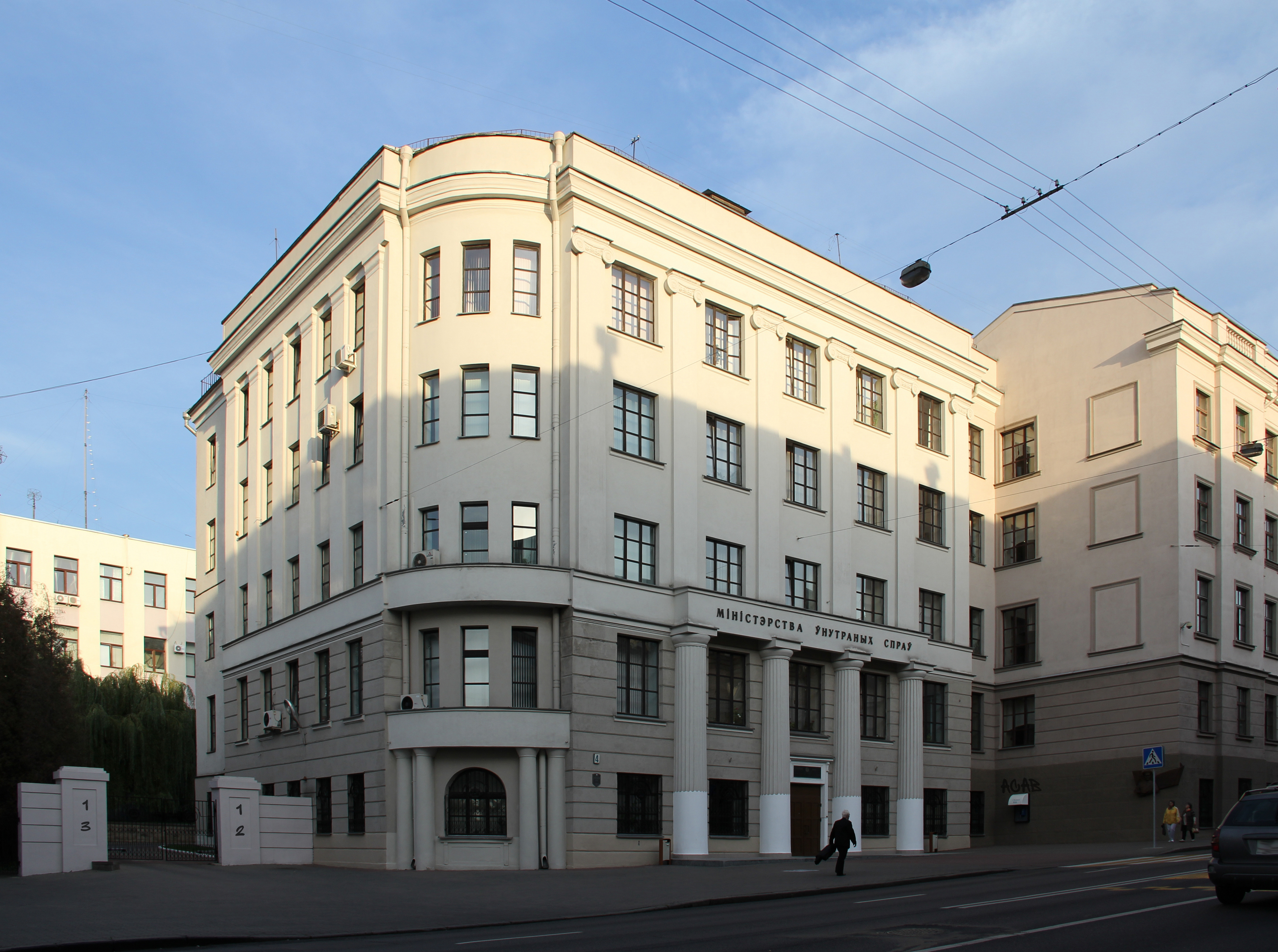
- Headquarters of the Ministry of Internal Affairs of the Republic of Belarus

Interior Ministry overview
- Formed: February 22, 1991
- Preceding Interior Ministry: Ministry of Internal Affairs of the Belarusian SSR
- Jurisdiction: Government of Belarus
- Headquarters: 15 Kirova St., Minsk, 220030; 53.8990727°N 27.5528741°E
- Minister responsible: Ivan Kubrakov, Minister of Internal Affairs
- Child agencies: Militsiya; Presidential Guard; Internal Troops
- Key document: Decree by the President of Belarus "On issues of the Ministry of Internal Affairs and organizations included in the system of internal affairs bodies"
- Website: mvd.gov.by

The Ministry of Internal Affairs of Belarus (Belarusian: Міністэрства ўнутраных спраў Рэспублікі Беларусь, romanized: Ministerstva ŭnutranych spraŭ Respubliki Bielaruś; Russian: Министерство внутренних дел Республики Беларусь, romanized: Ministerstvo vnutrennikh del Respubliki Belarus'), abbreviated МUS (МУС) in Belarusian and MVD (МВД) in Russian, is a body of the Belarusian Government that is charged with the internal affairs of Belarus. Day to day law enforcement is carried out by the Militsiya. The Ministry is also tasked with providing security to state buildings and officials. Organizations such as the Presidential Guard are under the control of the Ministry. The clearing of landmines is among the tasks of the ministry.

== History ==
The MVD/MUS has previously operated under the following names:

- NKVD of the Belarusian SSR (1933–1946)
- Ministry of Security of the Belarusian SSR (1946–1962)
- Ministry of Internal Affairs of the Belarusian SSR (1962–1991)
- Ministry of Internal Affairs of the Republic of Belarus (1991–present)

=== Role in political repressions ===
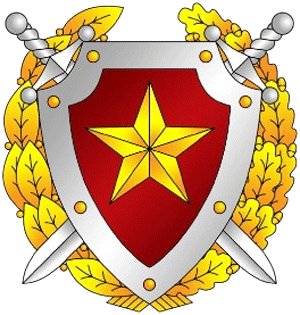
Emblem of the Internal Troops.

According to human rights groups, the United States, and the European Union, the Ministry of Internal Affairs and its senior leadership play a key role in human rights violations and political repressions in Belarus.

A number of former Ministers and senior officials of the Ministry of Internal Affairs, including commanders and officers of the police (Militsiya) and of special police units operated by the Ministry (OMON, Almaz) have been included in the sanctions lists of the European Union and the United States.

Several former officers of the Ministry of Internal Affairs are being accused of involvement in unresolved disappearances and allegedly murder of opposition leaders Yuri Zakharenko (also former Minister of Internal Affairs himself) and Viktor Gonchar, opposition sponsor Anatoly Krasovski, and journalist Dmitri Zavadski in 1999–2000.

=== Sanctioned officials of the Ministry of Internal Affairs of Belarus ===
| Name | Position | Accusations | Remarks |
|---|---|---|---|
| Yury Sivakov | Former Minister of Internal Affairs and former Deputy Head of the Presidential Administration | Remained on the sanctions list of the EU after 2016. Is sanctioned by the United States. | |
| Anatoly Kuleshov | Former Minister of Internal Affairs | Commanded the troops of the Ministry of Internal Affairs that brutally dispersed the protests following the presidential elections of 2010 and "showed some pride for this responsibility" | |
| Uladzimir Navumau | Former Minister of Interior and also former Head of the President's Security Service. | Failed to take action to investigate the case of the unresolved disappearances of Yuri Zakharenko, Viktor Gonchar, Anatoly Krasovski and Dmitri Zavadski in Belarus in 1999-2000 | First included in EU sanctions list after the controversial presidential election of 2006. Remains on the sanctions list of the EU after 2016. Is sanctioned by the United States. |
| Yury Podobed | Former Head of the Unit for Special Purposes at the Ministry of Internal Affairs, later Head of the security service of the holding company Triple of businessman Yuri Chizh | Commanded internal anti-riot troops during the violent repression of peaceful protests, including those in 2004 and 2008 | First included in EU sanctions list after the controversial presidential election of 2006. Is sanctioned by the United States. |
| Dmitri Pavlichenko | Former Head of the Special Response Group at the Ministry of Interior (SOBR) | Key person in the unresolved disappearances of opposition leaders Yuri Zakharenko, Viktor Gonchar, opposition sponsor Anatoly Krasovski, and journalist Dmitri Zavadski in Belarus in 1999-2000 | First included in EU sanctions list after the controversial presidential election of 2006. Remains on EU sanctions list after 2016. Is also sanctioned by the United States. |
| Leonid Farmagey | Deputy Head of the Academy of the Ministry of Internal Affairs. Before June 2011 – Police Commander of the City of Minsk | Commanded the Minsk police forces that brutally repressed the protests of 19 December 2010. | |
| Valery Gaidukevich | Deputy Minister of Internal Affairs. Commander of internal troops, and Member of Parliament in the Lower Chamber | As a commander of internal troops, he was responsible for the violent repression of the demonstration on 19 December 2010 in Minsk, where his troops were the first to be actively involved. | |
| Sergey Gureev | Former Deputy Minister of Internal Affairs and Head of Preliminary Investigation | Has been actively involved in the repression of civil society in Belarus. As a former Deputy Minister of Interior and Head of Preliminary Investigation, he was responsible for the violent suppression of protests and violations of human rights during investigation proceedings in relation to the December 2010 election. Joined the reserve forces in February 2012 | |
| Sergey Ivanov | Deputy Head of Supply Division of the Ideological and Personnel Directorate of the Minsk Municipal Department of Internal Affairs | Actively participated in the crackdown of the 19 December 2010 protests. For this, he received an award and an acknowledgement letter from President Alexander Lukashenko in February 2011 | |
| Alexander Lukomski | Commander of the Special Regiment of the Ministry of Interior of the City of Minsk | His troops repressed the protests on 19 December 2010 and in June 2011. For his actions in December 2010, he was awarded by President Lukashenko in February 2011. | |
| Oleg Pekarski | Former first Deputy Minister of Internal Affairs | Responsible for the repression of civil society after the December 2010 presidential elections | |
| Yevgeny Poluden | Former Deputy Minister of Internal Affairs and Head of the Militsiya (police) | Under his command, police forces brutally repressed the peaceful demonstrations on 19 December 2010 | |
| Alexander Barsukov | Colonel, Chief of Minsk police. | Appointed as Chief of Minsk police on 21 October 2011 and was responsible in this role for the repression of approximately a dozen peaceful protesters in Minsk, who were later convicted for breaking the law on mass events. For several years he commanded police action against street protests of the opposition | |
| Khazalbek Atabekov | Colonel, commander of a special brigade of Interior Troops stationed in the Uruchcha suburb of Minsk | His unit participated in the crackdown of the mass protests on 19 December 2010. Atabekov's actions constituted a direct violation of Belarus' international obligations in the area of human rights | |
| Igor Yevseyev | Head of the regional Vitebsk police; former Deputy Head of Minsk Police and Head of the Minsk anti-riot (OMON) operation team | His unit participated in the crackdown of the mass protests on 19 December 2010, he personally took part in the brutality and received an award and an acknowledgement letter from President Lukashenko. In 2011, he also commanded the troops that repressed several other protests by political activists and citizens in Minsk | |

== Structure ==
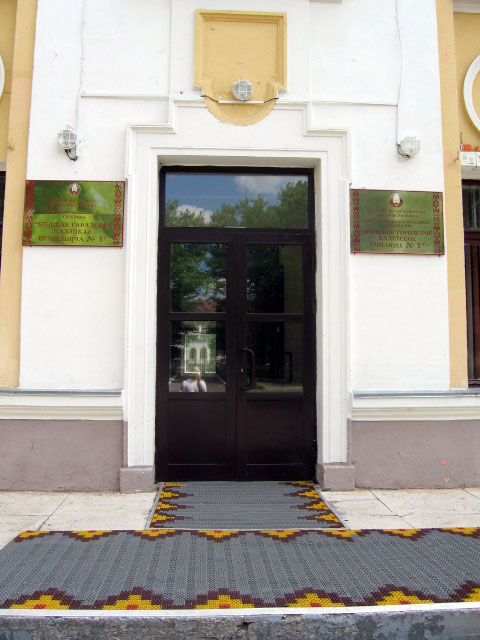
Minsk City Cadet College No. 1

Its law enforcement central agency, the Militsiya, is considered to be the main policing and law enforcement agency in Belarus, consisting of services such as:

- Criminal Police
  - Central Department of Criminal Investigation
  - Central Department for Combatting Economic Crimes
  - Department for Drug Control and Trafficking in Human Beings Combatting
  - Bureau of Day-to-Day Information Service
- Public Security Police
  - Central Department for Law and Order Ensuring and Prevention of Crimes
  - Department of State Traffic Police
  - Department of Daily On-Duty Service
  - AMAP/OMON
- Minister's Personnel
- Official representatives of the MIA
- Central Personnel Department
- Central Department of Ideological Work
- Central Department of Internal Security
- Central Department of Controlling and Auditing
- Main Directorate for Combatting Organized Crime and Corruption
- Headquarters
- International Cooperation Department
- Department of State Secrets Protection
- Bureau of Preparedness Activity and Area Defense
- Department of Day-to-Day Investigation Activity
- Department of Citizenship and Migration
- Department for Execution of Judgments
- Department of Finance and Logistics
- Internal Troops
- Department of Security
- Interpol National Central Bureau of Belarus
- Department of Information and Public Relations
- Department of High-Tech Crimes Detection (Department "K")
- Department of Supervision Activities
- Regional affiliates
  - Minsk City Police Department
  - Brest City Police Department
  - Gomel City Police Department
  - Mogilev City Police Department
  - Vitebsk City Police Department
- Educational Institutions
  - Academy of the Ministry of Internal Affairs
  - Mogilev Institute of the Ministry of Internal Affairs
  - Centre for Professional Development of Executives and Specialists of the Ministry of Internal Affairs
  - Faculty of Interior Troops of the Military Academy of Belarus
  - Minsk City Cadet College No. 1

=== Internal Troops ===
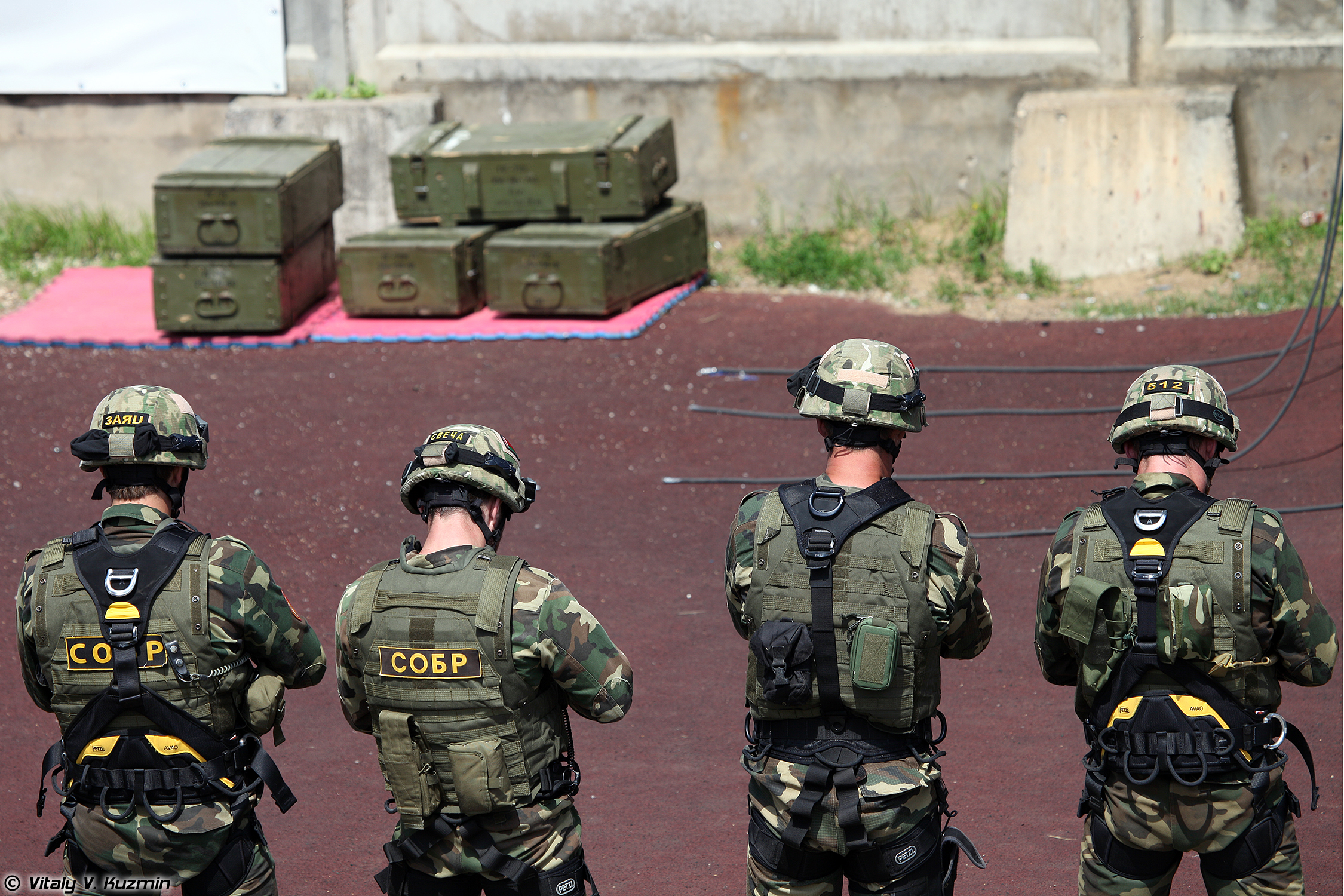
The Special Purpose Unit of the Internal Troops.

The Internal Troops (Унутраныя войскі) are a uniformed paramilitary gendarmerie force of Belarus. They were formed from the former Soviet Internal Troops following the collapse of the Soviet Union and consist of three independent brigades and seven independent battalions, totaling round 12,000 personnel. The Internal Troops are regulated by Law No. 2341-XII, signed on 3 June 1993.

Among the Internal Troop formations is the Minsk-based 3rd Red Banner Separate Special-Purpose Brigade (Military 3214, nicknamed the "Uruchenskaya Brigade"). Formed in the 1990s on the basis of the 334th Regiment of the 120th Guards Motor Rifle Division, this specific brigade performs crowd control and anti-terrorism tasks, as well as provides assistance to border guards. In addition, the brigade also trains for combined arms operations in the event an armed conflict arises.

=== Militsiya ===
Following the example of the Soviet Militsiya, the Militsiya of the Republic of Belarus is the primary law enforcement agency in Belarus and is responsible for regular policing duties in the country.

== Cultural organizations of the MUS ==
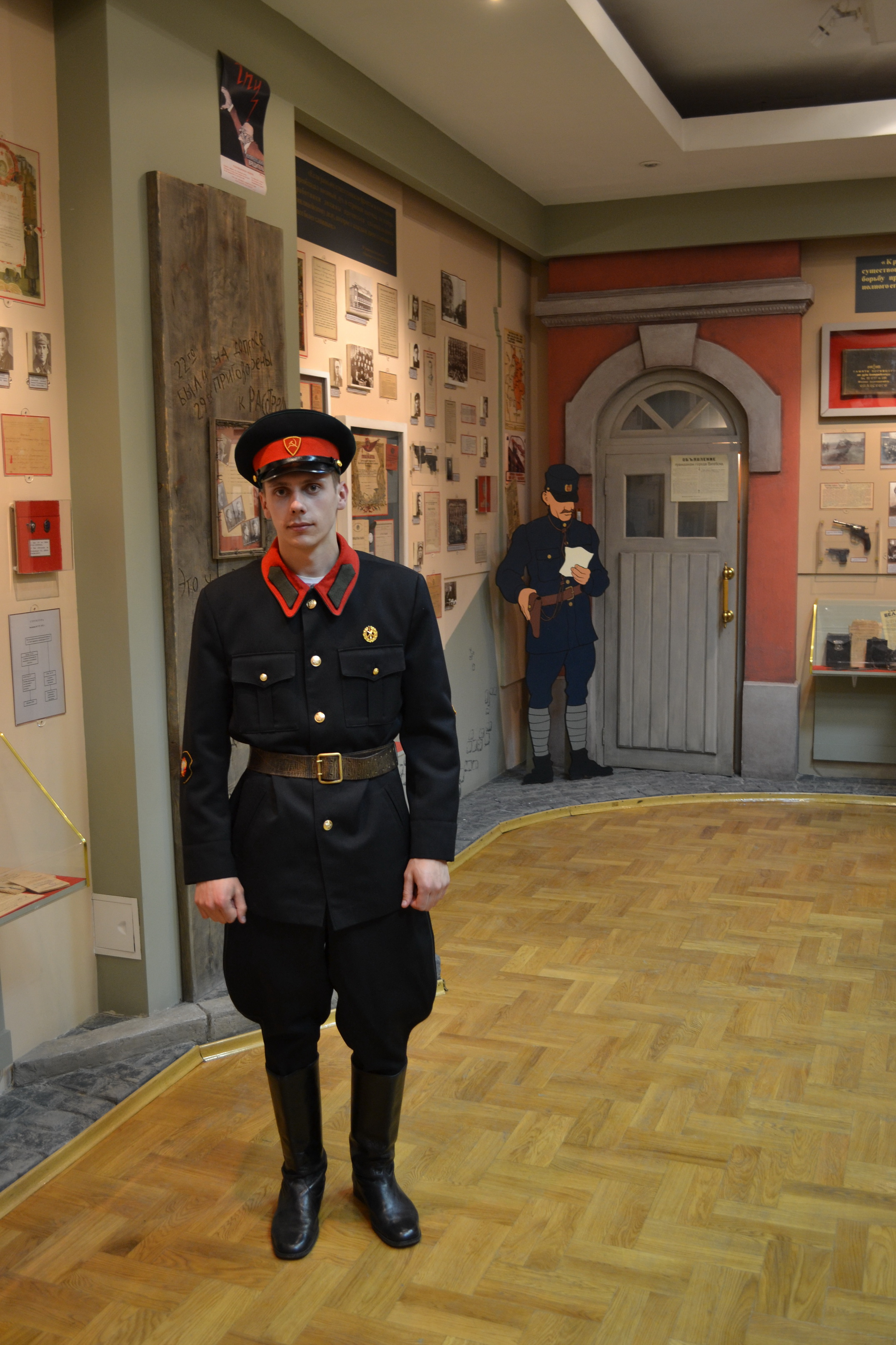
A reenactor in the MUS Museum

- The Museum of the Ministry of Internal Affairs of the Republic of Belarus (Russian: Музей МВД), Belarusian: Музей МУС) is an official ministerial and cultural institution of the Ministry of Internal Affairs. It was opened on 24 October 1986 as an exhibition devoted to the history of law enforcement agencies on the territory of modern Belarus of the Grand Duchy of Lithuania to present. It underwent a major restoration in the beginning of September 2005.
- Na Strazhe (Russian: На страже), which translates to On Guard in English is a departmental newspaper of the Ministry of Internal Affairs. The signature of all police officers on the newspaper is mandatory. The newspaper was published intermittently from 1942–1944. and from 1970–1977. From 1945, it began to be published under the Russian name On guard of October. Since 3 July 1992 it has been published under the title On guard.

=== Band Service and Exemplary Band ===
The Exemplary Band of the Ministry of Internal Affairs was founded on 20 July 1945 as a military band of the 21st Motorized Rifle Detachment of the Ministry of State Security. Known informally as the Belpolk Band, it was considered to be one of the more prestigious of its kind and often won contests of military bands. On 28 April 1995, the band was re-branded as its current name. Colonel Nikolai Zharko became the first artistic director and chief conductor of the band. Its first concert took place on the first Day of the Militia parade on 4 March 1995 at October Square. It often is notably present as part of a joint band of the Minsk Garrison during the Minsk Independence Day Parade. It is also part of the Military Band Service of Internal Troops of Belarus. The band is currently led by Lieutenant Colonel Alexander Kalinin while the service is led by Lieutenant Colonel Sergei Solodukhin.

== Interior Ministers ==
- Uladzimir Yahorau (1990–1994)
- Yury Zakharanka (1994–1995)
- Valyantsin Ahalets (1995–1999)
- Yuri Sivakov (1999–2000)
- Uladzimir Navumau (2000–2009)
- Anatoly Kuleshov (2009–2012)
- Igor Shunevich (2012–2019)
- Yury Karayeu (2019-2020)
- Ivan Kubrakov (since 2020)

== See also ==
- Government of Belarus
- Law enforcement in Belarus
- Minsk City Police Department
