= Almaz (Belarus) =

Special Anti-Terrorism Unit
- Russian: СПБТ «Алмаз»
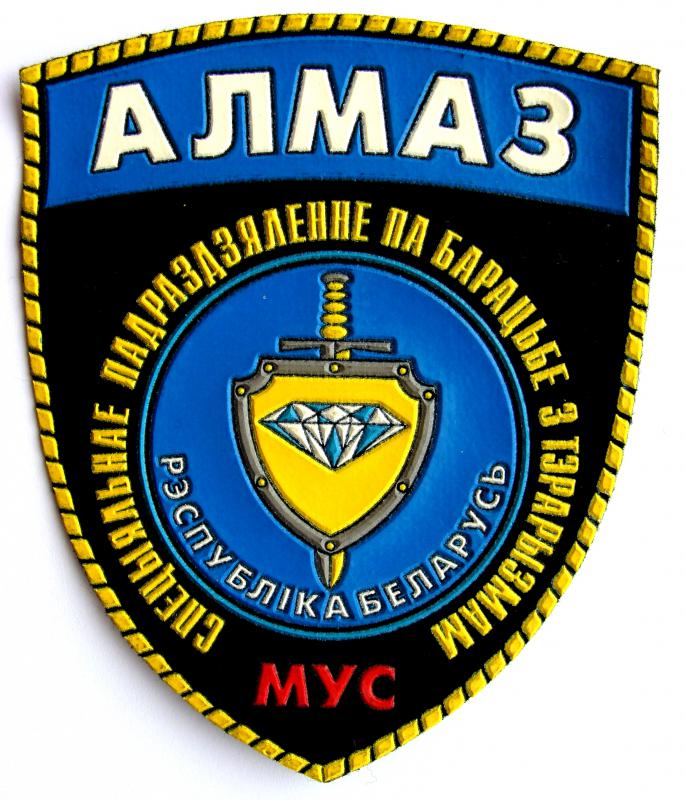
- Shoulder patch and flag of the Almaz special operations unit
- Active: 2 January 1991 – present
- Country: Belarus
- Agency: Ministry of Internal Affairs
- Type: Police tactical unit
- Operations jurisdiction: National
- Headquarters: Minsk
- Common name: Almaz
- Abbreviation: SPBT

Almaz Special Anti-Terrorism Unit (SPBT Almaz) (Russian: Специальное подразделение по борьбе с терроризмом «Алмаз» (СПБТ «Алмаз»)) is a police tactical unit of the Ministry of Internal Affairs of the Republic of Belarus (MUS) that specialized in counterterrorism and hostage rescue crisis management, quick raid to capture or kill (if necessary) high-value targets, riot control in detention facilities, and VIP protection.

The unit's missions primarily involve anti-irregular military, apprehension of armed and dangerous criminals, counterterrorism and hostage rescue crisis management, executive protection, high-risk tactical law enforcement situations, operating in difficult to access terrain, protecting high-level meeting areas, providing security in areas at risk of attack or terrorism, special reconnaissance in difficult to access and dangerous areas, support crowd control and riot control, and tactical special operations.

== History ==
The special purpose detachment of the Ministry of Internal Affairs of the Byelorussian Soviet Socialist Republic "Berkut" was created on January 2, 1991 in accordance with the order of the Ministry of Internal Affairs of the USSR (MVD) of December 14, 1990. This was the first special tactical unit of the Ministry of Internal Affairs on the territory of the republic. Initially, the "Berkut" detachment was subordinate to the Department for Execution of Punishments of the Ministry of Internal Affairs of the BSSR.

The first commander of the unit was the militia captain Uladzimir Navumau, then the commander of a patrol company.

In 1994, the commander of the "Berkut" Naumov put forward an initiative to reorganize and rename the special forces. In the fall of 1994, the unit was transformed into a special tactical unit of the Ministry of Internal Affairs of the Republic of Belarus with subordination to the minister personally and received a new name - "Almaz". The unit was assigned new tasks, including participation in the fight against organized criminal groups, the detention of especially dangerous and armed criminals.

In the first 15 years of its existence, SPBT Almaz was involved in combat missions 6383 times; conducted 4161 combat and special operations; freed 106 hostages; stopped a number of terrorist acts; detained 4559 criminals who committed grave and especially grave crimes; seized and defused 2,932 explosive devices; seized 464 units of firearms and 24386 pcs. ammunition, as well as 119,136 kg of drugs.

== Tasks ==
The main tasks of the unit during this period were:

- Crisis management responding to the terrorist event for tactical operations counterterrorism and hostage rescue
- Engaging heavily armed criminals
- High-risk tactical law enforcement situations
- Providing security on locations that are at risk of attack or terrorism
- Raiding high-value targets for capture or kill (if necessary)
- Riot control in detention facilities
- Serving high-risk arrest and search warrants
- Support crowd control and riot control when people or prisoners who are involved in a riot, unlawful demonstration or unlawful protest
- Tactical special operations
- VIP protection
