= Presidential Security Service (Belarus) =

Belarusian law enforcement agency

Presidential Security Service of Belarus Служба бяспекі прэзідэнта Рэспублікі Беларусь (Belarusian)
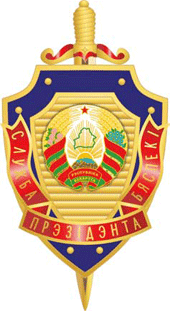
- Emblem

- Flag (Obverse)

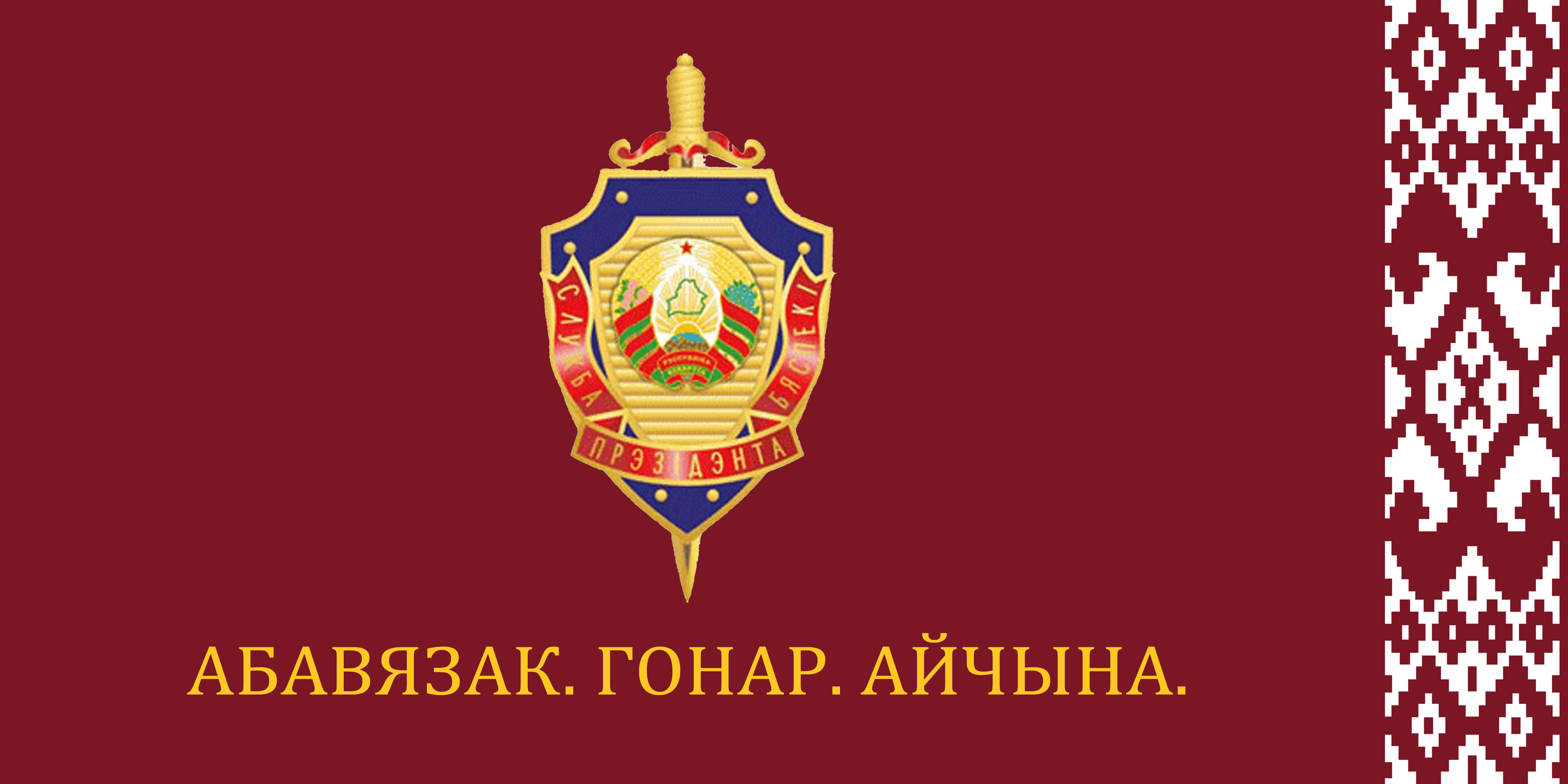
- Flag (Reverse)
- Common name: Presidential Security Service
- Abbreviation: SBP

Agency overview
- Formed: 1994
- Preceding agency: Ninth Chief Directorate (KGB)

Jurisdictional structure
- Operations jurisdiction: Belarus
- Governing body: Presidential Administration of Belarus
- Specialist jurisdiction: Protection of international or domestic VIPs, protection of significant state assets

Operational structure
- Headquarters: Minsk
- Agency executive: Dzmitry Šachrajeŭ, Commander

The Belarusian Presidential Guard or officially the Presidential Security Service (Belarusian: Служба бяспекі прэзідэнта Рэспублікі Беларусь, romanized: Sluzhba byaspyeki prezidenta, Russian: Служба безопасности Президента Республики Беларусь) is a law-enforcement body that was designed to protect the President of Belarus and other high-ranking officials and officers.

== History ==
According to the US and the European Union, the Presidential Security Service and its commanders are actively involved in human rights violations and political repressions in Belarus.

=== Role during the referendum of 1996 ===
According to the Belarusian opposition, the Presidential Security Service has played a key role in the events around the controversial referendum of 1996, which has resulted in the dissolution of the disloyal Supreme Soviet of Belarus and an ultimate concentration of state power in the hands of authoritarian president Alexander Lukashenko.

Before the controversial referendum, the Presidential Security Service has blocked the office of the Central Election Commission of Belarus and prevented the Head of the commission, Viktar Hanchar from executing his role. Lidia Yermoshina, a member of the Commission loyal to Lukashenko, has been appointed instead of Hanchar. Three years later, Viktar Hanchar has disappeared and was presumably murdered.

After the events, the United States State Department stated that the Presidential Guard is a secret police force under the control of President Alexander Lukashenko. The State Department in 1996 stated the guard was allowed to use force "against the President's political enemies with no judicial or legislative oversight."

=== Sanctions against officers of the Presidential Guard ===
Several former Heads of the Presidential Security Service have been included in the sanctions lists of the European Union and the United States:

- Vladimir Naumov as former Minister of Interior has allegedly failed to investigate the unresolved disappearances of opposition leaders Yuri Zakharenko and Viktar Hanchar, opposition sponsor Anatoly Krasovski, and journalist Dmitri Zavadski in 1999–2000. He has been included in the sanctions list of the European Union in 2011 and is one of four persons remaining under EU sanctions after 2016. He is also on the sanctions list of the United States. Besides that, as one of the persons accused of involvement in the disappearances of 1999–2000, Naumov remains one of the few people on the sanctions list of the United States.
- Gennady Nevyglas, according to the EU Council's decision following the 2010 wave of repressions, was "responsible for organising fraudulent [presidential] elections in 2006 and in the subsequent repression of peaceful demonstrators". He has been included in the sanctions list of the European Union in 2011.
- Yuri Zhadobin has been described in the EU Council's 2012 decision on sanctions as follows: "As a member of the Security Council, he approves the repressive decisions agreed at ministerial level, including the decision to repress the peaceful demonstrations on 19 December 2010. After December 2010, he praised the "total defeat of destructive forces", when referring to the democratic opposition." He has been included in the sanctions list of the European Union in 2011.
- Andrei Vtiurin has allegedly supervised interrogations of arrested protesters after the demonstrations that followed 2010 presidential elections. He has been included in the sanctions list of the European Union in 2011.

== Organization ==
=== Structure ===
The SBP has an anti-terrorist unit, known as the "Anti-T".

=== Commanders ===
- Vyacheslav Korolev (November 1994 - 1995)
- Yuri Borodich (1995 - December 2, 1998)
- Vladimir Kuzhanov (Acting) (December 2, 1998 - January 20, 1999)
- Uladzimir Navumau (January 20, 1999 - September 25, 2000)
- Leonid Erin (September 25 - November 27, 2000)
- Gennady Nevyglas (December 4, 2000 - September 12, 2001)
- Vladimir Klimov (Acting) (September 19, 2001 - October 5, 2001)
- Evgeny Dvernitsky (October 5, 2001 - September 10, 2003)
- Yuri Zhadobin (September 10, 2003 - July 17, 2007)
- Andrey Vtiurin (July 17, 2007 - September 11, 2014)
- Viktor Shinkevich (October 20, 2014 - December 21, 2016)
- Andrei Pavlyuchenko (21 December 2016 — 11 December 2017)
- Dmitry Shakhrayev (From 11 December 2017)
