= Ministry of the Interior Academy of the Republic of Belarus =

Military academy in Minsk, Belarus

Ministry of the Interior Academy of Belarus
- Акадэмія Міністэрства ўнутраных спраў Рэспублікі Беларусь
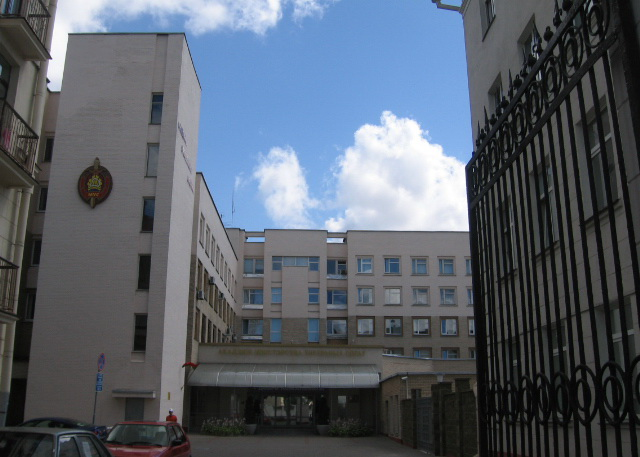
- Type: University
- Established: 16 May 1958
- Location: Minsk, Belarus; 53°54′55″N 27°34′3″E
- Campus: Urban
- Website: amia.by
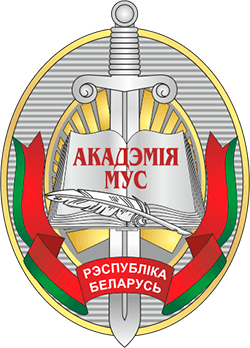

The Ministry of the Interior Academy of the Republic of Belarus (Belarusian: Акадэмія Міністэрства ўнутраных спраў Рэспублікі Беларусь, romanized: Akademija Ministerstva ŭnutranych spraŭ Respubliki Bielaruś; Russian: Академия Министерства внутренних дел Республики Беларусь) is a Belarusian military institution located in Minsk, Belarus. It is part of the Ministry of Internal Affairs of Belarus.

== History ==
The Minsk High School of the Ministry of Internal Affairs of the USSR was established on 16 May 1958 on the basis of the preceding Minsk police academy. The main structural units of the school became the training faculty and the Vilnius and Riga faculty for long-distance learning. In September 1973, the school of was transformed into a regional faculty of the larger Academy of the Ministry of Internal Affairs of the USSR, based in Moscow. On 1 January 1976, the Minsk Higher School of the Soviet MVD was reestablished on the basis of this faculty. Political transformations of the second half of the 1980s necessitated the improvement of higher legal education, especially in the law enforcement sphere. Its main areas were therefore the fundamentalization and humanization of the teaching of legal disciplines and the introduction of computer technology into the educational process. In the summer of 1985, a detachment of the school took part in the protection of public order during the 12th World Festival of Youth and Students in Moscow and was recognized by the leadership of the national interior ministry as one of the best. In April 1992, the Militsiya Academy was established, becoming an organ of the interior ministry in September 1995.

== Present day ==
Future officers are trained at the academy by specialists at sub-units such as the Faculty of Law, the Faculty of Advanced Studies and the Retraining of Leading Personnel. The academy has 19 departments, which act as the de facto organizers/participants of scientific forums. It is a member of the International Association of Police Academies (INTERPA). On graduation day, cadets traditionally wear the shoulder straps of police lieutenants. It has been awarded the Prize of the Government of Belarus twice.

== Notable alumni ==
- Adilgerei Magomedtagirov, interior minister of Dagestan in the mid-late 2000s
- Uladzimir Navumau, Head of the Presidential Security Service of Belarus from January 1999 to September 2000
- Vitaliy Zakharchenko, Ukrainian and senior consultant at the Rostec corporation
- Viktor Sheiman, former Chief of Staff to the President of Belarus
- Andrei Ostapovich
- Aliaksandr Azarau, head of the Belarusian opposition police group BYPOL.

== See also ==
- Military Academy of Belarus
- University of Civil Protection of the Ministry of Emergency Situations (Belarus)
- National Academy of Internal Affairs
- Moscow University of the Ministry of Internal Affairs of Russia
- Ștefan cel Mare Police Academy
