= Internal Troops of Belarus =

Military unit

Internal Troops of Belarus Унутраныя войскі МУС Беларусі Внутренние войска МВД Unutranyja vojski MUS Belarusi Vnutrenniye voyska MVD
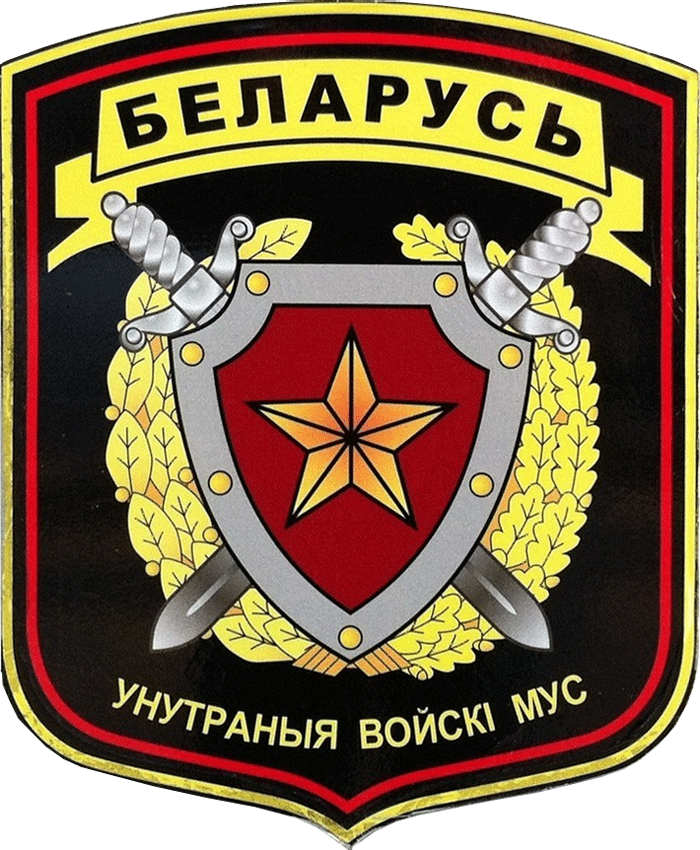

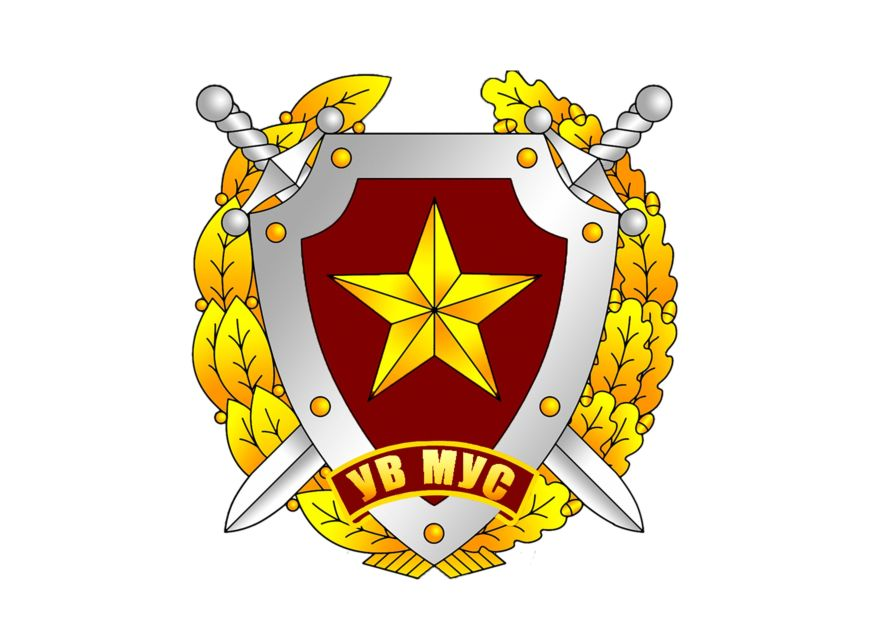

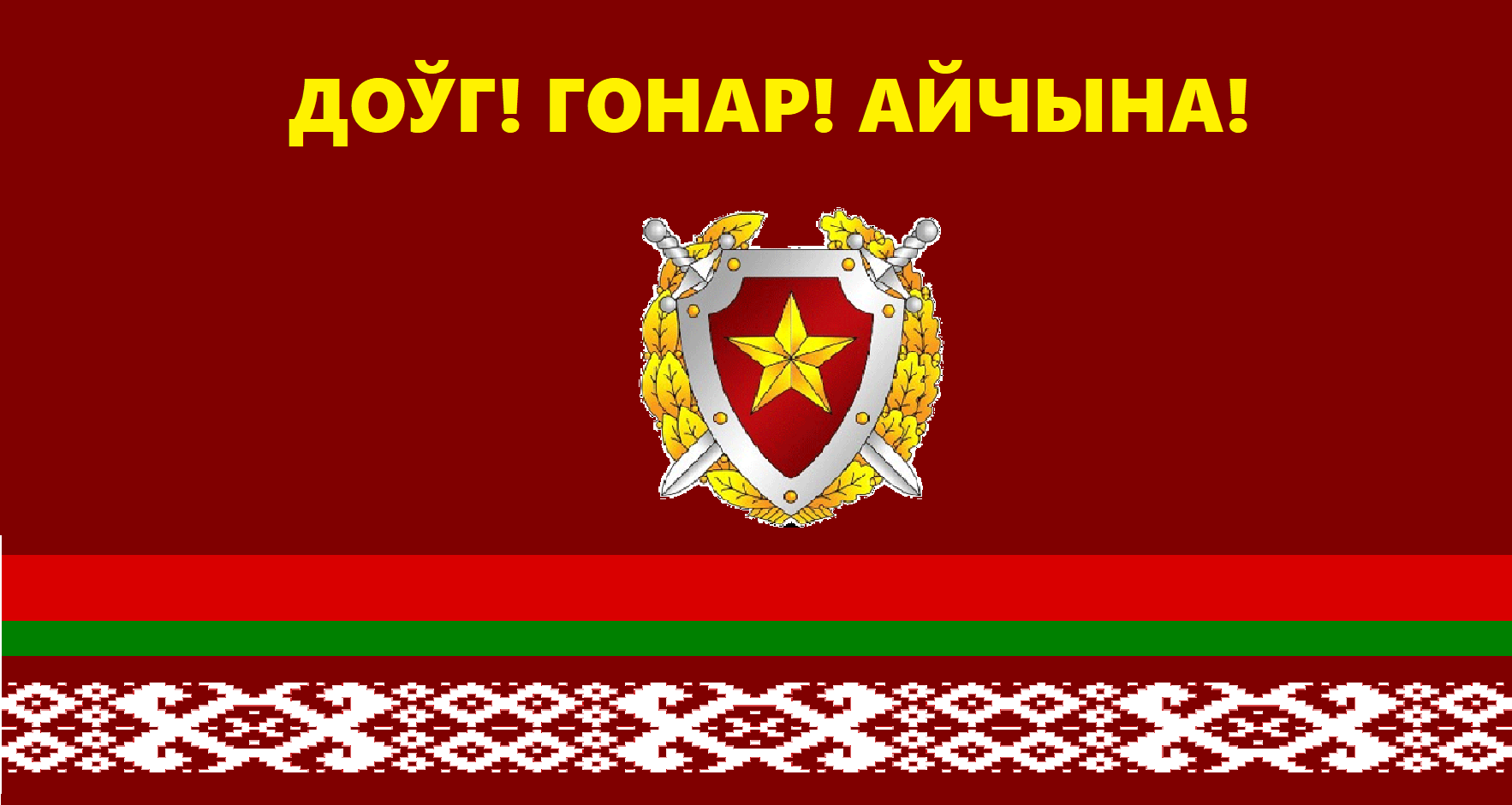
- Abbreviation: УВ МУС Беларусі; UV MUS Belarusi
- Motto: Абавязак! Гонар! Айчына! Duty! Honor! Fatherland!

Agency overview
- Formed: 24 March 1992
- Preceding agency: 43rd Convoy Division
- Employees: 12,000
- Annual budget: 375 mln Br (2024; $108 mln)

Jurisdictional structure
- Operations jurisdiction: Belarus
- General nature: Gendarmerie

Operational structure
- Headquarters: Minsk
- Agency executives: Nikolai Karpenkov, Commander; Aliaksandr Bykau, Chief of Staff
- Parent agency: Ministry of Internal Affairs

Notables
- Significant operations: Jeans Revolution; 2020–2021 Belarusian protests; 2022 rail war in Belarus
- Anniversary: 18 March

Internal Troops of the Ministry of Internal Affairs of Belarus (Belarusian: Унутраныя войскі МУС Беларусі, romanized: Unutranyja vojski MUS Belarusi; Russian: Внутренние войска МВД, romanized: Vnutrenniye voyska MVD) is a paramilitary law enforcement force in the Republic of Belarus under the national Ministry of Internal Affairs. All personnel are trained in the Internal Troops Faculty of the Military Academy of Belarus.

== History ==
The Internal Troops trace their history to a separate command of guards in Vitebsk, formed on 18 March 1918. Subsequently, the team was transformed into the 5th Byelorussian Convoy Regiment. Later, as the organs of the internal troops of the Ministry of Internal Affairs, units of NKVD were formed. All of the units participated in Russian Civil War, the Second World War, the Soviet–Afghan War and in responding to the aftermath of the 1986 Chernobyl disaster in the country's southwest.

On 22 November 1968, the 22nd Department of Escort and Protection (sometimes translated as Convoy and Protection) was reorganized as the 43rd Escort [or Convoy] Division, with its headquarters at Minsk. Two years later it had reached a strength of three escort or convoy regiments, a motorized regiment, and an independent special motorized militia battalion. At the end of the 1980s, Internal Troops units were involved in the inter ethnic conflicts in the territory of the Soviet Union.

After the dissolution of the Soviet Union, the formations and units of the troops deployed in Belarus became the Internal Troops of the Ministry of Internal Affairs of the Republic of Belarus, created on the organizational basis of the 43rd Convoy Division.

On 3 June 1993, the Law of the Republic of Belarus "On Internal Troops of the Ministry of Internal Affairs of the Republic of Belarus" was adopted, the process of qualitative changes and reforming began. In 1994, civil defense headquarters was incorporated into the internal troops. On 8 November 1995, President Alexander Lukashenko approved the organizational structure and deployment of internal troops. On 7 May 1998, the internal troops were presented with the Combat Banners and new state symbols.

The conclusion of the process of reforming the troops was declared on 19 June 2001. The corresponding decree provides for the establishment of the Day of Internal Troops on March 18, celebrated annually. In 2003, the Belarusian House of Representatives adopted a new version of the Law "On Internal Troops of the Ministry of Internal Affairs of the Republic of Belarus".

After the elections and protests in 2020, some of the leaders of the internal troops came under sanctions. Namely, on 2 October 2020, the European Union included in its sanctions list the commander of the Internal Troops Yuri Nazarenko and his deputy Khazalbek Atabekov, on December 17 – the first deputy commander of the internal troops and the chief of staff Igor Burmistrov, and on 21 June 2021 – the new commander of the Internal Troops Mikalai Karpiankou. The United Kingdom and Switzerland also imposed sanctions against these four individuals. In addition, Atabekov, Nazarenko and Karpiankou were included in the Canadian sanctions list and in the SDN list of the US.

On 21 June 2021, the U.S. Treasury has added the Internal Troops themselves to the SDN list.

Excerpt from the statement by the U.S. Treasury:

The Internal Troops of the Ministry of Internal Affairs of the Republic of Belarus (Internal Troops), a Belarusian police force subordinate to the Ministry of Internal Affairs (MVD), has been involved in the violent suppression of peaceful protesters in multiple locations in Belarus since the August 9, 2020, fraudulent presidential election. On October 2, 2020, OFAC designated the Internal Troops’ then-Commander Yuriy Nazaranka and Deputy Commander Khazalbek Atabekau pursuant to E.O. 13405 for being responsible for, or having participated in, actions or policies that undermine democratic processes or institutions in Belarus.

In 2022, the Internal Troops were blacklisted by the European Union, Switzerland and Japan. In August 2023, Canada also imposed sanctions against the Internal Troops.

== Organization ==
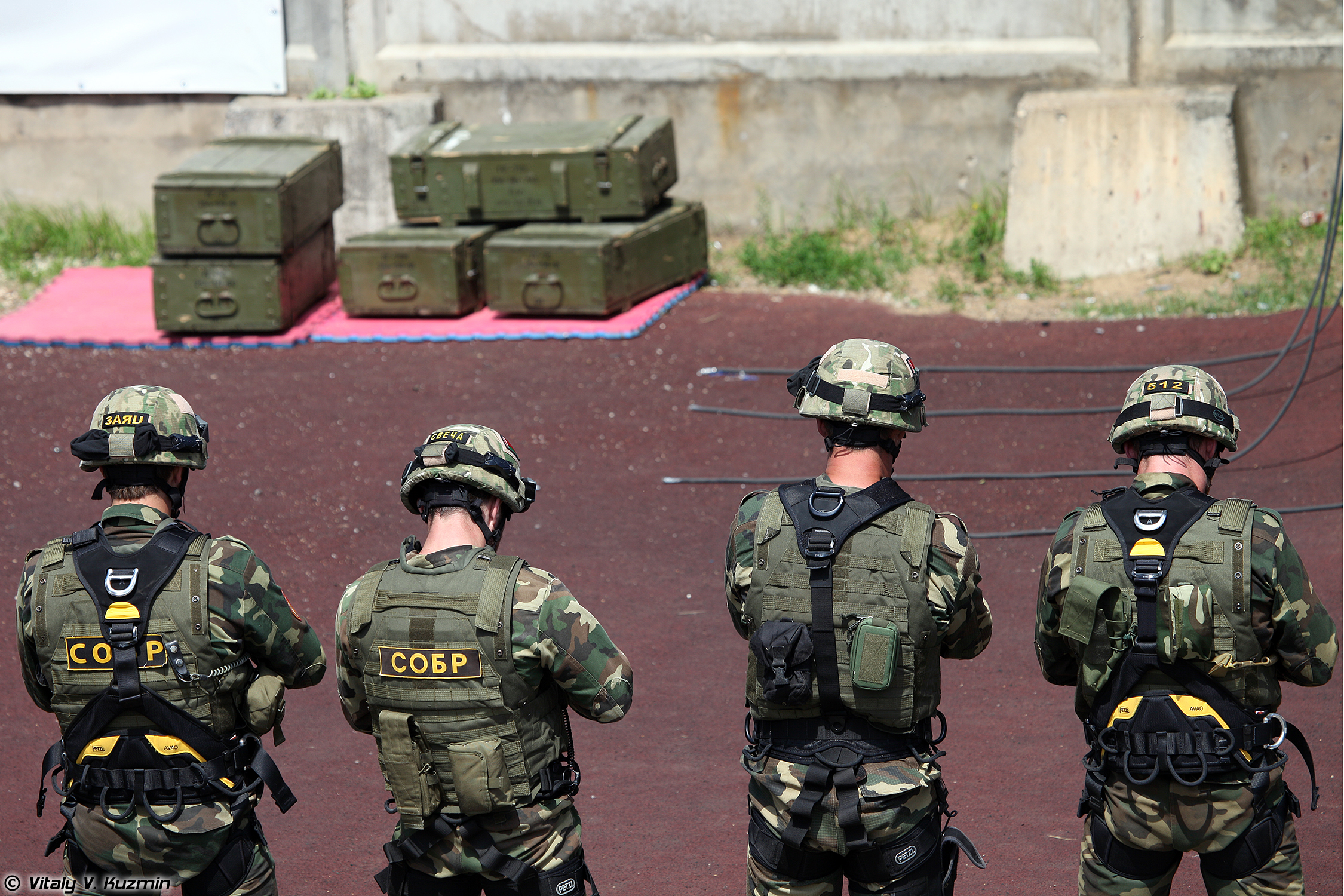
The Special Purpose Unit of Belarus of the Internal Troops.

As of 2024, they consist of the following elements:

- High Command of the Internal Troops
- Special Purpose Brigades
  - 3rd Separate Special-Purpose Brigade (Minsk)
- Police Brigades
  - 2nd Separate Special-Police Brigade (Military Unit 3310)
    - Tornado Special Forces Detachment
  - 4th Separate Special-Police Brigade
  - 5th Separate Special-Police Brigade
  - 6th Separate Special-Police Brigade
  - 7th Separate Special-Police Brigade
- 2 security teams
- 7 battalions
  - 2nd Separate Special-Police Battalion
  - 5th Separate Special-Purpose Battalion

=== Gallery ===
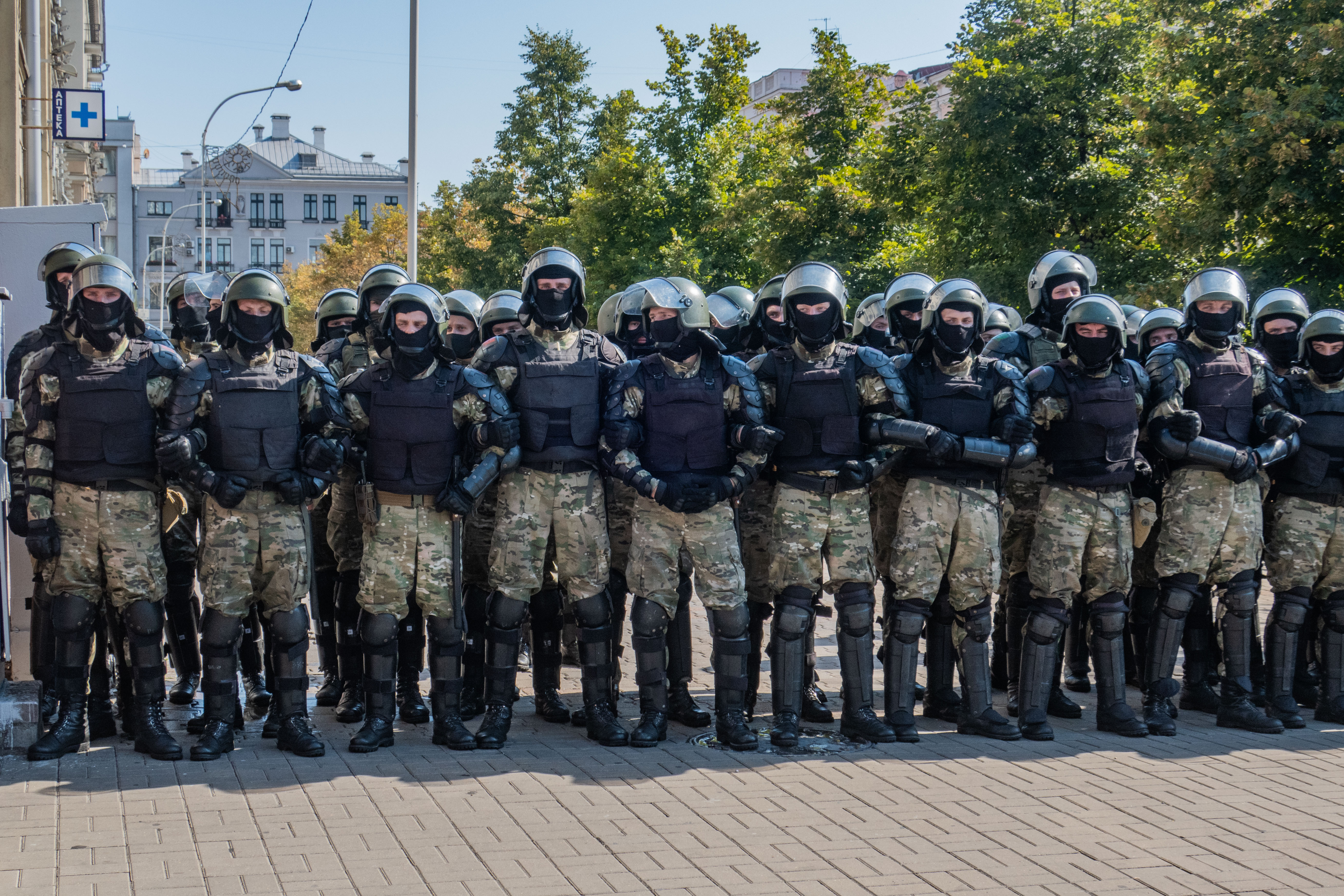
Internal Troops during the 2020 Belarusian protests

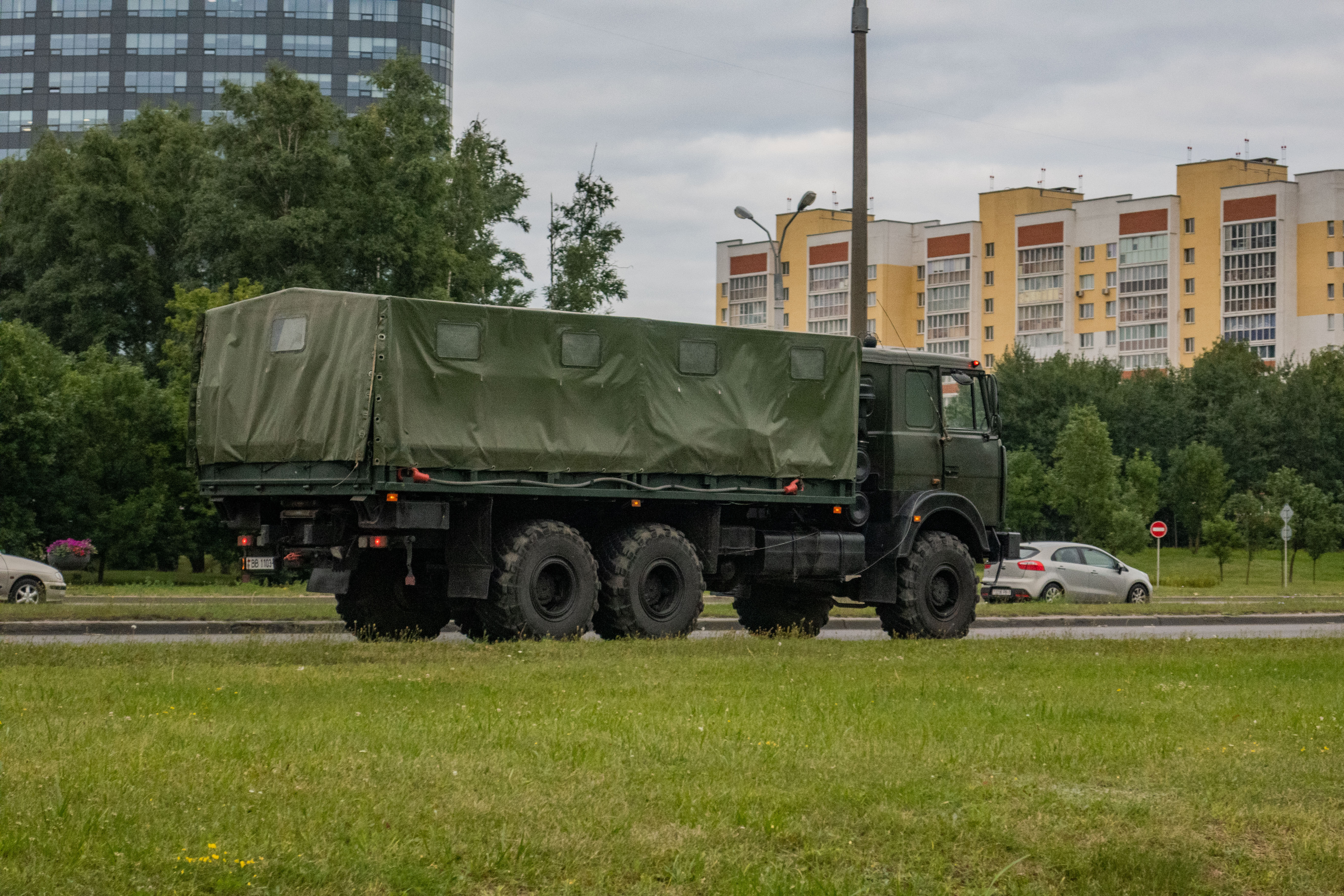
Truck of internal troops

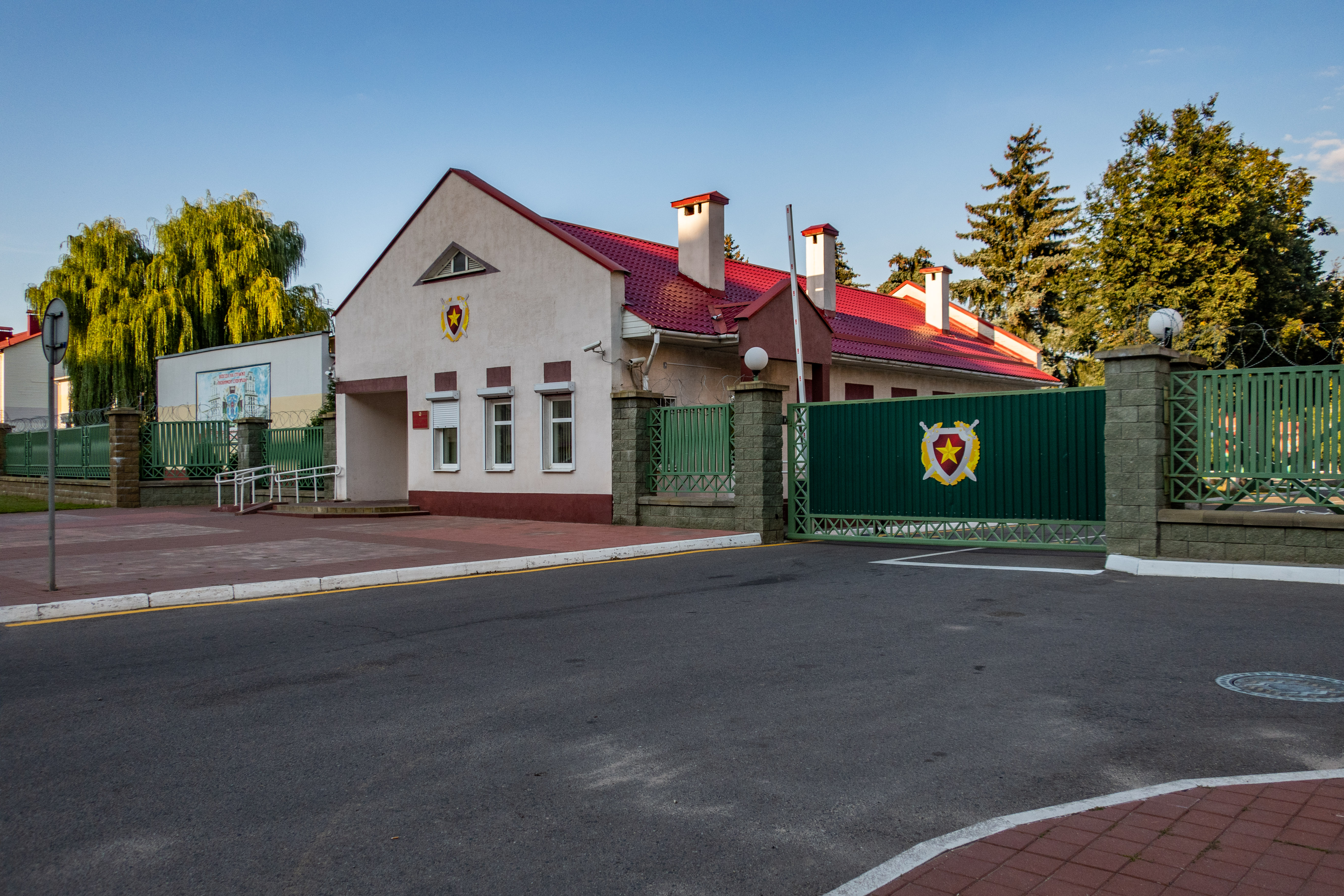
Barracks of the 1st Special Purpose Militia Brigade, Ulitsa Maykovskoya, Minsk, 2019

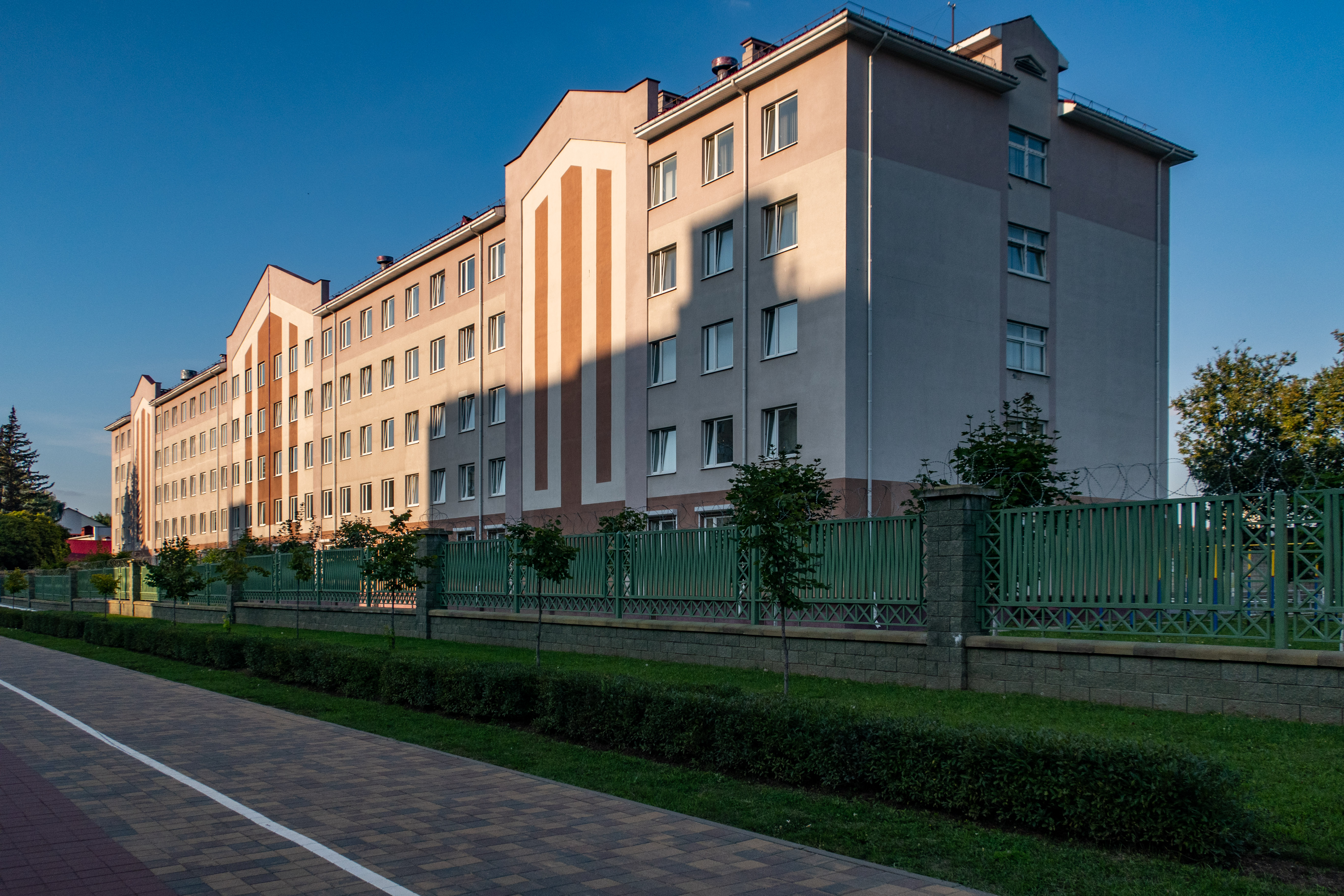
One of the bases in Minsk

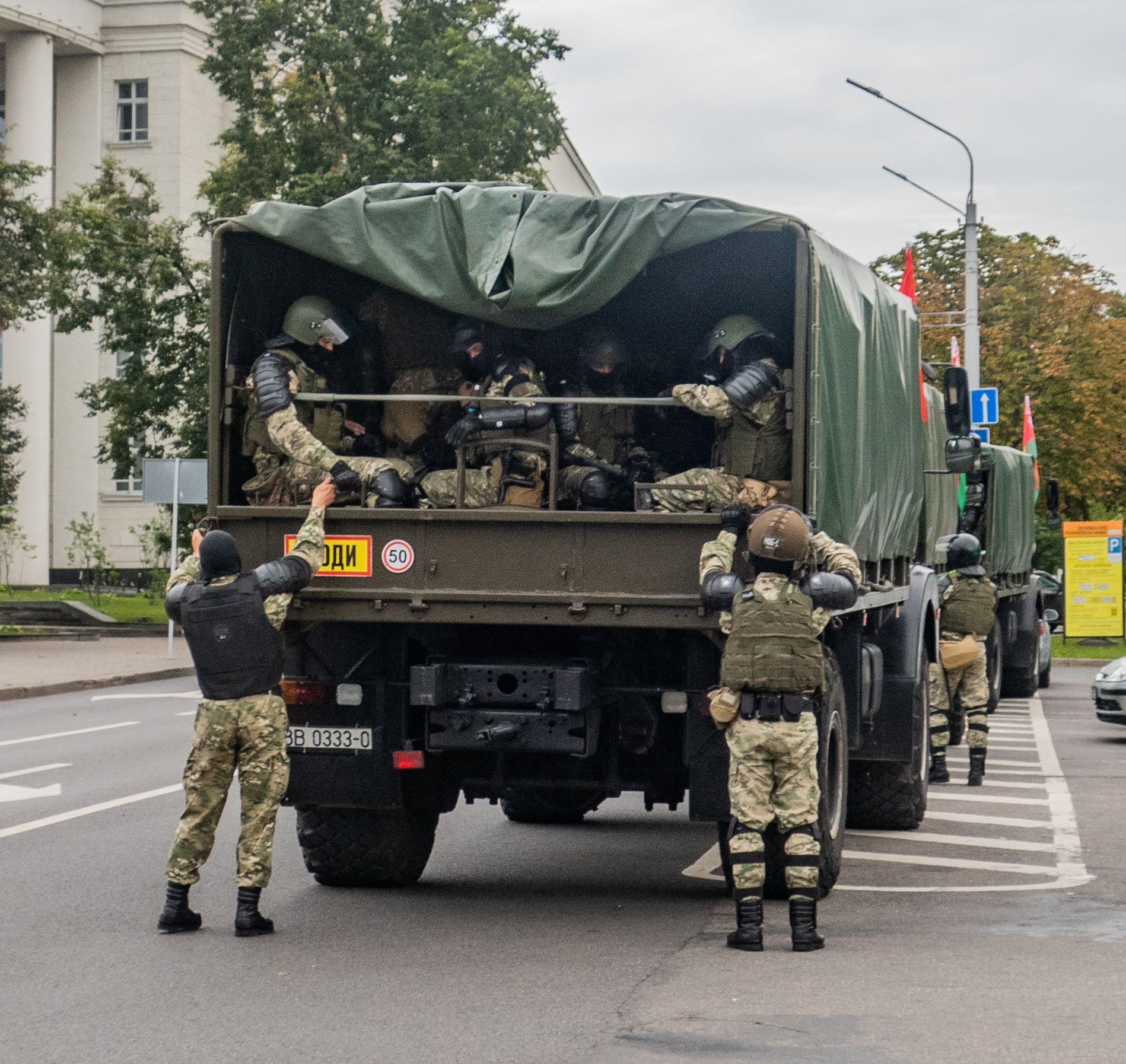
Truck and troopers

== Missions ==
The missions of the Internal Troops are as follows:

- Guard important cargo
- Guard corrective institutions
- Maintain social order and stop violations of the law that risk public safety
- Dismantle illegal armed formations
- Prevent domestic and foreign terrorism on Belarusian soil
- Prepares for combined arms operations in the event of armed conflict

== Commanders ==
- Major General Yury Nazarenko
- Nikolai Karpenkov (since 20 November 2020)
