= Genocide of the Belarusian people =

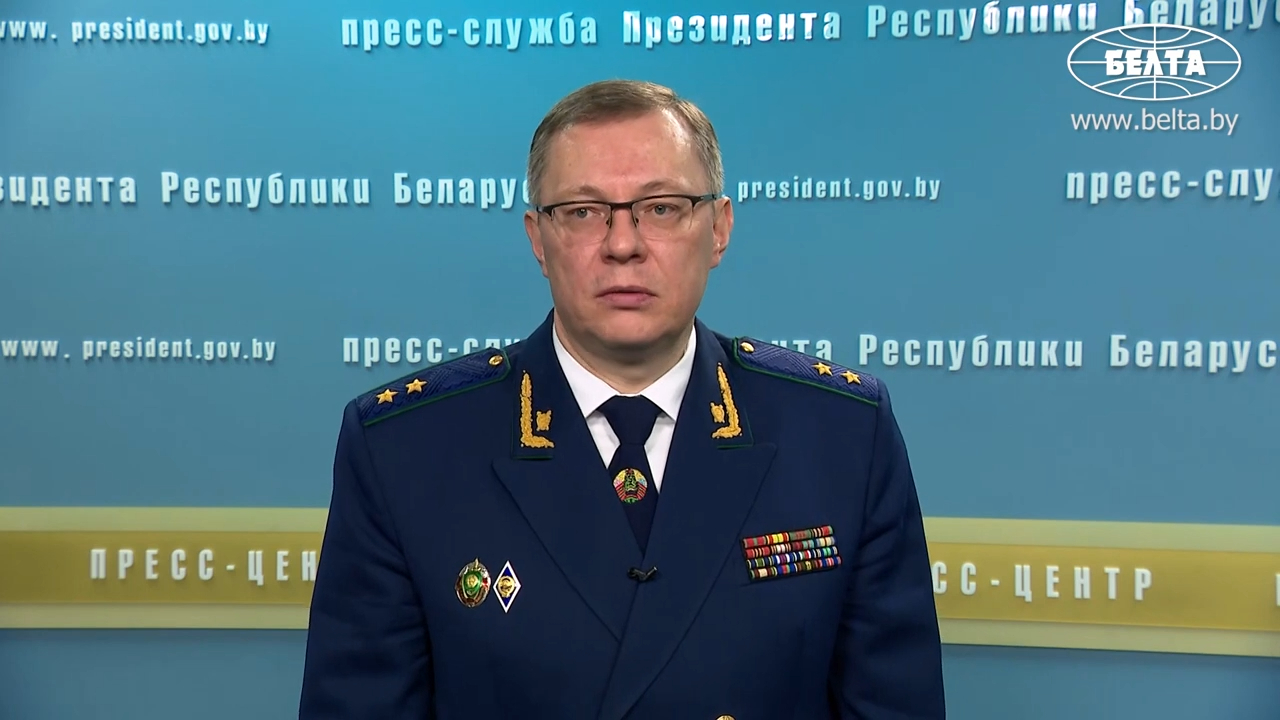
Prosecutor General of Belarus in 2020–2025 Andrei Shved, the main author of the "Genocide of the Belarusian people" concept.

The Genocide of the Belarusian people (Belarusian: Генацыд беларускага народа Russian: Геноцид белорусского народа) is a legislative and ideological concept in Belarus, initiated in 2021 by Prosecutor General Andrei Shved. Its stated goal is to revise the outcomes of World War II by emphasizing the scale of crimes committed by the Nazis on Belarusian territory while simultaneously drawing parallels between the historical occupiers, modern Western countries, and opponents of the Lukashenko regime. In the propagandistic literature dedicated to this "genocide," images of Belarusian collaborationist formations from World War II are often manipulatively placed next to photographs of the mass protests of 2020 against the further usurpation of power by Aleksandr Lukashenko.

== Background ==
The violent suppression of protests in 2020, which involved the use of weapons and the torture of detainees, led to numerous comparisons of the security forces with Nazi punishers. The violence against protesters, resulting in deaths and severe injuries, was perceived by many as a manifestation of genocide against the Belarusian people—despite formally not meeting the legal definition—and the Lukashenko regime was characterized as fascist. These arguments were further reinforced by the regime's ostentatious disregard for the dangers of the COVID-19 pandemic, which led to an excess mortality of more than 90,000 people in Belarus between 2020 and 2022, the worst rate compared to all neighboring countries.

The Lukashenko regime, whose ideology relies heavily on Soviet narratives and the victory over Nazism in World War II, reacted particularly sensitively to these accusations, as it considers itself the direct heir to this victory. This position was most vividly expressed on 19 October 2020, on the Belarus 1 TV channel, when Mikalai Karpiankou, the head of GUBOPiK—one of the main repressive agencies noted for its extreme brutality during the protests—uttered a phrase that quickly became a catchphrase:

It is you who are fascists, not us. We have not truly used force against anyone yet.

== Building the "genocide" ideology against the West ==
In August 2020, most European Union countries refused to recognize Lukashenko's victory in the presidential election and supported the mass protests. In response to the electoral fraud and violent actions against protesters, by the end of 2020, the EU, the United States, and Canada had adopted three packages of sanctions against the Belarusian authorities, including Aleksandr Lukashenko, members of electoral commissions, leaders and officers of security agencies, and heads of large state-owned enterprises.

On 19 March 2021, speaking to workers at an enterprise in Hrodna, Aleksandr Lukashenko stated:

Here we are gathering materials, and we will now present them to the whole world. And to those who today teach us about democracy, we will show them where the genocide was and what the genocide of the Belarusian people means.

A few days later, speaking at the Khatyn memorial on 21 March, Lukashenko linked the white-red-white flag used by his opponents with the genocide of the Belarusian people.

In early April 2021, the Prosecutor General's Office of Belarus opened a criminal case regarding the genocide of the population of Belarus during the Great Patriotic War and the post-war period. Prosecutor General Andrei Shved stated that it was initiated "in the interests of social and historical justice, eliminating 'blank' spots in history, strengthening the constitutional order, and national security." The results of the investigation were intended to serve as the foundation for ideological, educational, and informational work. The prosecutor also announced the compilation of lists of all deceased and living perpetrators, stating that Belarus would seek the extradition of the latter to face trial.

Subsequently, Shved directly linked the emergence of the criminal case to the political crisis in the country:

During the investigation of a number of criminal cases, it was established that the organization and financing of the aforementioned attacks on the sovereignty and territorial integrity of Belarus are carried out by certain Western European states that were involved in the mass extermination of Belarusians and representatives of other nationalities during the Great Patriotic War and the post-war period.

== Law "On the Genocide of the Belarusian People" ==
In early December 2021, a draft law "On the Genocide of the Belarusian People" was published. It was unanimously adopted by the House of Representatives on 14 December and signed by Lukashenko on 5 January 2022.

The law defines the genocide of the Belarusian people as "crimes committed by Nazi criminals and their accomplices, nationalist formations, during the Great Patriotic War and the post-war period, aimed at the systematic physical extermination of the Belarusian people." The "post-war period" is defined as extending up to 31 December 1951, while the "Belarusian people" refers to "Soviet citizens who lived on the territory of the Byelorussian Soviet Socialist Republic during the Great Patriotic War and (or) the post-war period."

== In education ==
Denying the genocide of the Belarusian people is punishable by restriction of liberty for up to five years or imprisonment for the same term; in the case of a repeated offense, the penalty is 3 to 10 years in prison. The government is instructed to take measures to memorialize the victims of the genocide and seek its recognition and condemnation at the international level.

In 2022, schools began using informational and analytical materials from the criminal investigation into the genocide, provided by the Prosecutor General's Office. In November 2023, newly developed textbooks titled "Genocide of the Belarusian people during the Great Patriotic War" for grades 1–4, 5–9, and 10–11 of secondary schools were introduced. For the 2024 academic year, monthly information hours dedicated to studying "issues of the genocide of the Belarusian people" were mandated.

According to education specialist Andrei Lavrukhin, the introduction of these manuals is an attempt by the authorities to disavow accusations from democratic countries regarding crimes against the Belarusian and Ukrainian peoples through the rhetorical strategy of tu quoque.

== In culture ==
Across all museums in the country, even non-historical ones, exhibits on the "Genocide of the Belarusian people" were established. These exhibits typically feature photographs of World War II collaborators placed directly alongside pictures showing the white-red-white flags from the 2020 protests.

At the ancestral estate of Tadeusz Kościuszko in Malyja Siachnovičy, the local Zhabinka district historical museum (originally created to honor the national hero of three countries) was completely altered in February 2022. The hall dedicated to Kościuszko was removed, and in its place, an exhibition titled "Crimes of Fascism. Genocide of the Belarusian people during the Great Patriotic War" was installed.

== Book series ==
In 2022, the book Genocide of the Belarusian People was published under the general editorship of Prosecutor General Andrei Shved. The initial print run was 1,000 copies, which was increased by another 2,000 copies the following year. In the book, manipulative parallels are drawn between Nazi criminals and participants of the 2020 protests, and the national symbols of Belarusians—the Pahonia coat of arms and the white-red-white flag—are labeled as Nazi symbols.

A second book, Genocide of the Belarusian People: Death Camps, was also published in 2022 with a print run of 3,000 copies, later expanded by another 4,000 copies. In 2023, a two-part volume titled Genocide of the Belarusian People: Punitive Operations was released in 3,000 copies, with an additional 1,500 printed the next year. In 2025, Genocide of the Belarusian People: Crimes of the Executioners of the 118th Punitive Battalion was published in 2,200 copies.

In March 2023, the first two books of the series were awarded the highest prize of the national "Art of the Book" competition in the "Triumph" category.

== Criminal prosecution for denial ==
On 30 October 2024, the Minsk City Court issued the first verdict for denying the genocide of the Belarusian people, sentencing a man to three years in a general-regime penal colony for comments about Khatyn and Lukashenko.

In December 2025, an 18-year-old resident of Mahiliou was arrested. According to the prosecutor's office, in September 2024, acting as an administrator in a public Telegram chat, he posted a comment "denying well-known historical facts, in particular, the systematic destruction of the population of the BSSR by the German fascist invaders and their accomplices during the Great Patriotic War, and the very existence of Nazi Germany's Generalplan Ost." His actions were classified under Part 1 of Article 130-2 of the Criminal Code of the Republic of Belarus.
