= Torture in Belarus =

Torture in Belarus became a widespread and systematic practice by the security forces of the Lukashenko regime following the presidential election in August 2020 and the outbreak of large-scale peaceful protests. International human rights organizations such as Amnesty International and Human Rights Watch, as well as UN bodies, have repeatedly stated the endemic nature of the cruel, inhuman, and degrading treatment of political prisoners and detained citizens.

In 2024, the UN Committee Against Torture published a report concluding undeniably that the use of torture is a systematic state practice in Belarus. These actions by security forces, who enjoy complete impunity, can be classified as crimes against humanity.

== Conditions of detention and methods of abuse ==
According to documented evidence from human rights organizations, in particular the Viasna Human Rights Centre and the Belarusian Helsinki Committee, the authorities deliberately create discriminatory and unbearable conditions for those convicted on political grounds and detained for exercising their civil rights. In penal colonies, the clothing of political prisoners is marked with special yellow tags. In remand prisons and temporary detention centers—most notably the Okrestina detention centre in Minsk and the prison in Zhodzina—unsanitary conditions and overcrowding are artificially created. There have been numerous documented cases where up to thirty detainees were placed in cells designed for four people. To intentionally worsen conditions, homeless people with infectious diseases and parasites such as lice and bedbugs were deliberately placed into these cells.

Among the main methods of physical and psychological abuse used by security forces from GUBOPiK, OMON, the KGB, and prison administrations are severe beatings during arrests and interrogations, the use of electroshock weapons, and holding detainees in stress positions. In isolation cells, a common practice involves pouring chlorine on the floor, leading to poisoning and asphyxiation of detainees. Detainees are systematically subjected to sleep deprivation and kept in cold temperatures: they are denied mattresses, pillows, and bed linen, and forced to sleep on bare metal bunk beds or the freezing floor. The light in the cells is kept on 24 hours a day, and at night detainees are woken every two hours for roll calls. In the autumn-winter period, people are often denied warm clothing.

This is compounded by psychological abuse, which since 2020 has taken the form of so-called digital torture, including the recording of forced confession videos. Under the threat of physical violence, people are forced to incriminate themselves on camera, after which the videos, along with personal information such as income levels or sexual orientation, are published on pro-government Telegram channels. Cases of denial of medical care, even in acute conditions, have also been recorded, along with threats of sexual violence using police batons. Some political prisoners, such as Yury Kavaliou, were sent for forced psychiatric treatment as a measure of punitive psychiatry.

== Incommunicado and enforced disappearances ==
Since early 2023, Belarusian authorities have widely used the practice of total isolation (incommunicado) of key opposition figures. For over a year, there has been no communication—no letters, phone calls, or visits from lawyers or relatives—with politicians and activists such as Maria Kalesnikava, Sergei Tikhanovsky, Viktar Babaryka, Mikola Statkevich, Maxim Znak and Ihar Losik. The UN Special Rapporteur on Belarus Anaïs Marin and international human rights organizations note that such prolonged isolation is a form of torture and can amount to an enforced disappearance.

== Notable cases ==
A number of specific cases illustrate the overall human rights situation in the Belarusian penitentiary system. For example, opposition leader and vlogger Sergei Tikhanovsky, who was held in solitary confinement and a punishment cell for several consecutive years, reported losing about 56 kilograms of weight after his release in 2025. According to him, prison guards created unbearable cold in the punishment cells, causing him to bleed from his mouth and nose, suffer from seizures, and face regular death threats. Tikhanovsky explicitly characterized these conditions as torture.

Another prominent political prisoner, Maria Kalesnikava, was held in Women's Penal Colony No. 4 in Gomel. After being kept in a freezing punishment cell in November 2022, she was admitted to intensive care with a perforated ulcer. Despite her severe condition following surgery, she was soon returned to the colony and forced to work in a garment factory. She was deprived of contact with her family for over 600 days until her father was permitted a brief visit in November 2024.

Human rights defender Nasta Loika, who has been subjected to repeated arbitrary arrests, was taken by detention center staff to an inner courtyard without warm clothing in November 2022 and left in the freezing cold for eight hours, leading to a serious illness. Additionally, during interrogations, GUBOPiK officers used an electroshock weapon against her. In mid-March 2026, she was released along with many other political prisoners. Political prisoner Katsiaryna Novikava, who managed to secretly smuggle out letters written on scraps of toilet paper, described regular beatings by security forces, reporting that she was struck on the head by everyone present in the office. After falling from the top bunk of her bed and hitting her head on a wooden shelf, she was denied any medical assistance by the administration.

== Deaths in custody ==
Cruel treatment and the systematic denial of medical care have led to the deaths of several political prisoners. Human rights defenders have recorded at least six such cases since 2020. Among them was social activist Vitold Ashurak, who died in May 2021. A released video from the penal colony showed him extremely emaciated and barely able to stand. Well-known artist Ales Pushkin died in July 2023 due to the failure to provide timely medical assistance for a perforated ulcer. Also in 2024, Vadzim Khrasko and Ihar Lednik died; both had serious chronic health problems that were well known to prison administrations but did not receive proper treatment. In none of these cases have the authorities conducted an independent investigation or published autopsy results, which, according to UN representatives, creates a presumption of arbitrary deprivation of life by the state.

== Impunity of security forces ==
Despite thousands of documented testimonies and over 900 official complaints of torture and ill-treatment filed by citizens immediately after August 2020, the Investigative Committee of Belarus has not initiated a single criminal case against police officers or other security personnel. Instead, prosecution authorities launched hundreds of criminal cases against the protesters themselves who complained about the violence. The country's leadership openly guaranteed security forces full immunity for actions aimed at suppressing protests and eliminating political dissent.

== Sources ==
- Отчет по результатам мониторинга мест принудительного содержания в Республике Беларусь в 2020-2021 годах [Report on the results of monitoring places of forced detention in the Republic of Belarus in 2020-2021] (Report) (in Russian). Minsk: Viasna Human Rights Centre. 2022.
- Belarus Human Rights Index 2022: Right not to be subjected to torture, cruel, inhuman or degrading treatment or punishment (PDF) (Report). Belarusian Helsinki Committee. 2022.
- Belarus 2024 Human Rights Report (PDF) (Report). United States Department of State, Bureau of Democracy, Human Rights, and Labor. 2024.
