= Commission on Return =

The Commission for the Consideration of Appeals from Citizens of the Republic of Belarus Located Abroad on Issues of the Commission of Offenses by Them (unofficially known as the Commission on Return; Belarusian: Камісія па разглядзе зваротаў грамадзян Рэспублікі Беларусь, якія знаходзяцца за мяжой, па пытаннях здзяйснення імі правапарушэнняў, Russian: Комиссия по рассмотрению обращений находящихся за рубежом граждан Республики Беларусь по вопросам совершения ими правонарушений) is a state collegial body in Belarus created by the decree of Aleksandr Lukashenko No. 25 on February 6, 2023. The official stated purpose of the commission is to facilitate the repatriation of citizens who left the country after the 2020 political crisis and fear criminal or administrative persecution.

The commission is headed by the Prosecutor General Andrei Shved. Its members include the heads of security agencies, representatives of state media, and public organizations. Human rights defenders and independent lawyers strongly criticize the commission's activities, pointing to the lack of legal safety guarantees for those who choose to return.

== Legal regulation and powers ==
The commission was created by Presidential Decree No. 25 "On the consideration of appeals of citizens of the Republic of Belarus located abroad on issues of the commission of offenses by them."

According to the document, citizens who committed offenses related to socio-political events between January 1, 2020, and the time of their appeal, and who wish to return to Belarus, can apply to the commission. The mandatory conditions for the appeal include:

- genuine repentance for what was done;
- readiness to make a public apology;
- readiness to compensate for the damage caused;
- a pledge to uphold the Constitution of Belarus and respect state symbols.

Following the review, the commission may decide to inform the citizen about the absence of claims from security agencies or recommend changing the preventive measure to a more lenient one. However, the final procedural decision strictly remains with the investigative authorities and the courts.

Initially, the term of the commission's work was limited to December 31, 2023, but it was later extended. On October 17, 2024, Aleksandr Lukashenko signed Decree No. 397, which made the commission's activities permanent. Additionally, by Lukashenko's personal order, the commission was granted the right to consider appeals from citizens located not only abroad but also within the territory of Belarus.

== Composition ==
The commission consists of about 30 people, including the heads of security structures, deputies, representatives of state media, and pro-government public associations.

- Chairman: Andrei Shved (Prosecutor General).
- Deputy Chairmen: Valery Haidukevich and Aliaksei Stuk.
- Members of the commission:
  - Security bloc: Ivan Kubrakou (Ministry of Internal Affairs), Ivan Tertel (KGB), Dzmitry Hara (Investigative Committee), Anatol Lapo (State Border Committee).
  - State propagandists and media managers: Ryhor Azaronak, Andrei Mukavozchyk, Vadzim Hihin, Marat Markau, Ivan Ejsmant.
  - Other notable figures: Sergei Aleinik (MFA), Dzmitry Baskau (member of the Council of the Republic), Yury Vaskrasenski (political analyst), Volha Shpileuskaya (Belarusian Women's Union).

In August 2025, former presidential candidate Hanna Kanapatskaya was included in the commission.

== Results of activity ==
According to data from the Prosecutor General's Office, as of October 2025, the commission had received 323 appeals, of which 70 were considered on their merits. About 30 applicants received a positive decision, and effectively 30 people returned to Belarus (as of October 2025).

Among those who returned or received permission to resume their professional activities were football players Stanislaw Drahun and Andrey Khachaturyan, whom the commission allowed to return to professional sports. State media also reported an appeal to the commission from political activist Uladzimir Usier (Lazarau), but he passed away in exile before receiving an answer.

== Criticism ==
The commission's activities have been widely criticized for legal uncertainty. Independent lawyers note that the commission's decisions have no imperative power over investigative bodies and courts, and security guarantees depend entirely on the personal decision of the Prosecutor General. Human rights defenders have documented cases where citizens who returned to Belarus (including after communicating with security forces) were detained and sentenced under criminal articles. A well-known case is that of Aliaksandr Kulikou, who returned under guarantees of not being taken into custody, but was ultimately sentenced to imprisonment.

It has also been noted that the authorities practice psychological pressure on the relatives of political emigrants remaining in Belarus to force the exiles to appeal to the commission.

== See also ==
- 2020–2021 Belarusian protests
- Political repression in Belarus
