= Siarhei Kavalenka =

Belarusian dissident

- Сяргей Каваленка
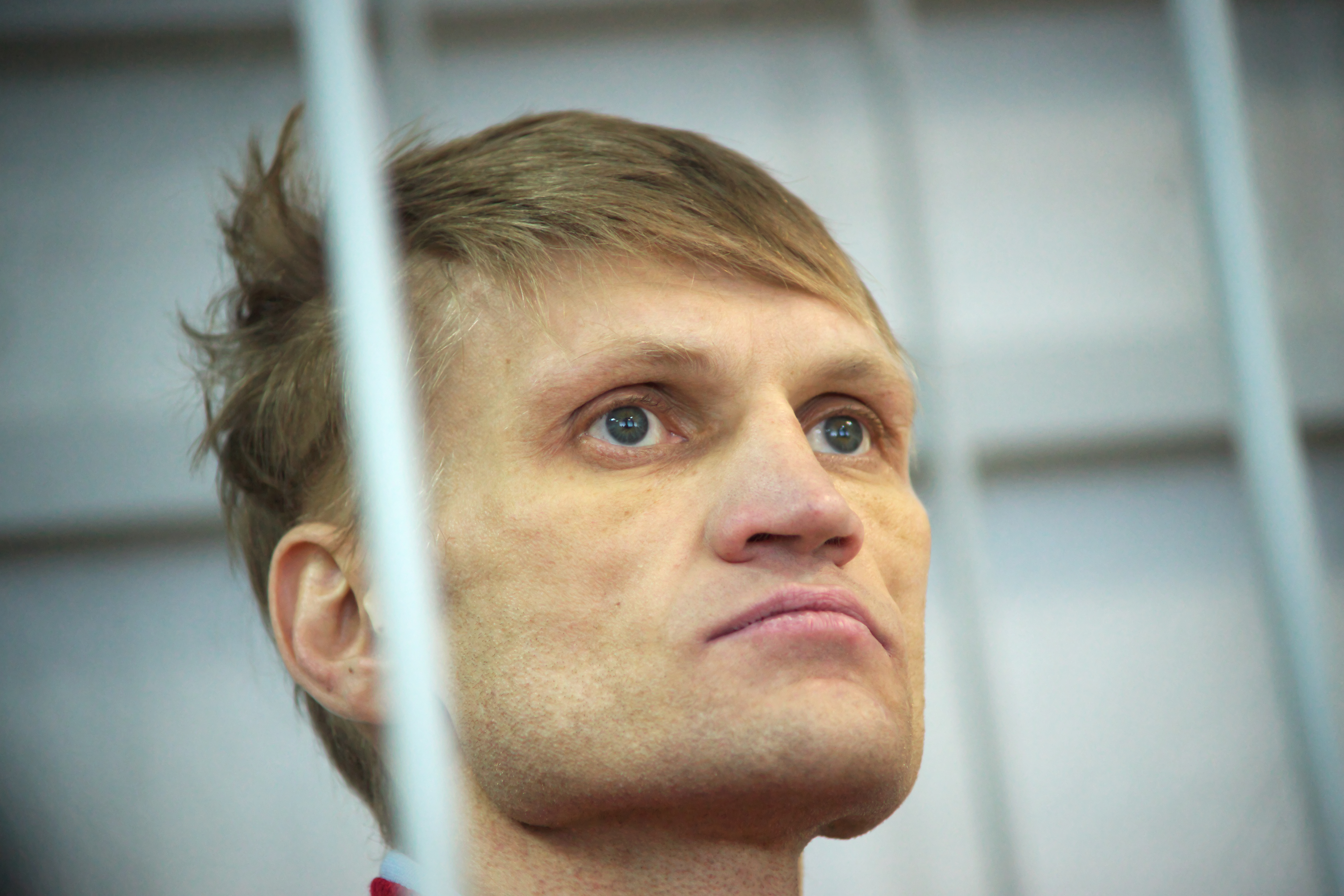
- Born: 16 January 1975; Vitebsk, BSSR
- Citizenship: Belarus
- Occupation: political activist
- Political party: Conservative Christian Party
- Children: 2

Siarhei Aljaksandravič Kavalenka (Belarusian: Сяргей Аляксандравіч Каваленка, born 16 January 1975) is a Belarusian political activist and member of the Conservative Christian Party sentenced for 2 years in prison after placing a white-red-white flag (i.e. the former Belarusian flag) on top of a Christmas tree in Vitebsk in 2010.

== Flag placing in Vitsebsk ==
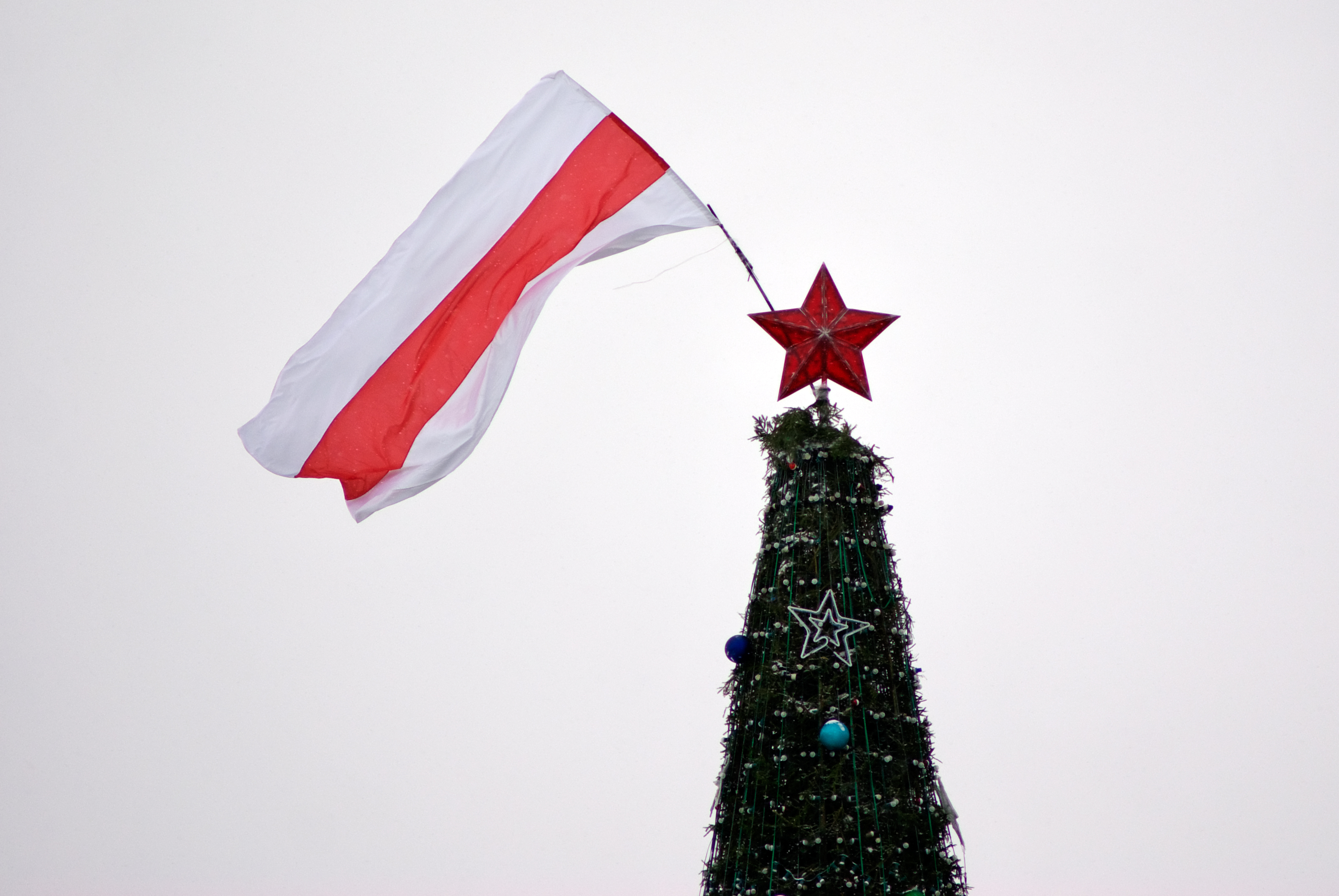
White-red-white flag placed by Siarhei Kavalenka on top of a Christmas tree in Vitsebsk.

On January 7, 2010, Kavalenka climbed atop a Christmas tree in the centre of his native Vitsebsk and placed the historical Belarusian white-red-white banner on top of it. The white-red-white banner has been used by the Belarusian independence and pro-democracy movement since 1917 and was the official flag of Belarus in 1918 and from 1991 to 1995. It is now widely used as a symbol of the opposition to president Alexander Lukashenko.

The court gave Kavalenka three years of suspended sentence. The trial got wide coverage in independent Belarusian media. Human rights groups stated that the court's decision was politically motivated. Nasha Niva, a major independent newspaper, placed Siarhey Kavalenka among the most notable people of Belarus in 2010 as the Hero of the Year.

== Prison sentence ==
In late 2011 Kavalenka was again arrested and accused of violating the conditions of his suspended sentence. As a protest against the arrest, on 19 December 2010 he started a hunger strike. The hunger strike was interrupted by force-feeding on 16 January 2012.

On February 24 Kavalenka was sentenced to 25 months of prison by judge Elena Zhuk and prosecutor Dmitry Lutov.

After being released from prison in 2013, he moved to Poland.

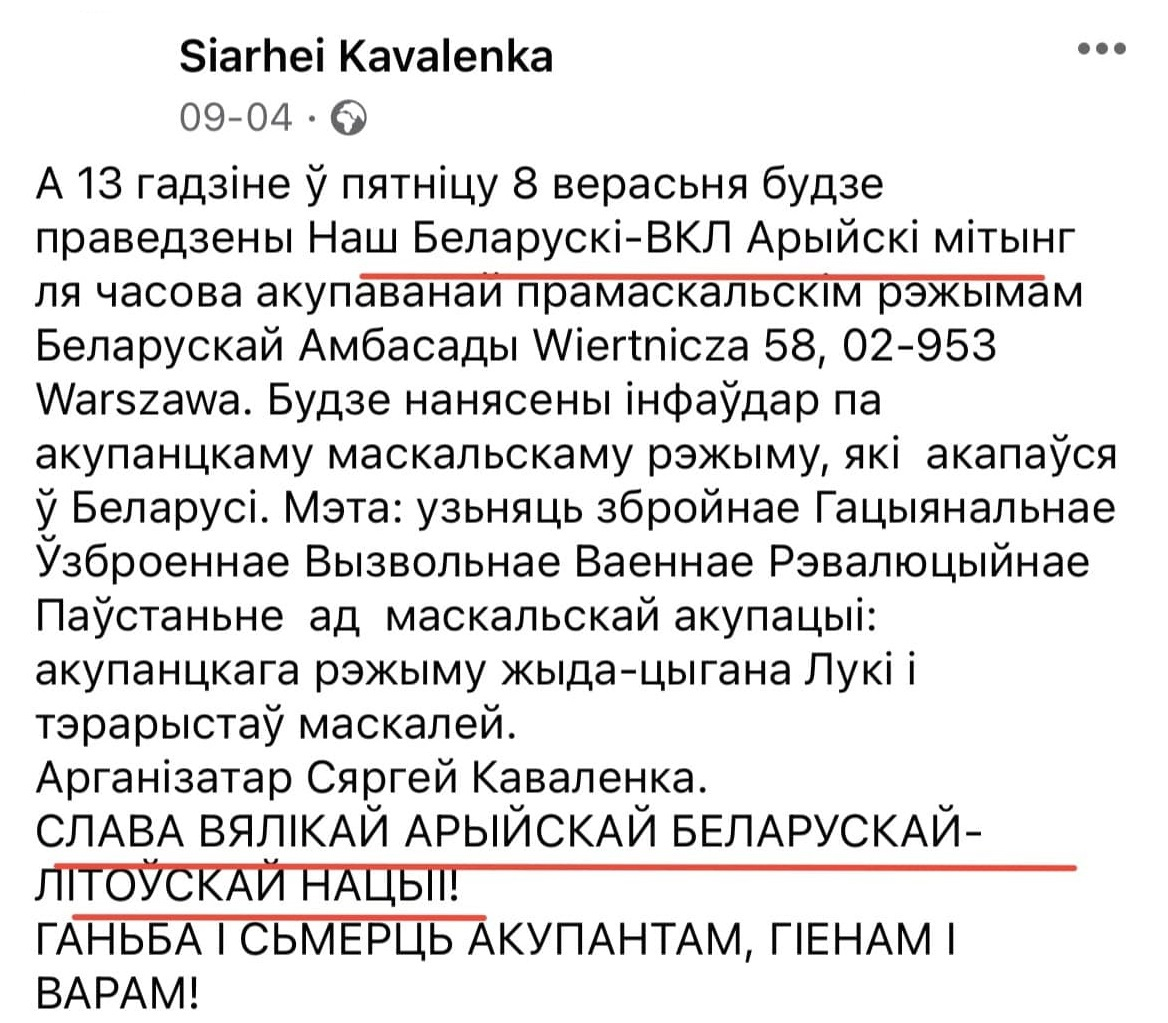
Kavalenka wishes glory to the great Aryan Belarusian–Lithuanian nation

== See also ==
- Hunger-striking opposition activist Kavalenka gets married in Vitsyebsk jail
- Syarhei Kavalenka fell unconscious at court (Photo, video)
- Brawl during trial over Kavalenka (Photo, video)
- Free Belarus Now! on Siarhei Kavalenka
