= Outing =

Disclosing an LGBTQ person's identity without their consent

Outing is the act of disclosing an LGBTQ person's sexual orientation or gender identity without their consent. It is often done for malicious reasons either to instrumentalize homophobia, biphobia or transphobia in order to discredit someone or to combat homophobia, heterosexism or cissexism by revealing that a prominent or respected individual is homosexual or transgender. Historical examples of outing include the Krupp affair, the Eulenburg affair, the Röhm scandal, George Michael's April 1998 arrest, Ricky Martin's 2000 interview with Barbara Walters, and the Larry Craig scandal.

Generally, outing someone in a personal context is thought to be unethical and tends to be frowned upon. When it comes to public figures, the ethics of outing are highly contested as it can often have a negative effect on the target's personal life or career. Some LGBTQ activists argue that gay individuals who oppose LGBTQ rights do not enjoy a right to privacy because of their perceived hypocrisy. In an attempt to pre-empt being outed, an LGBTQ public figure may decide to come out publicly first, although controlling the conditions under which one's LGBTQ identity is revealed is only one of the numerous motives for coming out.

== Terminology ==
It is hard to pinpoint the first use of outing in the modern sense. In a 1982 issue of Harper's, Taylor Branch predicted that "outage" would become a political tactic in which the closeted would find themselves trapped in a crossfire. The article "Forcing Gays Out of the Closet" by William A. Henry III in Time (January 29, 1990) introduced the term "outing" to the general public.

== History ==
The Eulenburg affair of 1907–1909 was the first public outing scandal of the twentieth century. Left-wing journalists opposed to Kaiser Wilhelm II's policies outed a number of prominent members of his cabinet and inner circle — and by implication the Kaiser — beginning with Maximilian Harden's indictment of the aristocratic diplomat Prince Eulenburg. Harden's accusations incited other journalists to follow suit, including Adolf Brand, founder of Der Eigene. Many activists of the first homosexual movement denounced outing as "the way over corpses". In 1928, Kurt Hiller argued that it would be permissible to out a member of a cabinet preparing an anti-homosexual law, arguing: "Our solidarity with the homosexuals of all classes and political viewpoints extends very far; but it does not include traitors to their own cause."

Left-wing journalists outed Adolf Hitler's closest ally Ernst Röhm in 1931 and 1932. In response, Brand wrote, "when someone — as teacher, priest, representative, or statesman — would like to set in the most damaging way the intimate love contacts of others under degrading control — in that moment his own love-life also ceases to be a private matter and forfeits every claim to remain protected hence-forward from public scrutiny and suspicious oversight." Left-wing journalist Kurt Tucholsky disagreed, writing in Die Weltbühne, "We fight the scandalous §175, everywhere we can, therefore we must not join the choir of those among us who want to banish a man from society because he is homosexual."

=== United States ===
In the 1950s during the Lavender Scare, tabloid publications like Confidential emerged, specializing in the revelation of scandalous information about entertainment and political celebrities. Among the political figures targeted by the magazine were former Under Secretary of State Sumner Welles and Arthur H. Vandenberg Jr., who had briefly served as President Eisenhower's Appointments Secretary.

Outing may be found to be libel by a court of law. For example, quite paradoxically, in 1957, American pianist Liberace successfully sued the Daily Mirror for merely insinuating that he was gay. The newspaper responded that columnist William Connor's words (written under his byline 'Cassandra') did not imply that Liberace was gay. Their defence contended that there was no libel as no accusation had been made, rather than arguing that the accusation was true. Following Liberace's death from an AIDS-related illness in 1987, the paper asked for the award to be refunded. In a 2011 interview, actress and close friend Betty White stated that Liberace was gay, and that she often served as a beard to counter rumors of the musician's homosexuality.

I outed Rosie and Ellen, and it's hard to even imagine now that they ever were in the closet. You have to educate the new people and say, 'Guess what, they were in the closet at one point.' It's hard to believe that Rosie was doing this delicate dance on her talk show where she was the 'Queen of Nice' and the single mother who had a crush on Tom Cruise and I was pointing out the absurdity of it.

— Michael Musto, one of the original journalists outing celebrities.

After the Stonewall riots of 1969, gay-liberationists came out in the 1970s, crying out: "Out of the closets, Into the streets!"

Oliver Sipple, who helped save the life of United States President Gerald Ford during an assassination attempt, was outed by gay activists, most prominently Harvey Milk. The negative impact the outing had on Sipple's life later provoked opposition.

Some political conservatives opposed to increased public acceptance of homosexuality engaged in outing in this period as well, with the goal of embarrassing or discrediting their ideological foes. Conservative commentator Dinesh D'Souza, for example, published the letters of gay fellow students at Dartmouth College in the campus newspaper he edited (The Dartmouth Review) in 1981; a few years later, succeeding Review editor Laura Ingraham had a meeting of a campus gay organization secretly tape-recorded, then published a transcript along with attendees' names as part of an editorial denouncing the group as "cheerleaders for latent campus sodomites".

In the 1980s, the AIDS pandemic led to the outing of several major entertainers, including Rock Hudson.

One of the first outings by an activist in the United States occurred in February 1989. Michael Petrelis, along with a few others, alleged that Mark Hatfield, a Republican Senator from Oregon, was gay. They did this because he supported homophobic legislation such as the Helms Amendment. At a fundraiser in a small town outside of Portland, the group stood up and outed him in front of the crowd. Petrelis later tried to make news by standing on the U.S. Capitol steps and reading the names of "twelve men and women in politics and music who ... are secretly gay". Though the press showed up, no major news organization published the story. Potential libel suits deterred publishers.

Michelangelo Signorile, an editor of OutWeek, outed the recently deceased Malcolm Forbes in March 1990. His column "Gossip Watch" became a hot spot for outing the rich and famous. Both praised and lambasted for his behavior, he garnered responses to his actions as wide-ranging as "one of the greater contemporary gay heroes," to "revolting, infantile, cheap name-calling".

Other people who have been outed include Fannie Flagg, Pete Williams, Chaz Bono, Richard Chamberlain, and Sherman Hemsley.

In 2004, gay rights activist Michael Rogers outed Edward Schrock, a Republican Congressman from Virginia. Rogers posted a story on his website alleging that Schrock used an interactive phone sex service to meet other men for sex. Schrock did not deny this, and announced on August 30, 2004, that he would not seek re-election. Rogers said that he outed Schrock to punish him for his hypocrisy in voting for the Marriage Protection Act and signing on as a co-sponsor of the Federal Marriage Amendment.

New Jersey Governor Jim McGreevey announced that he was a "gay American" in August 2004. McGreevey had become aware that he was about to be named in a sexual harassment suit by Golan Cipel, his former security advisor, with whom it was alleged McGreevey had a sexual relationship. McGreevey resigned, but unlike Schrock, McGreevey decided not to step out of public life. John McCain's Presidential Campaign removed images of Alabama Attorney General Troy King from its website after he was outed in 2008.

Some activists argue that outing is appropriate and legitimate in some cases — for example, if the individual is actively working against LGBTQ rights. United States Congressman Barney Frank argued during the 2006 Mark Foley scandal, "I think there's a right to privacy. But the right to privacy should not be a right to hypocrisy. And people who want to demonize other people shouldn't then be able to go home and close the door and do it themselves."

==== Outrage film ====
In 2009, Kirby Dick's documentary Outrage argued that several American political figures have led closeted gay lives while supporting and endorsing legislation that is harmful to the gay community. The film was based on the work of Michael Rogers and BlogActive.com. The film focused particular attention on Idaho Senator Larry Craig, an outspoken opponent of gay rights who in 2007 pleaded guilty to disorderly conduct for soliciting sex from an undercover police officer in a public bathroom. Outrage featured interviews with several people who claim that Governor of Florida Charlie Crist has led a private gay life while publicly opposing gay marriage and gay adoption.

Other politicians discussed in the film include former Virginia Representative Ed Schrock, California Representative David Dreier, former New York City mayor Ed Koch, and former Louisiana Representative Jim McCrery.

The film argues that the mass media is reluctant to discuss issues involving gay politicians despite the many comparable news stories about heterosexual politicians and scandals. Outrage describes this behavior as a form of institutionalized homophobia that has resulted in a tacit policy of self-censorship when reporting on these issues.

=== Japan ===
In April 2015, a student attending Hitotsubashi University Law School privately came out as gay and confessed his love to a friend of his. The friend, declining the student's advances, would out him two months later to a group chat of ten people, citing anxiety and insomnia diagnoses that had allegedly resulted from the confession. The consequences of this led to the student developing a panic disorder; on August 24, the student experienced a panic attack during a mock trial and inadvertently fell to his death shortly after medical personnel arrived. A civil lawsuit by the student's family against his friend was settled out of court in 2018 on undisclosed terms, while claims they made against the university were dismissed due to their lack of direct responsibility and the unforeseen nature of the student's death.

== Motives ==
Gabriel Rotello, once editor of OutWeek, explained outing as "equalizing", stating: "what we have called 'outing' is a primarily journalistic movement to treat homosexuality as equal to heterosexuality in the media".

Signorile described OutWeek's aim as an awareness raiser of the presence of gay people and political issues. The goal would be that being gay and lesbian is not "so utterly grotesque that it should never be discussed". (Signorile, p. 78) Signorile posits that outing is not the airing of private details.

Richard Mohr noted, "Some people have compared outing to McCarthyism..such outing feeds gays to the wolves, who thereby are made stronger....But the sort of outing I have advocated does not invoke, mobilize, or ritualistically confirm anti-gay values; rather it cuts against them." Thus Mohr argues that outing is "both permissible and an expected consequence of living morally".

In the context of Ali Fazeli Monfared's murder, Tara Far, a human rights investigator in Iran and Kuwait, has described outing as "dangerous" within societies where the LGBTQ community is not protected by law, or families that do not accept the individual. Shadi Amin described the military exemption card as a danger to Monfared in her petition to the Iranian government to remove the sexuality information.

There is no widely agreed definition of "fair outing". Warren Johansson and William Percy describe least four intermediate positions have been described to justify outing:

1. Only the dead;
2. Hypocrites only, and only when they actively oppose gay rights and interests;
3. Outing passive accomplices who help run homophobic institutions;
4. Prominent individuals whose outing would shatter stereotypes and compel the public to reconsider its attitude on homosexuality.

Assessing to which degree the outer goes allows insight into the goal striven towards. Most outers target those who support decisions and further policy, both religious and secular, which discriminate against gay people while they themselves live a clandestine gay existence. A "truism to people active in the gay movement [is] that the greatest impediments to homosexuals' progress often [are] not heterosexuals, but closeted homosexuals," said San Francisco journalist Randy Shilts.

British activist Peter Tatchell says "The lesbian and gay community has a right to defend itself against public figures who abuse their power and influence to support policies which inflict suffering on homosexuals." In 1994 Tatchell's activist group OutRage! alleged that fourteen bishops of the Church of England were homosexual or bisexual and named them, accusing them of hypocrisy for upholding the Church's policy of regarding homosexual acts as sinful while not observing this prohibition in their personal lives. "Outing is queer self-defence," Tatchell said in a 1995 speech to the Lesbian and Gay Christian Movement conference. "Lesbians and gay men have a right, and a duty, to expose hypocrites and homophobes. By not outing gay Bishops who support policies which harm homosexuals, we would be protecting those Bishops and thereby allowing them to continue to inflict suffering on members of our community. Collusion with hypocrisy and homophobia is not ethically defensible for Christians, or for anyone else."

== Outing as a form of political repression ==
=== Belarus ===
In Belarus, forced outing has been used as a tool of political repression, especially following the 2020–2021 Belarusian protests. Individuals detained for their alleged political activity have been coerced into participating in so-called "forced confession videos", where they are made to disclose personal details under duress, including their sexual orientation.

In some instances, gay men were forced not only to out themselves on camera but also to reveal the names of their partners. These videos were disseminated through pro-government Telegram channels and, later, on state television. The outing was frequently combined with other forms of humiliation, including forced disclosures of psychiatric diagnoses, labeling individuals with opposition symbols like the white-red-white flag, and emphasizing stigmatized characteristics such as mental health status, body type, or social status.

Such actions have been condemned by human rights organizations as violations of privacy, human dignity, and international norms prohibiting inhuman or degrading treatment.

== Impact and effectiveness ==
Signorile argues that the outing of journalist Pete Williams "and its aftermath did indeed make a big dent in the military's policy against gays. The publicity generated put the policy on the front burner in 1992, thrusting the issue into the presidential campaign," with every Democratic candidate and independent Ross Perot publicly promising to end the ban.

== Outing in the military ==
The military forces of the world have differing approaches to the enlistment of homosexual and bisexual individuals. Some have open policies, others prohibit, and some are ambiguous. The armed forces of most developed countries have now removed policies excluding non-heterosexual individuals (with strict policies on sexual harassment).

Nations that permit gay people to serve openly in the military include 3 of the 5 permanent members of the UN Security Council (United States, United Kingdom and France), the Republic of China (Taiwan), Australia, Israel, Argentina, and all NATO members except Turkey.

In the United Kingdom, the Ministry of Defence policy since the year 2000 is to allow gay men, lesbians and transgender personnel to serve openly, and discrimination on a sexual orientation basis is forbidden. It is also forbidden for someone to pressure LGBTQ people to come out.

In the United States, lesbian, gay, and bisexual people are allowed to serve openly in the United States military. As of 2021, transgender individuals are allowed to serve openly, and to transition during their service. The Trump administration however has taken steps to exclude trans people from the military in 2025. Those attempts are currently being litigated in US courts. Military policy and legislation had previously entirely prohibited gay individuals from serving, and subsequently from serving openly, but these prohibitions were ended in September 2011 after the United States Congress voted to repeal the policy. The first time homosexuals were differentiated from non-homosexuals in the military literature was in revised army mobilization regulations in 1942. Additional policy revisions in 1944 and 1947 further codified the ban. Throughout the next few decades, homosexuals were routinely discharged, regardless of whether they had engaged in sexual conduct while serving. In response to the gay rights movements of the 1970s and 1980s, the Department of Defense issued a 1982 policy (DOD Directive 1332.14) stating that homosexuality was clearly incompatible with military service. Controversy over this policy created political pressure to amend the policy, with socially liberal efforts seeking a repeal of the ban and socially conservative groups wishing to reinforce it by statute.

== Criticism ==
Outing can be damaging or life-threatening to those with unsupportive families. In response to a North Carolina bill that could out children to parents under the school system, various mental health experts warned of the potential damage, which could be life-threatening.

After several Moroccans were outed from using gay dating apps, the Human Rights Watch requested that the Moroccan government do more to protect their LGBTQ community, as many of them were facing abuse and discrimination.

Outing is dangerous in various Islamic countries where the LGBTQ community faces discrimination or death from outings, resulting in many LGBTQ refugees to Western countries.

Roger Rosenblatt argued in his January 1993 New York Times Magazine essay "Who Killed Privacy?" that, "The practice of 'outing' homosexuals implies contradictorily that homosexuals have a right to private choice but not to private lives." In March 2002, singer Will Young revealed he was gay, pre-empting a tabloid newspaper (reportedly News of the World) that was preparing to out him.

Christine Jorgensen, Beth Elliott, Renée Richards, Sandy Stone, Billy Tipton, Alan L. Hart, James Barry, April Ashley, Caroline Cossey ("Tula") and Jahna Steele were outed as transgender by European or American media or, in the cases of Billy Tipton and James Barry, posthumously by their coroners. In many cases, being outed had an adverse effect on their personal lives and their careers.

In some cases well-known celebrities have been outed as transgender or intersex when no proof to substantiate the claims was presented, e.g., Jamie Lee Curtis.

== See also ==
- Doxing, revealing generic personally identifiable information through the internet
