= Forced confession videos in Belarus =

Forced “confession” videos in Belarus began appearing on pro-government Telegram channels and state media following the onset of the protests that erupted in August 2020. These videos involve the coerced “confession” of individuals on camera for alleged crimes. Detainees are subjected to outing, fat shaming, stigmatization of their personal traits, and other forms of humiliation. The Information and Public Relations Directorate (VIOS) of the Ministry of Internal Affairs of Belarus (MIA) is reportedly involved in the production of such videos. Coercing individuals to participate in these “confession” videos violates the Constitution of Belarus, the International Covenant on Civil and Political Rights, and the presumption of innocence.

== History ==
The videos, featuring detained Belarusians allegedly repenting for unlawful actions and promising not to repeat them, became a hallmark of the Belarusian authorities’ strategy to suppress political dissent. They spread widely on pro-government Telegram channels and in state media following the presidential election protests in August 2020.

From late 2022, confession videos began appearing in state media. These videos also started to appear in regional outlets. For example, in November 2022, the newspaper ‘‘Avangard’’ of the Buda-Kashalyova district executive committee published a video featuring two rural schoolteachers who were coerced into admitting to subscribing to “extremist” content and urging others to unsubscribe.

In February 2023, a leak from a pro-government Telegram channel revealed that the Information and Public Relations Directorate (VIOS) of the MIA was directly involved in publishing forced confessions. In March 2023, forced confession segments began to air on state television news programs.

That same month, pro-government Telegram channels released 40 “confession” videos featuring detained railway workers. Later, athletes who had signed a letter calling for free elections in 2020 were also coerced into making “confession” videos.

In May 2023, the Instagram account of the Faculty of Law, Belarusian State University published a “confession” video of a student allegedly slandering the faculty administration and the BRSM.

== Content ==
The videos often include detainees stating personal details such as full name and place of work. People are frequently labeled as extremists and radicals due to subscriptions to banned independent media. The narrative typically emphasizes repentance, obedience, and allegiance to Alexander Lukashenko. Messages include admission of naivety and incompetence, professed disinterest in politics, and desire for national prosperity. Many interviews aim to discredit independent media.

Over time, the humiliation intensified. Gay individuals were forced to out themselves and name partners on camera. People under psychiatric care had to disclose their diagnosis. Opposition figures had white-red-white flag stickers placed on their foreheads. Videos increasingly emphasized stigmatized traits, fat shaming, and social disparities between the viewer and the subject. Some featured sex toys allegedly found during searches.

== Filming process ==
Belarusian Twitter blogger Mikhail Tsygankov recounted his experience, stating that he had no choice about participating; he could only influence how badly he would be treated. The video was filmed on a low-budget phone, against a green screen, with multiple retakes if the security forces were unsatisfied.

== Violations of constitutional and international norms ==
The making and broadcasting of such videos violates multiple provisions of the Constitution of Belarus and the International Covenant on Civil and Political Rights. They breach the rights of individuals suspected of crimes, including freedom of expression, which also includes the right not to express opinions on political matters. These videos violate the right not to be subjected to cruel, inhuman, or degrading treatment or torture.

They also violate the presumption of innocence, as individuals are compelled to confess or self-incriminate outside legal proceedings.

== Reactions ==
Dr. Iryna Sidorskaya, former chair of the journalism faculty at Belarusian State University and Doctor of Philology, noted that such videos have nothing to do with journalism. Instead, they are tools of emotional manipulation, public opinion control, and state-sponsored violence.

Psychiatrist Siarhei Papou states that these videos create “witness trauma” and are primarily aimed at viewers rather than the coerced participants. Individuals fear being killed, maimed, or broken, compelling them to recite pre-written statements.
