= Klawdziy Duzh-Dushewski =

Belarusian architect, diplomat and journalist (1891–1959)

Klawdzi Duzh-Dushewski
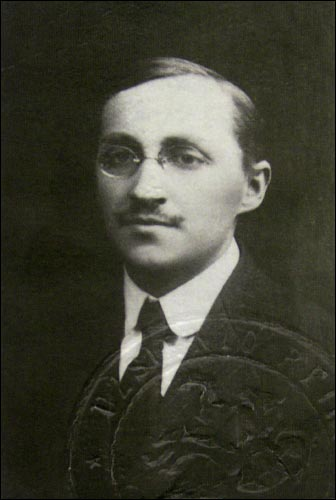
- Born: 27 March 1891; Hlybokaye, Vilna Governorate, Russian Empire
- Died: 25 February 1959 (aged 67); Vilnius, Lithuanian SSR, Soviet Union
- Resting place: Petrašiūnai Cemetery, Kaunas
- Education: Petersburg Mining Institute; Civil Engineer: University of Lithuania (faculty reorganized in Kaunas University of Technology)
- Occupations: civil engineer, architect, diplomat and journalist
- Known for: Designing the first flag of Belarus; Protecting Jews in World War II

The flag of Belarus presumably designed by Duzh-Dushewski

Klawdziy Duzh-Dushewski with Kastus Yezavitaw, December 1919 in Riga

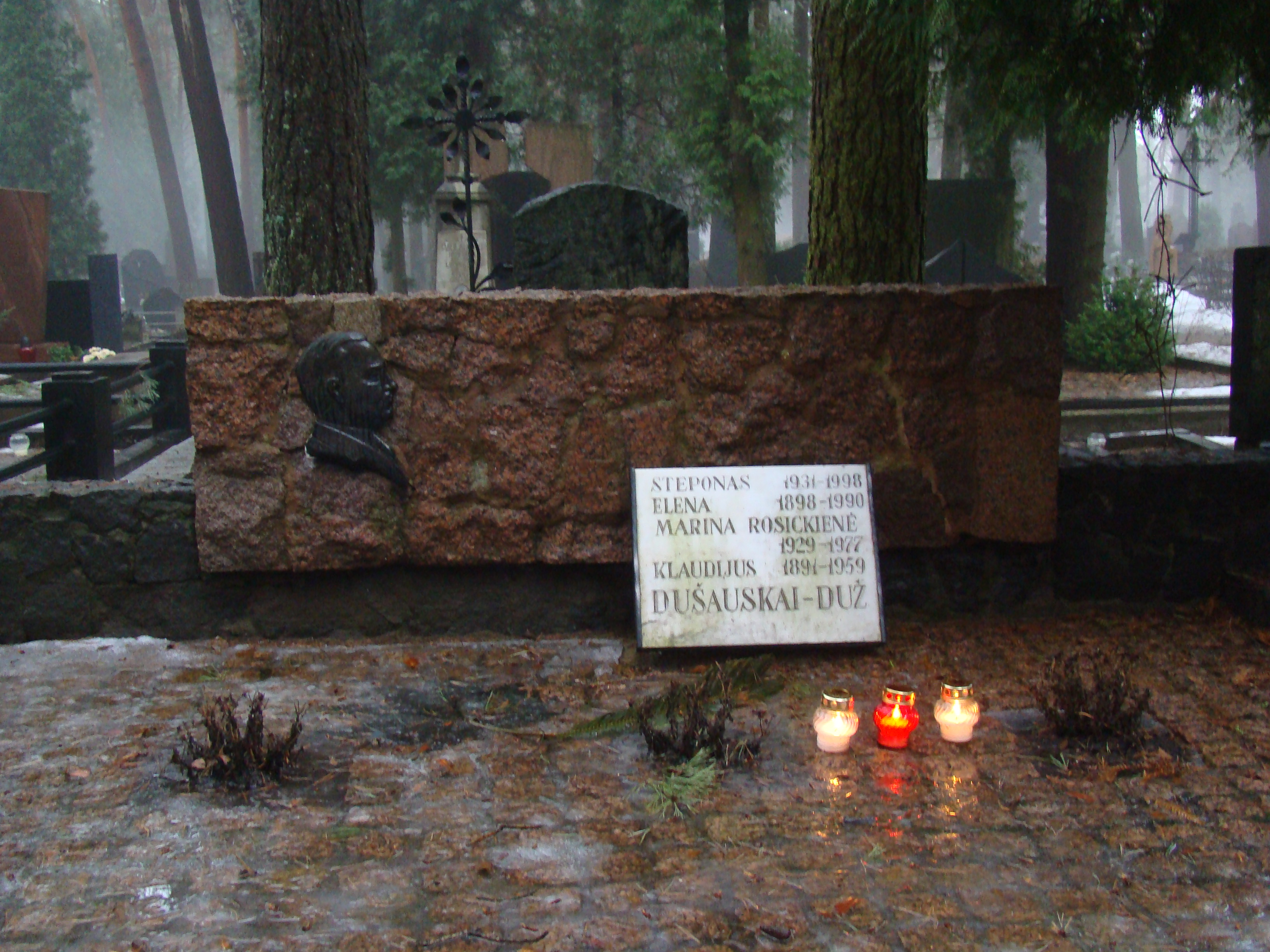
Grave of Klawdziy Duzh-Dushewski in Kaunas

Klawdziy Stsyapanavich Duzh-Dushewski (Belarusian: Клаўдзій Сцяпанавіч Дуж-Душэўскі, Polish: Klaudiusz Duż-Duszewski, Lithuanian: Klaudijus Dušauskas-Duž; 27 March 1891 – 25 February 1959) was a Belarusian civil engineer, architect, diplomat and journalist. He is believed to be the creator of the national flag of Belarus in 1917.

== Life ==
Duzh-Dushewski was born into a Roman Catholic petty noble family in Hlybokaye on 27 March 1891. In 1912, he graduated the Vilnius Real School where he had joined the Belarusian nationalist movement. In 1912–1918 Duzh-Dushewski studied in the Saint Petersburg Mining Institute. Being in St. Petersburg, he also took part in Belarusian social life. For instance, he was editor of the Belarusian magazine Ranica.

In 1917 he joined the Belarusian Socialist Assembly, and a year later Belarusian Party of Socialist Revolutionaries. In 1918 he worked at the Refugee Assistance Department of the Belarusian National Committee in St. Petersburg. At that time, according to his own memories, he created the draft of the white-red-white flag of Belarus that was very quickly adopted by the Belarusian nationalists throughout the European part of the former Russian Empire and later adopted as the state flag of the Belarusian Democratic Republic.

In 1919, he arrived in Vilnius and participated in the pro-Polish Congress of Vilnius and Grodno Regions, where he was elected chairman. He was then chosen as the president of the newly formed Central Belarusian Council of Vilnius and Grodno Regions. On June 20, 1919, eleven days after the Congress, together with Ivan Luckievič and Paweł Aleksiuk, he was received by the Polish Chief of State, Józef Piłsudski, and expressed, on behalf of the Belarusian population, the desire to attach the whole of Belarus to Poland. He met with Piłsudski again in July, where he obtained a promise of assistance in organizing a Belarusian army and a commitment to revoke the decree requiring local government officials in the eastern territories to have mandatory knowledge of the Polish language.

Soon Dushewski resigned from this position. Subsequently, he became involved in Belarusian educational activities. Starting from September 1, 1919, he worked at the Belarusian Gymnasium in Vilnius as a geography teacher.

In 1921 he emigrated to Lithuania and settled in Kaunas, where he joined the government of the Belarusian People's Republic.

In autumn 1919 he was appointed diplomatic representative of the Belarusian Democratic Republic in the Baltic states.

In the 1920s–1930s he worked for several ministries there. In 1927 he graduated from the University of Lithuania in Kaunas as Civil Engineer. He also edited several Belarusian newspapers in Lithuania.

In 1940 he was arrested by the Soviets who occupied Lithuania. In August 1943 he was arrested by the Nazis for hiding Jews. He was put into the Pravieniškės labor camp. On April 13, 2004, Duzh-Dushewski was posthumously awarded the Cross of Rescue of the Perishing by the President of Lithuania. This happened at the request of the Jewish community of Lithuania for his service to the community during the war.

In 1944–1946 he worked at the Kaunas University.

In 1952 he was arrested and sentenced to 25 years of gulag for being an "active Belarusian nationalist". He was freed in 1955 and worked for an architectural institute until his death a few years later.

== Bibliography ==
- Gierowska-Kałłaur, Joanna (2012). ""Depozyty" Walerego Sławka przechowywane w Moskwie". Studia z Dziejów Rosji i Europy Środkowo–Wschodniej (in Polish). XLVII.
- Gierowska-Kałłaur, Joanna (2016). "Postaci czołowych działaczy białoruskich w świetle informacji Urzędu Komisarza Rządu na miasto Wilno w 1924 roku". Studia z Dziejów Rosji i Europy Środkowo–Wschodniej (in Polish). LI (2).
