= State Forensic Examination Committee of the Republic of Belarus =

Belarusian forensic authority

- Государственный комитет судебных экспертиз (ГКСЭ) Республики Беларусь
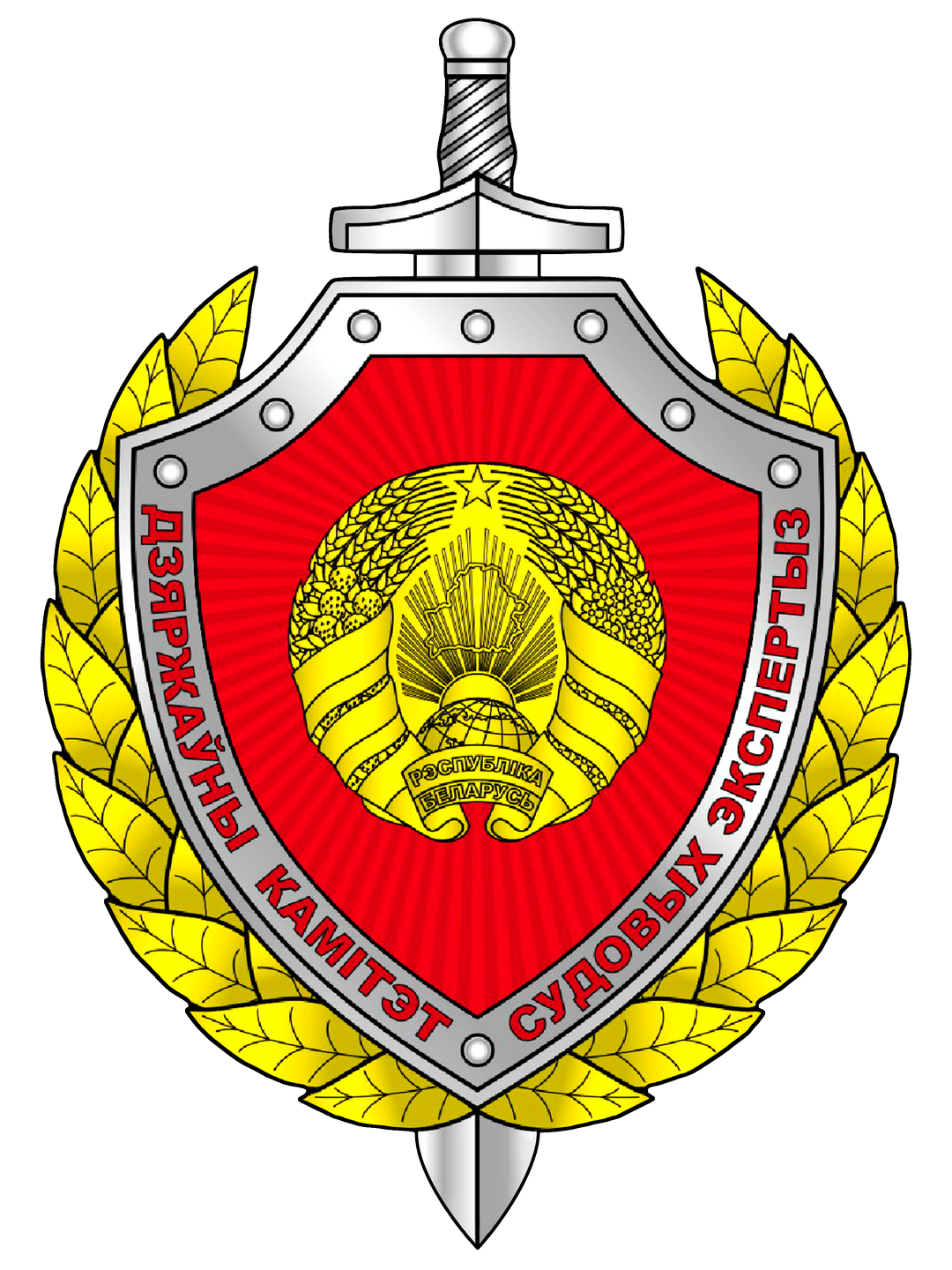
- Emblem of the SFEC of Belarus

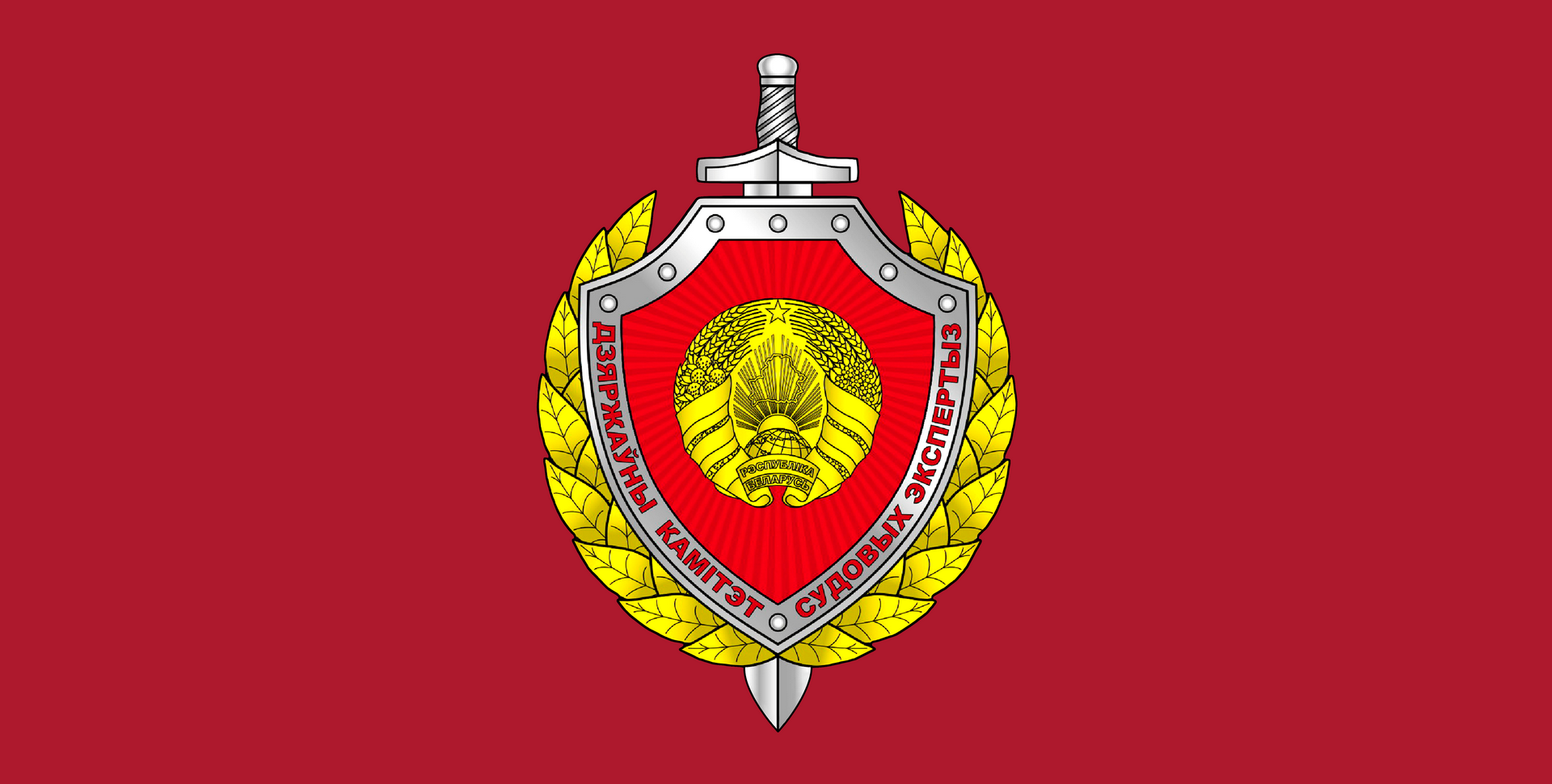
- Flag of the SFEC of Belarus

Special service overview
- Formed: April 22, 2013
- Jurisdiction: Belarus
- Headquarters: Minsk, Belarus
- Special service executive: Andrei Shved, Chairman
- Website: www.sudexpert.gov.by

The State Forensic Examination Committee of the Republic of Belarus (SFEC RB) (Belarusian: Дзяржаўны камітэт судовых экспертыз Рэспублікі Беларусь, romanized: Dziaržaŭny kamitet sudovych ekśpiertyz Respubliki Bielaruś) — is a centralized system of state bodies in Belarus, exercising powers in the field of forensic expert activity in accordance with legislative acts. The structure was created on the basis of the State Service of Medical Forensic Expertise, expert divisions of law enforcement bodies, emergency departments and units, the Armed Forces and expert units of the Ministry of Justice of the Republic of Belarus. Formed on April 22, 2013, began its operations on July 1, 2013. The chairman of the SFEC RB is Andrei Shved.

== History ==
For the first time, the issue of reforming the system of state forensic institutions in the Republic of Belarus was addressed in 1992, but the adoption of the final decision was preceded by a large-scale work. As a result, during the reform of the judicial and expert system, the special procedural status of the expert and the importance of his conclusion for establishing the truth in criminal, administrative, civil and economic cases were placed at the center of the issue.

The basis for the establishment of the State Forensic Examination Committee was:

- expert forensic units of law enforcement bodies;
- The State Service of Medical Forensic Expertise, including its Regional and Minsk Departments;
- State Institution "80 Central Military Forensic Laboratory" of the Ministry of Defense;
- Research and Emergency Situations Expertise Department of the Center for Standardization and Expertise in the Field of Protection of the Population and Territories from Emergency Situations of the Institution “Scientific-Research Institute of Fire Safety and Problems of Emergency Situations” of the Ministry for Emergency Situations, the unit (group) for the operation of the state system for the prevention and liquidation of emergency situations and civil defense, research, expertise of emergency situations and fires of scientific and practical centers of regional (Minsk city) departments of the Ministry of Emergency Situations, department of research and expertise fires institution "Scientific-Research Center of the Vitebsk regional department of the Ministry of Emergency Situations of the Republic of Belarus";
- State institution "Center for Forensic Expertise and Criminalistics of the Ministry of Justice of the Republic of Belarus".

On July 1, 2013 the State Forensic Examination Committee of the Republic of Belarus started functioning. December 19, 2014 The President of the Republic of Belarus, Alexander Lukashenko, presented the banner of the State Forensic Examination Committee to the Chairman of the State Committee.

=== Timeline ===
March 1, 1919 – the Office of Forensic Expertise of the NKVD Centrorozysk was created. This date is considered to be the day of formation of the forensic expert subdivisions of the internal affairs bodies of the RSFSR.

1921 – the first forensic department in the republic was opened at the Central Chemical-Bacteriological Station of the People's Commissar of Health of the BSSR.

1929 – The Institute of Scientific and Forensic Expertise in Minsk (later - Belarusian State Institute of Criminology, Forensic Science and Forensic Expertise, Belarusian State Scientific Research Institute of Criminalistics and Judicial Expertise under the NKVD of the BSSR) was established under the People's Commissariat of Justice.

1930 – The Department of Forensic Medicine was opened in the Belarusian (Minsk) State Medical Institute.

1944 – the Central Forensic Laboratory of the People's Commissariat of Justice of the USSR was established in Moscow, which became the first all-Union forensic expert center.

1950 – in the system of the Ministry of Justice of the BSSR, a forensic research laboratory was established.

1958 – The Scientific Research Institute of Forensic Expertise of the Ministry of Justice of the BSSR was established, which in 1990 was reorganized into the Scientific Research Institute of Problems of Criminology, Criminalistics and Forensic Expertise of the Ministry of Justice of the BSSR.

1977 – the Department of Criminalistics and Special Technique of the Minsk Higher School of the USSR Ministry of Internal Affairs was established.

1981 – the expert-criminalistic service was assigned to the police.

1993 – under the Ministry of Internal Affairs of the Republic of Belarus, the Forensic Science Center was established, which in 1994, together with the Forensic Expertise Department, was transformed into the forensic expert center of the Ministry of Internal Affairs of the Republic of Belarus.

1996 – for the purpose of improving the activity of forensic and expert subdivisions of the internal affairs bodies and increasing their effectiveness in combating crime the Forensic Expert Center of the Ministry of Internal Affairs of the Republic of Belarus was reorganized into the State Forensic Science Center of the Ministry of Internal Affairs of the Republic of Belarus.

1999 – The Main Bureau of the State Forensic Medical Service under the Ministry of Health of the Republic of Belarus, established in 1952, was transformed into the central office of the Belarusian State Forensic Medical Service, which in 2001 was transformed into the State Medical Forensic Examination Service.

2008 – the Scientific Research Institute of Problems of Criminology, Criminalistics and Forensic Expertise of the Ministry of Justice of the Republic of Belarus was renamed into State Institution “Center of forensic expertise and criminology of the Ministry of Justice of the Republic of Belarus”. In 2013 this institution was reassigned to the State Forensic Examination Committee and today it functions as a state institution "Scientific and Practical Center of the State Forensic Examination Committee of the Republic of Belarus".

== About the Committee ==
The main tasks of the State Forensic Examination Committee are:

- implementation of unified state policy in the field of forensic activities, including its scientific and methodological support;
- training, retraining and qualification of experts, researchers and other employees within the competence;
- forensic expert activities;
- determination of the main directions of improving forensic expert activities and their implementation, practical application of science and technology, positive experience, innovative forms and methods of forensic expert studies;
- international cooperation in the field of forensic expert activity organization and development.

== Structure ==
The system of the State Forensic Examination Committee includes the following state bodies:

- Central Office of the State Forensic Examination Committee;
- territorial units of the State Forensic Examination Committee;
- Regional and Minsk-City subdivisions of the State Forensic Examination Committee;
- district (inter-district), city, district (inter-district) in Minsk departments of the State Forensic Examination Committee.

== Guide ==
By the decree of the President of the Republic of Belarus, Andrei Shved was appointed chairman of the State Forensic Examination Committee of the Republic of Belarus.

- Deputy Chairman of the SFEC RB — Major General of Justice Maxim Voronin.
- Deputy Chairman of the SFEC RB – Chief State Forensic Medical Expert of the Republic of Belarus — Yurii Ovsiyuk.
- Deputy Chairman of the SFEC RB — Major General of Justice Sergei Yevmenenko.
- Deputy Chairman of the SFEC RB — Major General of Justice Petr Vrublevskii.

== Symbols ==
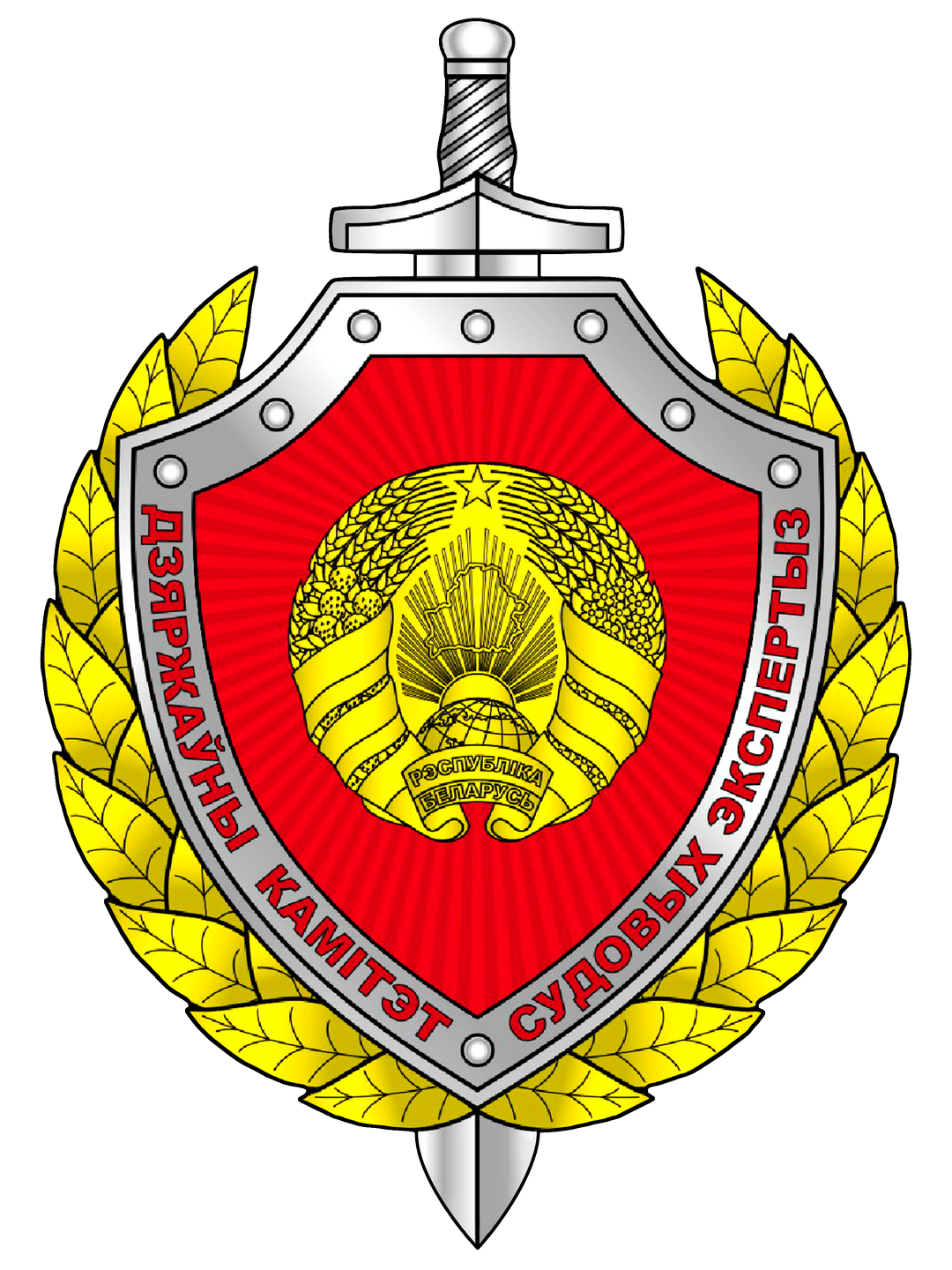
The emblem of the State Forensic Examination Committee of the Republic of Belarus

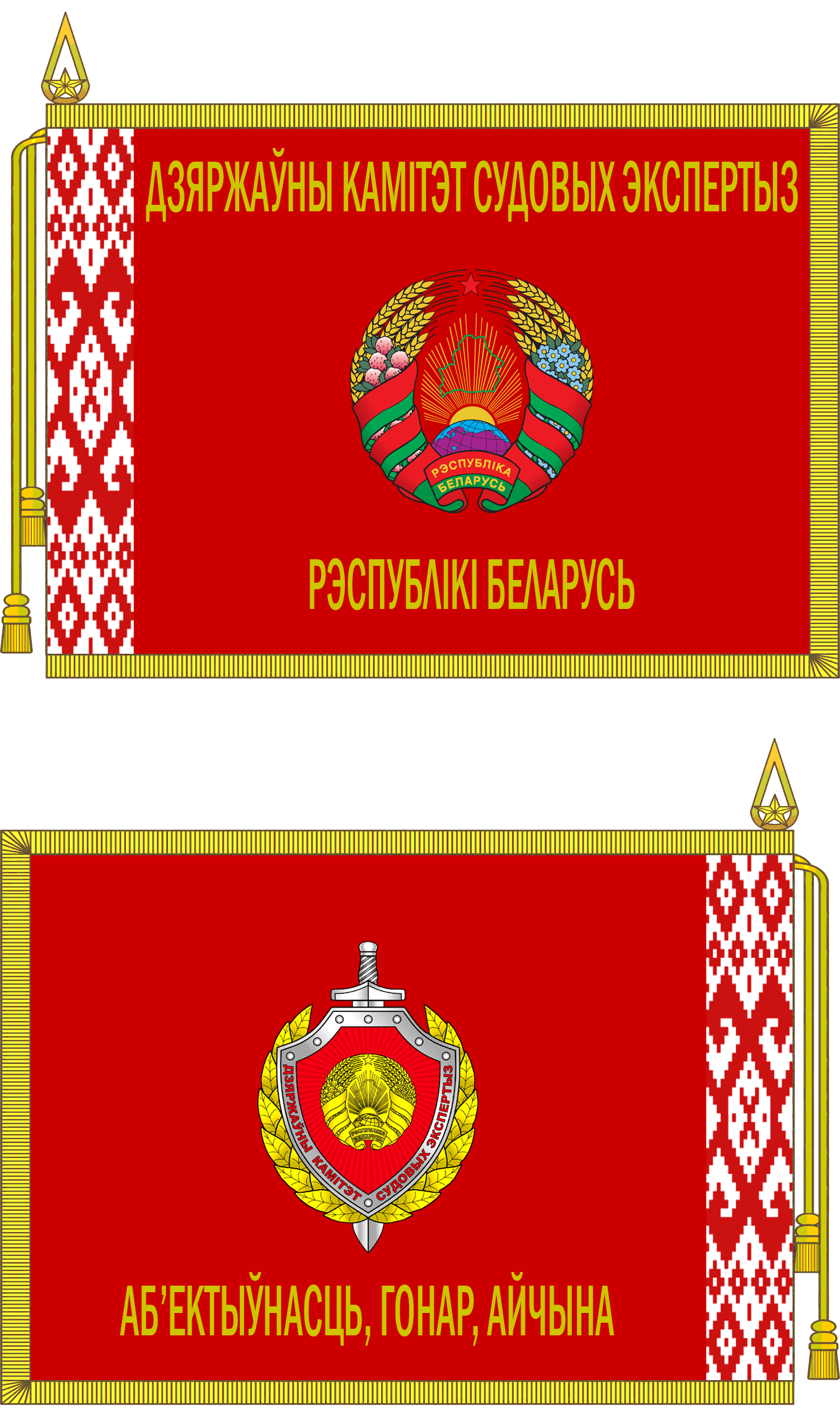
Banner of the State Forensic Examination Committee

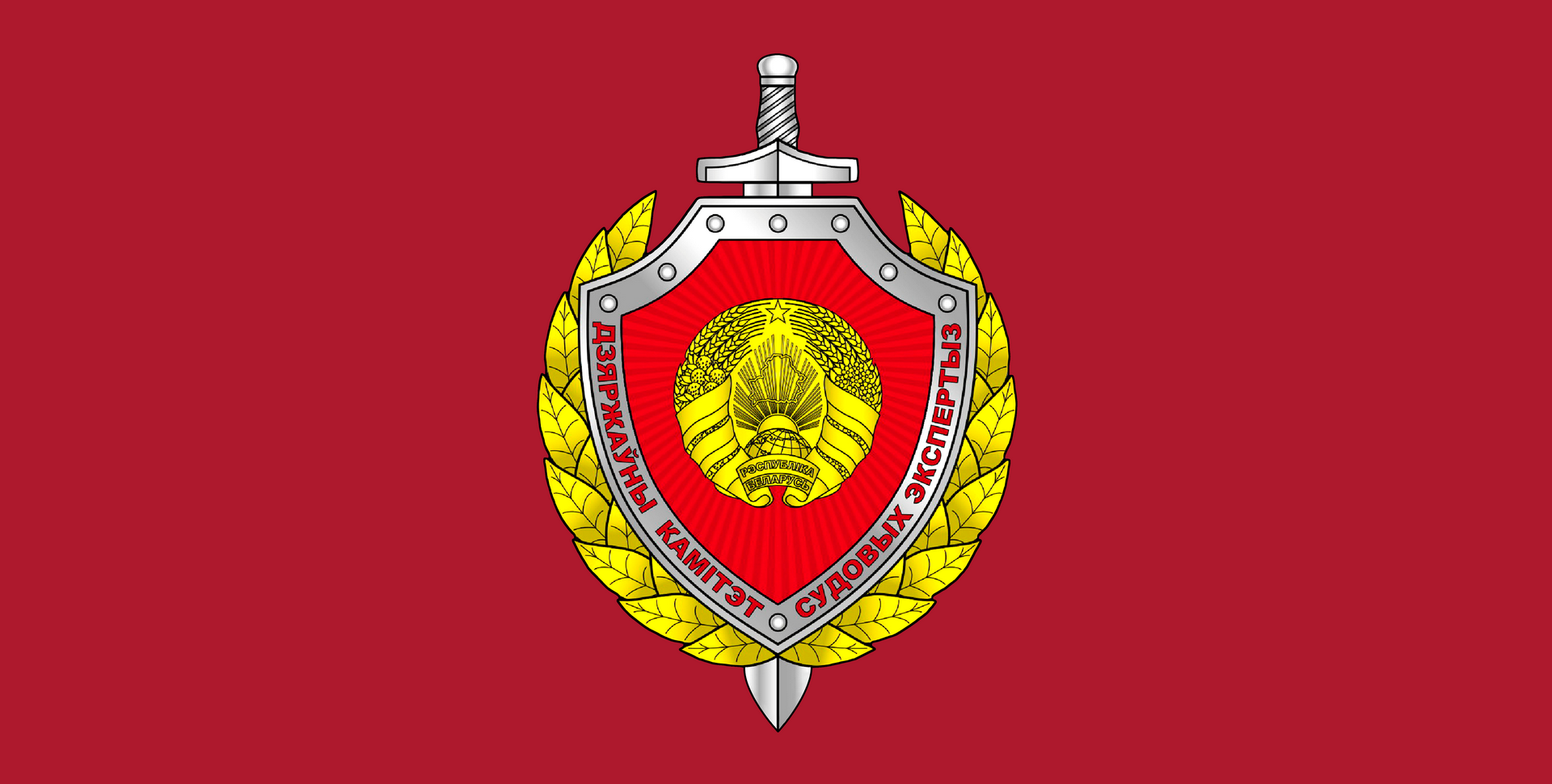
Flag of the State Forensic Examination Committee

== Links ==
- Decree of the President of the Republic of Belarus of April 22, 2013 No. 202 «On the establishment of the State Forensic Examination Committee of the Republic of Belarus»
- Law of the Republic of Belarus of July 15, 2015 No. 293-3 «On the State Forensic Examination Committee of the Republic of Belarus»
- Official site
