= Andrei Shved =

Belarusian politician (born 1973)

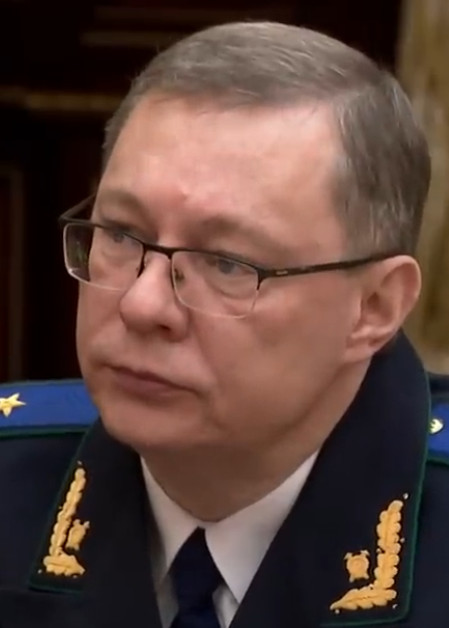
- Shved in 2023

Prosecutor General
- Incumbent
- Assumed office 9 September 2020
- President: Alexander Lukashenko
- Prime Minister: Roman Golovchenko; Alexander Turchin
- Preceded by: Alyaksandr Kanyuk

Chairman of the State Forensic Examination Committee
- In office 22 April 2013 – 9 September 2020
- President: Alexander Lukashenko
- Preceded by: Office established
- Succeeded by: Alexey Volkov

Personal details
- Born: 21 April 1973 (age 52)

Andrei Ivanovich Shved (Russian: Андрей Иванович Швед; born 21 April 1973) is a Belarusian politician serving as prosecutor general since 2020. From 2013 to 2020, he served as chairman of the State Forensic Examination Committee.
