= White-red-white flag =

Historical flag of Belarus

- Historical flag of Belarus; Flag of the Belarusian democratic opposition
- Use: Civil and state flag, civil and state ensign
- Proportion: 1:2
- Adopted: 1918; 108 years ago
- Design: A horizontal triband of white (top and bottom) and red.
- Designed by: Kławdzij Duž-Dušewski
- Variant flag
- Proportion: 2:3

The white-red-white flag (Note: Belarusian: бел-чырвона-белы сьцяг, romanized: byel-chyrvona-byely stsiah, pronounced [bʲɛɫ tʂɨrˈvɔna ˈbʲɛɫɨ sʲtsʲax]) is a historical flag used by the Belarusian Democratic Republic in 1918 before Western Belarus was occupied by the Second Polish Republic and Eastern Belarus was occupied by the Bolsheviks a year later (two years later becoming the Byelorussian SSR). The flag was then used by the Belarusian national movement in Western Belarus followed by use during the German occupation of Belarus between 1943 and 1944, and again after it regained its independence in 1991 until the 1995 referendum.

Opposition groups in modern Belarus continue to use the flag, though its display has been restricted by the government of Belarus under Alexander Lukashenko, which claims it is linked with Nazi collaboration due to its use by Belarusian collaborators during World War II. The white-red-white flag has been used in protests against the government, most recently the 2020–2021 Belarusian protests, and by the Belarusian diaspora.

== Colour scheme ==
Color model	White	Red
CMYK	0–0–0–0	0–100–100–20
RGB	255–255–255	204–0–0
Hex	#FFFFFF	#CC0000

== History ==
=== Creation ===
The design of the flag used between 19 September 1991 and 7 June 1995 had originally been devised by the Belarusian Democratic Republic (March to December 1918). The original person behind the design of the flag is believed to have been Klawdziy Duzh-Dushewski before 1917 and this design is known in Belarusian as the byel-chyrvona-byely s'tsyah (Бел-чырвона-белы сьцяг; literally "white-red-white flag"). Red and white have traditionally been used in the coat of arms of Lithuania (Belarusian: Пагоня, romanized: Pahonia), the state heraldry of the Grand Duchy of Lithuania and also the Polish–Lithuanian Commonwealth, both of which included lands that are now Belarus. There are several other theories explaining the flag's origin. One theory speaks of an allusion to the name of the country, White Ruthenia.

=== Interwar period ===
In 1918, the Belarusian People's Republic (BNR) was proclaimed, the symbols of which became the coat of arms ("Pahonia") and the white-red-white flag. On 11 August, the newspaper Svobodnaya Belarus published the first official description of the flag and coat of arms. From 1919 to 1920, the white-red-white flag was used by Belarusian military formations as part of the Polish and Lithuanian armies. In 1920, the flag was used by participants in the Slutsk uprising.

Between 1921 and 1939 the white-red-white flag was used by the Belarusian national movement in Western Belorussia (part of the Second Polish Republic), both by political organisations like the Belarusian Peasants' and Workers' Union or the Belarusian Christian Democracy, and non-political organisations like the Belarusian Schools Society. The flag was also used by the Belarusian Special Battalion in the Lithuanian army. After the Soviet invasion of Poland and the annexation of modern-day West Belarus in 1939, the flag was forbidden by the Soviet administration in the newly acquired territories as well.

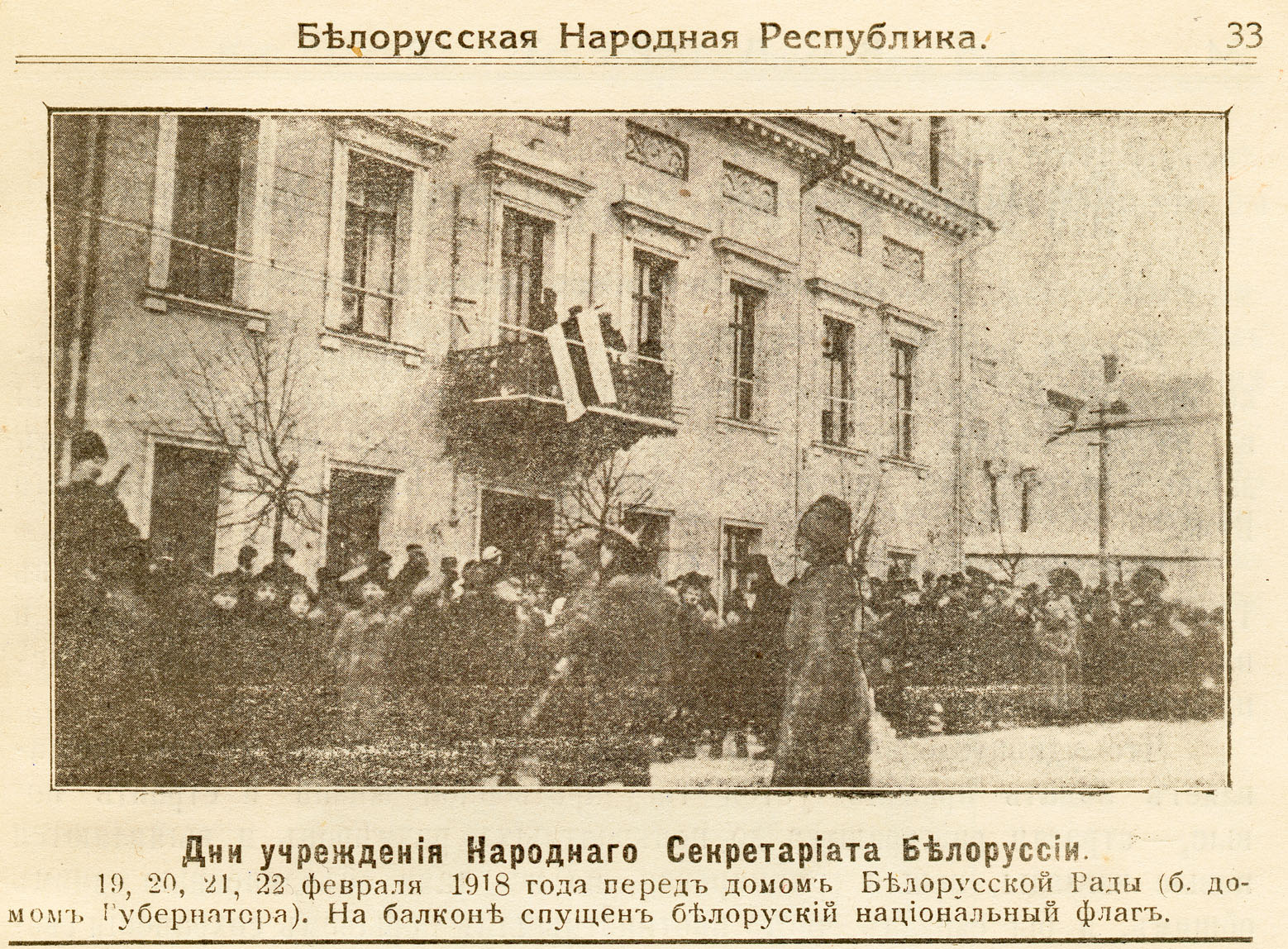
The White-red-white flag on a government building of the Belarusian People's Republic in Minsk, 1918

White-red-white flag of Belarus defaced with the historical Pahonia coat of arms

The flag used by the Belarusian authorities in exile in 1919–1925

Variant used in an unofficial capacity during the early 1990s.

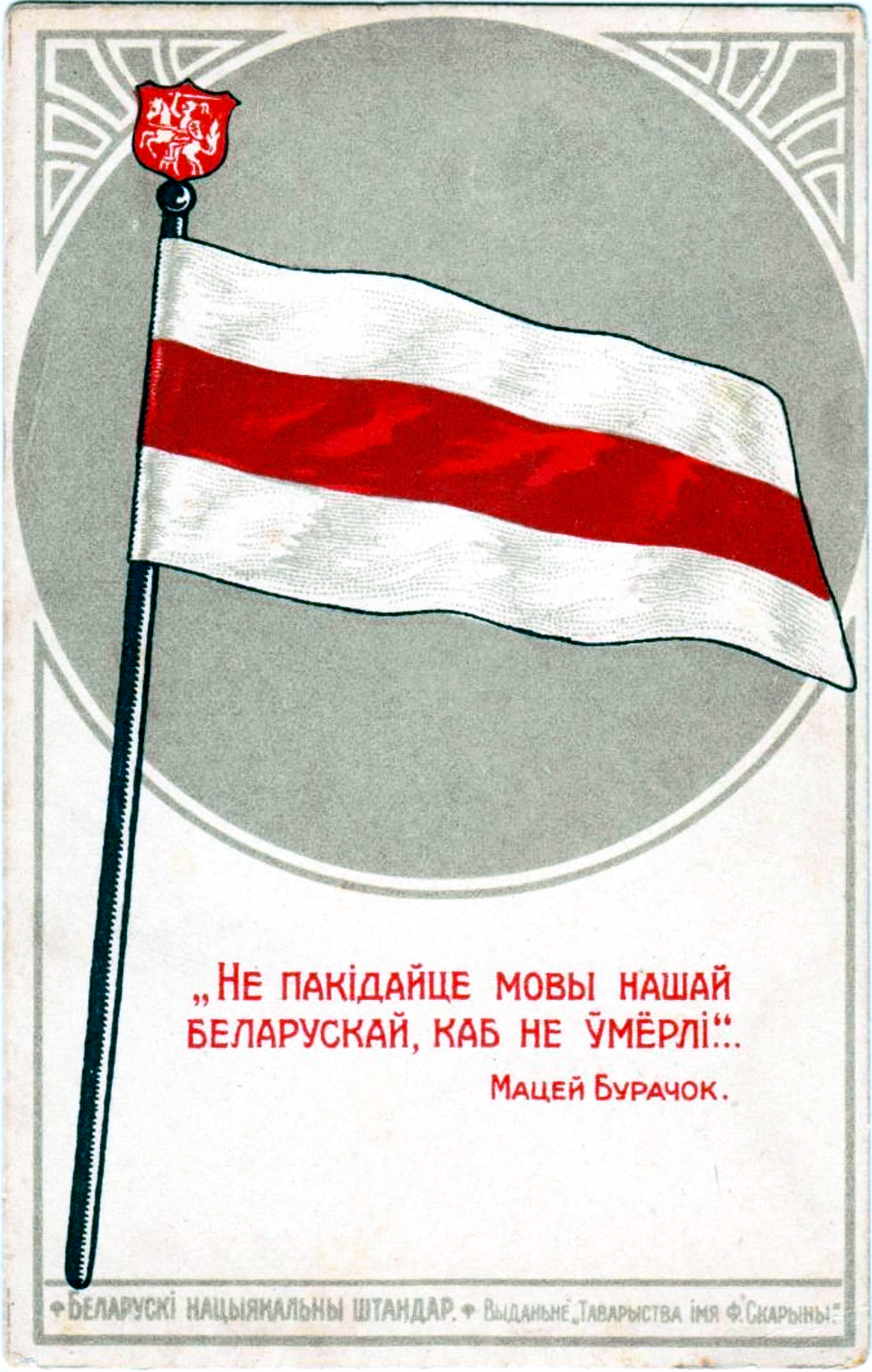
"Do not abandon our Belarusian language, so we do not die"
—Matsiey Burachok

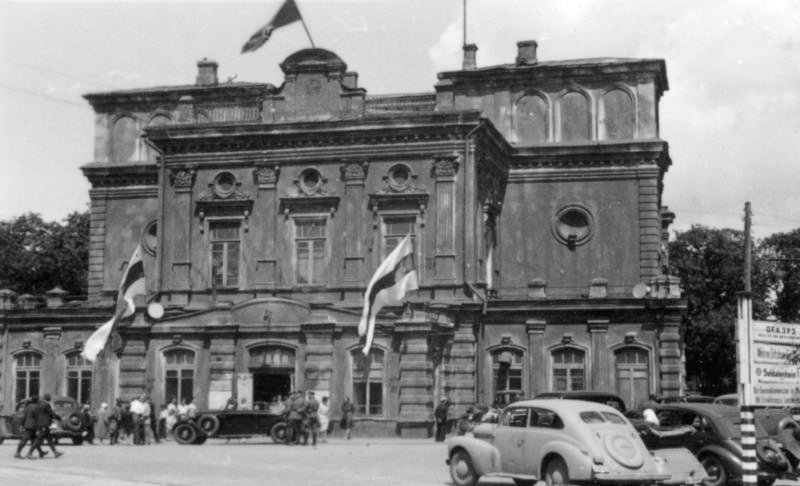
The white-red-white flag being used by the Belarusian Central Rada alongside the Flag of Nazi Germany in June 1943

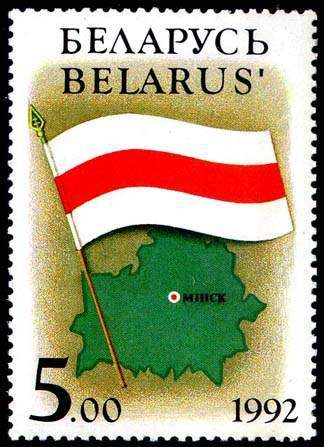
Belarusian stamp, 1992

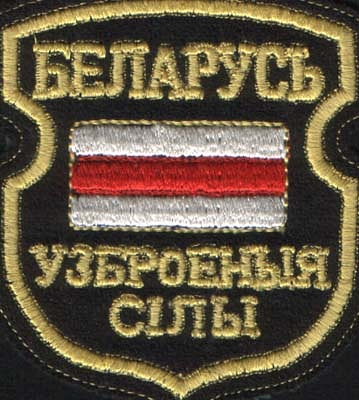
Belarusian army patch, 1992

=== Second World War ===
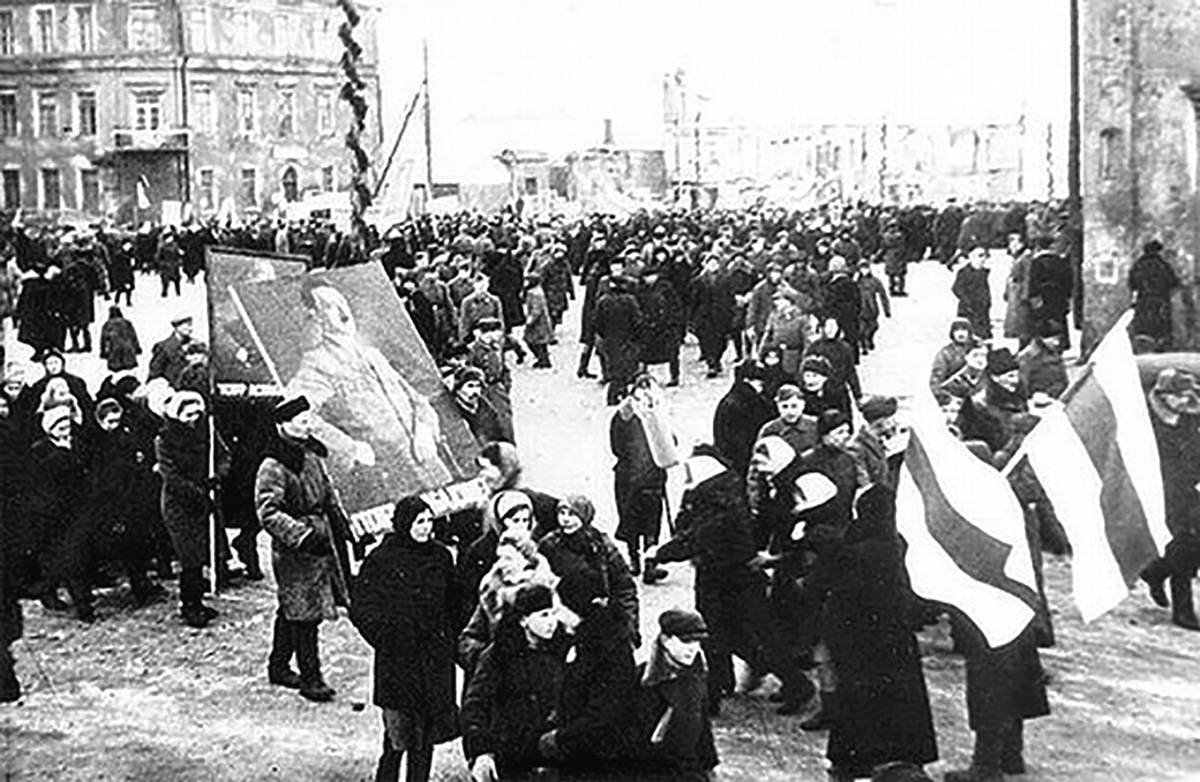
A Belarusian Central Council rally in Minsk in 1943. The supporters are holding the white-red-white flags and a portrait of Adolf Hitler, though the white-red-white flag predates Nazi Germany and Operation Barbarossa.

During World War II the flag was used during Byelorussian collaboration with Nazi Germany, being used by the Belarusian Central Council, Belarusian Home Defence, and later the Belarusian division of the Waffen-SS. However, Duzh-Dushewski, the creator of the flag, refused to cooperate with the Nazi occupation forces and hid a Jewish family in his house, for which he was sent to the Pravieniškės labour camp.

=== Soviet era ===
After World War II, the flag was used by the Belarusian diaspora in the West and by a few groups opposing the Soviet government in Belarus itself. In the late 1980s, amid Mikhail Gorbachev's perestroika and glasnost program, the flag began to be used as a symbol of national revival and democratic changes in the Byelorussian Soviet Socialist Republic, which led to the end of the Soviet Union. This concerned the Baltic republics and Western Belarus, one of the last remaining territories occupied by the Soviet Union, leading to Lithuania re-establishing its national symbols in 1988, with Latvia and Estonia following suit as well as nearby Ukraine in 1990.

=== Independence and opposition era ===
Most commonly used finial of the white red white flag in formal capacity, used between 1991 and 1995. It depicts the Cross of Saint Euphrosyne

After the Belarusian Popular Front's proposal, the flag became the new flag of Belarus when it became an independent country in 1991. Following the dubious 1995 Belarusian referendum, the white-red-white flag was abolished as a state flag, replaced by one similar to that used in the Soviet era, and Alexander Lukashenko's supporters tore it to pieces on the roof of the Presidential Administration of Belarus. However, some people, such as Mikhail Pastukhov and Siarhei Navumchyk, still claim that the White-red-white flag, as well as the Pahonia, are still the de jure symbols of Belarus, due to the proclaimed illegality of the referendum.

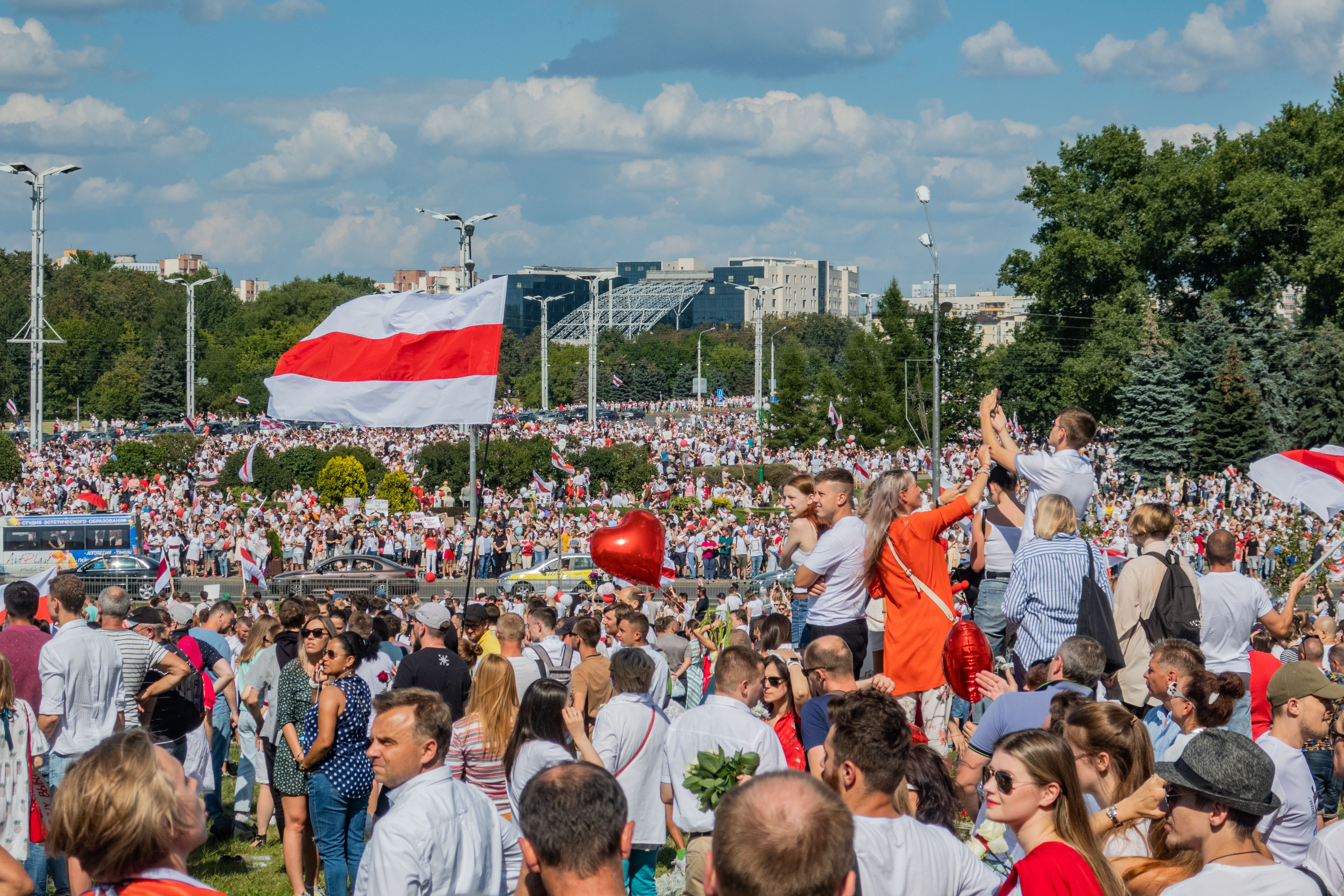
The former flag of Belarus has been used widely during the 2020–2021 Belarusian protests.

After 1995 the white-red-white flag has been used as a symbol of the opposition to the regime of Lukashenko, most notably during protests after the 2006, 2010, 2015, and the 2020 presidential elections and at mass rallies on Freedom Day celebrations as well as Dziady memorial marches. The flag is not officially banned from public usage, but is treated by the authorities as an unregistered symbol which means that demonstration of it by political activists or sports fans can lead to arrests and confiscation of the flags. In early 2010, political activist Siarhei Kavalenka was arrested for placing a white-red-white flag atop a Christmas tree on the central square of Vitebsk. The court gave Kavalenka three years of suspended sentence which was followed by a second arrest and Kavalenka's several weeks long hunger strike. The hunger strike was interrupted by force-feeding on 16 January 2012. According to Vadzim Smok in his research paper of 2013, only 8% of Belarusians considered the white-red-white flag as Belarus' true flag.

The flag's usage became more widespread during the Soft Belarusization policy, which was backed by the Belarusian government. In March 2018, the flag was openly displayed during an 18,000-strong rally commemorating the hundredth anniversary of the establishment of the Belarusian Democratic Republic. It was also present that May during the opening of a monument to Tadeusz Kościuszko.

The flag has been widely used by opposition supporters during the 2020–2021 Belarusian protests in rallies in support of presidential candidate Sviatlana Tsikhanouskaya, and later after the disputed elections, in which, according to the official statement of the Central Election Commission, the current president of the country, Alexander Lukashenko, won the majority of votes. A popular variant used by protesters is the white-red-white flag with the historic Pahonia coat of arms. Initially though, there are reports that some opposition supporters have also used the current flag. As of 7 December 2020, Belarusian authorities are drafting a law that could ban the white-red-white flag.

The flag is used by the Kastuś Kalinoŭski Regiment, a group of Belarusians fighting for Ukraine in the Russo-Ukrainian War. The flag features the emblem of the regiment overlaid on the white-red-white flag, and is also sometimes seen displaying the Ukrainian trident with the Columns of Gediminas. A similar flag was also used by the Pahonia Detachment, a now-disbanded detachment of Belarusians in the Ukrainian Ground Forces.

== Variants ==
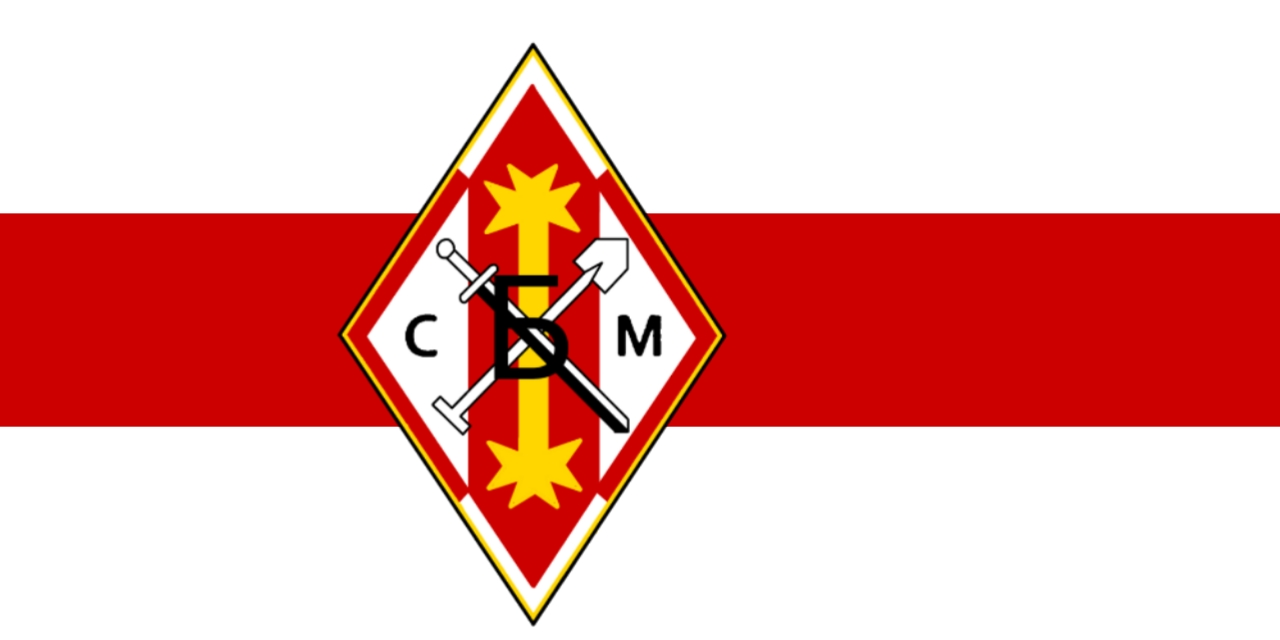
Union of Belarusian Youth

White-red-white flag with a Pahonia in the centre

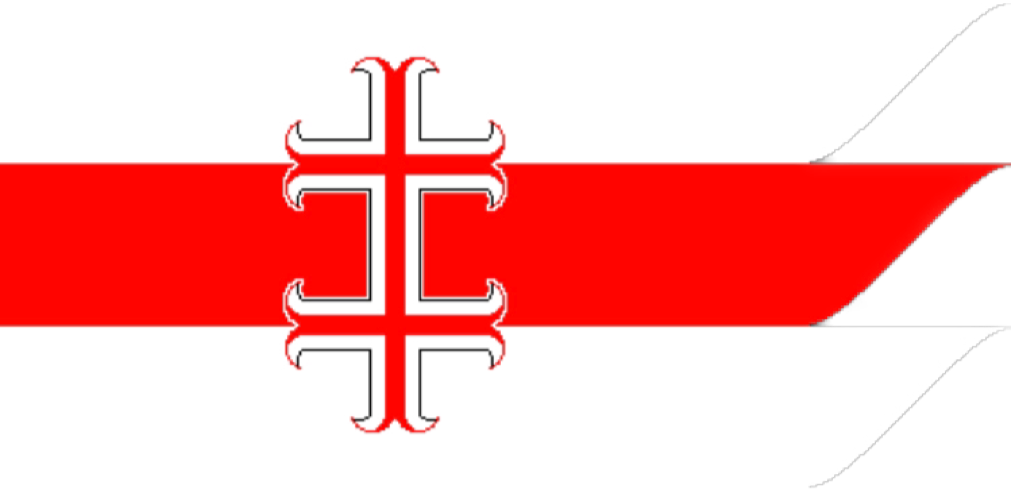
White-red-white flag with a Cross of Saint Euphrosyne

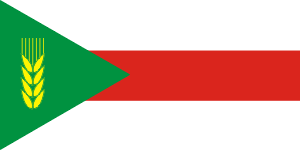
Belarusian Peasant Party

Kastuś Kalinoŭski Regiment, founded in 2022, named after the Belarusian and Polish national hero Kastuś Kalinoŭski, who was a leader of the January Uprising in 1863 against the Russian Empire in Belarus and Lithuania

White-red-white flag with Columns of Gediminas in the form of a trident of the Belarusian diaspora in Ukraine, which is also used by the Kastuś Kalinoŭski Regiment

Lipka Tatars

White-red-white flag with a black stripes

White-red-white flag with a Pahonia with a green border on the fly

== Relationship to other flags ==
The white-blue-white flag created during 2022 anti-war protests in Russia bears similarity to the Belarusian white-red-white flag.

== See also ==
- Flag of Belarus
- White-blue-white flag
- Flag of South Vietnam
- Lion and Sun flag
