= Hair Peace Salon =

Belarusian power pop band

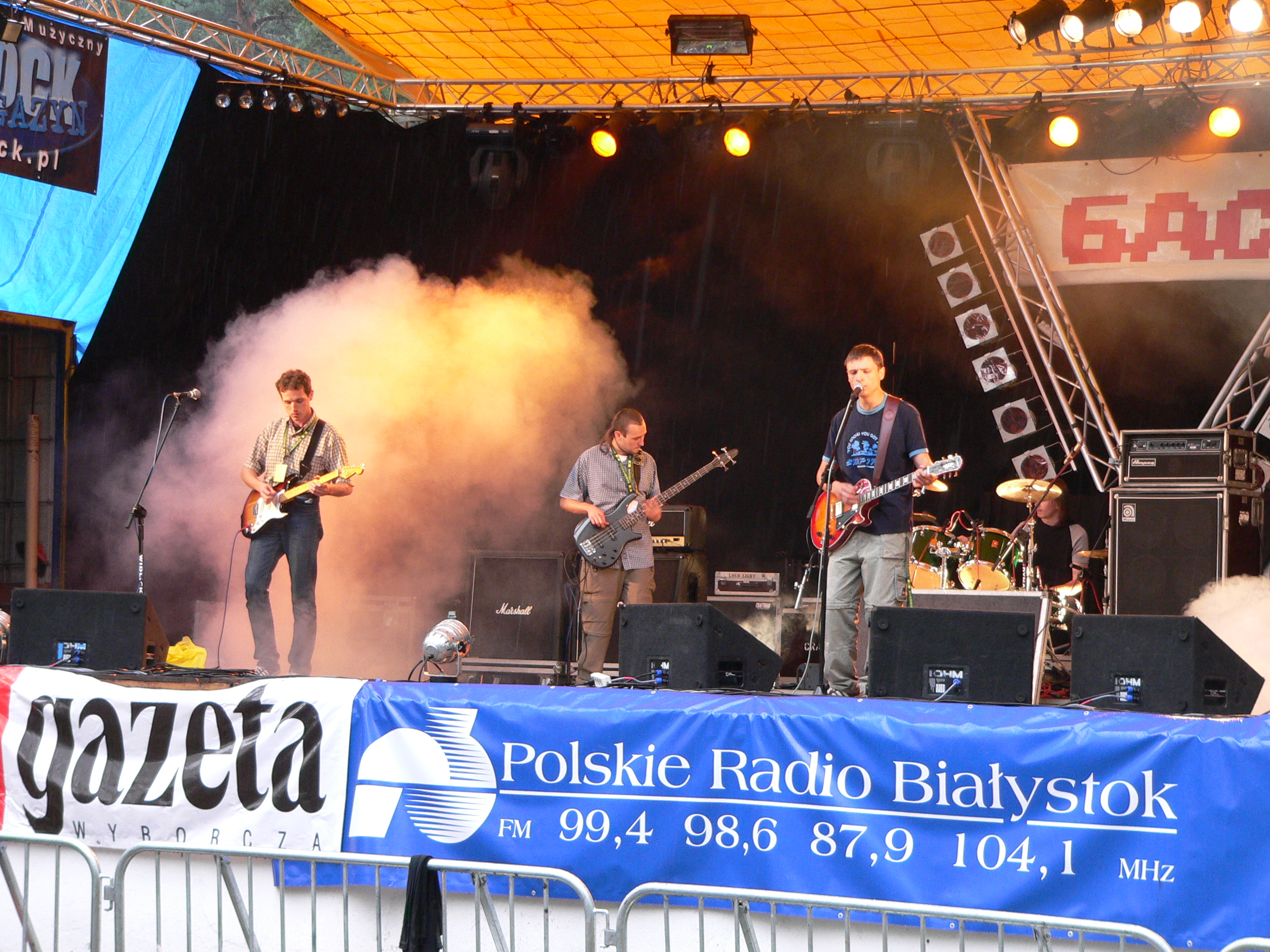
- Hair Peace Salon performing at Basovišča (22 June 2005), from left to right: Vadim Dubina, Maxim "Gandibober" Devichensky, Aleh Vial, Artur Luchkov

Background information
- Origin: Minsk, Belarus
- Genres: Indie rock, alternative rock, power pop, indie pop
- Years active: 1998–2013
- Label: West Records
- Members: Aleh Vial; Konstantin Karman; Maxim "Gandibober" Devichensky; Alex Stepanovich
- Past members: Alex Vashchilo; Artur Luchkov; Vadim Dubina; Vadim Isaev; Andrey Kozik; Alexey Kuznetsov; Vladimir Agayan
- Website: hairpeacesalon.com

Hair Peace Salon is a power pop band from Minsk, Belarus, influenced by Britpop bands and British indie rock. Hair Peace Salon's music is notable in Belarus rock music by its use of English lyrics. The group was founded in 1998, and they have released one full-length album Gentleman, and numerous singles and EPs. In 2013, the members took a break when frontman and co-founder Aleh Vial created another band, Bristeil.

== History ==
=== Early years (1998–2001) ===
Aleh Vial expressed his desire to play music as early as 1996. The following year, his brother acquired a drum kit for his band, which eventually became the first instrument Aleh learned to play. Aleh wanted to join his brother's musical group but was not accepted because he did not play any musical instruments at that time.

In 1998, Aleh, who would become the vocalist and guitarist, gathered two school friends, bassist Maksim Dziewitsynski and drummer Alexander Vashchyla, to form a band. They were inspired by other local Belarusian bands such as Jitters, whom they were mutual friends with, and other bands such as Nirvana, Radiohead, and Pearl Jam. In their early years, the group focused on learning to play their instruments and experimenting with their songwriting.

=== First releases (2002–2006) ===
Their first public performance, coinciding with their new band name Hair Peace Salon, was on February 22, 2002, during a birthday tribute concert to Kurt Cobain and Nirvana at the Minsk club Baza where they would perform several songs. Alexander left the band later that year and was replaced by Artur Luchkow on drums.

Soon after, solo guitarist Vadim Dubina joined the band as their lead guitarist. In March, Hair Peace Salon participated in an avant-garde music and fashion festival in Minsk. To promote themselves, the band recorded their first single, "Next Level," consisting of two songs, which was released in early 2004.

In June 2004, Hair Peace Salon, along with Jitters, participated in the international festival Piirideta Muusika ("Music Without Borders") in Narva, Estonia. During this period, Artur Luchkow and Aleh Vial also played in Jitters, where Konstantin Karman sang and played bass guitar. Both bands frequently performed together at joint concerts and festivals, developing a close friendship.

The band made strides in the grunge scene, actively playing at various Minsk clubs from 2002 to 2004. In 2005, Vadim Dubina left the band due to family circumstances. Four months later, guitarist Vadim Isayev joined the band as their new lead guitarist, via an ad in the Muzykal'naya Gazeta ("Musical Newspaper") newspaper.

In July 2005, Hair Peace Salon participated in the Polish festivals Basovišča '05 and then at Rock-kola-2005 in Polotsk later that year in December. Their next promotional CD was released in 2005, featuring the single "Hover," with the title track included in the British alternative rock compilation"Spotlight On" by Matchbox Recordings, released on November 14, 2005.

In October, Aleh Vial ended performing within Jitters to dedicate more time to Hair Peace Salon. Also near the end of 2005, keyboardist-vocalist Andrey Kozik joined the band, but only played with them for about six months.

By the end of spring 2006, Artur Luchkow also left his side projects with Jitters, and the band spent the year performing on stage. They participated in several concerts across Belarus, as well as foreign festivals, notably in Poland, including "Rock bez Igły" in Tychy, "Wiosło Jaćwinga" in Suwałki, and "Fiesta Borealis" in Olsztyn. Additionally, the band performed at a joint concert with Neuro Dubel, Kama, N.R.M., Indiga, and other prominent Belarusian rock bands in support of the release of the "Songs of Freedom" compilation series, held at Bangalore Square in Minsk on August 25, 2006.

=== Gipsy and in Tune (2007–2009) ===
In 2007 the second EP was released. All songs were performed by all four official band members, while keyboard parts were played by a few different session musicians. The band got the nominee in the category "Rush of the year" at the "Рок-коронация 2007" award show in February, won a selection into the finale in May as the finalist of the contest "ИдиНаРок" in June with its prize, got to record a song in a professional music studio, performed at the biggest country stages during the Day of the City Minsk and at the festival "Ambasovišča" was held by the Belarusian Embassy of the US in September, and became just a semi-finalist on the international live music competition Global Battle of the Bands (2007), but lost to a French band Milque Twins.

After tinkering with sessional keyboardists prior to and on the "Acoustics of Spring" March presentation in view of a half of the year business trip of Konstantin Karman, to the end of 2007 the number of the official members of the band was increased, as he paused the existence of his band Jitters and was invited to play in Hair Peace Salon on a full-time basis. The band already had a full-time bass player, and because he had bought a Roland JP-8000 on his business trip to Scotland, he became a keyboardist with vocal parts, as well as composing songs. On 28 October 2007 the EP Gipsy was released. The new look of the band was shown at the presentation of the EP Gipsy supported by Open Space and some other musicians and friends of the band on 18 November 2007.

On 25 October 2007 the split album named Split Before, Together Now was released on the West Records label to promote this new collaboration. This CD contained Hair Peace Salon (Gypsy) and Jitters (Pick Me Up) EPs with the original artwork filled with two laced together shoes as a symbol that there were two bands, but since this release they are united now. "The guys from HPS have always admired the creativity of the not very famous but beloved in certain circles Jitters band. And today they caught up with them in skill, came near, and even outstripped them in some ways," highlighted Elena Sobolevskaya from the newspaper Muzykalnaya Gazeta the music standards of both Britpop and brit rock collectives in her album review. In addition to regular gigs, given circa 30 live shows in the 2007 year, musicians were successfully participating in various music contests, such as "Musical Playoffs" (semi-finalists), "Golden Acoustics" (the winners),

The official video on the self-titled lead single of the EP "Hover" featuring new band member Konstantin Karman was filmed in February 2008 to be showcased on the television program «Pro движение+».

In March 2008 the lead guitarist Vadim Isaev left the band. That was a hit during the record sessions of the upcoming EP, and although the band tried to find a new solo guitarist, these efforts fell short. Despite this, the remained quartet decided neither to slow their recording tempo, nor to decrease the number of live performances. They took the second place in the contest "Музыкальный спарринг". The very first presentation of the EP In Tune was held in the "Bronx" club on its release date on 1 November 2008 supported by the folk band Akana-NHS with Irena Kotvitskaya and Rusya from Indiga. This CD had four songs, including one bonus track.

As a winner of preliminary rounds together with the Open Space, in January 2009 the band played in the local final of the Bandscan festival, the final of which had to be taken place in Sweden, but they took the second place after The Toobes. The official video of the single "In Tune" was shot in February, and the full edited clip went on public in December. During the springtime, drummer Artur Luchkov left the band as a result of disagreements within Hair Peace Salon, but after brief searching Alexey Kuznetsov, an ex-member of Prophetic Dream, Iris7, and some other bands, was seated in the drum chair.

During the upcoming year, Hair Peace Salon was working in the studio on new material, getting experience with acoustic as well as rock programs, and often playing gigs with the British wave band Open Space like in previous years.

As a participant in the project "Tuzin. Perazagruzka" from the web-portal "Tuzin.fm" and the public campaign "Budzma Belarusians!", the band re-released its song "Ice Age" in the Belarusian language with the poetically translated lyrics by man of letters, Vital Voranau, which became their first song in their native language. This notable track called "Studzień" was put on the compilation CD of the project released in December 2009, subsequently officially digitally re-released on SoundCloud in 2014. In August the band won a national selection organized by European Radio for Belarus and went to Chernihiv (Ukraine) at the "Be Free" festival to present this mother language version of the song live with Lyapis Trubetskoy, Vopli Vidopliassova, and more Belarusian and Ukrainian rock bands.

At the end of 2009, the band redesigned their website with artwork by Polina Pastushenko, director of the "In Tune" music video, to support the release of the brand new video clip on the song "Like A Whale" filmed as a participant of the TV-show "PROдвижение +". Shortly after, Alexey Kuznetsov left the band in December 2009. The frontman Aleh Vial later said that this happened because they had not been playing with him in harmony well. In the coming months, Vladimir Agayan, a fan of the band who won the new drummer selection, became his successor. So, Vial, Devichensky, Karman, and Agayan began to cooperate on a new CD, as they made know on the air on the radio "Stalitsa" and on the pages of the 我爱摇滚乐 ("I Love Rock and roll") magazine.

=== Gentleman (2010–2012) ===
The band was doing well in the first several months of 2010 winning round-by-round in the "Graffiti Open Music Fest" festival, when on 5 April 2010 the very first single of the upcoming full-length album called Happy for a While was released on the Chinese market with different artwork at first to support the signing of the new drummer, while its worldwide release was 5 days later. That one marked the musical shift of the band towards power pop, while the album had to be released next fall. A new melodic and dress code switch was showcased on 10 April 2010, and the release event in the "Broadway" club was supported by Drum Ecstasy, Кассиопея, The Stampletons, and more.

In September 2010 the band made a double release as the brand new rock 'n' roll internet-single Rolz'n'Rulz was supported by the experimental remix EP HPS Remixed filled with 6 remixes of the songs from two latest singles from a few different Minsk electronic stage DJs in trance, drum 'n' bass, downtempo, and more styles.

All of two songs from the singles Happy for a While ("Happy for a While","Out of Time") and self-titled "Rolz'n'Rulz" were credited with Alexey Kuznetsov as the drummer despite his leaving Hair Peace Salon almost a year ago. On 3 December 2010 the band gave an online concert on the biggest Belarusian web-portal Tut.By, performed several songs from these new singles.

In the press release in support of both single and EP, the band indicated that the work on the upcoming debut album will be done by the start of winter 2010. Nevertheless, during the 2011 year the band continued to be focused on writing songs for the forthcoming album.

On 18 March 2012 the band made the official reveal of the first full-length album in a short video clip. Music works from the past three years were merged in the album Gentleman, and this release was started rolling out for free from the official band's website hairpeacesalon.com from 21 March 2012. It's worth to note that despite the previous announce, only 10 tracks appeared in the final release.

"10 good-quality tracks and nothing redundant " from "the album we can certainly be proud of" via Tuzin.fm received mostly positive response: "beautiful voice, good lyrics, excellent sound, flawless execution, competent flow", ""Rolz'n'Rulz" rules", "this collective is just about closer to the standard of the European tradition of combining rock instruments with enough pop melody than all", "melodic and melancholic songs, beautiful guitars, and the recognizable high vocals of Aleh Vial", "the charm of HPS is not just in stylistic restraint and impeccably qualitative arrangements and compositional work, but also in unconditional organicness", "polyphony that sometimes forces to recall the Fab Four gives lightness and a feeling of a large stroke to sound".

At the same time reviewers noted a lack of brightness and originality, because the record was being heard like an ordinary British wave album. "Very nice work where individuality is felt" as it was noted in the review of the year by Tuzin.fm was selected in a few tops of Belarusian albums released in that span, and its first track "Borderline" was chosen in the top of the best contemporary Belarusian songs by Lenta.ru.

Following the album launch, a substitution was made in the band which played live as a trio for a short time again, as Alex Stepanovich was found to replace Vladimir Agayan, who left Hair Peace Salon in July, and the new drummer was officially introduced in September 2012. Because of that, the release party show was postponed to 11 October 2012.

=== Break-up (2013) ===
Supported the new album with a row of shows, acoustic and full rock ones, for half of a year, at its third appearance at an annual Acoustic of Spring event in March 2013, the band showed some new songs to be released under new Aleh Vial's Bristeil band copyright later on: a brand new song in Belarusian Nieba Abraz and Lana Del Rey's hit Video Games (both are from the Cyruĺnia Svietu EP, the latest one will be actually re-sung and covered in the Belarusian language).

The band received a nomination for "Debut of the Year" at the Rock Profi awards for Gentleman. At the end of August 2013, together with The Toobes and Dzieciuki the band was selected to represent Belarus in Poland at the "Cieszanów Rock Festiwal 2013".

Having worked together on recording "VS ½ HPS" in Spring 2013, frontman and guitarist Aleh Vial and drummer Alex Stepanovich with two other musicians founded new Belarusian rock band named Bristol later in autumn. The band got a new name Bristeil some time later and in February 2014, the official site was shut down, and subsequently the domain hairpeacesalon.com was merged with bristeil.com The band has never declared about its break-up, but since 2013 there were no new songs released.

== Style ==
Musicians of Hair Peace Salon started as an alternative rock band at the turn of the millennium, through the first decade of 2000 with an indie rock. brit rock, and Britpop repertoire, became known in the 2010s mainly as performers of English power pop. The music of the band gives emotions of sadness and empathy, so their work more closely matches the definition of brit rock, in which a depressive mood is often present.

Volha Samusik, contributor for the "Muzykalnaya Gazeta", told about the band's performance at the Basovišča'2005 festival on the pages of the periodical, stating: There is a noticeable claim on the Westernism of the sound. The guys play just like crazy. Basovišča is not their level. We do not understand, why they spend their musical time here, they need to conquer European heights... Hair Peace Salon is a good band, especially for those who are a true brit-pop-rocker".

In a review of the 2005 year EP "Hover", the "Muzykalnaya Gazeta" described the music of Hair Peace Salon as "guitar rock in English, rich in ideas, spectacular, which sends you to prog music (what the hell, it is as if brit rockers got complicated)... great vocals. As it is «approved» for this kind of music, arrangeable emotions are poor." In general, the sound of the group is entirely compared to the music of Jitters; after listening to promotional discs for the 2005 year of both bands, О'К put this notion on paper in the same issue of the newspaper, "everything that is written about HPS can be written about Jitters. Maybe "The Jitters" are a little sharper. A half of the members of Jitters completely plays in Hair Peace Salon... or vice versa".

Colleagues of musicians from the Caravan band, when they were asked a question by the newspaper "Muzykalnaya Gazeta" about collectives that they like, in the second January issue of 2005 chose "excellent collectives" Hair Peace Salon and Jitters, because "they play original music".

After one of their concerts around the time of September 2006, columnist for the "Muzykalnaya Gazeta" Slap highly praised the band, "There was an impression that this music is already crowded in a small club room. Taking into account the incandescence of emotions, the quality of material, and its play, it was obvious that it is time to go onto big stages and to a large audience for the guys".

Konstantin Karman joined the band in 2007, playing the synthesizer. Following the results of listening to the album Split Before, Together Now, the "Muzykalnaya Gazeta" once again definitely attributed the creativity of "the Minsk blood brothers of Coldplay" to the British rock scene, because "the bands which belong to britpop (Travis, Radiohead, Muse, Blur, Coldplay) have much in common, they are known, therefore they can be attributed to something... "salons" have something in the sound that is close to all of these collectives, with their own characteristics, of course, but it is known in the same way".

Tat'yana Zamirovskaya from the weekly "BelGazeta" described Hair Peace Salon's music in the review of the same album with the following words, "brit rock with dizzy harmonies' weaves à la The Mars Volta, technical guitar arpeggios à la Muse, and neurotic-sensual intonations à la Travis... some HPS tunes inexplicably reminiscent the new album of Radiohead (released after the disc material has been recorded!)". Another Radiohead comparison was made by her via BelaPAN in 2009.

Elena Sobolevskaya from the music newspaper "Muzykalnaya Gazeta" wrote in 2007, "it has been known for a long time that Hair Peace Salon is not music for the masses".

== Language issue ==
During their early years of existence, Hair Peace Salon performed in English and thus were not invited to festivals and on-air rotation.

However, over time the band "discovered unusual grace and the melody of the Belarusian language", as it was admitted to the news agency «Минск-новости» in 2015 in shared memoirs about the experience of writing its first song in the native language "Studzień". The path to demanded Belarusization was supported by the self-cover of "Gipsy" on the lyrics of Vital Voranau as well as "Ciańki".

== Discography ==
- Next Level (single, 2004)
- Hover (single, 2005)
- Split Before, Together Now (split album, 2007)
- Gipsy (EP, 2007)
- Stand The Rain (single, 2008)
- In Tune (EP, 2008)
- Happy for a While (single, 2010)
- HPS Remixed (EP, 2010)
- Rolz'n'Rulz (single, 2010)
- Gentleman (album, 2012)
- Garela Sasna (feat. Irena Kotvitskaya) (single, 2012)

=== Participation in collections ===
- Spotlight On (2005), track "Hover"
- 我爱摇滚乐 = So Rock! Magazine 98 (2009), track "In Tune"
- Tuzin. Perazagruzka (2009), track "Studzień"
- Budzma The Best Rock / Budzma The Best Rock/New (2009), track "Ciańki"
- «APS Sound» Volume 1 (2012), track "Rolz'n'Rulz"
- The Festival Anthem by Waxme (2013), track "Stand the Rain (Waxme Space Funk Remix)"

== Videography ==
- "Hover" (2008)
- "Like A Whale" (2009)
- "In Tune" (2009)

== Band members ==
- Aleh Vial – lead and backing vocals, rhythm and lead guitars (1998–)
- Konstantin Karman – lead and backing vocals, keyboards, synthesizer (2007–)
- Maxim "Gandibober" Devichensky – bass guitar (1998–)
- Alex Stepanovich – drums (2012–)

Former members

- Alex Vashchilo – drums (1998–2002)
- Artur Luchkov – drums (2003–2009)
- Vadim Dubina – solo guitar (2003–2005)
- Andrey Kozik – keyboards, backing vocals (2005–2006)
- Vadim Isaev – solo guitar, backing vocals (2005–2008)
- Alexey Kuznetsov – drums (2009)
- Vladimir Agayan – drums (2010–2012)

Timeline

== Literature ==
- Д.П. (2008). "«HAIR PEACE SALON»". Энцыклапедыя беларускай папулярнай музыкі (2000 экз ed.). Мінск: Zmicier Kołas. pp. 322–323. ISBN 978-985-6783-42-8.
