= Volha Samusik =

Belarusian journalist (1985-2010)

Volha Samusik Belarusian: Вольга Эдуардаўна Самусік
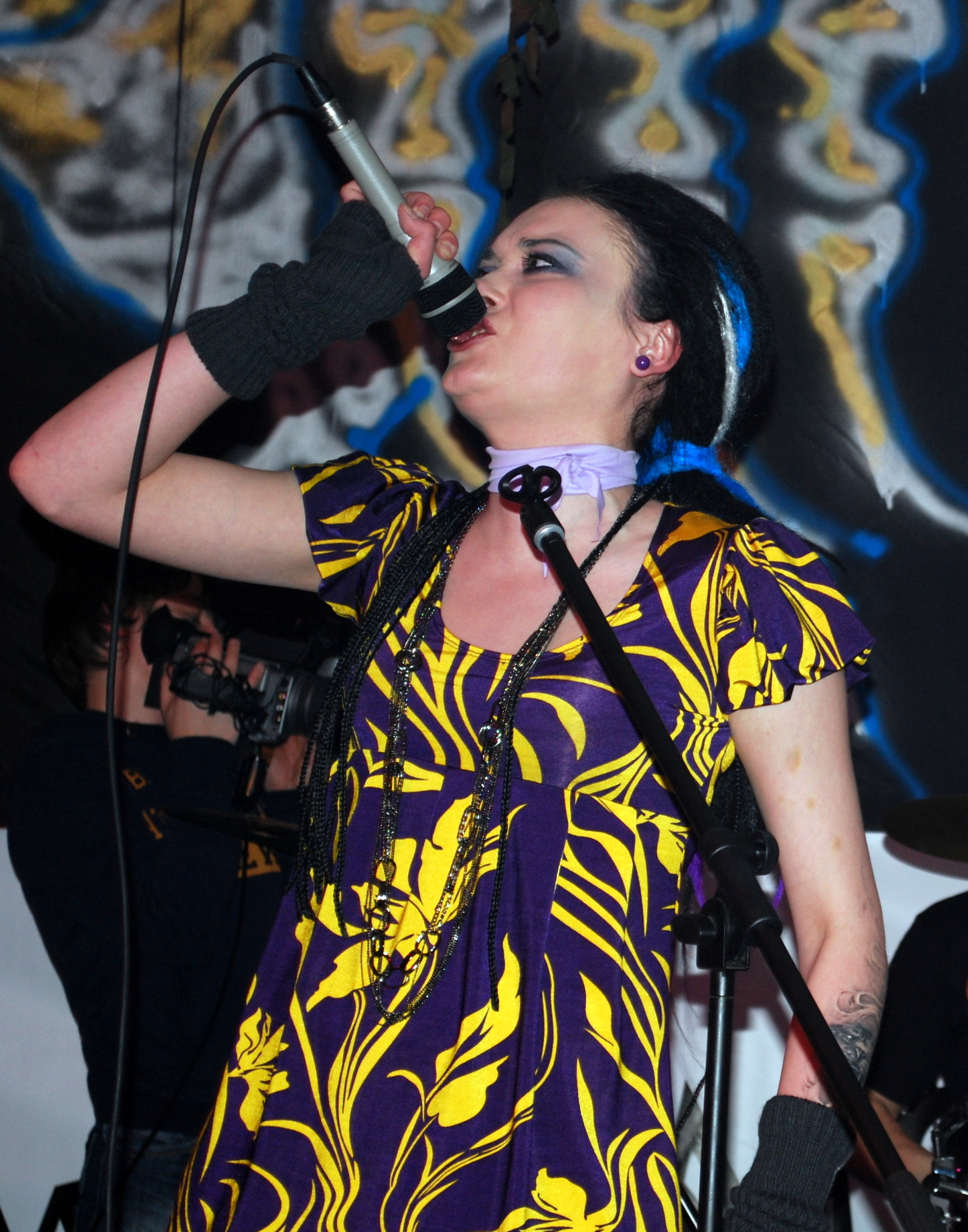
- Volha Samusik in February, 2010

Background information
- Born: Вольга Эдуардаўна Самусік; 7 January 1985; Minsk, Belarus
- Died: 7 December 2010 (aged 25) Minsk, Belarus
- Genres: rock
- Occupations: singer, journalist
- Instrument: vocal
- Years active: 2004—2010
- Formerly of: Tarpach, žygimont VAZA, Hasta La Fillsta, Neuro Dubel

Volha Samusik (Belarusian: Вольга Эдуардаўна Самусік; 7 January 1985, Minsk — 7 December 2010, Minsk) was a Belarusian rock singer and journalist.

== Biography and career ==
Volha was born on 7 January 1985 in Minsk (Belarusian SSR).

She studied at Minsk school №146 from 1991 to 1995, then moved to school №189, which she graduated in 2002. In the same year she entered the Faculty of Journalism of BSU. While studying, she contributed to Muzykalnaya Gazeta, Narodnaja Volya, Belorusskaya Delovaya Gazeta, and other outlets. In 2007–2008 she worked as a journalist at the “Novaye Radio,” anchored the show “Antipop.” After graduation in 2008, she was distributed to the newspaper Sovetskaya Belorussiya – Belarus' Segodnya.

Volha was the vocalist of the rock bands Tarpach (2005–2009), žygimont VAZA (2004—2010), and Hasta La Fillsta (2009—2010). She also collaborated with the bands B:N:, Neuro Dubel, ZM99, and Lavon Volski.

She was named a Rock-Princess at the ceremony “Rock Coronation-2007,” which was held in Minsk on 29 February 2008.

As a vocalist of the band Tarpach at the Rock-kola festival in 2007, she won a prize for best vocals, while her band won the grand prix.

== Sickness and death ==
Volha Samusik died at age 25, on 7 December 2010, from a prolonged pneumonia. She underwent three major operations, after the third one on the night of December 6–7, she did not recover.

A concert in honor of Volha Samusik was organized by her girlfriend Zoya Sakhonchik from the band ZM99 in December 2011. During the musical evening, Alexander Rakovets and his band IQ48, Anastasia Shpakovskaya, Leonid Narushevich and his band Knyaz Myshkin, Oleg Khamenka, Alexander Pamidorau, Alexander Kullinkovich and Yuri Naumov (both of Neuro Dubel), and others appeared on the stage of the Minsk club "Loft." The money raised was given to Volha's parents for a monument.

== Appraisal ==
In the report from the joint-concert with the participation of Tarpach in 2008, Alena Sobolevskaya, concert columnist for LiveSound.by, highlighted the choreography and vocal abilities of the “excellent music journalist (vocalist).”

Oleg “О’К” Klimov, editor-in-chief of Muzykalnaya Gazeta, recalled Volha as an excellent employee who “always made interesting and cool materials, offered ideas by herself;” from the musical side, in his opinion, she was most successfully realized in the band žygimont VAZA. Guitarist of Tarpach Dmitry Astapuk remembered that Volha “was a creative person, capable of a lot of things.” The founder and producer of the “Rock Coronation” Yury Tsybin spoke about “a phenomenon in Belarusian rock and roll.” Reminiscing about joint-projects, Lavon Volski praised her for responsibility and professionalism.

== Discography ==
- 2005 — žygimont VAZA — Distortion
- 2010 — Lavon Volski — Такого няма нідзе
- 2010 — Hasta La Fillsta — № 1
- 2011 — Tribute to Neuro Dubel

== Videography ==
- žygimont VAZA — Distortion
- Tarpach — Я люблю людзей
- Tarpach — Нечакана
- Lavon Volski — Такого няма нідзе
- Neuro Dubel — 20 лет в тумане
