= Vital Voranau =

Belarusian-Polish playwright, translator, writer and poet

Vital Voranaŭ
- Віталь Воранаў
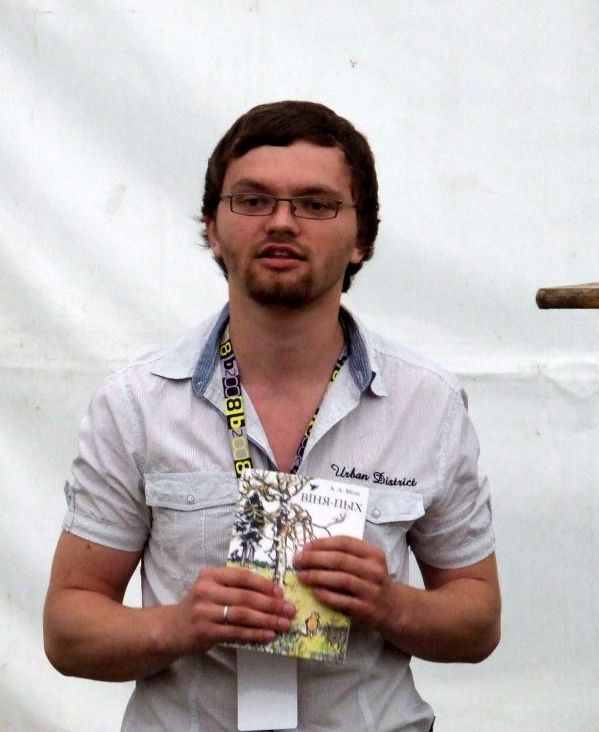
- Voranaŭ in 2008
- Born: 18 March 1983 (age 43); Minsk, Byelorussian SSR, Soviet Union
- Education: Masaryk University
- Occupations: playwright, translator, writer and poet

Vital Voranaŭ (Belarusian: Віта́ль Во́ранаў, Polish: Wital Woranau; born 18 March 1983) is a Belarusian-Polish playwright, translator, writer, academic, and poet. He is a co-founder of Belarusian Cultural and Scientific Centre in Poznań and the publishing house Bely Krumkacz. He was born in Minsk, Byelorussian SSR and now lives in Poland. He completed his doctorate at Masaryk University in Czech Republic and teaches Irish literature and history of Belarus in Southwestern College in the United States.

He translated Samuel Beckett's play Waiting for Godot and Alan Milne's story Winnie the Pooh into the Belarusian language. Together with Britpop band Hair Peace Salon, he participated in the musical projects of the public campaign Budźma Biełarusami! “Tuzin. Perazagruzka” (with Tuzin.fm) with Belarusian lyrics to the song “Studzień” (transl. Ice Age), “Budzma The Best Rock / Budzma The Best Rock/New” (with European Radio for Belarus) with a literary translation of the words of the song “Ciańki” (transl. Gipsy), and cooperated with Atlantica, Tanin Jazz, and other bands too.

In 2013, he published a "Zeszytów Poetyckich" (Notebooks Poetic) collection of prose "The Grand Duchy of Belarus" that was translated by Monika Uranek, edited by Dawid Jung with graphics by Vladimir Bludnik.

In 2015, he published his novel Szeptem.
