= XLAM: Luchshaya Belarusskaya Alternativa =

Compilation album by Various artists
- Released: June 11, 2006
- Recorded: 2006
- Genre: Metal, nu metal, deathcore, rapcore
- Length: 76:27
- Label: GO-Records, Xlam.by

XLAM: Luchshaya Belarusskaya Alternativa (Russian: XLAM: Лучшая беларусская альтернатива) is a compilation album by Belarusian alternative bands released by the portal Xlam.by on the label GO-Records on June 11, 2006.

== Background and release ==
Work on creating a list of artists on the disc began in February 2006. When choosing bands, attention was paid to the unusualness of musical material, as well as to the quality of the proposed tracks. As the project coordinator Dmitry Dmitriev spoke via Naviny.by, the main condition was “to be a Belarusian band playing high-quality, extreme, and honest music that is looking for its listener.”

As the publishers indicated, the goal of compilation was to discover new names in alternative music. Its circulation was to be 1,500 copies, one third of which was intended for distribution on the Russian market.

The presentation of the disc with the participation of a number of bands whose works were included in the compilation album took place on the day of its release on June 11, 2006, in Gomel, while the Ukrainian band Skinhate became the invited headliner of the party.

== Track listing ==
1. Пневмания — «Открой меня»
2. 3t.ON — «Дай нам знать»
3. Rasta — «Hakkah»
4. Ricochet — «Рикошет кор»
5. kuktooz — «Пустыня»
6. TT-34 — «Иной»
7. IKONA — «Не верю»
8. D-Tails — «Выжигая огнем»
9. Tweed — «Зверь»
10. M.L.A. — «Рио»
11. Tav.Mauzer — «Брудная вада»
12. 4example — «Как земле вода»
13. Zv!k — «Клон»
14. Stinkface — «Ashamed»
15. Кризис — «Суицид»
16. Usplёsk — «Эфіp superlight»
17. Контур — «Все в глазах»
18. Termin X — «Згубіцца»
19. ONEGIN — «Smilla»
20. <killkitau> — «Больше ничего»
21. Скимен — «Зачем»

== Critical reception ==
The song “Открой меня” by Пневмания was highlighted in the review of Muzykalnaya Gazeta, while the band ONEGIN disappointed critics. Later on, the disc was characterized by Muzykalnaya Gazeta’s Maxim Zhukov by the adjective “rich.”

Siarhei “SB” Budkin from Tuzin.fm and Nasha Niva called the CD an alternative to the project “Вольныя танцы: альтэрнатыва by,” while the music was described by the words “expressive, aggressive, intertwined with nerves and screams.”
