= Budzma The Best Rock / Budzma The Best Rock/New =

Compilation album by Various artists
- Released: 2009
- Recorded: 2009
- Genre: rock
- Length: 120 mins.
- Label: Budzma Belarusians!, European Radio for Belarus
- Producer: Slava Korań

Various artists chronology
Budzma The Best Foĺk Madern (2009)	Budzma The Best Rock / Budzma The Best Rock/New (2009)

Budzma The Best Rock / Budzma The Best Rock/New is a two-disc compilation album by Belarusian rock bands. Both invited musicians and the winners of selection were put on the compilation. CDs were published by the public movement Budzma Belarusians! together with European Radio for Belarus in November 2009, and a few months later all of the FM-radio stations, regional and district Houses of Culture of Belarus received them. The compiler and mastering engineer is Slava Korań, the frontman of the ULIS band.

== Track listing ==
Budzma The Best Rock
No.	Title	Lyrics	Music	Cyrillic spelling	Length
1.	"Belarusian: Biełaja Ptuška" (Impedance)			Belarusian: Белая птушка	3:41
2.	"Belarusian: Słuchaj Mianie" (Krama)			Belarusian: Слухай мяне	3:21
3.	"Belarusian: Serca" (Partyzone)			Belarusian: Сэрца	4:06
4.	"Belarusian: Guzik" (Neuro Dubel)	Alexander Kullinkovich, Neuro Dubel	Alexander Kullinkovich, Neuro Dubel	Belarusian: Гузік	3:59
5.	"Belarusian: Vyjście" (IQ48)			Belarusian: Выйсьце	3:52
6.	"Belarusian: Padarožža" (ULIS)			Belarusian: Падарожжа	3:21
7.	"Belarusian: Jak Viecier" (WZ-Orkiestra, Zmicier Vajciuškievič)			Belarusian: Як вецер	4:55
8.	"Belarusian: Try Soncy" (Indiga)			Belarusian: Тры сонцы	2:37
9.	"Belarusian: Katuj-Ratuj" (N.R.M.)			Belarusian: Катуй-ратуй	5:12
10.	"Belarusian: Stary Sabaka" (Krama)	Zmicier Lukašuk	Ihar Varaškievič	Belarusian: Стары сабака	5:12
11.	"Belarusian: 1-2-3" (Zet)			Belarusian: 1-2-3	3:03
12.	"Belarusian: Vitalnaja" (Pomidor/off)			Belarusian: Вітальная	3:27
13.	"Belarusian: Ja Tanču" (ULIS)			Belarusian: Я танчу	4:08
14.	"Belarusian: Svaboda" (Neuro Dubel– (Note: Belarusian cover version of the song "Polish: Kocham wolność" from the album "O! Ela" by the Chłopcy z Placu Broni band on translated lyrics by Michail Aniempadystaŭ.))	Michail Aniempadystaŭ	Alexander Kullinkovich, Neuro Dubel	Belarusian: Свабода	3:01
15.	"Belarusian: Čufut Kale" (ZERO-85)			Belarusian: Чуфут Кале	5:51
16.	"Belarusian: Tvoj Son" (žygimont VAZA)			Belarusian: Твой сон	4:19
17.	"Belarusian: Svabody Hłytok" (N.R.M.)			Belarusian: Свабоды глыток	3:01
18.	"Belarusian: Jak Pišču Strału" (Znich)			Belarusian: Як пушчу стралу	4:38

Budzma The Best Rock/New
No.	Title	Lyrics	Music	Cyrillic spelling	Length
1.	"Belarusian: Bałada" (Litvintroll)			Belarusian: Балада	4:14
2.	"Belarusian: Chroniki Smutnaha Časy" (Imprudence)			Belarusian: Хронікі смутнага часу	4:55
3.	"Belarusian: Brudnaja Dziaŭčyna" (Re1ikt)			Belarusian: Брудная дзяўчына	4:35
4.	"Belarusian: Da Sinih Skałaŭ" (Esprit)			Belarusian: Да сініх скалаў	2:46
5.	"Belarusian: Nienavidžu" (Holaja Manaška)			Belarusian: Ненавіджу	2:56
6.	"Belarusian: Śpi, Moj Kraj" (Hliuki)			Belarusian: Спі, мой край	3:43
7.	"Belarusian: Pieśnia Choć Treśni" (Wanted)			Belarusian: Песня хоць трэсні	3:10
8.	"Belarusian: 224022" (VS[RIP])			Belarusian: 224022	2:40
9.	"Belarusian: Małpy" (Ban-Žvirba)			Belarusian: Малпы	3:36
10.	"Belarusian: Ciańki" (Hair Peace Salon– (Note: Belarusian cover version of the song transl. "Gipsy" from the album ”Split Before, Together Now” on translated lyrics by Vital Voranau.))	Vital Voranau	Hair Peace Salon	Belarusian: Цянькі	3:44
11.	"Belarusian: Pustoje Śviatło" (Glofira)	Vika Trenas	Siarhiej Sočnieŭ	Belarusian: Пустое святло	3:50
12.	"Belarusian: Nie Pakidaj Mianie Tut (Ad Imia Trahična Zahinułaj Alony Ja.)" (Holaja Manaška)			Belarusian: Не пакідай мяне тут (Ад імя трагічна загінулай Алены Я.)	3:55
13.	"Belarusian: Niečakana" (Tarpach)			Belarusian: Нечакана	4:45
14.	"Belarusian: Pachnie Čabor" (Litvintroll)			Belarusian: Пахне чабор	2:53
15.	"Belarusian: Pij Da Dna" (In Search For)			Belarusian: Пей да дна	4:07
16.	"Belarusian: Cukierka" (Cukierka)			Belarusian: Цукерка	4:07
17.	"Belarusian: Nažy" (Re1ikt)			Belarusian: Нажы	1:48
18.	"Belarusian: Znajdzi Mianie" (Esprit)			Belarusian: Знайдзі мяне	3:03

== Critical reception ==
Alieh Michalievič, head of Radio "Stolitsa," in a letter to Budzma Belarusians! underlined “high-quality domestic-produced Belarusian compositions!” Chief director of Radio Belarus Naum Galperovich also thanked for the disk, material from which “certainly arouse interest.” Director of the radio channel "Culture" Kaciaryna Ahiejeva reported that she particularly liked the compilation album of Belarusian rock, while the music editors of her radio station recognized the excellent quality of recordings, so they gladly air the compositions on the network.

Several songs from the compilation were presented in the Tuzin.fm charts: “Jak Viecier” (WZ-Orkiestra, Zmicier Vajciuškievič) (“Megatour-2008”), “Znajdzi Mianie” (Esprit) (“Megatour-2009”), “Da Sinih Skałaŭ” (Esprit), “Ciańki” (Hair Peace Salon) (all “Megatour-2010”).

The song “Vyjście” by IQ48 was selected in the list of “100 Greatest Belarusian Songs” presented by Tuzin.fm in 2015.
