= Hover (EP) =

EP by Hair Peace Salon
- Released: 2005a
- Recorded: 2005
- Studio: X-NOISE Factory
- Genre: brit-rock, progressive rock
- Length: 10:57

Hair Peace Salon chronology
Next Level (2004)	Hover (2005)	Gipsy (2007)

Hover (also known as just “Hair Peace Salon”) is an EP by Belarusian rock band Hair Peace Salon recorded at the Gennadiy “Gena Dee” Syrokvash’s X-NOISE Factory studio and released in 2005. All of songs were performed in English.

== Critical reception ==
О’К, columnist over at the musical newspaper Muzykalnaya Gazeta, described the content of the CD, which leaves references to progressive rock, with the words “guitar, rich in ideas, spectacular,” praised outstanding vocals as well as noticed the poverty of arranging emotions. According to him, the songs from the EP are very similar to the songs from the EP Promo Disk 2005 by Jitters, a brit-rock band too, and the most conspicuous tracks on the disc are “Hover” and “Morning Stuff.”

Later on as a part of the “Spotlight On” compilation, “Hover” was mentioned by Dave Chislett for eclecticism and vocals à la Billy Mackenzie.

Through the prism of the review of the album Gentleman by Hair Peace Salon, Siarhei Budkin, music critic over at Budzma Belarusians!, expressed sadness that “the outstanding work” “Hover” did not make its cut.

== Awards ==
In June 2007 the “victory hymn” “Hover” allowed the band to win the final of the «Russian: ИдиНаРок» contest with a prize to record a song at a professional music studio.

== Track listing ==
No.	Title	Length
1.	"Hover"	3:45
2.	"One Message"	3:20
3.	"Morning Stuff"	3:52

== Personnel ==
Hair Peace Salon:
- Aleh Vial – lead vocals, guitar.
- Vadim Dubina – lead guitar, backing vocals.
- Maxim “Gandibober” Devichensky – bass.
- Artur Luchkov – drums.
