= Be Free (festival) =

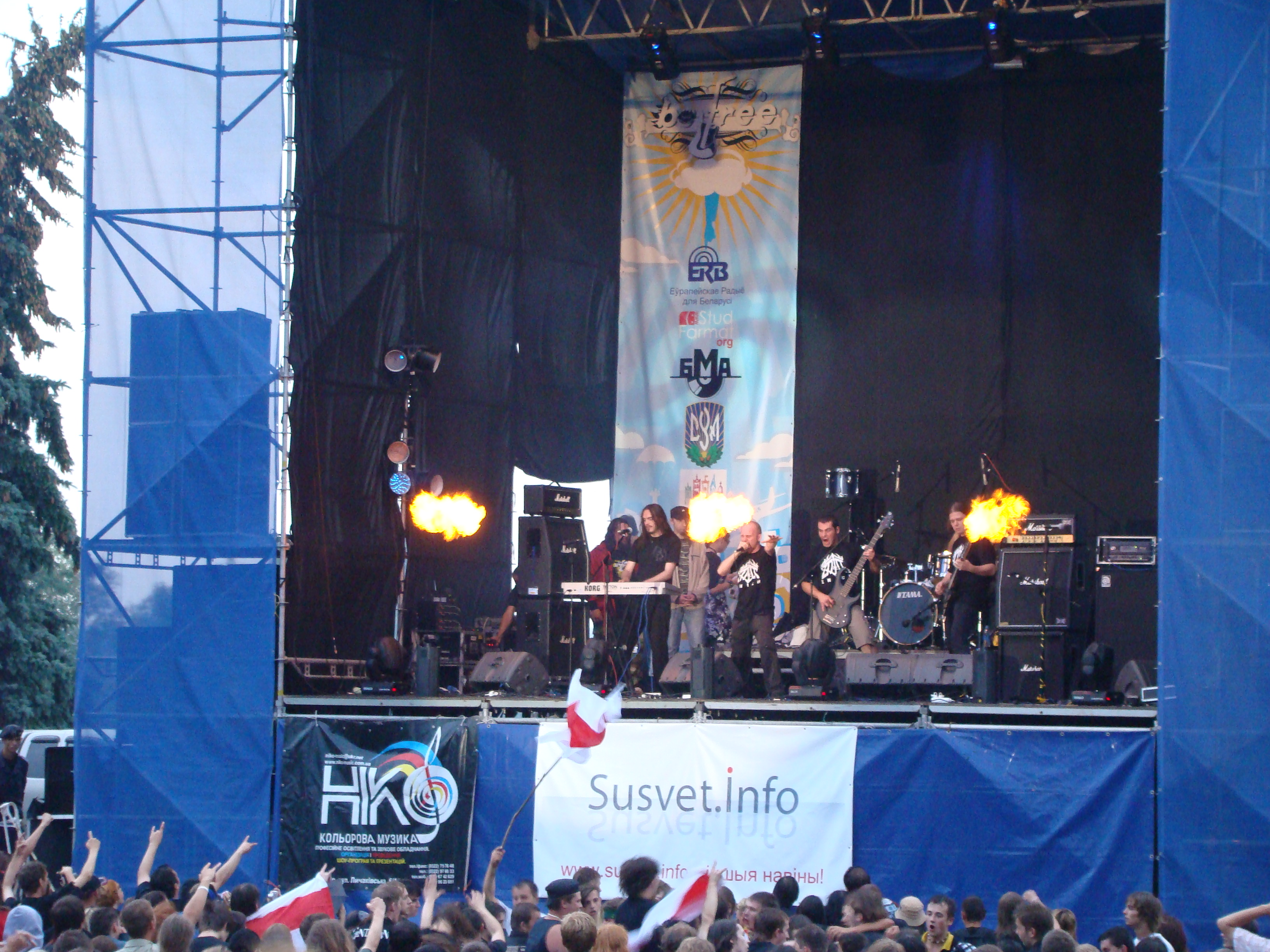
- Be Free 2008 in Lviv
- Genre: rock
- Dates: various
- Locations: Lutsk (2007); Lviv (2008); Chernihiv (2009)
- Years active: 2007–2010
- Website: http://festsvabody.org

Be Free (Belarusian: Будзь свабодным; initial name: Belarusian: Права быць свабодным (transl. The right to be free)) was a Belarusian rock festival that took place in Ukraine since 2007. Bands from Poland, Ukraine, and France participated in the festival too.

== Be Free 2007 ==
Date – September 22, 2007.

Location – Lutsk.

Compère – Vitaĺ Malinoŭski.

=== Bands ===
- Krama (Belarus)
- Neuro Dubel (Belarus)
- Tav.Mauzer (Belarus)
- Indiga (Belarus)
- :B:N: (Belarus)
- Znich (Belarus)
- Sciana (Belarus)
- ULIS (Belarus)
- Tin Sontsia (Ukraine)

== Be Free 2008 ==
Dates – August 9–10, 2008.

Location – Lviv.

Compère – Aliaksandr Pamidoraŭ.

=== Bands ===
==== August 9 ====
The beginning of the program was the performances of 3 young bands, the winners of the European Radio for Belarus contest (Belarus).

- :B:N: (Belarus)
- Partyzone (Belarus)
- Incunabula (Ukraine)
- Pomidor/OFF (Belarus)
- ROCKAWAY (Poland)
- žygimont VAZA (Belarus)
- Vladivostok (France)
- Znich (Belarus)
- Zet (Belarus)
- Haydamaky (Ukraine)
- Voo Voo (Poland)

==== August 10 ====
- Akana-NHS’s Nastya Nekrasova’s band (Belarus)
- P.L.A.N. (Belarus)
- Яр (Belarus)
- Джамбібум (Belarus)
- Litvintroll (Belarus)
- Stary Olsa (Belarus)
- WZ-Orkiestra (Belarus)
- Showcase performances of knight clubs (Ukraine)
- ХуЧ (Ukraine)
- IQ48 (Belarus)
- METANOIA (Poland)
- Krama (Belarus)
- ULIS (Belarus)
- Neuro Dubel (Belarus)
- Habakuk (Poland)
- Tartak (Ukraine)

== Be Free 2009 ==
Dates – August 22–23, 2009.

Location – Chernihiv.

Compère – Aliaksandr Pamidoraŭ.

=== Bands ===
==== August 22 ====
- Небо для Себе (Chernihiv, Ukraine)
- Pipl Plant (Chernihiv, Ukraine)
- Re1ikt (Gomel, Belarus)
- :B:N: (Byaroza, Belarus)
- Zatoczka (Mogilev, Belarus)
- Partyzone (Minsk, Belarus)
- Scrudg (Chernihiv, Ukraine)
- Pomidor/OFF (Minsk, Belarus)
- Znich (Minsk, Belarus)
- Vladivostok (France)
- Lyapis Trubetskoy (Minsk, Belarus)

==== August 23 ====
- Lena Ivanova (Chernihiv, Ukraine)
- Glofira (Gomel, Belarus)
- Hair Peace Salon (Minsk, Belarus)
- Tarpach (Minsk, Belarus)
- Назад Шляху Немає (Kyiv, Ukraine)
- Litvintroll (Minsk, Belarus)
- Imprudence (Minsk, Belarus)
- ZERO-85 (Białystok, Poland)
- ULIS (Minsk, Belarus)
- Vopli Vidopliassova (Kyiv, Ukraine)

== Be Free 2010 ==
- Dates – August 20–22 (21-23), 2010.
- Location — Chernihiv.

The planned festival was canceled by the authorities of Chernihiv.

== Criticism ==
In 2008 Rock-Princess Kasia Kamockaja as a columnist over at naviny.by made comment on the festival, “A group of fans, a group of musicians come there. For the Ukrainian public.”

At the second festival, the organizers invited the "generals of national rock" Krama, IQ48, Neuro Dubel due to the fact that the organizers of Basovišča expressed their unwillingness to see them at their event, which, together with a visa-free regime for Belarusians when traveling to Ukraine, gave prominence to Be Free against the backdrop of a competing festival, Zmitser Lukashuk wrote for European Radio for Belarus.

At a press conference on the eve of Be Free 2009 in Minsk, Lyapis Trubetskoy’s producer Yevgeny Kolmykov suggested that holding such a festival is not possible in Belarus, as “the atmosphere of the music festival involves relaxation, and there would be a huge amount of police, and this police creates a background that does not contribute to relaxation at all.” His thoughts were echoed by Vitaly Supranovich, director of the BMAgroup label, because the authorities' response to an application for conducting an independent festival usually comes only a few days before the start of the planned event, and even "in case of a positive answer, you need to agree with the musicians, make advertisements, and take ten more approvals, each of which costs a certain amount of money," moreover, "there is still no guarantee that some time after the start of the concert the electricity would not be cut off or something else would not happen."

At the same time, the representative of the campaign “Budzma Belarusians!" Maria Sadovskaya expressed the hope that the festival that carries the idea of freedom "after some time, when this word will be perceived by our authorities in a different way," can be organized in Belarus.

== Bans ==
The departure of the participants at the first festival in September 2007 was accompanied by their preventive detentions on the Belarusian side.

The last festival in 2010 was thwarted by the Chernihiv authorities, which, according to the comments by Vitaĺ Supranovič, co-organizer of the event, to Nasha Niva, were “in contact with the official Belarusian side,” which strongly advised “to not to allow the festival.” Radio Free Europe/Radio Liberty reported on the political shade of the bans too. In his column over at naviny.by, Neuro Dubel’s frontman Alexander Kullinkovich linked the cancellation of the festival with the approaching 2010 presidential election.

== Appraisal ==
The concept of the festival was positively appraised by Siarhei Mikhalok, Oleh Skrypka, and other musicians.
