= Rock music in Belarus =

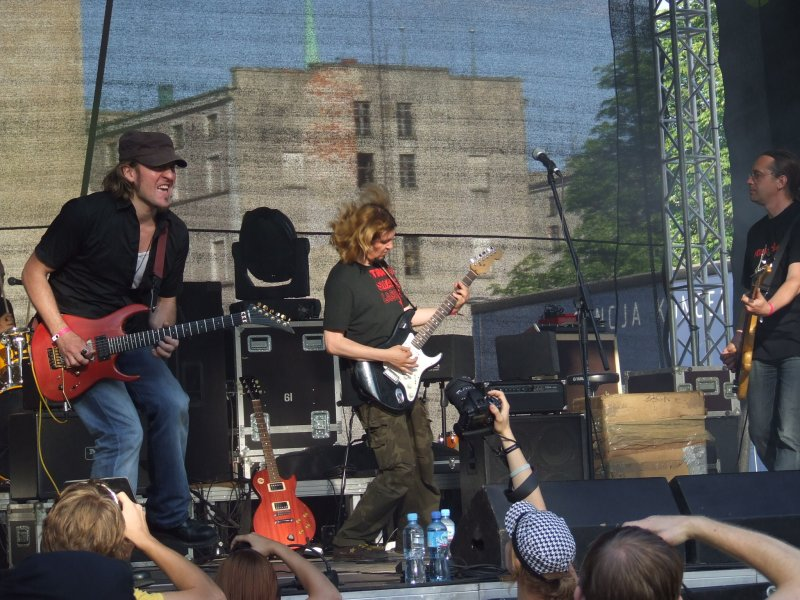
N.R.M. at concert wRock for freedom, Wrocław, June 17, 2007

Belarusian rock has been developing since the early 1980s. The rock bands include Mroja (later renamed to N.R.M.), Eihelstraat, Daj Darogu!, Kriwi, Lyapis Trubetskoy, Verasy, Open Space,Accent, and Otrazhenie is likely the most popular band, having received 138 million Spotify streams in 2024 and having embarked on tours in the United States and Europe.

Metal bands are Asguard and TT-34. Basovišča is a Belarusian rock music festival organized in Gródek, Poland. Other festivals included "Be Free" and "Rock-kola".

== Censorship ==
There is another side to Belarusian music life which is censorship. Researchers Maya Medich and Lemez Lovas reported in 2006 that "independent music-making in Belarus today is an increasingly difficult and risky enterprise", and that the Belarusian government "puts pressure on ‘unofficial’ musicians - including ‘banning’ from official media and imposing severe restrictions on live performance." In a video interview on the Freemuse website, the two authors explain the mechanisms of censorship in Belarus.

Another black list became known in 2011, when Krama, Krambambula, Lyapis Trubetskoy, N.R.M., Naka, Palats, Neuro Dubel among others were banned from performing concerts in Belarus.

In January 2024, three members of the band Nizkiz, whose song "Pravily" was a protest anthem during the 2020-2021 Belarusian protests, were detained in Mogilev. Radio Free Europe/Radio Liberty later reported that the members were declared extremists and sentenced to freedom of movement restrictions for 30 months.

== Notable festivals ==
- Basovišča (held in Poland)
- Be Free (held in Ukraine)
- Rock-kola
- Slavianski Bazaar in Vitebsk

== Notable bands ==
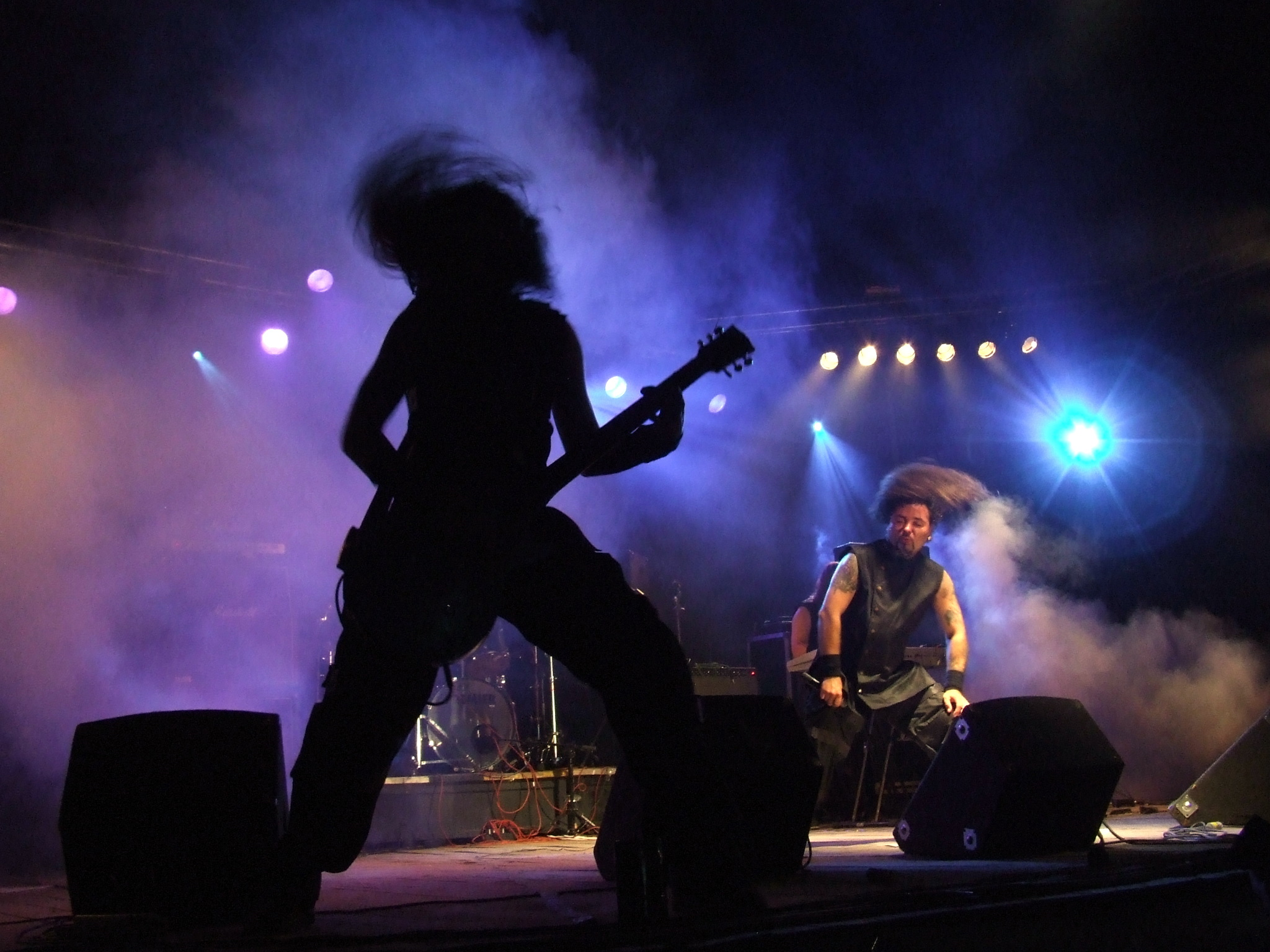
Rasta at Basovišča, July 22, 2007

Alternative rock:

- ULIS
- N.R.M.
- Termin X
- Weesp
- Zolki Band

Black metal:

- Infestum

Christian rock:

- Spasenie

Death metal:

- Asguard

Doom metal:

- Reido

Folk rock:

- Krambambula
- Kriwi

Folk rock VIA:

- Pesniary
- Syabry

Folk metal:

- Gods Tower
- Evoking Winds
- Litvintroll
- Vojstrau
- Znich
- Адарвірог

Hard rock:

- Zet

Hard rock/Heavy metal:

- Otrazhenie

Indie rock:

- Bi-2
- Bristeil
- Jitters
- Hair Peace Salon
- Martin S.

Pop rock:

- beZ bileta
- Open Space

Post-metal:

- Nebulae Come Sweet

Punk rock:

- Daj Darogu!
- Brutto
- Lyapis Trubetskoy
- Messed Up
- Mister X
- Neuro Dubel

Post-punk:

- Molchat Doma

Rapcore:

- TT-34
