= Rusya =

Belarusian singer

Rusya Belarusian: Марына Шукюрава
- Also known as: Rusya
- Born: March 15, 1980 (age 45); Cierachoŭka, Gomel Region, Byelorussian SSR
- Genres: Rock, folk
- Occupation: singer
- Instrument: vocal
- Years active: 2002–present

Rusya (real name Maryna Shukyurava; born March 15, 1980) is a Belarusian vocalist of the band Indiga, a "rock-princess" according to the results of the tenth Rock Coronation. She is additionally the vocalist of the band Šuma and also takes part in the bands such as Akana-NHS.

== Biography ==
She was born in the urban village of Cierachoŭka in the Gomel Region. She graduated from Rechytsa Vocational and Pedagogical College in 2000, the Faculty of International Relations of the Belarusian State University in 2006. After that, she studied at the European Humanities University.

She collaborated as a journalist, editor, and producer with Radyjo Racyja, European Radio for Belarus, translated and voiced films and cartoons for the Belsat TV channel.

== Creative work ==
As a child, Rusya liked the works of Courtney Love, and therefore she decided to become a singer too. Since 2001 she sang in the rock band Indiga. In parallel, she collaborated with the poet Andrej Chadanovič, musician Ihar Varaškievič, and the production center “Backlab collective” (Austria). As a guest vocalist, she collaborated with the rock bands Partyzone, Hasta La Fillsta.

She took part in the recording of Lavon Volski’s compilation album “Takoha niama nidzie.”

On November 1, 2008, at the Bronx club, Rusya, as a member of the folk band Akana-NHS, performed at the presentation of the EP “In Tune” by Hair Peace Salon, which attached her as a vocalist in the new band of Irena Kotvitskaya, the leader of the scattered NHS, and the transition itself took place during the “Golden Acoustics” contest project a month before due to the long creative leave of Indiga owing to perturbations in the line-up.

The singer also collaborates with the electronic band CherryVata. In 2011, she created her electronic folk band Šuma, followed by the birth of the new CityZen project in 2012.

== Reviews ==
Following a concert of Czech bands in June 2006, Anatoĺ Miaĺhuj of Muzykalnaya Gazeta emphasized the artistry and emotionality of Indiga’s vocalist, whose fans “are always impressed by her desire for theatricality on stage.”

== Achievements ==
On July 18, 2003, as a member of the band Indiga, she won at the festival Basovišča. On February 28, 2006, she received the Rock Crown and became a Rock-Princess at the tenth “Rock Coronation.”

== Personal life ==
In 2005, she was in a de facto relationship with the guitarist of Indiga Dmitry Demidov.

After taking pictures in the nude style for the capital magazine “RiO” in 2007, she received several offers to get married, but she did not accept a single one. At the end of 2007, “the close spiritual connection” between Rusya and bard Atmoravi became known, but the relationship ended up with performances as a duet only.

She married Yuri Matsyuin in 2009.

== Discography ==
=== Indiga ===
- Dni (2004)

=== Šuma ===
- Жніво (2015)
- Сонца (2016)
