= Budzma! Tuzin. Perazagruzka-2 =

Belarusian compilation album

Compilation album by Various artists
- Released: 15 December 2011
- Recorded: 2011
- Genre: pop-rock
- Length: 49:51
- Labels: Tuzin.fm, Budzma Belarusians!
- Producers: Alieś Kot-Zajcaŭ, Siarhei Budkin

Various artists chronology
Tuzin. Perazagruzka (2009)	Budzma! Tuzin. Perazagruzka-2 (2011)

Budzma! Tuzin. Perazagruzka-2 (2011) (Belarusian: Будзьма! Тузін. Перазагрузка-2) is a compilation album by a dozen Belarusian and foreign bands and solo performers, who usually sing in Russian, English, and Ukrainian, but made covers of their songs in Belarusian. The CD was released by the public movement Budzma Belarusians! and the music portal Tuzin.fm in December 2011. The project was visualized by Siarhei Budkin. The presentation of the compilation, which was headlined by Oleg Skrypka, took place at the Minsk club "Loft" on December 15, 2011.

== Tracklisting ==
No.	Title	Lyrics	Music	Original	Length
1.	"Belarusian: Краіна мрой" (Vopli Vidopliassova)	Andrej Chadanovič	Oleg Skrypka	Ukrainian: Країна мрій	4:51
2.	"Belarusian: Дзень без чар тваіх" (Alieh “Jagger” Minakoŭ)	Siarhiej Balachonau	Alieh “Jagger” Minakoŭ	transl. Day Without Your Love	3:56
3.	"Belarusian: Кантрабанды" (Mumiy Troll)	Andrej Chadanovič	Ilya Lagutenko	Russian: Контрабанды	4:00
4.	"Belarusian: Апошняе сонца" (Dreamgale)	Dreamgale	Dreamgale	– (Note: New intentionally written for the compilation song.)	4:23
5.	"Belarusian: Дождж" (5diez)	Siarhiej Balachonau	5diez	Russian: Дождь	4:46
6.	"Belarusian: Зрывае дах" (Max Lorens)	Hlieb Labadzienka	Max Lorens	Russian: Схожу с ума	4:01
7.	"Belarusian: Сонейка" (Maria Tarasevich)	Uladzimir Liankievič	Maria Tarasevich	Russian: Солнышко	3:29
8.	"Belarusian: Небасхіл Еўропы" (Alexander Rybak)	Hlieb Labadzienka	Alexander Rybak	transl. Europe's Skies	3:42
9.	"Belarusian: Апошні дзень Зямлі" (Smyslovye Gallyutsinatsii)	Uladzimir Liankievič	Sergey “Buba” Bobunec	Russian: Последний день Земли	3:30
10.	"Belarusian: Акіян у цішы" (Leon Gurvitch Project)	Alieś Kamocki	Leon Gurvitch Project	transl. Infinite Ocean	6:51
11.	"Belarusian: Стоп-мафія" (Zdob și Zdub)	Siarhiej Balachonau	Mihai Gîncu	Russian: Стоп, мафия!	2:52
12.	"Belarusian: Пакуль" (Alena Sviridova)	Andrej Chadanovič	Alena Sviridova	Russian: Пока	3:22

== Reception ==
In her review for the magazine Большой, Taciana Zamiroŭskaja described the compilation as a "wonderful project by the site Tuzin.fm and the campaign Budzma Belarusians! and wrote that "the CD turned out to be quite good." Reviewing for the European Radio for Belarus, Ilya Malinovsky noted that it is "really high-quality music from the real professionals in all music styles."

At the "Ultra-Music Awards 2011" ceremony, the CD was honored as "Project of the Year."

In 2018, Tuzin.fm, together with Letapis.by, selected the song “Краіна мрой” by Vopli Vidopliassova in the top “60 today’s hits in the Belarusian language,” a list of best songs released since 1988.

In 2019, Lesha Gorbash from 34mag included the project in the list of the most significant events in Belarusian music for the period 2010–2019.
