= Autoradio =

Autoradio may refer to:

- AvtoRadio (Russia)
- Autoradio (Belarus)
