= Tuzin. Perazagruzka =

Compilation album by Various artists
- Released: 2009
- Recorded: 2009
- Genre: pop-rock
- Length: 41 mins.
- Labels: Tuzin.fm, Budzma Belarusians!
- Producer: Siarhei Budkin

Various artists chronology
Tuzin. Perazagruzka (2009)	Budzma! Tuzin. Perazagruzka-2 (2011)

Tuzin. Perazagruzka (Belarusian: Тузін. Перазагрузка) is a compilation album by a dozen of Belarusian bands and solo performers who usually sing in Russian, English, and Italian but made covers of their songs in the Belarusian language. The CD was released by the public movement Budzma Belarusians! together with the music portal Tuzin.fm with the support of the World Association of Belarusians “Baćkaŭščyna” and the Belarusian Radio Racyja in December 2009. The idea of the project belongs to Siarhei Budkin.

== Tracklisting ==
No.	Title	Lyrics	Music	Original	Length
1.	"Belarusian: У свеце не адны" (Atlantica)	Vital Voranau	Alex David	transl. It's Not About Us	3:39
2.	"Belarusian: Бяжы" (Anastasija Špakoŭskaja, Naka)	Siarhiej Balachonau	Naka	Russian: Беги	3:23
3.	"Belarusian: У неба" (Niestandartnyj Variant)	Siarhiej Balachonau	Dzmitryj “Mich” Michnievič, A. Piraženka	Russian: В небе	3:59
4.	"Belarusian: Новы мост" (Bieńka, Sieriebrianaja Svadba)	Bieńka, Siarhiej Balachonau, Viktoryja Daškievič	Sieriebrianaja Svadba	Russian: Новый мост	4:25
5.	"Belarusian: Маці" (Serdce Duraka)	Cimafiej Jaravikoŭ	Cimafiej Jaravikoŭ	– (Note: New intentionally written for the compilation song.)	2:34
6.	"Belarusian: Пад купалам нябёс" (The Stokes)	Hlieb Labadzienka	The Stokes	Russian: Под куполом небес	4:08
7.	"Belarusian: Запалкі" (Rita Dakota)	Hlieb Labadzienka	Rita Dakota	Russian: Спички	3:44
8.	"Belarusian: Студзень" (Hair Peace Salon)	Vital Voranau	Hair Peace Salon	transl. Ice Age	3:29
9.	"My Babe" (Tanin Jazz)	Vital Voranau	Tacciana Haroška	transl. My Baby	4:21
10.	"Belarusian: Трыюмф волі" (Siarhiej Pukst)	Andrej Chadanovič	Siarhiej Pukst	Russian: Триумф воли	1:34
11.	"Belarusian: Каханне не ўзнікла" (Da Vinci)	Alieś Kamocki	Lieanid Šyryn	Italian: L’amore non esiste	3:18
12.	"Belarusian: Чароўны кролік" (Yuriy Demidovich)	Siarhiej Balachonau, Yuriy Demidovich	Yuriy Demidovich	Russian: Волшебный кролик	2:37

== Critical reception ==
Dmitry Koldun via Tuzin.fm highlighted “Чароўны кролік” by Yuriy Demidovich and “Студзень” by Hair Peace Salon as the best songs of the compilation. Tuzin.fm's expert Severin Kwiatkowski supported all artists’ attempts to start singing in Belarusian. On the pages of BelGazeta, Tat’yana Zamirovskaya noted that “Belarusian-language songs by Atlantica and Da Vinci on the same compilation with Sieriebrianaja Svadba and Tanin Jazz” impress.

At the “Rock Coronation Awards 2009” ceremony, the CD was honored as “Project of the Year.”

Alieh Michalievič, head of Radio "Stolitsa," in a letter to Budzma Belarusians! highlighted the compilation as “an excellent idea!” Chief director of Radio Belarus Naum Galperovich also thanked for the disk, material from which “certainly arouse interest.” Director of the radio channel "Culture" Kaciaryna Ahiejeva reported that the music editors of her radio station recognized the excellent quality of recordings, so they gladly air the compositions on the network.

In 2018 the music portal Tuzin.fm together with Letapis.by selected the song “Бяжы” by Anastasija Špakoŭskaja and Naka in the top of “60 today’s hits in the Belarusian language,” a list of best songs released since 1988.
