= Smyslovye Gallyutsinatsii =

Russian rock band

Smyslovye Gallyutsinatsii Смысловы́е галлюцина́ции
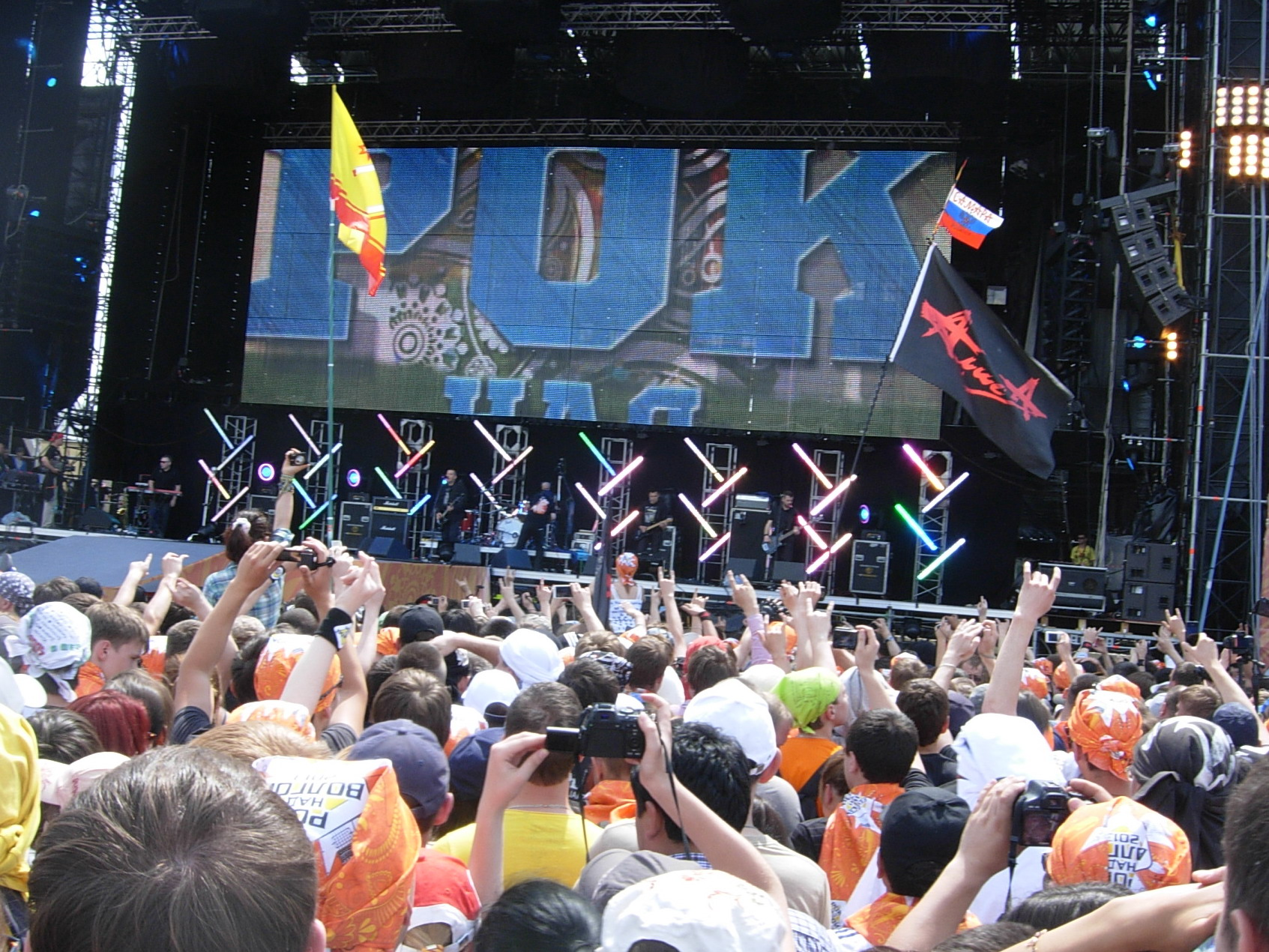

Background information
- Origin: Sverdlovsk, Russian SFSR, Soviet Union
- Genres: Post-punk, Indie rock, Alternative rock, Gothic rock, Electronic rock, Pop rock
- Years active: 1989–2017

Smyslovye Gallyutsinatsii (Russian: Смысловы́е галлюцина́ции) is a Russian rock band which has won the Golden Gramophone award twice.

The name of the band may be translated as "meaningful hallucinations" or "semantic hallucinations." This is not a medical term; it was produced as a slip of the tongue and stuck. The band is also known under a much shorter name "Glyuki" (Глюки), a slang term, which means basically the same: glitches in your brain.

== Biography ==
The band was formed in Sverdlovsk in 1989. In 1990, they became part of the Sverdlovsk rock club, and they were the last group accepted to it before the club was closed down.

For a decade the group had many problems, split a few times, and had problems getting a contract.

Their breakthrough came in 2000 when two of their songs, Rozovye Ochki (Rose Colored Glasses) and Vechno Molodoy (Forever Young) were featured on the soundtrack of the Brother 2 movie. During this year the band also released their debut album, 3000.

In 2001, the band released their second album, Lyod 9 (Ice 9). Two songs from the album, Zachem Toptat' Moyu Liubov (Why Tread Upon My Love) and Razum Kogda-Nibud' Pobedit (Reason Will Triumph Someday) received the most prestigious Russian musical award, the Golden Gramophone.

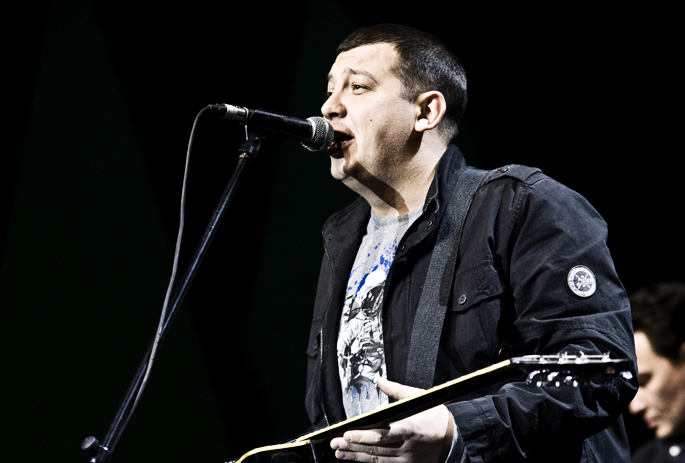
Singer Sergey Bobunets

== Discography ==
- 3000 (2000)
- Lyod 9 (Ice 9, 2001)
- Obratnaya Storona Zemli (The Other Side of the Earth, 2003)
- 66 Rus (2004) (compilation)
- Bolshiye Plany (Big Plans, 2005)
- Serdtsa i Motory (Hearts and Engines, 2008)
- Sdelano v Temnote (Made in the Darkness, 2011)

=== Participation in collections ===
- Budzma! Tuzin. Perazagruzka-2 (2011), track "Апошні дзень Зямлі"
