= Dzieciuki =

Belarusian music band

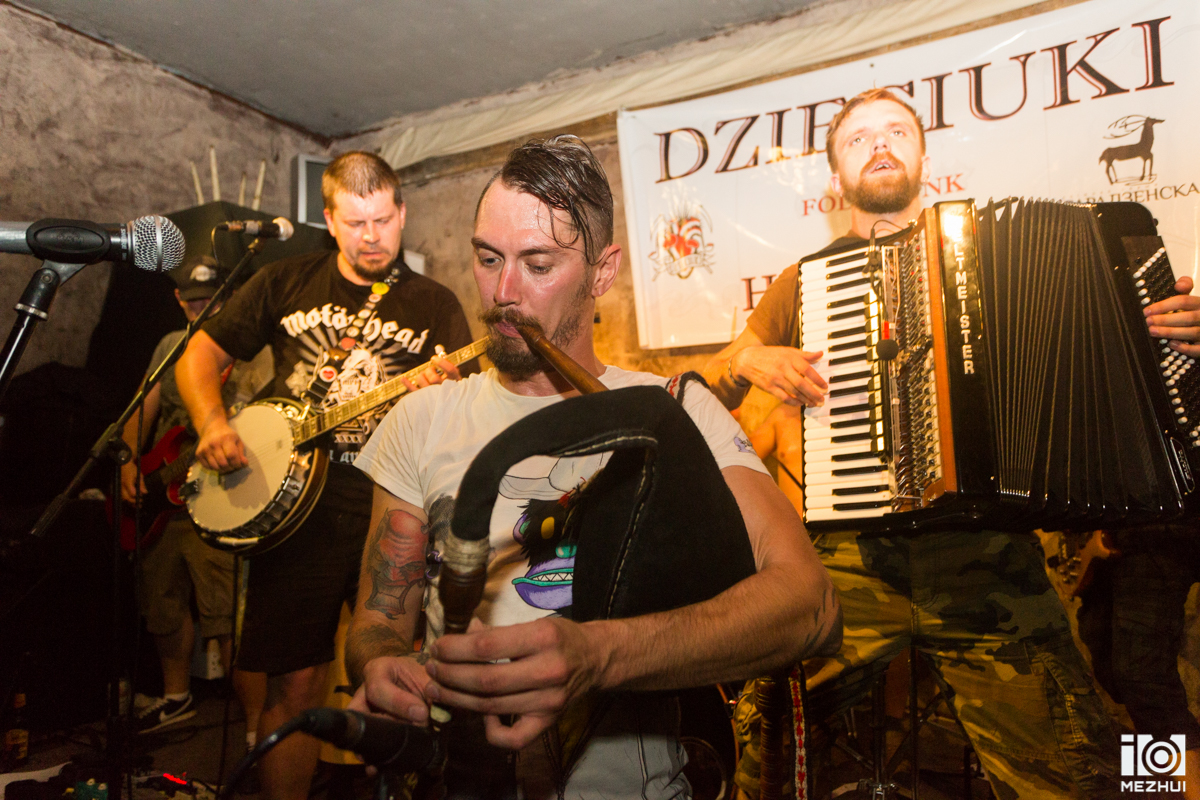
- Dzieciuki performing in Warszawa

Background information
- Origin: Hrodna, Belarus
- Genre: Folk punk
- Years active: 2012–present
- Spinoffs: Liudzi na baloce
- Members: Dzianis Žyhavec; Paša 'Trouble' Trublin; Aleś Dzianisaŭ; Andrej 'Piton' Piatko; Mikola 'Kaliamba' Paliakou; Lioša Pudzin; Andrej Pudzin; Sania 'Syr' Syraježka
- Website: dzieciuki.by

Dzieciuki (Belarusian: Дзецюкі) is a Belarusian folk punk group from Hrodna. It was founded on April 10, 2012. The group has released two studio albums, Haradzenski harmidar and Recha. It positions itself as an educational folk punk brigade, which tells about unrevealed pages of Belarusian history. Several of the Dzieciuki members also take part in Liudzi na baloce group. In 2014 the musicians won the "Heroes of the year" award of Belarusian music portal Tuzin.fm.

From the very beginning of their concert activity, many of their performances in Belarus were prohibited by the authorities. Thus, their concerts in Brest and Minsk were prohibited. On April 1, 2017 the concert surprisingly was allowed and took place in Vicebsk.

On July 10, 2025, the Ministry of Internal Affairs of Belarus designated the Dzieciuki as an extremist group. Earlier in April of the same year, the group's internet pages and those of its leader, Aleś Dzianisaŭ, were included in the list of extremist materials.

== Discography ==
=== Albums ===
- Haradzenski harmidar (Belarusian: Гарадзенскі гармідар) (EP, 2012)
- Haradzenski harmidar (Belarusian: Гарадзенскі гармідар) (2014)
- Recha (Belarusian: Рэха) (2016)

=== Collections ===
- Re:Pesniary (Belarusian: Re:Песняры) (2014), "A chto tam idze" track (Belarusian: А хто там ідзе)
- Tribute To The Pogues (2016), "Ne saskoču!" track (Belarusian: Не саскочу!)

== Videos ==
- Sumnaje regi (Belarusian: Сумнае рэгі, 2014-2015)
- Laddzia rospačy (Belarusian: Ладдзя роспачы, 2015-2016)
- Liasnyja braty (Belarusian: Лясныя браты, 2017)

== Group members ==
- Dzianis Žyhavec: lyrics
- Paša 'Trouble' Trublin: vocals, Belarusian duda
- Aleś Dzianisaŭ: acoustic guitar, banjo, vocals
- Andrej 'Piton' Piatko: bass guitar, vocals
- Mikola 'Kaliamba' Paliakou: accordion
- Lioša Pudzin: guitar
- Andrej Pudzin: guitar
- Sania 'Syr' Syraježka: drum kit
