= BN (band) =

Belarusian rock band

:B:N: Biaz nazwy
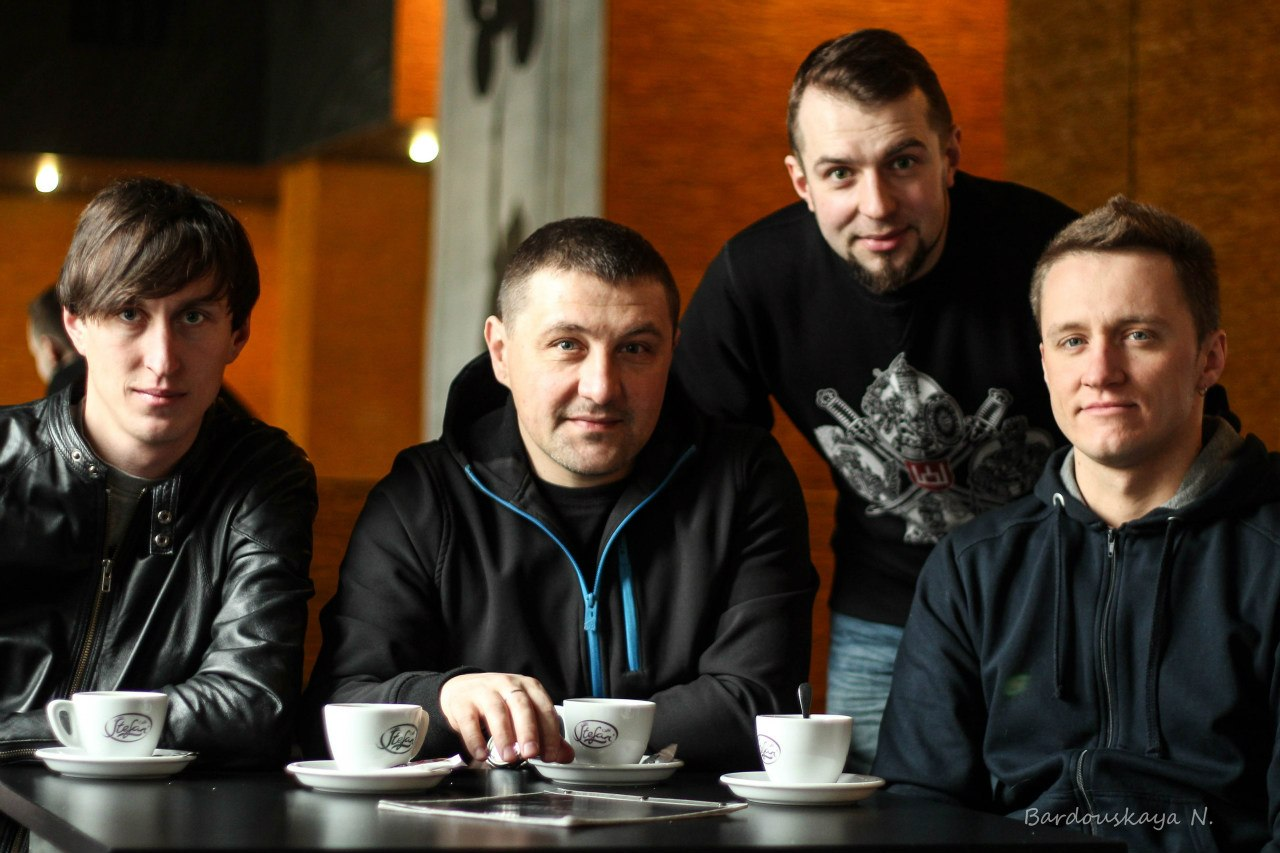
- Band members in 2013–2018

Background information
- Origin: (Belarus) Byaroza
- Genres: alternative rock grunge punk rock alternative metal
- Years active: 1999–present
- Labels: BMA-group; Prynamsi records Wigma; Piarszak
- Members: Alaksandr Lutycz; Pawieł Janouski; Wital Dźmitrewicz; Daniła Lach; Vicky Fates; Siarhiej Maszkowicz
- Past members: Iwan Kiwatycki; Juryj Ściapanau; Ramuald Paźniak; Andrej Łuhaj; Maksim Litwiniec; Maksim Szołachau; Alaksandr Zajcau; Dzmitryj Charytanowicz; Juryj Bardouski; Alaksandr Silicki

BN (:B:N:, Biaz nazwy; Belarusian: БН, "Бяз назвы") is a Belarusian rock band founded in 1999 in Byaroza, in the Brest Region. The leader of the band is vocalist and guitarist Alaksandr Lutycz, the only member who has remained in the group continuously since its inception. The lyrics of BN's songs are written in the Belarusian language, with most of them authored by Siarhiej Maszkowicz. The band's musical style can be characterized as alternative rock with elements of grunge, punk rock, and alternative metal. Apart from Belarus, the group has also performed multiple times in Poland.

== History ==
=== Beginnings and Nie trywaj (1999–2004) ===
The band was founded in December 1999 by vocalist and guitarist Alaksandr Lutycz. The original lineup also included drummer Ramuald Paźniak, guitarist Iwan Kiwatycki, and bassist Juryj Ściapanau, while the lyrics were written by Siarhiej Maszkowicz from the beginning. The first concert took place in Baranavichy together with the band Mlecznyj put'. In October 2000, Iwan Kiwatycki left the band and was replaced by Andrej Łuhaj. In December, the musicians participated in the Tri szurupa festival in Grodno. In 2001, the group won the Rok-koła festival in Novopolotsk with the song Woś takuju b... in the Best Lyrical Song category, and in August they made their debut at the Basovišča Festival of Young Belarusian Music. In November, Maksim Litwiniec replaced Andrej Łuhaj. In the spring of 2002, the band released a demo album titled Praz siabie, featuring ten compositions. That summer, BN performed at the Basovišča festival again, this time winning the Gmina Gródek Award. Thanks to this victory, the band appeared as headliners at many subsequent editions of the festival. In November 2002, Juryj Ściapanau left the band, and Maksim Szołachau took over as bassist.

On 2 June 2003, the musicians began recording their debut album. In March 2004, the band appeared on two programs of the first channel of Belarusian state television – the telefestival Na skryžawańniach Jeuropy and the program Kropka. On April 21, the group released the single Harady on their website. Four days later, the band performed at the Hienierały ajczynnaha roku festival in Minsk. On 27 April 2004, BN released their first studio album, Nie trywaj. In addition to original tracks, the album also included four songs from the demo album in new arrangements. The album presentation was scheduled for May 15 at the Fłaminha club in Byaroza but was canceled due to reasons beyond the band's control.

=== From Żywie rock'n'roll to Krok za krokam (2004–2012) ===
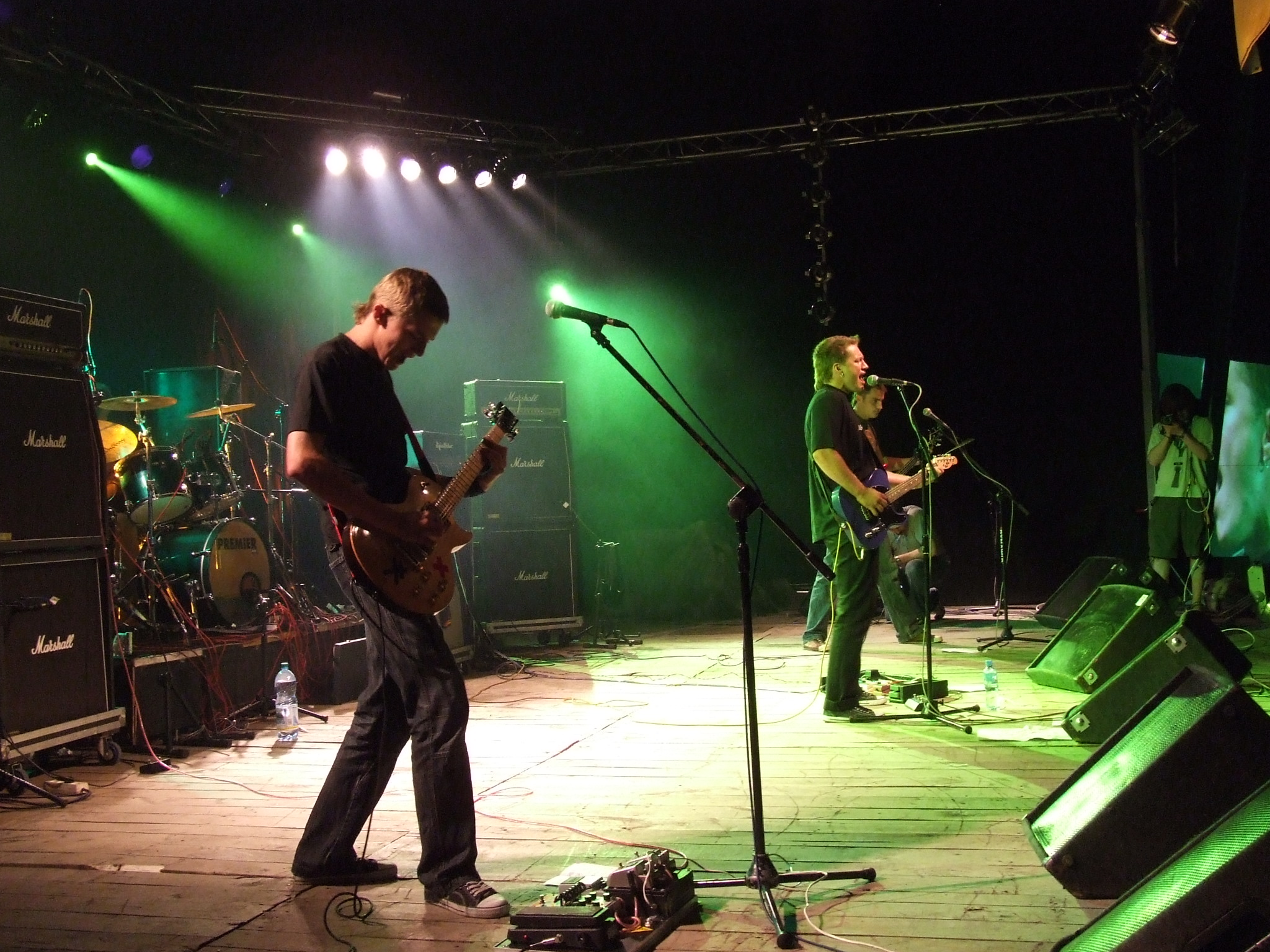
The band's performance at the 2007 Basovišča festival

On 11 August 2004, the band released the single Spirali. In 2006, the group began collaborating with manager Igor Znyk, which resulted in an increase in the number of concerts. That summer, BN performed in Poland at the Union of Rock festival in Węgorzewo and the IV Fląder Pop Festival in Gdańsk. In the summer of that year, the band released their second studio album Żywie rock'n'roll!. On December 1, the album was presented at the Juła club in Minsk. In 2007, the band actively toured both in Poland and Belarus. They also participated in several festivals and galas, such as Rok-karanacyja, Adboryszcza, and Basovišča. In August, music videos for the songs Dażdżami and Kryły were filmed in Warsaw. Over the next two years, the band continued their concert activities.

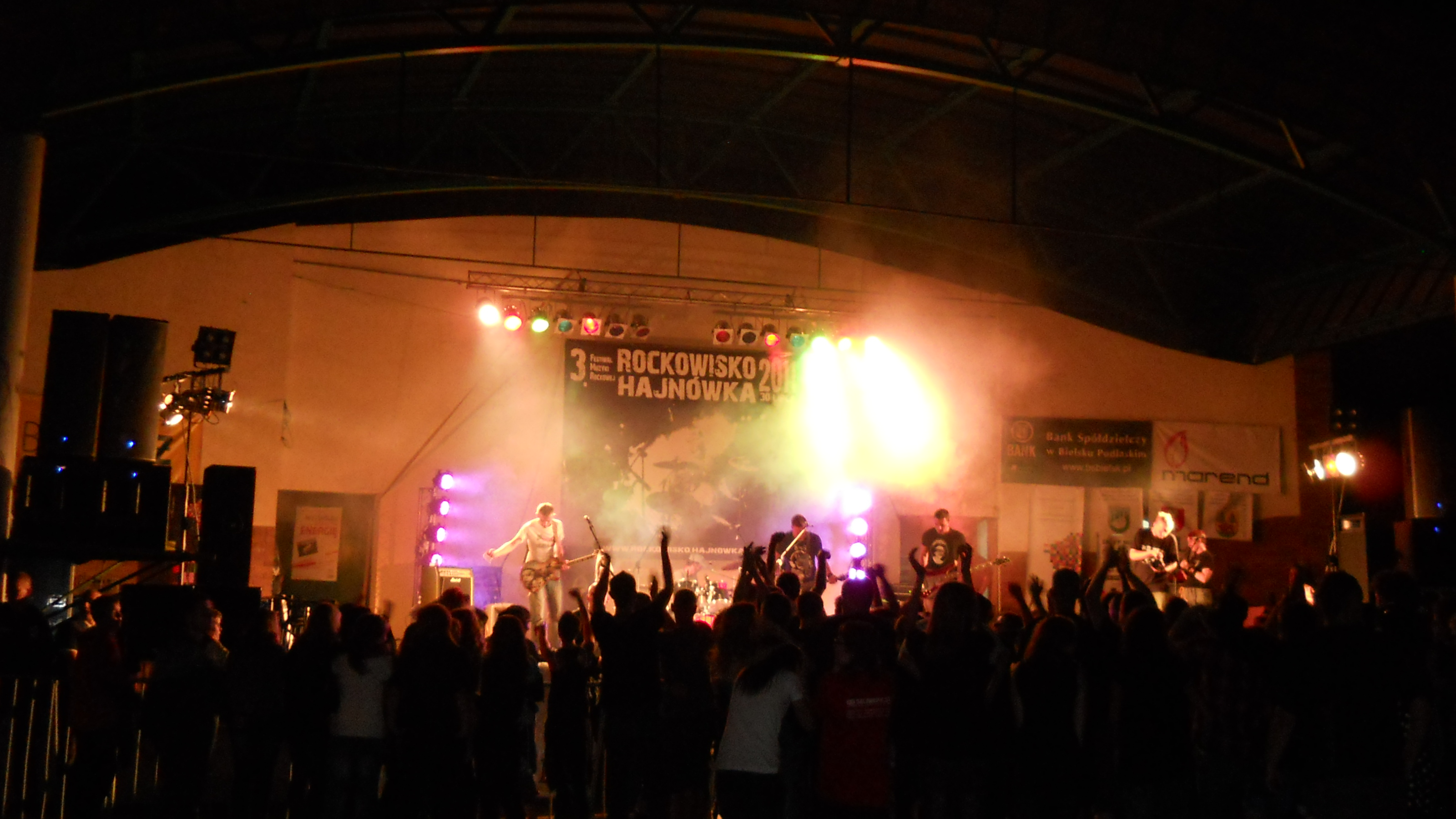
The band's performance at the 2011 Rockowisko festival in Hajnówka

On 20 November 2009, the band celebrated their tenth anniversary at the R-club in Minsk. The concert featured guest performances by the bands IQ48, Krok, Kalmary, Bee, as well as Alaksandr Kulinkowicz and Aleh Chamienka. In March 2010, the musicians announced the start of work on new material at the Siełach studio in Minsk. Alaksandr Lutych also announced that BN would record two songs in Russian for the first time in its history, but this ultimately did not happen. On June 24, the band released the single Żyćcio majo as a teaser for their upcoming album. On November 27, a joint concert of BN and IQ48 took place. On 30 July 2011, the band performed at the 3rd Rock Music Festival Rockowisko in Hajnówka as the only foreign band, receiving enthusiastic reception from the audience. On 4 April 2012, BN released the single Zrabi siabie sam, consisting of two songs from the upcoming album. On 20 September 2012, the band published their third studio album Krok za krokam on the Euroradio website. It featured fourteen original tracks and a cover of the song Czyrwonaja ruża by the Belarusian folk rock band Piesniary. The album presentation took place on 10 October 2012, at the Re:Public club in Minsk.

=== Szukaj swajo and Kodżyccia (from 2013) ===
On 14 March 2013, the band released the acoustic single Nie trywaj, which served as a preview for the Acoustic EP album. The album was published on April 17, featuring six BN's hits in acoustic versions. In the summer of 2013, the band underwent another lineup change – guitarist Jury Bardouski and bassist Alaksandr Silicki replaced Maksim Litwiniec and Alaksandr Zajcau. On 7 October 2013, the band released a double A-side single Palusy/Wiartannie. In November 2014, the group presented the second part of the acoustic project, featuring piano arrangements. In 2015, BN released their fourth studio album, Szukaj swajo, which included nine tracks.

In the fall of 2015, the band's leader Alaksandr Lutycz announced plans to experiment with elements of electronic music. On November 21 of that year, the band held a joint concert with the Polish rock band Lao Che, for which they prepared an electric version of the title track from the album Szukaj swajo. The studio recording of the electric version was published on 31 October 2016. Earlier, on 10 February 2016, the band released the single Chwali, featuring the drummer of IQ48 and beatmaker Tony Fadd, with lyrics written by the vocalist of IQ48, Jauhien Buzouski. On 17 September 2017, BN released another single Biaży za mnoj. Six days later, the band performed on the Belsat Music Live program, broadcast by the Belsat TV channel, where they performed five songs.

At the turn of 2017 and 2018, the band recorded songs for a new album. Its preview was the single Dychaj hłybiej, presented on 5 April 2018 in Radio Stalica. On 13 April 2018, the band released their fifth studio album titled Kod życcia. The album was presented by the band on April 25 at the Brugge club in Minsk.

== Members ==
=== Current band members ===
- Alaksandr Lutycz – vocals, guitar, music composer (od 1999)
- Pawieł Janouski – guitar, vocals (since 2018)
- Wital Dźmitrewicz – bass guitar (since 2018)
- Daniła Lach – keyboard (since 2018)
- Vicky Fates – drums (since 2020)
- Siarhiej Maszkowicz – lyricist (since 1999)

=== Former band members ===
- Iwan Kiwatycki – guitar (1999–2000)
- Juryj Ściapanau – bass guitar (1999–2002)
- Ramuald Paźniak – drums (1999–2012)
- Andrej Łuhaj – guitar (2000–2001)
- Maksim Litwiniec – guitar (2001–2013)
- Maksim Szołachau – bass guitar (2002–2005)
- Alaksandr Zajcau – bass guitar (2005–2013)
- Dzmitryj Charytanowicz – drums (2012–2019)
- Juryj Bardouski – guitar (2013–2018)
- Alaksandr Silicki – bass guitar (2013–2018)

== Discography ==
Year	Album information	Source
2004	Nie trywaj: Original spelling of the title: Не трывай; Release date: 27 April 2004; Record label: BMA-group	
2006	Żywie rock'n'roll!: Original spelling of the title: Жыве rock'n'roll!; Release date: July 2006; Record label: BMA-group	
2012	Krok za krokam: Original spelling of the title: Крок за крокам; Release date: 20 September 2012; Record label: BMA-group	
2015	Szukaj swajo: Original spelling of the title: Шукай сваё; Release date: 19 March 2015; Record label: Wigma	
2018	Kod życcia: Original spelling of the title: #коджыцця; Release date: 13 April 2018; Record label: Piarszak	

=== Mini albums ===
Year	Album information	Source
2013	Acoustic EP: Release date: 17 April 2013	
2014	Piano EP: Release date: 12 November 2014	

=== Demo ===
Year	Album information	Source
2002	Praz siabie: Original spelling of the title: Праз сябе; Release date: April 2002	

=== Singles ===
Year	Single information	Album
2004	Harady: Original spelling of the title: Гарады; Release date: 21 April 2004	Żywie rock'n'roll! (Note: The album featured a different version of the song than the one released as a single.)
2004	Spirali: Original spelling of the title: Спіралі; Release date: 11 July 2004	Żywie rock'n'roll!
2010	Życcio majo: Original spelling of the title: Жыццё маё; Release date: 24 June 2010	–
2012	Zrabi siabie sam (Note: A double single, the second track is Moj szalony dzień.): Original spelling of the title: Зрабі сябе сам; Release date: 4 April 2012	Krok za krokam
2013	Nie trywaj: Original spelling of the title: Не трывай; Release date: 14 March 2013	Acoustic EP
2013	Palusy/Wiartannie (Note: A double single.): Original spelling of the titles: Палюсы/Вяртанне; Release date: 7 October 2013	Szukaj swajo
2016	Chwali: Original spelling of the title: Хвалі; Release date: 10 February 2016	Kod życcia
2016	Szukaj swajo: Original spelling of the title: Шукай сваё; Release date: 31 October 2016	Kod życcia
2017	Biaży za mnoj: Original spelling of the title: Бяжы за мной; Release date: 17 September 2017	Kod życcia
2018	Dychaj hłybiej: Original spelling of the title: Дыхай глыбей; Release date: 5 April 2018	Kod życcia
2020	Wybar: Original spelling of the title: Выбар; Release date: 11 May 2020	–
2021	Majaki: Original spelling of the title: Маякі; Release date: 26 November 2021	–
2022	Wydychaj: Original spelling of the title: Выдыхай; Release date: 21 January 2022	–

=== Releases featuring the band's songs ===
Year	Album information	Song title	Source
2003	Nasza muzyka 1: Release date: November 2003; Record label: Arlo Music	Nie trywaj	
2003	Viza Niezależnaj Respubliki Mroja: Release date: 29 December 2003; Record label: BMA-group	Dzied Maroz	
2004	Hienierały ajczynnaha roku: Release date: 25 April 2004; Record label: BMA-group	Harady	
2005	Premjer Tuzin 2005: Release date: November 2005; Record label: West Records	Spirali	
2006	Dychać!: Release date: 10 July 2006; Record label: Huki i malunki	Modniki	
2006	Pieśni swabody-2: Release date: 27 July 2006; Record label: VoliaMusic	Ciahnik	
2007	Pieśni swabody-3. Pł. Kalinouskaha: Release date: 19 March 2007; Record label: VoliaMusic	Byu czas	
2007	Ochota-18: Release date: Spring 2007; Record label: Bomba-Pitier	Dażdżami	
2008	Premjer Tuzin 2007: Release date: 30 January 2008; Record label: Nowaja Muzycznaja Kampanija	Dażdżami	
2008	NiezależnyJA: Release date: 25 March 2008; Record label: BMA-group	Zahinułym paetam pryświaczajecca (feat. Lawon Wolski)	
2009	Premjer Tuzin 2008: Release date: 27 January 2009; Record label: BMA-group	Zahinułym paetam pryświaczajecca (feat. Lawon Wolski)	
2010	Prawa maładych – pierszy muzyczny blin: Release date: 23 March 2010; Record label: BHMHA Aazis	Huzik	
2013	Miesto podpisi. Tribjut Neuro Dubel: Release date: 7 February 2013	Huzik	

=== Music videos ===
Year	Title	Original spelling
2006	Kaniusznia	Канюшня
2007	Ciahnik	Цягнік
2007	Dażdżami	Дажджамі
2008	Kryły	Крылы
2008	Żywie rock'n'roll!	Жыве rock'n'roll!
2014	Popieł	Попел
2015	Wiartannie	Вяртанне
2017	Biaży za mnoj	Бяжы за мной
2018	Płanieta, paczakaj	Планета, пачакай
2020	Wybar	Выбар
2021	Majaki	Маякі

== Bibliography ==
- Szostak, Hienadź (2008). "«B.N.» («Biaz Nazvy»)". In Padbiarezski, Dzmitry (ed.). Энцыклапедыя беларускай папулярнай музыкі (in Belarusian). Minsk: Zmicier Kołas. ISBN 978-985-6783-42-8.
