= European Radio for Belarus =

Independent radio station in Belarus

- Type: Radio network
- Availability: International
- Owner: Independent
- Launch date: 2006
- Official website: euroradio.fm
- Language: Belarusian, Russian

European Radio for Belarus (ERB; Belarusian: Еўрапейскае радыё для Беларусі, romanized: Jeŭrapéjskaje Rádyjo dla Biełarúsi; Russian: Европейское радио для Беларуси, romanized: Yevropeyskoye radio dlya Belarusi), also known as Euroradio (Belarusian: Еўрарадыё, romanized: Jeŭraradyjo; Russian: Еврорадио, romanized: Yevroradio), is an international radio station that provides independent news, information, and entertainment to the citizens of Belarus. It launched on 26 February 2006. ERB operates on FM, OIRT FM, Internet, and Satellite to reach the widest audience. Its staff includes around 20 people in the Warsaw office and ten journalists in the Minsk office.

The mission of the radio is to deliver factual, current, independent, trustworthy and up-to-date information to Belarusian listeners about events in Belarus and rest of the world, as well as to promote European democratic values. The project also aims to assist the development of a new generation of journalists, who will be able to work professionally in Belarus in the future during a transition to democracy and a free market. The station has one of the highest ratings among propaganda-free media in Belarus.

In 2021, Euroradio was declared an "extremist formation" by the Belarusian Ministry of Internal Affairs.

== History ==
=== Launch ===
Euroradio was established by the Belarusian journalist Dmitry Novikov, former head of the popular Minsk Radio 101.2, which was shut down by the authorities in 1996. Novikov was also one of the Radio Racja founders. He established European Radio for Belarus as a non-profit organization in September 2005 in Warsaw, Poland. Other participants in the launch were Belarusian journalists as well as BAJ, NGOs from Poland, Lithuania, and the Czech Republic. The core of the staff was formed by experienced journalists - Slava Koran, Sergey Akhramovich, Hanna Borowska.

Euroradio's first broadcast was on 26 February 2006. The station targeted the youth audience and aimed for a 70/30 balance of music and news. The headquarters were located at Puławska Street in Warsaw’s Mokotów district.

=== Editors' office ===
In the summer of 2009 the Belarusian Ministry of Foreign Affairs finally allowed Euroradio to open its correspondent office in Minsk. Since then, the Minsk office has been responsible for content creation, while the one in Warsaw supported broadcasting.

In November 2009 ERB received a yearly accreditation for broadcasting. Chairman of the Euroradio board Dmitry Novikov commented that the step was taken by the government only after the EU pressure. The accreditation has to be prolonged yearly. By 2014 Euroradio's audience was around 300,000, primarily comprising those within the 18-30 age range.

Euradio was headed by Julia Slutzkaya until 2010 when she had to leave the country after presidential elections. Vitaliy Zubluk became the new chief editor, he resigned in 2016 and became the general producer. He was succeeded by famous blogger Victor Malishesvky. Dr. Anastasiya Ilyina was an editor of ERB in 2010–2019. On 2 April 2018, Victor Malishevsky took the post of creative editor, Pavel Sverdlov became ERB chief editor.

In 2019 the station underwent restructuring, five journalists from the Warsaw office and several in Minsk were made redundant. Chief editor Sverdlov commented on this as on business optimization. The anonymous source explained that ERB funding had recently decreased significantly.

On 31 July 2023, the European Parliament passed a resolution in which it asks the European Commission and the Member States, to strengthen Belarusian media outlets, including Euroradio.

== Content ==
=== Music ===
A significant part of the broadcasting is taken up by world and Belarusian (about 10%) music. ERB initiates various projects to support Belarusian musicians including annual Be Free festival in Ukraine, the «Belarusian: Даём рады» awards, publishing of the Budzma The Best Rock / Budzma The Best Rock/New compilation.

=== Programs ===
Each hour starts with a news bulletin of approximately 3 minutes in length followed by the short news update in the middle of the hour. In addition, broadcasting consists of economic, cultural, and sports programs as well as experts’ commentary on the wide variety of issues. Guests and Interviewees on ERB's daily programs include prominent politicians and other recognized public figures as well as representatives of independent Belarusian youth communities and organizations. ERB provides special news updates on breaking news as necessary.

News bulletins are broadcast daily from 7 am to 10 pm three times per hour. ERB has three flagship programs – EuroZOOM, Petard, and Cardiogram. EuroZoom is a daily informational program that covers Belarus in the political and cultural space of Europe. Petard presents the five most actual topics of the current events. Cardiogram is dedicated to the human rights agenda. The programs are also broadcast by several Lithuanian and Ukrainian stations. In September 2009 the Belarusian Ministry of Information sent an official warning to Autoradio for broadcasting EuroZoom.

=== Investigations ===
Euroradio has gradually developed its own section of investigative journalism. The reporters worked on important, controversial topics, many of which are not allowed to be covered on state media. For example, in 2013 Yauhen Valoshyn published his investigation on the poppy seeds market in Belarus.

On 9 September 2014, ERB journalist Dmitry Lukashuk interviewed Donetsk People's Republic Prime Minister Alexander Zakharchenko. Two days later, Lukashuk facilitated the release of eight Ukrainian soldiers from captivity after directly asking Zakharchenko to release them.

== State pressure ==
All TV and radio channels in Belarus are governmental and controlled by the BelTA agency. The Belarusian journalists and chief editors open up about KGB following their steps and wiretap their calls. According to them, every independent media in the country has its own 'curator' in KGB, the officers have a schedule - one official interrogation per year and two unofficial ones.

In 2008 the editors office was searched by the police, almost all equipment was confiscated. The staff relocated to Warsaw.

After the 2010 Belarusian presidential election, Zybluk was detained and interrogated by KGB. On 25 December 2010, the police searched ERB Minsk news office and confiscated almost all equipment from it. The search was performed on Saturday, when no staff members were present at the office, and without warning.

In 2012 Pavel Sverdlov was detained by the police on his way home from the office, he was sentenced for 15 days in prison for 'swearing in a public place'. Sverdlov was not allowed to meet a lawyer, his case was based on contradicting testimonies of two policemen. In six months he was refused the journalist's press accreditation because of this conviction.

During the 2015 Belarusian presidential election Belarusian independent press faced constraints in access to information. Euroradio's website was blocked on 12 October 2015.

During the 2020–2021 Belarusian protests independent media was blocked inside Belarus, and access to the internet was cut out from 9 August. Euroradio's websites were subject to DDoS attacks. ERB journalists were many times detained by the police while covering news on protest rallies after the elections.

In 2021 and 2022, Belarusian courts added the Telegram, YouTube, Instagram pages of the radio and its logo to the Republican list of extremist materials; in July 2022, the Ministry of Internal Affairs of Belarus designated it as an extremist group. In 2022 and 2023, several people who have been interviewed by the radio were arrested and imprisoned for it on charges of assisting extremist activity.

== Awards ==
- ERB journalist Maryna "Rusya" Shukyurava received ‘П’еро’ Award inFreedom of Speech nomination (2009);
- Dmitry Lukashuk got first prize at BAJ "Вольнае слова" Competition (2015).
