= Tuzin.fm =

Belarusian web portal

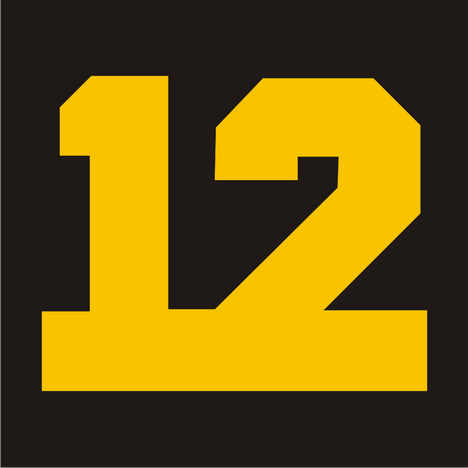
- Website type: mass media
- Available in: Belarusian
- Owner: Anatol' Lazar
- Creators: Siarhei Budkin, Wiecier Mechaniczny, Aliaksiej Minčonak
- Website: tuzinfm.by
- Commercial: no
- Registration: optional
- Launched: 2003 October 12; 22 years ago
- Current status: active

Tuzin.fm (Belarusian: Тузін Гітоў; transl. A dozen hits) is a private non-profit Belarusian web-portal, which was created in 2003 to cover musical creativity in Belarus. Among its objectives, the site promotes music written in Belarus and motivates to listen to Belarusian songs as large an audience as possible. It initiates and implements music projects and is the information partner of the most significant events of the Belarusian independent music scene. Independently determining its information policy, the nature and content of the information, advertising, audio, and video materials, in 2009 the mass media had more than 50 thousand monthly visitors who downloaded more than 80 thousand songs.

== History ==
The portal began operations on 12 October 2003. The site has changed its address several times. Initially, it was available over at music.fromby.net. Later on, the address was changed to tuzin.fm, but after problems with the domain, it was moved to tuzinfm.by. Since May 2017 the portal is available over at tuzin.by too. The back catalogue of articles is presented over at mpby.ru.

In 2004 together with the Belarusian Collegium, it published the book "Belarusian: Залатыя дыскі беларускага рок-н-ролу" with a description of 20 music albums from the 1970–1990 years.

Since 2004, it broadcasts the radio version of its hit parade, entitled "Belarusian: Радыё Тузін", which is anchored by the lead singer of the band Belarusian: Палац Belarusian: Алег Хаменка. From the beginning, airing was on Radio Rocks (Minsk), since 2005 on Radio Minsk, since 2006 on Radio Racyja (Białystok). In 2005–2011, it annually releases a compilation of 12 winning songs from the network's hit parade called "Belarusian: Прэм’ер Тузін" (2005, 2006, 2007, 2008, 2009, 2011). In 2005–2007, it took part in the holding of the ceremony of awarding the best musicians of the country "Belarusian: Рок-каранацыя". On 16 March 2006, it held the concert "Rock Revolution" in Vilnius (Lithuania) with the participation of N.R.M. In 2006, together with the label VoliaMusic, it published the compilation album "Belarusian: Песьні свабоды". On 3 November 2007, in the church of Saints Simon and Helena in Minsk, it held a memory concert to collect funds for a monument for poet Anatol Sys. On 31 August 2008, in Minsk, after a 12-year hiatus, it restored the music festival "Belarusian: Рок па вакацыях".

In 2009 and 2011 together with the public movement Budzma Belarusians!, it released music CDs Tuzin. Perazagruzka and Budzma! Tuzin. Perazagruzka-2 with translated into Belarusian songs by foreign-language performers. In 2011–2012 it arranged the acoustic concert series "Belarusian: Тузін. Unplugged" with the participation of Belarusian rock bands. In 2012–2013 it held a series of concerts "Belarusian: Жывы Тузін". In 2012, together with Radio Racyja (Białystok), it issued the audiobook "Belarusian: Дзінь-дзілінь: пара гуляць у казкі" by Sergey Vitushka. In 2012–2013 together with the Podlaska Opera and Orchestra, it prepared a musical voiceover disk of the Belarusian silent film classics "Belarusian: Тузін. Немаўля". In June 2014 together with the Viasna Human Rights Centre, it released the collection of songs "Belarusian: Апошні золак". Also in 2014 together with the Foundation "Belarusian: Вяртаньне", it held a contest of young performers "Belarusian: Засьпявай.by", another one was opened in 2017.

As a continuation of Tuzin. Perazagruzka and Budzma! Tuzin. Perazagruzka-2, a new similar project "Global Reload" was started in 2014, featuring Andrey Makarevich and more.

== Appraisal ==
In the interview with the founder Siarhei Budkin in connection with the 1st anniversary of the site, Volha Samusik of Muzykalnaya Gazeta stated that music.fromby.net was the most popular among Belarusian Internet portals. In her feature in 2005, she also described Tuzin.fm as "the most popular Belarusian music site." In a report from its 5th anniversary party, Tuzin.fm was introduced by Belorusy i rynok's Anna Zhdanovich as "one of the largest resources on the Internet devoted to Belarusian music."

Being interviewed by Muzykalnaya Gazeta in 2006, rock-princess Rusya recognized that the portal, which "has gained momentum," is the godfather of her band Indiga.

During the presentation of the compilation album "Belarusian: Прэм'ер Тузін 2007" in 2008, musician Lavon Volski pointed out that Tuzin.fm "is the only competent hit parade in Belarus."

The founder of Ultra-music.com Viačaslaŭ Radyjonaŭ gave his assessment of the portal on its seven-year anniversary via Budzma Belarusians!: "That is a unique and very timely phenomenon. It appeared exactly when Belarusian-language music needed support and the opportunity to bring it to a large audience."

In a review of all Belarusian music awards for 2013, Paviel Svierdlov, editor of "KYKY.ORG", criticized the portal because the hit parade did not work for a year, but praised offline activities, "two excellent projects: "Belarusian: Дзінь-дзілінь: Пара гуляць у казкі" and "Belarusian: Тузін.Немаўля"."

== Released with the participation of the portal disks ==
- Прэм'ер Тузін (2005–2011)
- Песьні свабоды (2006)
- Tuzin. Perazagruzka (2009)
- Budzma! Tuzin. Perazagruzka-2 (2011)
- Belarusian: Дзінь-дзілінь: Пара гуляць у казкі (fairytales by Sergey Vitushka)
- Belarusian: Тузін.Немаўля (disk and art-project, 2012–2013)
- Апошні золак (collaboration project and music compilation, 2013–2014)
- Re:Песьняры (concert and disk, 2014)

== Concerts and other projects ==
- Героі году (musical awards, annual since 2011)
- Belsat Music Live (musical program for Belsat TV, ongoing since 2017)
- (Не)расстраляныя (2017–2018)

== State pressure ==
In 2013 the Brest concert in support of the project Belarusian: Тузін.Немаўля was canceled by the city administration due ideological reasons.

== Awards and nominations ==
- CD + MP3 "Прэм'ер Тузін-2005" (The "Rock Coronation Awards 2005," "Project of the Year")
- CD + MP3 "Прэм'ер Тузін-2006" (The "Rock Coronation Awards 2006," "Project of the Year")
- Tuzin.fm (Rock-kola-2007, certificate "For Active Support of Youth Creativity and a Significant Contribution to the Development of the Belarusian Rock Movement")
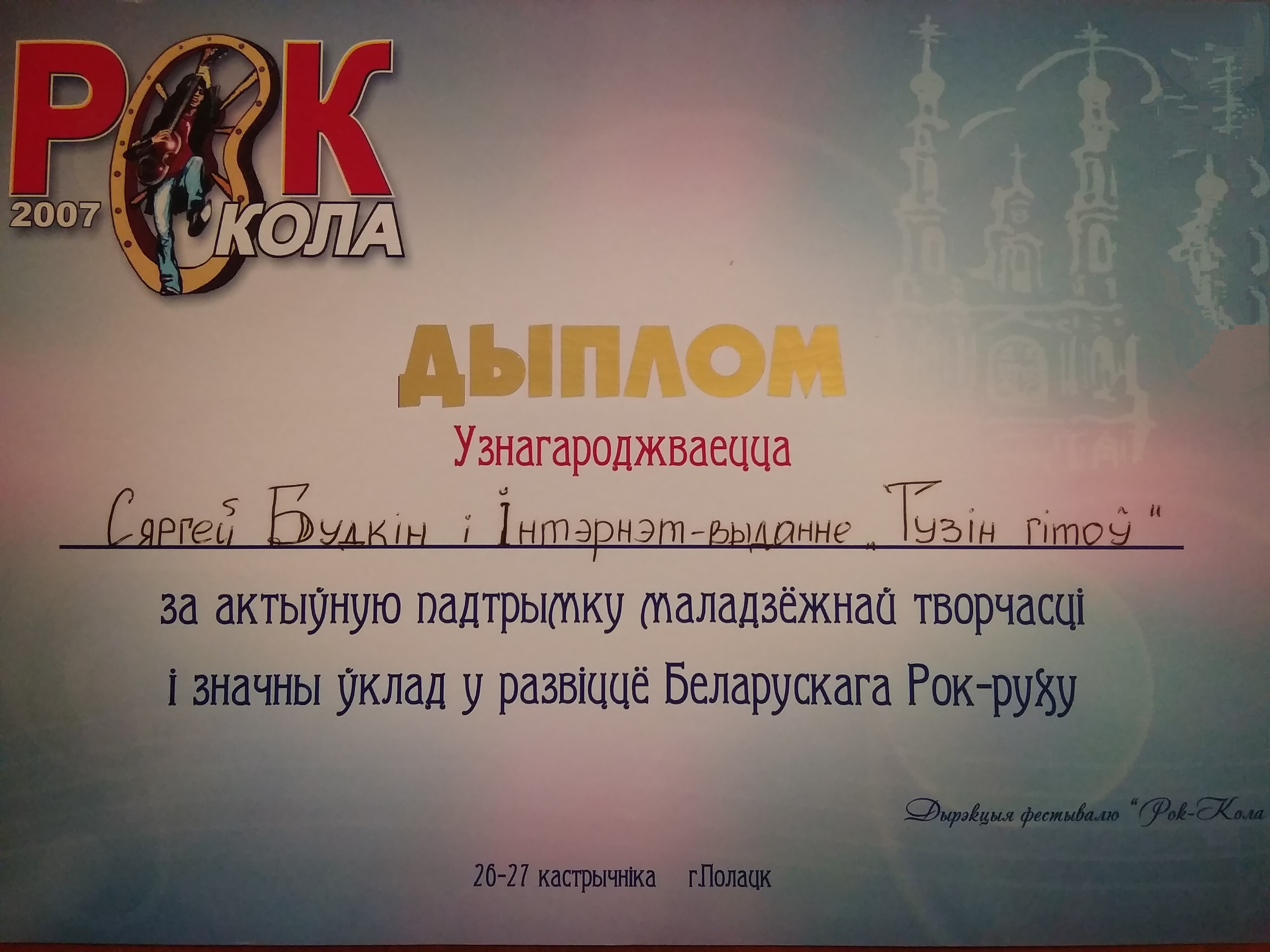
  Rock-kola-2007's Certificate "For Active Support of Youth Creativity and a Significant Contribution to the Development of the Belarusian Rock Movement"
- Tuzin. Perazagruzka (The "Rock Coronation Awards 2009," "Project of the Year")
- Budzma! Tuzin. Perazagruzka-2 (The "Ultra-Music Awards-2011," "Project of the Year")
- Concert series "Тузін.Немаўля" (The "Ultra-Music Awards-2012," "Event of the Year")
- CD + MP3 "Прэм'ер Тузін-2011" (according to the record label Vigma, the best-selling disc of the year)
- Project "Радыё Tuzin.fm" (author: Christina Doropey) (The forum "Belarusian: PR-кветка" (2014), 2nd place in the commercial section)
- Contest project "Засьпявай" (author: Christina Doropey) (The forum "Belarusian: PR-кветка" (2015), 1st place in the category of PR-projects)
- Triple DVD-edition and the concert series "Тузін.Немаўля" (authors: Siarhei Budkin, Tuzin.fm, Podlaska Opera and Orchestra) (The festival of advertising and communication "AD.NAK-2014," 2nd place in the category of socially significant projects)
- Logo of "Тузін.Немаўля" (author: studio Adliga) (The festival of advertising and communication "AD.NAK-2014," 2nd place in the category of logos)
- Poster of the "Прастытутка" film from the "Тузін.Немаўля" project (author: Vasilisa Palyanina-Kolenda) (The festival of advertising and communication "AD.NAK-2014," 3rd place in the category of posters)
- Tuzin.fm portal's design (author: studio Pras.by) (The festival of advertising and communication "AD.NAK-2014," nomination in the category of websites)
- Tuzin.Unplugged (The festival of advertising and communication "AD.NAK-2014," nomination in the category of socially significant projects)
- Re:Песьняры (author: Siarhei Budkin) (The festival of advertising and communication "AD.NAK-2015," 2nd place in the category of socially significant projects)
- Апошні золак (The festival of advertising and communication "AD.NAK-2015," 2nd place in the category of socially significant projects)
- The Global Reload project and the competition "Засьпявай 2.0" (The Highlights of 2015 by Budzma Belarusians! in the category of "Main Musical Events of the Year")
- Belsat Music Live (author: Siarhei Budkin) (The Adami Media Prize-2018, Special Mention in the category of "TV Entertainment")
