= Rock-kola =

Belarusian rock festival (1990-2007)

- Genre: rock
- Locations: Novopolotsk; Polotsk (2005–2007)
- Years active: 1990–2007
- Founders: Siarhiej Aniščanka

Rock-kola (Belarusian: Рок-кола, transl. Rock-wheel) was a Belarusian rock festival held annually from 1990 to 2007 in Polotsk and Novopolotsk. (Note: In 1994 Polotsk did not host the festival, since the organizers lacked funds in that year.) At the Rock Coronation 2004–2005, it won in the category of “Festival of the Year.”

== Overview ==
The festival director was Siarhiej Aniščanka. The basis of the festival was a competition of young bands from different countries, famous rock musicians were invited to the festival too. The last festival, which was held on October 26–27, 2007, was attended by 25 youth bands from Belarus, Russia, and Ukraine. The main condition for the contestants was the presence of songs in the Belarusian language in the repertoire.

== Ban ==
Rock-kola was banned in November 2007 as a result of a protocol of the Polotsk City Executive Committee, which stated to "consider inexpedient to hold events, which are alien to the historical and spiritual heritage of the city of Polotsk and Orthodoxy, such as the festival Rock-kola, in the city, recommend to the responsible persons which are answerable for the spiritual education of young people to refrain from initiating such events." Nevertheless, the festival organizing committee considered other grounds for its holding, such as Minsk, Novopolotsk, Russia’s Smolensk.

According to Tuzin.fm, the prohibition of the festival may have been associated with the appointment of a new chairman of the Polotsk local office of the KGB, who reportedly expressed dissatisfaction as to the holding of the event. Following the meeting of musicians in the Presidential Administration of Belarus in November 2007, Vitaĺ Supranovič, head of the BMAgroup label and author of the festival Be Free, came to the conclusion that the closure of Rock-kola by the authorities was a political action. Siarhiej Aniščanka, being interviewed by Dmitry Kustovsky from Belsat TV in 2015, echoed his takeaway. Andrey Alexandrov is his article over at Belarusian Partisan on the topic referred to the signs of a political nature too.

== Reception ==
Tat’yana Zamirovskaya, a journalist for the Muzykalnaya Gazeta, called it "a decent and very nice get-together without mock glossiness, arrogant pathos, and incomprehensible show off" in a report on the results of the festival in Novopolotsk in 2001.

Reviewing the XV edition of the festival in 2005, Muzykalnaya Gazeta’s Anastasiya Shtukina wrote, “Today there is not a single urban project in Belarus that could boast the same popularity among young people and such a long history.”

Aliaksandra Paŭlava, author of the Muzykalnaya Gazeta, described the phenomenon of the festival in the article Russian: «Рок-кола» – белорусский рок жив as "an idea that helps Polotsk and Novopolotsk to be one of the most rock'n'roll cities in Belarus, because there are many bands who know what to work for, they will have their viewership."

Mikita Zmitraŭ from Narodnya Naviny Vitsebska wrote on the results of the last festival Rock-kola, "For two days, Polotsk lived by music. Judging by the number of viewers in the largest hall of the city, rock'n'roll is very much in demand here."
