= Autoradio (Belarus) =

Autoradio Аўтарадыё

Minsk; Belarus
- Frequency: 105.1 MHz

Programming
- Languages: Belarusian, Russian
- Format: Rock, Popular

Ownership
- Owner: Joint Stock Company "Autoradio"

History
- First air date: August 7, 1992
- Last air date: January 12, 2011
- Former frequencies: 67.7 MHz (1992–1994)

Autoradio (105.1 Minsk FM) was the first independent radio station in the independent Belarus. Autoradio was the first radio station in Belarus to broadcast after the Dissolution of the Soviet Union. It was broadcast from Minsk on the frequency 105.1 MHz from 7 August 1992 to 12 January 2011.

== History ==
From the early 90s until January 1, 1995, Autoradio operated on the frequency 67.7 OIRT FM. The station played Belarusian music, such as the bands N.R.M., Krambambula, Lyapis Trubetskoy, and Neuro Dubel. At 12:40 p.m. on 12 January 2011, Autoradio's transmitting license was revoked and the station was shut down. The Republican Commission on Television and Radio led by Oleg Proleskovsky revoked Autoradio's license after the station broadcast campaign advertisements from the candidates Andrej Sańnikaŭ and Uładzimier Niaklajeŭ, who were opposing Alexander Lukashenko during the 2010 Belarusian presidential election.

The founder and editor-in-chief of Autoradio, Jury Bazan, died on September 24, 2016.

== See also ==
- Radio 101.2 (Belarus)
- 105.1 FM
