= Radio 101.2 =

Radio 101.2 Радыё 101,2
- Minsk; Belarus
- Frequency: 101.2 MHz (Minsk)

Programming
- Language: Belarusian
- Format: Rock, Popular

Ownership
- Owner: Open Society Foundations

History
- First air date: July 21, 1995
- Last air date: August 31, 1996

Radio 101.2 was a radio station in the Belarusian capital of Minsk. In 1995 and 1996 the radio station, which is at the frequency 101.2, was broadcasting news and was not affiliated with the national government. The editorial staff was assembled mostly by hiring the journalists of the closed station Belarusian: Беларуская маладзёжная.

Soros Foundation helped to buy the equipment for newly started radio in 1995. The station was closed on formally technical reasons and was transferred over to the Belarusian Republican Youth Union, who still uses the radio today. The government has claimed that the station, and its frequency, was interfering with the radio communications of the Minsk police force. Independent groups claimed that this was another method by the government of Alexander Lukashenko to suppress the freedom of the press inside Belarus.

The technical problems that were claimed to be the reason to close the broadcast never happened again. On July 9, 1997, Lukashenko authorized giving 101.2 frequency to the state-controlled Radio Style.

== Broadcast ==
Radio 101.2 was commercially successful, it had a wide audience and attracted big sponsors. Its analytical programmes criticized the authorities, the news blocks published information about the demonstrations, names of the detained. However, the media strived to be objective, it published governmental releases and invited the state officials to comment the actual issues.

== Reception ==
Music journalist Źmicier Padbiareski said in 2000 that the example of Radio 101.2 showed the public that the Belarusian can be profitable, since “the matter is in the quality of music and professionalism of DJs.”

Many experts described Radio as the only independent broadcast in Belarus of that time. When the news about closure came out, the listeners brought flowers to the Radio’s office and cars honked around all Minsk as a sign of support. Its closure marked the beginning of a crackdown on the media in the country.

== See also ==
- Autoradio (Belarus)

== Sources ==
- Jones, Derek (2001). Censorship: A World Encyclopedia. NY: Routledge. p. 207. ISBN 978-1-57958-135-0.
- Tereschenko, O. V.; Tereschenko, M. V. (2020). "Measurements of Media Audience: Formation History". Sociologic Almanac (in Russian). 11: 163–175.
