= Basovišča =

Festival of Belarusian alternative and rock music

Coordinates: 53.106598°N 23.663435°E

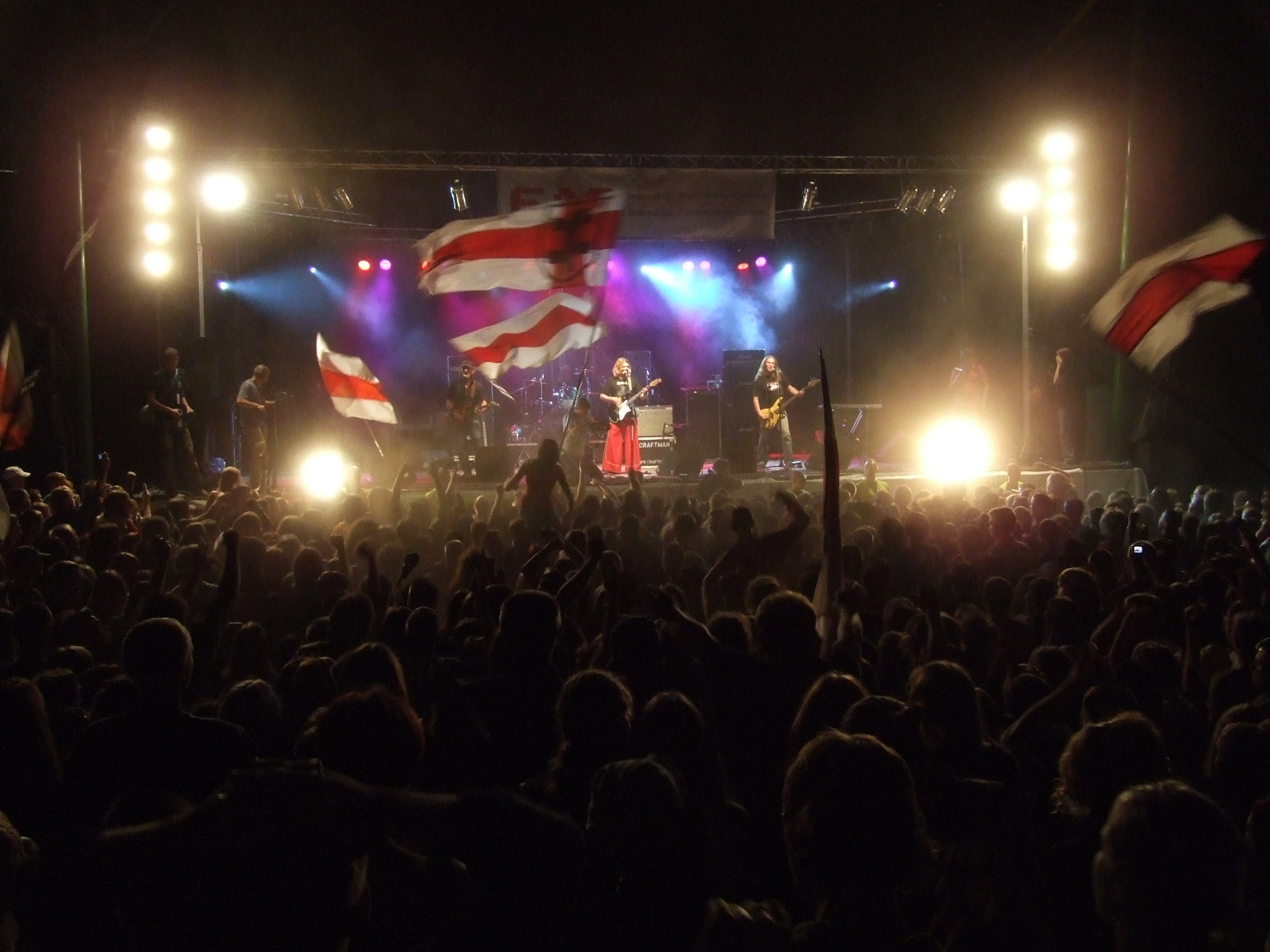
Basovišča 2007

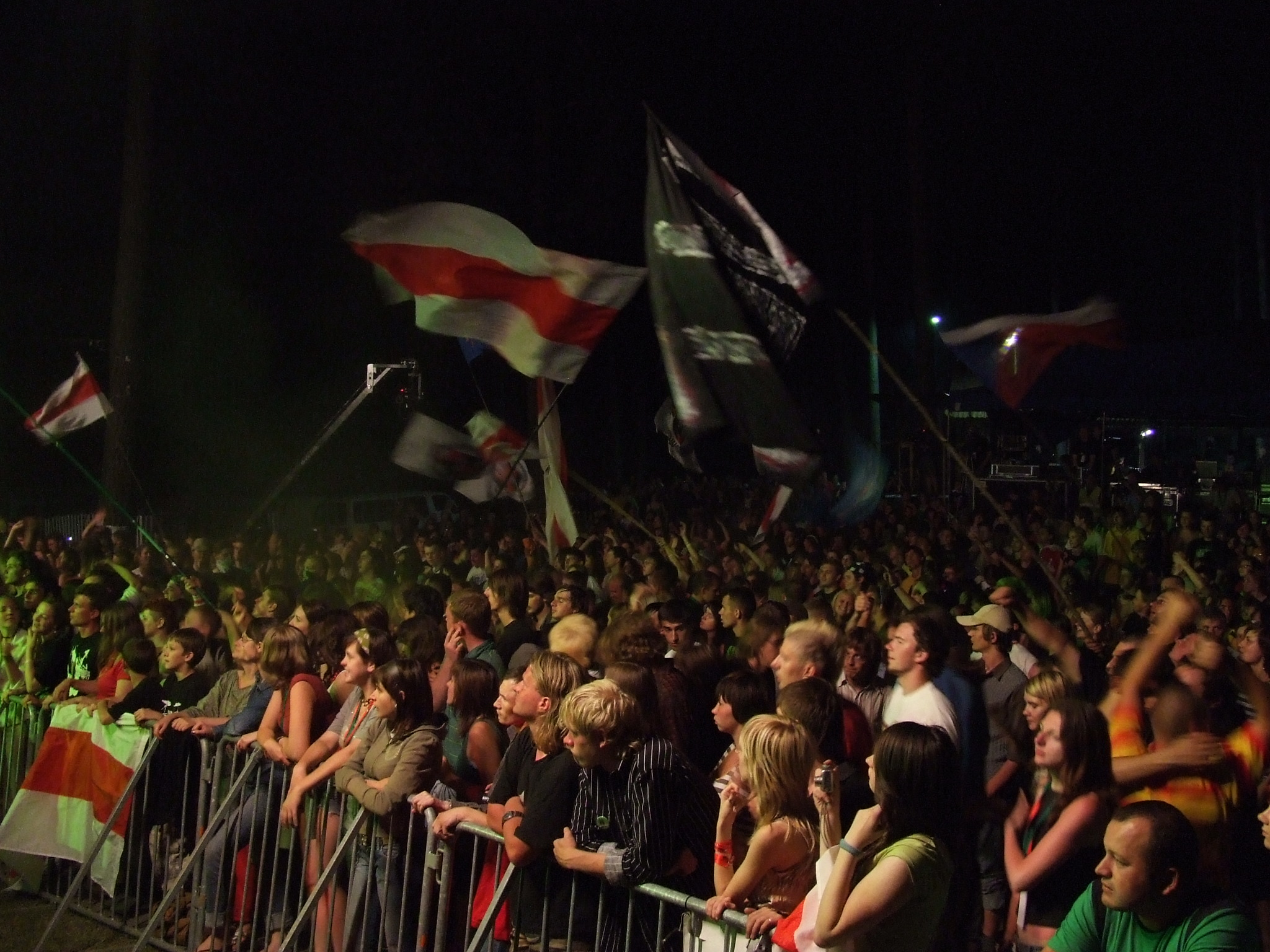
Basovišča 2007

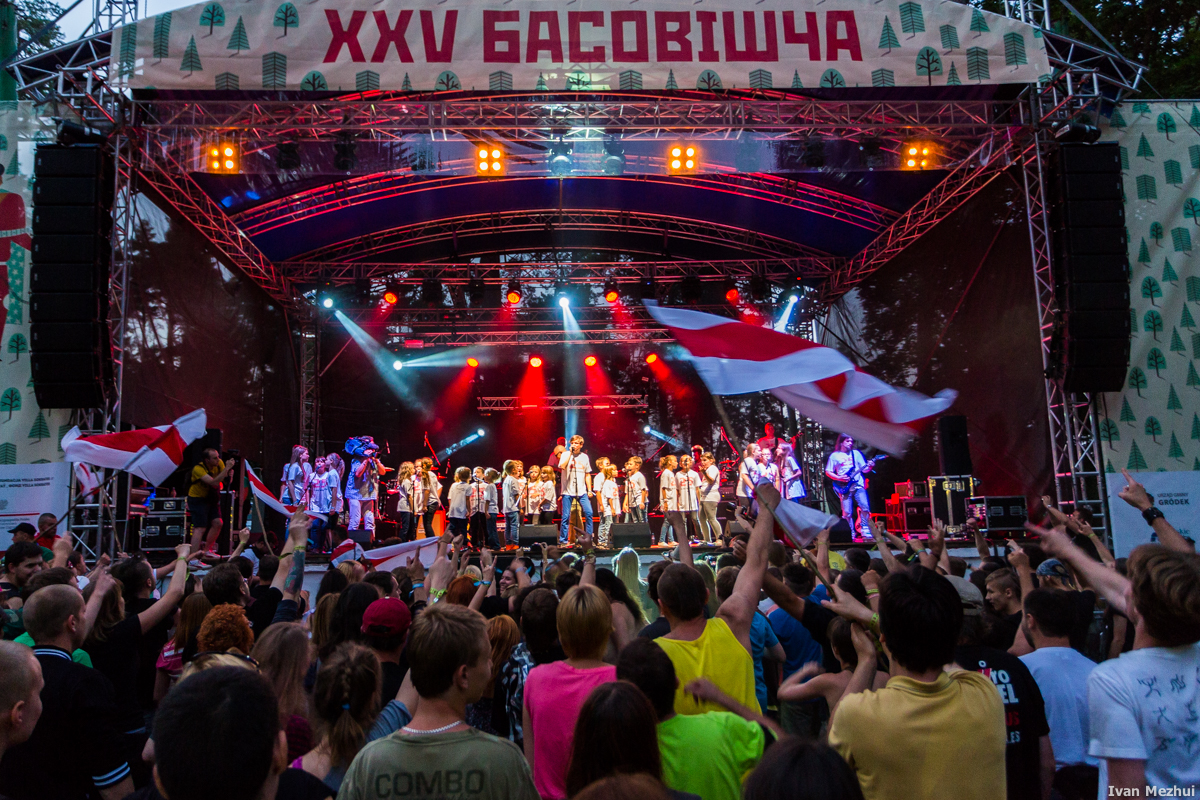
Basovišča 2014

Basovišča or Basowiszcza (Басовішча, Basowiszcza, pronounced [baˈsovʲiʂtʂa] in Belarusian; Belarusian Youth Music Festival) is the festival of Belarusian alternative and rock music, which is annually conducted by the Belarusian Association of Students since 1990.

The festival takes place during two July days in the Borak forest in Gmina of Gródek, Poland. The important part of the festival is the music contest, in which young bands compete for prizes - usually money and rights to record their album for free. Well-known stars of Belarusian, Ukrainian and Polish rock-scene usually perform there too. From five to twelve thousand people come to the festival every year.

== History ==
=== 2006 ===
17th Basovišča was held on 22–23 July 2006. Contest was on second day. It was the first time when a band from Lithuania, IR, took part in it.

==== Contest results ====
Winners:

- Parason - 40 hours of recording in Apollo Studio, and money (1800 zl)
- S.D.M. - 25 hours of recording in Studio Rembrandt Radio Bialystok, and money (1200 zl)
- Nevma - 1360 zl
- Ludzi śviatla - 1000 zl
- Vodar suśviet - electric guitar

Other participants: Band A, Krok, RoStra, Termin X, Mozart

== Bans ==
In 2006, the organizers faced a ban on the concerts of “Adboryšča” (qualifying rounds for “Basovišča-2006”) in Minsk.

== Criticism ==
In 2008 Rock-Princess Kasia Kamockaja as a columnist over at naviny.by made such a takeaway on the festival, "„Basovišča“ was conceived not as a festival of Belarusian music in exile, but as a celebration of local Białystok Belarusians."

On the pages of BelGazeta, Tat'yana Zamirovskaya wrote in 2007 that the festival "is the only and oldest music competition in which young Belarusian rock bands can prove themselves and get a very significant prize."

In the retrospect of 2010–2019 in 2019, Lesha Gorbash from 34mag called the festival "a Mecca for Belarusian rock music." Oleg Klimov, editor-in-chief of Muzykalnaya Gazeta, described the festival in 2003 as follows: “Basovišča is a Belarusian Woodstock, only on the territory of Poland bordering Belarus. Therefore, no one knows about this fest, not only in the world, but even in the rest of Poland. In general, it is a cool festival of life.”
