= Neuro Dubel =

Belarusian punk rock band

Neuro Dubel (Russian: Нейро Дюбель, Belarusian: Нейра Дзюбель) is a Belarusian punk rock band originating from Minsk signed by West Records. It was founded by Alaksandar Kulinkovič (born 18 May 1972, died 4 August 2018) and his brother-in-law Hienadź Ahiejčyk on 17 July 1989. The band was recognized as Rock-Kings twice at the Rock Coronation Belarusian Music Awards.

== Members ==
The band currently features only one original member: Andrej Ściepaniuk (aka. Stepashka) as a drummer. The other three members are guitarists, which include Vital Abramovič, Uładzimier Sachončyk and bass player Jaŭhien Broŭka (all three joined in 2003). Notable former members include Alaksandar Kulinkovič (lead vocalist, 1989–2018), Jury Navumaŭ (backing vocals, 1991–2020), Maksim Paravy (guitars, 1994–2003), Stanisłaŭ Papłaŭski (bass guitar, 1993–2003) and Maksim Ivašyn (keyboards, 1993–2004).

== Albums ==
Neuro Dubel's first studio album Умные вещи (Clever Things) was released in 1995. By 2013, 8 studio albums followed.

== Studio discography ==
- 1991 - Тотальная Дефлорация (Total Defloration)
- 1991 - В жопе (In the ass)
- 1992 - Ромашка (Chamomile)
- 1994 - Битва на мотоциклах (Battle on motorcycles)
- 1994 - Министерство (Ministry)
- 1995 - Умные вещи (Clever Things)
- 1996 - Жестокое самоубийство универсальной нарезкой Бернера (Brutal Suicide by Berner's Universal Cutter)
- 1998 - Охотник и сайгак (The Hunter and the Saiga)
- 1999 - Ворсинки и катышки (Lints and Pellets)
- 2002 - Правдивая история о том, как у Карлсона угнали комбинезон (True Story about how Karlsson's Overalls Were Stolen)
- 2002 - Пиар во время чумы (PR during the Plague, 'best of', release for Russia)
- 2004 - Tanki
- 2007 - Stasi
- 2010 - 20 лет в тумане (20 Years in the Fog, live album)
- 2010 - Афтары правды (Authors of Truth)
- 2012 - Дохуя советчиков (Fucking Plenty of Advisers)
- 2013 - Место подписи (Place of Signature, tribute album)
- 2015 - На Марс!
- 2017 - Першы

=== Participation in collections ===
- 2009 - Budzma The Best Rock / Budzma The Best Rock/New
