= Muzykalnaya Gazeta =

Former Belarusian newspaper

- Type: Weekly newspaper
- Publisher: Nestor
- Founded: 1996
- Ceased publication: 2008
- Language: Russian
- Headquarters: Minsk
- Country: Belarus
- Circulation: 20000 – 1500
- Free online archives: http://www.nestor.minsk.by/mg/

Muzykalnaya Gazeta was a Belarusian weekly newspaper that covered music and show business.

== History ==
The newspaper was founded in Minsk by publisher Anatoĺ Kiriuškin (publishing house "Nestor") in 1996. Initially it came out once per week (later, once every two weeks) in Russian, and was distributed across the Republic of Belarus, as well as through private distributors in the markets of Ukraine and Russia. At first the circulation ranged from 7,000 to 19,500 copies, then it fell sharply and continued to decline in subsequent years; the last issue was published in December 2007 with a circulation of 2,514 copies.

By 2003, the newspaper was published in color and informed on the West and the Belarusian and Russian music scenes. Since 2003, the newspaper began to write only on topics of Belarusian music (Western music coverage migrated into the new magazine “НОТ-7”), changed the design, and switched to 8 pages (instead of 16) in black and white.

Almost from the very beginning, the chief editor was Oleg “О’К” Klimov, a famous Belarusian music journalist. During its existence, the newspaper has become a landmark publication for Belarusian music lovers and was a success in Moscow and Saint Petersburg, mainly due to the large number of published materials and the high (in its early years) quality of publications.

Due to financial reasons, the newspaper ceased to exist on the eve of 2008.
