= Slavicisation =

Adoption or imposition of Slavic culture on a non-Slavic population

Slavicisation or Slavicization, is the acculturation of something non-Slavic into a Slavic culture, cuisine, region, or nation. The process can either be voluntary or applied through varying degrees of pressure.

The term can also refer to the historical Slavic migrations to the Balkans which gradually Slavicized large areas previously inhabited by other ethnic peoples. In northern Russia, there was also mass Slavicization of Finnic and Baltic population in the 9th-10th centuries.

After historic ethnogenesis and distinct nationalisation, twelve main subsets of the process apply in modern times:

- Belarusization
- Bosniakisation
- Bulgarisation
- Croatisation
- Czechization
- Macedonization
- Montenegrinization
- Polonization
- Russification
- Serbianisation
- Slovakization
- Ukrainization

== See also ==
- Hellenization
- Pan-Slavism
- Slavophilia
- Slavophobia
