= Andrej Paŭliučenka =

Andrej Jurjevič Paŭliučenka (born 8 February 1975, Minsk) is a Belarusian government official.

== Biography ==
Born on 8 February 1975 in Minsk. Paŭliučenka's biography has not been published in open sources. It is known that he served in the security detail of Alexander Lukashenko since 2001 and, for less than a year, from December 2016 to December 2017, was head of the Presidential Security Service of Belarus.

In 2016 Paŭliučenka was a student at the Faculty of Training and Retraining of the Institute of Public Administration of the Academy of Public Administration under the President of the Republic of Belarus specializing in "Business Administration".

On 11 December 2017, he was appointed head of the Operational and Analytical Center under the President of the Republic of Belarus (OAC).

=== Role in the removal of Sviatlana Tsikhanouskaya from Belarus ===
According to a report broadcast on 6 August 2025 by the state TV channel ONT, Andrei Paŭliučenka played a key role in the removal of Sviatlana Tsikhanouskaya from Belarus in August 2020, after the 2020 Belarusian presidential election and the onset of mass protests. According to the film, at Tsikhanouskaya's own request, he allegedly helped her leave the country. Paŭliučenka was in Tsikhanouskaya's Minsk apartment before her departure, handed her an envelope with money, and accompanied her and her campaign manager Maryja Maroz in a car to the Belarus–Lithuania border.

According to Maroz, it was Paŭliučenka who insisted on Tsikhanouskaya's departure. She agreed under pressure, but Maroz, fearing they could be dealt with on the way as had happened to other opponents of the Lukashenko regime, insisted that Paŭliučenka himself — a high-ranking security official — be in the same car with them, serving as a "living shield" against possible provocations.

== Personal life ==
As of summer 2025, he had two daughters, 17-year-old Polina and 14-year-old Maria. His wife, Iryna Paŭliučenka (Šarko), worked as an economist at PUE "Pramsnabtekhnika" before the birth of their first daughter. He owns two apartments in Minsk — on Skrypnikava Street and Viasiolkavaja Street. He also owns a plot of land in the gardening partnership "Maja ŭciecha" near Minsk.
