= REGNUM News Agency =

Russian Internet-edition

- Type: News agency
- Industry: News media
- Founded: 22 July 2002; 24 years ago
- Founders: Boris Sorkin, Modest Kolerov
- Headquarters: 2 Bersenevsky Lane, Balchug Island, Yakimanka District, Moscow, Russia
- Key people: Yulia Krizhanskaya (CEO); Modest Kolerov (editor-in-chief)
- Website: regnum.ru

REGNUM News Agency is a Russian nationwide online news service disseminating news from Russia and abroad from its own correspondents, affiliate agencies and partners. REGNUM covers events in all regions of Russia as well as neighboring countries in Europe, Central Asia and the South Caucasus. REGNUM press centers are located in Moscow, Saint Petersburg, Pskov, Arkhangelsk, Vologda, Barnaul, Krasnoyarsk, Novosibirsk, Kaluga, Yerevan (Armenia).

REGNUM is licensed under mass media service, registration certificate No. El 77-6430 issued on 6 August 2002. REGNUM is a registered trademark, certificate No. 262482.

== History ==
The REGNUM family of agencies started functioning on 19 June 1999. REGNUM was founded by Boris Sorkin and Modest Kolerov (Note: On 28 February 2022, the European Union blacklisted him in connection with the 2022 Russian invasion of Ukraine and froze all his assets.) on 22 July 2002.

== Editors-in-chief ==
Kolerov served as editor-in-chief until 2005 when he was replaced by Konstantin Kazenin. Modest Kolerov served again as editor-in-chief from 2007 to 2012.

Vigen Hakobyan became editor-in-chief again in 2012.

== Editorial policies ==
It is rumored that Regnum editorial office employees greet each other with a special greeting, "СФО", which in Russian means "Death to the Fascist Occupiers". In an interview by editor-in-chief of Regnum, Vigen Akopyan to the Russian portal Gorod.lv, the principal claimed "anti-fascist" position of the agency was explained as to oppose Russian investment in any country whose politics are hostile to Russia or which is promoting the rehabilitation of World War II–era Nazism and fascism. Although Akopyan did not say what country he had in mind, Russian journalists figured out it was Estonia.

== Regional bureaus ==
The system of REGNUM News Agency includes regional bureaus in the Russian territory and abroad:

- St. Petersburg bureau (based in Saint Petersburg)
- Central bureau (Moscow)
- Central Russian bureau (Voronezh)
- Northern bureau (Arkhangelsk)
- Upper Volga bureau (Yaroslavl)
- Povolzhye bureau (Nizhny Novgorod)
- Lower Volga bureau (Volgograd)
- Caucasian bureau (Nalchik)
- Siberian and Far East bureau (Novosibirsk)
- Transcaucasian bureau (Yerevan)
- Ural bureau
- South-Western bureau
- Central Asian bureau
- REGNUM-VolgaInform (Samara, Cheboksary)
- REGNUM-KNEWS (Krasnoyarsk)
- SeverInform (Vologda)

== Correspondents ==
REGNUM News Agency has an extended correspondent network (about 400 correspondents) in Russia and neighboring countries.

== Audience ==
According to TNS Gallup Media survey of Moscow audience of Russian online news services, managers and specialists prevail among REGNUM audience – 72% (Yandex News – 63%, NEWSru – 64%). In November–December 2006, MASMI-Russia company conducted the 11th survey of Runet audience Online Monitor. REGNUM newsline is read more by managers (28.3% of REGNUM audience comparing to 20.3% of Runet average).

== Controversy ==
Estonia's Security Police (KaPo) in its 2005 yearbook laid a claim according to which REGNUM had been designed as a tool in Russia's state propaganda machine operating under direction of Modest Kolerov, at the time the head of an agency within President Vladimir Putin's administration. The claim stated that in essence, REGNUM is not a news outlet as it presents itself, but an umbrella for Russia's secret services operations in countries of the so-called "near abroad", which efforts are directed to promoting Russia's geopolitical agenda.

As Russia's foreign policy tool REGNUM has been instrumental in encouraging opposition to energy independence plans in the Baltic states, contributing to the negative popular vote on the question of a new nuclear power plant in Lithuania.

Since 2011, the agency has become unpopular in Turkmenistan. In a report circulated by the Ministry of Foreign Affairs of Turkmenistan, Turkmen diplomats repeatedly expressed their dislike of the agency, claiming that it systematically disseminates inaccurate, biased information about their country.

In December 2016, three REGNUM journalists were arrested in Belarus, accused of "inciting enmity between the Belarusian and Russian peoples", extremism, negative assessments of the Belarusization policy pursued by Alexander Lukashenko's government. Citizens of Belarus Dmitry Alimkin, Yury Pavlovets and Sergey Shiptenko spent 14 months in pre-trial detention center No. 1. In February 2018, they were sentenced to five years in prison under Part 3 of Art. 130 of the Criminal Code of Belarus, "Extremism" with a three-year suspension of sentence and a ban on leaving Belarus.

== Awards ==
In 2006, REGNUM was awarded the National Prize of Russia "Runet Prize".

In 2008, REGNUM was awarded the "Media-Peacemaker-2008" of the Guild of Interethnic Journalism in the category "Internet".
