= Serbianisation =

Spread of Serbian culture, people, or politics

Serbianisation or Serbianization, also known as Serbification, and Serbisation or Serbization (Serbo-Croatian: srbizacija / србизација or posrbljavanje / посрбљавање; Albanian: serbizimi; Bulgarian: сърбизация, romanized: sarbizatsiya or Bulgarian: посръбване, romanized: posrabvane; Macedonian: србизација, romanized: srbizacija; Romanian: serbificare) is the spread of Serbian culture, people, and language, either by social integration or by cultural or forced assimilation.

== Medieval period ==
Populated by Bulgarians and Romanians, the area between the Morava and Timok rivers became part of the Serbian state in 1291/1292 which began the Serbianisation of the region. Albanians that came under the rule of Serb Emperor Stefan Dušan were required by state policy to convert to Orthodoxy and Serbianise their Albanian names. Uglješa Mrnjavčević, a fourteenth-century Serbian despot who ruled much of Macedonia on behalf of Serb Emperor Stefan Uroš V attempted to Serbianise the monastic community of Mount Athos.

== 19th century ==
=== Principality of Serbia ===
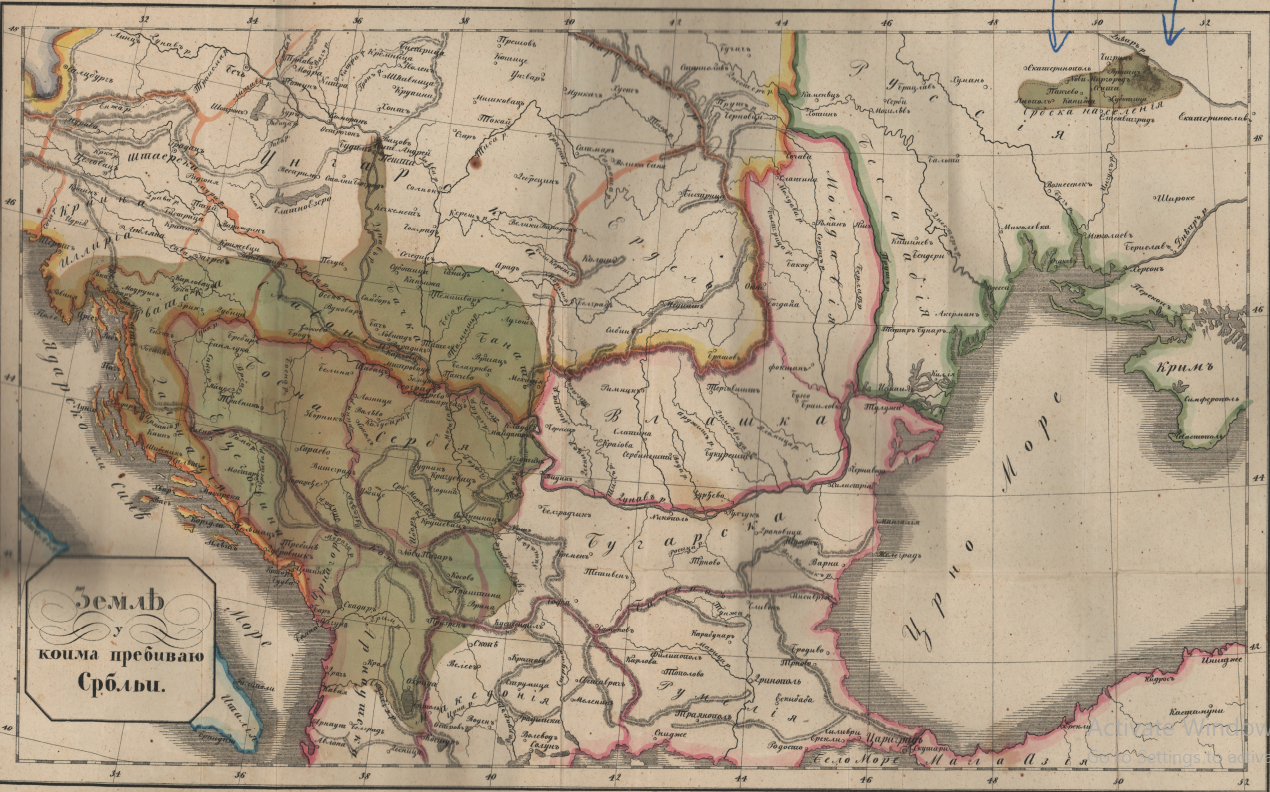
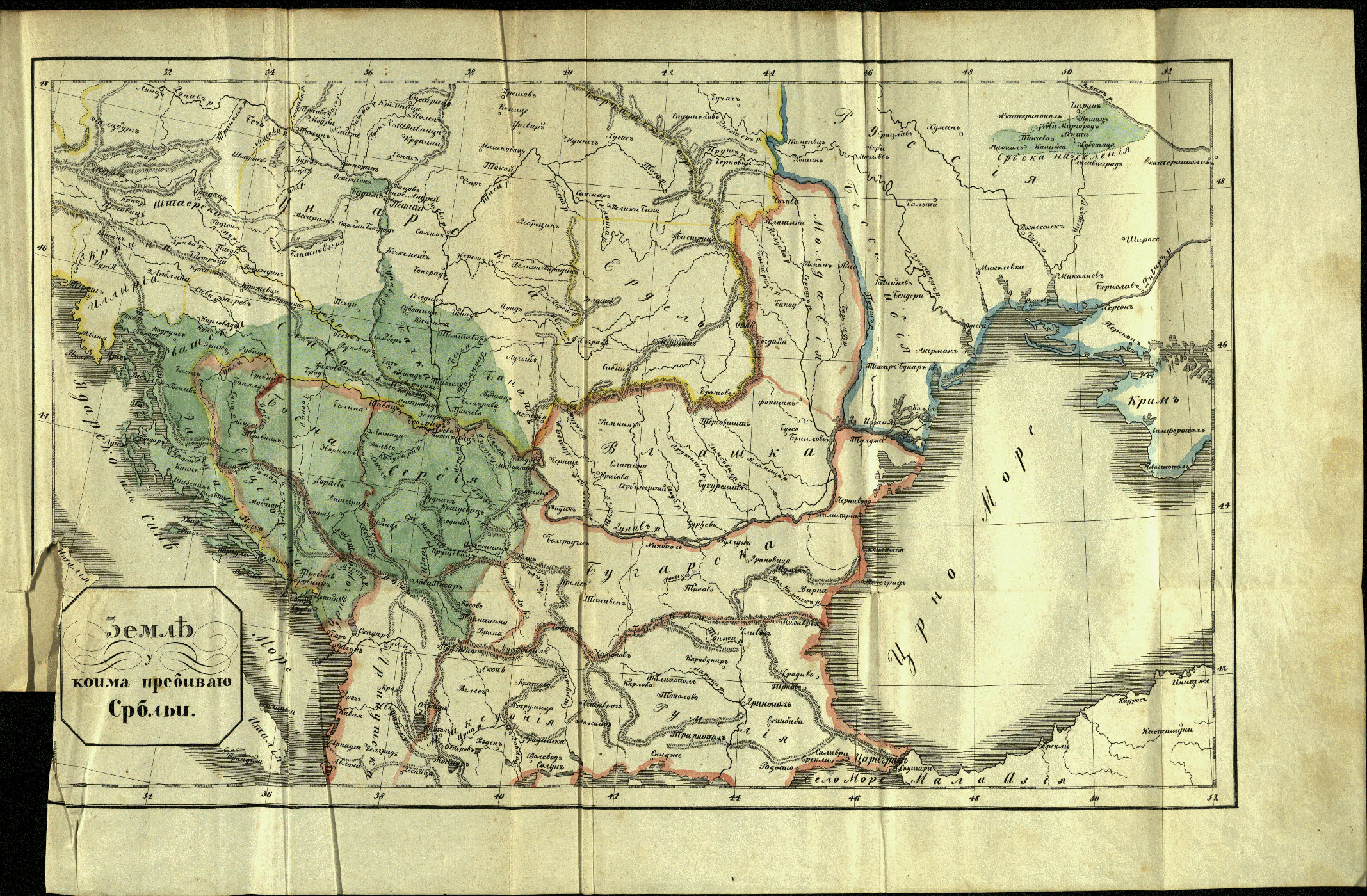
Maps called: „Territories inhabited by Serbs”. It forms a supplement to the book: „History of the Serbian people, edited by Dimitrije Davidović. Both maps originally appeared in Vienna (the first one was created in 1821, and the second in 1828) and show early 19th century Serbian thought on Serbs' ethnic boundaries.

The historical sources demonstrate that before the 19th century and the rise of nationalism in the Ottoman Empire the majority of the ordinary Orthodox Christians on the Balkans had only a vague idea of their ethnic identity. The local South Slavic-speaking peasants were accustomed to defining themselves in terms of their religion, locality, and occupation. After the national states were established, peasantry was indoctrinated through the schools and military conscription, the official Church, and the governmental press. It was through these instruments of the state administration, that a national identity came into real and rapid development.

Some Serbian sources from the mid 19th century claimed that the areas southeast of Niš, including Southern Pomoravlje and Macedonia, were mainly Bulgarian populated. Per Serbian newspaper, Vidovdan (No. 38, March 29, 1862), the future Bulgarian-Serbian frontier would extend from the Danube in North, along the Timok and South Morava, and then on the ridge of Shar Mountain towards the Black Drin River to the Lake of Ohrid in the South.

The region of today's Eastern Serbia faced a number of changes in regard to the dominant population group in the area, due to constant wars, conquests, plague Great Migrations of the Serbs, and Migrations of Bulgarians during the 17th and the 18th-19th century. It was only after the Serbian revolution and later independence that the Serbian national idea gained monumentum within the area east of Niš. According to many authors ca. 1850 the delineation between Serbs and Bulgarians ran north of Niš, although Cyprien Robert claimed that Serbs formed half of the town of Niš population. In the sub-district of Prokuplje, the most numerous ethnic group were the Albanians, while in Vranje, Bulgarians and Albanians were equally distributed alongside minority Serbian population. In Pirot and Leskovac sub-districts, the Bulgarians were the main ethnic group. The Turks lived mainly in the bigger towns, and were later expelled with other Muslim minorities in 1862. In Ottoman usage then the Sanjak of Niš was included in an area designated as "Bulgaristan", i.e. Bulgaria.

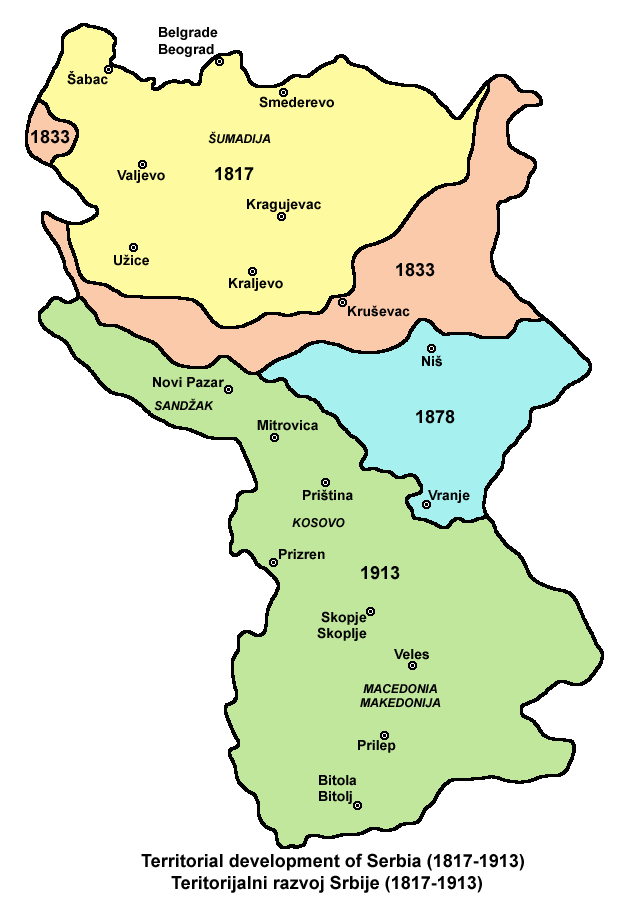
Territorial expansion of Serbia (1817–1913)

Serbian elites after the mid of the 19th century, claimed that the Bulgarians located south-east of Niš were Old Serbians, which was an implementation of Garašanin's irredentist plan called Načertanije. In 1870, the Southern Pomoravlje was included in the Bulgarian Exarchate. Milan Savić still claimed that at this time (1878) Niš and environs were Bulgarian populated. After the war between Russia and the Ottoman Empire (1877–1878), the lands in the regions of Niš, Pirot and Vranje became a part of Serbia. Serbia had successfully homogenized and modernized these new territories and in this way it assimilated the local Bulgarians of the Timok and Morava river valleys toward the end of the nineteenth century. Afterwards Serbia turned its attention to the region of Macedonia.

=== Kingdom of Serbia ===
In 1878 Serbia became independent and pressure developed in the state for people from different ethnic groups to Serbianise religious denominations and their personal names. Serbianisation of identity along with ideological and cultural Serbianisation followed. Belgrade was reconstructed as a new capital by the Serb elite that removed elements of the Ottoman era. While Serb commonfolk looked for ways to aid the Serb cause and assist other Serbs still residing in areas ruled by the Muslim Ottoman Empire. Austro-Hungarian Serbs who had integrated within Serbia and promoted Serbianisation opened the country up to cultural and economic influences of Austria-Hungary in the 1880s. The demographics of Niš underwent change whereby Serbs who formed half the urban population prior to 1878 became 80 percent in 1884.

=== Principality of Montenegro ===
According to jurist and sociologist Valtazar Bogišić all Eastern Orthodox citizens of Montenegro were Serbs. He states that they Serbianised a small number of Romani people who mostly worked as blacksmiths.

=== Ottoman Macedonia ===
Representatives from Serbia, such as the statesmen, diplomat and historian Stojan Novaković encouraged a separate Slavic Macedonian identity to counter the strong Bulgarian influence, to separate the local population from the rest of the Bulgarians, and to instill the "Serbian idea". Serbianising directly the local Slavic population through propaganda and education was difficult due to strong Bulgarian sentiments at the time in the region. The spread and promotion of Serbian Macedonianism was seen by Serbs as the first move toward eventually Serbianing the Macedonians. Serbian nationalist-oriented politicians in the 19th century traveled to the area of Ottoman Macedonia and spread national propaganda with intent to build a Serbian national feeling among the local population. One of these nationalist was Miloš Milojević who claimed that Serbia in ancient times has been far bigger, with expansion to more continents.

=== Vlachs ===
Pre-Ottoman Serbian Empire and its institutions had no time to serbicize the Balkan Vlachs in medieval Serbia, since it soon fell under the Turkish dominance; that process was not finished until the 19th century. Furthermore, the process of serbization, of "Vlachs" has been accomplished through the Serbian Orthodox Church in Dalmatia and the Military Frontiers (Vojna Krajina), i. e., in the territories of the Croatian Kingdom, together with Bosnia, where Vlachs found their final domicile. The Church had the most decisive role in the serbization process of Vlachs in the initial and middle phases. During the 16–18th centuries the amalgamation of the process of sedentarization of the Orthodox Vlachs and their gradual fusion into the Serbian rural population reached a high level and was recognized by the Ottoman authorities. In the final phase, the most significant role was played by the newspaper Srbobran in the 1880s and 1890s. According to Ivo Banac almost whole civil authority of the former Serbian state Ottomans transfer to the patriarchs of Peć. The millet system that the Serbs transferred to the Habsburg Monarchy was a good instrument for transmitting the Serbian national identity. Patriarchate of Peć and later Metropolitanate of Karlovci Serbianized parts of Balkan Orthodox people such as Bulgars, "Vlachs", Albanians, Romanians and a significant number of Catholic Croats. According to Vjeran Kursar although Catholic and Muslim Vlachs, or other, non-Serbian elements which exist in the western Balkans should not be underestimated still the vast majority of Vlachs in that area were Orthodox Christians and Serbian(ised), often still bilingual. All Slavic or Slavicised Orthodox Christians under the jurisdiction of Patriarchate of Peć ie Serbian patriarchs were eventually identified as Serbs, this process did not finish until modern times.

== 20th century ==
=== Interwar Yugoslavia ===
Following the First World War, the new Kingdom was reliant on patronage from the Serb monarchy that resulted in tendencies of centralisation and Serbianisation that other ethnic communities in the country opposed. In Belgrade a new government was formed after the war that quickly Serbianised the gendarmerie and made non-Serbs in the country view the new Kingdom as an extension of the old Kingdom of Serbia.

==== Vardar Macedonia ====
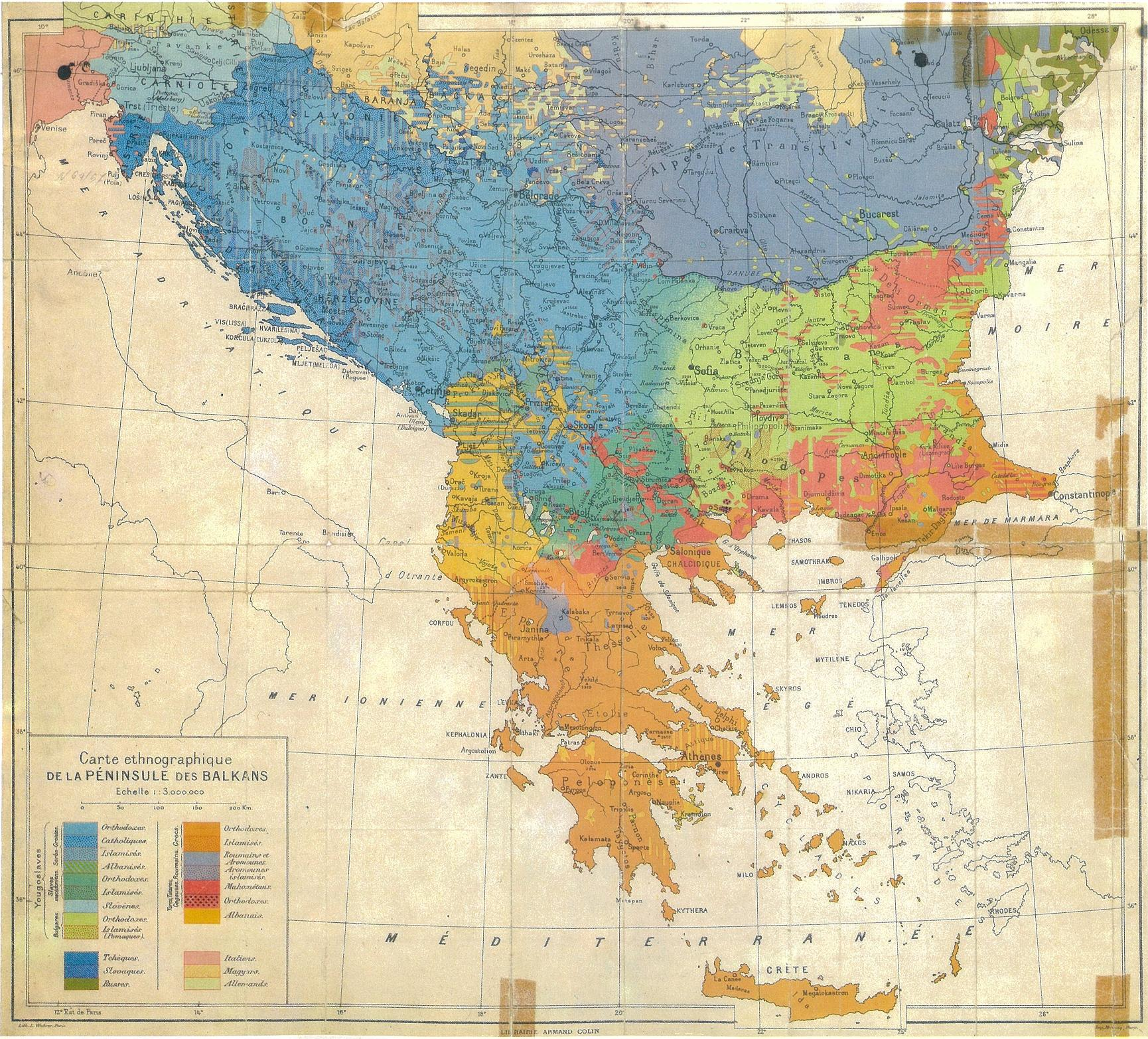
A World War I era ethnographic map of the Balkans by Serbian ethnologist Jovan Cvijić. The western parts of today Bulgaria and northwestern parts of present-day North Macedonia are shown as populated by Serbs. There are depicted also distinct "Slavic Macedonians". However, in this way he promoted the idea that Macedonian Slavs were in fact Southern Serbs.

The region of present-day North Macedonia until 1912 was part of the Ottoman Empire. According to Encyclopædia Britannica 1911 Edition, at the beginning of the 20th century the Slavs constituted the majority of the population in Macedonia. Per Britannica itself the bulk of the Slavs there were regarded as "Bulgarians". Although the majority of the Slavs did not have a clear sense of national identity, it was purely superficial and imposed by the nationalist propaganda campaigns. National identity was espoused by small number of educated people, often called intelligentsia, consisting of schoolteachers, priests, and government officials. Immediately after annexation of Vardar Macedonia to the Kingdom of Serbia, the Macedonian Slavs were faced with the policy of forced serbianisation.

We find here, as everywhere else, the ordinary measures of "Serbization" — the closing of schools, disarmament, invitations to schoolmasters to become Servian officials, nomination of "Serbomans", "Grecomans" and Vlachs [referring to Aromanians or Megleno-Romanians], as village headmen, orders to the clergy of obedience to the Servian Archbishop, acts of violence against influential individuals, prohibition of transit, multiplication of requisitions, forged signatures to declarations and patriotic telegrams, the organization of special bands, military executions in the villages and so forth.

— Report of the International Commission on the Balkan Wars.

Those who declared as ethnic Bulgarians were, harassed or deported to Bulgaria. The high clergymen of the Bulgarian Exarchate were also deported. Bulgarian schools were closed and teachers expelled. The population of Macedonia was forced to declare as Serbs. Those who refused were beaten and tortured. Prominent people and teachers from Skopje who refused to declare as Serbs were deported to Bulgaria. International Commission concluded that the Serbian state started in Macedonia wide sociological experiment of "assimilation through terror." All Bulgarian books gave way to Serbian. The government Serbianized personal names and surnames for all official uses. Between 1913 and 1915 all people who spoke a Slavic language in Vardar Macedonia were presented by Serbia as Serbs.

During the Kingdom of Serbs, Croats and Slovenes, the government of the Kingdom pursued a Serbisation policy towards population of the Macedonia, then called "Southern Serbia" (unofficially) or "Vardar Banovina" (officially). The dialects spoken in this region were referred to as dialects of Serbo-Croatian. Southern dialects were suppressed with regards to education, military and other national activities, and their usage was punishable. Following the First World War Serbian rule was reinstated over Vardar Macedonia, the local Bulgarian or Macedonian population was not recognised and an attempted Serbianisation occurred. Yugoslavia aimed to incorporate Macedonia through "assimilation" and "nationalisation" through two main goals. Firstly, to legitimate its control, the state based its claims to Macedonia as an inheritance of the medieval monarch Stefan Dušan or as a promised land given by God to the Serb people. Secondly, the state used the modernist idea of the nation and spread it through schools. Both processes merged as myths, people, symbols and dates originating from Serbian history were also used in the endeavour. During 1920 the Orthodox community of Vardar Macedonia was placed under the Serbian Orthodox Church after payment was made to the Constantinople Patriarchate who sold its control for 800,000 francs in 1919. In Vardar Macedonia, Bulgarian signage and literature was removed and societies were shut down along with the expulsion of Bulgarian teachers and clergy who had returned during the war. Names of people were forcefully Serbianised such as Atanasov becoming Atanasović and Stankov as Stanković along with a spate of repression that followed through arrests, internment and detention.

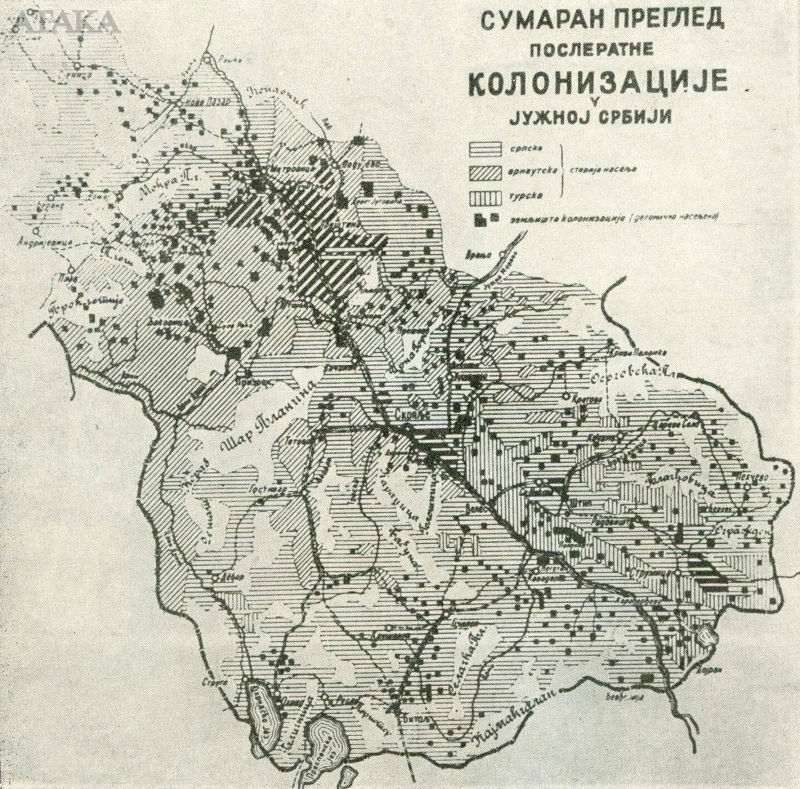
Serbian colonisation in Kosovo and Vardar Macedonia between 1920 and 1930. Colonised areas are in thick hatched black lines and colonised settlements are shown as black squares

The Kingdom was also interested to change the ethnic composition of the population in Vardar Macedonia. Yugoslavia commenced a policy of forced Serbianisation through such measures as the Agrarian Reform which was a settlement plan. In 1919 there were announced the orders for preparing for colonization of Southern Serbia. The Serbian colonization was maintained through "agricultural" and "administrative" actions. In the Interbellum, the Kingdom has settled 3,670 families (18,384 persons). The colonists were given properties. Also, in the same time, almost all clerks in the area were Serbs. This means that in the period between the two World wars the Kingdom succeeded through the agricultural and the administrative colonizations to create significant Serbian ethnic minority in Vardar Macedonia. Total numbers were 4,200 Serb families with 50,000 Serb gendarmes and troops relocated from Serbia to Vardar Macedonia to advance the Serbianisation of the region and population.

Politicians based in Belgrade thought that ideology alongside repression could generate the "correct national" sentiments among local inhabitants. Serb officials, gendarmes and teachers, often poorly trained and little interested in their job according to reports of the time were given the task to "nationalise and assimilate" the region. The initiation of an educational campaign made children to learn that "I am a true Serb like my father and my mother" while their parents were not receptive of the Yugoslav state. A small number of inhabitants did declare themselves as South Serbs and Serbs, often done for reasons of opportunism. Government authorities due to maladministration had difficulties in Serbianising the local population as they were strongly attached to the Bulgarian Orthodox Church (Exarchate) and Bulgarian nationalism. The same authorities held conflicting views toward the population, whom they told were Serbian, whereas local inhabitants noticed they were treated unequally in relation to their Serb counterparts. Some state officials let locals know that they viewed them as Bulgarians and used the term bugaraši for people that supported Bulgarians or were not recognised as Serbs. The state considered individuals that supported local autonomy, culture or language as a Bulgaroman and sought their suppression. In Vardar Macedonia Bulgarian newspapers were banned in many areas and mail from Bulgaria remained undelivered within the region due to "a technicality".

As a counteraction to Serb efforts the paramilitary IMRO began sending armed bands into Yugoslav Macedonia to assassinate officials and stir up the spirit of the locals. After 1923 the IMRO had de facto full control of Bulgarian Macedonia and acted as a "state within a state". It used Bulgaria as a base for terrorist attacks against Yugoslavia with the unofficial agreement of the right-wing governments. Because of this, contemporary observers described the Yugoslav-Bulgarian border as the most fortified in Europe. Meanwhile, several hundred political assassinations were organized by the Yugoslav security police led by Dobrica Matković. Following regular attacks by pro-Bulgarian IMRO komitadjis on Serbian colonists and gendarmes, the government appealed to Association against Bulgarian Bandits, responsible for the massacre of 53 inhabitants of the village of Garvan in 1923. Regions with pro-Bulgarian sentiments such as Tikveš and Bregalnica were violently Serbianised by Serb četniks that resulted in the population being gathered up for forced labour and local leaders killed.

In the 1930s a more homogeneous generation was growing up in Vardar Macedonia, which resisted Serbianisation and increasingly identified itself as Macedonian, but which also made it clear that the Bulgarian idea was no more the only option for them. A sizable part of the local population nonetheless had undergone a transformation as Serbianised Slavs. The government and its widespread massive Serbianisation campaign was unsuccessful in trying to eliminate the traces of an emerging Macedonian national consciousness among the local population. The failed assimilation of the region was due to Serb policies that were exploitative and colonial and not directed toward integration. Funds were controlled from Belgrade and the economy was geared toward resource extraction whose raw materials were bought by the government at low prices it determined for itself. The state controlled the local tobacco monopoly and acquired a steady and sizable amount of revenue without investing much in return to raise the living standards of the inhabitants. The government in Belgrade or the wider administration showed little concern toward conditions within the region. A high rate of turnover existed among ministers and officials who mainly showed up prior to elections or to advance their own career and often staff in the local administration from other parts of the country were incompetent and corrupt.

Locals were excluded from involvement in the sociopolitical system, suppression of elites occurred and state security forces instilled an environment of fear among inhabitants. New arrivals to the region were favoured over the local population regarding state employment, loans and agricultural reform and both groups continued to be separate from each other. During the interwar period the Croatian question dominated politics, Macedonia was sidelined and the view of the time was that discontent within the region could be contained through use of repressive measures. Local inhabitants were mistrusted by the political elite of Belgrade whom designated them as being pure Serbs or through terms such as the "classical south". During the interwar period Bulgaria resented the Serbianisation policy in Vardar Macedonia. In World War II, the Bulgarian Army occupied southern Yugoslavia and their troops were welcomed as liberators from Serbianisation by the local Macedonian Slavs.

==== Kosovo ====
The attempt at the Serbianisation of Kosovo and Albanian reaction toward resisting those efforts has been a factor contributing to conflict among Albanians and the Serbs. The region was strategically important for the state and its security with the local Albanian population deemed as "unreliable". Kosovo from the early twentieth century was exposed to the politics of Serbianisation through violence and administrative measures such as replacing Albanians with another population. In the aftermath of the First World War Serbian control over Kosovo was restored and the Kingdom attempting to counteract Albanian separatism pursued a policy to alter the national and religious demographics of Kosovo and to Serbianise the area. The government implemented policies such as the Agrarian Reform. It was a settlement plan to encourage Serb and Montenegrin settlers from other parts of Yugoslavia to resettle in Kosovo through preferential treatment of financial and land incentives to strengthen the Slavic element. The process involved the construction of new settlements in Kosovo and due to serbianisation efforts some were named Lazarevo, Obilić, Miloševo after heroes from Serbian epic poetry. Other places such as Ferizović (Alb: Ferizaj) had their name changed to Uroševac.

Albanian land was illegally confiscated and often through expropriations, whereas Serb settlers gained possession of prime land. The Albanian population was encouraged to leave the region, as they were perceived to be immigrants in need of repatriation to either Turkey, Albania or expected to assimilate within Yugoslavia. The state closed Albanian schools in 1918 as part of its efforts toward Serbianising the local Albanian population. Between 1918 and 1923, as a result of state policies 30,000 and 40,000 mainly Muslim Albanians migrated to the Turkish regions of İzmir and Anatolia. Albanian historians state that during the whole interwar period 300,000 Albanians left Yugoslavia due to duress. By 1931 the Serbianisation efforts had failed as Albanians still composed 63% of the Kosovan population. Other parts of the Serbianisation policy in Kosovo included establishing an effective government administration and refusing autonomous Albanian cultural development in the region.

=== Communist Yugoslavia ===
==== SR Macedonia ====
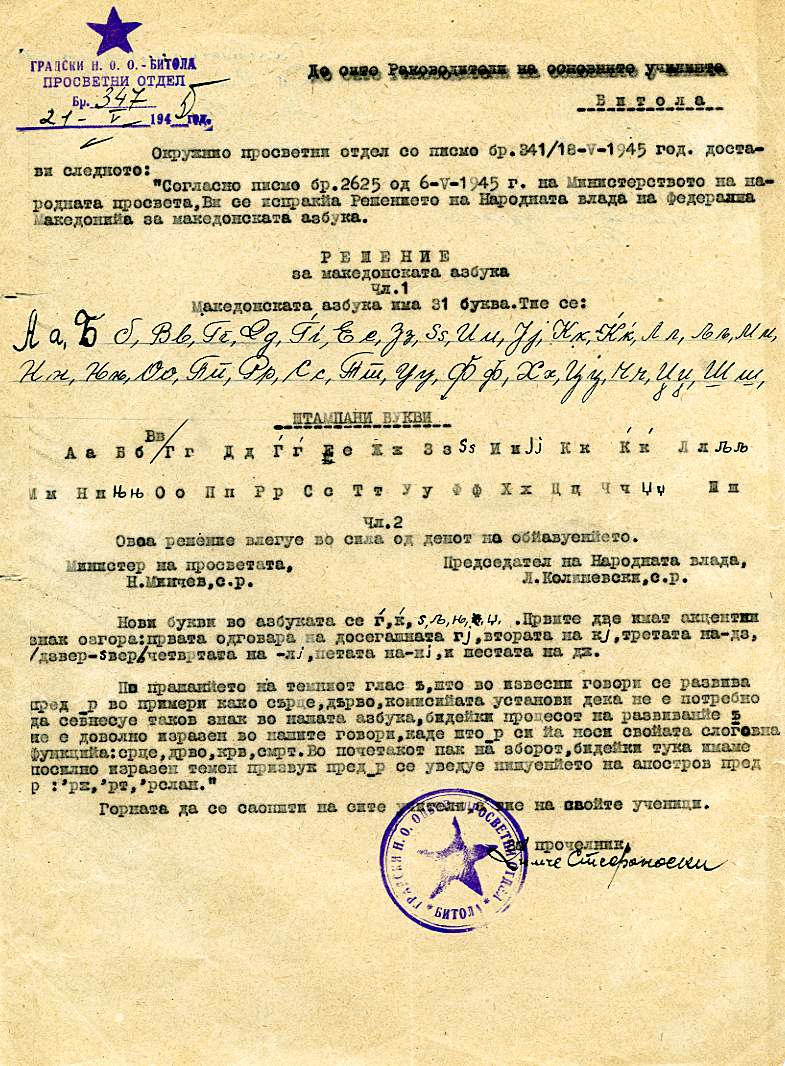
Decision about the Macedonian Alphabet 1 May 1945. Note it is written on Bulgarian typewriter using Й and there are hand-written Ѕ, Ј and Џ, and diacritics added to create Ѓ and Ќ. The rejection of the Ъ, together with the adoption of Ј, Џ, Љ and Њ, led some authors to consider it to be "Serbianization".

After WWII Marshal Tito formed out SR Macedonia of a part of 1929–1941 Vardar Banovina, and encouraged the development of Macedonian identity and Macedonian as a separate South Slavic language. Some researchers have described the process of codifying the Macedonian language during 1945–1950 as 'Serbianization'. Within the period of Macedonian language codification, two tendencies emerged: one language majority, that was pro-Macedonian, with some pro-Bulgarian biases, and one language minority openly pro-Serbian. The language minority, with the help of the Yugoslav political establishment defeated the language majority. Macedonian became a “first” official language in the newly proclaimed SR Macedonia, where Serbian was declared as “second” language, while Bulgarian was prohibited. The irreversible turning point of Serbianisation of the Macedonian standard took place in the late 1950s. On the other hand, during the time of federation in Socialist Yugoslavia, Yugoslav citizens learned Serbo-Croatian at school. This bilingualism was stimulated by the subordinated pro-Serbian elites in Yugoslav Macedonia. In this way the influence of Serbo-Croatian arose to such a level, that the colloquial speech of the capital Skopje has been described as a "creolized form of Serbian". For Bulgarians, Macedonian nationalism represents the result of the Serbification process in the region. Bulgarian scholars and politicians maintain that the Macedonian language was Serbified as it adopted words from the Serbian language in the postwar codification process under Yugoslavia that the Bulgarian government has denounced. At that time the Yugoslav Communists recognized also the existence of a separate Macedonian nation to quiet the fears of the Slavic population that a new Yugoslavia would continue to follow the pre-war policies of serbianization. According to the British academician, James Pettifer, the pro-Belgrade elite that was built up in Skopje, consisted of hardline communists who were really Serbs, but masked as Macedonians. They justified their hegemony through a manufacturing a local history which was closer to a mythology.

==== "Western Outlands" ====
Modern-day Serbian municipalities, Bosilegrad and Dimitrovgrad, which are called Western Outlands by Bulgarians, were ceded by Bulgaria to the Kingdom of Yugoslavia in 1920 as a result of the Treaty of Neuilly, after Bulgaria had been one of the Central Powers defeated in World War I. All Bulgarian schools and churches there were closed. Serbian primary schools were opened, teaching and learning in Serbian, while Bulgarian was prohibited. In 1920 a Law on the Protection of the State was adopted, which forced the Bulgarians there to accept Serbian names and surnames. A large part of the population emigrated to Bulgaria. An armed conflict started in 1922 when pro-Bulgarian separatist IWORO carried out numerous assaults on the Tzaribrod–Belgrade railway. Bulgarians have received the status of a national minority after WWII. They live in the Dimitrovgrad (previously named Caribrod) and Bosilegrad municipalities and in several villages in Pirot, Babušnica and Surdulica municipalities. However, in 1948 there was a sharp deterioration for several decades of the Bulgarian-Yugoslav relations, due to the Tito–Stalin split. The Bulgarian teachers there were expelled again. The population was subjected to humiliation and systematic psychological terror. Bulgarians made the highest percentage among the minorities detained on Goli Otok labour camp after the WWII. The decades of geographic isolation of other Bulgarians, and the repressions additionally led this community to inability to build its own minority space for many years.

=== Yugoslav wars ===
During the 1980s, some Serb intellectuals criticised the League of Communists and held them responsible for Yugoslavia's political and economic troubles while offering solutions to the "Serbian question" through discussions and explanations of the Serb predicament. One of the narratives that emerged claimed that under communism Serbs had abandoned their old traditions resulting in a loss of Serbian identity and unawareness of Serb interests with looming historical defeat in a process called "de-Serbisation".

==== Yugoslav army ====
The Yugoslav army (JNA) prior to the 1990s was a multi-ethnic force consisting of conscripts, regulars, commissioned and non-commissioned officers that for the highest ranks was determined through an ethnic principle of representative proportionality reflected in Yugoslavia's multi-ethnic composition. Serbs overall held most senior, middle and junior ranks. Following 1990-1991 during the later stages of the breakup of Yugoslav federation that descended into war the JNA underwent a process of Serbianisation. It transformed from being multi-ethnic into a mainly Serb organisation under the Serbian republic's President Slobodan Milošević who held control and command over the force. During the period non-Serb personnel defected to the new armies of the new post-Yugoslav republics and others who felt disillusioned yet were unable to defect resigned. Slovene, Croat, Macedonian and Muslim (Bosniak) officers left the ranks of the Yugoslav army. As the army became dominated more by Serbs a program has instituted to retire non-Serb personnel that resulted in 24 generals remaining out of 150 on the eve of when the JNA was formally disbanded on 19 May 1992. In that time 42 of those generals had been removed by General Božidar Stevanović during his campaign of Serbianisation. He belonged to a clandestine network called Vojna Linija (Military Line) that backed the Serbianisation of the JNA and Milošević placed Stevanović as head of the air force to accelerate the removal of military personnel deemed unreliable and non-Serb. Following these processes the JNA was impacted due to the realisation that Yugoslavia no longer existed and its priority shifted toward creating the frontiers of a new Serbian state. A campaign to shift the political orientation of the JNA to a Serbian character also occurred.

At the end of May 1992, over 90% of the JNA was composed of Serbs. The Serbianisation of the Yugoslav army created the conditions for their support of Serbs in the Krajina region of Croatia and Bosnia. Following the independence of Bosnia and formation of a new Yugoslav federation of Serbia and Montenegro, the old Yugoslav army was divided into two new armed forces due to UN sanctions imposed on the federation. Several months prior to May 1992 a division of armies and its assets was planned as authorities in Belgrade assessed its involvement in Bosnia would receive a hostile international reaction along with being accused of aggression. JNA General Veljko Kadijević was appointed to carry out the task by redeploying all Serbs from Bosnia to local Bosnian army units and removing any Serbs not from the area. As such Belgrade later claimed to be uninvolved in the Bosnian War while Bosnian Serb military forces remained under its control. Seen as reliable by Belgrade, Ratko Mladić was promoted to general and given command over the Serbian armed forces in Bosnia while maintaining the fiction of a separate armed force as the old Yugoslav chain of command remained. Mladić and Serb Bosnian forces under his command followed Belgrade's Serbian nationalist aims and objectives. Serb military forces in Croatia were also under the control of Belgrade.

On 25–26 August 1993 at a gathering the Supreme Defense Council of retired generals, Milošević's full control over the Yugoslav army was complete as the few remaining traces of the JNA were done away with. It was succeeded by the Army of Yugoslavia (Vojska Jugoslavije -VJ). Serbianisation continued during the first few years of the new military force through purges of personnel arising out of a need to ensure the loyalty of the armed forces to Milošević. During the Yugoslav Wars, the Serbianised Yugoslav National Army was involved in the destruction of urban centres such as Sarajevo, Mostar and Vukovar. Territories within Bosnia conquered during the war by Bosnian Serbs were subjected to homogenisation and assimilation through Serbianisation. The processes of Serbianisation of the Yugoslav army resulted in the creation of three Serbian armies under the control of Milošević. Following the conclusion of the Yugoslav Wars of the early 1990s, the Serbianisation process of the Yugoslav army (JNA) was confirmed at the International Criminal Tribunal for the former Yugoslavia (ICTY) by witnesses.

==== Kosovo ====
In the late 1980s Milošević promoted a Serbian nationalist platform that entailed the re-Serbianisation of two autonomous Yugoslav provinces, Kosovo and Vojvodina. On 23 March 1989, the autonomy of Kosovo within the Yugoslav federation was revoked by the government of the Serb Republic and Serbianisation of the province followed. During the 1990s under the government of Milošević the Serbianisation of Kosovo occurred. Laws were passed by the parliament of Serbia that sought to change the power balance in Kosovo relating to the economy, demography and politics. Various measures included prohibiting the official use of Albanian, prevention of Albanian involvement in education, severely limiting the usage of Albanian symbols and efforts to deal with the imbalances of demography between Albanians and Serbs. In the education sector Serbian authorities pressed Albanian schools to follow the Serbian language curriculum and to achieve those aims Albanian teachers in the thousands were replaced with Serbs. The government imputed the mass dismissal of Albanian teachers to incompetence in the Serbian language, and that Kosovo educational institutions were centres for resistance and counterrevolution that indoctrinated Albanian students.

Other reforms of the Kosovo education system segregated Albanian and Serb students within schools while funding, teaching staff and educational facilities were allocated for Serbian students and Albanian students received little. An entrance exam in Serbian literature and language became compulsory for students to pass in secondary schools. The Kosovo police force underwent Serbianisation after accusations of maltreatment toward non-Albanian civilians (mainly Serbs and Montenegrins) were made against ethnic Albanian police that resulted in their dismissal. The Kosovo Albanian police force was replaced with Serb special police units of the Serbian Interior Ministry. Albanians were against the measures and as such riot police and troops prevented them through force from going to school with some educational facilities being surrounded by tanks to stop attendance by students. The Kosovo police force that was newly Serbianised maltreated the Albanian population.

At the University of Pristina similar reforms occurred and lecturers that were not dismissed were required to use Serbian as the medium of instruction, with the level of Albanians at the university declining toward the conclusion of 1991. Pristina University along with its students became an important centre of Albanian resistance to Serbianisation. The parliament of Kosovo repudiated Serbianisation and made a declaration of the province's independence, established an alternative government and ministry of education. Demonstrations by Albanians were followed by more dismissals and reprisals in the education sector which led to the establishment of an Albanian parallel education system consisting of previously dismissed teachers giving lessons in private homes. Kosovan Albanian school textbooks of the interwar period of the 1990s referred to the Serbianisation of Kosovo through attempted colonisation and mass expulsion of Albanians by Serbs for a prolonged period of Kosovo's history in the twentieth century. Hospitals had their Albanian nurses and physicians dismissed.

Another aspect of Serbianisation in Kosovo was the implementation of a discriminatory language policy. In 1991 public discourse was Serbianised through a campaign by the government such as targeting signs and government organs that became unfamiliar to many monolingual Albanians. Kosovo media was Serbianised as 1,300 employees of Radio & TV Pristina were dismissed with television coming under Belgrade control and a propaganda tool for the government. Albanian language newspapers were shut down and the most popular newspapers placed under the control of the government while other independent papers allowed to exist were under constant pressure from the state. Cultural institutions of Kosovo only showed Serbian productions. Albanian municipal officials and industrial workers were also dismissed from their employment. State sanctioned Serbianisation overall resulted in more than 100,000 Kosovo Albanians losing employment with many made to leave their apartments while their jobs were given to Serbs that migrated into the region.

At the time, for Serb nationalists the process of Serbianisation entailed the resettlement of Serbs to Kosovo and limiting the favorable demographic position Albanians held. Originating from the 1930s, the works of Vaso Čubrilović, a Serb nationalist writer became popular in Serbia during the 1990s and their content called for the dislocation of Albanians through mass resettlement. In 1995, a Serb Radical politician Vojislav Šešelj wrote in the publication Velika Srbija (Greater Serbia) a memorandum that outlined the Serbianisation of Kosovo. Šešelj called for violence and expulsion against Albanians and their leadership with aims toward discrediting them within Western public opinion. Following similar themes the parliament of Serbia on 11 January 1995 passed the Decree for Colonisation of Kosovo of the Federal Republic of Yugoslavia. It outlined government benefits for Serbs who desired to live in Kosovo with loans to build homes or purchase other dwellings and offered free plots of land. Few Serbs took up the offer due to the worsening situation in Kosovo at the time.

The government in 1995 resorted to forcefully resettling in Kosovo Serb refugees from Croatia, with most leaving thereafter and few remaining that increased tensions in the area. Serbs selling property to Albanians was made illegal by the government. Fines existed for ethnic Albanians that did not undertake military service in Bosnia and Croatia. The government also made if difficult for Albanians living overseas to return, and penalties existed for ethnic Albanian families that had more than one child while Kosovo Serbs were rewarded for having multiple children. Serbianisation of the Kosovo economy also occurred with areas inhabited by Serbs receiving investment, new infrastructure and employment opportunities, while Albanians overall were either excluded or had limited economic participation. The Kosovo war began in 1998. In January 1999, the government authorities initiated a planned offensive against Kosovo Albanians that involved the violent liquidation of assets aimed at their displacement and Serbianisation of the region.

==== Serbian language ====
Following the breakup of Yugoslavia, the official language Serbo-Croatian broke up into separate official languages and the process in relation to Serbian involved the Serbianisation of its lexicon.

=== Other ethnic groups ===
Voluntary Serbianisation has sometimes been attributed to Romanians in Serbia since the 19th century. The Hungarian minority in north Serbia (Vojvodina) has also been affected by Serbianisation since the aftermath of World War II.

== 21st century ==
=== Accusations of Serbianisation in North Macedonia ===
The historical event that created the Yugoslav Macedonian republic on 2 August 1944 was viewed differently through political party rivalries. The Social Democratic Union of Macedonia (SDSM) celebrate it while during 1990s the VMRO-DPMNE had condemned it as part of a Serbification project. In 2015, Ljubčo Georgievski, who is founder of the VMRO-DPMNE and former prime minister of the country, accused VMRO-DPMNE of serbianising the country and said that there was a process of Serbianisation of the Macedonian people. However, a Macedonian political analyst disputed this argument and argued that Macedonian politics led towards bulgarianisation then instead for favouring Bulgarian historical figures. According to the university professor Dimitar Mirchev in the relations between Belgrade and Skopje, there is an imbalance in the presence of Serbian culture in North Macedonia, but it would be an exaggeration to describe it as a Serbianisation. Subsequently, Ljubčo Georgievski harshly criticised the new VMRO-DPMNE government, claiming it turned sharply towards the "Serbian world". In July 2025 the European Parliament adopted a resolution on the report on North Macedonia's progress towards EU accession where concern was expressed about the role of the "Serbian world" project in the country. It is claimed there that some representatives of the Hristijan Mickoski's government have promoted this concept, that seeks to establish a Serbian sphere of influence in the Balkan region. Per Ali Ahmeti, the leader of the Democratic Union for Integration, the ruling VMRO-DPMNE government fostered a growing influence of the "Serbian World" at the expense of the country’s sovereignty and its aspirations for European integration, while employing strong anti-Albanian and anti-Bulgarian rhetoric. In 2026, Bulgarian historian Konstantin Golev stated that some kind of Stockholm syndrome has been observed in North Macedonia towards Serbia.

== See also ==
- Serbomans
- Serbophobia
- Albanisation
- Bosniakisation
- Bulgarisation
- Croatisation
- Germanisation
- Macedonianisation
- Magyarization
- Montenegrinisation
- Romanianization
- Yugoslav colonization of Kosovo
