= All-National TV =

Belarusian state-owned television station

Obshchenatsional'noe Televidenie (ONT) Общенациональное Телевидение (ОНТ)
- Logo used since 2017.
- Country: Belarus
- Broadcast area: Nationwide
- Affiliates: Channel One Russia
- Headquarters: Minsk, Belarus

Programming
- Languages: Russian, Belarusian
- Picture format: 1080i (16:9 HDTV)

Ownership
- Owner: Ministry of Information of Belarus (1%), Belarusbank (5%), Fabrika Informatsionyh Texnologiy Ltd. (94%)
- Key people: Igor Lutski

History
- Launched: June 25, 2002; 24 years ago
- Replaced: ORT (Channel One Russia) (Note: A number of ORT relays continued rebroadcasting only ORT programming modified by BTRC for some time after ONT's launch.)

Links
- Website: www.ont.by

Availability

Terrestrial
- DVB-T: MUX 1 (2)

All-National Television (Russian: Общенациональное телевидение, Obshchenatsional'noe Televidenie, ONT; Belarusian: Агульнанацыянальнае тэлебачанне, Ahuľnanacyjanaľnaje teliebačannie, ANT) is Belarus's second state-owned television station. Established on 15 February 2002 by decree of the President of Belarus, the station replaced relays of Channel One and currently broadcasts most of that channel's content.

== History ==
Since the late 1990s, BTRC had been interfering with the re-broadcasts of Russian channels in Belarus: ORT, RTR, and, from 2000, NTV, as these channels could not pay for their retransmission fees. This led to the replacement of Russian commercials with local ones, a cut in airtime (because the Belarusian channels started later and ended earlier than a typical Russian channel), and the removal of certain content due to rights issues. The Belarusian president announced that a second national channel would be created. Instead of being operated by BTRC, it was intended to replace the frequencies used by the ORT relays.

ONT was established by a decree of President Alexander Lukashenko on February 15, 2002. The channel used the frequencies formerly used by relayers of Channel One. The channel was intended to be the second national channel from the outset; instead of being a second BTRC channel, it was a separate operation.

The Minsk Executive Committee officially registered ONT on March 19, 2002.

Broadcasts commenced on June 25, 2002 at 16:30, with ORT's comedy show Smekhopanorama. The station's slogan was Ne vmesto, a vmeste (Not instead of, but together). The first national production seen on the new channel, at 20:35, was the inaugural edition of Nashi Novosti (Our News), ONT's main news programme, which for years aired after Vremya from ORT. The first edition was hosted by Alexander Averkov, who is still its presenter.

Initially, ONT relayed ORT's programming most of the time, with significant differences in advertising breaks and news operation, as well as including programming from a few other federal Russian channels (NTV, TNT, RTR). As the years progressed, the channel added more original content. The channel had a fundamental difference from ORT: it had a greater flexibility in the airing of relayed Russian programs to air at more convenient times for Belarusian viewers. On November 10, 2002, it premiered Kontury (Contours), an analysis programme still presented by Igor Lutsky. The network released its national anthem video to air at the start of the new year, and that was repeated several times in the channel's early years on air.

Nashe Utro (Our Morning) first went on the air on February 3, 2004.

Between June 25, 2007, and November 2008, ONT attempted 24-hour broadcasting, using the overnight hours to broadcast films and a short edition of Nashi Novosti at 3 am.

In the summer of 2008, ONT exclusively broadcast in Belarus all the games of the UEFA Euro 2008 European football championship live. In October 2008, according to a study from a private research group, the channel had the highest viewer ratings.

In 2009, by a decision of President Lukashenko, ONT was expected to be given the rights to select the Belarus entry for the Eurovision Song Contest 2010, after seeing Belarus fail to qualify for the previous year's final and divisions within the BTRC's team. On July 31, 2009, ONT got the rights to host the 2010 national selection. The information for the Belarus Song Contest, which ONT planned to hold, was removed from the channel's website in September, as it was not an EBU member. Membership to the EBU was only considered from December, which was after the application deadline; this was subsequently rejected.

On October 9, 2013, ONT launched a second channel, ONT.BY, which would broadcast ONT's original productions exclusively to the internet.

On March 21, 2016, ONT became one of the first major Belarusian channels to switch to a widescreen format. Igor Lutsky resigned in 2017; on December 18, a new look and logo were introduced, along with a revamped news studio. The channel began broadcasting in high definition on November 1, 2018. Beginning in 2020, the channel started reducing the number of Channel One relays on its schedule.

Its primary YouTube channel, along with that of the Belarusian Telegraph Agency and STV were terminated, ostensibly without an announcement by platform owner Google on April 3, 2026.

== Programming ==
ONT broadcasts some of Channel One's shows, such as Vremya, Vecherniye Novosti, Pole Chudes and Pust' Govoryat, among others, as well as having a significant amount of local productions such as the nightly news bulletin Nashi Novosti (Our News), which airs directly, as of 2026, after Vremya (Wednesdays and Thursdays) or Vecherniye Novosti (Mondays, Tuesdays and Fridays), morning talk-show Nashe Utro (Our Morning), a local version of Chto? Gde? Kogda?, among others.

When Channel One shows are broadcast, ONT's on-screen bug is displayed to the right of Channel One's.

== Criticism ==
ONT adheres to pro-government political views. In news programs and documentary projects, the policies pursued by President Alexander Lukashenko are strongly endorsed. Broadcast interviews with opposition figures were kept to a minimum, and after the 2020 presidential elections, they ceased altogether. In addition, during this period, propaganda sections appeared on the channel (for example, "It Will Be Supplemented", "Anti-Fake") in which the opposition was discredited, and the current interview program Markov. Nothing Personal is now dedicated exclusively to people who publicly approve of the activities of the Belarusian authorities.

=== Closing of the talk show Choice during the 2010 presidential elections ===
On December 19, 2010, ONT aired a special edition of the talk show Choice hosted by Sergei Dorofeev (who is also the head of the channel's morning broadcasting directorate). During the broadcast, Dorofeev, who at that time held opposition political views, began asking "uncomfortable" questions to the officials who were in the studio, including the head of the Central Election Commission of Belarus Lidia Ermoshina, focusing, in particular, on violations at polling stations, the exclusion of opposition representatives, an official ban on mass protests, and forcing citizens to participate in early voting.

After many such questions asked by Dorofeev, Ermoshina defiantly left the program's studio, saying that she "doesn't have time to be liberal while people are blocked in the Central Election Commission". After this broadcast, the program went on hiatus, from which it did not return. From January 31, 2011, the channel began airing a new talk show, Open Format, which took the place of Choice (the topic of the first episode of the new program was the past presidential elections, its guest was also Ermoshina, and the episode itself didn't ask the "uncomfortable" questions).

In April 2011, Sergei Dorofeev was fired from ONT.

=== Coverage of the 2020 presidential election and subsequent protests ===
On June 12, 2020, during the presidential election campaign, ONT broadcast a video in which affirmative statements were made regarding the guilt of the presidential candidate Viktor Babariko, and those detained in the Belgazprombank case:

"I can't even imagine that such activities could be carried out without the knowledge of the manager. And I can already say that we have evidence of his participation in this illegal activity."

According to the head of the Belarusian non-profit human rights organization "Legal Initiative", Victoria Fedorova, these statements are unacceptable and grossly violate human rights, as well as the principle of the presumption of innocence, enshrined in Article 26 of the Constitution and in Article 16 of the Criminal Procedure Code of Belarus.

In June 2020, without explanation, the author's program The Adventures of Captain Wrangel, with one of the most famous Belarusian TV presenters, Dmitry Wrangel, who had previously condemned the brutality of Belarusian riot police detaining buyers at the souvenir shop SYMBAL.BY in Minsk, was taken off the air. At the same time, the contract with Dmitry Wrangel was to run until the end of 2020. According to the presenter, it was his civic position that caused the program to be taken off the air.

In July 2020, the sports section of the Our Morning program on ONT, which was hosted on Mondays by the famous Belarusian gymnast Melitina Staniuta, was taken off the air. This also happened after Stanyuta's reaction to the brutal detentions of people in line at the SYMBAL.BY store, which occurred on June 23.

Also in July 2020, the popular TV presenter of the show Luck In The Bargain, Dmitry Kokhno, was taken off the air; he also had criticized the actions of riot police who harshly detained civilians standing in line at the store of SYMBAL.BY. The leader's post against the actions of the Belarusian riot police was even quoted by the American publication The New York Times.

=== Spread of misinformation ===
ONT has more than once been accused of distributing misinformation, which is analyzed by the Evil News program on Poland's Belsat: "Polish television showed a map of the division of Ukraine." "Italy itself takes more than a quarter of the grain supplied to Europe. All these famous pizzas and pasta – where do they actually come from? From Russian wheat." "In the European Union, due to quarrels with Russia, fuel prices have risen sharply. Except for those member countries that are friends with Moscow, contrary to the official position of the bloc. For such European friends of Russia, fuel prices, on the contrary, are falling." and others.
