= Soft Belarusization =

Domestic policy of Alexander Lukashenko

Soft Belarusization or soft Belarusification (Belarusian: мяккая беларусізацыя, romanized: miakkaja biełarusizacyja, Russian: мягкая белорусизация, romanized: myagkaya belorusizatsiya) is an element of the domestic policy of President of Belarus Alexander Lukashenko aimed at the gradual increase of the presence of Belarusian language and partial reversal of the ages of Russification of Belarus.

== History ==
Elements of the renewed Belarusization were seen when the Soviet Union started to collapse in late 1980s, known as the Second Belarusization. It was effectively ended by Lukashenko after the controversial 1995 Belarusian referendum, which included the question "Do you agree with assigning the Russian language the status equal to that of the Belarusian language?" (86.8% approval rate among the participants; 53,9% of the total number of eligible voters, with the turnout of 64.8%). After that the Russification of Belarus accelerated. The 1998 law "О языках в Республике Беларусь" officially removed the preferred support of the Belarusian language.

During 2009-2010 Lukashenko tried to improve his relations with the West and made some concessions towards the Belarusian language. In particular, the 2010 law "О наименовании географических объектов" ("On the Naming of Geographical Objects") gave priority to the Belarusian language in this respect. This sometimes produced unusual names. For example, one minor lane in Minsk was named "праезд Ратавальнікаў" ("Rescuers' Lane", commemorating the Belarusian emergency handlers) in Belarusian, while its Russian name was a transliteration from Belarusian, "проезд Ратавальников", instead of Russian "проезд спасателей".

In 2014, the term "soft Belarusization" was used in reference to the event when Lukashenko, for the first time, gave the Independence Day speech in Belarusian. There are several explanations given to this change. Lukashenko himself said it is a warning for those who "encroach on the unity of the nation". Alexander Yarashevich thinks it is an attempt to distance Belarus from Russia in view of the (then) recent outbreak of the Russo-Ukrainian War. It has also been explained as an attempt to enhance the national identity of Belarus by catering to nationalist-oriented opposition movements.

In 2016, the Belarusian government included "Vyshyvanka Day" — an event launched by the Belarusian cultural and retail initiative Symbal.by in 2014 — in the official program of events dedicated to the Year of Culture. Since then, the holiday has been celebrated in Minsk and other cities at the state level.

The 2019 document "Doctrine of Information Security of the Republic of Belarus" says: "The Belarusian language, along with constitutionally established bilingualism in the state, contributes to enhancing the national identity of Belarusian society, and the formation of its spirituality. Expansion of social functions and communicative possibilities of the Belarusian language, its full and comprehensive development, alongside other elements of national culture, act as guarantor of the state’s humanitarian security." At the same time, Belarusian officials use an evasive language to indicate the "soft Belarusization" means neither distancing from Russia nor a definite turn to the West.

There has also been an observed shift in the attitude to the historical Belarusian symbols and events, which were a sharp rift between the Belarusian establishment and the opposition, including the White-red-white flag and the anniversary of the Belarusian National Republic.

Two new monuments, to Tadeusz Kościuszko and to Duke Algirdas, are also viewed as an element of enhancing the Belarusian identity as well as a confrontation with the Russian World: Kościuszko led a 1794 uprising against the Russian Empire and Algirdas expanded the territory of the Grand Duchy of Lithuania into the lands of modern Belarus.

The scope of "soft Belarusization" remained limited. In particular, in 2019, the draft-law about state support for the Belarusian language was not accepted.

Even this "soft" policy caused enough criticism from Russia that Lukashenko himself spoke out: "It's disgusting to listen to some of the Russian partisan “tongues” that we've almost got soft Belarusization going on here, that we have something else going on here, that we are almost U-turning somewhere." Russian critics see this policy as Lukashenko's shift away from his support of the Belarus-Russia integration strategy.

In January 2022, Lukashenko spoke in favor of the Belarusian language as a distinguishing feature of the nation: "You must understand that what sets us apart from others is the Belarusian language. We shouldn't abandon that. We need to think about making sure every Belarusian knows it." Referring to the clamp-down of the 2020–2021 Belarusian protests, he said that "we've thrown out the baby" and emphasised that "my policy is not one of soft Belarusization. That's complete nonsense, a fabrication."
