= Bosniakisation =

Process of cultural assimilation in parts of southern Europe

Bosniakisation designates the process of ethnic and cultural assimilation of non-Bosniak individuals or groups into the Bosniak ethnocultural corpus. Historically, bosniakisation was directed mainly towards some other South Slavic groups, like ethnic Muslims (Muslimani) in former Yugoslavia. Since Bosniaks are Sunni Muslims, Bosniakisation was also manifested towards some distinctive ethnoreligious minorities within Serbian and Croatian national corpus, mainly towards Serbian Muslims and Croatian Muslims. The process had its peak in 1993, when the Bosnian Muslim political leadership adopted the Bosniak name.

== History ==
This process was initiated in Bosnia and Herzegovina, originally during the period of Austro-Hungarian administration (1878–1918), when the first political projects were designed to create an integral "Bosnian", and then a special "Bosniak" nation. An integral "Bosnian" project proved to be unachievable even during the Austro-Hungarian administration, as not only the Bosnian Serbs but also the Bosnian Croats offered determined resistance to the creation of an integral "Bosnian" nation. Therefore, the focus shifted to a special "Bosniak" project, which gained a firm foothold in the Bosnian-Herzegovinian government. The key role in the design and implementation of these projects was played by Austro-Hungarian Minister Benjamin Kalai, who from 1882 to 1903 was responsible for Bosnia and Herzegovina.

As a foothold for Bosniak ethnogenesis and history, Bogomilism and a non-Slavic origin had been contrived. Then, after the direct influence of the Ottoman Conquest, a cultural identity was imposed (through the process of Islamization). This gave to the ultimate expression of a Bosniak specificity, which has led to the religious doctrine of ethnos. The Bosniak project was restarted at the time of the breakup of Yugoslavia, when Yugoslavian Muslims decided to rename themselves ethnic "Bosniaks". This process initially affected much of Bosnia and Herzegovina. Then it spread to northeastern Montenegro and southwestern Serbia, including the Raška region, as well as parts of Kosovo.

By the early 1990s, a vast majority of Bosnian Muslims identified as ethnic Muslims. According to a poll from 1990, only 1.8% of the citizens of Bosnia and Herzegovina supported the idea of a "Bosniak" national identity (by then already an essentially archaic term), while 17% considered the name to encompass all of the inhabitants of Bosnia and Herzegovina. Their main political party, the Party of Democratic Action, rejected the idea of Bosniak identity and managed to expel those who promoted it. The supporters of the Bosniak nationhood established their political party, the Muslim Bosniak Organisation, and received only 1.1% of the votes during the 1990 general election. At the 1991 census, 1,496 people identified as Muslims-Bosniaks, 1,285 as Bosniaks and 876 as Bosniaks-Muslims, totalling to 3,657 or 0.08% of the total population.

On 27 September 1993, however, after the leading political, cultural, and religious representatives of Bosnian Muslims held an assembly and at the same time when they rejected the Owen–Stoltenberg peace plan adopted the Bosniak name deciding to "return to our people their historical and national name of Bosniaks, to tie ourselves in this way for our country of Bosnia and its state-legal tradition, for our Bosnian language and all spiritual tradition of our history". The main reason for the SDA to adopt the Bosniak identity, only three years after expelling the supporters of the idea from their party ranks, was due to foreign policy considerations. One of the leading SDA figures Džemaludin Latić, the editor of the official gazette of the party, commented on the decision stating that: "In Europe, he who doesn't have a national name, doesn't have a country" and that "we must be Bosniaks, that what we are, to survive in our country". The decision to adopt the Bosniak identity was primarily influenced by the change of opinion of the former communist intellectuals such as Atif Purivatra, Alija Isaković and those who were a part of the pan-Islamists such as Rusmir Mahmutćehajić (who was a staunch opponent of Bosniak identity), all of whom saw the changing of the name to Bosniak as a way to connect the Bosnian Muslims to the country of Bosnia and Herzegovina.

The term "Bosniak" grew as a self-identification among Bosnian Muslim communities since its adoption in 1993, while Bosnian Serb and Croat politicians have continued to refer to them as Muslims. Some Serb and Croat communities expressed disapproval of the term, arguing that it portrayed Muslims as an ethnic superiority in Bosnia.

Bosniakisation was often manifested through cultural and educational programs. In 1996, the Atlantic Council of the United States noted that "Non-Muslims in Sarajevo, Tuzla, and other areas under Bosniak control feel increasingly alienated in their own communities as a result of a wide array of government decisions, from the "Bosniakization" of the school curriculum". Specific forms of Bosniakisation were also integrated into linguistic policy, and perception of regional history.

== Sandžak ==
Sandžak is a very ethnically diverse region. Most Muslims declared themselves ethnic Muslims in the 1991 census. By the 2002-2003 census, however, most of them declared themselves Bosniaks. There is still a significant minority that identifies simply as Muslims (by ethnicity).

The second half of the 19th century was pivotal in shaping the current ethnic and political landscape in Sandžak. Austria-Hungary supported Sandžak's separation from the Ottoman Empire, or at least its autonomy within it. The reason was to prevent Serbia and Montenegro from unifying, and allow Austria-Hungary's further expansion to the Balkans. Per these plans, Sandžak was seen as part of Bosnia and Herzegovina, while its Muslim population played a significant role, giving Austrian-Hungarians a pretext for protecting the Muslim minority from the Christian Orthodox Serbs.

There were a larger presence of Albanians in Sandžak in the past, however due to various factors such as migration, assimilation, along with mixing, many identify as Bosniaks instead.

Insisting on the imposition of Bosniaks and the spreading of a Bosniak project outside of Bosnia, a controversy erupted on the part of Yugoslav ethnic Muslims primarily in Serbia and Montenegro. In opposing the imposition of Bosniaks, president of the Muslim Matica in Montenegro, Dr. Avdul Kurpejović explicitly stressed in 2014 that the "Greater Bosniak Nationalist, Islamic Assimilation Program" is based exactly on the Islamic Declaration of Alija Izetbegović.

In 1700, after the Great Serb Migration, the Albanian Kelmendi and other Albanian tribes like the Shkreli of Rugova established themselves in the region of Rožaje and the neighboring town of Tutin in Serbia. The Shala, Krasniqi, and Gashi also moved into the region. Starting in the 18th century many people originating from the Hoti tribe have migrated to and live in Sandžak, mainly in the Tutin area, but also in Sjenica. Catholic Albanian groups which settled in Tutin in the early 18th century were converted to Islam in that period. Their descendants make up the large majority of the population of Tutin and the Pešter plateau.

Members of the Shkreli (known as Škrijelj /Serbian: Шкријељ) and Kelmendi (known as Klimenti /Serbian: Клименти) beginning around 1700 migrated into the lower Pešter and Sandžak regions. The Kelmendi chief had converted to Islam, and promised to convert his people as well. A total of 251 Kelmendi households (1,987 people) were resettled in the Pešter area on that occasion, however five years later a part of the exiled Kelmendi managed to fight their way back to their homeland, and in 1711 they sent out a large raiding force to bring back some other from Pešter too. The remaining Kelmendi and Shkreli converted to Islam and became Slavophones by the 20th century, and as of today they now self-identify as part of the Bosniak ethnicity, although in the Pešter plateau they partly utilized the Albanian language until the middle of the 20th century. There are still some Albanian villages in the Pešter region: Ugao, Boroštica, Doliće and Gradac. Factors such as some intermarriage undertaken by two generations with the surrounding (Muslim) Bosniak population along with the difficult circumstances of the Yugoslav wars (1990s) made local Albanians opt to refer to themselves in censuses as Bosniaks. Elders in the villages still have a degree of fluency in the language.

The Slavic dialect of Gusinje and Plav (sometimes considered part of Sandžak) shows very high structural influence from Albanian. Its uniqueness in terms of language contact between Albanian and Slavic is explained by the fact that most Slavic-speakers in today's Plav and Gusinje are of Albanian origin.

== Gora ==
A number of Gorani people were a subject of Bosniakisation in recent history.

== See also ==
- Bosniaks
- Bosniak nationalism
- Muslims (ethnic group)
- Gorani people
- Serbs of Bosnia and Herzegovina
- Serbisation
- Croats of Bosnia and Herzegovina
- Croatisation

== Literature ==
- Atlantic Council of the United States (1996). Bosnia's Security and US Policy in the Next Phase: A Policy Paper. Washington: International Research and Exchanges Board.
- Dimitrova, Bohdana (2001). "Bosniak or Muslim? Dilemma of one Nation with two Names" (PDF). Southeast European Politics. 2 (2): 94–108.
- Bougarel, Xavier (2009). "Od "Muslimana" do "Bošnjaka": pitanje nacionalnog imena bosanskih muslimana" [From "Muslims" to "Bosniaks": the question of the national name of the Bosnian Muslims]. Rasprave o nacionalnom identitetu Bošnjaka – Zbornik radova [The discussions on the national identity of Bosniaks - a collection of papers]. Institut Za Istoriju.
- Bougarel, Xavier (2018). Islam and Nationhood in Bosnia-Herzegovina: Surviving Empires. New York: Bloomsbury Publishing. ISBN 9781350003613.
- Đečević, Mehmed; Vuković-Ćalasan, Danijela; Knežević, Saša (2017). "Re-designation of Ethnic Muslims as Bosniaks in Montenegro: Local Specificities and Dynamics of This Process". East European Politics and Societies and Cultures. 31 (1): 137–157. doi:10.1177/0888325416678042. S2CID 152238874.
- Džaja, Srećko M. (2002). Die politische Realität des Jugoslawismus (1918-1991): Mit besonderer Berücksichtigung Bosnien-Herzegowinas. München: R. Oldenbourg Verlag. ISBN 9783486566598.
- Etnička obilježja stanovništva: rezultati za Republiku i po opštinama [Ethnic characteristics of the population: results for the Republic and by municipalities] (PDF) (in Serbo-Croatian). Sarajevo: Agency for Statistics of the Republic of Bosnia and Herzegovina. 1993.
- Fetahagić, Sead S. (2020). "The Most Golden Age: A Discourse Analysis of Representations of Medieval Bosnia in Secondary-School History Textbooks in the Federation of BiH". Nationhood and Politicization of History in School Textbooks: Nationhood and Politicization of History in School Textbooks. Cham: Palgrave Macmillan. pp. 181–212. ISBN 9783030381219.
- Górak-Sosnowska, Katarzyna (2011). Muslims in Poland and Eastern Europe: Widening the European Discourse on Islam. Warszaw: Faculty of Oriental Studies, University of Warszaw. ISBN 978-8390322957.
- Jović, Dejan (2013). "Identitet Bošnjaka/Muslimana". Politička Misao: Časopis za Politologiju. 50 (4): 132–159.
- Kraljačić, Tomislav (1987). Kalajev režim u Bosni i Hercegovini (1882-1903). Sarajevo: Veselin Masleša. ISBN 9788621000968.
- Kurpejović, Avdul (2014). Analiza nacionalne diskriminacije i asimilacije Muslimana Crne Gore. Podgorica: Matica muslimanska Crne Gore. ISBN 9789940620035.
- Kurpejović, Avdul (2018). Ko smo mi Muslimani Crne Gore (PDF). Podgorica: Matica muslimanska Crne Gore.
- Lehfeldt, Werner (1999). "Zur gegenwärtigen Situation des Bosnischen". Wiener Slavistisches Jahrbuch. 45: 83–90.
- Pokos, Nenad; Hasanbegović, Zlatko (2014). "(Tro)jedan narod: Bošnjaci, Muslimani i Hrvati muslimani u Hrvatskoj u popisima stanovništva 2001. i 2011. godine". Društvena Istraživanja. 23 (3): 427–448. doi:10.5559/di.23.3.03.
- Tanasković, Darko (2000). Islam i mi (1. ed.). Beograd: Partenon. ISBN 9788677430078.
- Veljović, Bojana M. (2021). "Морфолошке одлике глаголских облика говора Тутина, Новог Пазара и Сјенице" [Morphological features of verb forms in speech from Tutin, Novi Pazar and Sjenica] (PDF). Српски дијалектолошки зборник (68): 197-199.
