= Bulgarisation =

Spread of Bulgarian culture

Bulgarisation (Bulgarian: българизация, romanized: bălgarizaciya), also known as Bulgarianisation (Bulgarian: побългаряване, romanized: pobălgaryavane), is the spread of Bulgarian culture beyond the Bulgarian ethnic space carried out through educational and ecclesial campaigns, and, at times, policies of forced assimilation and emigration. Within the borders of modern-day Bulgaria, historic Bulgarisation efforts were primarily, but not exclusively, directed at Muslims. There were also Bulgarisation campaigns in present-day Greece, Kosovo, North Macedonia, and Serbia, particularly during the First and Second World Wars.

== History ==
=== Ottoman rule ===
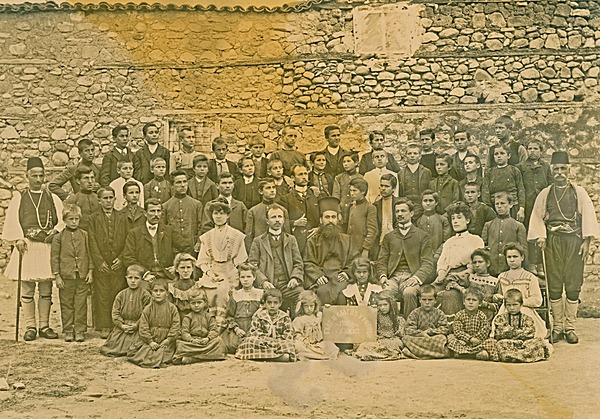
Demir Hisar Bulgarian School in modern-day North Macedonia during Ottoman rule.

Bulgaria was ruled by the Ottoman Empire for around 500 years. Under Ottoman rule, much of the previous expansion of the Bulgarian ethnic group was reversed. While the Ottoman rulers provided for some cultural and religious autonomy under the "Millet System", and Bulgarians were briefly granted their own Bulgarian Millet, Bulgarians were no longer politically dominant in their own lands. While the Ottomans did not generally require Bulgarians to convert to Islam, the empire did enforce the Jizya tax and other forms of discrimination and practices on non-Muslims (such as the Devshirme). Those Bulgarians who converted to Islam but retained their Slavic language and customs became known as Pomaks. A subset of these converts to Islam also assimilated into the Turkish ethnic group. Between that assimilation and the settlement of many Turkish people in Bulgaria, much of modern-day Bulgaria had an ethnic Turkish Muslim majority prior to Bulgarian independence.

==== Bulgarian Exarchate ====
In 1870, Sultan Abdulaziz authorised the establishment of an autonomous Bulgarian Exarchate. The Bulgarian Exarchate exercised authority over northern Bulgaria, most of Thrace and Macedonia. The establishment of the Exarchate meant official recognition of a separate Bulgarian millet, and in this case the religious affiliation became a consequence of national allegiance. Shortly after its establishment, the Exarchate launched educational campaigns which managed to implant Bulgarian national ideology in the Macedonian Slavs.

=== The Principality and Tsardom ===
Following the decisive defeat of the Ottoman Empire in the Russo-Turkish War (1877–1878), Bulgaria regained independence, though initially it remained under limited Ottoman suzerainty. Following the Ottoman defeat, both Russian occupation authorities, during and immediately after the war, as well as Bulgarian administrators attempted to remove traces of Ottoman rule from the area where possible. The Bulgarian nation was ideally to consist of Slavic Orthodox Christians. The state pressed Christians who adhered to the Exarchate to declare themselves as Bulgarians, while those loyal to the Ecumenical Patriarchate were labelled "Greek". Bulgaria made progress in promoting a Bulgarian national identity among the population without a clear nationality, though strong support for nationalism in the cities often hid widespread discontent. In spite of treaty obligations requiring Bulgaria to protect its Muslim subjects, Islamic buildings of many kinds were destroyed (including mosques, schools, and homes).

Assimilation efforts continued thereafter, and many Muslims left Bulgaria in response. In the first post-independence census conducted by the Principality of Bulgaria 26.3% of respondents declared their mother tongue to be Turkish or Gagauz (the two were part of a single combined category), but by 1934 (the final census conducted by the Tsardom of Bulgaria) only 9.7% of respondents declared themselves to be ethnically Turkish and information on the Turkic Gagauz population was not collected. This precipitous drop in the Turkish population of Bulgaria meant that by the time of the People's Republic of Bulgaria, many formerly Turkish-majority areas had become majority ethnically Bulgarian.

==== Rodina Movement ====
Assimilation efforts in the Tsardom of Bulgaria increased in the late 1930s and early 1940s. The "Homeland" or "Rodina" (Bulgarian: Родина) movement, originally founded in part by ethnic-Bulgarian Muslims, was associated with particularly acute assimilation efforts in the Tsardom. The movement focused on Bulgarising "Bulgaro-Mohammedan" people in the country.

While the origins of the Rodina movement were popular, the Tsardom eventually provided financial support for the movement. The Bulgarian language was introduced into Muslim worship, and the wearing of traditional clothing among "Bulgaro-Mohammedan" people was curtailed. Eventually, the Ministry of Internal Affairs came to appoint "Bulgaro-Mohammedan" Muftis.

Most notable, however, was the name-changing drive, which was mandated by the Tsardom from 1942. Those identified as ethnic-Bulgarian Muslims were made to change their names, though prior to 1942 name-changes were officially voluntary. Following the passage of the "Bulgarianisation of the Mohammedan Names of Bulgaro-Mohammedans" law, 60,000 were compelled to change their names, though many were able to revert to their non-Bulgarian names following the fall of the regime.

==== Modern Kosovo, North Macedonia, and Serbia ====
The region of present-day North Macedonia was part of the Ottoman Empire until 1912. At that time, most independent European observers viewed the Slavs of Macedonia as Bulgarians or as Macedonian Slavs, while their association with the Bulgarian cause was almost universally accepted by Western scholars. However, the majority of local peasants did not have a clear sense of national identity, while clear national identity was espoused mostly by a small social class of educated people – intelligentsia. Immediately after annexation of Vardar Macedonia to the Kingdom of Serbia, during the Balkan wars (1912–1913), Macedonian Slavs were confronted with a state-policy of forced Serbianisation. An anti-Bulgarian cultural campaign was carried out in the areas under Serbian control, in which Bulgarian schools and churches were closed, while clergy and teachers were expelled.

During both the First and Second World War, Bulgaria administered occupation zones in the modern-day state of North Macedonia as well as parts of Kosovo and Serbia. During both occupations, Bulgarian authorities implemented policies aimed at the Bulgarisation of the local population.

In 1915, Bulgaria came to occupy half of the Kingdom of Serbia. The goal of the Bulgarian government was to create pure Bulgarian territories by denationalising and assimilating the other Slavs. The Bulgarian occupations were administered by both military and civilian officials, almost all of whom were brought in from Bulgaria. In a report to his supreme command, the Austro-Hungarian colonel Julius Lustig wrote that the Bulgarian authorities were ruthless and brutal in introducing their new administration, and that Bulgarisation was implemented through the destruction of the local intelligentsia and by the enforced introduction of the Bulgarian language. Shops, libraries and church archives were raided, and schools and churches closed or destroyed. The Serbian Cyrillic alphabet was also prohibited in schools. In Macedonia, Bulgarian clerks, teachers, and priests opened schools, organised associations, and published materials, often alongside coercive measures. Similar policies were applied to Albanians and Turks in Kosovo and Macedonia.

The occupation authorities in Macedonia sought to impose Bulgarisation by force, employing measures that were regarded by people from outside as ridiculous. Religious paintings, icons, saints and inscriptions were replaced with Bulgarian ones, and traces of Serbian rule in medieval Macedonia were erased. Schools were reorganised with the primary goal of promoting Bulgarian national identity rather than to improve education. Attendance at Bulgarian schools and participation in national and religious events were made compulsory, with economic penalties for noncompliance. Individuals who refused to comply with the authorities and become Bulgarian faced severe repression, including torture, internment, and gruesome killings. Historian Andrej Mitrović stated that the Bulgarisation in Macedonia assumed the character and proportions of psychological terror. The Austro-Hungarian supreme command in Kosovo reported:

As in the case throughout Macedonia, the basic principle is that the land must become purely Bulgarian, even at the cost of transforming it into a Bulgarian desert.

Resistance to the occupation and Bulgarisation led to the Toplica Uprising of 1917 in Southern Serbia.

During the Second World War, Bulgaria occupied most of Vardar Macedonia, then officially called Vardar Banovina. Until then, the Serbian authorities had carried out a state-policy of Serbianisation and de-Bulgarisation occurred. At the same time the Bulgarian government promoted Bulgarisation by supporting pro‑Bulgarian organisations in Macedonia to advance its territorial claims. The Bulgarian authorities considered the Macedonian Slavs as no more than unruly Bulgarians.

Soon after the occupation began, the authorities realised that only some of the Slavic Macedonians felt Bulgarian or were pro-Bulgarian. Consequently, they initiated a program of intense Bulgarisation in all occupied areas. Some researchers describe this process as "re-Bulgarisation" and "de-Serbianisation". Schools and libraries were closed, and cultural institutions, archives, cemeteries, and churches were destroyed. Measures were taken to eliminate Serbian and Macedonian identity markers, including personal and place names, language use, and national symbols. These actions were accompanied by repression and despotism. Local Serbo-Croatian press was banned and youth organisations inspired by fascist ideas were established. Shortly after, schools at all levels were reorganised to promote Bulgarian national feeling among the Macedonians, and large numbers of teachers were imported from Bulgaria while the Macedonian teachers who were suitable were sent to Bulgaria for study and indoctrination. Those who were not suitable were transferred to administrative jobs outside of the school system or dismissed. Serbian personnel in banking, industry, and commerce were removed and replaced with Bulgarians from Bulgaria or Macedonian Bulgarians. The majority of those who identified as Macedonians either resisted the policies or remained passive. Remaining forests and grazing lands that had not been nationalised before were also nationalised.

Harsh treatment by occupying Bulgarian troops further reduced pro-Bulgarian feeling among Macedonian Slavs. The intensive Bulgarisation policies generated significant discontent in Macedonia, leading even anti‑Yugoslav Macedonians who returned from exile to seek allies among the communists. All of these events confirmed to the Macedonians that the Bulgarian regime behaved in the same oppressive manner as the previous Serbian-dominated Yugoslav one. So, the Bulgarisation campaign ultimately failed. The German historian Björn Opfer drew parallels between Nazi Germany's Germanisation campaigns and the Bulgarisation effort in Macedonia. He wrote that Bulgarian authorities acted considerably more repressively compared to the other Axis states, such as Romania, Hungary and Finland.

==== Greek Macedonia and Thrace ====
At the beginning of the 20th century, Eastern Macedonia and Western Thrace were ethnically diverse. Greeks, Slavs, Turks, and others could be found throughout the region. The Tsardom of Bulgaria gained most of what is now the Greek administrative region of Eastern Macedonia and Thrace in the Balkan Wars. It further occupied some of the Greek-assigned portion of Eastern Macedonia around the cities of Drama and Kavala for half of the First War.

As a result of its defeat in the war, Bulgaria was made to cede the region to Greece and also enter into a population exchange with Athens that resulted in the expulsion of many Bulgarians from the region. Augmented by an influx of Greek refugees from the Ottoman Empire and elsewhere in the Balkans, the Greek government carried out additional expulsions and settled Greeks in the region. For example, in 1923 the Governor General of Salonica advocated for the settlement of hundreds of thousands of "New Greeks" in the newly-conquered areas. By 1929, the League of Nations estimated that 92,000 Slavs had left the area for Bulgaria and 46,000 Greek speakers had been settled in their stead. Less formally, the Greek government expelled 5,000 alleged subversives and their family members to Bulgaria.

Greece also implemented a number of policies aimed at the assimilation of remaining non-Greeks. For example, it closed down all "Exarchist" schools in areas under its control. Most of these were Bulgarian-medium institutions, owing to their historic association with the Bulgarian Exarchate.

During World War II, Bulgaria gained control over most of the lands it had ceded to Greece as well as some lands which had been assigned to Greece following the Second Balkan War. In these areas, Bulgaria implemented a number of assimilationist policies. In education, Bulgarian authorities attempted to replace the Greek language with Bulgarian as a medium of education. From May 1941, Bulgaria incorporated the newly-conquered areas into the national education system.

From the very beginning of the occupation, Bulgarian officials also condoned and encouraged the emigration of Greeks from the occupied areas. They also carried out targeted expulsion. By August 1941, nearly all Greek scientists, in particular, had been expelled from the region. By June 1943, 110,000 had left the region occupied by Bulgaria. In their place, around 100,000 Bulgarian colonists were settled.

Opposition to initial occupation and assimilation policies led to the Drama Uprising of 1941.

=== People's Republic of Bulgaria ===
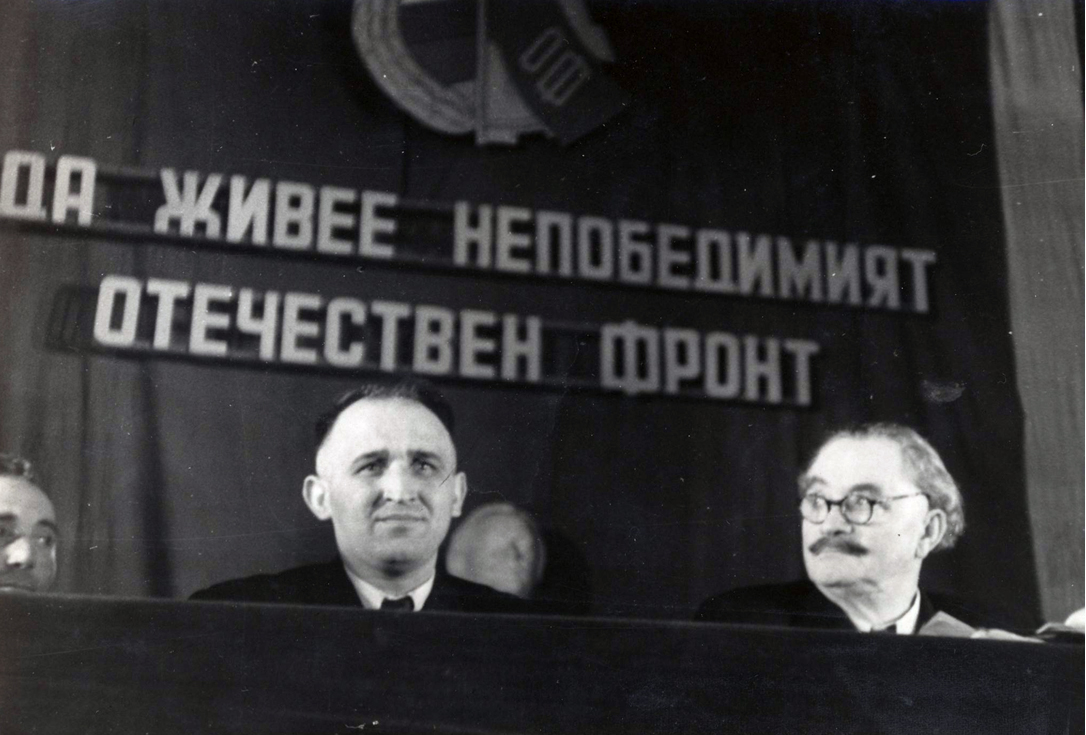
Todor Zhivkov and Georgi Dimitrov at a congress of the Fatherland Front in 1946.

==== Initial Changes ====
The Soviet Union initially forced Bulgaria to recognise many minority ethnic groups in the country and change its practices towards its Muslim minority. The Bulgarian Communist Party was made to bring Bulgarian Muslims into the party, promote the development of the nation's Turkish minority, and attempt to "incite" that minority to bring the Socialist revolution to Turkey. The communist regime in Sofia, however, continued to carry out some Bulgarisation policies directed at Bulgarian Muslims and Turks, including bringing Muslim elites into the fold of the state. Notably, around 160,000 were even compelled to leave Bulgaria between 1950 and 1951.

At that time, mass repressions, political murders, forced collectivisation and industrialisation began. Tens of thousands were imprisoned without trial in labor camps or interned. As a concession to the Yugoslavian side, Bulgarian authorities agreed to the recognition of a distinct Macedonian ethnicity and language as part of their own population in the Bulgarian part of geographical Macedonia. Thus, in the summer of 1946, at a joint Bulgarian-Yugoslav meeting in Moscow, Stalin approved a Yugoslav plan to grant cultural autonomy to Pirin Macedonia, and the Bulgarian communists gave its consent to it. Stalin also demanded that Bulgaria develop a "Macedonian consciousness" much more intensively among the population in the Pirin region, stating that the fact that such a consciousness had not yet developed meant nothing. According to him, there was no Belarusian identity in Belarus when it was declared a Soviet republic, and later a Belarusian nation was successfully formed. At the same time, the organisation of the old Bulgarian nationalist movement the Internal Macedonian Revolutionary Organization (IMRO) was suppressed by the Bulgarian communist authorities. Former IMRO functionaries, local leaders and wealthier citizens were arrested or killed. The families of all the convicts were interned in various places in Northern Bulgaria. From the beginning of 1946, a much better organised and directed state propaganda began in Pirin Macedonia, which had a sharply offensive character.

==== Change in Direction ====
Following the death of Stalin, Todor Zhivkov rose to the leadership of the Bulgarian Communist Party and the country by extension. Under Zhivkov, the conception of the Bulgarian nation was further developed, and Bulgarisation campaigns were carried out vigorously. By the 1960s, new versions of the Bulgarisation campaigns of the pre-communist era were implemented. In the 1956 census, the number of ethnic Macedonians in Bulgaria was 187,789 individuals, despite pressures by the Bulgarian authorities to declare as Bulgarians. By 1958, the Bulgarian Communist Party adopted the stance that Macedonian nation did not exist. Individuals and whole families who identified especially strongly or vocally as ethnic Macedonians were forced to resettle in towns in northern Bulgaria. In the 1965 census, the number of ethnic Macedonians in Bulgaria dropped to 9,632 individuals. Zhivkov mentioned a "manoeuvre" he had employed, known only to four persons, to turn the all the population of the region of Pirin Macedonia into Bulgarians "within a few days". This was described by researchers as "statistical genocide" of the Macedonian minority.

Notably, the idea that Bulgarian Muslims shared a Slavic and Christian origin with the Bulgarians originated in the 1960s during Zhivkov's rule, though claims that "Bulgaro-Mohammedans" were essentially Bulgarian originated earlier. The regime in Sofia often fell back on claims that the Ottoman Empire had planned and executed the "Islamization" and "Turkification" of Bulgaria. In 1985, a senior Bulgarian Communist Party official proclaimed that “The Bulgarian nation has no parts of other peoples and nations”.

==== Revival Process ====
Notable among the Bulgarisation campaigns of the Zhivkov era was the "Revival Process", a 1980s attempt to assimilate the Muslim population of Bulgaria. During the "Revival Process" assimilation efforts increased and those Muslims who had not already been made to adopt new, sufficiently Bulgarian names in place of their original Turkish or Islamic names were made to do so. The "Revival Process" was followed by the "Big Excursion" which saw the expulsion of over 300,000 Bulgarian Turks from the country (and subsequent return of some of the victims). Following the fall of Todor Zhivkov, the "Revival Process" was reversed and people were free to revert to their previous names or adopt new names as they wished. Regardless, some of those who had been made to adopt a "Bulgarian" name continued using both it and their restored name.

== Republic of Bulgaria ==
An ethnic map of Bulgaria according to the 2011 Bulgarian census.

The Republic of Bulgaria is a member of the Council of Europe, European Union, and European Court of Human Rights. It is additionally party to a number of international treaties aimed at the protection of national minorities and human rights, such as the Framework Convention for the Protection of National Minorities.

In line with these policies and treaties and despite historic tensions with its Muslim minority, Bulgaria's current constitution provides for freedom of religion, though it does recognise the Bulgarian Orthodox Church as the "traditional religion" of Bulgaria. Bulgaria has further reformed funding schemes for religious groups, benefiting its Muslim community. The Council of Europe wrote in 2020 that:

...authorities are making efforts to promote inter-ethnic and interreligious tolerance but these are regularly undermined by xenophobic, anti-Romani, Islamophobic and antisemitic statements by high-level politicians and media reporting of a similar nature...

Bulgaria has employed policies of passportization and cultural diplomacy aimed to attract and Bulgarise members of the Macedonian community. In 2018, Bulgaria faced a scandal over alleged sale of citizenship documents. Former Citizenship Council director Katya Mateva exposed a scheme in which the State Agency for Bulgarians Abroad issued thousands of falsified certificates of Bulgarian origin to Macedonians and Albanians in exchange for bribes.

Bulgarisation has also affected the Romanians in Bulgaria, who were largely assimilated.

== See also ==
- Anti-Turkism

== Bibliography ==
- Advisory Committee (26 May 2020). Advisory Committee on the Framework Convention for the Protection of National Minorities: Fourth Opinion on Bulgaria (Report). Council of Europe. ACFC/OP/IV(2020)001.
- Angelov, Veselin (2004). Хроника на едно национално предателство: Опитите за насилствено денационализиране на Пиринска Македония 1944–1949 г. [Chronicle of a National Betrayal: Attempts at the Forced Denationalization of Pirin Macedonia, 1944–1949] (in Bulgarian). София: Гергана.
- Anscombe, Frederick F. (2014). State, Faith, and Nation in Ottoman and Post-Ottoman Lands. Cambridge University Press. ISBN 9781107729674.
- Apostolov, Mario (2018). Religious Minorities, Nation States and Security: Five Cases from the Balkans and the Eastern Mediterranean. Taylor & Francis. ISBN 978-1-351-78441-2.
- Banac, Ivo (1984). The National Question in Yugoslavia: Origins, History, Politics. London and Ithaca: Cornell University Press. ISBN 978-0-8014-1675-0.
- Baev, Jordan (2010). "Stalinist terror in Bulgaria, 1944–1956". In McDermott, Kevin; Stibbe, Matthew (eds.). Stalinist Terror in Eastern Europe: Elite Purges and Mass Repression. Manchester: Manchester University Press. pp. 180–197. ISBN 978-0-7190-7776-0.
- Brooks, Robin Sophia (2004). Ethnic Self-Identification and Nation-Building in Post-Communist Bulgaria (Ph.D. thesis thesis). University of California, Berkeley.
- Calic, Marie-Janine (2019). A History of Yugoslavia. Purdue University Press. ISBN 978-1-61249-563-7.
- Carabott, Philip (2005). Aspects of the Hellenization of Greek Macedonia, ca. 1912–ca. 1959 (Report). Cambridge Papers in Modern Greek.
- Crampton, Richard J. (1997). A Concise History of Bulgaria (1st Edition). Cambridge University Press. ISBN 0-521-85085-1.
- Crampton, Richard J. (2003). Eastern Europe in the Twentieth Century—and After. Routledge. ISBN 978-1-134-71222-9.
- Crampton, Richard J. (2006). A Concise History of Bulgaria (2nd Edition). Cambridge University Press. p. 74. ISBN 0-521-61637-9.
- "Convention Between Greece and Bulgaria Respecting Reciprocal Emigration" (PDF). American Journal of International Law. 14 (S4): 356–360. 1920. doi:10.2307/2212906. JSTOR 2212906.
- Danforth, Loring M. (1997). The Macedonian Conflict: Ethnic Nationalism in a Transnational World. Princeton University Press. ISBN 0-691-04356-6.
- Daskalov, Rumen (2004). The Making of a Nation in the Balkans: Historiography of the Bulgarian Revival. Central European University Press. ISBN 963-9241-83-0.
- Demeter, Gábor; Bottlik, Zsolt (2021). Maps in the Service of the Nation: The Role of Ethnic Mapping in Nation-Building and Its Influence on Political Decision-Making Across the Balkan Peninsula (1840–1914) (PDF). DigiOst. Vol. 12. Berlin: Frank & Timme GmbH (Verlag für wissenschaftliche Literatur). doi:10.23665/DigiOst/IOS-12. ISBN 978-3-7329-0665-9.
- Detrez, Raymond (2010). The A to Z of Bulgaria. Scarecrow Press. ISBN 9780810872028.
- Drezov, K. (1999). "Macedonian identity: an overview of the major claims". In Pettifer, J. (ed.). The New Macedonian Question. St Antony’s Series. London: Palgrave Macmillan. doi:10.1057/9780230535794_4.
- Deutsche Welle (22 January 2019). "Да си купиш българско гражданство" [Buying Bulgarian citizenship]. Deutsche Welle (in Bulgarian).
- Eide, Asbjørn (1993). Broadening the Frontiers of Human Rights: Essays in Honour of Asbjørn Eide. Scandinavian University Press. ISBN 9788200410973.
- Eminov, Ali (2007). "Social Construction of Identities: Pomaks in Bulgaria" (PDF). Journal on Ethnopolitics and Minority Issues in Europe. 6 (2). European Centre for Minority Issues: 1–25.
- Gounaris, Basil G. (1995). "Social Cleavages and National 'Awakening' in Ottoman Macedonia" (PDF). East European Quarterly. 29 (4): 409–426.
- Groueff, Stephane (1998). Crown of Thorns: The Reign of King Boris III of Bulgaria, 1918–1943. Madison Books. ISBN 978-1-56833-114-0.
- Gruev, Mihail (17 January 2012). "Насилие и идентичност: пиринска Македония в етнонационалните политики на комунистическия режим в България – Част 1" [Violence and Identity: Pirin Macedonia in the Ethnonational Policies of the Communist Regime in Bulgaria – Part 1]. Либерален преглед (in Bulgarian).
- Heraclides, Alexis (2020). The Macedonian Question and the Macedonians: A History. Taylor & Francis Group. ISBN 978-0-429-26636-2.
- "Briefing: Bulgaria's Muslims: From Communist assimilation to tentative recognition". Islamic Human Rights Commission. 7 July 2003. Archived from the original on 11 September 2025.
- Kamusella, Tomasz (2019). Ethnic Cleansing During the Cold War: The Forgotten 1989 Expulsion of Turks from Communist Bulgaria. Routledge. ISBN 978-1138480520.
- Kapitan, Atanasov (1897). "СТАТИСТИЧЕСКИ СБОРНИКЪ НА КНЯЖЕСТВО БЪЛГАРИЯ" [Statistical Compendium of the Principality of Bulgaria] (PDF). National Statistical Institute (Bulgaria) – StatLib (in Bulgarian). Archived from the original (PDF) on 18 January 2026.
- Kaufman, Stuart J. (2001). Modern hatreds: the symbolic politics of ethnic war. New York: Cornell University Press. p. 193. ISBN 0-8014-8736-6.
- Kotzageorgi, Xanthippi (1996). "Population changes in eastern Macedonia and in Thrace: the legislative "initiatives" of the Bulgarian authorities (1941–1944)". Balkan Studies. 37 (1).
- Kotzageorgi-Zymari, Xanthippi (2001). "Education as a Means for Nationalistic Propaganda: The Bulgarian Policy of Assimilation in Eastern Macedonia and Thrace 1941-1944". Balkan Studies. 42 (1): 115–124.
- Lazić, Jovana (2024). "Serbia at War". In Bartrop, Paul R. (ed.). The Routledge History of the First World War. Routledge. doi:10.4324/9781003363439.
- Livanios, Dimitris (17 April 2008). The Macedonian Question: Britain and the Southern Balkans 1939–1949. OUP Oxford. ISBN 978-0-19-152872-9.
- Marinov, Tchavdar (2010). La Question Macédonienne de 1944 à nos jours : Communisme et nationalism dans les Balkans. Éditions L’Harmattan.
- ""Двойната" самоличност на Феим (Петър) Чаушев е престъпление" [The "double" identity of Feim (Peter) Chaushev is a crime]. Mediapool (in Bulgarian).
- Mitrović, Andrej (2007). Serbia's Great War, 1914-1918. Purdue University Press. ISBN 9781557534767.
- Mojzes, Paul (2011). Balkan Genocides: Holocaust and Ethnic Cleansing in the Twentieth Century. Rowman & Littlefield. ISBN 978-1-4422-0663-2.
- Murzaku, Ines Angeli (2009). Quo Vadis Eastern Europe?: Religion, State and Society After Communism. Longo Editore.
- "Население по местоживеене, пол и етническа група" [Population by place of residence, sex and ethnic group]. Censusresults.nsi.bg (in Bulgarian). National Statistical Institute (Bulgaria). 1900–2011. Archived from the original on 30 May 2017.
- Nedev, Nedyu (2007). Три държавни преврата или Кимон Георгиев и неговото време [Three Coups d'État, or Kimon Georgiev and His Time] (in Bulgarian). София: Сиела. ISBN 978-954-28-0163-4.
- Neuburger, Mary (March 2000). "Pomak Borderlands: Muslims on the Edge of Nations". Nationalities Papers. 28 (1): 181–198. doi:10.1080/00905990050002506.
- Opfer, Björn (2005). Im Schatten des Krieges Besatzung oder Anschluss - Befreiung oder Unterdrückung?; eine komparative Untersuchung über die bulgarische Herrschaft in Vardar-Makedonien 1915-1918 und 1941-1944 [In the Shadow of War: Occupation or Annexation – Liberation or Oppression? A Comparative Study of Bulgarian Rule in Vardar Macedonia, 1915–1918 and 1941–1944.] (in German). LIT Verlag. ISBN 9783825879976.
- Ortakovski, Vladimir (2021). Minorities in the Balkans. Brill. ISBN 9789004478992.
- Papavizas, George C. (2015). Claiming Macedonia: The Struggle for the Heritage, Territory and Name of the Historic Hellenic Land, 1862–2004. McFarland. ISBN 978-1-4766-1019-1.
- Pavlowitch, Stevan (2021). Hitler's New Disorder: The Second World War in Yugoslavia. Oxford University Press. ISBN 9780197580530.
- Perry, Duncan M. (1993). Stefan Stambolov and the Emergence of Modern Bulgaria, 1870–1895. Duke University Press. ISBN 0-8223-1313-8.
- Petrov, Petar; Temelski, Hristo (2003). Църква и църковен живот в Македония [Church and Church Life in Macedonia] (in Bulgarian). София: Македонски научен институт.
- Pietrobon, Emanuel (2021). "The Eagles Belt: The Unsuspected Stage of the Great Power Competition". Academicus: International Scientific Journal. 12 (24).
- Pettifer, James (2026). Greece and the New Balkans: Themes and Histories. Oxford: Signal Books. ISBN 9780722361757.
- Poulton, Hugh (2003). "Macedonians and Albanians as Yugoslavs". In Djokić, Dejan (ed.). Yugoslavism: Histories of a Failed Idea, 1918–1992. C. Hurst & Co. Publishers. ISBN 978-1-85065-663-0.
- Ramet, Sabrina P. (2006). The Three Yugoslavias: State-Building and Legitimation, 1918-2005. Indiana University Press. ISBN 9780253346568.
- Ristović, Milan (8 January 2017). "Occupation during and after the War (South East Europe)" (PDF).
- Roth, Klaus; Brunnbauer, Ulf (2008). Region, Regional Identity and Regionalism in Southeastern Europe. LIT Verlag Münster. ISBN 978-3-8258-1387-1.
- Tîrcomnicu, Emil (2011). "Cercetări etnografice la românii dintre Kozlodui și Șiștov" (PDF). Revista Română de Sociologie. Serie nouă (in Romanian). 22 (5–6): 495–514.
- Tomasevich, Jozo (2002). War and Revolution in Yugoslavia, 1941–1945. Stanford University Press. ISBN 0-8047-3615-4.
- Troebst, Stefan; Dabrowski, Patrice (2017). "Uses and Abuses of the Past". In Livezeanu, Irina; von Klimó, Arpád (eds.). The Routledge History of East Central Europe Since 1700. Routledge. ISBN 978-1-351-86342-1.
- United Nations High Commissioner for Refugees. "Refworld – Chronology for Turks in Bulgaria". Refworld.
- United States Department of State (15 May 2023). 2022 Report on International Religious Freedom: Bulgaria (PDF) (Report). US Department of State, Office of International Religious Freedom.
- Volaric, Klara (2026). "The Kingdom of Yugoslavia and Minorities in South Serbia". In Dalachanis, Angelos; Rappas, Alexis (eds.). Those Who Stayed, 1922: Political Transitions and Minority Strategies of Endurance in the Eastern Mediterranean. Routledge. doi:10.4324/9781003491064.
