= Boroštica =

Boroštica Бороштица Boroshticë
- Village (Selo)
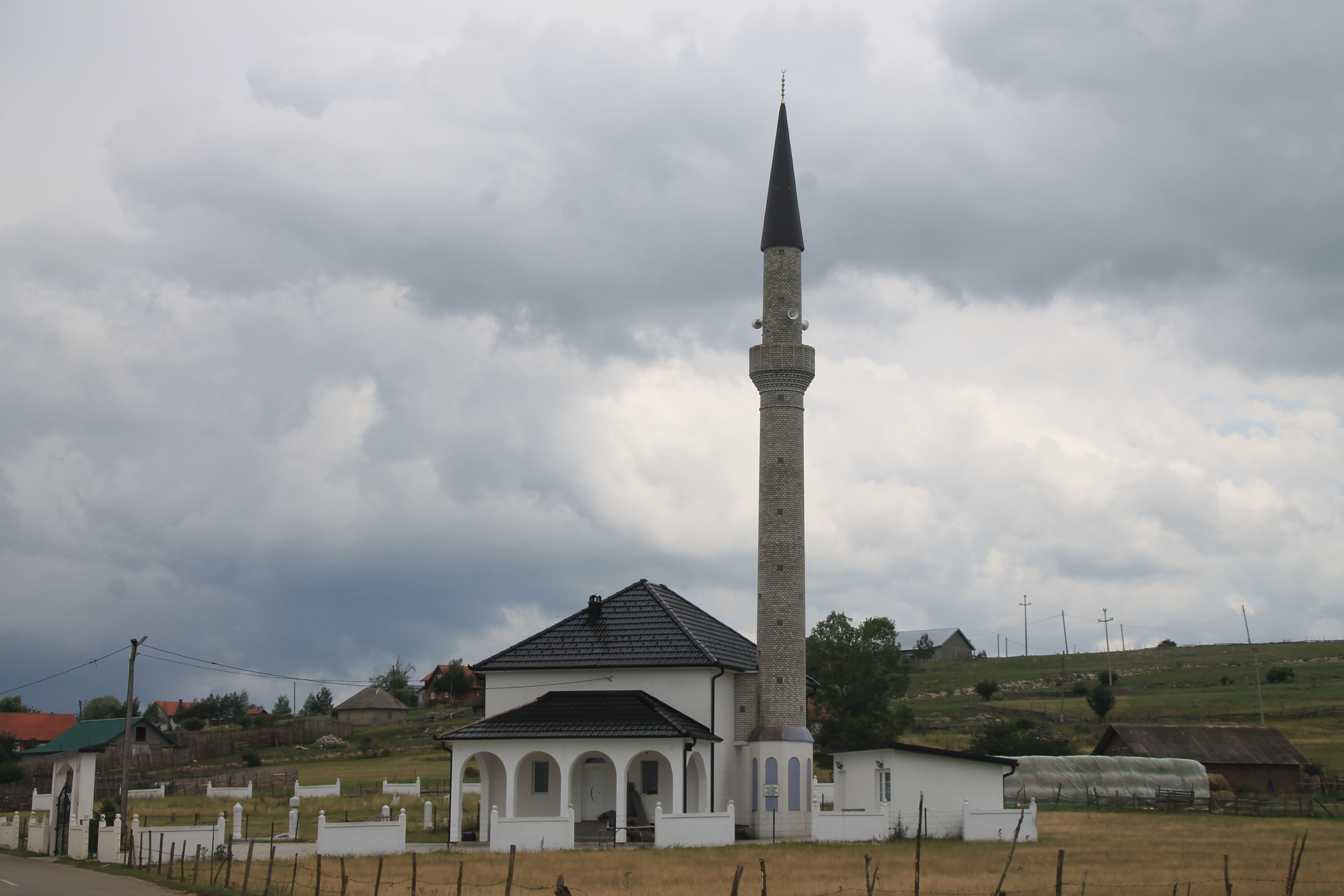
- Boroštica in 2026

- Location within Serbia
- Coordinates: 43°03′23″N 20°06′12″E
- Country: Serbia
- District: Raška District
- Municipality: Tutin
- Elevation: 1,136 m (3,727 ft)

Population (2011)
  - Total: 325
- Time zone: UTC+1 (CET)
  - Summer (DST): UTC+2 (CEST)
- Area code: 020
- Vehicle registration: NP

Boroštica (Serbian Cyrillic: Бороштица; Albanian: Boroshticë) is a village in the municipality of Tutin, Serbia. According to the 2002 census, the village has a population of 379 people.

Boroštica is one of three Albanian villages (Boroštica, Doliće and Ugao) in the Pešter region. Factors such as some intermarriage undertaken by two generations with the surrounding Bosniak population along with the difficult circumstances of the Yugoslav wars (1990s) made local Albanians opt to refer to themselves in censuses as Bosniaks. Elders in the village still have a degree of fluency in the language.
