= Garašanin =

Garašanin is a surname. Notable people with the surname include:

- Draga Garašanin (1921-1997), Serbian archaeologist
- Ilija Garašanin (1812-1874), Serbian statesman
- Milutin Garašanin (1843-1898), Serbian politician
