= Belarusization =

Belarusization (Belarusian: беларусізацыя, romanized: biełarusizacyja) was a policy of protection and advancement of the Belarusian language and recruitment and promotion of Belarusian nationalists within the government of the Belarusian SSR (BSSR) and the Belarusian Communist Party, conducted by the government of the BSSR in the 1920s.

Together with the 1920s policy of Ukrainization in the Ukrainian SSR, as well as other similar policies in other parts of the Soviet Union, it constituted the Soviet policy of korenization, an attempt by the Communist Party of the Soviet Union to win favor with non-Russian ethnic groups by temporarily reversing the effects of Russification within the Russian Empire and by promoting national cultures and languages in the Soviet national republics. The implementation of korenization effectively stopped by the second half of 1930s, to which the Great Purge contributed by elimination the national elites. Eventually it was reversed and replaced with the Soviet government's promotion of the Russian language as the "language of interethnic communication".

== Plan for Belarusization ==
The official policy of Belarusization was instituted in 1924 by the Central Executive Committee of the BSSR by creation of a special commission headed by A. I. Khatskevich. The special commission recommended the following measures:

- Transition of the Belarusian Republic's institutions and Belarusian units of the Red Army to the Belarusian language
- Promotion of Belarusian nationalists to leadership positions within the party, government and labor unions
- Organization of educational institutions in the Belarusian language, development of Belarusian literature and more.

The transition of Belarusian republic's institutions to the Belarusian language was planned to take place over a period of one to three years.

== Results of Belarusization ==
- By 1927, 80% of the BSSR's civil servants were fluent in the Belarusian language.
- By 1928, 80% of schools in the BSSR were transitioned to Belarusian as the language of instruction.

== End of Belarusization ==
However, with the rise of Stalinism in the 1930s, which repressed the national elites in all parts of the Soviet Union, and the concurrent return of the policies of Russification, Belarusization was quickly reversed, along with Ukrainization and all the other programs of korenization within the Soviet Union.

== See also ==
- Belarusian national revival, a 19th century movement for Belarusian language and culture in Russian Empire
- Soft Belarusization, a 21st-century policy in Belarus by Alexander Lukashenka
