= Montenegrinization =

Spread of Montenegrin culture, people, and language

Montenegrinization (Serbo-Croatian: Crnogorizacija/Црногоризација; Albanian: Malazezizimi) is the spread of Montenegrin culture, Montenegrin people, and the Montenegrin standard variety of the Serbo-Croatian language, either by social integration or by cultural or forced assimilation. There is an ongoing controversy over ethnic and linguistic identity in Montenegro, meaning that perspectives differ on what being or becoming "Montenegrin" even means, and how it relates to other (possibly overlapping) identities existing in the same country and neighbouring regions, its inhabitants and its diaspora, the language(s) they speak, the beliefs and cultural practices they hold to, how they view the relationship between nationality and ethnicity, and how they self-identify.

== Characteristics ==
In literature and journalism in the Serbo-Croatian language, in addition to the term Montenegrinization (or Montenegrinization) in a similar context, the terms dukljanizacija (referring to the medieval kingdom of Duklja) and Montenegrinization (Montenegrinization in general) are used. In literature and journalism in foreign languages, in addition to the English term montenegrisation, or montenegrinisation, other commonly used terms are: in German, Montenegrinisierung, in French, monténégrisation, in Spanish, montenegrización, and similar terms are used in literature in other languages (Russian: montenegrizacija, Croatian: crnogorizacija, Italian: montenegrizzazione. Portuguese : montenegrização.

The process of what is commonly called Montenegrinization is primarily directed towards Serbs in Montenegro and Croats in the Bay of Kotor, as well as towards the rest of the ethnic Muslims in Montenegro, who do not declare themselves as Bosniaks. In the historical context, the first hints of these phenomena can be recognized in the period after the end of the Ottoman period in the eastern parts of Old Herzegovina, which were acquired by the Principality of Montenegro in 1878 under the Treaty of San Stefano. Subsequently, efforts were made to replace the former regional identity of Herzegovinian Serbs with a new identity based on the regional traditions of Old Montenegro.

== Development ==
At the beginning of the 20th century, the process of Montenegrinization took on broader political and identity features. In the period between the two world wars, Montenegrinization was connected with the political activities of the so-called Greens (supporters of Montenegrin state independence), i.e. with the activities of the leaders of the Montenegrin Federalist Party, among whom Sekula Drljevic stood out. On the other hand, Savić Marković Štedimlija encouraged Montenegrinization from other motives. After the collapse of the Kingdom of Yugoslavia (1941) and the creation of the puppet Independent State of Montenegro (1941-1944), supporters of Montenegrins, under the auspices of the Italian and German occupiers, tried to affirm their ideas, in which they partially succeeded.

Since the Comintern in its program documents officially advocated the creation of a special "Montenegrin nation", such a position was adopted by the Communist Party of Yugoslavia. During the preparations for the Fifth National Conference of the CPY in the autumn of 1940, the Montenegrin communist Milovan Djilas resolutely advocated the independence of the "Montenegrin nation", supported by Edvard Kardelj and Josip Broz Tito, while Mosa Pijade stated that the process of forming a special Montenegrin nation was still in its transitional or developmental phase.

During the establishment of the National Liberation Committee for Montenegro and Boka, which was established in early 1942, the question arose as to the justification of including Polimlje in the future Montenegrin federal unit. It was obvious that in Polim areas annexed to the Kingdom of Montenegro in 1912, there was no developed awareness of regional Montenegrin affiliation. Therefore, the focus of work on the territorial encirclement of the future Montenegrin federal unit has been redirected to the Bay of Kotor, although this area has never been a part of Montenegro in history. In the first phase of building new authorities, the uniqueness of Boka was seemingly respected through equal emphasis on the official name of the National Anti-Fascist Council of People's Liberation of Montenegro and Boka (1943). However, already during the transformation of this body into the Montenegrin anti-fascist assembly of national liberation (1944), the mention of Boka was omitted from the new name, so this province, inhabited by nationally conscious Serbs and Croats, was brought under Montenegro for the first time in history.

After the liberation of the country in the fall of 1944 and the creation of the People's Republic of Montenegro as a federal unit within the new Yugoslavia (1945), the communist regime formalized a special Montenegrin nation, laying the groundwork for organized Montenegrinization. During the first post-war years, one of the most prominent proponents of such a policy was the Montenegrin communist Milovan Djilas, whose views became the backbone of the official party and state policy.

The party's guidelines were additionally shaped in the form of purposeful construction of Montenegrin's " national " history, and this complex task was entrusted to historian Jagoš Jovanović, who in 1947. published an extensive work titled: The Creation of the Montenegrin State and the Development of Montenegrin Nationality: History of Montenegro from the Beginning of the Eighth century to 1918. The appearance of this work, which was commissioned by the party and state apparatus, laid the foundation for the accelerated Montenegrinization of the entire regional history.

Forced Montenegrinization, which covered all areas of social life between 1944 and 1948, reached its peak during the first post-war census, which was conducted in March 1948. Official census results showed Montenegro as the most ethnically homogeneous federal unit, with over 90% of ethnic Montenegrins about the total population, which caused disbelief among experts and the general public. The entire census material was destroyed in the paper processing plants shortly after the "processing". Although Montenegrinization was carried out with the use of all means, the communist regime did not approach the officialization of the special Montenegrin language but based the language norm on the construction of the general Serbo-Croatian language.

After the disintegration of Yugoslavia and the change of the socio-political system, there was a partial and temporary turn in the attitude of the state authorities towards the conduct of national policy, so that the new Constitution of the Republic of Montenegro from 1992 stated: the language of Ijekavian pronunciation (Art. 9). However, after the creation of the State Union of Serbia and Montenegro (2003) and the subsequent declaration of independence of Montenegro (2006), the process of Montenegrinization took on the characteristics of official state policy, which has since been implemented in all areas of social, political and cultural of life. When a new one was adopted in 2007 The Constitution of the Republic of Montenegro, the provision on the official language was changed so that the Serbian language was replaced by the Montenegrin language (Article 13). Specific forms of religious Montenegrinization are reflected in the attempt to create a special Montenegrin Orthodox Church and even a special Montenegrin Catholic Church.

== Tribes ==
During the Ottoman Empire and since the independence of Montenegro, there have been many cases of Montenegrinization of Albanian tribes which moved into the region of present day Montenegro. This also has been the case for Albanian Muslims who moved into the regions of Montenegro, most notably in Sandžak in the 1700s after the Serbian migration. Some of the tribes which represented much of Montenegro's culture and history had Albanian origin. A Franciscan report of the 17th century illustrates the final stages of their acculturation. Its author writes that the Bratonožići, Piperi, Bjelopavlići, and Kuči: "nulla di meno essegno quasi tutti del rito serviano, e di lingua Illrica ponno piu presto dirsi Schiavoni, ch' Albanesi " (since almost all of them use the Serbian rite and the Illyric (Slavic) language, soon they should be called Slavs, rather than Albanians).

== See also ==
- Sekula Drljević
- Milo Đukanović
- Tribes of Montenegro
