= Symbal.by =

Belarusian company

SYMBAL.BY
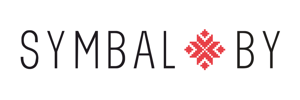
- Native name: Сымбаль.бай
- Industry: Retail, cultural initiatives
- Founded: May 12, 2014
- Founder: Paval Bielavus, Mikita Brouka
- Products: Clothing, accessories, books, cultural merchandise
- Website: symbalby.com

Symbal.by, stylized in all caps as SYMBAL.BY, is a Belarusian cultural and retail initiative founded in 2014 by civic activist Paval Bielavus. The company is known for promoting Belarusian culture, language, and national identity through merchandise, events, and social engagement. It became one of the most recognizable platforms offering goods featuring national symbols such as the Pahonia coat of arms and the white-red-white flag.

== History ==
Symbal.by was established on 12 May 2014 in Minsk. In October 2014, the company participated in the first Vyshyvanka Day – a festival of Belarusian culture – where it presented new traditional embroidered shirts (vyshymaikas) and children's clothing with folk ornamentation.

In addition to its retail activity, Symbal.by actively participated in cultural life, supporting and initiating campaigns aimed at promoting the Belarusian language and heritage. The store collaborated with local musicians, distributed their merchandise, and supported concerts, contributing to the development of the Belarusian music scene.

By March 2016, the company had sold over 15,000 embroidered shirts, with website visitors from 135 countries, despite the site being available only in Belarusian.

== Government pressure ==
In 2015, Symbal.by was investigated by police for allegedly distributing prohibited symbols. In 2020, the pressure escalated significantly. Authorities confiscated T-shirts with the slogan "PSIHOZ%" (a reference to President Alexander Lukashenko's dismissive remarks about the COVID-19 pandemic), and carried out frequent inspections and seizures of goods, equipment, and documents.

In June 2020, the store lost electricity due to the unexplained disappearance of a part from the circuit panel. Attempts to restore power via electricians and utility services were unsuccessful. In October 2020, over 200 packages with books, flags, and merchandise were detained by Minsk customs while en route to international buyers.

On 30 January 2021, officers of the Financial Investigations Department raided the store in Minsk; they detained employees Mikita Brouka, Kseniya Miklasheuskaya, Volha Ihnatava, Anastasiya Trafimchyk. Later, Brouka and Miklasheuskaya were sentenced to 20 days of administrative arrest each.

Due to ongoing repression, including the confiscation of goods worth over 50,000 BYN, Symbal.by announced the closure of its physical store. Large queues formed outside, and several people were detained. The company continued operating online.

== Support and backlash ==
Public figures voiced support for Symbal.by, including TV hosts Dzianis Kuryan and Dzmitry Kakhno (later replaced), showman Dzianis Dudzinski (removed from the hosting team of the Slavianski Bazaar festival), gymnast Melitina Staniouta (who lost her part-time job at ANT TV), actress Marta Holubeva, and others.

On 30 January 2021, the Minsk store was officially shut down after police officers confiscated all remaining merchandise, documents, and equipment. Co-founder and deputy director Mikita Brouka, along with three employees, received administrative sentences.

== Relocation and legal actions ==
In July 2022, Symbal.by opened a new store in Batumi, Georgia.

On 17 August 2022, the Partizansky District Court of Minsk designated Symbal.by's online platforms as "extremist materials"

On 11 May 2023, founder Pavel Belavus was sentenced to 13 years in a high-security penal colony. He was also fined 18,500 BYN, and his property, including vehicles and household appliances, was confiscated. He was convicted under several articles of the Belarusian Criminal Code, including:

- Article 361-1 – leading an extremist formation
- Article 356 – treason against the state
- Article 361 – public calls to seize state power
- Article 342 – organizing group actions that grossly violate public order

Pavel Belavus was released on September 16, 2026, along with 24 other political prisoners and deported to Lithuania.
