= Lira (awards) =

Belarusian awards show

Lira Belarusian: Ліра
- Awarded for: musical awards
- Sponsored by: The Ministry of Culture of the Republic of Belarus
- Country: Belarus
- Formerly called: The National Music Awards
- First award: December 13, 2011

Television/radio coverage
- Network: Capital TV (2011–2013); All-National TV (2014–present)

The Lira (Belarusian: Ліра) (previously, the National Music Awards (Belarusian: Нацыянальная музычная прэмія)) is a Belarusian set of national music awards in the field of popular music, which was founded on December 24, 2010, it was an initiative of the Ministry of Culture of the Republic of Belarus. Since 2011, the Lira has been broadcast by the Capital TV channel.

== Origin ==
On October 15, 2010, the chairman of the National State Television and Radio Company of Belarus, Alexander Zimovsky, announced that the Ministry of Culture of the Republic of Belarus had proposed the creation of the television contest “National Music Awards”. The awards were to be presented in the categories of “Best Song of the Year,” “Best Performer,” “Best Band,” “Opening of the Year,” and “For Contribution to the Development of Belarusian Pop Music.”

The Ministry of Culture also announced the prizes for the winners, "Best Song of the Year" would receive a cash prize of 95 basic units (Br 3,325,000; US$1,111) and a certificate for creating a music video. Both, the performer and songwriters are awarded in the nomination. In other categories with interactive voting, there were awards equalling 77 basic units (BU). The winner for "Best Belarusian-language Song of the Year" received a cash prize of 73 basic units (Br 2,555,000; $853), and other smaller prizes were also offered in other categories as well.

== 2011 Awards ==
Songs written from December 2010 to November 2011 were accepted for consideration. The expert panel of judges included 100 people and the winners were all announced on December 13, 2011.

Year	Nominee / work	Award	Result
2011	music by Ŭladzimier Kandrusievič, lyrics by Voĺha Boldyrava, singing by Alyona Lanskaya	Belarusian-language Song of the Year	Won
2011	Dmitry Koldun	Song of the Year	Won
2011	Инна Афанасьева	Best Singer - Female	Won
2011	Алексей Хлестов	Best Singer - Male	Won
2011	Троица	Best Group	Won
2011	Teo	Discovery of the Year	Won
2011	Леонид Ширин	Best Songwriter	Won
2011	Нина Богданова	Best Lyricist	Won
2011	Том первый(Анна Хитрик and band S°unduk)	Album of the Year	Won
2011	Саша Немо	Best Arrangement	Won
2011	The Sumer Amphitheatre in Vitebsk on May 4, 2011 (Yadviga Poplavskaya and Alexander Tikhanovich)	Best Concert	Won
2011	J:Морс	Best Tour	Won
2011	See You in Vegas (Litesound)	Best Music Video	Won
2011	Oleg Klimov (Sovetskaya Belorussiya – Belarus' Segodnya)	Best Journalist/Music Critic	Won
2011	Максим Олейников (band Топлес)	Best Producer	Won
2011	Vladimir Mulyavin (VIA Pesniary) (posthumously)	Contribution to the Development of Belarusian Pop Music	Won
2011	Lidiya Zablotskaya	Star of the Year (Best Young Performer)	Won
2011	Вадим Галыгин	Best Duo	Won
2011	(music by Олег Молчан, lyrics by Ирина Видова, singing by Ирина Видова)	People's Choice Award	Won
2011	Михаил Финберг	Development of the Traditional Belarusian Song	Won

== 2012 Awards ==
Year	Nominee / work	Award	Result
2012	Anatoly Yarmolenko	Belarusian-language Song of the Year	Won
2012	Лариса Грибалёва	Song of the Year	Won
2012	Саша Немо	Best Pop Group	Won
2012	Open Space	Best Rock Group	Won
2012	Apple Tea	Best Jazz Group	Won
2012	Stary Olsa	Best Ethno-folk Group	Won
2012	Герман (song: В тишине рассвета)	Best Songwriter	Won
2012	Ярослав Ракитин (song Слышишь, я иду к тебе)	Best Lyricist	Won
2012	Мне с тобою повезло(Тяни-Толкай)	Best Album	Won
2012	Yuriy Vashchuk	Best Arranger	Won
2012	beZ bileta	Concert of the Year	Won
2012	Alexander Solodukha	Best Tour	Won
2012	Лермонт	Music Video of the Year	Won
2012	Сергей Андрианов	Best Journalist/Music Critic	Won
2012	Селитра № 7(Drum Ecstasy)	Best Song for Film or Television	Won
2012	Владимир Кубышкин	Best Producer	Won
2012	Яков Науменко (posthumously)	For Contribution to the Development of Modern Music	Won
2012	Александра Локтионова	Star of the Year (Best Young Performer)	Won
2012	Юлия Жидкая	Debut of the Year	Won
2012	Alexander Solodukha and participants of the project Поющие города from Minsk	Creativity of the Year	Won
2012	Alyona Lanskaya	Hope of the Year	Won
2012	participants of the project Поющие города from Rahachow	Understudies of the Year	Won

== 2013 Awards ==
In the period from November 1 to November 21, 2013, applications were collected for the third National Musical Awards. Songs that were released between November 1, 2012, and October 31, 2013, were eligible for the awards. The award show itself took place on December 16 at the Palace of the Republic.

Year	Nominee / work	Award	Result
2013	Танчыць (ili-ili)	Belarusian-language Song of the Year	Won
2013	Падал первый снег (music by Евгений Олейник, lyrics by Юлия Быкова, singing by Инна Афанасьева)	Song of the Year	Won
2013	Alyona Lanskaya	Best Pop Group	Won
2013	beZ bileta	Best Rock Group	Won
2013	Apple Tea	Best Jazz Group	Won
2013	Харошкі	Best Ethno-folk Group	Won
2013	Леонид Ширин and Yuriy Vashchuk (song Беларусь великая)	Best Songwriter	Won
2013	Павел Бертош (Ты больше не моя, singing by Алексей Хлестов)	Best Lyricist	Won
2013	Traukamurauka (KRIWI)	Best Album	Won
2013	Святослав Позняк (song Летняя, singing by Искуи Абалян)	Best Arranger	Won
2013	Дым над водой (Президентский оркестр Республики Беларусь)	Concert of the Year	Won
2013	Что в этом сердце (Гюнеш Абасова) and Як жа край наш не любіць (Форс-Минорand Irina Dorofeeva)	Best Tour	Won
2013	Станция (У нескладоваеand Братья Грим; director Дмитрий Войтенко)	Music Video of the Year	Won
2013	Tatsyana Mushynskaya (magazine Mastatstva)	Best Journalist/Music Critic	Won
2013	Следы апостолов from the motion picture Следы апостолов (music by: Максим Алейников, Феликс Луцкий, lyrics by Елена Ярмолович, singing by Валерий Дайнеко)	Best Song for Film or Television	Won
2013	Eduard Khanok	For Contribution to the Development of Modern Music	Won
2013	Илья Волков	Star of the Year (Best Young Performer)	Won
2013	Юлия Фомкина	Debut of the Year	Won
2013	Тренд делюкс	Best Choreography	Won
2013	Илья Волков	Best Young Performer	Won

== 2014 Awards ==
On October 30, 2014, the National Music Awards was renamed to The Lira (Belarusian: Ліра). The selection process began via the website for All-National TV. The site created a list of 65 songs that were eligible for voting. Among the 65 songs in the competition, 10 were in the Belarusian language. On January 31, 2015, at the Palace of the Republic, the annual awards were presented.

Year	Nominee / work	Award	Result
2014	Абдымi мяне (Naviband)	Belarusian-language Song of the Year	Won
2014	Лариса Грибалёва	Song of the Year	Won
2014	Teo	Performer of the Year	Won
2014	Misters	Opening of the Year	Won
2014	production center Спамаш	Producer of the Year	Won
2014	Профиартвидеон(Yadviga Poplavskaya and Alexander Tikhanovich)	Best Organizer of Concerts	Won
2014	Леонид Ширин	Best Songwriter	Won
2014	Елена Ярмолович	Best Lyricist	Won
2014	IOWA	For the Popularization of Belarusian Music Abroad	Won
2014	Андрей Саврицкий	Best Arranger	Won
2014	Yadviga Poplavskaya and Alexander Tikhanovich	For Contribution to the Development of Popular Music Art	Won
2014	Легенды.Live	Best Musical Television Project in the Field of Popular Art	Won
2014	You Will Be Here (Жанет)	Music Video of the Year	Won
2014	Алексей Гросс	Style of the Year	Won
2014	Беларуськалий	Patron of the Culture of Belarus in the Field of Popular Music Art	Won

== 2016 Awards ==
On October 27, 2016, after a one-year break (there were no awards presented in 2015), the Ministry of Culture of the Republic of Belarus announced the start of selection for the Lira Awards. Songs released from January to December 2016 were accepted for consideration. The voting began on the All-National TV channel’s website with 6 nominations: “Best Song in Belarusian,” “Best Performer of the Year (Among Men),” “Best Performer of the Year (Among Women),” “Best Group,” “Best Song of the Year,” and “Best Music Video of the Year.” An expert panel selected the winners in 3 nominations, (“Best Songwriter”, “Best Lyricist”, and “Best Arranger”). The organizers of the competition determined the remaining winners with suggestions from the panel, in the remaining 3 categories, (“Opening of the Year”, “Style of the Year”, and “Ours Abroad”). On February 9, 2017, the awards were presented.

Year	Nominee / work	Award	Result
2016	Гісторыя майго жыцця (Naviband)	Belarusian-language Song of the Year	Won
2016	J:Морс	Best Group	Won
2016	Блізка (J:Морс)	Song of the Year	Won
2016	Саша Немо	Performer of the Year (Male)	Won
2016	Инна Афанасьева	Performer of the Year (Female)	Won
2016	Елена Атрашкевич	Best Songwriter	Won
2016	Олег Жуков	Best Lyricist	Won
2016	Святослав Позняк	Best Arranger	Won
2016	Адрес — планета Земля (beZ bileta, director Михаил Быченок)	Music Video of the Year	Won
2016	Dmitry Koldun	Ours Abroad	Won
2016	Радиоволна	Opening of the Year	Won
2016	Провокация	Style of the Year	Won
2016	Amkodor	Patron of Belarusian Culture	Won

== Criticism ==
At the beginning of 2013, in his column on Charter 97, Źmicier Padbiarezski of Radio Free Europe/Radio Liberty lamented that the organizers of the awards in their nominations “do not notice” quite popular, but partially censored, artists in the country, such as Siarhei Mikhalok, Lavon Volski, or Alexander Kullinkovich. At the request of BelaPAN, he also revealed the vicious practice of the massive use of playbacks at concerts, while the agency's journalists themselves found the evidences of plagiarism in some songs of the performers.

In a number of op-eds over at naviny.by, singer Irina Vidova, winner of the People's Choice Award in 2011, agreed with criticism of the implementation of the award from a number of journalists, citing her examples of the organizers' negligence too, and emphasized the need for greater transparency in voting, pluralism in the process of nominating contestants and the forming of the composition of the jury, constancy in the rules of the competition, attracting specialists from alternative TV channels and the media to its organization, nevertheless concluding the significance and importance of the project on a national scale as a whole.

In 2013, Źmicier Biezkaravajny, founder of the music portal Experty.by, noted that the award show is “a big project that is shown on television” and “in which people get money [for winning]”. The critic also questioned the quality of the jury composition after an analysis of the 2012 ceremony and claimed that, coupled with other shortcomings, all cast doubt on the awards' national status.

He also confirmed the opinion of an interviewer that economic problems had reached the national stage with the cancellation of the “directive and artificial” ceremony in 2015, “If there is an order, some designated channel conducts it. If there is no order, no one does. This is an indicator of the level of professional relationships within the pop community of Belarus, its spoiledness by state attention. Neither the professional community, as in many countries, nor an initiative group stand behind the award. The Ministry of Culture should not get involved in such projects.”

In a review of all music awards of Belarus for 2013, Pavel Sverdlov, editor of KYKY.ORG, described the second ceremony as an act that “resembled the distribution of the USSR State Prizes” but “with the difference that, no representatives of the alternative music scene slipped in [among the nominees] though.”

In 2014, Alexandr Chernuho, editor of Ultra-music.com, following the coverage of three ceremonies, sharply negatively assessed the implementation of the awarding of music awards, “Year after year we have been watching colossal flaws, mistakes, and profanations: Larisa Gribaleva, who sits in the jury, receives the award for the best song of the year, Irina Dorofeeva is confused with Iskui Abalyan, Valeriy Dayneko’s playback cuts short, and it turns out that he does not know the lyrics of the song.”
