= Split Before, Together Now =

Studio album by Hair Peace Salon and Jitters
- Released: October 25, 2007
- Recorded: 2006–2007
- Genres: Britpop, Britrock
- Length: 39:08
- Label: West Records
- Producers: Hair Peace Salon, Jitters

Hair Peace Salon chronology
Split Before, Together Now (2007)	Gentleman (2012)

Singles from Split Before, Together Now
- 1. "Pick Me Up" Released: June 1, 2006; 2. "Gipsy" Released: October 28, 2007

Split Before, Together Now is a split album by Belarusian rock bands Hair Peace Salon and Jitters released on the initiative of the West Records label on October 25, 2007. The disc consists of two EPs: Gipsy by Hair Peace Salon and Pick Me Up by Jitters.

== History ==
By the end of spring 2006, two bands of Hair Peace Salon and Jitters decided to unite on a single disc. In fall 2006 Jitters presented the single "Pick Me Up", while Hair Peace Salon was preparing a maxi-single on 5 songs, but since a full album would not work out from such a number of tracks, the friendly bands decided to put together a split album. According to Artur Luchkov, drummer of Hair Peace Salon, it had already accumulated material, which would be enough for a solo album, but the band had not “matured for an album” yet. Already in the early spring of 2007, in a conversation with BelGazeta, impresario Jan Busiel pinned “high hopes” on the next single of Hair Peace Salon.

After the attempts of Hair Peace Salon to play with session keyboardists for a few quarters, including on stage during the festival "Acoustics of Spring" in March 2007, in connection with Konstantin Karman's six-month foreign business trip, at the end of 2007 the number of official band members increased. Konstantin paused the existence of his band Jitters and was invited to play in Hair Peace Salon on a regular basis. The ex-leader of Jitters was very pleased that he played music together then. It is noticeable that the former bassist and vocalist became keyboardist and vocalist of Hair Peace Salon, because the band already had a bass player, while the artist who had been known to the guys from joint performances bought a Roland JP-8000 synthesizer during a business trip to Scotland, which served as the material basis to positively respond to the proposal of the colleagues to change his profile.

At its time, Jitters recorded and mixed its songs on a recording studio in Baranavichy for only 2 months, while Hair Peace Salon decided to record by itself, experiment, and seek its sound, so the whole recording process took a lot more time. The concert boom of Hair Peace Salon of 2007 allowed to put the finishing touches to new songs that would be included on the single “Gipsy” and then on the split. That mini-CD was released on October 28, 2007, and spread through contact with musicians.

During that time, Jitters managed to present its record, give a final concert to the audience, and scatter all over the world, but the idea of a split album not disappeared and was transformed into a conceptual CD. “The disc is a little story of two friendly bands that were previously on their own, then united,” Konstantin Karman recalled the friendship of both groups for the music portal xlam.by.

On October 25, 2007, a joint album compilation entitled “Split Before, Together Now” was released on the record label West Records to promote new cooperation. Aleh Vial, leader of Hair Peace Salon, said Aliena Skarabahatava from Tuzin.fm that the main idea of its songs was a spiritual search of the man, and answering the same question on what is its part of the CD about, Jitters’ frontman Konstantin Karman added that its tracks represented dissatisfaction with what we had then.

The bands become henceforth officially united. "We decided to temporarily freeze the Jitters project," Konstantin Karman told the republican portal of alternative music xlam.by on the eve of the presentation of the joint album. "And since we have been acquainted and on friendly terms with Hair Peace Salon for a long time, there were no obstacles for unification. We have been exchanging musicians previously. There will be two voices in HPS now."

The compilation was presented on November 18, 2007, in Minsk at the “Goodwin” club with the support of the bands Open Space, The Blackmail, and other artists, and, as Alena “Aresha” Sobolevskaya from the music portal LiveSound.by stressed, there was a beautiful concert, without superfluous people and “off-topic” music.

== Critical reception ==
"Despite the abundance of bands that play in the style of Brit-rock, this musical trend in our country has long remained in the shadows. And now a breakthrough came about," the music portal LiveSound.by embraced the release of the compilation. Through the prism of the review of the album Gentleman by Hair Peace Salon, Siarhei Budkin, music critic over at Budzma Belarusians!, expressed sadness that "the outstanding works" "Hover", "Gipsy" did not make its cut.

“Belarusians desperately jar guitars and bawl: it turns out into Brit-rock with the dizzy weaves of harmonies à la The Mars Volta, technically good guitar arpeggios à la Muse, and neurotic and sensual intonations à la Travis,” Tat’yana Zamirovskaya, journalist from the weekly BelGazeta, wrote about the Hair Peace Salon’s portion of the disc, putting up a takeaway that the band’s melodies in an incredible way resemble the Radiohead’s album of 2007 “In Rainbows,” which came out after the material of the disc had been recorded. In her review, Alena Sobolevskaya from the Muzykalnaya Gazeta shared the opinion of the colleague on the musical tune and reflected upon the hysterical vocals, depressive bright melodies, and clever minor emotions.

In her review of the album "Split Before, Together Now,” Tat’yana Zamirovskaya described the music of Jitters with the words “annoying, authentic and blues]]-like eccentric – it has a crazy dancing Gomez-like and Happy Mondays-like style, and there are no pretentious reflections.” On the pages of the Muzykalnaya Gazeta, Alena Sobolevskaya appreciated the naughtiness and dance guitar rock of Jitters and compared the music of both bands with the works of Travis, Radiohead, Muse, Blur, and Coldplay.

== CD layout ==
As Aleh Vial recalled to xlam.by, the initial idea of the cover, which reflects the concept of the disc (tied together black and white shoes), came to Konstantin Karman and Eugene Vial, the first of drummer Jitters. Musicians said Aliena Skarabahatava, journalist over at Tuzin.fm, they had a lot of cover ideas, but bound together different boots were the most interesting solution, because “we are different but interconnected with laces like those boots.” Band members were looking for shoes that would suit for shooting, carrying away by the sight of Minskers’ plimsolls, and then went to the section of children's shoes and realized that this is what was needed. It turned out that no photographing was allowed in outlets, so they had to rent a pair of the children's ones in a secondhand store in Zhdanovichi. As Alena Sobolevskaya from the Muzykalnaya Gazeta evaluated the choice of cover, this design fitted the bands well, since they preserved funny spontaneity and inner kindness. “The result was such a nice cover here, which is very pleasant to all,” Aleh Vial summarized a result for the Belarusian Students’ Association.

== Awards and nominations. Commercial success ==
The first song of the collection “Hover” became the anthem of Hair Peace Salon, which allowed to pass the qualifying rounds and take the first prize (recording in a professional music studio) of the «Russian: ИдиНаРок» contest in 2007. With the program basically made up of songs from the split album, musicians participated in other music competitions, such as the “Musical Playoffs” (semi-finalists), the “Rock Sparring” (the prize of studio recording owners), the “Golden Acoustics” (the winners). “We are very pleased that listeners chose us as the winners of this competition,” Aleh Vial, Hair Peace Salon’s frontman, remembered the peripeteia of the competition for Tuzin.fm and revealed the idea further, “The Acoustics had success among the audience. But we are not satisfied in this regard. Of course, it is nice to win, but, personally, I am ready for anything.”

Owing to the album and concert-competitive activities on the basis of the songs from it, the band Hair Peace Salon was nominated in the category of “Breakthrough of the Year” at the “Rock Coronation 2007” ceremony in February 2008. According to Charter 97, the CD was put in the list of top 50 discs as to sales for its year. In general, audio materials were included in radio rotation, boosted the presence of rockers in the information space. Weighing in on the expansion of the company’s catalogue with the released disc at the end of 2007, Siarhiej Jasiučenia, director of West Records, noted that his label was trying to “keep an eye on musical trends.”

== Track listing ==
No.	Title	Writer(s)	Artist	Length
1.	"Hover"	Hair Peace Salon	Hair Peace Salon	3:55
2.	"Through The Dark"	Hair Peace Salon	Hair Peace Salon	4:30
3.	"Gipsy"	Hair Peace Salon	Hair Peace Salon	4:45
4.	"Enemy"	Hair Peace Salon	Hair Peace Salon	4:45
5.	"At Your Side"	Hair Peace Salon	Hair Peace Salon	2:29
6.	"Pick-Me-Up"	Jitters	Jitters	3:47
7.	"Staggering"	Jitters	Jitters	4:23
8.	"Sapphire"	Jitters	Jitters	4:13
9.	"Dint"	Jitters	Jitters	3:06
10.	"Pixies"	Jitters	Jitters	3:15

== Personnel ==
Hair Peace Salon:

- Aleh Vial — lead vocals, guitars.
- Konstantin Karman — back vocals, synthesizer.
- Maxim “Gandibober” Devichensky — bass.
- Artur Luchkov — drums.

Jitters:

- Konstantin Karman — lead vocals, bass.
- Ivan Barzenka — guitars, back vocals, keyboards.
- Syargey Kondratenka — guitars.
- Pavel Kudrin — drums.

Guest musicians:

- Ivan Barzenka — keyboards (1, 2).
- Olga Malko — keyboards (3, 5).
- Andrey Kozik — keyboards (4).

Production:

- Valentin Borisevich, studio «HWNL» — mixing and mastering (1, 2, 3, 4, 5).
- Vyacheslav Bankevich — recording and mixing (6, 7, 8, 9, 10).
- Slap — cover design.

== Music videos ==
During the filming of the show “Musical Playoffs” in fall 2007, impressed by the performance of the band director Anatoĺ Viečar made an offer of creative cooperation to the members of Hair Peace Salon. Already in early 2008, the band's frontman Aleh Vial told Tuzin.fm on the plans to shoot a music video, “We are now convinced that we need it. In February, we will begin work and take something from the new for video-embodiment.” The official video for the eponymous lead single “Hover,” which presented the new look of the band that was together with Konstantin Karman then, was shot in February 2008 and aired on TV in the program of the LAD channel “Pro движение+” before long. In the analysis of the Silent Hill-esque music video, X from “LiveSound.by” noted an interesting directorial and cameraman work, but also pointed out shortcomings in acting.

== Cover versions ==
For the compilation of Budzma Belarusians! and European Radio for Belarus “Budzma The Best Rock / Budzma The Best Rock/New,” in 2009 the band Hair Peace Salon covered the song “Gipsy,” which was already dedicated to the Ursari, in the Belarusian language as “Belarusian: Ciańki.” Aleh Vial, leader of Hair Peace Salon, once told Aliena Skarabahatava from Tuzin.fm that the English word “Gipsy” means the Romani people and the song describes the state of roving on life in a spiritual sense too.

Belarusian man of letters Vital Voranau acted as the author of the literary translation of the lyrics; “This is a three years old composition and we are no longer satisfied with some fragments of the text. When translating, Vital wrote the text anew,” musicians drew attention to the joint-work. “The Belarusization of non-Belarusian lyrics by Belarusian bands is a great advanced training school,” the poet explained his approach to work and added that the results of Belarusization allow musicians to more gracefully integrate into the domestic context.

As a result, expert of Tuzin.fm Ihar Nazaranka highlighted that to listen to the song in Belarusian suits him more. He was also echoed by Siarhei Budkin, expert staffer over at Experty.by, who in 2012 warmly remembered “quite successful experiments of musicians with the Belarusian language” on the example of the same song. “Vital made a very successful interpretation of the original text,” Konstantin Karman, singer-keyboardist on the song, said and added, “Now there is a feeling that the „understandable“ lyrics is more thoroughly conveys the true atmosphere of the song.” Another music critic over at Tuzin.fm Sieviaryn Kviatkoŭski put into words that “Ciańki” reminded him the works of Polish rock band Czerwone Gitary and Paul McCartney touched up in the contemporary Britpop style.

The song “Ciańki” was charted in the charts of Tuzin.fm, but stopped in the pre-final part of the “Megatour-2010.”
