= Deal with Silence =

Studio album by Open Space
- Released: December 21, 2009
- Recorded: 2009
- Studio: Granny Records
- Genre: Rock, Britpop
- Length: 38:31
- Label: West Records

Open Space chronology
| Deal with Silence (2009) | Pressure (2012) |

Professional ratings
Review scores
| Source | Rating |
|---|---|
| BelGazeta | 5.0/10 stars |
| Experty.by | 6.0/10 stars |
| Rolling Stone Russia | 3.0/5 stars |
| music.com.ua | 5.0/10 stars |
| Sovetskaya Belorussiya – Belarus' Segodnya | 6.0/10 stars |

Deal with Silence is the debut album of the Belarusian rock band Open Space recorded at «Granny Records» (Minsk, Belarus). All songs were written in English. Released in retail on December 21, 2009, it became available as a free download from the band's website on March 12, 2010.

== Track listing ==
All tracks are written by Vitaliy Matievskiy

| No. | Title | Length |
|---|---|---|
| 1. | "Deal with Silence" | 4:33 |
| 2. | "Unprepared" | 3:12 |
| 3. | "TV Show" | 3:07 |
| 4. | "Hurricane" | 3:16 |
| 5. | "You Will Never Know" | 4:12 |
| 6. | "Stalemate" | 2:43 |
| 7. | "Get Away" | 3:19 |
| 8. | "Busy" | 3:48 |
| 9. | "Travel Song" | 3:31 |
| 10. | "Beautiful" | 3:01 |
| 11. | "Same Excuses" | 3:49 |

== Critical reception ==
Daria Kozlova of "Переходный возраст" wrote in a note on the occasion of the release of the album that the disc "turned out to be honed and professional."

Syargey Pukst, music reviewer over at Sovetskaya Belorussiya – Belarus' Segodnya, in his review wrote that "the songs on the disc were combined into a high-quality product with the relative diversity in the narrow confines of the chosen style," but "music turns to be predictable." Alexandr Filimonov and Petr Bolagav, editors of the Lenta.ru portal, appreciated the professionalism of the record that came about with sort of predictable songs, and attributed it to the mix of the indie-rock, pop-rock, and soft-rock genres. Hagnir of nneformat.ru heard "the most excellent pop indie rock" in the spirit of the Australian bands of the 1980s and the Scottish Simple Minds on the disc, not without dissatisfaction that they "sing in English," having paid a compliment to the "glorious band" for melodiousness.

Masha Kalesnikava, music columnist over at European Radio for Belarus, highlighted in her analysis that the album was produced "too flat, without emotional intensity and splashes," although its technical side perceives well enough. Music critic of Rolling Stone Russia Andrey Bukharin came to the conclusion on the pages of the magazine that the band plays melodious English-language rock filled with confidence energetic, and this feature turns some of the songs on the CD into stadium anthems.

Journalist of the weekly BelGazeta Tatyana Zamirovskaya as a freelance music expert over at Experty.by assessed the album, saying it "leaves the impression of solid, expensive, and high-quality work on the material, which may do not deserve it," rating it at 5.0/10 and recognized hymns à la U2, Stereophonics over there. Staff critics over at the music portal Experty.by rated the record at the grade of 6.0/10: in elegant and tasteful arrangements, Siarhei Budkin heard the melodies of Muse and praised the design of the CD as well, "unpretentious tunes," according to Zmicer Bezkaravayny, refer to Brit-pop and Coldplay, Aleh Klimay would want to hear something more melodic than homogeneous Britpop by Open Space, while Zmicer Padbyarezski was quite disappointed by this comparatively monotonous Britpop album.

Author of the Ultra-Music music portal Vyacheslav Radionov witnessed the musicians' commitment to the Britpop wave, because the music reminded him of Coldplay, Travis, Starsailor, and Wilki, and also outlined the licked into shape sound of this well-produced and beautifully recorded album. Joy Tartaglia from the Ukrainian music portal music.com.ua stressed that a Travis-esque quality is exaggerated, because the band's sound, which is "a retelling of the elementary stories of British rock," is more akin to the Esthetic Education one, called attention to lead vocals à la Joakim Berg from Kent, while rated the CD at 5.0/10.

== Personnel ==
Open Space:

- Vitaliy Matievskiy – vocals, guitars, piano.
- Maxim Mestovskiy – guitars.
- Seva Maslov – bass.
- Andrey Malashenko – drums, percussion.

Guest musicians:

- Alena Holadava – cello (5).

Production:

- Anatoliy Shmanay – recording and mixing engineer.
- Jerom Shmit, «Air Mastering» studio – mastering.
- Anatoliy Misnikov – cover photo.
- Tatiana Ryneiskaya — model on the cover photo.
- Zmicer Baravy Design-studio – CD design.
