= Gentleman (Hair Peace Salon album) =

Studio album by Hair Peace Salon
- Released: March 21, 2012
- Recorded: 2009–2012
- Genres: Power-pop, indie-rock, Britpop
- Length: 41:11

Hair Peace Salon chronology
Split Before, Together Now (2007)	Gentleman (2012)

Singles from Gentleman
- 1. "Happy for a While" Released: April 5, 2010; 2. "Rolz'n'Rulz" Released: September 15, 2010

Professional ratings
Review scores
Source	Rating
Budzma Belarusians!	9.0/10 stars
Experty.by (1st review)	9.0/10 stars
Experty.by (2nd review)	7.0/10 stars
Experty.by (3rd review)	7.0/10 stars
Experty.by (4th review)	6.0/10 stars
European Radio for Belarus	9.0/10 stars
nneformat.ru	5.0/5 stars

Gentleman is the first studio album by the Belarusian indie rock and power-pop band Hair Peace Salon, released on March 21, 2012. The CD contains 10 tracks recorded in the period 2009–2012. All songs were written by Aleh Vial and Konstantin Karman.

== History ==
=== Beginning of work. Happy for a While ===
In late 2009, during the video presentation of “In Tune“ on Experty.by, it was announced that the band began work on a new album after perturbations in the line-up. In the spring of 2010 in an interview to the Chinese magazine Chinese: 我爱摇滚乐, members of the band explained their approach to the thorough work, “Until recently, we just have not considered that it is necessary to record a full-length album, but now we are working hard in this direction.”

The first single from the upcoming album entitled “Happy for a While“ was released in the Chinese market first with a special cover for the region on April 5, 2010. In the homeland, the band decided to coincide the release of its new one with the Day of Cosmonautics, because, as musicians explained the choice of the date for Tuzin.fm, “the age-old human desire for the new, for the conquest of uncharted spaces exactly combines our new songs.” “The purpose of such trips is a long-awaited moment of happiness, after which we are going to move forward again to manage to catch more, yet there is less time left...” Ultra-Music wrote about it.

The single combined two new songs “Happy for a While” and “Out of Time,” and it could be downloaded from the site of the band for free. The release marked the shift of the band from British rock melancholia towards power-pop, and, as singer-keyboardist Konstantin Karman announced via Experty.by in the spring, the entire album was going to be released the following fall. While working on new tracks, drummer Vladimir Agayan supposed that there were going to be invited and involved guest musicians, because the four of us “are not always able to implement all the ideas.”

Songs from the singles, as well as the changed dress code of musicians, were presented on April, 10, at the “Broadway” club during the premiere show with the support of “Drum Ecstasy,” “Кассиопея,” “The Stampletons,” and other artists. Ultra-Music’s correspondent Andrej Piatakoŭ witnessed a new look of the band, called “the pajama quartet,” as well as was one of the first ones who heard a fresh remix that would be put on the thematic EP in the fall. A fresh style and more frisky new songs were presented to the general public in June, as the guys performed at the musical show of Capital TV “Celebrity Ring.”

=== Rolz’n’Rulz and HPS Remixed ===
The second single from the album “Rolz’n’Rulz,” which is themed around natural and contrived conventions that restrict or give people rights, was released on September 15, 2010. Experty.by’s reviewer Anton Sierankoŭ heard more rock and roll motifs than the power-pop ones in the single and concluded, “This is a very peppy, contagiously joyful song, with a clear melody and energetic guitars, made as simple as much with sincere enthusiasm.” Ej.by’s critic Źmicier Padbiarezski, who came to the conclusion that Hair Peace Salon had very rethought the concept of rock and roll in the single, wrote, “„Rolz’n’Rulz“ is one of those songs, in which the band with such a complicated name quite convincingly demonstrates its ability to clearly organize musical material, and almost in the first place, vocals and present that properly.”

The release of the single was supported by the experimental EP “HPS Remixed,” which got 6 songs from the last two singles in trance, drum and bass, downtempo and other styles by a number of Minsk electronic scene DJs, who were involved in work as a result of a loss in the Bonobo contest. As musicians recalled to Kyky.org, listeners had studied the band page over at Last.fm, found scrobbled (Note: recommended; from the title of Last.fm's recommendation system “Audioscrobbler.”) tags, and begun to write letters and ask about remixes. “I relished Hair Peace Salon’s guitars, so I went to experiment with broken rhythms. The result was a dynamic remix, which is very different in concept from the original,” DJ Rog, author of one of the remixes, said. “Cooperation proved to be interesting,” Aleh Vial, leader of the band, said Tuzin.fm. “The figurative vision of these people turned out to be very close to ours.”

HPS Remixed
No.	Title	Writer(s)	Length
1.	"Rolz'n'Rulz (GRAF Trance Mix)"	DJ GRAF	6:39
2.	"Happy For A While (GRAF Breakbeat Mix)"	DJ GRAF	4:07
3.	"Happy For A While (DJ ROG Drum'n'Bass Mix)"	DJ ROG	4:54
4.	"Happy For A While (WORLD GOVERNMENT Time Mix)"	DJ WORLD GOVERNMENT	5:42
5.	"Out Of Time (GRAF Downtempo Mix)"	DJ GRAF	3:49
6.	"Happy For A While (WORLD GOVERNMENT Continuum Mix)"	DJ WORLD GOVERNMENT	7:02

Viktar Siamashka, host of the podcast “Krakatuk” on Radyjo Racyja, in his program expressed an opinion that the DJ versions turned out to be better than the originals.

In a press release in support of the single and the EP, the band noted to Experty.by that the work on the forthcoming debut album would be finished before winter 2010. The guys stuck in the studio without going outside in order to record an album. As members recognized on December 3, 2010, during an online-concert at the biggest Belarusian web portal TUT.BY, where they performed, among others, some songs from the past singles, important work on the digitalization of compositions in the recording studio forced them to heavily reduce the number of live performances.

During the online-broadcast, it was announced that 11 songs were planned to be included on a CD and the themes of the highborn, generosity, fortitude, desire for life with a bit of self-irony and oddities had to go through it like a common thread. The updated schedule of recording material for a disc over by the fall of 2011 was declared too, under which the work was being done for a year.

=== Album release and tour ===
On March 18, 2012, the band made the official announcement of its full-length album in a short animated video. Musical works for the past three years were combined into the album “Gentleman,” and this release began to be available on the official website of the band starting March 21, 2012, with a pay what you want option for fans. In a comment for Tuzin.fm on the album’s release day, vocalist Konstantin Karman indicated, “There are no song-fillers on the disc. The album turned out to be diverse, but it has an overall mood and is not protracted.”

Despite the pre-announcement, only 10 tracks made the final cut. The band’s leader Aleh Vial explained this decision in a comment for Experty.by, “Initially, 11 songs were planned to be put on the album, after completing the recording and trying to create a harmonious track listing, it proved that one of them did not fit the general outline at all – it had to be removed.”

The first concert in support of the album was held at the “Чердачок” club in Vitebsk on March, 31. The leaving of permanent drummer Vladimir Agayan much spoiled further touring plans. The musicians who left even played one of the rare gigs as the three of us. In these circumstances, a big show in support of the release was postponed until October 11, 2012. On this day the band made a presentation of its album “Gentleman” at one of the most popular Minsk concert halls the “RE:PUBLIC” club. During the solo gig, musicians performed songs from the album, some of the old hits, sung a duo and a couple of cover versions of its songs in the Belarusian language, as well as officially presented its new drummer Alex Stepanovich to the public. Critics appreciated the great fall concert, which went home, without a special flair, “at the grade of B,” while Irena Katvitskaya, artistic director of the folk bands “Akana-NHS,” “Kazalpin,” and others, highlighted via Budzma Belarusians! the elegance, finesse, and purity of the program performed by the gentlemen.

More additional concerts were given in support of the new album’s material during the next half of the year. A semi-acoustic version of the program “Gentleman” was specially prepared by musicians for Babruysk. “We have done an acoustic program exclusively for concerts, the audience,” guitarist Aleh Vial explained for the European Radio for Belarus and added for Ultra-Music. “And yes, we ourselves are interested to play tracks that became a little boring performed electronically in a different way.” Minskers were able to listen to the album “Gentleman” acoustically later on. Between these, there were given solo rock concerts. The Clover Club band became a partner on the concert in March 2013.

In the same month, the band played at the annual festival “Acoustic of Spring” for the third time. As musicians said, they were faced with necessity “to reach to small towns as compact as possible,” so they reworked their songs. In April 2013 Hair Peace Salon became the headliner at the presentation of the compilation album of local bands «Belarusian: ССК-2» in Slutsk. The May concert in Kyiv concluded the album’s tour.

== CD design ==
According to critics Maryja Kalieśnikava from the European Radio for Belarus and Źmicier Padbiarezski from ej.by and Experty.by, album art deserves individual lines. Together with the completion of work on the musical side of the disk at the end of 2011, the band started to look for a “real artist,” which would draw a cover. Thus, the front cover and the booklet of the CD were adorned by the drawings of Sergei Balenok, an artist from Belarus. Musicians of Hair Peace Salon were amazed at his etchings that they found in an art gallery. With the consent of the etcher, few works were bought and used for the design of the cover and other CD booklet pages, as well as for an animated video for the announcement of the album.

== Reception ==
The album received mostly positive criticism. Tuzin.fm described the CD as follows “10 good-quality tracks. Nothing more. „Gentleman“ is from a number of those albums of this year, which we can certainly be proud of.” In the review of the European Radio for Belarus, the record was called “good, thorough, well thought out, and beautiful work. Well, separate respect for the design.” According to the columnist of the Budzma Belarusians! site Siarhei Budkin, “they have got everything you need: great voices, quite good lyrics, keen sound, flawless execution, competent pitching.” Źmicier Padbiarezski, one of the expert staffers of the Experty.by portal, noticed that “this band is just almost closer to the standard European tradition of combining rock instrumentation with enough pop melodics than all.” His colleague Aleh Klimay, who noted that “Rolz'n'Rulz rulez,” liked greater energy and aggressiveness, as well as melodiousness. Another reviewer over at Experty.by Źmicier Biezkaravajny praised “melodic and melancholic songs, beautiful guitars, and Aleh Vial’s recognizable high vocals” on the album. Maryja Kalieśnikava, freelance writer for the Experty.by project, called the album “a spring which does not hurt but caress during extension” and focused attention on “polyphony, which sometimes compels to recall the Fab Four, gives airiness and a feeling of a large stroke to the sound,” and Siarhei Budkin considered that “it is nice to hear a solid, cherished album, where not one or two specific songs but all of the songs at once are set out.” Nasha Niva's Juraś Uskoŭ summed up the assessment of domestic experts, “We have been waiting for the debut album by Hair Peace Salon for a few years, the result did not disappoint: there is great Brit-rock, whose studio exemplification proved to be no worse than the concert one.” Russian journalist Aliaksandr Filimonaŭ gave a positive assessment of the CD, “I am into all kinds of British and guitars with melancholy vocals and minor melodies, therefore I could not pass it by.”

At the same time, reviewers noted the lack of brightness and originality, because the record was heard as a regular British wave album. In the opinion of ej.by and Experty.by columnist Źmicier Padbiarezski, music from the album looks absurd against the cover based on the works of Sergei Balenok, who is “an original, paradoxical artist indeed.” The owner of the Experty.by music portal Źmicier Biezkaravajny in his review wrote, “The result proved to be a good quality album, which sounds too predictable.” Journalists rebuked for the kind of messy sound, so it is practically impossible to recognize the majority of the lyrics by ear, and some understatement in the songs.

== Awards and prizes ==
In the review of the 2012 year by Tuzin.fm, the album was marked as “a very nice work, where individuality is felt.” Earlier on, the disc was already mentioned in the website’s article “Top 5 Belarusian music of this spring.” The CD shared places from sixth to ninth in the ranking of the ten best albums released in the first half of 2012, according to the Experty.by portal, was mentioned in the personal tops by Aliaksandr Filimonaŭ, editor over at Lenta.ru, Siarhei Budkin, editor over at Tuzin.fm, Maryja Kalieśnikava, editor over at the European Radio for Belarus, Aleh Klimay as a columnist for Sovetskaya Belorussiya – Belarus' Segodnya wrote about the disc in the article about the most worthy domestic albums for the first seven months of 2012 for adding to personal music libraries. The first track of the album “Borderline” was selected by the Lenta.ru portal in the top of the best modern Belarusian songs. Also for the album, the band got a nomination in the category of “Debut of the Year” at the first professional musical awards of Belarus in the field of rock, indie, and alternative music “Rock Profi.”

== Track listing ==
No.	Title	Lyrics	Music	Length
1.	"Borderline"	Aleh Vial, Konstantin Karman	Aleh Vial	4:09
2.	"Gentleman"	Konstantin Karman	Konstantin Karman	4:47
3.	"Face to Face"	Konstantin Karman	Konstantin Karman	3:57
4.	"Happy for a While"	Aleh Vial	Aleh Vial	4:06
5.	"Out of Time"	Aleh Vial	Aleh Vial	3:17
6.	"Rolz’n’Rulz"	Aleh Vial, Konstantin Karman	Aleh Vial	3:55
7.	"Criminal"	Aleh Vial	Aleh Vial	3:36
8.	"Dotted"	Konstantin Karman	Konstantin Karman	4:29
9.	"Someone Better"	Aleh Vial	Aleh Vial	4:28
10.	"Stand the Love"	Konstantin Karman	Konstantin Karman	4:27

== Personnel ==
Hair Peace Salon:

- Aleh Vial – vocals, backing vocals, guitars.
- Konstantin Karman — vocals, backing vocals, keyboards.
- Maxim Devichensky – bass.
- Vladimir Agayan – drums (1, 2, 3, 7, 8, 10).
- Alexey Kuznetsov – drums (4, 5, 6).

Production:

- Evgeniy “Yellow Kid” Sukhavey – mixing (1, 2, 6, 7, 8, 9, 10).
- Pavel Sinilo — mixing (3, 5).
- Anatoliy Shmanay — mixing (4).
- Pavel Sinilo, the “Everest” studio – mastering.
- Slap — cover design with the use of etchings by Sergei Balenok.
- Sergei Balenok — cover art.
- Maxim "Krukoff" Lushchyk – cover animation.

== Cover versions ==
- The indie-rock band Bristeil composed a cover version of “Out of Time”, with the help of the Belarusian language, revitalized its sound, and released the work entitled “Pa-za Časam” on its EP “Cyruĺnia Svietu” in 2014.
- Also for his new band Bristeil, Aleh Vial made a literary translation of the “Gentleman” song, a Belarusian variant is called “Belarusian: Вольны, romanized: Vol'ny, lit. 'The Free One') but it has so far never been performed, Iĺlia Malinoŭski, music editor over at the European Radio for Belarus, revealed the secret in 2014.
