= Pressure (Open Space album) =

Studio album by Open Space
- Released: March 12, 2012
- Recorded: 2010–2012
- Studio: Sunflowers, fOrZ, Granny Records
- Genre: Britrock, pop rock, indie rock, psychedelic rock, Britpop, post-punk
- Length: 41:13
- Label: Vigma
- Producer: Dmitry Ivaney, Open Space, Dzianis Varancoŭ

Open Space chronology
Deal With Silence (2009)	Pressure (2012)

Singles from Pressure
- 1. "Bookseller" Released: August 8, 2011; 2. "Do You Remember" Released: April 20, 2012

Pressure is the second album of the Belarusian rock band Open Space recorded at the Minsk studios "Sunflowers," "fOrZ," and "Granny Records."

== Critical reception ==
Professional ratings
Review scores
Source	Rating
Budzma Belarusians!	7.6/10 stars
Experty.by	7.25/10 stars
Rolling Stone Russia	4.0/5 stars

Author of the Ultra-Music music portal Alieh Labunski witnessed musicians’ commitment to the indie rock flow, the course taken with the release of the previous album Deal With Silence, and got a notion that "almost all of the songs go abreast, each one is not worse but not better than another," while Bryan Adams and New Order possible inspired the band members during the recording.

The staff critics of the music portal Experty.by appointed to the work an average rating of 7.25/10: Siarhei Budkin highlighted "underlined Englishness" of the British rock performed by the guys, whose works reminded him The Cranbirries, "work on the errors" of Deal With Silence, according to Zmicer Bezkaravayny, was done, and the quality of melodic Britpop songs rose to yet another level, including thanks to the efforts of guest producer Dmitry Ivaney, known for his work with the DDT and Okean Elzy bands, Aleh Klimay's review allowed to equate the pop-rock of the musicians of the British wave, who grew up, with the works of a-ha, The Rolling Stones, U2, and Depeche Mode, and Zmicer Padbyarezski echoed his words ("the musicians have clearly brought up not so much to the overall level, as just grown up").

The latter one as a music editor over at ej.by unfolded the essence of the CD and concluded that it has mainstream songs that would have been possible to air in abundance, and separately praised the "potential schlager" "I Have A Dream." He drew attention to the fact that, with this album, Open Space may well compete with their English-speaking Western colleagues on the waves of "spoiled by the state regulation" Belarusian radio stations.

In his 4-star CD review, music critic of Rolling Stone Russia Andrey Bukharin concluded that the style of songs on the album is between Post-punk and Britpop, criticized "averaging" but also noted "the European quality" of the disc with works that will be liked by the fans of the U2, Radiohead, Placebo or Black Rebel Motorcycle Club bands.

In its review article, the music portal Tuzin.fm called the album a "perfect counterfeit" and comprehended the existence of a significant association of the compositions with the United Kingdom and its Indie rock heritage. Aleh Klimay as a columnist for Sovetskaya Belorussiya – Belarus' Segodnya, highlighting domestic albums for the first seven months of 2012 that are worthy of adding to the personal music libraries of readers, among the songs on the disc, also found "many references to the British wave" produced in the styles of pop rock and rock. European Radio for Belarus described the album as "easy to understand" and paid respect to sound producer Dmitry Ivaney for the "much stronger, refined, grown-up" quality of sound in its overview too.

The second album, which turned out to be better than the previous one, according to Hagnir of nneformat.ru, because "almost every song out of eleven can claim to be a hit," strengthened the reputation of "an almost standard Brit-pop band." In his review article, Mikita Broŭka from the weekly Novy Chas criticized the band for making the version of the song "Let It Go" rewritten in the Kyiv studio of Dmitry Ivaney more primitive in comparison with the one from the eponymous EP and assessed that the album was more even in sound than the first one while the musicians drew a line under their past English-language creativity with it. Nasha Niva’s Juraś Uskoŭ summed up the assessment of domestic experts, "Pop band Open Space continues to improve. The second album sounds more serious than the debut album. Almost all the songs can be aired on radio – and that, in this case, is a compliment."

The album was selected in several tops of CDs released in its span, including ones by the version of Experty.by, personal music critics Aleh Klimay and Zmicer Padbyarezski (all of them for the first half of 2012), as well as Julija Kalamijec's one (top 10 Belarusian albums of 2012).

== Track listing ==
No.	Title	Lyrics	Music	Length
1.	"Bookseller"	Open Space	Open Space	4:00
2.	"Need"	Open Space	Open Space	3:04
3.	"My Favourite Toy"	Open Space	Open Space	3:13
4.	"Black Heart Queen"	Open Space	Open Space	3:56
5.	"Do You Remember"	Juryj Maslov	Open Space	3:28
6.	"I Want You To Know"	Open Space	Open Space	3:53
7.	"Sally"	Open Space	Open Space	4:17
8.	"Let It Go"	Open Space	Open Space	3:45
9.	"Under Pressure"	Open Space	Open Space	2:52
10.	"Yeah Yeah Yeah (Going Inside)"	Open Space	Open Space	3:29
11.	"I Have A Dream"	Open Space	Open Space	5:16

== Personnel ==
Open Space:

- Vitaliy Matievskiy – vocals, guitars.
- Maxim Mestovskiy – guitars.
- Seva Maslov – bass.
- Andrey Malashenko – drums, percussion.

Production:

- Dmitry Ivaney – mixing and mastering, sound production, arrangements.
- Dzianis Varancoŭ – sound production, arrangements.
- Open Space – sound production, arrangements.
- Paviel Traciak – arrangements.
- Piotr Siemianiuk – arrangements.
- Vasiĺ Sierbin – vocal recording engineer.
- Maxim Mestovskiy – CD cover design.

== Cover versions ==
In 2014 the band Sunny Days sang the cover "Heta Niaprosta" of the song "Do You Remember."
