= Rolz'n'Rulz =

Single by Hair Peace Salon

from the album Gentleman
- Released: September 15, 2010
- Studio: GRANNY REC Studio
- Genre: Power pop, rock and roll
- Length: 3:54
- Composer(s): Aleh Vial
- Lyricist(s): Aleh Vial, Konstantin Karman

Hair Peace Salon singles chronology
"Happy for a While" (2010)	"Rolz'n'Rulz" (2010)	"Garela Sasna" (2012)

"Rolz'n'Rulz" is the second single from the album Gentleman by the Belarusian indie rock and power pop band Hair Peace Salon released on September 15, 2010. It consists of one song “Rolz'n'Rulz” written by Aleh Vial together with Konstantin Karman.

== History ==
The single “Rolz'n'Rulz” was brought into free access on September 15, 2010, the same day as the remix EP “HPS Remixed” was released.

Musicians from Hair Peace Salon decided to complement the Universal Declaration of Human Rights. Together with the rights to life, liberty, and security, the indie rockers propose to introduce an article: “Everyone has the right to completely freely download a new song and a remix album by Hair Peace Salon to enjoy listening”,

the music portal Tuzin.fm urged its readers to download the new single with such words.

The eponymous song from the single “Rolz'n'Rulz,” where established rules, moral, and assigned public roles are reflected, was written in a collage manner that is distinctive to the early period of the band. The second single from the album itself half-opened its secret further and showed a shift towards richer instrumental and vocal parts in songs.

“Hearing process should not be easy, the song is going to slightly open gradually, more and more, with every appearance in the player,” members of the band Hair Peace Salon described their work for Experty.by.

== Critical reception ==
Anton Sierankoŭ, reviewer over at Experty.by, heard more rock and roll motifs than the power pop ones in the single and wrote in his review piece, “This is a very peppy, contagiously joyful song, with a clear melody and energetic guitars, made as simple as much with sincere enthusiasm. The coolest thing here, of course, is how the vocal parts are organized: formally, the lead vocalist is simply sung along, but it looks as if the musicians so burst with a desire to sing at least something that they push each other from the microphone away all the time.”

According to critic Źmicier Padbiarezski from ej.by, who came to the conclusion that the band had very rethought the concept of rock 'n' roll in the single, “Rolz'n'Rulz” is “one of those songs, in which the band with such a complicated name quite convincingly demonstrates its ability to clearly organize musical material, and almost in the first place, vocals and present that properly.”

In 2012 as part of the album Gentleman, the song “Rolz'n'Rulz” was noticed for the second time, received a good press: “Rolz'n'Rulz rulez” (Alieh Klimaŭ, Experty.by), “wonderful Rolz'n'Rulz” (Siarhei Budkin, Experty.by, Budzma Belarusians!, Tuzin.fm), and, according to Źmicier Padbiarezski from the site Experty.by, became a proof of the diverse repertoire of the album. Tacciana Bobier and Alina Šymanskaja from the music portal “Pamiarkoŭny huk” characterized the song performed live with the adjective “driven.”

== Tracklisting ==
No.	Title	Lyrics	Music	Length
1.	"Rolz’n'Rulz"	Aleh Vial, Konstantin Karman	Aleh Vial	3:54

== Personnel ==
Hair Peace Salon:

- Aleh Vial – vocals, guitars.
- Konstantin Karman — vocals, synthesizer.
- Maxim Devichensky – bass, backing vocals, artistic whistle.
- Alexey Kuznetsov – drums.

Production:

- Jaŭhien “Yellow Kid” Suchaviej — mixing.
- Pavel Sinilo, “Everest” studio – mastering.
- Slap — cover design

== Awards and prizes ==
With the track “Rolz'n'Rulz”, in May 2011 the band won the grand prize (a recording session in the studio “RecPublica Studios”) in the competition held by the Polish music portal “Fabryka Zespołów”.

== The presence in compilations ==
The track “Rolz'n'Rulz” was selected to the proprietary compilation of Belarusian English-speaking bands “„APS Sound“ Volume 1” for truck drivers published by “APS” at the end of 2012.

== Remixes ==
In 2010 DJ GRAF of the Minsk electronic project “Vacuum Government” created a trance version of the song called “Rolz'n'Rulz (GRAF Trance Mix)” with a duration of 6 mins 39 seconds, which one, along with other remixes, was put on the EP “HPS Remixed” the same year. “Cooperation has turned to be interesting,” Aleh Vial, co-author of the original song, summed up the remix for Tuzin.fm, “The figurative vision of these people proved to be very close to ours.” “We are very pleased to work with musical material of Hair Peace Salon and have decided to include remixes of the songs „Rolz’n'Rulz,“ „Happy for a While“ in our live performances,” the DJs told the portal Ultra-Music following the results of participation in the Polish festival “Pakrava. Dni kultury niezależnej Białorusi.”
