= Jitters (band) =

Belarusian rock band

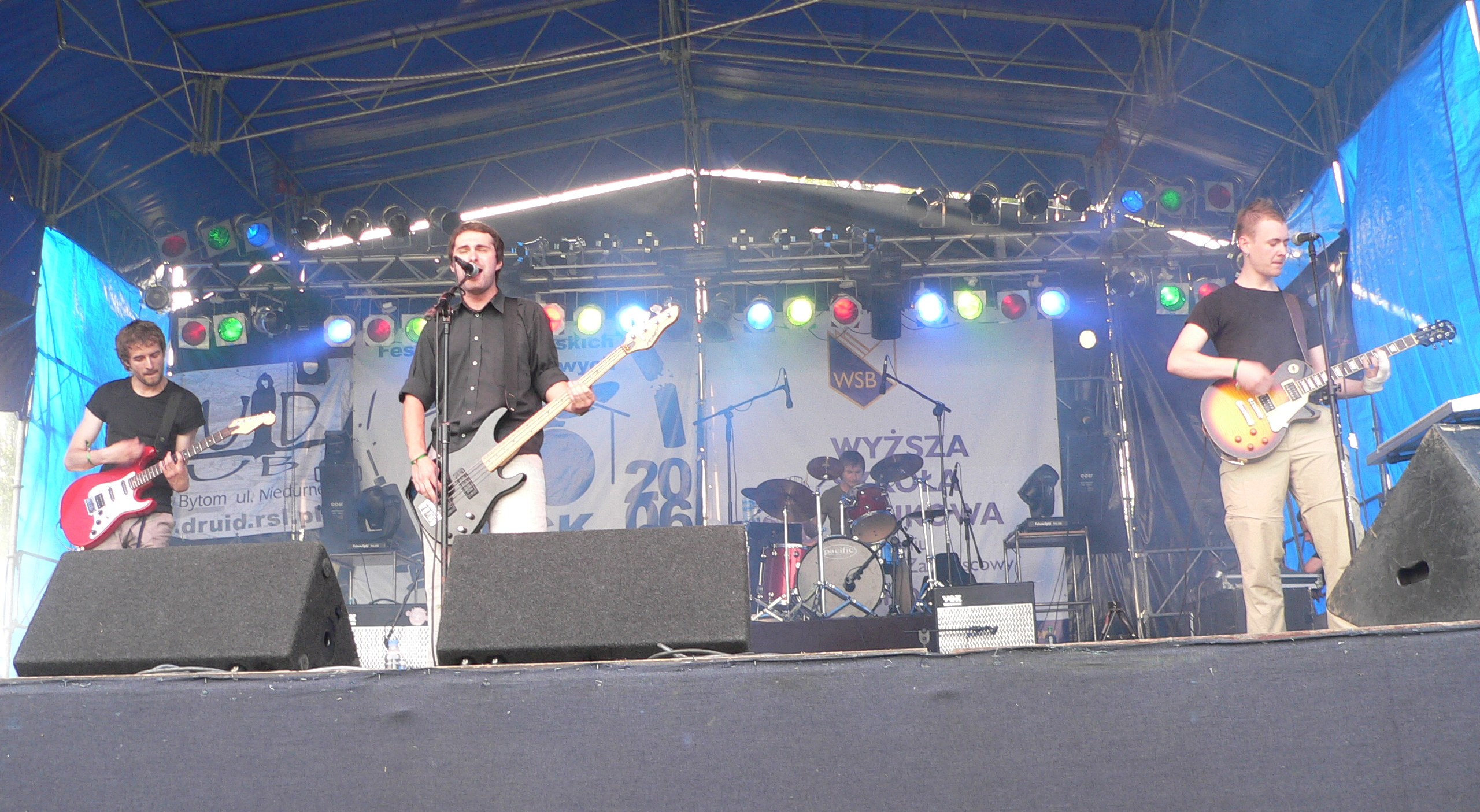
- Jitters performing in 2006. L–R: Syargey Kondratenka, Konstantin Karman, Artur Luchkov, Ivan Barzenka

Background information
- Origin: Minsk, Belarus
- Genres: Rock; alternative rock; post-grunge
- Years active: 1998–2007
- Label: West
- Past members: Konstantin Karman; Syargey Kondratenka; Ivan Barzenka; Pavel Kudrin; Eugene Vial; Aleh Vial; Artur Luchkov

Jitters (Note: The term, which comes from Bristol, UK, is used to describe (sometimes in a derogatory manner) a fan of (hard) rock music or men with long hair, also being a slang term commonly used to refer to skateboarders or people who wear baggy clothes, sweatshirts, and listen mostly to rock music (including punk-rock).) (Russian: «Джи́ттерс») was a rock band from Minsk, Belarus, which played mostly rock and post-grunge. The band was formed in 1998 and released the album Split Before, Together Now (with Hair Peace Salon), as well as several EPs. In 2007, Jitters broke up and its members joined other groups: Konstantin Karman teamed up with Hair Peace Salon, and Ivan Barzenka and Pavel Kudrin joined beZ bileta.

== History ==
=== Early years as a trio (1998–2002) ===
Jitters was founded by school friends Konstantin Karman, Syargey Kondratenka, and Eugene Vial in Minsk, Belarus, in 1998. Inspired by the works of world-famous grunge and alternative rock groups Soundgarden, the Smashing Pumpkins, Pearl Jam, Alice in Chains, Nirvana, and Mudhoney, the trio acquired their first musical instruments and decided to learn how to play melodic, solemn, and psychedelic rock tunes.

Their first performance was held at the Minsk club Alternative (later known as the A-Club) in 1999. Their debut promo CD included two English-language compositions, "Floating Light" and "Consumed". Oleg "OK" Klimov from the Muzykalnaya Gazeta reviewed the disc and said the songs were written by "new romantics who have been down with Britpop". Thanks to the demo, the band was invited to participate in the national music festival Rock-kola in Novopolotsk in 2001.

The following year, Jitters almost disbanded as drummer Vial emigrated and left the trio, while Karman began playing bass with the band Маркі. Jitters went on a half-year hiatus but returned with a new lineup.

=== Quartet (2003–2007) ===
In 2003, Jitters became a quartet. Guitarist and backing vocalist Aleh Vial and drummer Artur Luchkov joined founders Konstantin and Syargey. Both new musicians played in the indie rock band Hair Peace Salon as well.

The band won first prize in the category "Rock Music" at the Piirideta Muusika festival in Narva, Estonia, in June 2004, where Hair Peace Salon performed as well. In July of the same year, they participated in the Polish festival Basovišča. For this performance, Volha "OSa" Samusik from Muzykalnaya Gazeta compared them to British rock band Muse

In October 2005, Vial left Jitters in order to devote more time to Hair Peace Salon, where he sang lead vocals and played guitar. He was replaced by Ivan Barzenka, who had previously played in the bands Rosary, Paparis, Port Mone, and Па Глазам. In the spring of 2006, Jitters invited a new drummer, Pavel Kudrin, to record the EP Pick Me Up. Luckov remained with the band as a touring drummer.

Jitters spent 2006 playing frequent concerts and touring with Hair Peace Salon, Open Space, and Milque Twins. Together with Hair Peace Salon, they played the Polish festivals Rock bez Igły in Tychy, and Fiesta Borealis in Olecko.

In 2007, Karman joined Hair Peace Salon, and the two bands released the split album Split Before, Together Now, which combined Pick Me Up with Hair Peace Salon's Gipsy. Music critic Alena Sobolevskaya from Muzykalnaya Gazeta, in reviewing the album, wrote "The collective captivates with very intelligent but interesting and bold energy. Hooligan vocals insistently crawl through the ears, very confident arrangements give a pleasure".

=== Cessation of activity (2008) ===
On the eve of the release of the split album in 2007, Karman told xlam.by "We decided to temporarily freeze the Jitters project, and since we have been acquainted and on friendly terms with Hair Peace Salon for a long time, there were no obstacles to unification. We have been exchanging musicians previously. There will be two voices in HPS now". Pavel Kudrin and Ivan Barzenka joined beZ bileta. Barzenka later became the frontman of the funk rock band ContraBanda. Lead guitarist Syargey Kondratenka moved to the Netherlands.

== Discography ==
- Promo Disk 2000 EP (2000)
- Promo Disk 2003 EP (2003)
- Promo Disk 2004 EP (2004)
- Promo Disk 2005 EP (2005)
- Jaded EP (2005)
- Pick Me Up EP (2006)
- Split Before, Together Now (split album with Hair Peace Salon, 2007)

== Band members ==
- Konstantin Karman – lead vocals, bass (1998–2007)
- Syargey Kondratenka – guitar (1998–2007)
- Ivan Barzenka – lead guitar, backing vocals, keyboards (2005–2007)
- Pavel Kudrin – drums (2006–2007)
- Eugene Vial – drums (1998–2002)
- Aleh Vial – lead guitar, backing vocals (2003–2005)
- Artur Luchkov – drums (2003–2006)

Timeline

== Literature ==
- Д.П. (2008). "«Jitters»". Энцыклапедыя беларускай папулярнай музыкі (2000 экз ed.). Мінск: Zmicier Kołas. pp. 101–102. ISBN 978-985-6783-42-8. уклад. Дз. Падбярэзскі і інш
