= Penkin =

Penkin (Russian: Пенкин, from пенка, meaning foam) is a Russian masculine surname, its feminine counterpart is Penkina. Notable people with the surname include:

- Kevin Penkin (born 1992), British-Australian composer
- Svetlana Penkina (1951–2016), Soviet actress
- Sergey Penkin (born 1961), Russian singer, composer and actor
