= Larisa Gribaleva =

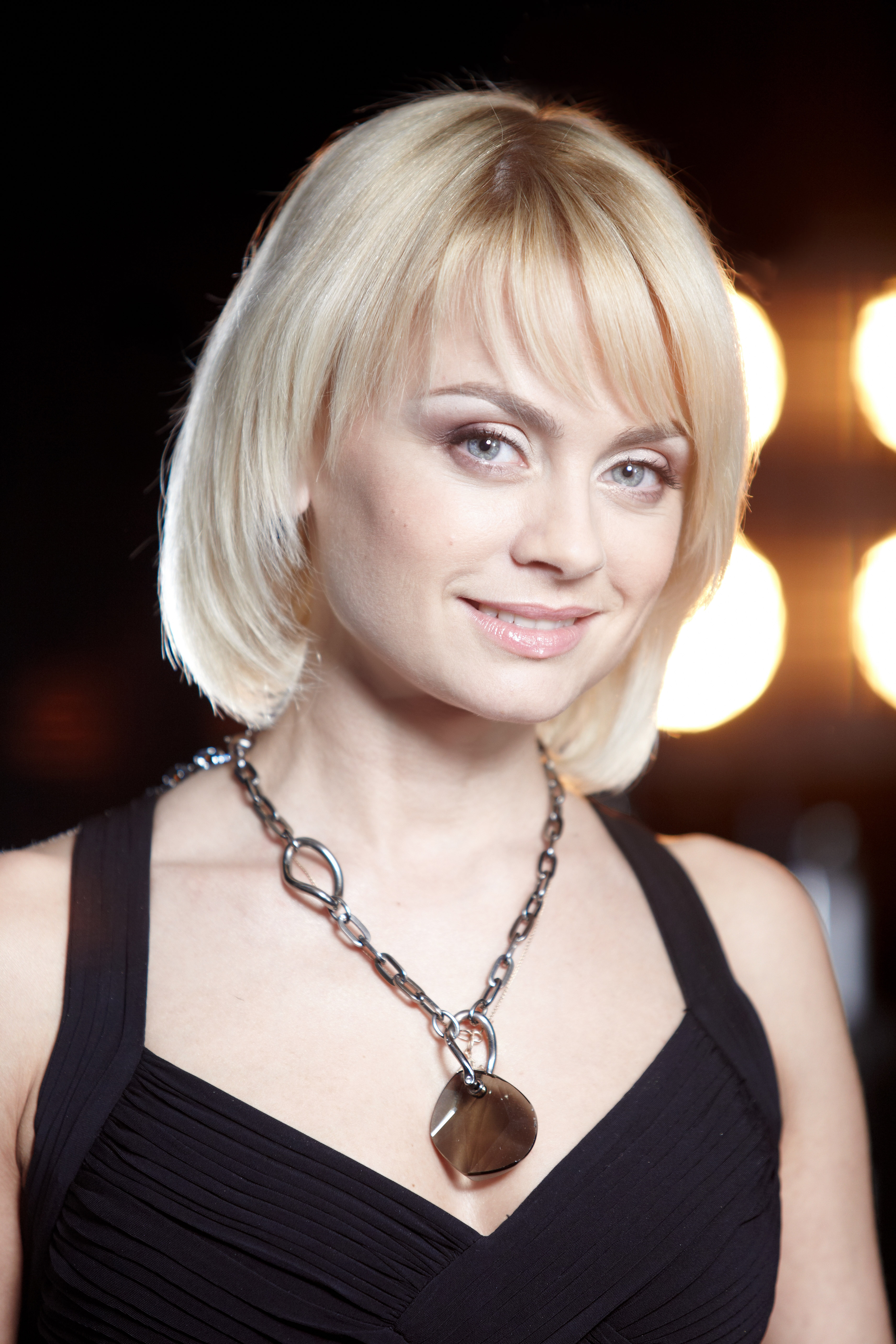
- Born: Larisa Vladimirovna Gribaleva; 20 October 1973 (age 52); Polotsk, Belarusian SSR, Soviet Union
- Occupations: Singer, TV presenter, actress
- Spouse: Alexander Staver
- Children: 3
- Musical career
- Genres: Pop; Pop rock
- Instrument: Vocals

Larisa Vladimirovna Gribaleva (Belarusian: Грыбалëва Лары́са Уладзíміраўна, Russian: Лариса Владимировна Грибалёва; born 20 October 1973) is a Belarusian singer, TV presenter and actress.

== Biography ==
=== Early life ===
Gribaleva was born on 20 October 1973 in the city of Polotsk to Vladimir Vasilievich Gribalev, a soldier and Valentina Semyonovna Gribaleva, a chief accountant. The family lived for several years in Africa and the Far East (Blagoveshchensk). In 1992, Gribaleva and her parents returned to Belarus. She graduated from Vitebsk State University with a degree in primary school teacher. While studying, she gave two recitals in Blagoveshchensk and Vitebsk.

=== Career ===
Gribaleva's creative activity began with a victory in the competition of young performers of the festival of Belarusian song and poetry "Molodechno-94", after which the young artist was invited to the National Concert Orchestra of the Republic of Belarus under the direction of Mikhail Finberg, where she worked as a soloist from 1994 to 2009. During this period, the artist recorded solo songs, acted in films.

In 1994, her television career began. TV presenter and producer Yegor Khrustalev invited Gribaleva to television auditions, after which the young actress became the permanent host of the popular weekly entertainment program "It's okay, mom!" on Belarusian television. In 2003, she released the album "Something". The result of musical collaboration with Yegor Khrustalev was the songs "You will see", "The sun in cold water", "News". The song "Something" became the singer's trademark and was nominated for Best Song of 2004. The director of the clips for the songs "Something" and "Novosti" was E. Khrustalev.

From 1997 to 2000, Gribaleva, together with Yuri Nikolaev, hosted the TV program "Morning Mail" on the ORT TV channel, and from 2000 to 2004 - the programs of the Belarusian television "In bed with Larisa Gribaleva" (Kanal 8), "Good morning, Belarus!" (Belteleradio). In 2002 she played the role of the jury Moskalenko in the TV series "Law". In 2004, she recorded the song "Katyusha" for the project "Belorussky Station" (the best songs of the war years). In 2007, she was one of the presenters of the "Dance until the Morning" concert, which took place as part of the Slavianski Bazaar in Vitebsk. At the end of 2008, she starred in the New Year's musical film "Batleyka" (ONT).

At the end of 2009, the singer ended her collaboration with the orchestra conducted by Finberg and began a solo career. In 2010, Gribaleva conducted a tour of the cities of Belarus "Everything will be fine". In 2009, she recorded the song "Everything will be fine", which Bianka wrote for her. The song hit the air of radio stations in Belarus. In 2012, she presented a new concert program "Fire Girl" with a permanent team of "live" musicians.

Gribaleva constantly collaborates with Sasha Nemo, Leonid Shirin, Yaroslav Rakitin. In 2006, the song "Speaks and Shows" to the words of Shirin was selected for the festival "Song of the Year of Belarus". In the same year, she recorded the song “Let them admire” for the “Silver Gramophone” project (ONT). In 2007 she took part in the Chocolate Microphone (LAD) music television award. In 2012, she recorded a duet with Nemo with the song "I Want, I Want", which was included in Nemo's fourth album, "What else is needed." Igor Laletin is the sound producer of many of Larisa's songs.

From 8 November 2008 to 2012, Gribaleva was the host of the "Morning Mail with Yuri Nikolaev and Larisa Gribaleva" program on the RTR-Belarus TV channel (from May to October 2009, the show was aired under the title Morning mail ", from July to October 2009, every month one issue was published under the title "Morning mail with Yuri Nikolaev and Larisa Gribaleva ", from 31 October 2009 to 22 October 2011 transmission came out under the name "Morning mail with Larisa Gribaleva", since 17 March 2012 - under the name "Morning@mail"). Larisa Gribaleva actively [how much?] Participated in the projects "New Year - a family holiday" (RTR-Belarus), "Favorite songs for a beloved mother" (RTR-Belarus), "Clash of the Titans" (ONT), "Star Ring" (Capital TV), “Singing cities” (Belarusian version of the British project The X Factor) on the Stolichnoye television channel. From 2006 to 2010, she organized the project “TOP 50 successful and beautiful people of the city of Minsk”. In 2012, she played herself in the film Above the Sky.

In 2013, a new album by Gribaleva was released, "Do not offend me". The album includes 13 songs, including "Until tomorrow", "At random", "Watch", "With you". Clips were shot for the songs "Nagad", "Hours". The title track of the album was voted Best Song of the Year at Lira. In 2014, Gribaleva took part in the theatrical production "Two henpecked", where she played the main role. Stage partners are Yegor Khrustalev and Vladimir Maksimkov. In the Spring of 2015, Gribaleva's video for the song "Forgotten Happiness" (directed by Andrei Guzel and Viktor Oskirko) was shot.

== Other work ==
=== Charity ===
Engaged in charitable activities, Gribaleva is the organizer of the Golden Heart project, which aims to help seriously ill children in Belarus. In 2011, she took part in the Truth of the Heart charity event to support children with heart disease.

=== Business ===
Gribaleva is the owner of the agency “Festive Bureau of Larisa Gribaleva”. The agency is the owner of the Choice of the Year award in 2008–2010, as well as the Red Carrot award in the Best Holiday Agency nomination.

== Personal life ==
Gribaleva is married to Alexander Staver, a businessman. They have three children Alisa (born 2003), Arseny (born 2005) and Alena (born 29 February 2016).

== Discography ==
- 2003 — Что-нибудь (Anything)
- 2013 — Не обижай меня (Don't hurt me)

== Music videos ==
- "I'm Walking" (directed by V. Yankovsky)
- "Taxi"
- "Katyusha"
- "First of all, the planes"
- "Minsk Speaks and Shows" (dir. Anatoly Vecher)
- "Something"

== Television work ==
- 1996-2004 - host of the program "It's okay, mom!", Channel One.
- 1997-2000 - host of the Morning Mail program, ORT.
- 2000-2002 - author and host of the program "In bed with Larisa Gribaleva", Channel 8.
- 2001-2004 - host of the program "Good morning, Belarus!", Channel One.
- 2008-2012 - host of the program Morning Mail with Yuri Nikolaev and Larisa Gribaleva, RTR-Belarus.

== Filmography ==
Year	Title	Role	Notes
1998	Greetings from Trumpet Charlie	presenter	
1999	Kamenskaya	Tanya, bride	
2002	Law	Juror Moskalenko	
2004	Women in a Game Without Rules	Apartment owner	
2004	Heaven and Earth		
2005	Sunday in the Women's Bath	Irochka	
2008	Kind and Good People Live in the World	Natasha, choral conductor	
2012	Above the Sky	herself	
2017	Small Homeland	Tamara	

== Awards and honors ==
- 1994 - laureate of the second prize of the competition "Maladzechna-94".
- 2003 - the prize of the First national competition in the field of public relations development "Premiya-2003" in the nomination "Best PR-person".
- 2005 - "Person of the Year - 2005".
- 2010 - event-award "Red Carrot" - "Best Singer".
- 2010 - "CTB Music Award" in the nomination "Best Tour of the Year" ("Everything will be fine" tour).
- 2009, 2010, 2011 - music award “Song of the Year of Belarus”.
- 2011 - event-award "Red Carrot" - "Best event-project" ("Holiday agency of Larisa Gribaleva")
- 2012 - "Lira-2012" in the nomination "Best Song of the Year" ("Do not offend me")
- 2012 - "Brand of the Year 2012". Gold medal in the nomination "Brand Person of the Year" ("Show Business")
- 2013 - TOP-10 most successful women in Belarus
