= Vladimir Mulyavin =

Belarusian rock musician (1941–2003)

- Владимир Мулявин
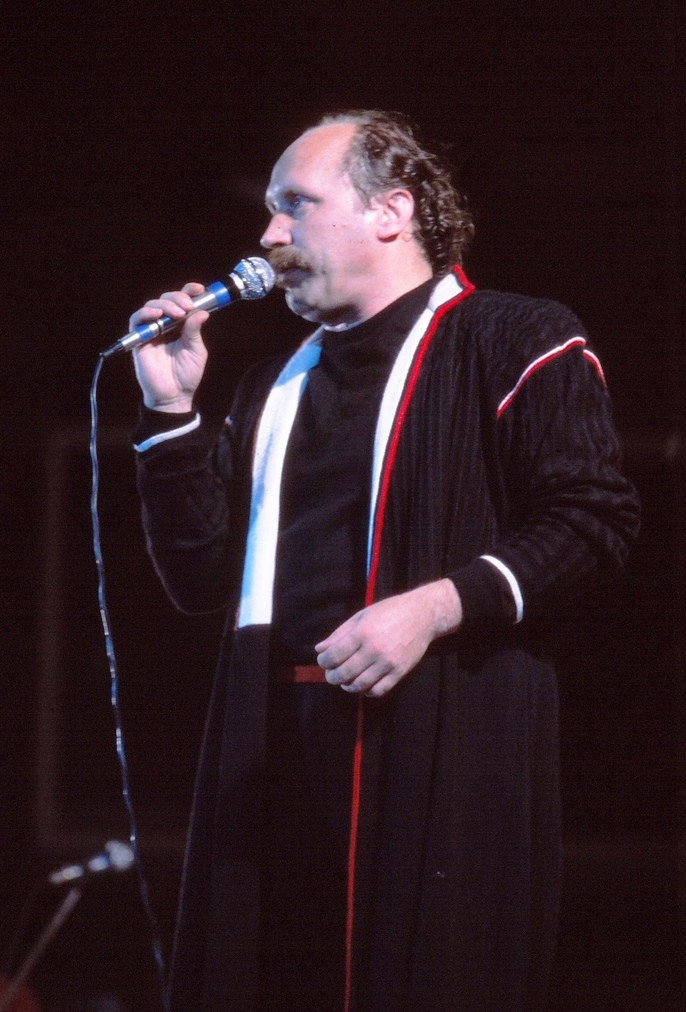
- Mulyavin in 2000
- Born: 12 January 1941; Sverdlovsk, Russian SFSR, Soviet Union
- Died: 26 January 2003 (aged 62); Moscow, Russia
- Occupations: musician, composer
- Years active: 1969–2003
- Label: Melodiya
- Title: People's Artist of the USSR (1991)
- Awards: Order of Francysk Skaryna, Lira 2011

Vladimir Georgievich Mulyavin (Russian: Влади́мир Гео́ргиевич Муля́вин; Belarusian: Уладзімер Георгіевіч Мулявін (Uladzimer Heorhijevič Muliavin); 12 January 1941 – 26 January 2003) was a Belarusian rock musician and the founder of the folk-rock band Pesniary.

== Biography ==
Vladimir Mulyavin was born in Sverdlovsk (now Yekaterinburg) in the family of a worker at the Uralmash plant. He started playing the guitar at the age of 12.

In 1956, after graduating from school, he entered Sverdlovsk Musical School, department of stringed instruments. He was expelled from the school for misconduct and an overt interest in jazz, nevertheless he was reinstated after some time, and he left the school by own initiative.

Between 1958 and 1963, he worked as a staff musician at different regional orchestras.

In 1963, he was offered a job with the Belarusian State Philharmony and moved to Belarus.

In 1965—1967 Mulyavin conducted his compulsory two-year military service, near Minsk. He founded a vocal quartet in the company and took a part in the Belarusian military district ensemble foundation.

== With the Pesniary ==
After his discharge from the army returned to the Belarusian State Philharmony and in 1968, he created the folk pop and rock group "Liavony". In 1970, he became its leader and the group was renamed Pesniary.

The band gained significant popularity across the whole USSR and was among the first successful and officially recognized Soviet rock bands. For his work, Vladimir Mulyavin was awarded the title People's Artist of the USSR.

An ethnic Russian himself, Muliavin was inspired by Belarusian folklore. He later also recorded several Belarusian national songs as Pahonia on the lyrics by Maksim Bahdanovich.

He died on 26 January 2003 in Moscow, suffering results of a car accident of 8 months before.

== Appraisal ==
In 2011 beZ bileta's frontman Vitaly Artist called Mulyavin “the cosmonaut No. 1 in Belarusian music.”

== Personal life ==
Mulyavin had a brother Valery, who played with the Pesniary; he died in 1973 in Yalta. Vladimir Mulyavin married three times, first to Lidia Karmalskaya, with whom he had a daughter Maria (born 1961) and a son Vladimir Mulyavin Jr. (1975–2006). Mulyavin left Karmalskaya in 1975 and had little contact with his son. After the death of his father, Mulyavin Jr. played viola with the Pesnyary in 2004–2005. He was sentenced in 2005 for a brawl and distribution of narcotics, and died in jail in 2006.

After leaving Karmalskaya, Mulyavin married Svetlana Slizskaya; they had a daughter Olga born in 1976. He divorced Slizskaya in 1981 and married actress Svetlana Penkina; they had a son Valery born in 1982.

== Legacy ==
- In July 2004, a street in Minsk (Bulvar Mulyavina) was named after Vladimir Muliavin.
- in 2001 Mulyavin and "Pesniary" get star on the Star Square in Moscow.
- In 2006, a monument of Mulyavin was raised at his grave. The same year, a commemorative plaque was installed in Yekaterinburg, and a monument of Mulyavin will be completed in the city around August 2014.
- A documentary of Mulyavin was filmed in 2007.
- Belarusian postal stamp dedicated to Mulyavin was issued in 2009.
