= Alexander Solodukha =

Belarusian pop singer

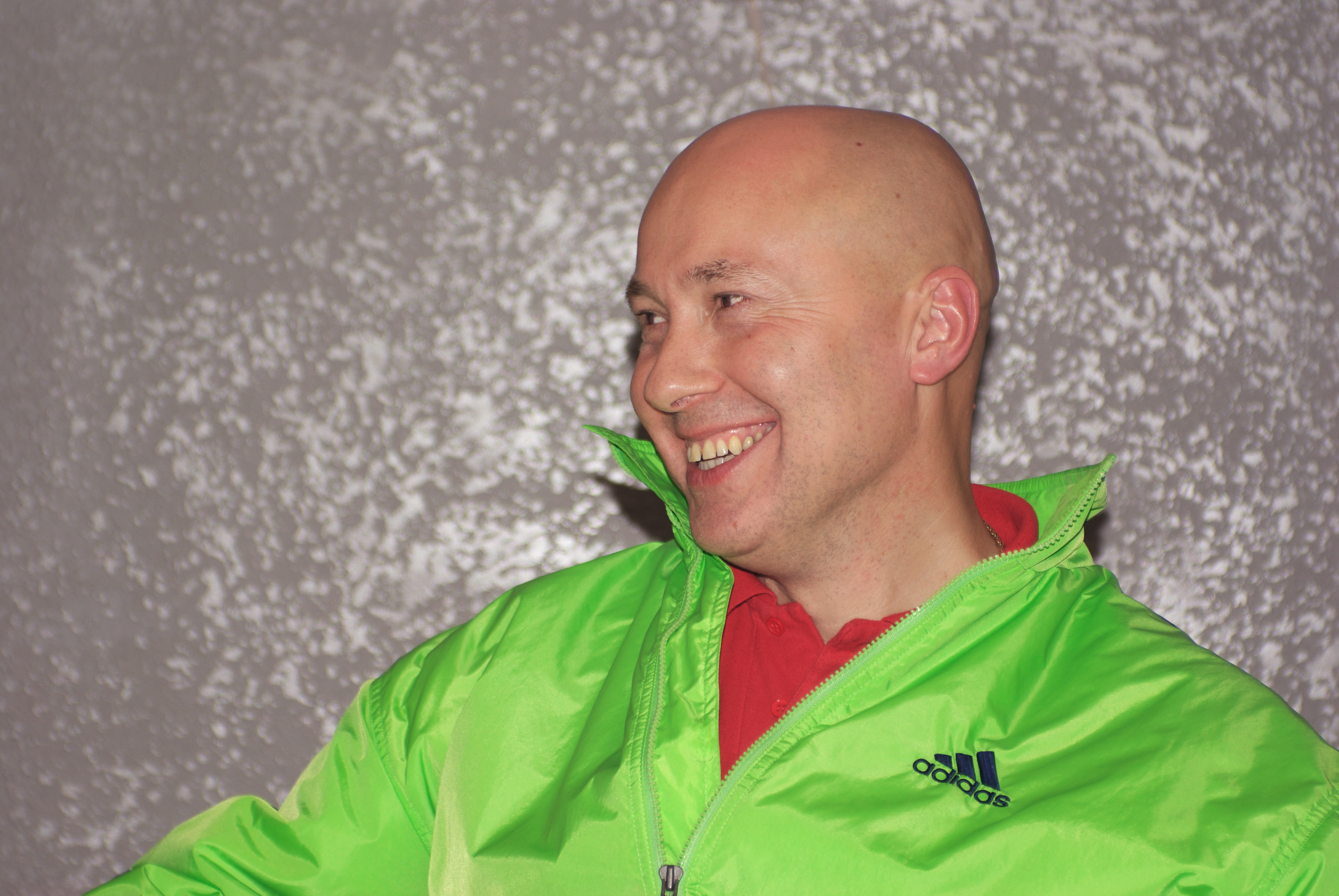

Alexander Antonovich Solodukha (Belarusian: Аляксандр Антонавич Саладуха; born January 18, 1959, in Kamenka, Sergiyevo-Posadsky District, Moscow Oblast) is a Belarusian singer.

In 1991 Alexander starts his solo career, performing in a Band "Carousel."

Solodukha names Valery Leontiev and Stas Mikhaylov as singers who influenced him.

In 1995, Alexander Solodukha comes to Russia to record his first album, "Hello, Some Strangers' Sweetheart." By the present moment, the performed has released 4 albums.

At the National Music Awards 2012 presented by the Ministry of Culture of the Republic of Belarus and the Capital TV channel, Solodukha was honored in the category of “Best Tour” as well as “Creativity of the Year” (together with participants of the project Russian: Поющие города from Minsk).

In September 2020, he starred in the video “They Don’t Give Up Your Loved One”, the purpose of which is to support Alexander Lukashenko during Belarusian mass protests against election fraud.
