= Promo Disk 2000 =

EP by Jitters
- Released: 2000
- Genre: Grunge

Jitters chronology
Promo Disk 2000 (2000)	Promo Disk 2003 (2003)

Promo Disk 2000 (also known as Jitters) is the debut EP by Belarusian rock band Jitters, released in 2000. Both songs were written in English.

== Critical reception ==
While reviewing the album, О’К, columnist music periodical Muzykalnaya Gazeta, wrote: "All over the flatness, this is free music, the music of new-new romantics who have been down with Britpop and are looking for something else based on it, therefore there is no such usual guitar rhythm, the instrument even sometimes goes backwards, but everything is also full of guitars and absently melodious".

== Track listing ==
1. "Floating Light"
2. "Consumed"

== Personnel ==
- Konstantin Karman – lead vocals, bass
- Syargey Kondratenka – guitar
- Eugene Vial – drums
