= Sergei Balenok =

Belarusian artist

- Belarusian: Сяргей Уладзіміравіч Балянок
- Born: Сяргей Уладзіміравіч Баленок; May 31, 1954 (age 71); Boiarka, Kyiv-Sviatoshyn Raion, Kyiv Oblast, Ukrainian Soviet Socialist Republic, Soviet Union
- Education: Yuriy Charyshnikov
- Alma mater: Ukrainian Academy of Printing
- Known for: easel painting, book illustration
- Notable work: Gentleman, The planet is being sold, A slice of memory, The bird that is drinking water of the puddle, Stroll
- Style: etching
- Website: balenok.com

Sergei Balenok (Belarusian: Сяргей Уладзіміравіч Балянок; born on May 31, 1954, Boiarka, Kyiv Oblast, Ukraine) is a Belarusian graphic artist, painter, and illustrator.

== Biography ==
In 1976–1980 he studied at the Ukrainian Polygraphic Institute named after Ivan Fedorov in Lviv and was taught by Yuriy Charyshnikov. After graduation, he moved to Minsk. He served in the army. In 1987 he graduated from the Academic Arts workshops of the Academy of Arts of the USSR.

From 1980 to 1995 he worked as an art editor in Minsk publishing houses, illustrating books and designing fiction collections. From 1986 to 1992 he was the chief art editor of the publishing house “Erydan” (Minsk). In 1993 he was the chief art editor of the publishing house “Belarus” (Minsk). From 1993 to 1995 he was the director of the private publisher “Balenok & Co”. Since 1995 he is a freelance artist. Since 2011 he is a senior research fellow at the Exhibition Department of the National Center of Contemporary Arts of the Republic of Belarus too.

He was a member of the Union of Artists of the BSSR and the Belarusian Union of Artists (1988–2004 years). He takes part in exhibitions since 1976: personal ones in 1987, 2004, 2006, 2010, 2011, 2012, 2014, 2015, 2017, 2018, 2019 (Minsk); 1992 – Gdansk (Poland); 1995 – Eindhoven (Netherlands); 1998 – Copenhagen (Denmark); 2017 – Ravne na Koroškem (Slovenia).

== Oeuvre ==
He works in book and easel drawing (mainly in etchings), easel paintings. His compositions decorated books of Isaac Asimov, Ray Bradbury, Robert Sheckley, Kurt Vonnegut. Except for the decoration of the publications of Jules Verne, he does not work on commissions.

According to the artist, art should not banal reproduce the world, its task is to create new worlds. He is successful in depicting emotions, moods, sensations, feelings of any normal human being.

His works are showcased in the National Art Museum of the Republic of Belarus, the Museum of Contemporary Fine Art (Minsk), the graphic museum of Winterthur (Switzerland), the art museums of the cities: Polotsk (Belarus), New Brunswick (USA), Rimini (Italy), Kraków (Poland), Győr (Hungary), Eindhoven (Netherlands), Munich (Germany), as well as in private Belarusian (Alexandr Ivanov) and foreign collections.

== Criticism ==
Works of the artist “capture attention with both high aesthetics and slight irony of usual but seen in the unusual perspective images”, the newspaper Novy Chas invited to visit the artist’s exhibition in 2017. “Balenok's works are distinctive of philosophizing, and despite the „black and white“ style, filled with the bright light of experience, deep reflections of the artist,” the radio station Belaruskaje Radyjo Razyja transmitted impressions from the artist’s exhibition in the Polotsk Art Gallery in 2016.

Alisa Mikhailova in the reportage on the Belarus-1 channel from a regular Balenok's exhibition stressed that the features of abstraction, surrealism, and realism are organically put on display in the artist’s works. Art critic Larisa Finkel’steyn in 2014 identified paintings of the artist as “very unexpected and lyrical, in which there is a free movement of color.” At the opening of the solo exhibition dedicated to the 60th anniversary of engraver, Belarusian art historian Natalla Sharangovich praised him with the words, “This is really a fine artist. I have been familiar with his oeuvre for many years, and he is always unpredictable for me.” “The author has a rare quality for a modern creator – the ability to surprise,” Kamila Januškievič assessed the work on the pages of the magazine “Mastactva” following the results of the artist’s exhibition in 2014.

Andrey Adamovich observed notes of the Apocalypse in the works of Sergei Balenok. Art critic Alesya Romanyuk called his works as “the most somber ones among all seen, as they show a rotten parallel world, in whose existence you don’t want to believe, even if it is the fruit of the author’s imagination.”

== Personal life ==
He is married and has two children.

== Literature ==
- Борозна, М. (1990). Баленок: Каталог / [Составитель Борозна М. Г.] (in Russian). М.: Прометей. p. 34.
- Небышинец, И. В. (2008). ""...И завтра тоже...". Офорты Сергея Баленка". Паведамленні Нацыянальнага мастацкага музея Рэспублікі Беларусь: навукова-інфармацыйнае выданне (in Russian). 7. Мінск: 15–18.
