= Pick Me Up (EP) =

EP by Jitters
- Released: June 1, 2006
- Recorded: 2006
- Studio: Vyacheslav Bankevich’s studio
- Genre: Rock and roll, Britpop, brit rock
- Length: 18:44
- Producer: Jitters

Jitters chronology
Jaded (2005)	Pick Me Up (2006)	Split Before, Together Now (2007)

Pick Me Up is an EP by the Belarusian rock band Jitters recorded at Vyacheslav Bankevich's studio in Baranavichy and self-released on June 1, 2006. All songs were written by Konstantin Karman in the English language. The presentation of the mini-album was held on October 25, 2006, at the Minsk club “Russian: ЁЁ.” In 2007, the EP was re-released as part of the split-album Split Before, Together Now by the band's Hair Peace Salon and Jitters.

== Critical reception ==
In a positive review on “a mini-album or maxi-single,” Slap, author over at the portal Xlam.by, noted that “the album is even as to the quality of the musical material, with an integral mood, has a pair of unconditional hits” and it broadcasts “the modern sound of rock and roll”.

Tat’yana Zamirovskaya from BelGazeta described the music of Jitters in the review of the album Split Before, Together Now with the words, “annoying, authentic and blues-like eccentric – it has a crazy dancing Gomez-like and Happy Mondays-like style, and there are no pretentious reflections.” The naughtiness and dance guitar rock of Jitters were appreciated by Alena Sobolevskaya from Muzykalnaya Gazeta, on the pages of which she compared the music of the band with the works of Travis, Radiohead, Muse, Blur, and Coldplay.

== Track listing ==
No.	Title	Lyrics	Music	Length
1.	"Pick-Me-Up"	Konstantin Karman	Konstantin Karman	3:47
2.	"Staggering"	Konstantin Karman	Konstantin Karman	4:23
3.	"Sapphire"	Konstantin Karman	Konstantin Karman	4:13
4.	"Dint"	Konstantin Karman	Konstantin Karman	3:06
5.	"Pixies"	Konstantin Karman	Konstantin Karman	3:15

== Personnel ==
Jitters:

- Konstantin Karman — lead vocals, bass.
- Ivan Barzenka — guitars, back vocals, keyboards.
- Syargey Kondratenka — guitars.
- Pavel Kudrin — drums.

Production:

- Vyacheslav Bankevich — recording and mixing.
