= Svetlana Penkina =

Soviet actress

Svetlana Mulyavina-Penkina
- Светлана Мулявина-Пенкина
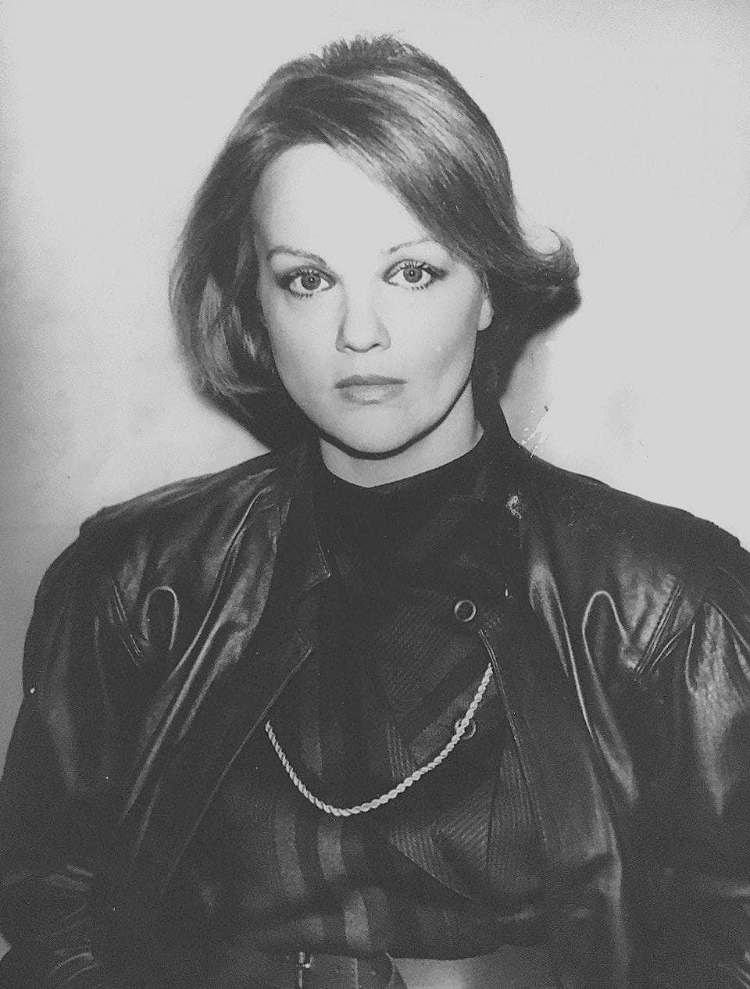
- Svetlana Mulyavina-Penkina
- Born: Svetlana Alexandrovna Penkina; 6 June 1951; Byelorussian SSR
- Died: c. 20 October 2016 (aged 65); Minsk, Belarus
- Occupation: Actress
- Years active: 1971–1985
- Spouse(s): Vladimir Mulyavin (m. 1981-2003; his death); 1 child

Svetlana Alexandrovna Mulyavina-Penkina (Russian: Светлана Александровна Мулявина-Пенкина; Belarusian: Святлана Аляксандраўна Пенкіна; 6 June 1951 – October 2016) was a Soviet actress.

== Career ==
Svetlana Penkina graduated from the Minsk Theater and Art Institute. She got the first taste of success for her role of Katya Bulavina in the Soviet thirteen-episode television drama series The Road to Calvary (Russian: Хождение по мукам) based on the trilogy The Road to Calvary (Russian: Хождение по мукам) by Aleksey Tolstoy. The role was her diploma work at the Minsk Theater Institute.

While working on the character, the young actress co-starred in two films. In the movie Dust in the Sun (Russian: Пыль под солнцем) she played Anna Mikhailovna, an associate of Lithuanian revolutionary Joseph Vareikis. In The Color of Gold (Russian: Цвет золота) she appeared in one of the starring roles, Zoya.

In 1982, she played Lida in The Solar Wind (Russian: Солнечный ветер). In 1985, she had the role of secretary Vika in For The Coming Age, the adaptation of the novel by Soviet writer Georgiy Markov. Soon after that, she retired from movie roles.

== Personal life ==
Svetlana Penkina was born in 1951 in Belarus. the daughter of Alexander Pavlovich Penkin, who was a colonel in the army. In 1981, she married musician and singer Vladimir Mulyavin (1941– 2003); the couple had one child, a son, Valery Vladimirovich Mulyavin (born 1982). After her husband's (Vladimir Mulyavin) death, she changed her surname to Svetlana Mulyavina-Penkina.

== Death ==
On 20 October 2016, her body was found in her home. She was 65 years old. She was buried with her husband, Vladimir Mulyavin (1941-2003)

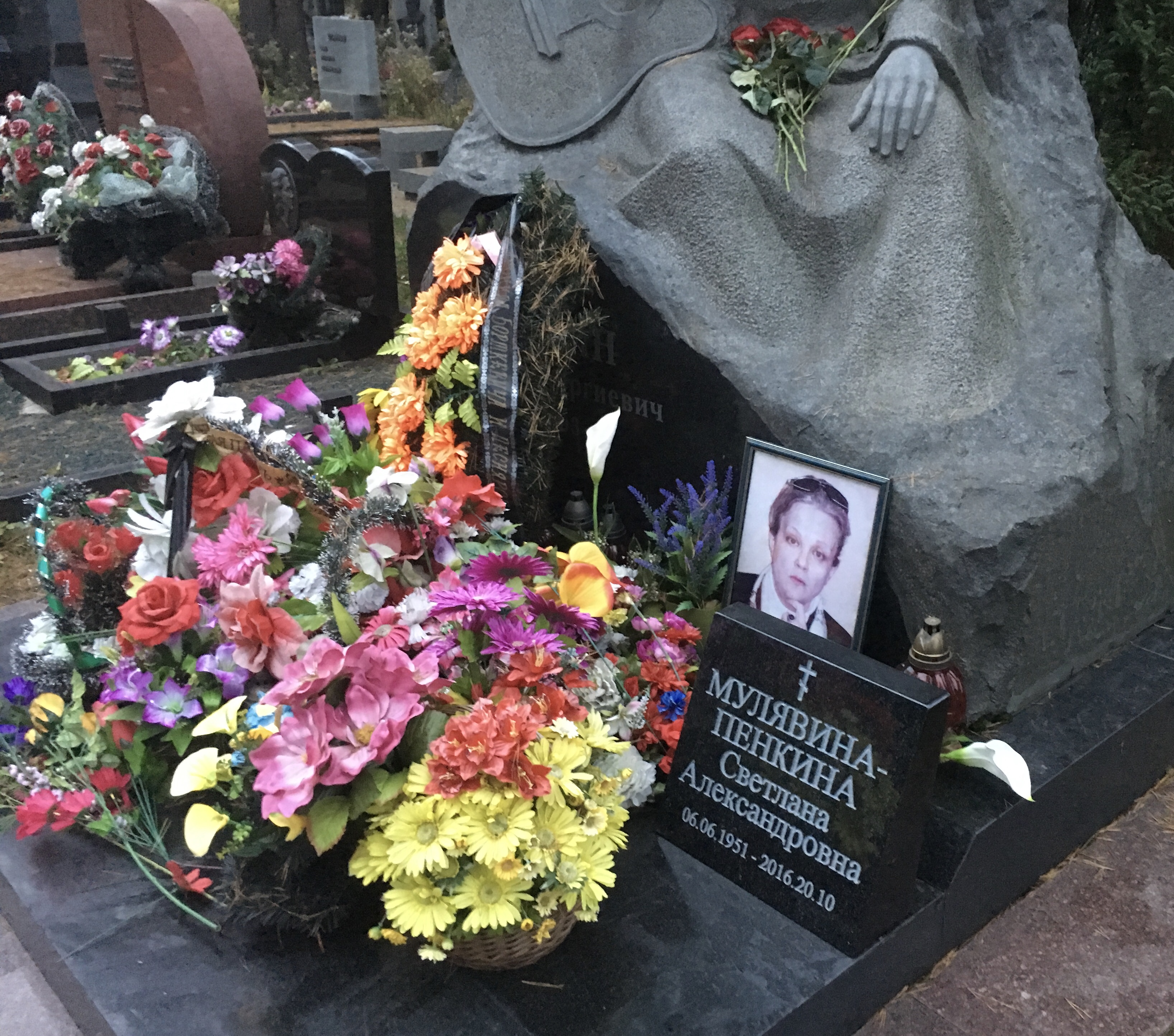
Buried with her husband Vladimir Mulyavin (1941-2003)

== Filmography ==
- 1971 - The Tomb of the lion (Могила льва) as (minor role)
- 1972 - The day of my sons (День моих сыновей) as Serova, patient
- 1974 - The Road to Calvary (Хождение по мукам) as Katya Bulavina
- 1974 - The Color of Gold (Цвет золота) as Zoya
- 1977 - And we had some quiet... (А у нас была тишина...) as Gustenka Drozdova
- 1977 - Dust in The Sun (Пыль под солнцем) as Anna
- 1978 - Order No. 1 (TV show) (Приказ номер один) as Orlova
- 1981 - Care for women (Берегите женщин) as Olga (major role)
- 1982 - The Solar Wind (Солнечный ветер) as Lida, Chebyshev's employee
- 1985 - For The Coming Age (Грядущему веку) as Vika, secretary
