= Vecherniy Minsk =

Belarusian newspaper

- Language: Russian
- Website: vminsk.by

Vecherniy Minsk is a Russian language newspaper published in Belarus.
