= BeZ bileta =

Belarusian rock band

beZ bileta
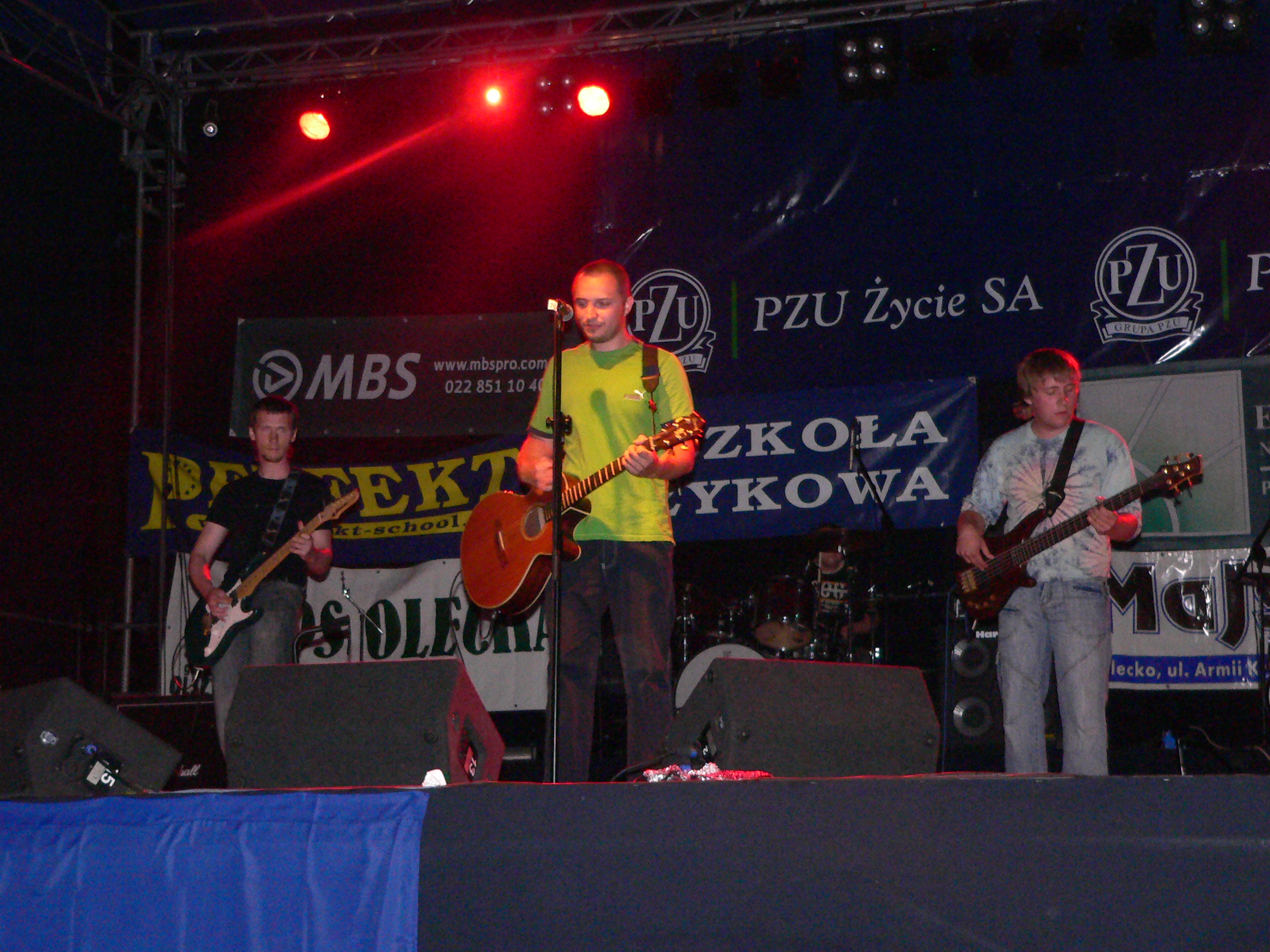
- beZ bileta performing in 2006

Background information
- Origin: Minsk, Belarus
- Genres: Indie rock; alternative rock; pop rock; synth rock
- Years active: 1998–2019; 2025
- Label: West
- Members: Vitaly Artist; Alexander Ivashkevich; Yan Weinstock
- Past members: Pavel Kudrin; Ivan Barzenka; Sergey Bakovets; Denis Sturchenko; Ksenia Minchenko; Alexander Myshkevich; Denis Shurov; Yuri Rubanik; Pavel Mamonov; Alexander Gulyaev; Yan Yarosh; Andrey Korotchenko; Vladimir Razvodovsky; Artemy Doronkin; Yegor Doronkin

beZ bileta is a Belarusian alternative rock band from Minsk, active since 1998.

== History ==
The group was formed in Minsk by Vitaly Artist in 1998. Having started with folk songs in Belarusian, by 2004, the band moved on to a more complex electronic and indie rock style.

beZ bileta have won the Rock Coronation Belarusian Music Award on several occasions, including in 2000 as "Discovery of the Year", "Song of the Year" in 2001 for their hit "My Motherland Belarus", and in 2009, where they received the main prize, the "Rock Crown", as well as prizes in the categories "Album of the Year" and "Video of the Year".

The band has performed at numerous festivals, both at home and abroad, including at Slavianski Bazaar in Vitebsk (Belarus), Basovišča (Poland), Fiesta Borealis (Poland—together with Hair Peace Salon and Jitters), Spirit of Woodstock (Italy), and Good-By (Germany).

At the Lira national music awards of 2012, presented by the Ministry of Culture of the Republic of Belarus and Capital TV, the band was honored in the category "Best Live Show".

In 2019, the group's founder announced the end of its activities. The band concluded its 20-year career with a concert at the Minsk-Arena. Vitaly Artist later stated that his departure from the stage was merely a "sabbatical". In 2025, the group released a new song.

== Deadhead's Day ==
For several years, beZ bileta have organized Deadhead's Day, an event which features merchandise giveaways, mini concerts, a song remix contest for musicians from different countries, and a cover song contest. The winner of Deadhead's Day has a chance to perform onstage together with beZ bileta.

== Vitaly Artist ==
The band's frontman, Vitaly Artist, has written music for various films and television productions, including the 2006 Russian action feature Piranha.

== Band members ==
Current

- Vitaly Artist – vocals, acoustic guitar, production
- Alexander Ivashkevich – guitar
- Yan Weinstock

Past

- Denis Shurov – drums
- Yuri Rubanik – keyboards
- Alexander Gulyaev – bass guitar
- Pavel Kudrin
- Ivan Barzenka
- Sergey Bakovets
- Denis Sturchenko

- Ksenia Minchenko
- Alexander Myshkevich
- Pavel Mamonov
- Yan Yarosh
- Andrey Korotchenko
- Vladimir Razvodovsky
- Artemy Doronkin
- Yegor Doronkin

== Discography ==
Year	Title
2001	Up Into the Sky
2004	Drawn
2006	Amendment 22
2007	Kino
2008	True Love
2009	Visionaries
2009	Africa
2010	Red Disc of the Sun
2011	Zvezda
2014	More
