= Open Space (band) =

Belarusian pop rock/indie rock band

- Origin: Minsk, Belarus
- Genres: pop rock, indie rock, britpop
- Years active: 2006–present
- Labels: West Records, Vigma
- Members: Vitaliy Matievskiy; Seva Maslov; Andrey Malashenko; Artem Buryakin
- Past members: Maxim Mestovskiy; Roman Sorokaletov
- Website: osband.com

Open Space is a pop rock and indie rock band from Minsk, Belarus. Formed in 2006 with an English repertoire and a few Belarusian songs, they later adapted mostly Russian lyrics. The band has released two full albums and several EPs and singles, but in recent years the musicians play together mostly as a cover band. Since 2017, frontman Vitaliy Matievskiy has focused on his synth-pop duo Days of Days, and since 2018 he also writes music for his solo electronic music project MATIVI.

== History ==
Open Space was formed in 2006 by Seva Maslov (bass) and Vitaliiy Matievsky (vocals, guitar). They were later joined by Maxim Mestovskiy (guitar) and Andrey Malashenko (drums).

In 2007 the band recorded their first demo EP Wake Up at the Graffity club in Minsk. They began performing regularly in Belarus, Ukraine, and Russia. In 2008 they released the 5-song EP Beautiful. In 2009 the band was nominated as Best New Artist at the annual Rock Coronation Awards in Belarus. In 2010 they won the award for Best Pop-Rock Band.

Open Space released their first full-length album Deal With Silence on the local label West Records in 2010. Also in 2010, the band played on main stages at the Be2gether and Basovišča music festivals. The EP Let It Go was released later that year.

Their second full-length album Pressure was released in 2012. At the 2012 National Music Awards presented by the Ministry of Culture of the Republic of Belarus and Capital TV, Open Space was honored as Best Rock Band.

== Musical style ==
A columnist for the newspaper Muzykalnaya Gazeta described the Open Space sound: "It felt like an overdose of Coldplay in the music. The only difference is that it is easier, more primitive, not so nice, and does not cling." The band has been noted for memorable dance rhythms decorated with heavy guitars. The band has "clinging, catchy songs designed for a wide audience," wrote the Belarusian music portal LiveSound, and "Open Space is a very strong band. The guys play great and will play for a very long time". The same publication described the sound of the band as soft Britpop, played very smoothly and professionally, though it is occasionally "boring". In 2010 hosts from European Radio for Belarus noted that the band is often confused with Hair Peace Salon and Coldplay.

== Band members ==
- Vitaliy Matievskiy (lead vocals, guitar) (2006–)
- Artem Buryakin (solo guitar, backing vocals) (2013–)
- Seva Maslov (bass guitar, backing vocals) (2006–)
- Andrey Malashenko (drums) (2006–)

Former members

- Maxim Mestovskiy (solo guitar, backing vocals) (2006–2012)
- Roman Sorakaletov (solo guitar, backing vocals) (2013)

Timeline

== Discography ==
- Wake Up (EP, 2007)
- Beautiful (EP, 2008)
- Deal With Silence (LP, 2009)
- Let It Go (EP, 2010)
- Bookseller (EP, 2011)
- Do You Remember (maxi single, 2012)
- Pressure (LP, 2012)
- Сделай Шаг (single, 2014)

=== Participation in collections ===
- «APS Sound» Volume 1 (2012)

== Press ==
- Ultra-Music.com "Deal With Silence review", January 30 2010
- Far From Moscow "Cambridge and Open Space: Pacific Fairy Tales and a Belarusian Happy Ending", January 6 2010
- Rolling Stone #65 January 2010, Disc review
- Far from Moscow "Open Space: Beautiful", January 23 2009
- Adekvat.us Open Space - Beautiful review, May 2008
- Livesound.by Boudless rock, May 2008
- Relax.by Beautiful presentation review, April 2008
- Euroradio.fm presentation review, April 2008
- Relax.by press release for Beautiful EP, April 2008
- Livesound.by concert review, November 2007
- Xlam.by concert review, November 2007
- Mass.by concert review, June 2007
- Generation.by portal concert review, June 2007
- Livesound.by disc review, September 2007
- Press release for Wake Up EP, September 2007
- Pozerov.net Interview with OS guitarist, August 2007
- British Spirit vol.1 concert, 3 May 2007
- Livesound.by portal review, June 2007
- Musical Newspaper interview, August 2006
