= Experty.by =

Belarusian music website

- Website type: mass media
- Available in: Russian, Belarusian
- Creator: Źmicier Biezkaravajny
- Website: experty.by
- Commercial: no
- Registration: optional
- Launched: 13 June 2008; 18 years ago
- Current status: frozen

Experty.by is a web-portal dedicated to music in Belarus, as well as the associated music awards of the same name of Belarusian music critics. Moreover, the portal acts as a coorganizer of another awards, the Rock Profi awards.

== History ==
The site was opened on June 13, 2008. The founders were Belarusian music journalist Źmicier Biezkaravajny (ex-editor of Muzykalnaya Gazeta, BelGazeta), who became the project director, Źmicier Padbiarezski (ex-editor of Belorusskaya Delovaya Gazeta, Radio Free Europe/Radio Liberty), Oleg “О’К” Klimov (ex-chief editor of Muzykalnaya Gazeta, the music magazine “НОТ-7”), and Siarhei Budkin (editor of Nasha Niva, Tuzin.fm). They got together for the systematic reporting and assessment of CDs of Belarusian artists to promote Belarusian music.

The basis of the project is the reviews of four regular contributors ("expert staffers"), who evaluate each album. In 2013, the original quartet was strengthened by Alexandr Chernuho (Ultra-music.com) and Egor Tsyvilko (blog "Broken CD"). Authors write reviews, set ratings, while their average becomes a final score assessed by the mass media. On the basis of these points, full charts are presented at the end of each-half year and year.

Since 2009, the editorial staff of the project was also diversified with the addition of the panel of 8 freelance experts, authoritative representatives of the Belarusian media community. Since 2010, almost all reviewed albums can be listened to on the website as well. In May of the same year the portal conducted its festival. Starting from 2014, the best album winner was being offered support in holding a concert.

For ten years, critics have evaluated more than 500 (including the classics of Lyapis Trubetskoy, N.R.M., Pesniary and some more released in 2007 and earlier) modern albums of Belarusian artists: 59 in 2008, 60 in 2009, 44 in 2010, 63 in 2011, 67 in 2012, 47 in 2013, 38 in 2014, 45 in 2015, 29 in 2016, 33 in 2017.

In 2018 the site was frozen on “indefinite leave,” per its project manager Źmicier Biezkaravajny. At the same time, the portal selected its top-10 albums for 2008–2017 being active, and Port Mone’s «Thou» topped the ultimate chart.

== Expert staffers ==
Staffers

- Źmicier Biezkaravajny – (2008–2018)
- Egor Tsyvilko – (2013–2018)
- Conrad Erofeev – (2016–2018)
- Nikolai Yankoit – (2016–2018)

Former staffers

- Źmicier Padbiarezski – (2008–2014)
- Oleg “О’К” Klimov – (2008–2014)
- Siarhei Budkin – (2008–2016)
- Alexandr Chernuho – (2013–2016)

Timeline

== Experty.by Awards ==
Experty.by’s annual awards call the best Belarusian album of each year in several versions (tops 10 for each of them are made known too).

- “Album of the Year” by expert staffers.
- “Grand Jury’s Prize” by the “Grand Jury,” consisting of representatives of the Belarusian mass media (4 full-time authors of the project plus 8 freelance experts).
- “Expert Staffers’ Prize” on the basis of the ratings of 4 expert staffers.
- “Foreign Expert Prize” based on tops 10 of music experts from countries border Belarus (Russia, Ukraine, Lithuania, Latvia, Poland).
- “People Experts’ Prize” (since 2009) based on the scores from the users of the site, which were rated at least 15% of the albums of the calendar year.
- “Best Debut Album,” “Best Album in the Belarusian language” (since 2009), stylistic categories are also awarded on the basis of points given by expert staffers.

=== Freelance experts (and members of the “Grand Jury” of the Experty.by Awards) ===
- Siarhei Budkin (since 2016).
- Źmicier Padbiarezski (since 2014).
- Vitali Drozdov (2008–2012) – Belarusian and Ukrainian FM-specialist, CEO of the radio station Hit FM.
- Maxim Zhbankov (since 2008) — culturologist, critic, contributor to BelGazeta, Belorusskaya Delovaya Gazeta, the magazine «Belarusian: Мастацтва.»
- Tat’yana Zamirovskaya (since 2008) — columnist over at BelGazeta, the magazine «Russian: Большой.»
- Nadzieja Kudrejka (since 2008) — journalist of First Channel, Radio 1.
- Viktar Siamaška (since 2008) – author and presenter of the radio programs «Belarusian: Новая зямля» over at Unistar Radio, «Belarusian: Кракатук» over at Radio Racyja.
- Siarhiej Pukst (2008–2010) – musician, music critic of Sovetskaya Belorussiya – Belarus' Segodnya.
- Siarhiej Malinoŭski (2008–2010) – journalist of Komsomolskaya Pravda v Belorusi, editor of Antenna.
- Anatoĺ Viečar (2008–2011) – author of music programs on TV, music video director.
- Jaŭhien Doŭhich (2011–2014) – former editor of the magazine «Russian: Джаз-квадрат», anchor of music programs over at Tut.By.
- Maryja Kalieśnikava (since 2011) – journalist of the European Radio for Belarus.
- Viačaslaŭ Radyjonaŭ (2012–2014) – founder and chief editor of the portal Ultra-music.com.
- Alexandr Korneychuk (2017) – chief editor of 34mag, DJ.
- Anna Markevych (2017) – anchor of Belsat Music Live, former journalist of the European Radio for Belarus.
- Maryna Savickaja (since 2016) – anchor of music programs over at Radio "Stolitsa".
- Sergey Filimonov (since 2013) – author and anchor of the music program «Belarusian: Відзьмо-невідзьмо», which was broadcast on Belarus-1, then Capital TV, now is broadcast on Belsat TV, former journalist of Vecherniy Minsk.
- Larysa Charuk (2017) – admin of the VK public «Беларуская музыка.»
- Alexandr Chernuho (since 2016) – editor of Onliner.by, former editor of Ultra-music.com and journalist of Narodnaya Gazeta.
- Iĺlia Malinoŭski (2013–2016) – music editor over at the European Radio for Belarus, former radio host (Radio Mir, Radio Minsk, more).
- Conrad Erofeev (2014–2015) – music critic over at Kyky.org.
- Nikolai Yankoit (2014–2015) – music critic over at Kyky.org, former editor of Ultra-music.com.
- Yegor Kvartal’ny (2013) – author and anchor of music programs over at Radio "Stolitsa".
- Yevgeniy Karpov (2015) – editor over at Tut.By, former editor of Ultra-music.com, contributor to New Eastern Europe, The Guardian.

=== Foreign experts ===
- 2017 – Ian Blaschak (Polityka, Poland), Emilija Visotskaitė (15min, Lithuania), Alexey Gorbash (The Flow, Russia), Maxim Serdyuk (Muzmapa, Ukraine), Ilmars Šlapins (Satori.lv, Latvia).
- 2016 — Andrey Bukharin (Rolling Stone Russia, Russia), Michał Vechorek (Gazeta Magnetofonowa, Poland), Henriks Eliass Zēgners (Delfi.lv and more, Latvia), Mila Kravchuk (Karabas Live, Ukraine), Valdas Lapeta (Ghost Note, Lithuania).
- 2015 — Lavrys Anstravts (Intro.lv, Latvia), Liudas Zakarevičus (Manomuzika.lt, Lithuania), Dmitry Kurkin (Zvuki.ru, Russia), Jacek Skolimowski (Newsweek Polska, Poland), Sergey Kane (Comma.com.ua, Ukraine).
- 2014 — Uldis Rudaks (Diena, Latvia), Andrzej Bong (Suru.lt, Lithuania), Boris Barabanov (Kommersant, Russia), Dominika Węcławek (MImagazyn.pl, Poland), Aleksiej Bondarenko (LiRoom.com.ua, Ukraine).
- 2013 — Normunds Vucāns (Eroks.lv, Latvia), Domininkas Kunčinas (Ore.lt, Lithuania), Alexey Mozhaev (Intermedia, Russia), Mariusz Herma (Polityka, Poland), Eugene Shabatin (Topmusic.in.ua, Ukraine).
- 2012 — Karolis Višniavskas (Delfi.lt, Lithuania), Kaspars Zavileiskis (Rīga 2014, Latvia), Julia Kolomiec (Rock.kiev.ua, Ukraine), Aliaksandr Filimonaŭ (Lenta.ru, Russia), Jarek Šubrecht (T-Mobile Music, Poland).
- 2011 — Aleksandr Gorbachyov (Afisha, Russia), Jānis Žilde (TVnet.lv, Latvia), Paweł Kostrzewa (Onet.pl, Poland), Konstantin Tregubav (RockYou, Ukraine), Darius Užkuraitis (Opus 3, Lithuania).
- 2010 — Denis Boyarinov (OpenSpace.ru, Russia), Robert Sankowski (Gazeta Wyborcza, Poland), Jonas Oškinis (Ore.lt, Lithuania), Dace Volfa (Mūzikas Saule, Latvia), Max Vihots (@music, Ukraine).
- 2009 — Artemy Troitsky (MSU Faculty of Journalism, Russia), Igar Panasav (@music, Ukraine), Ramūnas Zilnis (Lietuvos rytas, Lithuania), Jānis Stundiņš (Encyclopedia of Popular Music, Latvia), Katažyna Paluch (Onet.pl, Poland).
- 2008 — Gleb Lisichkin (Play, Russia), Davidas Blyushteyn (Be2gether, Lithuania), Marcin Połeć (Pro-Rock, Poland), Orests Silabriedis (Mūzikas Saule, Latvia), Joy Tartallya (@music, Ukraine).

== Winners of the Experty.by Awards ==
=== By the results of 2017 ===
- Album of the Year — Tonqixod «Колер, якога няма»
- Best Debut Album — Ulyanica «Вясна»
- Best Indie pop/Electronic Album — Аня Жданава «Appetiizer»
- Best Pop Album — ЛСП «Tragic City»
- Best Folk Album — Ulyanica «Вясна»
- Best Rock Album — Tonqixod «Колер, якога няма»
- Best Album in the Belarusian language — Tonqixod «Колер, якога няма»
- People Experts’ Prize — Zero-85 «Turritopsis Nutricula»
- Foreign Expert Prize — ЛСП «Tragic City»
- Expert Staffers’ Prize — Tonqixod «Колер, якога няма»
- Grand Jury's Prize — Tonqixod «Колер, якога няма»

=== By the results of 2016 ===
- Album of the Year — Петля Пристрастия «Мода и облака»
- Best Debut Album — Nebulae Come Sweet «It Is Not The Night That Covers You»
- Best Indie pop/Electronic Album — Shuma «Сонца»
- Best Pop Album — IOWA «Import»
- Best Folk Album — Shuma «Сонца»
- Best Rock Album — Петля Пристрастия «Мода и облака»
- Best Album in the Belarusian language — Lavon Volski «Псіхасаматыка»
- People Experts’ Prize — Lavon Volski «Псіхасаматыка»
- Foreign Expert Prize — Shuma «Сонца»
- Expert Staffers’ Prize — Петля Пристрастия «Мода и облака»
- Grand Jury's Prize — Петля Пристрастия «Мода и облака»

=== By the results of 2015 ===
- Album of the Year — Shuma «Жніво»
- Best Debut Album — NABR «Наша автономная боевая ракета»
- Best Indie pop/Electronic Album — Серебряная свадьба «Музыка — всё!»
- Best Pop Album – not handed
- Best Folk Album — Shuma «Жніво»
- Best Rock Album — Re1ikt «Лекавыя травы»
- Best Album in the Belarusian language — Shuma «Жніво»
- People Experts’ Prize — Re1ikt «Лекавыя травы»
- Foreign Expert Prize — Shuma «Жніво»
- Expert Staffers’ Prize — Re1ikt «Лекавыя травы»
- Grand Jury's Prize — Shuma «Жніво»

=== By the results of 2014 ===
- Album of the Year — Port Mone «Thou»
- Best Debut Album — Tonqixod «Прадмова»
- Best Pop Album — IOWA «Export»
- Best Indie pop/Electronic Album — Mustelide «Secret»
- Best Folk Album — Vuraj «Раёк»
- Best Instrumental Album — Port Mone «Thou»
- Best Rock Album — Tonqixod «Прадмова»
- Best Album in the Belarusian language — Tonqixod «Прадмова»
- People Experts’ Prize — Port Mone «Thou»
- Foreign Expert Prize — (((O))) «Motherland»
- Expert Staffers’ Prize — Tonqixod «Прадмова»
- Grand Jury's Prize — Port Mone «Thou»

=== By the results of 2013 ===
- Album of the Year — Pukstband «Последний альбом»
- Best Debut Album — pafnutiy's Dreams «The Sandman»
- Best Album in the Belarusian language — BosaeSonca «Адпусці»
- Best Pop Album — Макс Корж «Жить в кайф»
- Best Rock Album — Pukstband «Последний альбом»
- Best Folk Album — Kriwi «Traukamurauka»
- Best Instrumental Album — pafnutiy's Dreams «The Sandman»
- People Experts’ Prize — The UNB «Крот-фронт»
- Foreign Expert Prize — (((O))) «Forever I Am»
- Grand Jury's Prize — Pukstband «Последний альбом»
- Expert Staffers’ Prize — pafnutiy's Dreams «The Sandman»

=== By the results of 2012 ===
- Album of the Year — Зміцер Вайцюшкевіч & WZ-Orkiestra «Ваячак»
- Best Debut Album — Clover Club «Random Mood Jukebox»
- Best Folk Album — Палац «Кола грукатала»
- Best Rock Album — Akute «Не існуе»
- Best Album in the Belarusian language — Зміцер Вайцюшкевіч & WZ-Orkiestra «Ваячак»
- People Experts’ Prize — Серебряная свадьба «Laterna Magica»
- Foreign Expert Prize — DakhaBrakha & Port Mone «Хмелева project»
- Grand Jury's Prize — Серебряная свадьба «Laterna Magica»

=== By the results of 2011 ===
- Album of the Year — Троіца «Зімачка»
- Best Debut Album — B_Side «Smooth Season»
- Best Folk Album — Троіца «Зімачка»
- Best Rock Album — Lyapis Trubetskoy «Весёлые картинки»
- Best Album in the Belarusian language — Троіца «Зімачка»
- Best Record Label — Vigma
- People Experts’ Prize — Троіца «Зімачка»
- Foreign Expert Prize — Серебряная свадьба «Сердечная мускулатура»
- Grand Jury's Prize — Троіца «Зімачка»

=== By the results of 2010 ===
- Album of the Year — Дзецідзяцей «Рух»
- Best Debut Album — Pananieba «На балоце»
- Best Folk Album — Hvarna «Кола вяртанняў»
- Best Rock Album — Дзецідзяцей «Рух»
- Best Album in the Belarusian language — Дзецідзяцей «Рух»
- Best Record Label — West Records
- People Experts’ Prize — Hvarna «Кола вяртанняў»
- Foreign Expert Prize — Hvarna «Кола вяртанняў»
- Grand Jury's Prize — Дзецідзяцей «Рух»

=== By the results of 2009 ===
- Album of the Year — The Toobes «Hello»
- Best Debut Album — The Toobes «Hello»
- Best Pop Album — Atlantica «Taboo»
- Best Rock Album — The Toobes «Hello»
- Best Album in the Belarusian language — Глюкі «Idyjatyzm»
- Best Record Label — West Records
- People Experts’ Prize — CherryVata «ViaVanilla»
- Foreign Expert Prize — Port Mone «Dip»
- Grand Jury's Prize — The Toobes «Hello»

=== By the results of 2008 ===
- Album of the Year — Троіца «Сон-трава»
- Best Debut Album — NHS «700»
- Best Folk Album — Троіца «Сон-трава»
- Best Rock Album — Lyapis Trubetskoy «Манифест»
- Best Pop Album — Yadviga Poplavskaya and Alexander Tikhanovich «Любовь-судьба»
- Best Record Label — West Records
- Foreign Expert Prize — Джамбібум «Жавараначкі»
- Grand Jury's Prize — Lyapis Trubetskoy «Манифест»

== Appraisal ==
In 2009, Tat’yana Zamirovskaya as a columnist over at naviny.by evaluated the first results of the project as such, “An attempt to create an Internet portal where every new CD release of Belarusian musicians is reviewed by a completely variegated four of the country’s best music critics, oddly enough, was a success.” She as an author of BelGazeta noted that by 2012 the site’s music awards had become more significant than the “Rock Coronation Awards.” In 2018, Tat’yana Zamirovskaya wrote in the magazine “Russian: Большой” regarding the freezing of the site, “The remaining text base is even more important than remaining music. After all, when we study a period in art, we primarily turn to text, to archives, to documentation. And when something cool ends, we moan in the first place.”

In 2008, Alieh Chamienka, frontman of the band Palats, emphasized the importance of the appearance of this musical resource, since “we all lacked just such objective criticism signed by professional and famous people in musical circles.”

In 2010, beZ bileta’s frontman Vitaly Artist evaluated the portal via Sovetskaya Belorussiya – Belarus' Segodnya like this, “It is good, by the way, that the site experty.by has appeared – there is interesting content and there are its own music awards too.” In a review of all Belarusian music awards for 2013, Paviel Svierdlov, editor of “KYKY.ORG”, noted the peculiarity of presenting the site’s awards that it “takes place in a chamber setting, without a concert and other fuss.”

Music critic and author of the “Encyclopedia of Belarusian Popular Music” Źmicier Padbiarezski put in a review for the Experty.by awards among “the most objective of all Belarusian music awards”.

For the Belarusian Telegraph Agency in 2017, Renato Horvath, co-organizer of the Budapest Showcase Hub festival, positively evaluated the portal’s efforts to promote domestic artists abroad, stating that “over the past few years, thanks to the efforts of the Experty.by project, modern Belarusian music has gained a significant presence in international showcase festivals and conferences.”

Illia Sviryn, chief editor of the newspaper Kultura, assessed the usefulness of the portal in 2017 as follows, “Without a doubt, this project will somehow affect the overall musical situation. New, quite exciting and completely different projects appear, and musicians rake the last denarius out the pockets to make a high-quality recording because they know that it will be evaluated – meticulously and by the Hamburg score. And the audience will learn lots of new things.” Two years before, by evaluating the work of the Port Mone band, he referred to the results of “the most qualified and clear music awards in Belarus,” echoed the opinion of Alexandr Chernuho, editor of Ultra-music.com, who called it the most thorough “in terms of criteria for selecting the strongest releases of the year” in 2012.

In the retrospect of 2010–2019 in 2019, Lesha Gorbash from 34mag called the portal, whose experts “patiently listened to and evaluated all the albums and selected the best of them” for 10 years, the only one who was cataloguing Belarusian music.
