= West Records =

Belarusian record label (e. 1996)

- Founded: 1996
- Founder: Siarhiej Jasiučenia
- Status: inactive
- Genre: various
- Country of origin: Belarus
- Location: Minsk
- Official website: westrecords.by

West Records is a record label in the Republic of Belarus.

== Activity ==
The company is engaged in production and promotion of the releases of Belarusian bands and performers. Many of the most popular Belarusian records of the 2000s, including the domestic tribute to Depeche Mode, albums of J:морс, Тяни-Толкай, Atlantica, Alexey Khlestov, Нестандартный вариант, IQ48, N.R.M., Krambambula, beZ bileta, Hair Peace Salon with Jitters, Open Space, and many others, were released on the label. At the same time, the label aims to present the widest possible range of Belarusian music, from ska to opera, in its catalogue.

West Records is also a distributor of world-famous labels, such as Sony BMG, Universal, EMI, across the territory of Belarus. The company distributes the licensed products of all major Russian companies, including Мистерия звука, Монолит, Мегалайнер, CD Land, Никитин, and many others.

As Belorusskaya Gazeta’s Jeliena Ankudo reported in 2003, the State Control Committee of the Republic of Belarus imposed a fine of more than $600000 on the company for violations in its financial and economic activities.

In 2010 the label together with the portal TUT.BY produced the show «Russian: Шоу Лауринаса и Мусиэгле» with the participation of Belarusian show business personalities.

== Recognition ==
According to the presented results of the editorial awards by the music portal Experty.by, West Records was named the best record label of the year three times in a row (in 2008, 2009 and 2010).

In 2010 Oleg Klimov, ex-chief editor of Muzykalnaya Gazeta, as a columnist over at naviny.by named the label, in whose catalogue mediocre albums are rare, “outstanding.”
