= Pesniary =

Soviet Belarusian folk rock band

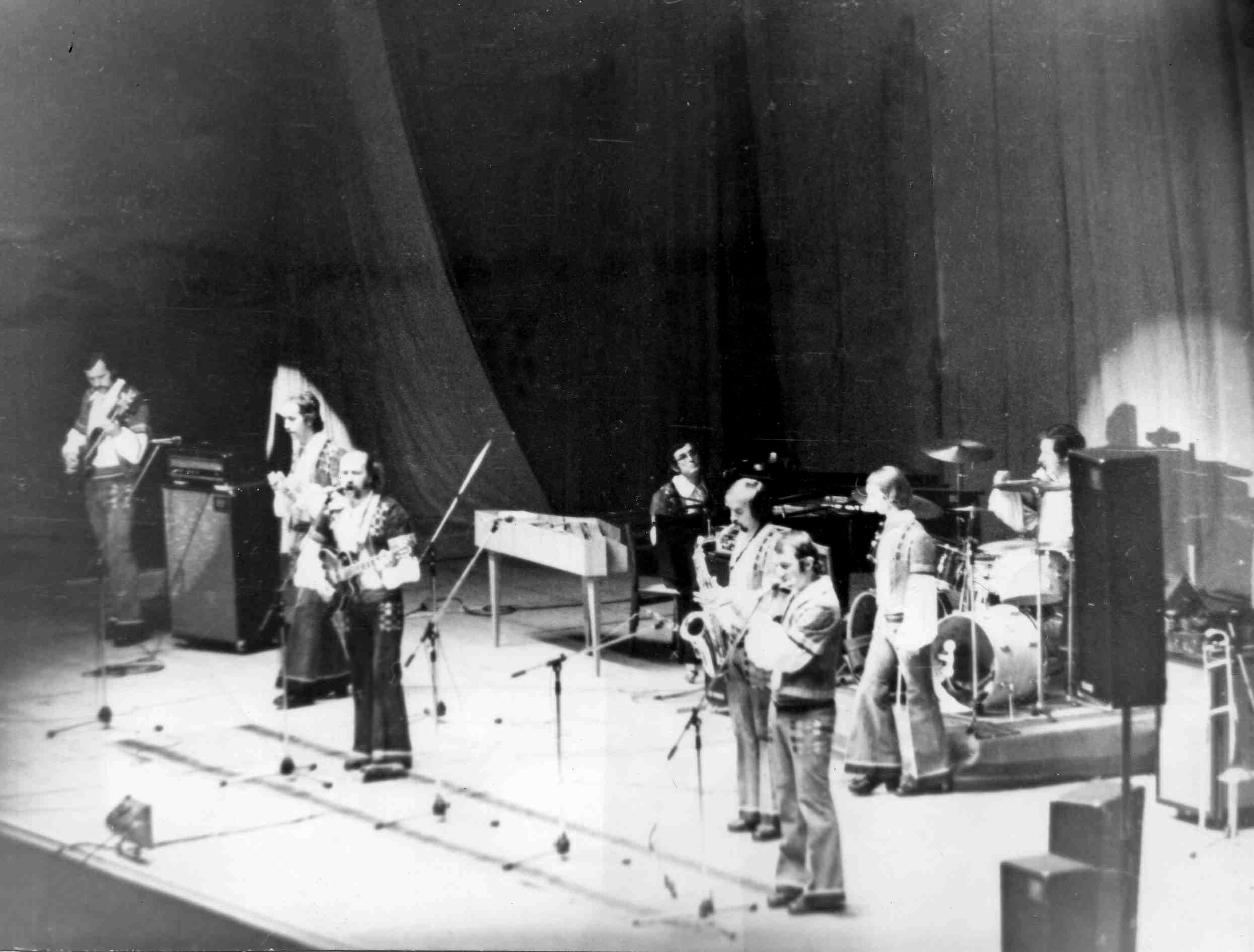
- Pesniary performing in Yaroslavl, 1974

Background information
- Origin: Minsk, Byelorussian SSR, Soviet Union (Now Minsk, Belarus)
- Genres: Folk; folk rock; folk-pop; progressive rock; psychedelic rock; psychedelic pop
- Years active: 1969–2003
- Labels: Melodiya, Boheme Music, Media Star
- Past members: List: Vladimir Mulyavin; Vladimir Misevich; Anatoly Kasheparov; Alexandr Demeshko; Leonid Tyshko; Leonid Bortkevich; Valery Yashkin; Valery Mulyavin; Valentin Bad'yarov; Valeriy Gurdizyane; Ivan Krylov; Сheslav-Viktor Poplavsky; Vladimir Nikolaev; Anatoly Gilevich; Yuriy Denisov; Ludmila Isupova; Ludmila Medvedko; Oktai Aivazov; Marc Shmelkin; Vyacheslav Mihnovich; Valery Dayneko; Yevgeniy Pozdyshev; Vladimir Tkachenko; Igor Palivoda; Igor Penya; Sergey Laptashov; Arkadiy Eskin; Boris Bernshteyn; Vladimir Belyaev; Vladimir Kudrin; Yuri Lukashevich; Alexander Rostopchin; Mikhail Kulʹkov; Oleg Martakov; Dmitry Yavtuhovich; Valeriy Golovko; Eduard Tyshko; Alexander Vislavskiy; Leonid Kovalev; Oleg Molchan; Nicholay Neronskiy; Alexander Moskalchuk; Vyacheslav Bulda; Aleksandr Katikov; Vladimir Marusich; Oleg Averin "Kozlovich"; Victor Molchanov; Arkadiy Ivanovskiy

Pesniary (also spelled Pesnyary, Belarusian: Песняры, [pʲesʲnʲaˈrɨ]) was a popular Soviet Belarusian folk rock VIA. It was founded in 1969 by guitarist Vladimir Mulyavin. Before 1970, the band was known under the name Liavony (Лявоны).

== Style ==
Pesniary combined various types of music, but mostly Belarusian folklore though often with various rock elements and later rock as well. Several of Pesniary's songs were composed by Aleksandra Pakhmutova. The surprising influence of early Frank Zappa was also notable.

== Biography ==
In 1973, the band participated in Soviet television film "This Merry Planet".

Pesniary was one of the very few Soviet bands (and possibly the first one) to tour in the United States in 1976. They toured the American South with folk band The New Christy Minstrels.

After Mulyavin's death in a car accident on 26 January 2003, the original Pesniary split. Five different bands claimed to be the official descendants of Pesniary, touring and performing original Pesniary songs. These are:

- Belarusian State Ensemble Pesniary – a state-produced band under the Ministry of Culture of Belarus, consisting mostly of young musicians.
- Belorusskie Pesniary – led by former Pesniary saxophonist Uladzislau Misevich.
- Bortkevich's Pesniary – led by former Pesniary vocalist Leanid Bortkevich.
- Svechkin's Pesniary – led by former administrator of Pesniary Igor Svechkin, split from Bortkevich's Pesniary in 2004.
- Liavony – a band which split from Bortkevich’s Pesniary in 2008, consisted of young musicians, none of whom participated in Pesniary until 1998.
- Until 2006, the Liavony-Pesniary ensemble existed under the direction of the classical line-up drummer Alexander Demeshko. The band broke up in 2006 after his death.

== Discography ==
Year	Album	Transliteration	Meaning
1971	Ты мне вясною прыснiлася	Ty mnie viasnoju prysnilasia	I dreamt of you in spring
1974	Алеся	Aliesia	Alesya
1977	Перапёлачка	Pierapiolachka	The Quail
1979	Волoгда	Vologda	Vologda
1980	Гусляр	Husliar	Guslar
1982	Зачарованная моя	Zacharovannaya maya	My Enchanted (live album)
1984	Через всю войну	Cherez vsyu voynu	Throughout the Whole War

The band also released dozens of singles.

== Lineup ==
The lineup of the band changed frequently. Among the most notable and long-lived band members were:

- Lyudmila Isupova (vocals, flute,1975–1979)
- Vladimir Mulyavin (guitar, vocals,1968–2003)
- Valery Mulyavin (guitar, trumpet, 1968–1973)
- Leonid Bortkevich (vocals, 1969–1980)
- Anatoly Kasheparov (vocals, 1970–1990)
- Valery Dayneka (vocals, alto, 1976–1992)
- Igor Penya (vocals, 1980–1998)
- Leonid Tyshko (bass guitar, 1968–1981)
- Vladislav Misevich (saxophone, flute, 1968–1992)
- Alexander Demeshko (drums, 1968–1988)
- Valery Yashkin (keyboards, hurdy-gurdy, 1968–1977)
- Vladimir Nikolayev (keyboards, trombone, 1971–1980)
- Cheslav Poplavsky (violin, guitar, 1972–1979)

== See also ==
- Soviet music
- Belarusian music
