= Capital TV (Belarus) =

National television network in Belarus

Capital Television (STV) Сталічнае тэлебачанне (СТБ) Сталічнае тэлебачанне
- Logo used since 2018.
- Country: Belarus
- Headquarters: Minsk, Belarus

Programming
- Languages: Belarusian, Russian

History
- Launched: 1 January 2001; 25 years ago

Links
- Website: ctv.by

Availability

Terrestrial
- DVB-T: MUX 1 (3)

Capital Television (STV) (Belarusian: СТБ (Сталічнае тэлебачанне)) is a state-owned TV channel in Belarus covering the whole country.

The corresponding closed joint-stock company "Russian: Столичное телевидение" was registered on October 19, 2000, and its first broadcast was on January 1, 2001. Initially it covered only the news from the capital city of Minsk, since 2005, the coverage includes the whole country.

In December 2009, the channel aired The Theorists, a shot-for-shot clone of The Big Bang Theory. Weeks after the initial airing, Chuck Lorre addressed the issue in one of his vanity plates, where it was revealed that the series was sent to Warner Bros. Television's legal department, whose officials states that suing for copyright infringement in Belarus was impossible. STV ceased airing the series after just four episodes on air.

Since October 2017 STV started broadcasting in HDTV format.

Its YouTube channel was terminated on April 3, 2026, likely following that previous day's edition of Without Cover posted on its channel. A subsequent attempt, CTVPLUS, was also taken down on April 8.
