= Drezden (album) =

Studio album by Drezden
- Released: August 30, 2018
- Recorded: 2018
- Genre: Synth-pop, Krautrock, new wave, cyberpunk
- Length: 39:17
- Label: Soyuz Music
- Producer: Vitaliy Telezin

Drezden chronology
Drezden (2018)	Edelweiss (2019)

Singles from Drezden
- 1. "Drezden" Released: August 30, 2018; 2. "Ронин" Released: December 3, 2018; 3. "Айсберг" Released: March 26, 2019; 4. "Коалы" Released: May 14, 2019

Professional ratings
Review scores
Source	Rating
InterMedia	3.0/5 stars
The Village	neutral
KM.RU	neutral

Drezden is the first studio album by the Belarusian electronic music band Drezden, released on August 31, 2018. The CD contains 11 tracks recorded in 2018. All songs were written by Siarhei Mikhalok.

== History and release ==
On February 19, 2018, information appeared that Siarhei Mikhalok was organizing a new electronic project for which he had already assembled an international band bolstered up with guitarist Vladimir Opsenica from Okean Elzy. The release of the first album of the new project was scheduled for September 2018. According to Mikhalok, he was always a fan of new wave in general and the German new wave in particular. He said that he listened to New Order, Front 242, The KLF, Nena and Joachim Witt, and while attending Laibach and Nitzer Ebb concerts, he dreamed of the organizing of his electronic band.

The upcoming debut album received the title Drezden, since Siarhei was born in Dresden, Germany, in 1972. By style, the music was supposed to be an "eclectic fusion" of The Cure, Wolfsheim, and Russian musician Alexei Veeshnya, while the lyrics were going to be sort of an allusion to the works of Mikhalok's favorite writers: Philip K. Dick, William Gibson, and Bruce Sterling. The band members identified its genre as "New Belorussia Welle" and "post-Soviet-cyber-punk."

The album was released online on August 31, 2018. On the same day, an official video for the title track of the album appeared on YouTube. The clip was shot by Kiev director Alexander Stekolenko. On December 3 an official video for the song "Ронин" directed by Ukrainian photographer Sergey Sarakhanov was released. According to him, it would be difficult to make a story about medieval Japan, so it was decided to move along the path of metaphor. The video was shot against the backdrop of Ukrainian nature in Aktove canyon.

On March 26, 2019, the third music video came. This time the video was shot for the song "Айсберг." The director was the Minsk designer Arthur Vakarov. In the video, the head of Siarhei Mikhalok, which is an iceberg, drifts in the ocean along multi-colored waves. On May 14, a video for the song "Коалы" shot by Karolina Polyakova was released. In the clip, the middle-aged man studies a box with his memories.

== Reception ==
Russian music journalist Alexei Mazhaev from InterMedia praised the music that evokes feelings of nostalgia for electronic music of the 80's, but Mikhalok's vocals, in his opinion, does not match it. He blamed the timbre of the vocalist's voice, which, in his opinion, is not suitable for electronic music. As to some lyrics, he also suggested that they would be more suitable for his Lyapis Trubetskoy and Brutto rock bands themselves.

Conrad Erofeev from The Village heard Krautrock and new wave tunes on the album and pointed out the seriousness of the lyrics that leaves a theatrical impression though, while these experiments with music just highlight Mikhalok's creativity crisis, according to the author of the review.

In his review piece over at Km.ru, Denis Stupnikov described the album as a mix between synth-pop and the German industrial music, the lyrics of which have serious as well as ludicrous motifs, and echoed Conrad Erofeev's take stating that Siarhei Mikhalok faced sort of a midlife crisis.

In the review for the magazine Russian: Большой, Taciana Zamiroŭskaja came to the conclusion that the “kind and soft” CD is “closest to the „Russian: Весёлые картинки“ (English: Funny Pictures) album, the most piercing Lyapis Trubetskoy’s work, directly indicating what kind of music Siarhei wants to play.”

== Track listing ==
No.	Title	Lyrics	Music	Length
1.	"Drezden"	Siarhei Mikhalok	Siarhei Mikhalok	3:33
2.	"Айсберг"	Siarhei Mikhalok	Siarhei Mikhalok	3:48
3.	"Самарканд"	Siarhei Mikhalok	Siarhei Mikhalok	3:02
4.	"Ямагути-гуми"	Siarhei Mikhalok	Siarhei Mikhalok	3:38
5.	"Ронин"	Siarhei Mikhalok	Siarhei Mikhalok	3:30
6.	"Коалы"	Siarhei Mikhalok	Siarhei Mikhalok	3:28
7.	"Электро-монголы"	Siarhei Mikhalok	Siarhei Mikhalok	3:44
8.	"Стальной Нуриев"	Siarhei Mikhalok	Siarhei Mikhalok	3:12
9.	"Вуди Вудпекер"	Siarhei Mikhalok	Siarhei Mikhalok	3:24
10.	"Мона Лиза овердрайв"	Siarhei Mikhalok	Siarhei Mikhalok	4:04
11.	"Король"	Siarhei Mikhalok	Siarhei Mikhalok	3:53

== Personnel ==
Drezden:

- Siarhei Mikhalok – vocals.
- Vladimir Opsenica — guitars, keyboards.

Production:

- Vitaliy Telezin – sound producer.
