= Drezden (band) =

- Origin: Minsk, Belarus
- Genres: Electronic, new wave, synth-pop, Krautrock, cyberpunk
- Years active: 2018–present
- Label: Soyuz Music
- Members: Siarhei Mikhalok, Vladimir Opsenica
- Website: drezden.by

Drezden is a Belarusian and Ukrainian electronic band founded by Siarhei Mikhalok.

== History ==
On February 19, 2018, information appeared that Sergey Mikhalok, the leader of Brutto and several other bands, was organizing a new electronic project, for the formation of the core of which he had already enlisted the support of Okean Elzy guitarist Vladimir Opsenica and producer Vitaly Telezin. According to Mikhalok, he was always a fan of new wave, the German new wave in particular, and concealed the dream of creating his own band in this genre.

Together with the announcement of the creation of the band, work began on the band's self-titled debut album, which was released on August 30, 2018, on the label Soyuz Music. On the same day, a music video was released for the title track of the disc “Drezden.”

The album Drezden itself received a mixed press, while critics could not get rid of obsessive musical and stylistic associations with other Mikhalok’s projects: Brutto, Lyapis Trubetskoy, Lyapis-98. In total, 4 singles were released from the record (“Drezden,” “Ронин,” “Айсберг,” “Коалы”), for all of which music videos were shot.

Simultaneously with the release of the debut album, it was announced that the band had already begun recording the second one. In the fall of 2018, keyboardist Pavel Mikhalok (Siarhei Mikhalok's son and member of Super Besse), bassist Ales Myshkevich, known for playing in Lyapis-98, J:Mors, beZ bileta, Krambambula, guitarist Pavel Velichko from Yellow Brick Road, and beZ bileta's drummer Denis Shurov, who had already collaborated with Mikhalok in the bands: Brutto, Lyapis-98, and Lyapis Trubetskoy, bolstered up the band's lineup.

The remaining musicians of a concert tour, which is scheduled to roll on in the fall of 2019, will become known later.

== The band's name ==
The name of the band comes from the Russian pronunciation of the name of the city of Dresden, Germany, in which frontman Sergei Mikhalok was born in 1972.

== Discography ==
=== Studio albums ===
- Drezden (August 30, 2018)
- Edelweiss (December 3, 2019)

=== Singles ===
- "Drezden" (August 30, 2018)
- "Ронин" (December 3, 2018)
- "Айсберг" (March 29, 2019)
- "Коалы" (May 3, 2019)

=== Official music videos ===
- Drezden (August 30, 2018)
- Ронин (December 3, 2018)
- Айсберг (March 29, 2019)
- Коалы (May 3, 2019)
- Эдельвейс (November 14, 2019)
- Давида олень (May 19, 2020)
- Barrikado (December 18, 2020)
- Гильотина (September 1, 2021)
- Молодость и радость (February 18, 2022)

== Band members ==
- Siarhei Mikhalok — vocals (2018 –)
- Vladimir Opsenica – guitar, keyboards (2018 –)

Tour members

- Pavel Mikhalok — keyboards (2018 – )
- Ales Myshkevich — bass (2018 –)
- Pavel Velichko — guitar (2018 –)
- Denis Shurov – drums (2018 –)

Production

- Vitaly Telezin — sound-producer (2018 –)
