= Underdog (Brutto album) =

Studio album by Brutto
- Released: May 12, 2014
- Genre: Punk rock
- Length: 36:21
- Label: Self-released

Singles from Underdog
- 1. "BRUTTO" Released: September 1, 2014; 2. "Underdog" Released: September 9, 2014

Professional ratings
Review scores
Source	Rating
Experty.by	5/10 stars
InterMedia	3/5 stars

Underdog is the first studio album by Belarusian rock band Brutto, released on September 12, 2014.

== History ==
Work on the album took place at the American studio Sterling Sound NYC. Ted Jensen was in charge of mastering, and Andrei Bobrovka recorded the sound. Before the release of the album, two official singles were released: "Brutto" and "Underdog". The album was officially released on September 12, 2014, without announcements or press releases.

== Track listing ==
No.	Title	Length
1.	"Brutto"	4:00
2.	"Underdog"	2:32
3.	"Гири"	2:24
4.	"Наша возьме"	1:53
5.	"Веселей"	1:54
6.	"Мяч"	3:15
7.	"I Get Wet" (cover of Andrew W.K.)	4:49
8.	"Гарэза"	2:54
9.	"Регби"	2:07
10.	"The Chauffeur" (cover of Duran Duran)	3:48
11.	"Дворняги"	3:22
12.	"Труд"	3:24

== Reception ==
The album was received rather coolly by music critics.

== Personnel ==
- Siarhei Mikhalok — vocals
- Vitaly Gurkov — vocals
- Denys Sturchenko – bass guitar
- Denys Shurov – drums
