= Krambambula =

Krambambula may refer to:

- Krambambula (drink)
- Krambambula (band)
