= Edelweiss (Drezden album) =

Studio album by Drezden
- Released: December 3, 2019
- Recorded: 2019
- Genre: Synth-pop, Alternative rock, New wave music
- Length: 42:08
- Label: Soyuz Music
- Producer: Vitaliy Telezin

Drezden chronology
| Drezden (2018) | Edelweiss (2019) |

Singles from Edelweiss
- 1. "Edelweiss" Released: November 14, 2019; 2. "Davida Olen" Released: May 19, 2020

Professional ratings
Review scores
| Source | Rating |
|---|---|
| InterMedia | 7.0/10 stars |

Edelweiss is the second studio album by the Belarusian electronic music band Drezden, released on December 3, 2019. The CD contains 11 tracks recorded in 2019. All songs were written by Siarhei Mikhalok.

== History and release ==
On November 14, 2019, the public was presented with a video clip for the song "Edelweiss", the title song from the upcoming new album of the same name. The author of the video is the Minsk photographer Karolina Polyakova. The video was filmed by the wife of Siarhei Mikhalok, actress Svetlana Zelenkovskaya.

Album Edelweiss was released on December 3. The new album includes 11 tracks. Mixing and mastering was done by Vitaly Telezin. The album was recorded at his Kyiv studio "211". The new album continues the tradition of the first. It is filled with puns and philosophical texts. The group was joined by Mikhalok's son Pavel, who plays keyboards.

On January 19, 2020, on the birthday of Siarhei Mikhalok, the first live performance of the Drezden group took place in Lviv. Although the group appeared back in 2018, until that moment it existed only on the Internet. On February 23, the group gave a concert in Minsk. The concert featured songs from both albums. On February 28, the group was presented in Kyiv. The concert in Kharkiv scheduled for March 13 was canceled due to the outbreak of the coronavirus pandemic.

On May 19, a video clip for the song "David's Deer" appeared. This video is made in a futuristic style and refers to old Hollywood movies. A large international team worked on the clip, and Vladimir Nefyodov was the director. Filming took place over two days in and around Los Angeles.

== Reception ==
Alexey Mazhaev from the InterMedia website notes that "the density of references, associations, historical, mythological, literary and cinematic characters is unusually high in the album." In his opinion, this is where the problem lies, since lovers of such music "prefer abstract images in poetry rather than philosophical terms and references to history and mythology." Mazhaev rated the album 7 points out of 10.

== Track listing ==
All tracks are written by Siarhei Mikhalok

Edelweiss track listing
| No. | Title | Length |
|---|---|---|
| 1. | "Эдельвейс" (Edelweiss) | 4:07 |
| 2. | "Давида олень" (David's Deer) | 2:52 |
| 3. | "О'Хенри" (O'Henry) | 4:28 |
| 4. | "Алладин" (Aladdin) | 3:21 |
| 5. | "Голливуд" (Hollywood) | 4:44 |
| 6. | "Весельчак У" (Humorist U) | 4:05 |
| 7. | "Колесо Калипсо" (Wheel of Calypso) | 4:11 |
| 8. | "Стальная Аляска" (Steel Alaska) | 3:35 |
| 9. | "Мутабор" (Mutabor) | 3:18 |
| 10. | "Повелитель мух" (Lord of the Flies) | 3:11 |
| 11. | "Оле Лукойе" (Ole Lukkoye) | 4:16 |
| Total length: | | 42:08 |

== Personnel ==
Drezden:

- Siarhei Mikhalok – vocals.
- Pavel Mikhalok — keyboards.
- Ales-Frantzishak Myshkevich – bass-guitar.
- Pavel Wialichka – guitar.
- Dzianis Shurau – percussion.

Production:

- Vitaliy Telezin – producer, recording, mastering.
