= Music industry of Russia =

The music industry or the music business or the music market of Russia is a part of the Russian economy and social life, uniting companies and citizens who earn money through the creation and sale of musical works. The music industry is an integral part of a broader sector of the economy - the entertainment industry in Russia, which also includes the film industry, fashion, the computer games industry, television, radio, bookselling, gambling, etc.

The music business involves a large number of people and organizations: musicians who create and perform musical works; companies and professionals engaged in the recording and sale of music (including producers, recording studios, sound engineers, labels, music stores and collective rights management organizations); tour organizers (booking managers, promoters, concert venues); television and radio networks operating in a musical format (music television, music radio stations); music journalists and critics; musical instrument manufacturers and many others.

According to the InterMedia information agency, the Russian music market, including pirated content, is estimated at $3.5 billion and is among the ten largest markets in the world in terms of the number of legally sold copies of musical products. About 2.7 thousand artists and bands work in the Russian Federation, whose audience worldwide is 300 million Russian speakers. In Russia itself, there are 28 million active consumers of music products. The main center for creating popular Russian-language music is Moscow, and to a lesser extent, Saint Petersburg. Sales markets are also post-Soviet countries, including Ukraine and Belarus. Kyiv is a significant center for the production and consumption of Russian-language music.

== Sources ==
- Евгений Сафронов, Александр Тихонов. (2011). "Музыкальная индустрия России на изломе десятилетий" (PDF). Российский музыкальный ежегодник'11. Москва: Intermedia. pp. 13–34.
- Евгений Сафронов, Александр Тихонов. (2013). "Музыкальная индустрия России на изломе десятилетий" (PDF). Российский музыкальный ежегодник'13. Москва: Intermedia. pp. 13–34.
