= Kalykhanka =

Kalykhanka (Belarusian: Калыханка, "Lullaby") may refer to:

- Kalykhanka (TV program) weeknight children's program of Belteleradio, Belarus
- Kalykhanka, Comedy sketch series by Belarusian comic duo Sasha and Sirozha
