= Russian Doll =

A Russian doll (or Matryoshka) is a type of nested, wooden toy.

Russian Doll or Russian Dolls may also refer to:

== Television series ==
- Russian Doll (TV series), a 2019 American drama series on Netflix
- Russian Dolls (2011 TV series), a 2011 American reality series on Lifetime
- Russian Dolls: Sex Trade (Dutch: Matroesjka's), a 2005 Flemish drama series

== Other uses ==
- Russian Doll (film), a 2001 Australian comedy film
- Russian Dolls (film) (French: Les Poupées russes), a 2006 French-British comedy-drama film
- "Russian Dolls", a song from Nicolas Jaar's EP Russian Dolls

== See also ==
- Matryoshka (disambiguation)
