= Krambambula (band) =

Belarusian rock band

Krambambula Крамбамбуля
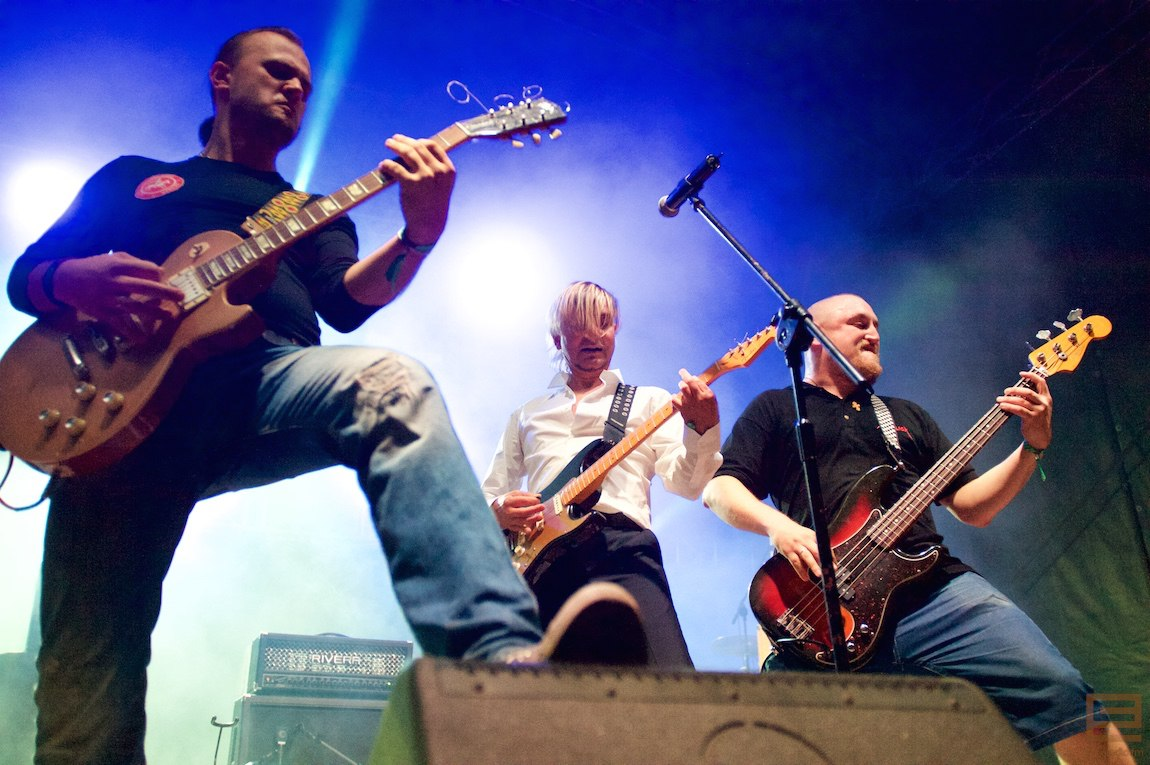
- Krambambula in 2016 (Pavel Triput, Lavon Volski and Ales Myshkevich)

Background information
- Origin: Minsk, Belarus
- Genres: Pop rock
- Years active: 2001–present
- Labels: West Records, Go Records, Vigma, Pyarshak
- Members: Lavon Volski; Ales Myshkevich; Pavel Arakelyan; Andrey Yakubchik; Pavel Mamonov; Pavel Triput

Krambambula is a Belarusian band from Minsk, started by Lavon Volski (also the founder of N.R.M.) in 2001. The name of the band is derived from a popular Belarusian alcoholic tincture of the same name. The band performs humorous and satirical songs, often on an alcoholic theme. Krambambula was banned in Belarus from 2011 to 2017.

== History ==
=== Emergence of the idea ===
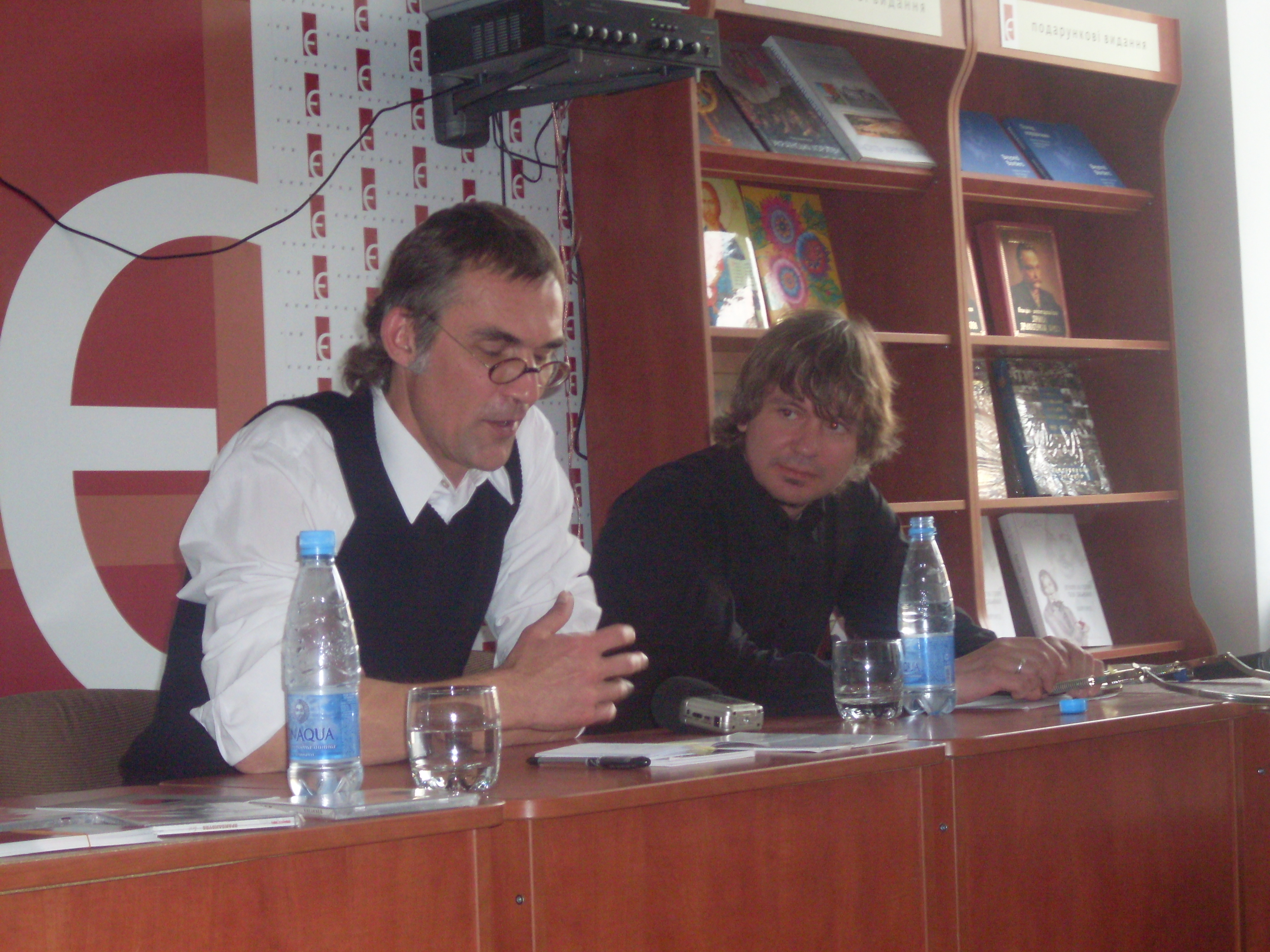
Mikhail Anempodistov and Lavon Volski in Lviv, 2009

In the second half of the 90s the artist and poet Mikhail Anempodistov came up with the concept of the album Narodny Albom (English: Folk Album). The Belarusian rock stars of that time were supposed to take part in this project. The album was dedicated to Western Belarus interwar period. Lavon Volski, the leader of the musical band N.R.M., was also invited into this project. He was involved in the arrangements and sang most of the songs there. Lavon sang in an unusual for himself manner, as the album songs were made in a folk style. After the completion of this project Volski still had many ideas for such kind of comic songs, but he couldn’t record them with his N.R.M. band, as they did not fit the serious style of it. Then Lavon Volski had an idea to create a new band, whose music would be solely entertaining and would not concern politics. Very soon Volski was surrounded by like-minded people. Musicians from different Belarusian groups expressed their desire to play in Volski's new project. A new band was named "Krambambula", in honor of the ancient Belarusian liqueur infused on honey and spices, which name in its turn refers to the German liqueur of Krambambuli. The producer and manager of the group was Lavon's wife Anna Volskaya.

=== 2002-2004. Successful start ===
Krambambula band began to prepare its first album. It was decided to devote it completely to the alcoholic beverages from different countries. One of the songs, for example, was about whiskey and parodied country music, the other was about the Soviet champagne and imitated the sound of the Soviet VIA of the 70s, and so on. The debut album Zastolny albom (Belarusian: Застольны альбом) was released in the middle of May of 2002 and became the best-selling Belarusian album of the year, and the song "Absinthe" (Belarusian: Абсэнт) became a hit (this song was made in a French style). At the same time this album puzzled Lavon Volski’s fans, as they didn’t expect to get a pop-rock album from him. At the "Rock Coronation-2002" music award show Krambambula won in three categories ("Artist of the Year", "Album of the Year" and "Song of the Year").

As their next work the band planned to record a maxi-single made from four songs. To record track "Old hippies" (Belarusian: Старыя хіпаны) it was decided to invite Siarhei Mikhalok from Lyapis Trubetskoy band, as the musicians felt that this song suited him in style very well. Siarhei Mikhalok agreed to cooperate with Krambambula and also brought some of his songs into the project. Thus, the work on a full album recording began. In the band of Krambambula Siarhei Mikhalok had to sing in the Belarusian language. According to Siarhei, he began to insert Belarusian-language songs in the albums of his Lyapis Trubetskoy band precisely under the influence of work with Lavon Volski. Alexander Kulinkovich from the band Neuro Dubel also joined Krambambula and recorded one song with it. The album Karalі rayonu (Belarusian: Каралі раёну) was released in the middle of the summer of 2003. The song "Guests" (Belarusian: Госці), recorded in a duet with Siarhei Mikhalok, became very popular. Even now it is considered to be the most famous hit of the band. Belarusian sportsmen participated in the shooting of the video for this song: cyclist Natallia Tsylinskaya, swimmer Aliaksandra Herasimenia, football players Alyaksandr Khatskevich, Alexander Hleb and Gennady Tumilovich.

Lavon Volski had some ideas about what to do next. He planned to record two new albums. One album was supposed to be international and contain songs in different languages. Another album was to consist of songs dedicated to various holidays. Before these two albums, it was decided to release a maxi-single consisting of four songs that would precede the future albums. However, during the work on the single a lot of new material was accumulated. Thus, it was decided to record a full album. The album Radio Krambambula 0,33 FM (Belarusian: Радыё Крамбамбуля 0,33 FM) was released in 2004. Siarhei Mikhalok and Alexander Kulinkovich joined Krambambula at that time again. Gunesh Abasova (Azerbaijani: Günəş Abbasova), a Belarusian singer of Azerbaijan origin, took part in the recording. Another guest star was the Ukrainian musician Kuzma Skryabin from the band Skryabin. He recorded song "Neighbours" (Belarusian: Суседзі) in a duet with Volski. The text in this song is in two languages: Ukrainian and Belarusian. Kuzma Scriabin himself expressed a desire to sing the Belarusian text, and Lavon Volski was offered to sing the Ukrainian text. The song "Tourists" (Belarusian: Турысты), recorded in a duet with Siarhei Mikhalok, became this album’s hit.

During the Orange Revolution in Ukraine, in the early December of 2004, Lavon Volski with two of his bands (N.R.M. and Krambambula) went to Kyiv to support the protesters. Krambambulya band performed in front of two hundred thousand people at Maidan Nezalezhnosti.

Thus, for the first 2,5 years of its existence Krambambula band released three albums with three full-fledged hits.

=== 2005-2014. Festive and international albums. The ban of the band ===
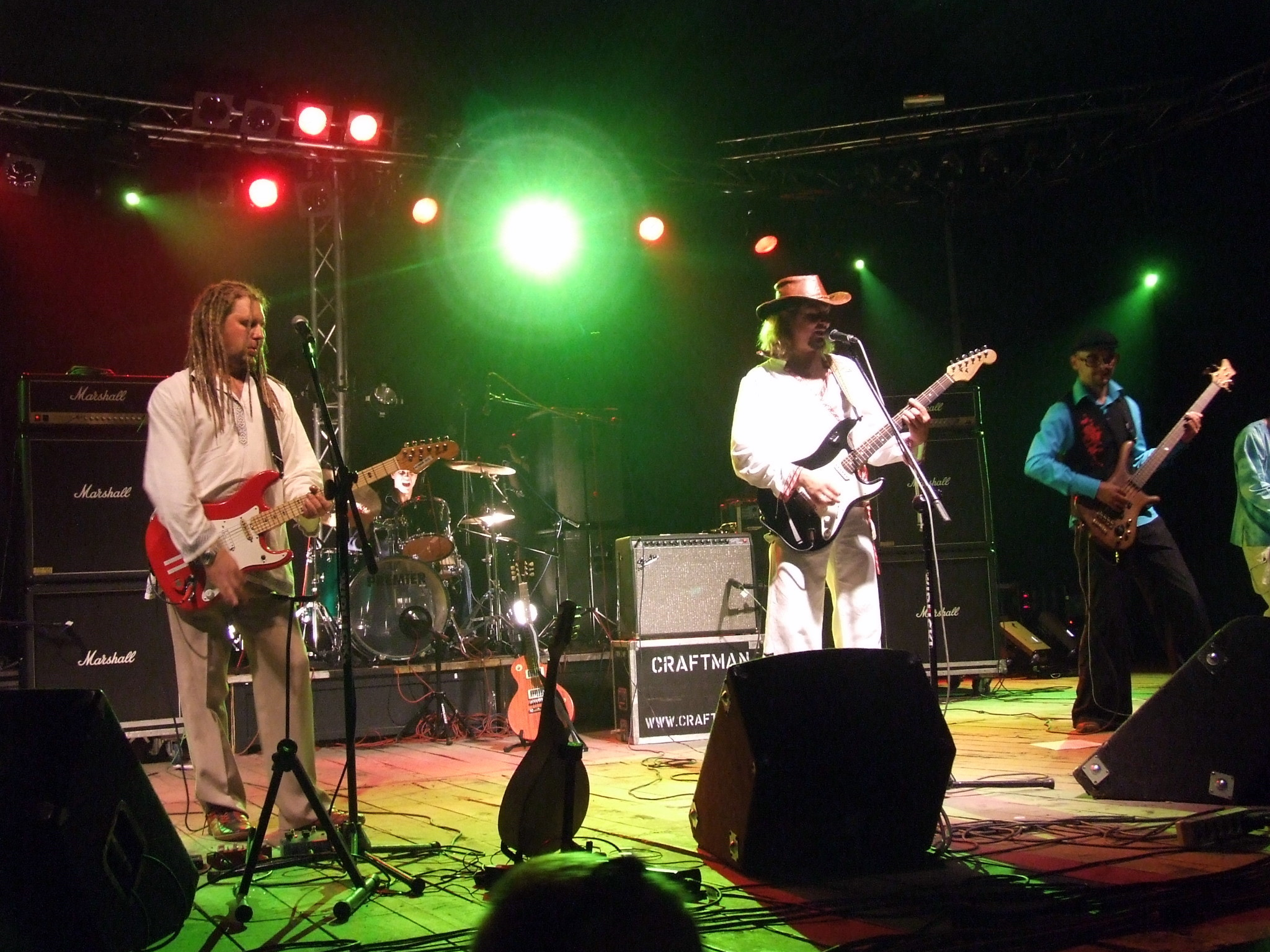
Krambambula at "Basowiszcza-2007"

Fans had to wait for another 2,5 years for the next album. In May 2007 a new album Svyatochnaya (Belarusian: Сьвяточная) was released, it was devoted to the holidays (religious, state and secular). Some of the songs have been dedicated to the exotic for Belarus holidays such as St. Patrick's Day and Halloween. At the same time a collection of the best songs of the band named The Best albo Belarusian Disco was released in honor of its five-year jubilee. The presentation of the albums took place in the restaurant "Sovietsky" and was decorated in "Era of Stagnation" style. The new album included also some protest notes. In the song dedicated to the anniversary of the October Revolution Lenin, Stalin and Dzerzhinsky were mentioned as those who "had bothered". At the end of that year the band released the single "Dolce Vita", that was recorded in the style of the first albums.

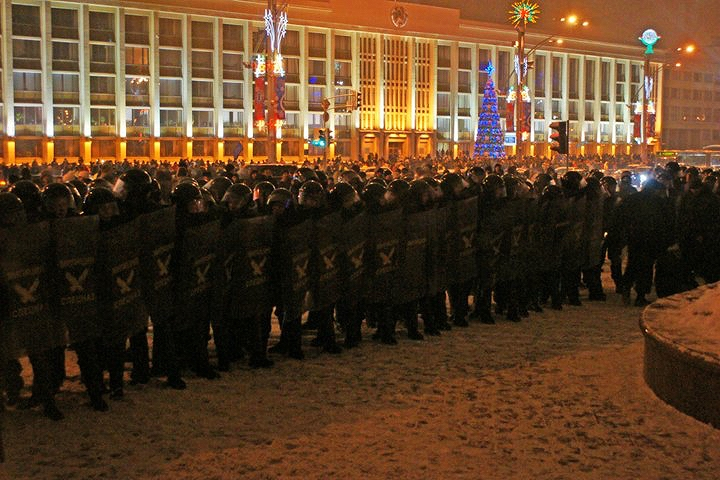
Special Purpose Police Unit in the center of Minsk (December 19, 2010)

A three-year break followed. Only at the end of the summer of 2010 the band of Krambambula released a new single "One-Two-Three - everybody at the table!" (Belarusian: Раз-два-тры — усе за стол!). At that time, the musicians of the band were updated. Lavon Volski began to plan the recording of a new album. Belarusian folk songs, recorded in a modern style, were to be included in that album. Later came the idea to record a collection of European folk songs sung in the Belarusian language. Then that idea was complicated by Volski's desire to record the same songs in the original languages. During the work on the album on December 19, 2010 presidential elections took place in Belarus, in which Alexander Lukashenko won once again. The elections ended in protests and numerous detentions. The cultural figures, who expressed their support for political prisoners, were included in the secret "black list". Among the musicians who got in the "black list" were: Lyapis Trubetskoy, Palac, Krama, Neuro Dubel, Naka, Zmicier Vajciuskievic and Lavon Volski’s bands (N.R.M. and Krambambula). The planned concerts were canceled and new concerts were banned. It was the first ban for Krambambula when N.R.M. was already banned once from 2004 to 2007.

The international album Drabadzi-drabada was released at the end of 2011. The album consisted of two discs. European folk songs performed in the Belarusian language were collected on the first disc. The second disc contained the same songs sung in the original language. In total this album was recorded in 10 languages: Croatian, French, German, Swedish, Italian and others. Among other things, there was also a cover version of the famous Irish folk song "Whiskey in the Jar" on the disk. Due to the impossibility for the group to perform in Belarus the presentation of this album took place in Vilnius. The Embassy of Lithuania made advances to the Belarusian band fans and issued free visas to their country when they presented a ticket for this concert. The embassy has begun to hold to this practice for all the following events, when large Belarusian concerts are held in Lithuania.

=== 2015–until today. Chyrvony shtral ===
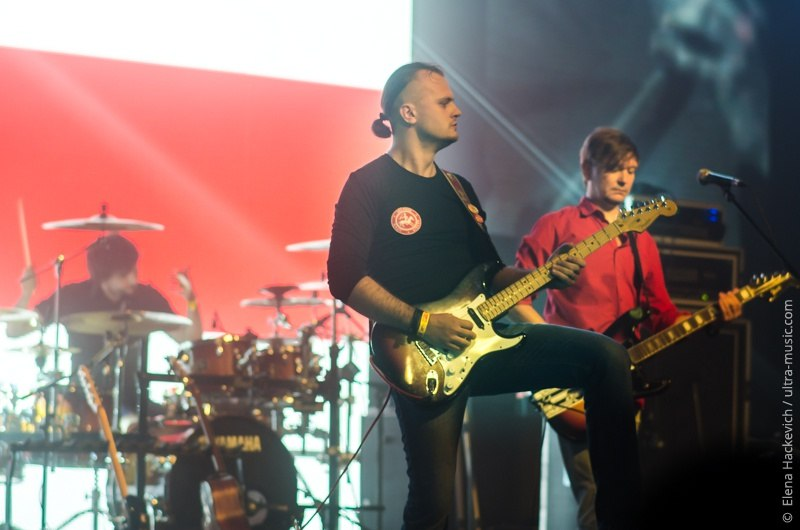
Krambambula in 2015

In 2015, after a long lull, the band released a new album called Chyrvony shtral (Belarusian: Чырвоны штраль). The album was dedicated to partisan theme. The music in this album became more serious. Music critics unanimously agreed that this is the best album recorded by the band of Krambambula. However, Lavon Volski said that this album would be a farewell. He said that "the group is going to the forests and will be engaged in guerrilla activity, as it does not see any other variant of its existence in the modern conditions". Among other things, that album included a cover version of the song "Partisan song" (Belarusian: Партызанская) of the band N.R.M. (that song was the first big hit of N.R.M.). The Belarusian version of Bob Marley's song "I Shot the Sheriff" was also included in the album. It was called "I shot a militiaman" (Belarusian: Я страляў у міліцыянта). In March 2016 Anna Volskaya, wife of Lavon Volski and the manager of Krambambula band, died of cancer.

On May 31, 2017, at the restaurant-brewery "Friends" in Minsk a solo concert of Krambambula was held. That was the first performance of the band in Minsk since 2008. On their Facebook page the musicians explained that the concert was arranged at the request of "one person": "One person found us and invited us to play a concert. We decided to agree, but we'll see what is going to be further".

== Discography ==
Albums:

- 2002 - Zastolny albom (Belarusian: "Застольны альбом", meaning "Table-album")
- 2003 - Karalі rayonu (Belarusian: "Каралі раёну", meaning "District kings")
- 2004 - Radio Krambambula 0,33 FM (Belarusian: "Радыё Крамбамбуля 0,33 FM")
- 2007 - Svyatochnaya (Belarusian: "Сьвяточная", meaning "Festive album")
- 2007 - The Best albo Belarusian Disco (compilation)
- 2011 - Drabadzi-drabada
- 2015 - Chyrvony shtral (Belarusian: "Чырвоны штраль")

Singles:

- 2007 - "Dolce Vita"
- 2010 - "Raz-dva-try — use za stol!" (Belarusian: "Раз-два-тры — усе за стол!", meaning "One-Two-Three - everybody at the table!")

== Band members ==
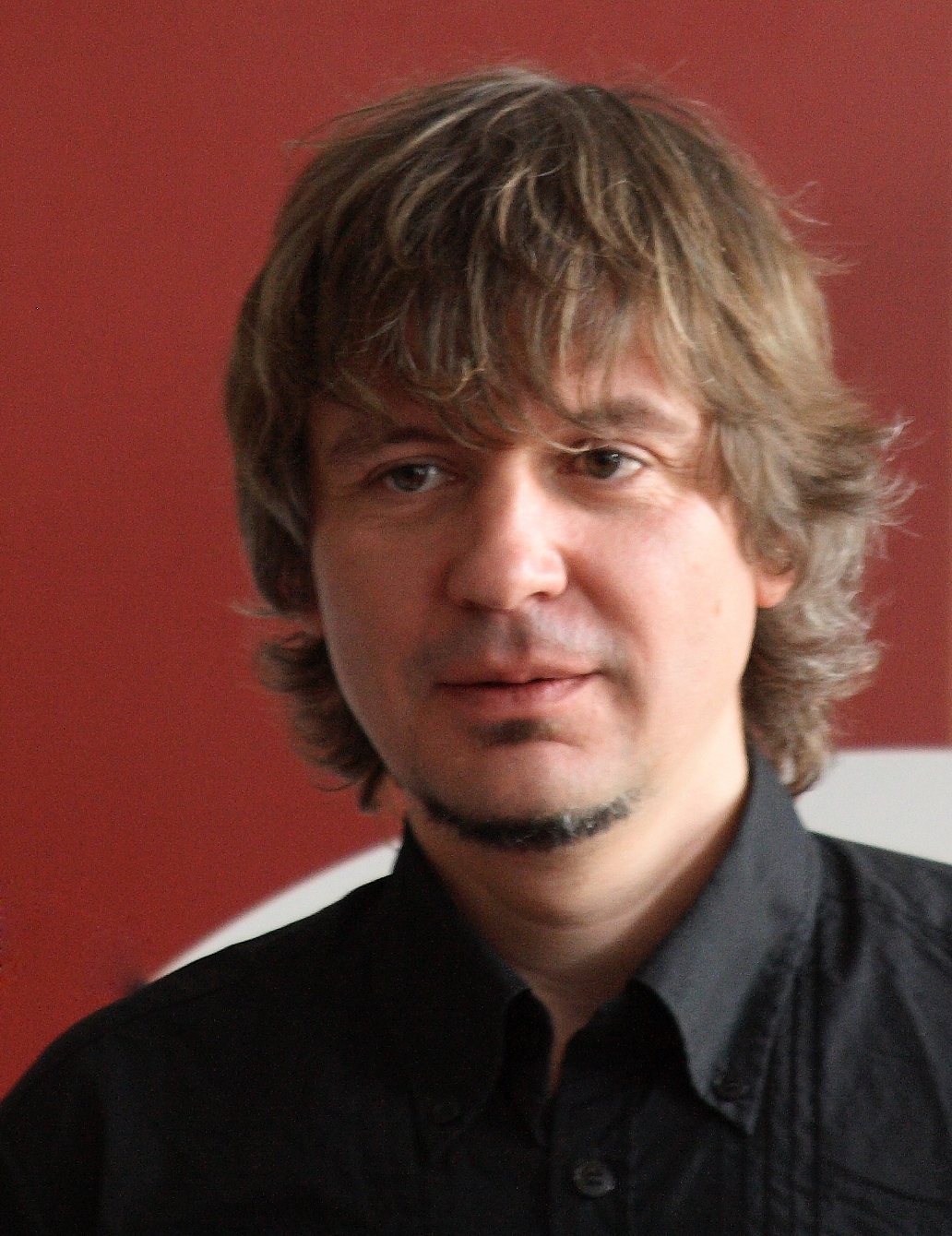
Lavon Volski in 2009

Current members:

- Lavon Volski - vocals, guitars, keyboards (since 2001)
- Ales Myshkevich - bass guitar, backing vocals (since 2010)
- Pavel Arakelyan - saxophone, flute, backing vocals (since 2012)
- Andrey Yakubchik - trumpet, backing vocals (since 2012)
- Pavel Mamonov - drums, percussion (since 2011)
- Pavel Triput - guitars (since 2014)

Former members:

- Sergey Kononovich - guitars, mandolin (2001-2009)
- Vladislav Plyushchev - bass guitar (2001-2010)
- Aleksandr Bykov - drums (2001-2006)
- Aleksandr Khavkin - violin, keyboards, harmonica (2001-2009)
- Pavel Kudrin - flute (2004)
- Nikolay Belanovich - drums (2006-2010)
- Yuriy Zhdanov - trumpet (2004-2007)
- Rodoslav Sosnovtsev - trumpet (2007-2012)
- Konstantin Karpovich - trombone (2004-2012)
- Pavel Tretyak - guitars, mandolin (2009-2012)
- Sergey Shtender - drums (2010-2012)
- Oleg Garus - guitars, backing vocals (2010-2013)

== Literature ==
- Д.П. (2008). "«КРАМБАМБУЛЯ»". Энцыклапедыя беларускай папулярнай музыкі. уклад. Дз. Падбярэзскі і інш (2000 экз ed.). Мінск: Zmicier Kołas. pp. 143–144. ISBN 978-985-6783-42-8.
