= Matryoshka (album) =

Studio album by Lyapis Trubetskoy
- Released: March 1, 2014
- Recorded: 2012–2013
- Genre: Ska punk Punk rock Ska core Alternative rock
- Length: 31:30
- Language: Russian
- Label: Soyuz Music

Lyapis Trubetskoy chronology
Gray (2011)	Matryoshka (2014)

Singles from Matryoshka
- 1. "Танцуй!" Released: May 25, 2013; 2. "Танк" Released: October 7, 2013; 3. "Матрёшка" Released: February 16, 2014; 4. "Воины Света" Released: March 4, 2014

Professional ratings
Review scores
Source	Rating
Experty.by	6.75/10 stars
InterMedia	3/5 stars

Matryoska is the 13th and the last studio album of Belarusian rock group Lyapis Trubetskoy. It was released on March 1, 2014.

== Background ==
At the same time the album was released, the group started a new tour, also named "Matryoshka". The group visited all the larger cities of Russia and Ukraine and also included other countries such as Latvia, Lithuania, Estonia, Kazakhstan, Poland, the Czech Republic, Germany, and Israel.

The album consists of ten new songs and the cover on "Государство", a song by Grazhdanskaya Oborona.

== Reception ==
Alexey Mazhaev from InterMedia believes that the conceptual nature of the album did not particularly benefit him. Sergei Budkin from Experty.by expressed the opinion that on this album, the musicians deliberately abandoned the surround sound and rich arrangements, so listening to their songs is sometimes a very difficult task.

== Track listing ==
Matryoshka
No.	Title	Length
1.	"Матрёшка" (Matryoshka)	2:57
2.	"Танцуй" (Dance)	1:53
3.	"Танк" (Tank)	2:34
4.	"Телевизор" (TV set)	2:43
5.	"Воины света" (Warriors of Light)	3:44
6.	"Молох" (Moloch)	2:52
7.	"Котлован" (Trench)	2:33
8.	"Чайка" (Seagull)	2:48
9.	"Командир" (Commander)	2:35
10.	"Государство" (State)	3:09
11.	"Клоуна нет" (Clown is gone)	3:42
Total length:		31:30

== Personnel ==
- Siarhei Mikhalok – vocals
- Ruslan Vladyko – guitar
- Pavel Bulatnikov – vocals, percussion
- Ivan Galushko – trombone
- Denis Sturchenko – bass guitar
- Vlad Senkevich – trumpet
- Denis Shurov – percussion
- Andrei Babrouka – sound engineer
- Dmitry Bobrovko – scene technician
- Pavel Tretyak – acoustic guitar
- Vlad Yarun
- Ted Jensen at Sterling Sound NYCЕ – mastering
