= Dvaccać vośmaja zorka =

Studio album by Mroja
- Released: 4 September 1990
- Recorded: 1989
- Genre: Hard rock
- Length: 38:28
- Label: Melodiya
- Producer: Alexander Shtilman

Mroja chronology
Studyja BM (1989)	Dvaccać vośmaja zorka (1990)	Bijapolie (1991)

Dvaccać vośmaja zorka (Cyrillic: Дваццаць восьмая зорка, [ˈdvatt͡sat͡sʲ ˈvɔsʲmaja ˈzɔrka], 28th Star) is the fourth album by Belarusian hard rock band Mroja, released on 4 September 1990. It is the only album the band released on the Soviet state label Melodiya.

The album was recorded in 1989 with Alexander Shtilman producing. In 1997, it was reissued on cassette. In 2009, it was reissued on CD, with two bonus tracks and a video from a Mroja concert in 1993. All eight tracks from the album were included on the compilation Vybranyja peśni 1989-1993 in 1993.

This was the only Mroja album to be released on CD.

== Track listing ==
1. «Дваццаць восьмая зорка» (Dvaccać vośmaja zorka, 28th Star)
2. «Мама-мафія» (Mama-mafija, Mother-Mafia)
3. «Шмат» (Šmat, A Lot)
4. «Кастрычніцкі цягнік» (Kastryčnicki ciahnik, October Train)
5. «Апошні інспэктар» (Apošni inspektar, The Last Inspector)
6. «Аўстралійская полька» (Australijskaja polka, Australian Polka)
7. «Зямля» (Ziamla, World)
8. «Я — рок-музыкант» (Ja - rok-muzykant, I'm a Rock Musician)

== Personnel ==
- Lavon Volsky – vocals, keyboards
- Benedict Konev-Petushkovich – guitar
- Yury Levkov – bass
- Oleg Demidovich – drums
