= Matryoshka (disambiguation) =

A Matryoshka doll, or Russian doll, is a set of dolls of decreasing sizes placed one inside the other.

Matryoshka, or variants, may also refer to:

== Arts, entertainment and media ==
- Matryoshka (album), by Lyapis Trubetskoy, 2014
- Matryoshka (play), a Persian-language satire, 2015
- Matryoshka Radio, a Russian-language radio station in the UK
- "Matryoshka", a song by Nico Touches the Walls from the 2011 album Passenger
- "Matryoshka", a Vocaloid song by Hachi
- "Matryoshka", a 1999 episode of TV series Millennium (season 3)
- Matroesjka's, a Belgian TV series

== Science and technology ==
- Matroska, a video container file format, in computing
- Matroshka experiments, assessing cosmic radiation doses on the International Space Station
- Matrioshka brain, a hypothetical computer surrounding a star
- Nivelir, a class of Russian LEO satellites compared to Matryoshka "nesting dolls"

== Other uses ==
- Matryoshka (diamond), a Russian double diamond

== See also ==
- Russian Dolls (disambiguation)
