= Sasha and Sirozha =

Belarusian comic duo

- Origin: Belarus
- Genres: comedy, musical theatre
- Years active: 1999–2008
- Label: Moon Records Ukraine,
- Members: Siarhei Mikhalok; Aliaksei Hatskevich; Matvey Saburov

Sasha and Sirozha (Belarusian: Саша i Сірожа, Russian: Саша и Сирожа) was a Belarusian multimedial comical duo formed by musician Siarhei Mikhalok and artist Aliaksei Hatskevich. Later their team included Matvey Saburov (Матвей Сабуров) for technical support. Their activities are broad in nature and include TV series, radio series, comics, and music albums. In 2008 Mikhalok put the project on hold, to focus on working in the rock group Lyapis Trubetskoy.

"Sasha" is a diminutive from the name Aleksandr, Sirozha is a trasianka corruption of "Seryozha", a diminutive from the name Sergey.

The image of Sasha and Sirozha is that of not very bright youth, comparable to Beavis and Butt-Head.

== History ==
Miklalok described the origins of the project as follows. "Some time ago we drew comic strips with characters who were two real Belarusian guys, Sasha and Sirozha, and they could be described as being in transition between country hicks and city bums. They are versed in music, know rap and metal, can discourse on many serious issues of modern times. The friends roam Minsk and end up in various comical accidents". Representatives of the First Musical Channel noticed these and suggested to bring them to film, which led to their first TV series, Kalykhanka ("Lullaby").

Since 2000 Kalykhanka was produced by the Belarusian First Musical TV Channel, since 2004 it was produced by TV channel M1, Kiev, Ukraine. In 2006 it was ranked third in nomination "TV Series" for the prize "Teletriumph" by the Ukrainian National Council on TV and Radio.

== Discography ==
=== Studio albums ===
- An Opera for the Lazy Ones (Russian: Опера для ленивых) (2003)
  Parody sketches of popular operas
- Ска-ты! (2005)
