= Lavon Volski =

Belarusian musician, writer, and painter

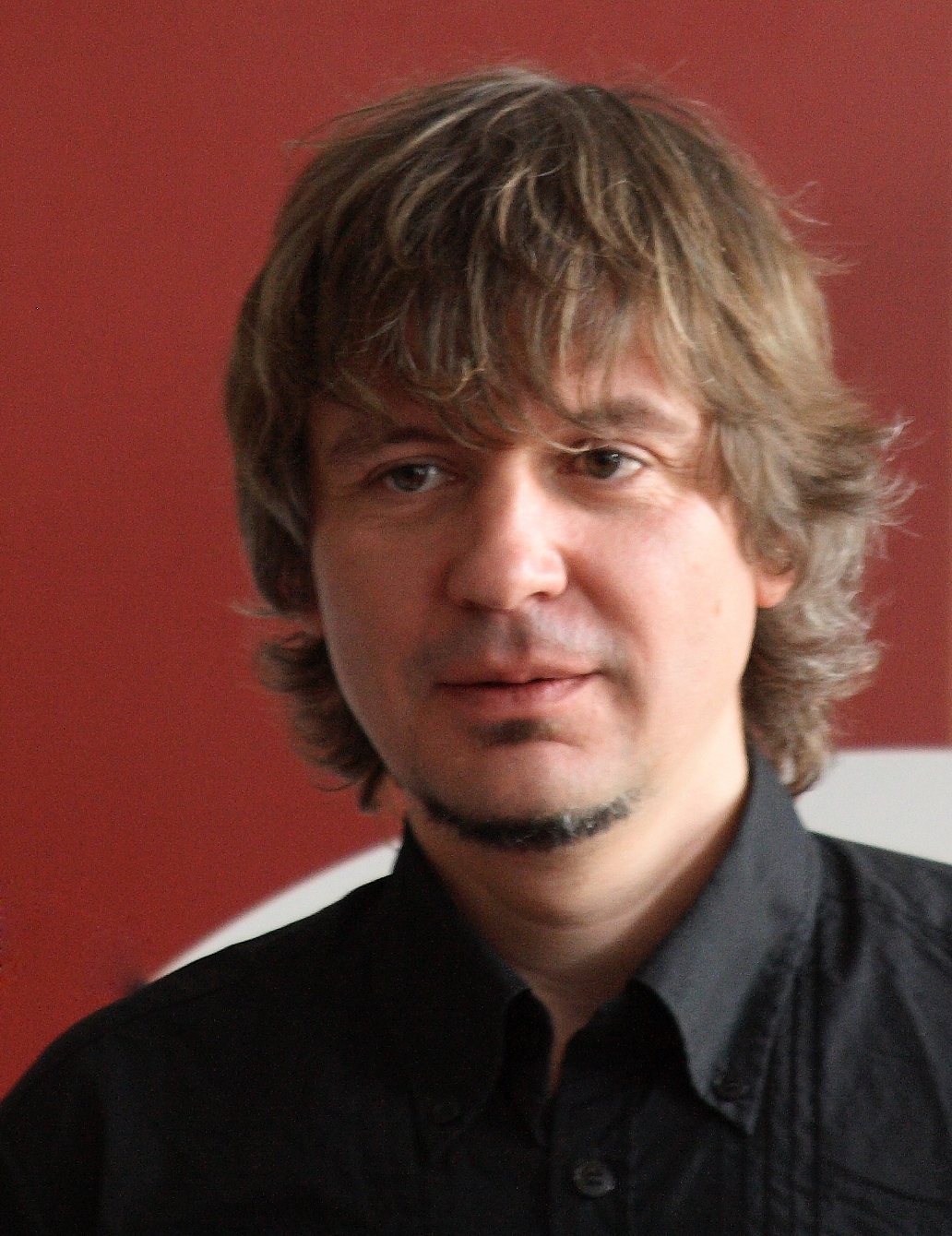

Background information
- Born: 14 September 1965 (age 61); Minsk, Belarusian SSR, USSR
- Origin: Belarus
- Genres: rock, hard rock, pop rock, alternative rock
- Instruments: vocals, guitar, keyboards
- Years active: 1980–present
- Labels: Melodiya, Kovcheg
- Member of: Krambambula
- Formerly of: Mroja, N.R.M.

Leanid Arturavich Zaidel-Volski (Belarusian: Леанід Арту́равіч Зайдэль-Во́льскі; born on 14 September 1965 in Minsk), better known as Lavon Volski (Belarusian: Ляво́н Во́льскі, romanized: Lyavon Volski, pronounced [lʲaˈvon ˈvolʲskʲi]), is a Belarusian musician, writer, painter, and founder of the Belarusian rock bands Mroja, N.R.M., Zet, and Krambambula.

== Biography ==
Lavon Volski is a Belarusian rock musician, an author of music and lyrics, poet, artist, group leader of N.R.M. and Krambambula, the winner of numerous musical awards, both personal and as a member of various collectives.

== Career ==
He was a vocalist and a keyboard player of the Belarusian Rock-band Mroja. He wrote lyrics for ULIS, album Pa-nad dachami (1995) and was guitar player and the vocalist of Novaje Nieba. Now he is the rhythm guitar player and the vocalist of N.R.M., Zet and Krambambula. In 2008, he has also started a solo career and released a first album called "Bielaja jablynia hromu" in March 2010. He wrote satyrical Cabaret-styled songs about political and social topics for the Belarusian-language radio channel Radio Svaboda. In 2014, he released the solo album Hramadaznaŭstva (Social Studies) - an author's view of the problems of modern Belarusian society.

On the New Year 2019 he acted and directed the musical show “We will be not understood in Moscow” (Belarusian: «Нас у Маскве не зразумеюць») by Tuzin.fm, “Belsat Music Live”, and himself.

== Publications ==
He wrote two books of poetry: Kalidor ("Corridor") (1993) and Fotaalbom ("Photo album") (2000), a prose book Milarus ("Dear + Belarus") (2011) and writes for Nasha Niva and the Teksty magazine.

== Discography ==
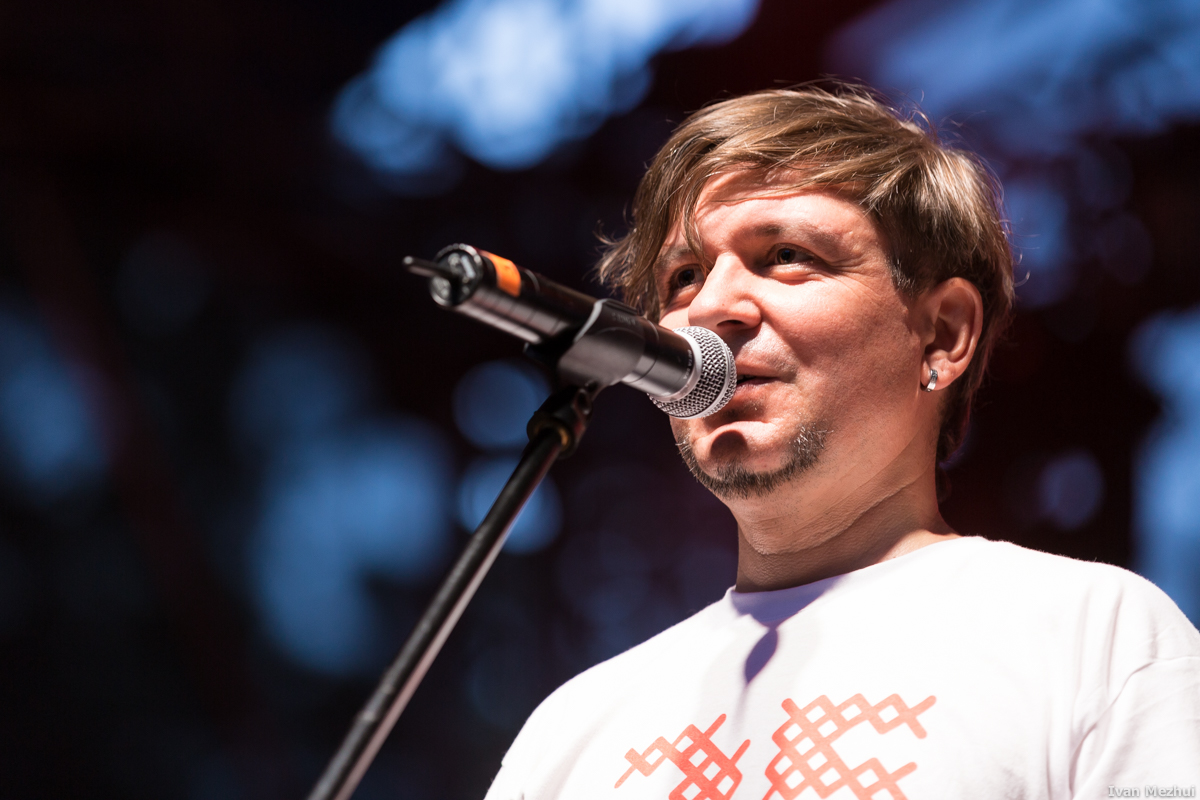
Basowiszcza, 2014

=== With Mroya (1986-1994) ===
- Stary chram ("Old Temple")
- Zrok ("Vision")
- Studyja BM ("Studio BM")
- 28-ja zorka (“Star 28")

=== With N.R.M. ===
- Lalalala (1995)
- Odzirydzidzina (1996)
- Pašpart hramadzianina N.R.M. ("Passport of citizen of N.R.M.") (1998)
- Try čarapachi ("Three turtles") (2000)
- Dom kultury ("House of Culture") (2002)
- 06 (2007)

=== With Krambambula ===
- Zastolny albom (2002)
- Karali rajonu ("Kings of the District") (2003)
- "Radio "Krambambulya” 0,33FM" (2004)
- Krambambula śviatočnaja ("Krambambulya festive") (2007)
- Drabadzi-drabada (2011)
- Čyrvony štral ("Red Strahl") (2015)

=== Solo projects ===
- Kuplety i prypievy (“Couplets and choruses") (2008)
- Biełaja jabłynia hromu ("White apple tree of thunder") (2010)
- Hramadaznaŭstva (“Social science") (2014)
- Psychasamatyka ("Psychosomatics")(2016)
- Hravitacyja ("Gravity") (2019)
- Ameryka ("America") (2020)
- Trybunał ("Tribunal") (2021)
- Listy palitviaźniam ("Letters to Political Prisoners") (2023)

=== Collaborative albums ===
- Narodny Albom ("People's album") (1997)
- Śviaty Viečar 2000 ("Holy evening 2000") (1999)
- Ja naradziŭsia tut ("I was born here") (2000)
- Takoha niama nidzie ("There is no such thing anywhere") (2010)
- Emihranty ("Emigrants") (2023)

=== Singles and EPs ===
- Vive Le Matin! (2010)
- Try čarapachi (2019)
- Hierojam Słava! (2022)
- Biełaruś nie Łukašenka (2024)

=== Compilation albums ===
- Premjer Tuzin 2005 (2005)
- Premjer Tuzin 2006 (2006)

== Miscellanea ==
Four songs written by Lavon Volski were performed in the 2006 documentary A Lesson of Belarusian, which dealt with the Belarusian democracy movement and the 2006 re-election of Alexander Lukashenko as president. Three of these were performed by N.R.M., the other by Belarusian students.

The song Try čarapachi (Belarusian: Тры чарапахі) that he wrote for the namesake album became very popular among Belarusians. It is often performed during opposition protests, among students, and among Belarusians in emigration.

At the end of 2023, Belarusian courts added Volsky's Telegram and Instagram pages to the list of extremist materials.

== Soundtracks and arrangements ==
- Author's broadcast "Kvadrakola" for "Radio "BM" (1992–1994)
- Author's broadcast "Kvadrakola" for "Radio "Racyja" (1998–2002)
- OST to the feature film "Koler kachannia" ("The Color of Love") (2005)
- Music for the play on the base of the Minsk Theater for Young People ("TJUH") by the play of F. Alehnovich "Pan ministr" ("Pan Minister") (2008)
- OST the feature film "Dastish fantastish" (2010)
- OST and lyrics to the socio-cultural video "Budzma blarusami" ("We are Belarusians") (2010)
- OST and concept to the socio-political cabaret "Saŭka dy Hryška" in song format for "Radio "Liberty" (2010–2012)
- OST and script to the feature film "Adnojčy ŭ Barachlandyi" (film-tale: "Once upon time in Barahlyandiya") (2010)
- OST to the feature film "Žyvie Biełaruś" ("Viva Belarus"), the premiere of the film was on May 22, 2012, at the 65th Cannes Film Festival (2012)
- Musical arrangement and script to the historical and humorous program "Nazad u budučyniu" ("Back to the Future") for the Polish-Belarusian TV channel "Belsat" (2012–2014)
- OST and script to the feature film "Byvaj, Ziamla" ("Farewell, Earth!") (2014)
- 2014-2018 OST and concept to the socio-political cabaret "Saŭka dy Hryška" in the animated clip format for "Radio "Liberty" (2014–2018)
- The satirical radio program "Aranžavyja akulary" ("Orange glasses") for "Radio "Liberty" (2015)
- Musical arrangement to the concert-musical "Narodny albom" ("Folk Album") for the "Bialystok Opera" (2016)
- The song "Namaluj" ("Draw") - the musical part of the project "Kazimir Malevich for children" with the support of The Malevich Society is a private American not-for-profit organization (2017)

== Awards ==
- People's Choice Award at the festival "Rock-step 1988"; winner of "Navapolack 1988" festival (1988)
- Grand Prix in the nomination "The best keyboardist" at the festival "Three Colors 1990" (1990)
- Rock crown in the nomination "Song of the Year" ("Partisan song") (1996)
- Rock crown in the category "Album of the Year" ("Folk album") (1997)
- Rock crown-1997 in the nomination “Band of the Year "N.R.M." (1997)
- People's Choice Award (1998)
- Project of the Year ("Holy night 2000") (1999)
- Song of the Year ("The balloon") (1999)
- Musician of the Year (2000)
- Event of the Year (the project "I was born here") (2000)
- The best lyrics (2000)
- Song of the Year ("Three turtles") (2000)
- Album of the Year ("Three turtles") (2000)
- Rock crown (2000)
- Artist of the Year, Album of the Year and Song of the Year – "Rock-Coronation-2002" (2002)
- Artist of the Year at the "Rock-Coronation 2004–2005" (2004–2005)
- Artist of the Year at the "Rock Coronation 2007" (2007)
- Freemuse Award (2016)
- The Medal of the Belarusian Independent Republic for Merits in the Revival of Belarusian Culture (2019)
