= N.R.M. =

Belarusian rock band

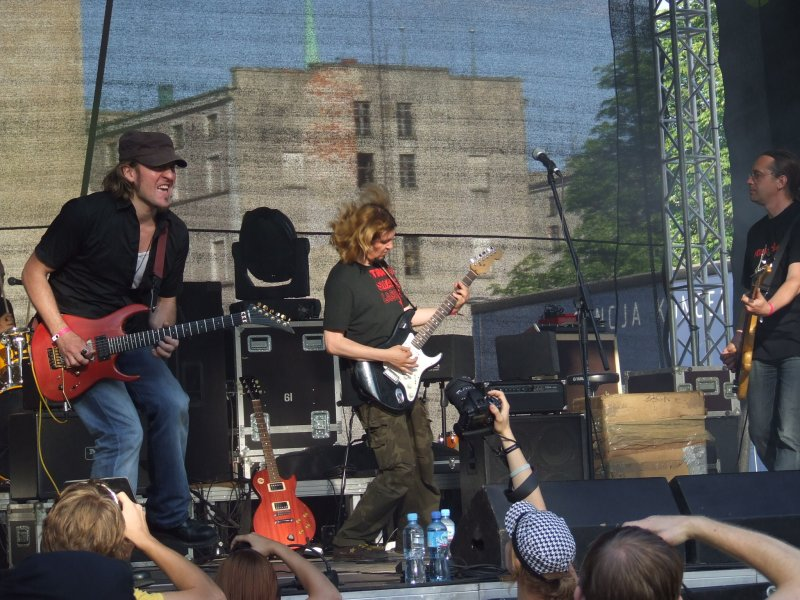
- N.R.M. at concert wRock for freedom, Wrocław

Background information
- Also known as: Mroja
- Origin: Minsk, Belarus
- Genres: Rock
- Years active: 1981–present
- Label: West Records
- Members: Oleg Demidovich; Yury Levkov; Pete Pavlov
- Past members: Lavon Volski; Vladimir Davidovsky; Benedict Konev-Petushkovich; Oleg Pipin; Leonid Shirin; Victor Smolsky; Viktor Shot; Yury Tsyankevich

N.R.M. (Belarusian: Незалежная Рэспубліка Мроя, romanized: Niezaležnaja Respublika Mroja, [nʲɛzaˈlɛʐnaja rɛˈspublika ˈmrɔja], "Independent Republic of Dreams" in English) are a rock band from Minsk, Belarus, founded in 1981 as Mroja (Belarusian: Мроя). They are considered to be the most popular rock band in the country. They perform in the Belarusian language, and are a rallying point for political opposition to the Belarusian government, despite being the target of a performance ban from 2006 to 2009.

== History ==
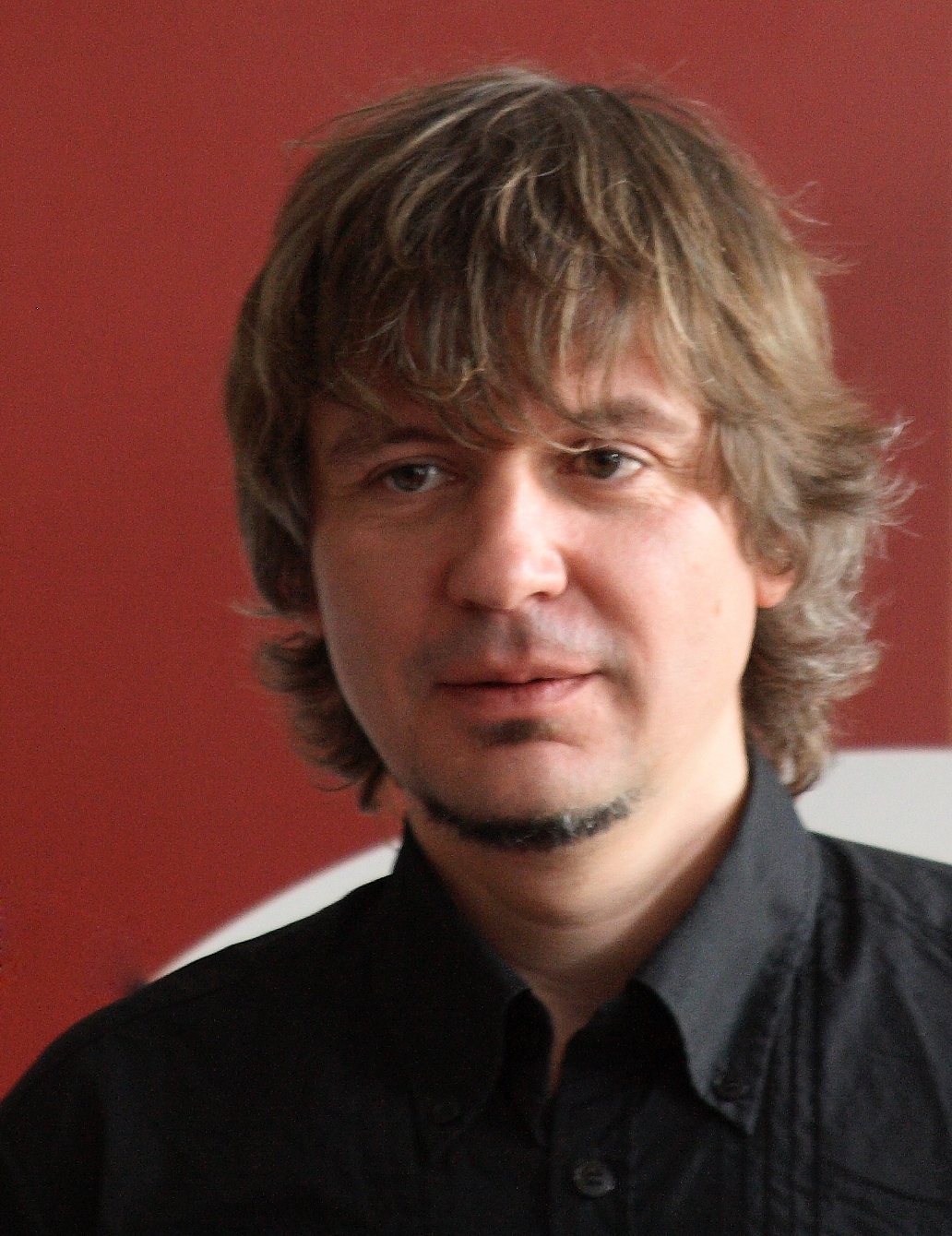
Lavon Volski

Mroja were founded in 1981 at Alexei Glebov University in Minsk by Lavon Volski (keys, vocals) and Vladimir Davidovsky (guitar). They held their first gig on 7 November 1981. Through the 1980s, there were several lineup changes. A few albums were also released. On 24 September 1989, the group played the Chervona Ruta festival in Chernovtsy, playing the songs "Šmat", "Australijskaja polka", "Mama — Mafija" and "Ziamla". In 1989, they recorded eight songs with producer Alexander Shtilman, released the following year as Dvaccać vośmaja zorka (28th Star) on Melodiya, the group's only release with the label. The lineup on DVZ was: Lavon Volski – keyboards and lead vocals, Benedict Konev-Petushkovich – guitars, Yury Levkov – bass and Oleg Demidovich – drums and backing vocals. Davidovsky had left the group that year and was replaced by Konev-Petushkovich, who stayed on until 1992. He was replaced by Oleg Pipin and a couple of others before settling with Pete Pavlov in 1993. The Volsky-Pavlov-Levkov-Demidovich lineup would rename itself to N.R.M. in late 1994.

Their music tends toward melodic hard rock with witty and often indirectly political lyrics. Since the late 1990s, the band's albums and publicity materials generally use the Łacinka alphabet, the Belarusian version of the Latin alphabet that was widely used alongside Cyrillic prior to the establishment of the Soviet Union. Some songs from NRM's first album under that name, LaLaLaLa, were performed by Mroja as early as 1990.

Like several other bands that sing in Belarus, they have expressed their opposition to President Alexander Lukashenko, although they have never mentioned him by name in their lyrics. N.R.M.'s largest crowd was in Kyiv in 2004, when they played in support of the Orange Revolution in Ukraine, with band members expressing their hope that something similar would happen in their own country.

In the following years N.R.M.—along with many other Belarusian bands—was unofficially banned from FM station broadcast in Belarus. There was no written blacklist, but FM station managers said they received unofficial "recommendations" from the authorities.

Despite this unofficial three-year ban, the group continued its concert activity. Numerous performances abroad took place in Poland, Germany, Slovakia, Sweden. In Belarus, however, the group remained on the forbidden list, therefore they seldom held public concerts and played in underground conditions.

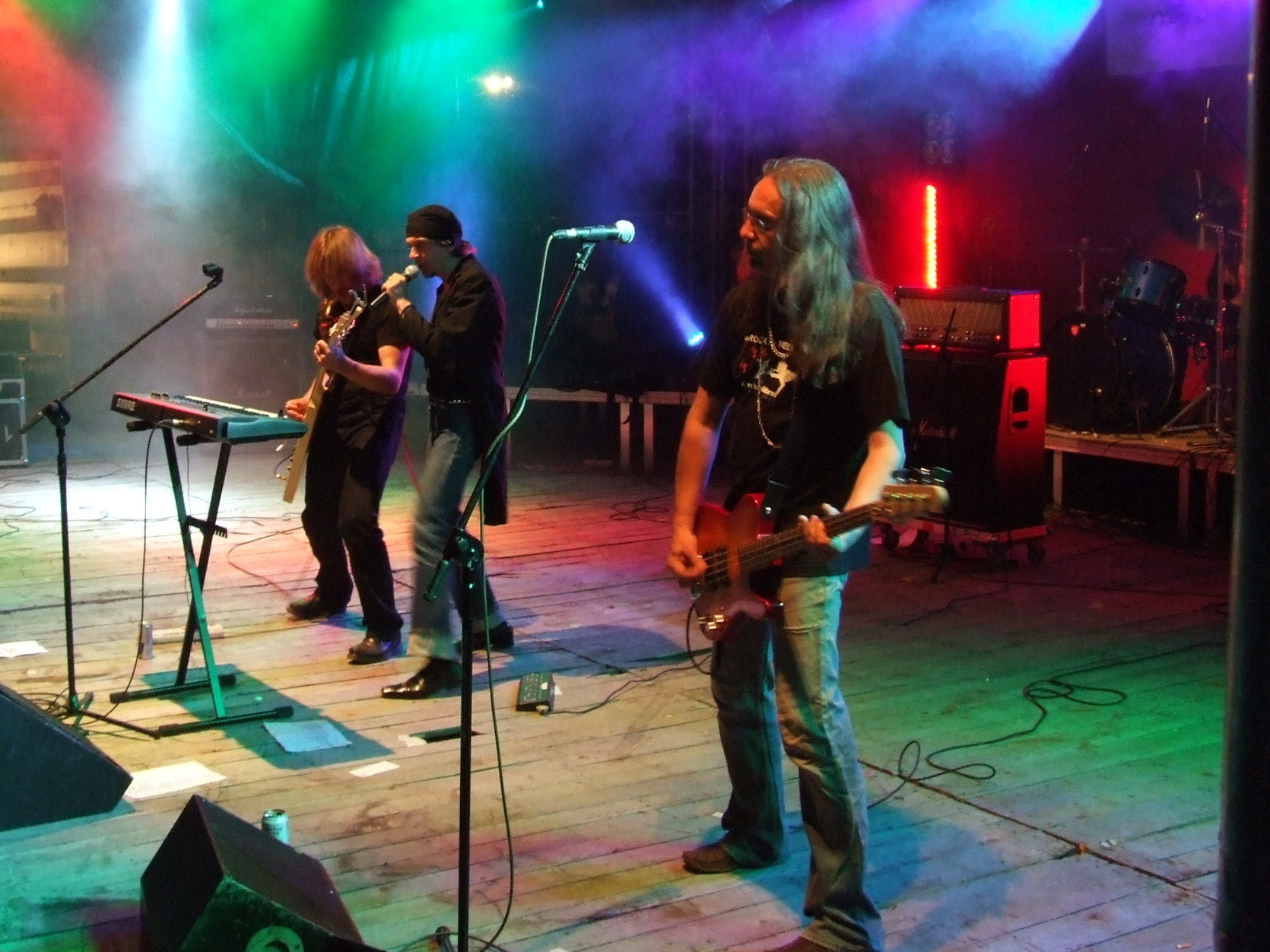
N.R.M. performing as Mroja at the Basovišča festival in Poland, 2009

In 2007, sixth studio album 06 was released. It was recorded, according to Lavon Volski, under the influence of political events of spring 2006 in Belarus. The album is compiled with songs of different styles. The violoncello, mandoline, and keyboard were used, all of which were new instruments for the group. For the first time songs were sung not only by Lavon Volski, but also by other participants of the group and even a children's choir.

After a late-2007 meeting of Belarusian rock-musicians with the deputy head of the Presidential Administration on Ideology Oleg Proleskovsky, the band was removed from the banned list.

For its concert, at the "Rock Coronation Awards" 2009 ceremony in May 2010 the band got awarded in the category of “Event of the Year”.

In 2010, Volski left the group. N.R.M. continued playing as a three-piece band. Their last album, D.P.B.Č, was released in 2013.

Ten years after Volski's departure, the band reunited to release a video entitled Try čarapachi 2020, in support of the Belarusian pro-democracy protests, as the song, originally released in 2000, had become an anthem of the demonstrations.

== Albums ==
As Mroja

Year of release	Original title	Title	Label
1986	Stary chram	Old Temple	
1987	Zrok	Vision	
1989	Studyja BM	Studio BM	
1990	Dvaccać vośmaja zorka	Twenty-eighth Star	Melodiya
1991	Bijapolie	Biofield	
1992	Lepšyja peśni z albomau 1988–1990	The Best Songs from the Albums 1988–1990	Kovčeg
1993	Vybranyja peśni 1989–1993	Selected Songs 1989–1993	ZBS

As N.R.M.

Year of release	Original title	Title	Label
1995	ŁaŁaŁaŁa		Kovčeg
1996	Odzirydzidzina		Kovčeg
1997	Made in N.R.M.		
1998	Pašpart hramadzianina N.R.M.	Passport of the N.R.M Citizen	Kovčeg
1999	Akustyčnyja kancerty kanca XX stahodździa	Acoustic Concerts of the End of the 20th Century	Kovčeg
2000	Samotnik (single)	Single	
2000	Try čarapachi	Three Turtles	Bulba Records
2002	Dom kultury	Palace of Culture	BMA
2004	Spravazdača 1994–2004	Report of 1994–2004	West Records
2007	06 (album)		
2013	Д.П.Б.Ч. (Da pabačennia)	D.P.B.C. (Goodbye)	PetePaff Inc.
2025	Kropka	Point	

=== Other projects ===
- Peśniarok (1997), tribute to Pesniary
- Narodny albom (Folk Album) (1997)
- Ja naradziusya tut (I was born here) (2000)
- Serca Eǔropy in rock (Heart of Europe in Rock) (2001)
- Personal Depeche (2002), Belarusian tribute to Depeche Mode
- Generały ajčynnaha roku (Generals of Domestic Rock) (2004)
- NiezałežnyJa (IndependentMe) (2008)
- Budzma The Best Rock / Budzma The Best Rock/New (2009)

== Line-up ==
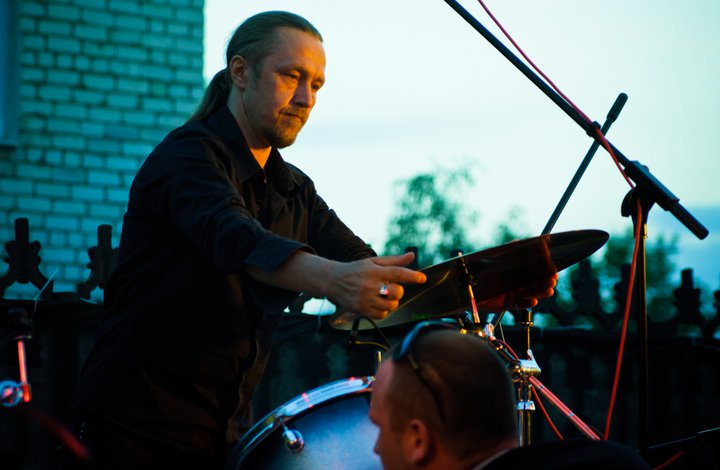
Oleg Demidovich

- Pete Pawlaw - guitar (since 1993), lead vocals (since 2010)
- Yuras' Ljaukou - bass (since 1981)
- Aleg Dzemidovich - drums (since 1981)

=== Past members ===
- Lavon Volsky - lead vocals, keyboards, guitars (1981–2010)
- Vladimir Davidovsky - guitar (1981–1989)
- Sergei Loskutov - rhythm guitar (1981)
- Benedict Konev-Petushkovich - guitar (1989–1992)
- Oleg Pipin - guitar (1992)
- Leonid Shirin - guitar (June–September 1992)
- Viktor Shot - guitar (September 1992–1993)
- Yury Tsyankevich - percussion (1992–1994)
- Viktor Smolsky - guitar (1993)

== Popular culture ==
The band appeared during one of their concerts at an opposition rally in 2006, which was featured in the documentary, A Lesson of Belarusian

During the 2020–2021 Belarusian protests band leader Pete Pawlow performed the song Try čarapachi on the opposition march in front of armed militsia, the song was also performed multiple times by protesters during the marches.

== Bibliography ==
- Viktar Dziatlikovič. Ich Mroja, ich NRM. Minsk: Sučasny litaratar, 2005.
