= Brutto (band) =

Belarusian punk-rock band

BRUTTO
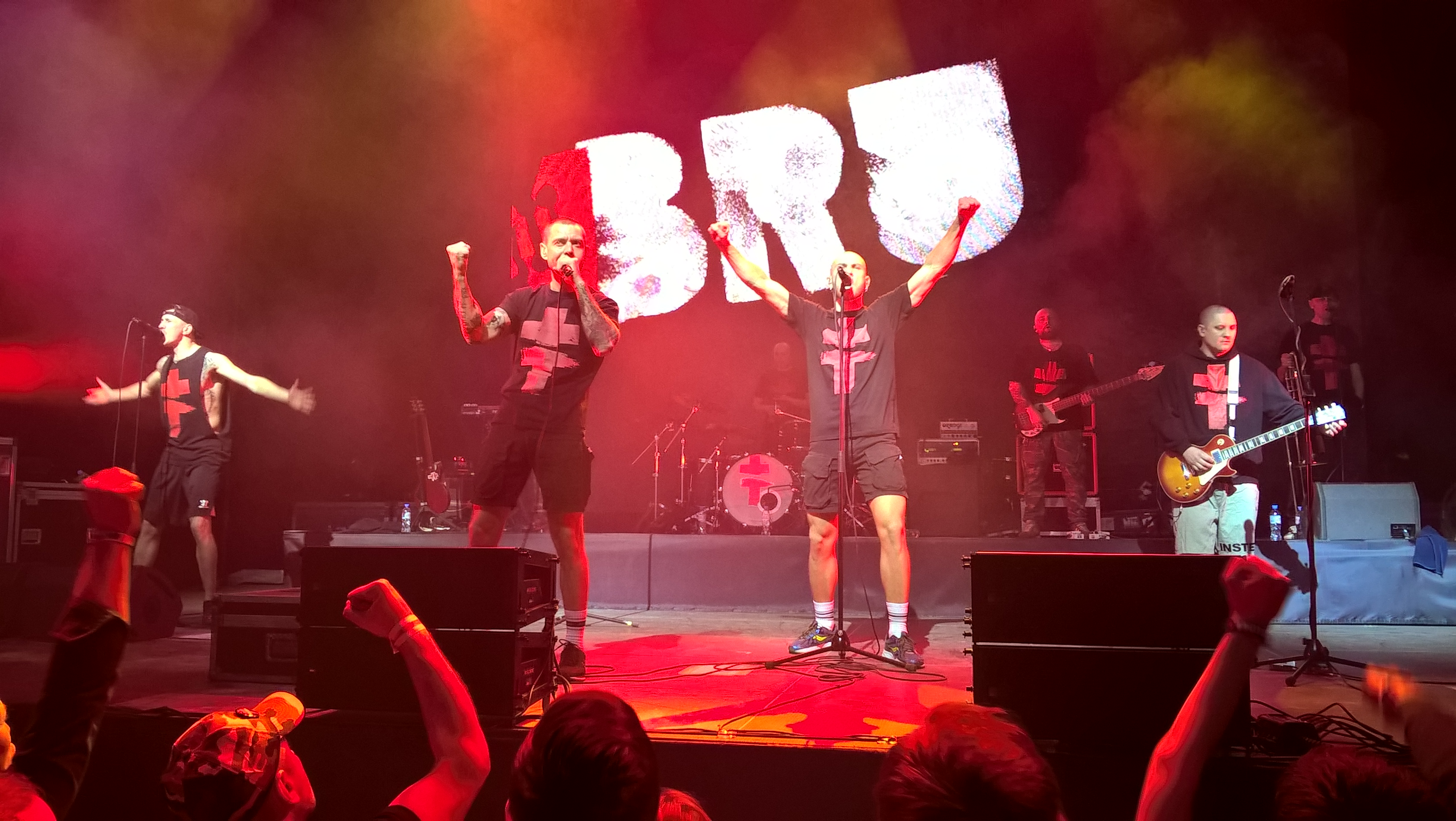
- Brutto in Baranavichy, Belarus

Background information
- Origin: Minsk, Belarus
- Genres: Punk rock · street punk · ska punk
- Years active: 2014—present
- Members: Siarhei Mikhalok and co.

Brutto is a Belarusian punk rock band founded by Siarhei Mikhalok on 1 September 2014 after the demise of the band Lyapis Trubetskoy.

== Discography ==
=== Studio albums ===
- Underdog (12 September 2014)
- Rodny Kraj (2015)
- Рокі (1 May 2017)

=== Singles ===
- BRUTTO (1 September 2014)
- Underdog (9 September 2014)
- Адидас (12 November 2014)
- Железный (12 November 2014)
- Будзь смелым! (15 December 2014)
- Воины света (22 December 2014)
- Гарри (6 January 2015)
- Партизан рок (3 March 2015)
- Рокi (1 March 2017)
- Мельхиор и Каспар (1 October 2019)

=== Music videos ===
- BRUTTO (1 September 2014)
- Underdog (9 September 2014)
- Гири (5 October 2014)
- Мяч (21 October 2014)
- Adиdas (12 November 2014)
- Будзь смелым! (15 December 2014)
- Наша возьме (26 December 2014)
- Партизан рок (3 March 2015)
- Родны Край (1 September 2015)
- Рокi (1 March 2017)
- Папяроска (26 September 2017)
- Годзе (31 October 2017)
- Мельхиор и Каспар (1 October 2019)

== Members ==
- Siarhei Mikhalok – vocals (2014—present)
- Vitaly Gurkov – vocals (2014—present)
- Sergey (Brazil) – vocals (2014—present)
- Pavel Tretyak (Pasha Lanister) – guitar's, keyboards (2014—present)
- Denys Mel'nik (Left) – guitar, vocals (2014—present)
- Petr Losevskiy (Petya Aist) – vocals (2014—present)
- Denys Sturchenko – bass guitar (2014—present)
- Denys Shurov – drums (2014—present)
