= Krambambula (drink) =

Type of cocktail from Belarus

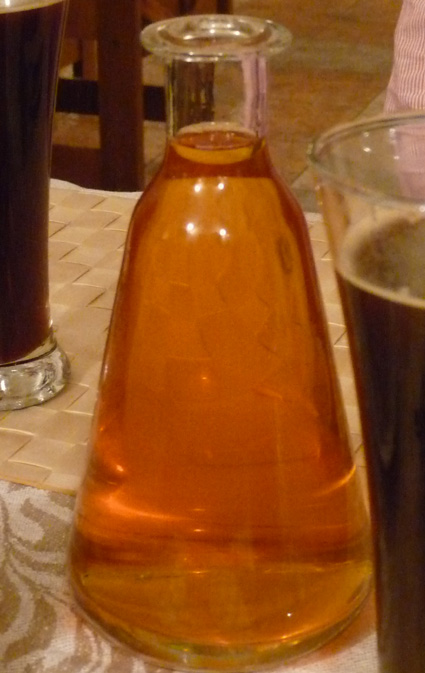
Belarusian Krambambula in a Moscow restaurant

Krambambula is a Belarusian alcoholic mix drink or cocktail that typically consists of red wine, and various kinds of liquor, including gin, vodka, or rum - there are many different recipes. Commercially produced versions are also available in some areas.

== Etymology ==
The name probably derives from the Old High German word Kranawitu or chranawita ("croaker timber," another name for juniper) and the Rotwelsch word Blamp (alcoholic drink).

== History ==
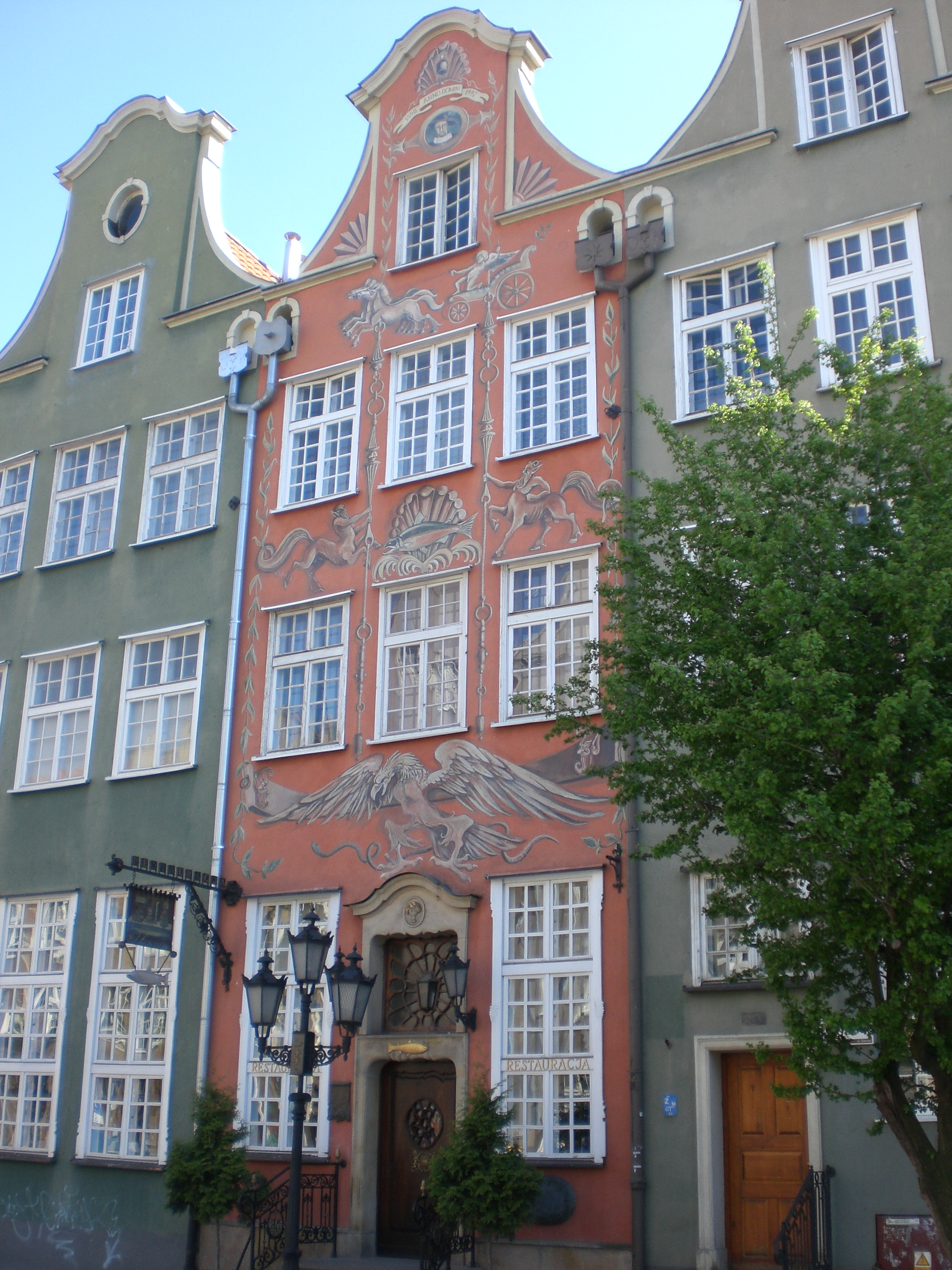
Pod Łososiem (The Salmon) restaurant in Gdańsk

A red-colored cherry liqueur called Krambambuli was formerly produced by a distillery in Danzig (Gdańsk) established by Ambrosius Vermöllen, a Mennonite immigrant from De Lier in Holland, who received Danzig citizenship on 6 July 1598.

== See also ==
- Medovukha
