= Siarhei Mikhalok =

Belarusian singer (born 1972)

Siarhei Mikhalok Belarusian: Сяргей Міхалок
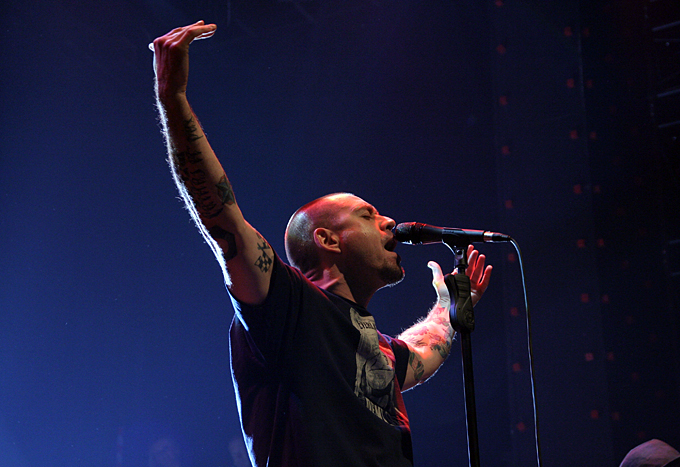

Background information
- Born: January 19, 1972 (age 54)
- Origin: Belarus
- Genres: Punk rock
- Occupations: Musician, singer-songwriter
- Instruments: Vocals, guitar, accordion
- Years active: 1990–present

Siarhei Mikhalok (born January 19, 1972, Belarusian: Сяргей Міхалок, Russian: Серге́й Михалок, Sergey Mikhalok) is a Belarusian rock musician and actor. He is the frontman of the ska punk band Lyapis Trubetskoy, which was re-established in 2022 after 8 years of hiatus. He was also the frontman of the band Brutto, now leads Drezden.

Born into a family of a Soviet military man in Dresden, East Germany. The family was originally from Minsk. He grew up in Siberia.

He graduated from the Belarusian State Academy of Arts.

In 1990, he created the rock band Lyapis Trubetskoy. Siarhey Mikhalok also worked in a theatre and as art director of a reggae club in Minsk. In 2000, he became a member of the comic duo Sasha i Sirozha. Since 2003 he has worked with Liavon Volski's music project Krambambula.

Since May 2015, Mikhalok has been an official permanent resident of Ukraine. He had already lived in Ukraine since December 2014.

In 2025, the Belarusian Ministry of Internal Affairs placed Mikhalok on a wanted list for insulting Alexander Lukashenko; he was later also charged with "inciting social hatred." In the summer of 2026, Siarhei Mikhalok was sentenced in absentia to four years in prison on these two charges. According to the prosecutor's office, the criminal case was based on negative assessments of Lukashenko, law enforcement agencies, and the military (including Mikhalok's video address after the Russian invasion of Ukraine) in videos published on the Brutto project's websites.
