= Lyapis Trubetskoy =

Belarusian rock band

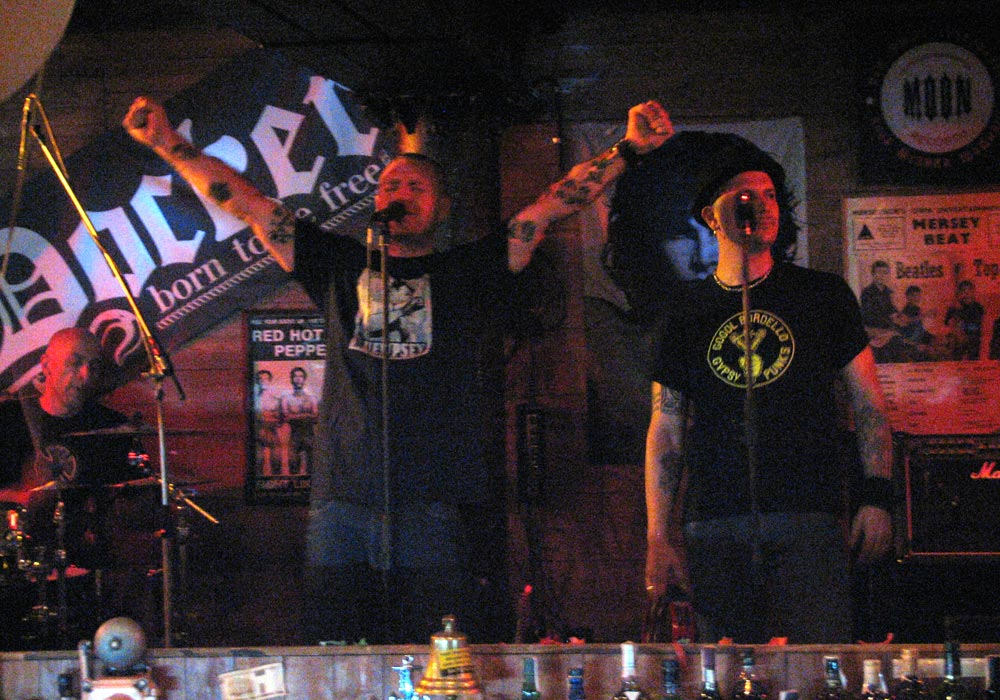
- Lyapis Trubetskoy live at Docker Pub in Kyiv, Ukraine, on 23 August 2008.

Background information
- Origin: Minsk, Belarus
- Genres: Rock, ska-punk, anarchist music
- Years active: 1990–2014, 2022-present
- Label: West Records
- Members: Siarhei Mikhalok, Pavel Bulatnikov, Ruslan Vladyko, Denis Sturchenko, Pavel Kozyukovich, Ivan Galushko, Denis Shurov
- Past members: Aliaksandar Starazhuk, Aliaksandar Rolov, Georgiy Dryndin, Uladimir Yelkin, Alel Lado, Yury Zadiran, Valery Bashkov, Dmitry Sviridovich, Vitaly Drazdou, Aliaksei Zaytsau, Alexey Lyubavin, Ruslan Uladyka
- Website: lyapis.eu

Lyapis Trubetskoy (Russian: Ляпис Трубецкой, Belarusian: Ляпіс Трубяцкі, romanized: Lyapis Trubyatski) is a Belarusian rock band. It was named after the comical hero from Ilya Ilf's and Yevgeny Petrov's novel "The Twelve Chairs", poet and potboiler Nikifor Lyapis, who used the pseudonym Trubetskoy.

On 17 March 2014 frontman Siarhei Mikhalok announced that the band would be dissolved. Accordingly, on 31 August the band ceased to exist and split into two ensambles: Brutto and Trubetskoy.

The group resumed its activities in 2022 against the background of Russia's invasion of Ukraine.

== History ==
=== Popularity in the 2000s ===
In January 2009 their album Manifest became "the best album of the year 2008" according to the West Records top-list and The Lenta music review. In August 2009 they played as headliners at the “Be Free” festival organized by the European Radio for Belarus in Chernihiv (Ukraine) together with Vopli Vidopliassova, Hair Peace Salon, and more Belarusian and Ukrainian rock bands. Lyapis Trubetskoy was one of the bands that performed (in December 2013) for Euromaidan-protesters in Kyiv, Ukraine.

=== Dissolution ===
Frontman Siarhei Mikhalok announced in mid-March 2014 that the group would disband in September 2014. The groups farewell concert was given in the Valeriy Lobanovskyi Dynamo Stadium in Kyiv, Ukraine on 26 August. Mayor of Kyiv Vitali Klitschko was present at this concert.

Former band members led by Pavel Bulatnikaw formed a new band Trubetskoy Minsk. Siarhei Mikhalok founded the band Brutto.

=== Resumption of activities ===
In November 2022 Lyapis issued a new music video to their song Harry, which was translated into Ukrainian by Serhiy Zhadan. The band also announced a charity concert in support of the Armed Forces of Ukraine in the Kyiv Palace of Sports.

== Albums ==
Year of release	Original title	Title	Label
2014	Матрёшка	Matrioshka	No Label
2014	Воины света	Warriors of Light	No Label
2012	Рабкор	Rabcor	No Label
2011	Весёлые картинки	Funny pictures	No Label
2010	Грай	Play!	Eastblok Music
2010	Агитпоп	Agitpop (German collection)	Eastblok Music
2009	Культпросвет	Kultprosvet	No Label
2008	Manifest	Manifesto	No Label
2007	Капитал	Capital	Nikitin
2006	Мужчины не плачут	Men Don't Cry (Soundtracks)	Birds Fabric
2004	Аргентина	Argentina	No Label
2004	Золотые яйцы	Golden Balls	West Records (Belarus) , Lavina music (Ukraine)
2003	Чырвоны кальсоны (макси-сингл)	Red Pants	Birds Fabric
2001	Ляписденс – 2	Lyapis-dance – 2	No Label
2001	Юность	Youth	GRAND
2000	Тяжкий	Heavy	REAL
2000	Всем девчонкам нравится	Liked by All the Girls	No Label
1999	Ляписденс	Lyapis-dance	No Label
1999	Красота	Beauty	No Label
1998	Любови капец: архивные записи 1992–1995	Love is gone: archive recordings 1992–1995	No Label
1998	Ты кинула	You Gave Me Up	No Label
1997	Смяротнае вяселле	Mortal Carnival	No Label
1996	Ранетое сердце	Wounded Heart	Satis
1995	Любови капец! — Live '95	Love is gone! — Live '95	Satis

== Videography ==
- 2022 – Harry (Гаррі)
- 2014 – Warriors of Light (Воины Света)
- 2014 – Matryoshka (Матрёшка)
- 2013 – Tank (Танк)
- 2013 — Dance (Танцуй)
- 2013 — Lyapis Crew
- 2012 — Iron (Железный)
- 2012 — Armored vehicle (Броненосец)
- 2012 — WaysofPeople (Путинарода, also could be translated as In kind of Putin)
- 2011 — Not To Be Cattle! (Не быць скотам!)
- 2011 — Princess (Принцесса)
- 2011 — Astronauts (Космонавты)
- 2011 — I believe (second version, Я верю)
- 2011 — I believe (Я верю)
- 2010 — Africa (Африка)
- 2010 — Bolt (Болт)
- 2010 — Buy Belarusian (Купляй беларускае)
- 2010 — Pulse of epoch (Пульс эпохи)
- 2009 — Fireflies (Светлячки)
- 2009 — Petrel (Буревестник)
- 2009 — Belarus Freedom
- 2009 — The Lights (Огоньки)
- 2008 — Manifesto (Манифест)
- 2008 — Zhlob (Жлоб)
- 2008 — Kerch-2 (Керчь-2)
- 2008 — Golden Antelope (Золотая Антилопа)
- 2007 — Capital (animated version, Капитал)
- 2007 — Capital (garage version, Капитал)
- 2006 — Reindeers (by TIK, Олені)
- 2006 — No More (Харе)
- 2006 — Sayani (Саяны)
- 2006 — Andryusha (Андрюша)
- 2004 — Ten O'Clock Postman (Почтальоны)
- 2004 — Golden Eggs (Золотые яйцы)
- 2003 — Rainka (Раинька)
- 2003 — Swallows (Ласточки)
- 2002 — Gop-Hip-Hop, КДБ микс (feat. Sasha and Sirozha, Гоп-хип-хоп)
- 2002 — Youth (Юность)
- 2001 — Nonbeauty (Некрасавица)
- 2001 — Sochi (Сочи)
- 2001 — Love turned its back on me (feat. KARAPUZIKEE, Любовь повернулась ко мне задом)
- 2001 — Doves (Голуби)
- 2000 — In The Alleys (feat. MASKY-SHOW, По аллеям)
- 2000 — UFO (НЛО)
- 2000 — Sports have passed (Спорт прошел)
- 2000 — Pal (Version 2 – master, Дружбан)
- 2000 — Pal (Version 1 – backwards, Дружбан)
- 1999 — Appletrees (Яблони)
- 1999 — Rose (Розочка)
- 1999 — You gave me up (feat. Diskoteka Avariya, Кинула)
- 1998 — You Gave me Up (Кинула)
- 1998 — In a white dress (В платье белом)
- 1997 — Ah-oo (Ау)
