= InterMedia =

Russian international media news agency

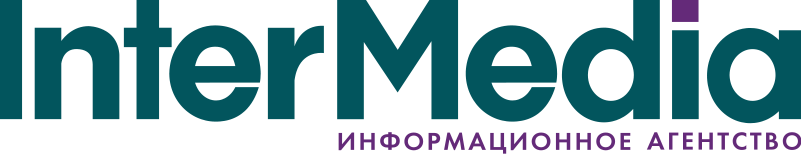
- Company type: Federal State Unitary Enterprise
- Industry: News media
- Founded: 1993
- Headquarters: Moscow, Russia
- Products: Wire service
- Subsidiaries: National Federation of Phonograph Producers (NFPF)
- Website: https://intermedia.ru (Russian version)

InterMedia (Russian: ИнтерМедиа), is Russia's international media news agency, which is specializing in news of music, cinema, theater, and the life of stars. The agency publishes a daily and round-the-clock news feed, publishes music charts of Russian Federation, and also publishes the Russian Music Yearbook. The music market research department of thefirm conducts continuous monitoring and marketing research of the music industry.

Since April, 2010, the album and song sales positions have been and contributed to Intermedia by approximately 5,000 music sellers. Russian independent newspaper Republic proclaimed Intermedia as an independent source of charts in Russia.

For 10 years, the agency has collaborated with National Federation of Phonograph Producers (NFPF) on the certification of musical works in the territory of the Russian Federation. In February 2018, NFPF was liquidated and certification authority was transferred to the InterMedia divisions.

== History ==
The InterMedia news agency was founded in 1993, when Yevgeny Safronov, Alexander Shumsky and Dmitry Anoshin left the Turne agency to start a new project, the main task of which was to provide the Russian media with the most objective and impartial news and analysis of media industry.

== Publishing ==
In 1995, InterMedia published the book Musical Results of the Year, which in 1996 was named the Russian Music Yearbook. The Russian Music Yearbook contains information for professionals in the cultural and entertainment industry: an address and telephone directory, analytical information, official documents. In 2011, the 13th edition of the yearbook was re-released.

== Charts ==
Every week Intermedia publishes album and singles charts of Russian Federation — consolidated charts, based on song sales and streaming data.

Charts are published on the portals like Rambler, Yandex and Sputnik.

== Analytical activity ==
For the first time in Russia, the news agency InterMedia began to seriously study the music market. Many studies of the music market were published exclusively in the Kommersant and Argumenty i Fakty publications. Among the analytical works is a study of philharmonic activities in the field of academic music in the country by order of the Ministry of Culture of the Russian Federation (2010), as well as market research of concert and entertainment events in Moscow and St. Petersburg.

== Music recording certification ==
InterMedia collaborated with the National Federation of Phonograph Producers (NFPF) on the certification of sales of sound recordings in the Russian Federation. In November 2018, the agency published an independent study “Culture and Cultural Industries in the Russian Federation”.
